= R. Rex Parris =

American attorney and politician

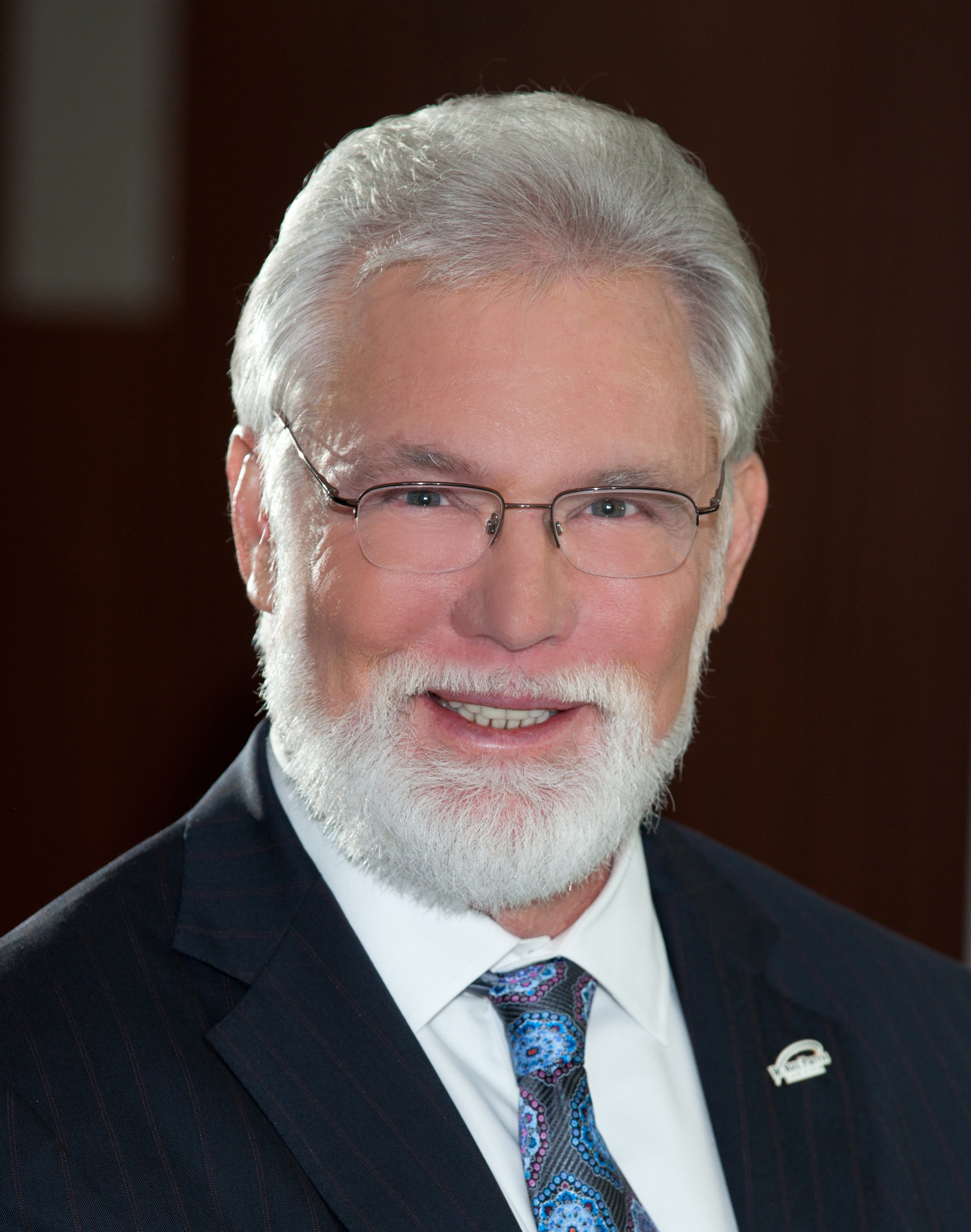
- Official portrait, 2011

Mayor of Lancaster, California
- Incumbent
- Assumed office April 2008

Personal details
- Born: Raymond Parris Jr. 1952 (age 73–74) Palmdale, California, U.S.
- Party: Republican
- Spouse: Carrol Parris
- Children: 4
- Education: Southwestern School of Law (JD)
- Occupation: Attorney
- Website: Official website

Raymond "Rex" Parris Jr. is an American attorney and politician. A member of the Republican Party, he has served as the mayor of Lancaster, California since 2008.

== Early life and education ==
Raymond "Rex" Parris Jr., the third of four boys, was born in 1952 to Raymond Parris and Jeanne Powers in Palmdale, California. His parents separated in 1963 after Raymond lost his leg in a motorcycle accident. Finding his mother's income as a waitress to be insufficient, Rex left high school in the tenth grade to work full-time as a busboy.

Parris attended Antelope Valley College before transferring to the University of California, Santa Barbara, where he was accepted into the Scholar's Program and majored in Law & Society. He went on to receive his Juris Doctor from Southwestern Law School in 1980. He has been a member of the State Bar of California since 1980.

== Career ==
=== Law ===
In 1985, R. Rex Parris founded the Lancaster-based PARRIS Law Firm with his wife Carrol. In 2009, Parris was lead counsel in obtaining a $370 million jury verdict against the founder of the clothing brand Guess. He obtained a $120 million traffic accident verdict in 2021. That same year, the PARRIS Law Firm settled on behalf of the residents of Porter Ranch, California for up to $1.8 billion from the Southern California Gas Company and Sempra Energy, for their role in the Aliso Canyon gas leak.

=== Philanthropy ===
R. Rex Parris High School in Palmdale, California is named for Parris. In 2014, Parris and his wife Carrol established the Parris Institute for Professional Excellence at Pepperdine University with a gift of $2.2 million.

Parris and his wife are also significant donors for longevity research at the University of Southern California.

=== Other business interests ===
R Rex Parris is the chairman of the board for CarthroniX, a biotech firm working to develop several drugs that treat arthritis, pulmonary fibrosis, multiple sclerosis, and other conditions.

== Mayor of Lancaster, California ==
=== Elections ===
R. Rex Parris was first elected mayor of Lancaster, California in April 2008. He was subsequently re-elected in April 2010, 2012, 2016, 2020, and 2024. In the most recent election, Parris won with a 35% plurality of the vote against an 11-candidate field; Lancaster does not have runoff elections.

=== Tenure ===
As mayor, Parris in 2010 launched an economic development division that attracted manufacturing company BYD.

Parris was involved with many city initiatives, including the Lancaster Wellness Homes and YOLO Lancaster.

Supported by a unanimous 2021 vote by the City Council, Parris led efforts to start a public health agency specifically for Lancaster. These efforts came after a vote of no confidence was issued against the LA County Department of Public Health during the COVID-19 pandemic.

==== Green energy ====
Since his election, Parris has taken steps to make Lancaster a "Net Zero City." In 2015, Lancaster became the first city in the world to generate more clean energy than it consumes and require all new housing to be net zero.

In July 2010, the City of Lancaster partnered with SolarCity to launch the Solar Lancaster program, a solar financing program for homeowners, business owners and nonprofit organizations. In 2015, Parris and the City of Lancaster launched Lancaster Choice Energy, a nonprofit locally-run energy company for Lancaster businesses and residents.

Lancaster's Antelope Valley Transit Authority is the first public bus agency with 100% of their fleet electric buses.

Parris is a frequent keynote speaker on climate change at conferences throughout the world, such as Verdical Group's annual Net Zero Conference in 2017. The United States Environmental Protection Agency awarded the city of Lancaster in 2019 with its Greenpower Leadership Award.

==== Controversies ====
Throughout his tenure, Parris has been known for a history of controversial remarks.

In 2011, when Lancaster was allegedly shouldering a disproportionate share of Section 8 housing, Parris accused the Los Angeles County Housing Authority of using the city as a dumping ground for the poor and homeless. He stoked controversy again in 2017 when he told Vice magazine in 2017 that increasing the Asian American and LGBT population of Lancaster could help bring down crime rates and increase education levels. In February 2025, Parris advocated for giving the homeless as much fentanyl as they desire, which has been sharply criticized by local media and community members.

President Donald Trump visited the city of Lancaster on February 18, 2020, accompanied by House Minority Leader Kevin McCarthy. Parris met with Trump, and described him as "incredibly charming" and having a "magnetic personality". After the 2021 storming of the United States Capitol, Parris reflected on the experience, describing himself as being "horrified" and his view of the Capitol as "almost sacrosanct."

== Personal life ==
Parris is married to his wife Carrol, with whom he has four children. They have six grandchildren. Two of their sons, Khail and Rutger, continue to work at PARRIS Law Firm. Parris’ brother, Robert Parris, a former CHP officer, has been an attorney with the firm since 1992.

Parris purchased a home previously owned by Lee Iacocca in Laguna Beach, California in April 2020 for $6.6 million.
