= La Goleta Gas Field =

Natural gas field in Santa Barbara County, California, United States

Coordinates: 34.4218°N 119.8186°W

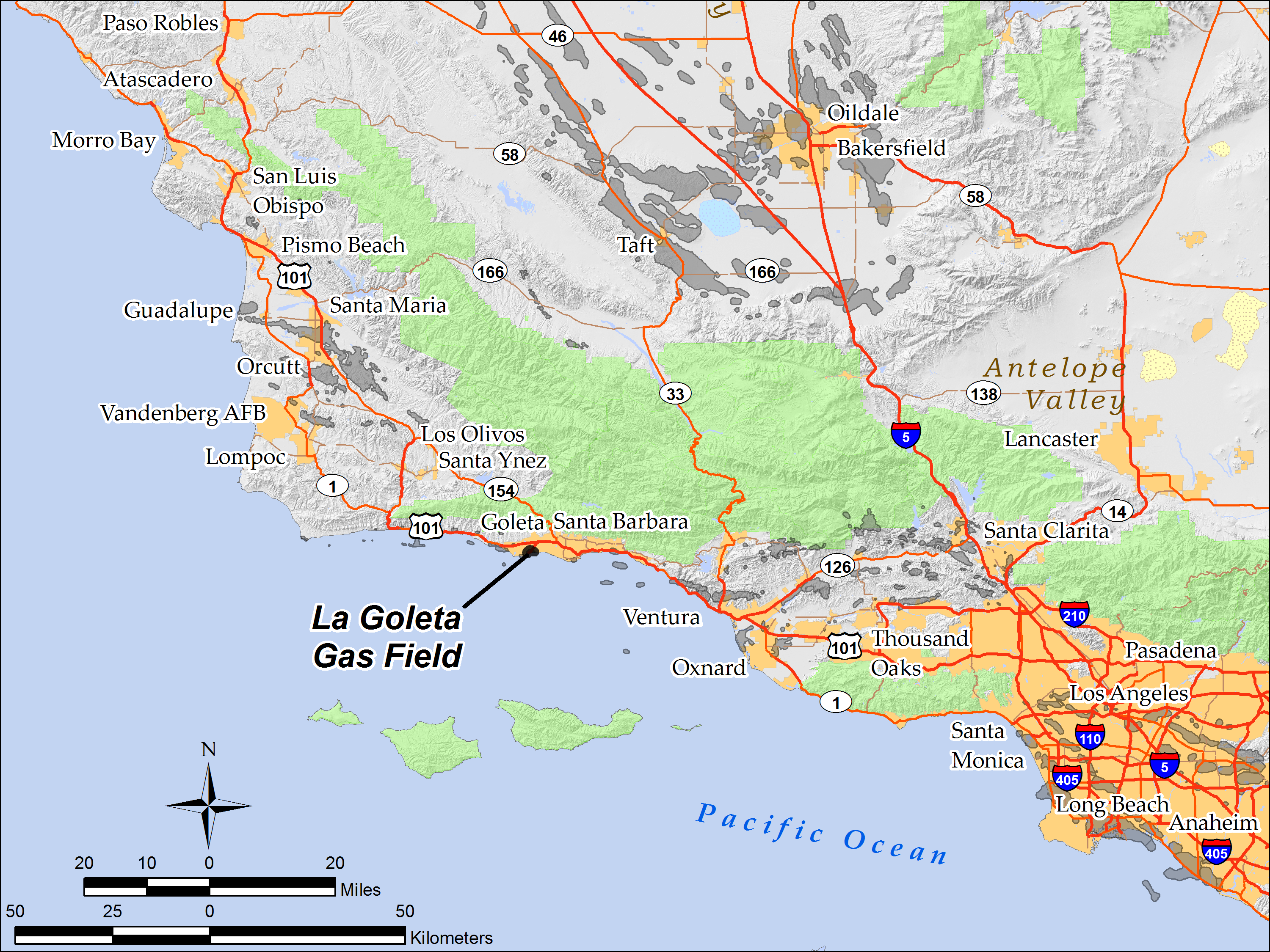
The La Goleta Gas Field in Santa Barbara County, California. Other oil and gas fields are shown in gray.

The La Goleta Gas Field (also known as the Goleta Gas Field and La Goleta Storage Field) is a natural gas field in unincorporated Santa Barbara County, California, adjacent to the city of Goleta. Discovered in 1929, and first put into production in 1932, it has been in continuous use ever since, producing approximately 12 billion cubic feet of gas. With production declining, the field was converted into a gas storage reservoir in 1941. As of 2016 it remains one of the four gas storage facilities maintained by Southern California Gas Company (SoCalGas), a division of Sempra Energy, with the others being Aliso Canyon, Honor Rancho and Playa del Rey. It is the oldest storage facility of the four and the third largest, with a maximum capacity of 21.5 billion cubic feet. The storage facilities are necessary to balance load for the over ten million customers of SoCalGas: during summer months, when gas usage is at a minimum, gas is pumped into the reservoirs; and in the winter when usage is high, gas is withdrawn. The La Goleta field serves the northern portion of SoCalGas's geographic range.

In 2013 the field had 19 active gas wells and two observation wells. SoCalGas installed four new production wells in 2014-2015 after filing an Environmental Impact Report and obtaining a Land Use Permit from Santa Barbara County. The new wells pull gas from geologic units deeper than the existing storage reservoir, which is about 4,000 feet below ground surface.

== Geographic setting ==
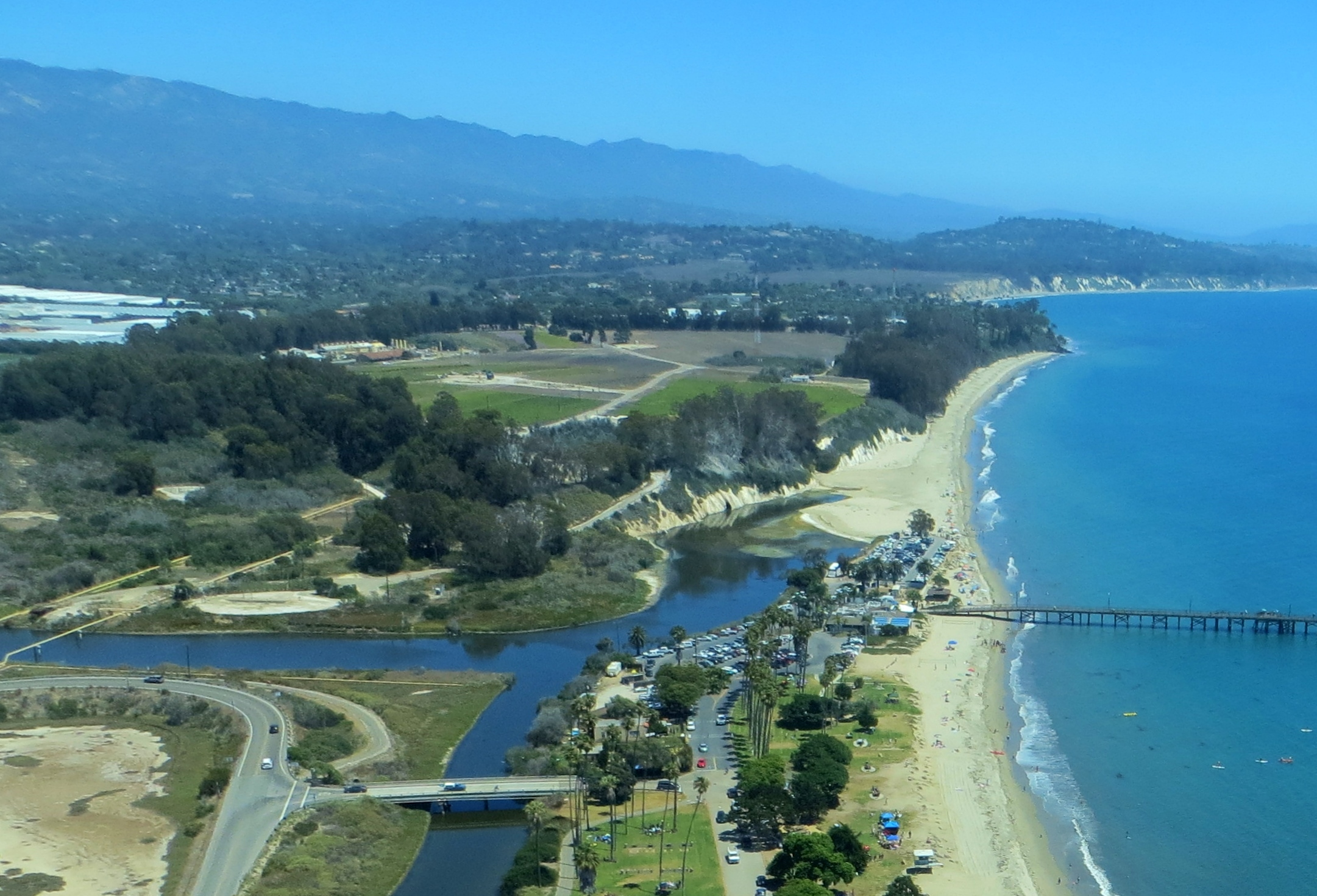
La Goleta Gas Field, from the west. Goleta Beach County Park is to the right; the processing area is in the left center, next to the trees.

The field is on the coast near the city of Goleta. The westernmost part of the field is within the property of the University of California, Santa Barbara; a cluster of gas wells operates just north of the east entrance roundabout. The field extends east from there under the narrow neck of the Goleta Slough where it drains to the Pacific Ocean; under Mescalitan Island, where a cluster of wells shares the remnant island with the Goleta Sewage Treatment Plant; under Goleta Beach County Park; and finally to a blufftop at the western end of the range of low hills that extends along the shore eastward through More Mesa to Hope Ranch. The main gas processing facility for the field, and all recent development, are on this blufftop, on a single 147.4-acre parcel owned by SoCalGas, hidden from view by the elevated terrain and a dense grove of trees on the north. From the beach, operations are hidden by the steep coastal bluff.

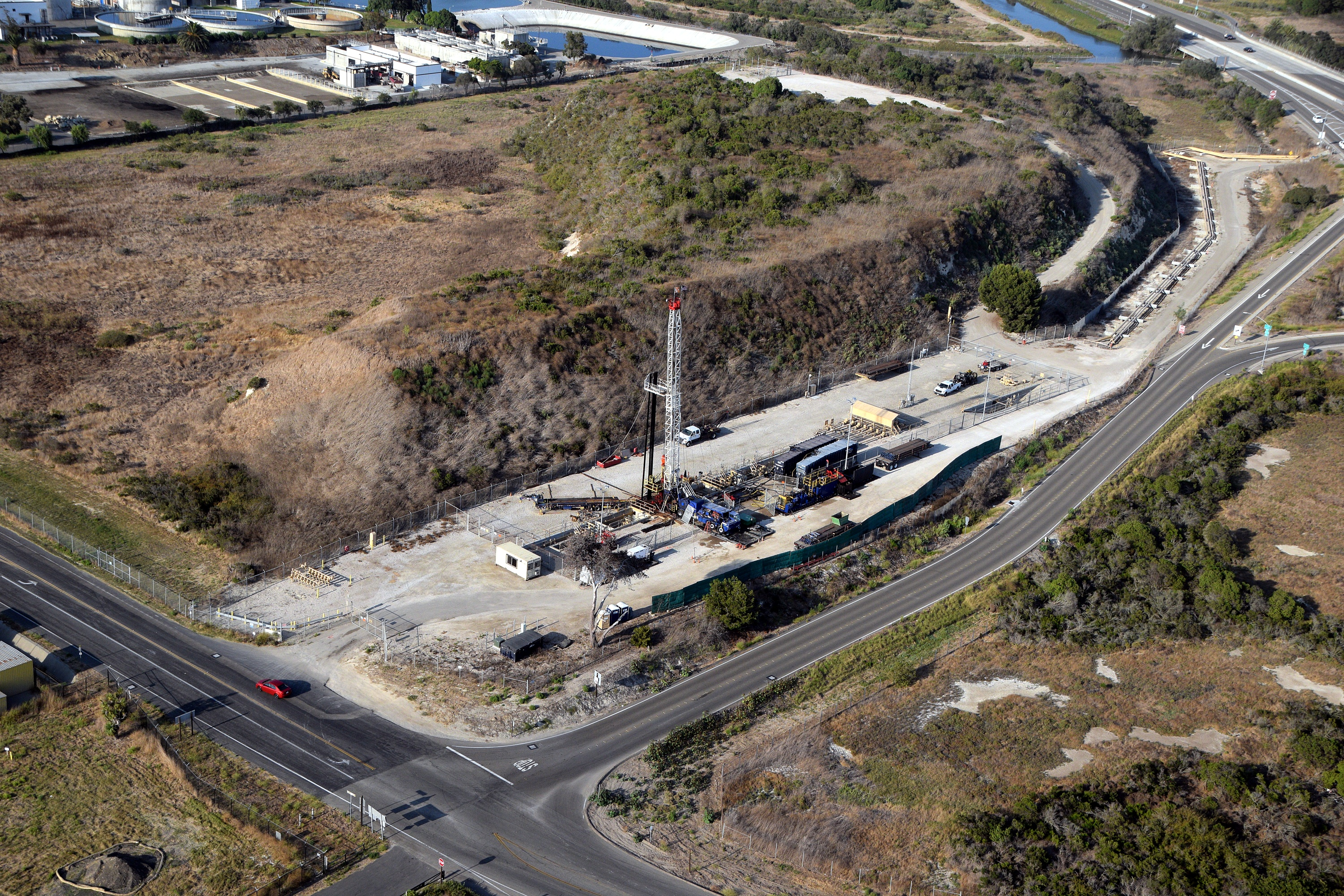
August 2017 Gas drilling at Mescalitan Isl.

Land uses in the vicinity of the gas field are primarily agricultural and recreational, with a major transportation corridor cutting through (California Highway 217 from UCSB to US Highway 101). In addition, the Goleta Slough and Atascadero Creek include protected wetlands, and important wildlife habitats occur throughout the area occupied by the gas field. A mobile home park is adjacent to the field on the north, at the southern end of Ward Drive.

Climate in the area is Mediterranean, with warm summers and mild, rainy winters. Rain does not ordinarily occur between April and October in any significant amount. Site drainage is to the Pacific Ocean, either directly down the bluff, or into Atascadero Creek and Goleta Slough. Stormwater from the processing plant and adjacent areas on the blufftop runs through a treatment system before being channeled north into Atascadero Creek.

== Geology ==
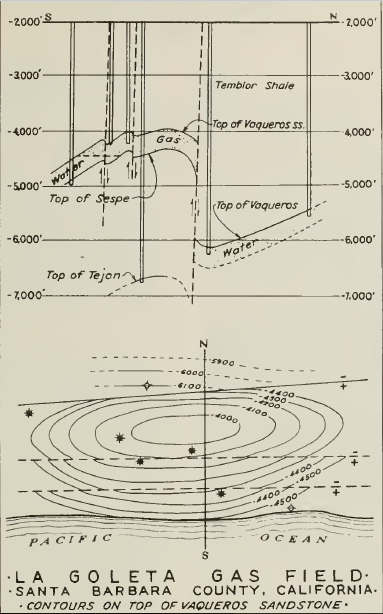
La Goleta Gas Field Structure Map and Geologic Cross Section

The gas field is within an anticlinal structure cut and bounded on the north by the More Ranch Fault. The geologic unit on the surface is the Monterey Formation. Beneath the Monterey is the Rincon Formation, a shale unit which forms an impermeable cap on the gas reservoir below. The main productive zone, directly under the Rincon, is in the Vaqueros Formation, a sandstone unit found about 4,000 feet below ground surface, familiar from its outcrops on the lower slopes of the Santa Ynez Mountains, right at the line where chaparral replaces grassland. Below the Vaqueros is either the red sandstone and conglomerate Sespe Formation, which was found to contain pockets of gas, none of commercially producible quantity in the early history of the field, or the "Eocene-age" unit, as it is known in the 2013 Environmental Impact Report. This is the unit being targeted by drilling in the 2014 field enhancement project.

== History and operations ==
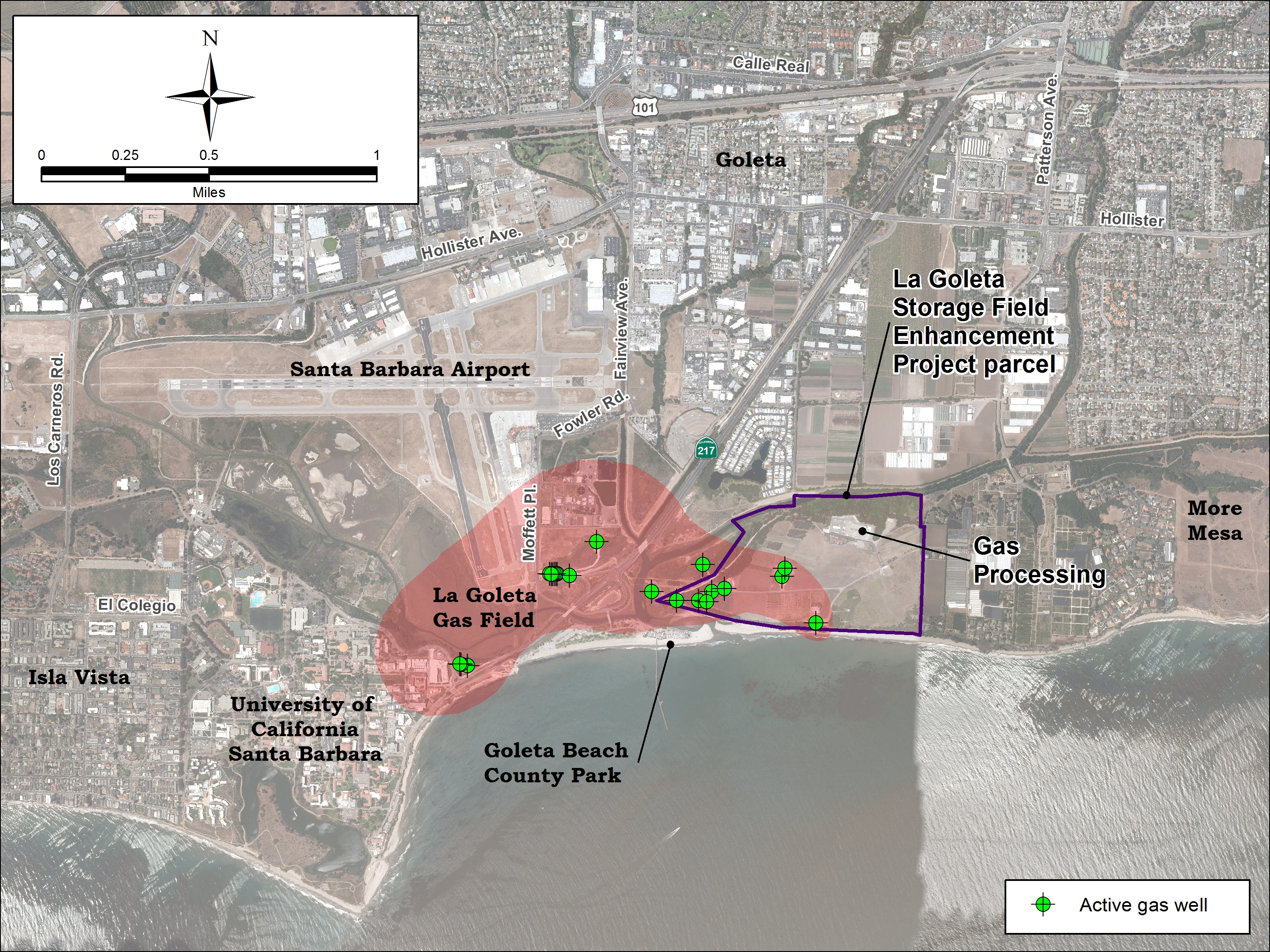
Detail of La Goleta Gas Field and surrounding area, showing location of active wells.

The 1920s was a period of intense oil exploration in California, with increasing interest in natural gas as its use came to replace manufactured gas. During this time, the large Ellwood Oil Field several miles west of the site was discovered and developed, as well as the small Mesa Oil Field near downtown Santa Barbara. Drillers prospecting for oil or gas drilled an exploratory well into the La Goleta field in 1929, but the well hit a high-pressure gas reservoir around 4,500 feet deep and blew out spectacularly, spewing gas at a rate of 60 million cubic feet of gas per day. The operator, General Petroleum Corp. of California, redrilled the well in 1932, bringing it into production. Peak production was in 1934, and the reservoir declined rapidly after that, being exhausted by the late 1930s. Total production through 1937 was 14 billion cubic feet of gas.

While the petroleum industry had largely lost interest in the field in the late 1930s, the need for natural gas increased during the Second World War. Pacific Lighting Gas, the predecessor of the SoCalGas, needed a way to balance load between winter and summer use of gas, so began repressurizing the La Goleta Gas Field with natural gas, converting it into storage, and building a compressor station.

In the early 2000s, recognizing the need to expand the capacity of their system and better level the load between summer and winter gas usage, SoCalGas proposed a project to upgrade the field. Four new gas wells would be drilled into a deeper, previously untapped gas reservoir believed to exist in an Eocene-age sandstone formation under the Vaqueros Formation. After this gas was exhausted, this reservoir could be used to expand the field's storage capacity. The County produced a Draft Environmental Impact Report, then solicited comments from the public and regulatory agencies, and then compiled those with responses into a Final Environmental Impact Report. In June 2013, the Santa Barbara County Board of Supervisors voted to allow the project to proceed, and drilling of the new wells, and construction of the upgraded facilities began in 2014.

In the current gas field, wells are connected to processing, storage, and transmission facilities by about eight miles (13 km) of pipelines, both above and below ground. The design allows withdrawal of up to 400 million cubic feet of gas per day.
