= Honor Rancho Oil Field =

Oil and natural gas field adjacent to Santa Clarita, California, United States

Coordinates: 34.4469°N 118.5873°W

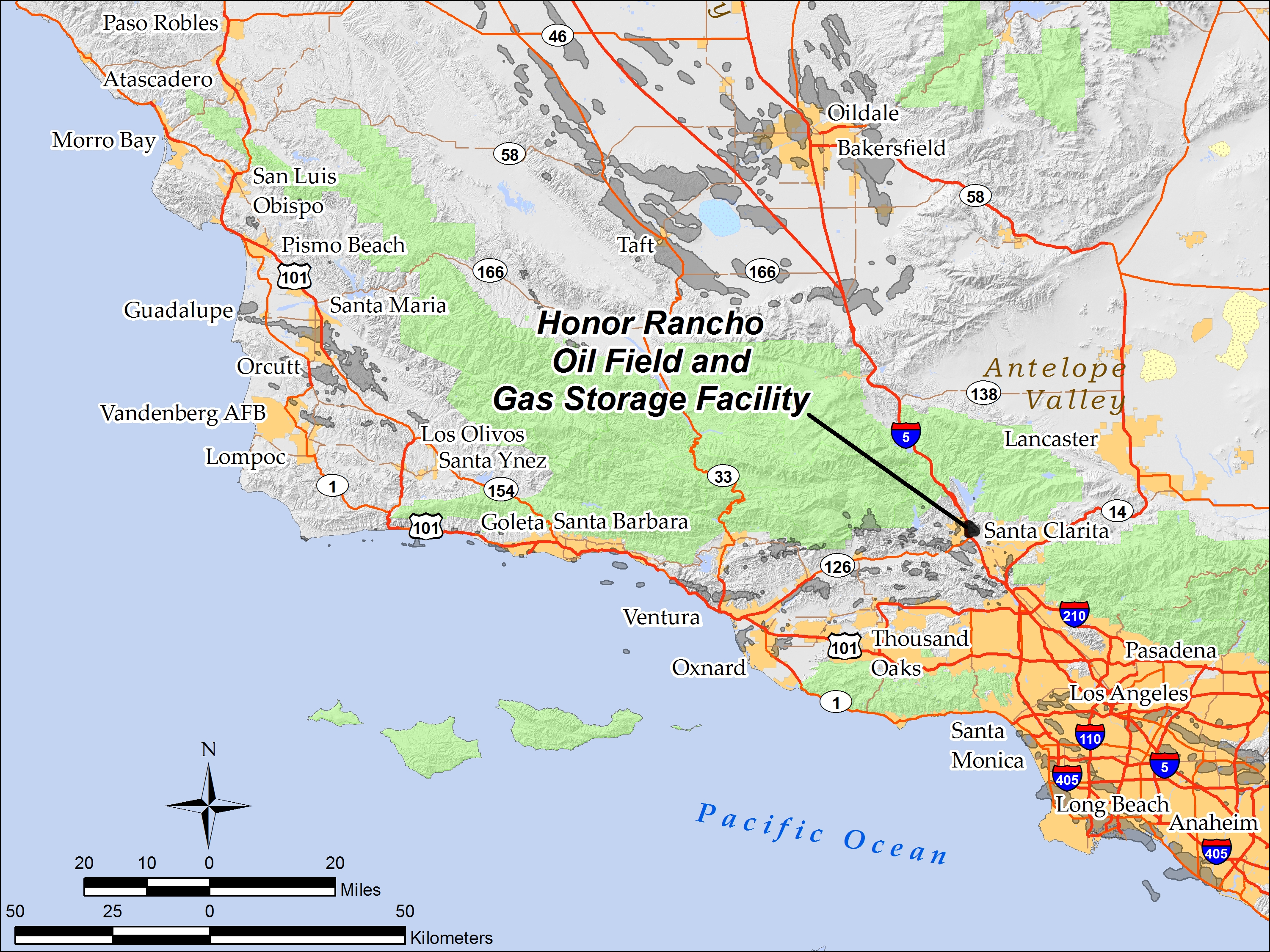
- Location of Honor Rancho Oil Field and Gas Storage Facility in southern California
- Country: United States
- Location: Los Angeles County, California
- Offshore/onshore: onshore
- Operators: Southern California Gas Company, Vintage Production, LLC.

Field history
- Discovery: 1950
- Start of development: 1950
- Start of production: 1950
- Peak year: 1957

Production
- Current production of oil: 138 barrels per day (~6,880 t/a)
- Year of current production of oil: 2014
- Estimated oil in place: 1.352 million barrels (~1.844×10^{5} t)
- Producing formations: Modelo Formation

The Honor Rancho Oil Field (also Honor Rancho Natural Gas Storage Field, Honor Rancho Underground Storage Facility) is an approximately 600-acre oil field and natural gas storage facility in Los Angeles County, California, on the northern border of the Valencia neighborhood of Santa Clarita, near the junction of Interstate 5 and westbound California State Route 126. Discovered in 1950 and quickly developed, the field's oil production peaked in the 1950s, but remains productive in 2016. In 1975 Southern California Gas Company (SoCalGas), the gas utility serving Southern California, began using one of its depleted oil producing zones, the Wayside 13 zone, as a gas storage reservoir, and it became the second-largest in their inventory after the Aliso Canyon gas storage facility. The field shares part of its extent with the Peter J. Pitchess Detention Center, which includes a maximum-security prison.

The only operators on the field as of 2016 were SoCalGas and Vintage Production California, LLC, a subsidiary of Occidental Petroleum. The field produced approximately 50,000 barrels of oil in 2014, and the capacity of the gas storage reservoir is about 26 billion cubic feet of natural gas. Forty gas injection wells tap into the reservoir.

== Geographic setting ==
Honor Rancho is in the foothills north of the junction if Interstate 5 and westbound California State Route 126, north-northeast of the confluence of Castaic Creek and the Santa Clara River, in the Santa Clarita Valley. The town of Castaic is to the northwest, and the city of Santa Clarita is immediately to the south. Elevation on the oil field ranges from around 1050 to 1450 feet above sea level. Runoff is either to Castaic Creek on the west, or towards the Santa Clara River to the south.

Access to the natural gas storage facility from the southeast is from Rye Canyon Road, and access to Vintage Petroleum's operations on the north and west is from Hasley Canyon Road, which also provides access to the prison.

== Geology ==
The oil field is located in the northeastern extreme of the Ventura Basin Province, a petroleum-rich sedimentary basin with a long history of oil and gas production. Overall, the structure of the oil field is a plunging anticline oriented northwest to southeast, dipping to the southeast; most of the hydrocarbon accumulation is along the southwest flank of this structure,(1959) which resembles a southwest-dipping homocline. One stratigraphic unit, the Miocene-age Modelo Formation, contains oil and gas accumulations. To the northeast, the San Gabriel Fault closes the structure, trapping hydrocarbons with an approximate 500-foot offset, placing impermeable rock units adjacent to the petroleum-bearing Modelo formation. The other sides of the field are sealed stratrigraphically, specifically by permeability changes in the rock preventing hydrocarbon movement.

The Main Area of the oil field – the first discovered – contains six separate pools of oil, grouped into the "Gabriel," "Wayside", and "Rancho" zones, from top to bottom; they have average depths below ground surface of 3,800, 5,300, and 6,500 feet, respectively. The Southeast Area of the field, the portion used since 1975 as a gas storage reservoir, contains one large pool – the Wayside 13 – at a depth of 9,000 to 11,000 feet below ground surface.

== History and production ==
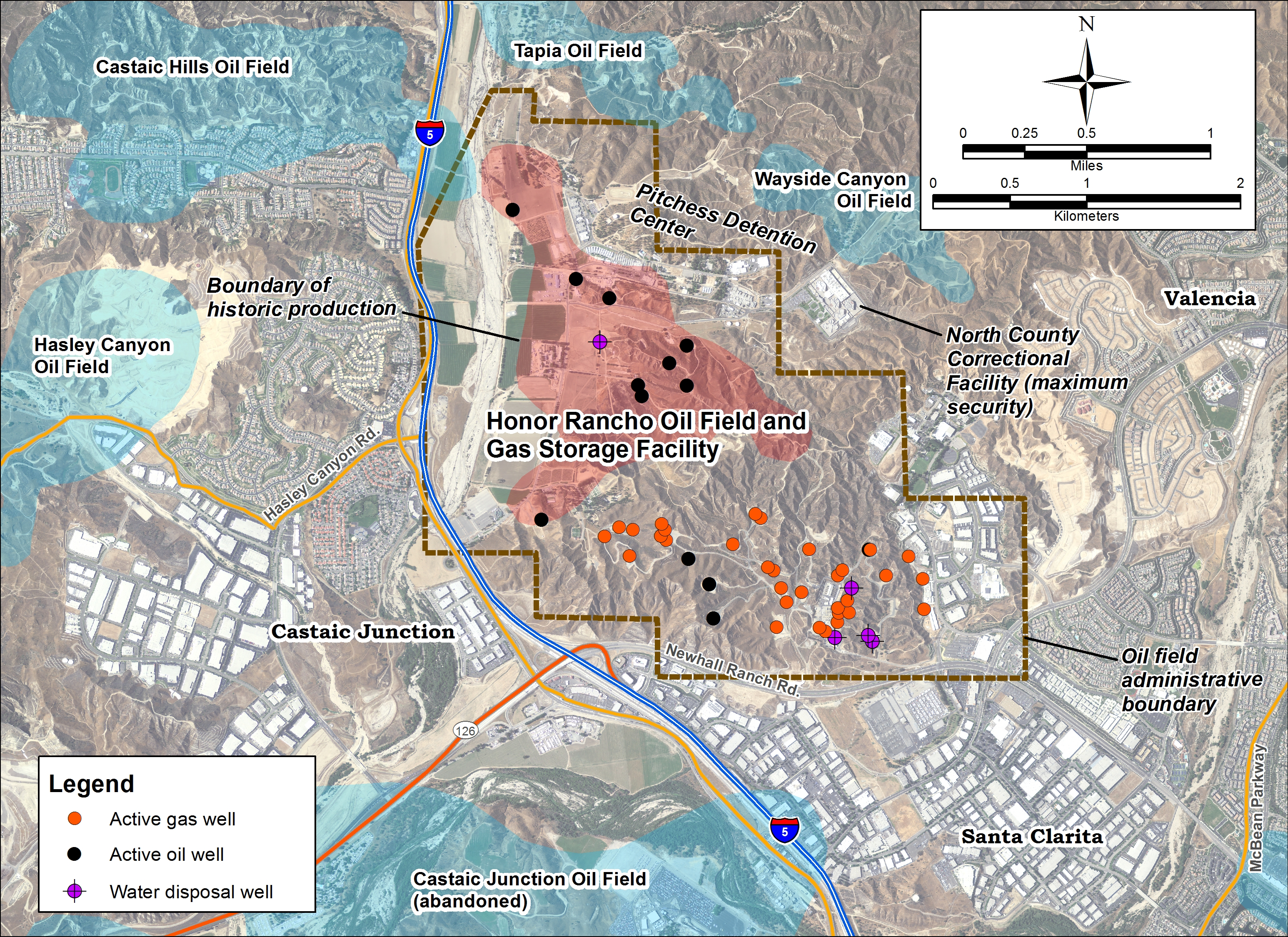
Detail of the Honor Rancho field. Active oil wells are black dots; active gas injection wells are orange dots.

The field takes its name from the Wayside Honor Rancho, a former minimum-security prison founded in 1938, where inmates were rehabilitated in an outdoor, ranch and farming environment. Honor Rancho was a small oil field found after most of the large oil fields in the vicinity had already been developed. Southeast of Honor Rancho, across Interstate 5, is the Newhall Oil Field, site of the first commercially successful oil well in the western United States, Pico No. 4. But fields such as Honor Rancho were harder to find because the oil traps had no surface expression, like the prominent anticline of the Santa Susana Mountains in which the county's earliest oil wells were drilled. Texaco spudded the Honor Rancho discovery well in August 1950, finding oil at 6,000 feet below ground surface. Production grew for the next several years, with oil output peaking in 1957, and gas in 1965.

Several enhanced recovery methods were used during the field's history. In 1954, operators began gas injection into the Wayside pool, discontinuing it in 1961. After the 1957 peak, operators began a waterflood operation in the Wayside pool, and in 1959 in the Rancho pool. In this method, water is pumped back into the reservoir to replace fluid previously removed, increasing reservoir pressure and driving remaining oil to recovery wells. In the Southeast Area of the field, gas injection was used from 1960 to 1966, and waterflood from 1972 to 1975, the year the Wayside 13 reservoir was converted to gas storage.

In 1975, SoCalGas acquired the Wayside 13 reservoir for use as a gas storage facility. It was the fourth such facility for the utility, after La Goleta near Santa Barbara, Playa del Rey in Los Angeles, and Aliso Canyon north of the San Fernando Valley, and the third which had been an oil field. The Honor Rancho field was the first storage facility acquired by SoCalGas where they also owned the rights to the oil produced. Techniques used to produce gas and maintain the reservoir contributed to oil recovery, which SoCalGas was able to do itself. Sale of the oil produced helped offset other costs.

A 2010 upgrade of the field approximately doubled the gas injection and withdrawal capacity. SoCalGas prepared the application to the State Public Utilities Commission in 2009, and received the go-ahead in April 2010. Among the project aims was the removal of highly saline water from the bottom of the storage reservoir, which would allow an increase in total storage capacity by five billion cubic feet.

In the current gas field, wells are connected to processing, storage, and transmission facilities by about 12 miles (19 km) of pipelines, both above and below ground. The design allows withdrawal of up to one billion cubic feet of gas per day.

In January 2016, Santa Clarita City Manager Ken Striplin met with representatives of SoCalGas to determine whether the field had any of the same problems that led to the methane gas leak at the similar, but four times larger gas storage facility ten miles south. He determined the risk level was low. Similarly, Steve Knight, the congressional representative for California's 25th District, toured the facility, and told his constituents that the field "is checked constantly."
