= San Gabriel Fault =

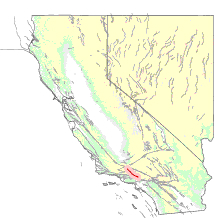
Map of the San Gabriel Fault zone

The San Gabriel Fault is a geological fault in Los Angeles County, California, running about 87 miles (140 km) southeastward from the Ridge Basin in the Sierra Pelona-San Emigdio Mountains juncture area to the western San Gabriel Mountains that forms their southwestern face near Sunland and the northeastern San Fernando Valley, and then on the south flank to the southeastern part of the San Gabriel range.

== Location and age ==
The San Gabriel Fault is a right-lateral strike-slip that was last active between 10 and 5 million years ago – Late Quaternary west of intersection with the Sierra Madre Fault, and Quaternary east of that intersection, and Holocene only further west between Saugus and Castaic-Gorman.

The San Gabriel Fault started 13-11 million years ago as a large part of the San Andreas Fault, and is believed to be the former path of it. It is part of the San Gabriel Fault Zone, which starts in the northwestern corner of the Ridge Basin, splits into two faults in its southeastern section, in the northwestern San Gabriel Mountains, and ends in the eastern part of those Mountains. The San Gabriel Fault is the north branch. It is older and goes eastward from the south branch which is younger, the Vazquez Creek Fault.

It is also believed that the northwestern end of this fault zone meets the current San Andreas Fault zone beneath the Frazier Mountain Thrust, near the juncture of the San Andreas with the Garlock Fault and Big Pine Fault.

== Orientation and movement ==
Different areas of the fault have different types of separation: normal or reverse. It is normal in the northwest portion of the fault (Castaic Hills Oil Field), and reverse/thrust in the southeast (southeast of Honor Rancho Oil Field). The San Gabriel Fault moves at a rate of between 1 and 5 millimeters a year, with an average slip of around 3 millimeters. Overall, it has 22–23 km of right separation east of the Vazquez Creek Fault, and a total amount of 42 km.

Some strata dip away from the fault (in the northwestern portion) and other strata dip toward the fault (in the east, but only in the southeast portion), with the Saugus Oil Field having the greatest amount of split in the dip. The overall dip is 65°–85° NE. If these two segments were rotated horizontal, the dip becomes almost 90 degrees, and so it is thought that the dip started out to be almost vertical and rotated to its present northeast dip from folding and horizontal shortening.

The fault is therefore made up of two sections. In the northwest the strike is northwest and normal separation. In the southeast there is a west-northwest strike and reverse separation. In the northern part there are mountains, the southern part has little land formations. The northern part is considered inactive, while the southeast part near Honor Rancho Oil Field is thought to be active due to evidence of Holocene sediment displacement.
