= San Diego Gas & Electric =

Public utility that provides natural gas and electricity

- Type: Subsidiary
- Industry: Utilities
- Founded: 1881; 145 years ago
- Headquarters: San Diego, California, United States
- Products: Natural Gas & Electric
- Parent: Sempra
- Website: sdge.com

San Diego Gas & Electric (SDG&E) is a regulated public utility that provides natural gas and electricity to San Diego County and southern Orange County in California. It is owned by Sempra, a Fortune 500 energy services holding company based in San Diego.

SDG&E provides energy service to 3.7 million consumers through 1.49 million electric meters and more than 905,000 natural gas meters. The utility's area spans 4,100 square miles (10,600 square kilometers). SDG&E has about 4,000 employees.

== Generation portfolio ==
In 2004, the California Public Utilities Commission approved SDG&E's long-term energy resource plan, which relies on a balanced mix of resources to meet the growing energy needs of San Diego. That mix includes increased emphasis on energy efficiency, more renewable energy resources, and additional baseload generation plants and transmission capacity. In 2014 SDG&E had a renewables mix of 36.4%, more than the 33% requirement by 2020. By 2016, 43.2% of SDG&E's electrical power sources were renewable.

SDG&E's system includes 134 distribution substations, 10,558 miles of underground power lines, and 6,527 miles of overhead power lines.

=== Generation and Storage Facilities ===
- Palomar Energy Center (PEC)
- Desert Star Energy Center (DSEC)
- Miramar Energy Facility (MEF)
- Cuyamaca Peak Energy Plant (CPEP)
- Escondido Battery Energy Storage System (Escondido BESS)
- El Cajon Battery Energy Storage System (El Cajon BESS)
- Ramona Solar Energy Project (RSEP)

== Interconnections ==
SDG&E has two 230 kilovolt (kV) lines (the Miguel–Tijuana Line and the La Rosita–Imperial Valley Line) that connect the California transmission system with the Mexican Comisión Federal de Electricidad transmission system in Baja California. The Path 45 transmission corridor, spanning over the Mexico–United States border, has a capacity of 408 megawatts (MW). SDG&E has a 500 kV line connecting to Arizona Public Service, and a 230 kV line connecting to the Imperial Irrigation District (IID). Both of these are part of the massive Path 46 transmission system ensuring Southern California has adequate energy supply.

The Sunrise Powerlink includes approximately 117 miles (188 km) of 500 kV and 230 kV overhead and underground transmission lines with several large 230/500 kV substations. The transmission line linking San Diego to Imperial Valley, one of the most renewable-rich regions in California, was put into service on June 18, 2012. Solar energy from Southern California's Imperial Valley is delivered to San Diego through the Sunrise Powerlink.

== History ==
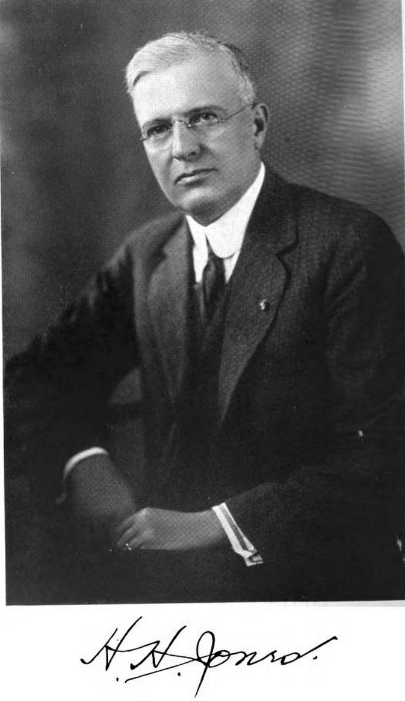
Henry Harrison Jones - President San Diego Consolidated Gas & Electric 1910–1920. Director Panama-California Exposition (1915)

=== Founding ===
In 1881, power first came to the city of San Diego in the form of gas-lit street lamps. The San Diego Gas Company, a newly formed partnership of eight local businessmen, supplied the gas for the lamps, which were located on Fifth Street in downtown.

The city's first incandescent lighting was provided by a small plant at India and Kalmia Streets. It was installed in 1888 to power the city's first electric streetcar, built that year by the Electric Rapid Transit Street Car Company.

Henry H. Jones, a civil, construction, and electrical engineer, came to San Diego in 1910 as vice president and manager of the San Diego Consolidated Gas & Electric Company and became president shortly thereafter.

Henry Harrison Jones was born in Reading, Pennsylvania, March 31, 1874, son of Richard Hall and Ellen (Hughes) Jones. After graduating from high school in 1890 he was a bookkeeper at the Second National Bank, then entered Lehigh University to pursue a technical course. He graduated as a Civil Engineer in 1897, then for a year was a draftsman and assistant engineer for the Chicago, Peoria, and St. Louis Railroad Company in Springfield, Illinois, then a member of the general engineering staff of the Pennsylvania Railroad at Philadelphia until 1899, when he again went west. Until 1903 he was in Chicago as an assistant engineer of the Chicago & Northwestern Railroad. For seventeen years his work was chiefly confined to traction and electric power engineering. He was general superintendent for the Springfield Railway & Light Company in Springfield, Illinois, until 1909, and before coming to San Diego was the manager of the Northern Idaho & Montana Power Company. In 1905, the San Diego Gas and Electric Light Company was struggling to meet the demand for its services. The company was sold that year to a Chicago firm H.M. Byllesby & Company and renamed the San Diego Consolidated Gas and Electric Company. Included in the deal were the company's main assets: an electric generating plant with four steam-driven turbines, a gas treatment plant, thirty miles of electric lines, thirty-four miles of gas mains, and the accounts of exactly 3426 customers. Henry H. Jones, a civil, construction, and electrical engineer, came to San Diego in 1910 as vice president and manager of the San Diego Consolidated Gas & Electric Company and became president shortly thereafter.

By 1920 the company furnished gas and electric service to San Diego city and forty adjacent towns and districts as far north as San Juan Capistrano in Orange County, and south to the Mexican border. When Jones took the management of the company in 1910 it had less than six thousand electric customers and less than nine thousand gas customers, while the number of customers in each branch in 1920 numbered nearly twenty-seven thousand. The quantity measure of service increased in proportion, necessitating the investment of millions of dollars in new equipment and distribution systems. In 1920 the company had five hundred and thirty miles of gas main and over seven hundred miles of electric poll lines.

Mr. Jones served as a director and member of the executive committee during the 1915 Panama–California Exposition, whose group was responsible for designing, creating, and building the first, original structures and buildings in Balboa Park.

=== Later history ===
In 1940, to comply with federal law, the company ended corporate ownership, made its stock available to the public, and renamed itself San Diego Gas & Electric Company.

SDG&E began construction on the South Bay power plant in 1958, and the first of four oil fuel-burning units came online in 1960. The plant provided much-needed electricity to help the region expand and grow its economy.

SDG&E began research into nuclear power in the late 1950s. In 1961, it agreed to participate in a 350,000-kilowatt nuclear power plant with Southern California Edison known as the San Onofre Nuclear Generating Station (SONGS). SDG&E owned 20% of the plant, located in San Onofre, California; SoCal Edison owned 80%. The plant became operational in 1967.

In the 1970s, SDG&E acquired Mountain Empire Rural Electric Co-op, which served eastern San Diego County.

In 1976, after purchasing the necessary land the previous year, San Diego Gas & Electric Company filed an application with the U.S. Nuclear Regulatory Commission to build two 974 MWe Westinghouse pressurized water reactors under the name Sundesert Nuclear Power Plant. The plant was to be located about 15 miles southwest of Blythe, California, near the Arizona border. The plant received a lot of pushback and opposition from California legislators, and the general public had mixed reactions to it. In June 1976, Californians voted to reject Proposition 15, the Nuclear Power Plant Initiative. The ballot measure would have banned the construction of nuclear power plants and limited the use of existing nuclear power plants to 60% (decreasing by 10% annually after five years) and would have reduced the output of California's three existing nuclear reactors and banned new reactors unless the state legislature determined that nuclear safety systems had proven effective and that radioactive waste could be stored safely. But coverage of the failed state measure and opposition to a separate nuclear power plant in Kern County, California, grew the anti-nuclear discourse. SDG&E, which would have built the Sundesert plant, failed to convince the State Assembly Resources Committee that adequate disposal technology was available. Governor Edmund G. Brown Jr. was largely responsible for Sundesert's defeat. The California State Energy Commission, appointed by the governor, voted 4–1 against the plant. After the state Senate passed a bill exempting the plant from having to dispose of its waste, Brown's allies in the Assembly leadership sent the measure to a committee, where the bill faced an uphill battle. The bill was defeated by a vote of 4 to 7, with three Republicans and one Democrat in favor of the measure and seven Democrats opposed. Sundesert had consumed an enormous amount of the company's effort for six years and a total of more than $106 million.

The South Bay Power Plant was built in 1958. It changed ownership at least four times over the past five decades, including Duke Energy, The Unified Port of San Diego, and LS Power. During its operation, it began burning natural gas instead of fuel oil. At one point, it would generate up to 700 megawatts - enough to power 500,000 homes in Southern California. In 1988, the Port began fighting to decommission and dismantle the plant so that the 13-acre site on which it was built could be put to better use. Eventually, the plant was decommissioned in 2010, but the California Independent System Operator (CAL ISO) had said that two units at the South Bay plant were needed in 2011 to ensure the reliability of the electricity supply, so demolition did not occur until 2012.

From 2022 through 2024, San Diego Gas & Electric hosted an annual EV Fleet Day at its Century Park Campus to engage fleet owners and operators in the service area.

== Controversies ==
=== United States v. San Diego Gas & Electric ===
The Encanto Gas Holder was a natural gas holding station composed of over 9 miles (14 km) of underground 30-inch (760 mm) pipe on about 16 acres (65,000 m^{2}) of land in Lemon Grove, adjacent to the city of San Diego. First brought online in the mid-1950s, the Encanto Gas Holder was decommissioned in 2000–2001 by San Diego Gas and Electric, Sempra as the agent of SDG&E, and the IT Corporation as the main contractor for the decommissioning. TriState was brought on board to abate strips of asbestos-containing pipe coating for another contractor to cut the holder bottle into 40-foot (12 m) sections. TriState was later tasked with stripping the coating at the gas holder site despite employee and nearby residents' concerns over friable asbestos generated as a byproduct of the gross stripping processes employed by SDG&E contractors.

In 2006, SDG&E was indicted by U.S. Attorney Carol C. Lam in the Southern District of California on five counts, including conspiracy, fraud, and three counts of mishandling regulated asbestos-containing materials in violation of the National Emissions Standards for Hazardous Air Pollutants. Additional defendants included SDG&E's director of environmental compliance, an uncertified asbestos removal consultant, and the IT Corporation project manager. Charges were dismissed without prejudice in November 2006, but the defendants were re-indicted in early 2007 on nearly identical charges, and the case was heard in San Diego's federal court in June and July 2007. On July 13, 2007, three guilty verdicts were returned against defendants SDG&E, IT Corporation project manager Kyle Rhuebottom, and SDG&E environmental specialist David "Willie" Williamson, including false statements, failure to provide adequate notice to government agencies of regulated asbestos on the site, and violating asbestos work practice standards to avoid the cost of lawful environmental compliance. SDG&E environmental director Jacquelyn McHugh was found not guilty, and defense attorneys vowed to appeal for unjust prosecution.

In late 2007 U.S. District Judge Dana Sabraw ruled that SDG&E and the workers deserved a new trial. Criminal charges were dismissed against SDG&E on October 6, 2009.

=== 2008 marine helicopter crash lawsuit ===
On September 3, 2008, a jury awarded $55.6 million to the families of four United States Marine aviators killed when their UH-1 helicopter crashed into a 130-foot-tall SDG&E utility tower at Camp Pendleton. The amount awarded included $15.2 million in compensatory damages and $40.4 million in punitive damages. The jury held SDG&E responsible for $9.48 million of the compensation amount and all of the punitive damages.

During the trial, the plaintiffs argued that SDG&E was negligent in its policy of placing warning lights only on towers over 200 feet (61 m) in height. The company said the power line had been on the base for 25 years and that SDG&E would have installed lights if the Marine Corps had asked. Since the crash, the company has installed lights, said Todd Macaluso, the lawyer for the families. SDG&E said that it would appeal the judgment.

=== 2011 county-wide power outage ===
On September 8, 2011, at 3:38 PM Pacific Standard Time, a major power outage left all 1.4 million SDG&E customers without power. The problems started with a fault in an Arizona Public Service substation near Yuma, Arizona, that caused widespread problems in western Arizona and eastern California. In time, SDG&E's system was drawing from the San Onofre Nuclear Generating Station (SONGS) considerably more power than was being produced, pulling it from Los Angeles, and a "safety net" system cut it off from the nuclear plant. Once this happened, SDG&E's system rapidly collapsed due to a mismatch of generation and load, unable to drop load faster than generation was lost. SDG&E implemented its system restoration plan and cautioned its customers to expect a prolonged outage. The outage appears to have been caused by the actions of an employee at APS's North Gila substation in Arizona, and it is unknown why safeguards did not keep the outage limited to the Yuma area.

By Friday morning on the 9th, power had been restored to all 1.4 million SDG&E customers.

=== 2020 Emmanuel Cafferty firing ===
In the wake of the 2020 George Floyd protests and the subsequent attention brought onto topics related to racism and white supremacy, SDG&E became the center of national controversy when it fired one of its employees, Emmanuel Cafferty. Cafferty, a Mexican-American, was fired for allegedly displaying the OK gesture, a sign that had recently become associated with the alt-right and white power movement. Cafferty claimed that he was unaware of the connotations of the sign he was displaying. The story of Cafferty's termination was covered by national news publications and periodicals, and while SDG&E has remained silent on the matter, it has faced scrutiny over the termination. Cafferty later filed a defamation lawsuit against his former employer.

=== Rates ===
San Diego Gas & Electric consistently ranks among the U.S. public utilities with the highest residential electricity rates. According to the California Public Utilities Commission, the price per kilowatt hour for electricity in California roughly doubled between 2013 and 2025. SDG&E's electric rates have increased significantly in recent years, with rates increasing from 28.9 cents per kWh to 47.6 cents per kWh between 2020 and 2024. Concurrently, SDG&E increased rates for customers, San Diego Gas & Electric reported record profits in 2023, making $936 million—a $21 million increase from its 2022 profits of $915 million. Sempra, SDG&E's parent company, announced in February 2024 that the company earned about $1.75 billion in profits in 2023, which came from its California subsidiaries (which include both SDG&E and SoCalGas). SDG&E alone earned a record $936 million. San Diego Gas & Electric profits reached $891 million in 2024.

==== Regulatory Actions ====
On December 19, 2024, the California Public Utilities Commission (CPUC) issued Decision 24-12-074, which adopted a Test Year 2024 base revenue requirement of $2.699 billion, which represents an average monthly bill increase of 2.6-2.7% (or $2.84-$5.48/month) for residential electric customers.
