= Aliso Canyon Oil Field =

Oil field in Los Angeles County, California

Coordinates: 34.3149°N 118.5641°W

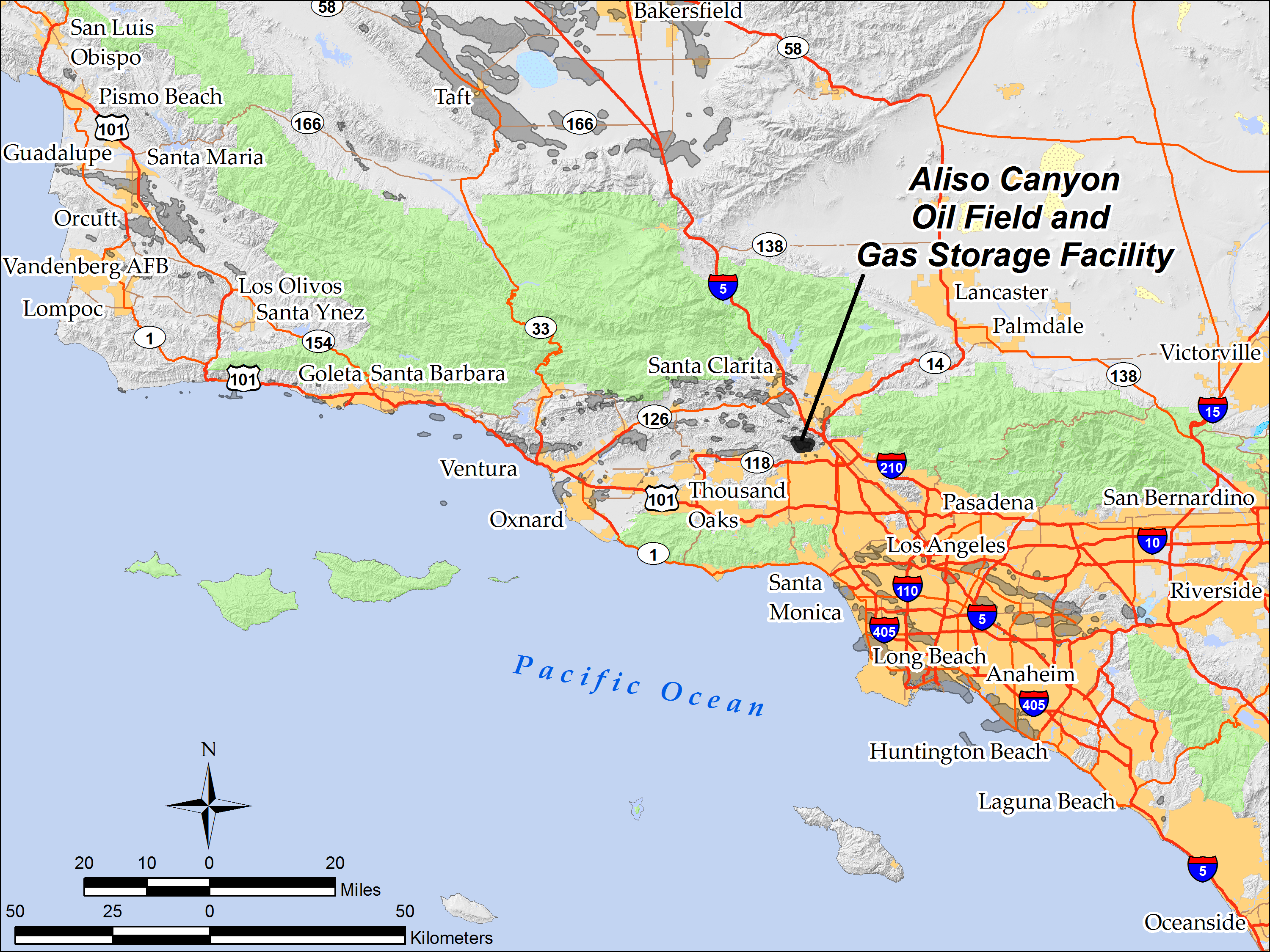
- Location of Aliso Canyon Oil Field in southern California
- Country: United States
- Location: Los Angeles County, California
- Offshore/onshore: onshore
- Operators: Southern California Gas Company, The Termo Company, Crimson Resource Management Corp.

Field history
- Discovery: 1938
- Start of development: 1938
- Start of production: 1938
- Peak year: 1955

Production
- Current production of oil: 566 barrels per day (~28,200 t/a)
- Year of current production of oil: 2014
- Estimated oil in place: 1.724 million barrels (~2.352×10^{5} t)
- Producing formations: Pico Formation, Modelo Formation, Llajas Formation

The Aliso Canyon Oil Field (also Aliso Canyon Natural Gas Storage Field, Aliso Canyon Underground Storage Facility) is an oil field and natural gas storage facility in the Santa Susana Mountains in Los Angeles County, California, north of the Porter Ranch neighborhood of the City of Los Angeles. Discovered in 1938 and quickly developed afterward, the field peaked as an oil producer in the 1950s, but has remained active since its discovery. One of its depleted oil and gas producing formations, the Sesnon-Frew zone, was converted into a gas storage reservoir in 1973 by the Southern California Gas Company, the gas utility servicing the southern half of California. This reservoir is the second-largest natural gas storage site in the western United States, originally with a capacity of over 86 billion cubic feet (Bcf) of natural gas. Currently it is one of four gas storage facilities owned by Southern California Gas, the others being the La Goleta Gas Field west of Santa Barbara, Honor Rancho near Newhall, and Playa del Rey.

Oil production on the field continues from 32 active wells as of 2016. By 2023, the gas storage reservoir has 68 Bcf capacity, and is accessed through 115 gas injection wells, along with approximately 38 miles of pipeline internal to the field. Three operators were active on the field: Southern California Gas Company, The Termo Company, and Crimson Resource Management Corp.

== Geographic setting ==
The field is on the southern slope of the Santa Susana Mountains, an east-west trending range dividing the San Fernando Valley on the south from the Santa Clarita Valley on the north-northeast. With some of its productive wells set at an elevation over 3,000 feet, it is one of the highest and most rugged oil fields in California. The main entrance to the oil field is on Limekiln Canyon Trail where it intersects Sesnon Boulevard. Vehicles must pass a guard station and locked gate to enter.

Land uses in the vicinity of the field include industrial (for the oil and gas field itself), open space, parkland, and residential to the south. Areas to the west, north, and east in the Santa Susana Mountains have been identified as Significant Ecological Areas. The Michael D. Antonovich Open Space Preserve abuts the field on the northeast, and numerous parks in Porter Ranch are adjacent on the south.

Since the field is on the south slope of the Santa Susana Mountains, drainage is to the south into the San Fernando Valley, with runoff into Mormon Canyon, Limekiln Canyon, and Aliso Canyon, which all flow into the Los Angeles River, which then flows south through the Los Angeles Basin and out to the ocean at Long Beach. Vegetation on the field includes a mix of native habitat types, including oak woodlands and Venturan sage scrub, as well as non-native grassland, with many disturbed areas around roads and drilling and production pads. Climate in the area is Mediterranean, with warm, almost rainless summers, and mild and rainy winters. Snow is rare although it can fall at the higher elevations. Wildfires are common, particularly in the summer and fall, and some of the storage field was burned over in the October, 2008 14,000-acre Sesnon Fire.

== Geology ==
The Aliso Canyon field consists of multiple layers of oil and gas bearing sediments in a southeast-plunging anticline bounded on the north by the Santa Susana Fault Zone and on the west-northwest by the Frew Fault. These tectonic features form a structural trap keeping oil in place. The layered Tertiary sedimentary zones within the anticline resemble a layer-cake elevated on the northwest, with some of the layers containing oil and gas, and other impermeable layers between them, keeping them separate. Older Cretaceous sedimentary rocks have been forced over the top by motion along the Frew Fault.

The uppermost oil-bearing stratigraphic unit is the Pliocene-age Pico Formation, which contains the Aliso, Porter, and Upper, Middle, and Lower Del Aliso zones, from top to bottom, ranging in depth from about 4,500 to 8,000 feet. Underneath the Pico is the Middle Miocene Modelo Formation, and beneath that, bounded by an unconformity, the Eocene-age Llajas Formation. Since these units are both permeable and in direct contact, they form a single productive zone, the Sesnon-Frew, the largest of the field's zones and the one used by SoCalGas for gas storage. This unit has an average depth of about 9,000 feet, and averages about 160 feet thick. Beneath the Sesnon-Frew are marine sediments of Cretaceous age, not known to contain oil, and below that crystalline basement rocks of Cretaceous age or older.

== History and production ==
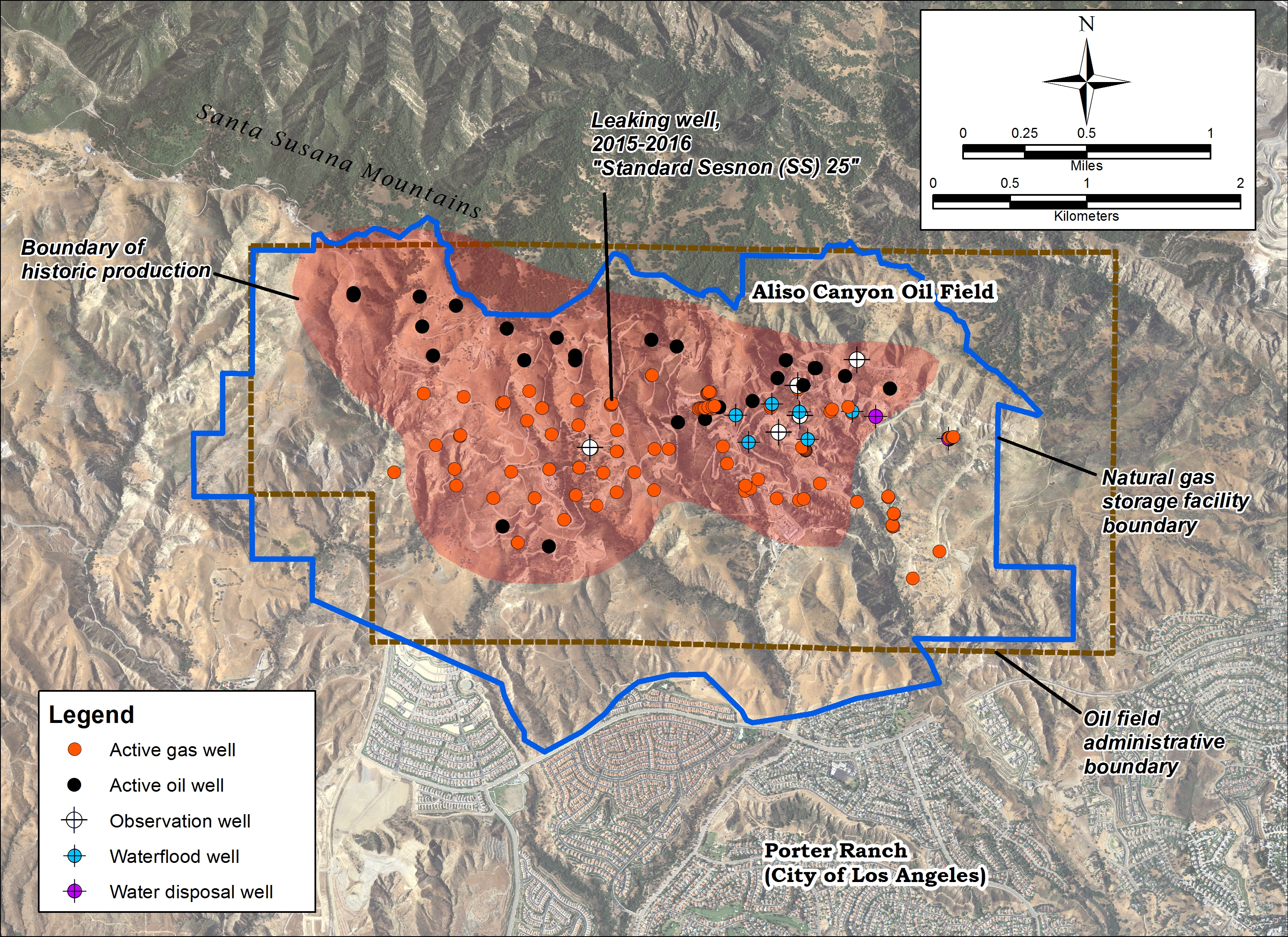
Detail of the Aliso Canyon field. Active oil wells are black dots; active gas injection wells are orange dots.

The Santa Susana Mountains are one of several anticlinal formations within the Ventura Basin, and as such have long been of interest to those looking for oil. The oldest oil well in California, and the oldest commercially viable oil well in the western United States, was at the Pico Canyon Area of the Newhall Oil Field less than five miles northwest of the Aliso field boundary, also in the Santa Susana Mountains. J. Paul Getty's Tidewater Associated Oil Company drilled the discovery well for the Aliso field in 1938, finding oil in the Porter zone, 5,393 feet below ground surface. Other producing zones were discovered not long after, including Del Aliso zone in 1938, and the Sesnon-Frew zone in 1940. Several companies operated the field in the early years, including Tidewater, Standard Oil of California, Porter Sesnon et al., Porter Oil Co., Carlton Beal and Associates, and M.L. Orcutt. By the middle of 1959, there were 118 producing wells on the entire field, and over 32 million barrels of oil had been withdrawn.

Early in production, the Sesnon-Frew zone had been identified as having a strong gas cap, with some wells being completed in gas-only portions of the reservoir, needing to be deepenend. The overproduction of gas led to accusations of wasting, and litigation commenced with Standard Oil and Tidewater accusing Carlton Beal of wasting gas (lacking a modern pipeline transport system, natural gas at this time was not always retained for use – it was commonly flared or just vented to the atmosphere). The State Oil and Gas Supervisor ruled in favor of Standard and Tidewater and limited production on the Sesnon pool to reduce the waste.

One enhanced recovery technique, waterflooding, was used on the field, beginning in 1976. The Del Aliso zone was produced this way as conventional oil production began to decline. In this method, water pumped up with oil is disposed by being pumped back into the same formation from which it came, restoring reservoir pressure and pushing the remaining reservoir fluid to other recovery wells, even though it becomes more and more diluted with time.

Suburban developments of the San Fernando Valley began approaching the field after it had already been fully developed, with some of the first residential housing in Porter Ranch appearing in the 1960s, but the main buildout started in the 1970s. Development continued into the first decade of the 21st century, expanding into the foothills right up to the SoCalGas property line. Many of these projects were master-planned developments, including gated communities, in one of San Fernando Valley's most affluent areas.

== Conversion to gas storage ==
By the early 1970s the Sesnon zone was depleted of oil. As it was an enormous and structurally sound reservoir, with an average depth of about 9,000 feet, and centrally located in the distribution area of Pacific Lighting (an ancestor of Southern California Gas Company), it was ideal to use as a storage reservoir for gas for the local utility. Pacific Lighting bought rights to that portion of the field from Getty's Tidewater, and worked over the old oil production wells, many dating from 1940s and 1950s, to turn them into gas injection wells. The Aliso Canyon Natural Gas Storage Facility, as this repurposed part of the oil field became known, became the largest gas storage reservoir owned by SoCalGas and the second largest in the western United States. Storage fields such as the four maintained by SoCalGas are necessary to balance the load between summer and winter months; gas can be withdrawn during the winter, when it is in high demand, and injected back into the reservoir during the warmer months. Aliso Canyon was ideally placed near the center of SoCalGas's service region, and connected to the system by an extensive pipeline network.

In 2009 SoCalGas proposed an expansion and upgrade of the storage facility involving replacement of the obsolete gas turbine compressors with more up-to-date electric versions. This project would increase the gas injection capacity of the site from 300 million to 450 million cubic feet per day, and remove the compressors which were installed in 1971 when the storage facility was first being developed. It would also move guard houses and some other structures, build a substation on the field, and upgrade various transmission and telecommunications lines. After environmental review through draft and final Environmental Impact Reports as required by the California Environmental Quality Act (CEQA), the project was approved and construction began in 2014.

Gas wells on the site are old, and have required considerable maintenance in recent years. Of 229 storage wells on the site, half were more than 57 years old as of July 2014. Casing, tubing, and wellhead leaks have occurred in recent years. For example, in 2013, two wells were found with casing leaks, four with tubing leaks, and two with leaks at the wellhead. In 2008, one well – "Porter 50A" – was found to have a gas pressure of 400 pounds per square inch on the surface annulus, an indication of a serious underground leak and potential safety hazard; this well was immediately removed from service, and on investigation corrosion was discovered along a 600-foot stretch of the production casing, ending more than 1000 feet below ground surface. SoCalGas designed a Storage Integrity Management Program to address these deficiences, along with a budget, and presented it to the State Public Utility Commission in 2014.

Two other oil companies continue to operate on the field, outside of the SoCalGas facility boundary: The Termo Company and Crimson Resource Management Corp. These companies produce oil from other, shallower zones than the Sesnon-Frew zone that SoCalGas uses for gas storage. The Termo Company proposed an expansion of their operation, adding another 12 wells to the 15 they already had at the end of 2015, but put their plans on hold after the methane gas eruption from SoCalGas well Standard Sesnon 25 that began on October 23, 2015.

== 2015–2016 methane gas blowout ==
A dramatic break somewhere along the length of an 8,750-foot injection well casing resulted in a gigantic methane eruption from the field on October 23, 2015, allowing the escape of around 60 million cubic feet of methane per day at first, before the pressure was reduced. The well, Standard Sesnon 25 ("SS 25") had originally been installed in 1953, and reworked as a gas injection well in 1973, but lacked a blowout prevention valve, as it had not been considered a priority given the well's position, at the time, far from a populated area. Fallout from the methane cloud, in the form of oily droplets and persistent noxious odors, caused the evacuation of over 6,000 families, who relocated to hotels and other rentals at SoCalGas's expense throughout the region. Another 10,000 homes received air-purification systems at the company's expense. On Dec. 4, 2015, SoCalGas commenced drilling a relief well to stop the natural gas blowout by plugging the damaged well at its base. The relief well intercepted the base of the well on Feb. 11, 2016, and the company began pumping heavy fluids to temporarily control the flow of gas out of the well. SoCalGas was able to plug the leak permanently on February 18, 2016. Overall the well is estimated to have released over 120,000 metric tons of natural gas, the largest such release in U.S. history.

In March 2016, Termo Company was fined $75,000 for piping in methane emissions from another natural gas leak in what the Division of Oil, Gas, and Geothermal Resources called "brazen and intentional violations of state law".

Governor of California Jerry Brown issued an executive order banning natural gas injection until all of the wells were thoroughly tested for corrosion and leaks. On May 10, 2016, Governor Brown signed Senate Bill 380, introduced in the California State Senate by Fran Pavley, into law. The bill extended the moratorium on gas injection, and requires the state to consider permanently shutting down this gas storage facility.

The storage started operating again at reduced capacity of 29 Bcf in 2017, increased to 41 Bcf in 2021, and to in 68 Bcf in 2023.
