= Porter Ranch Town Center =

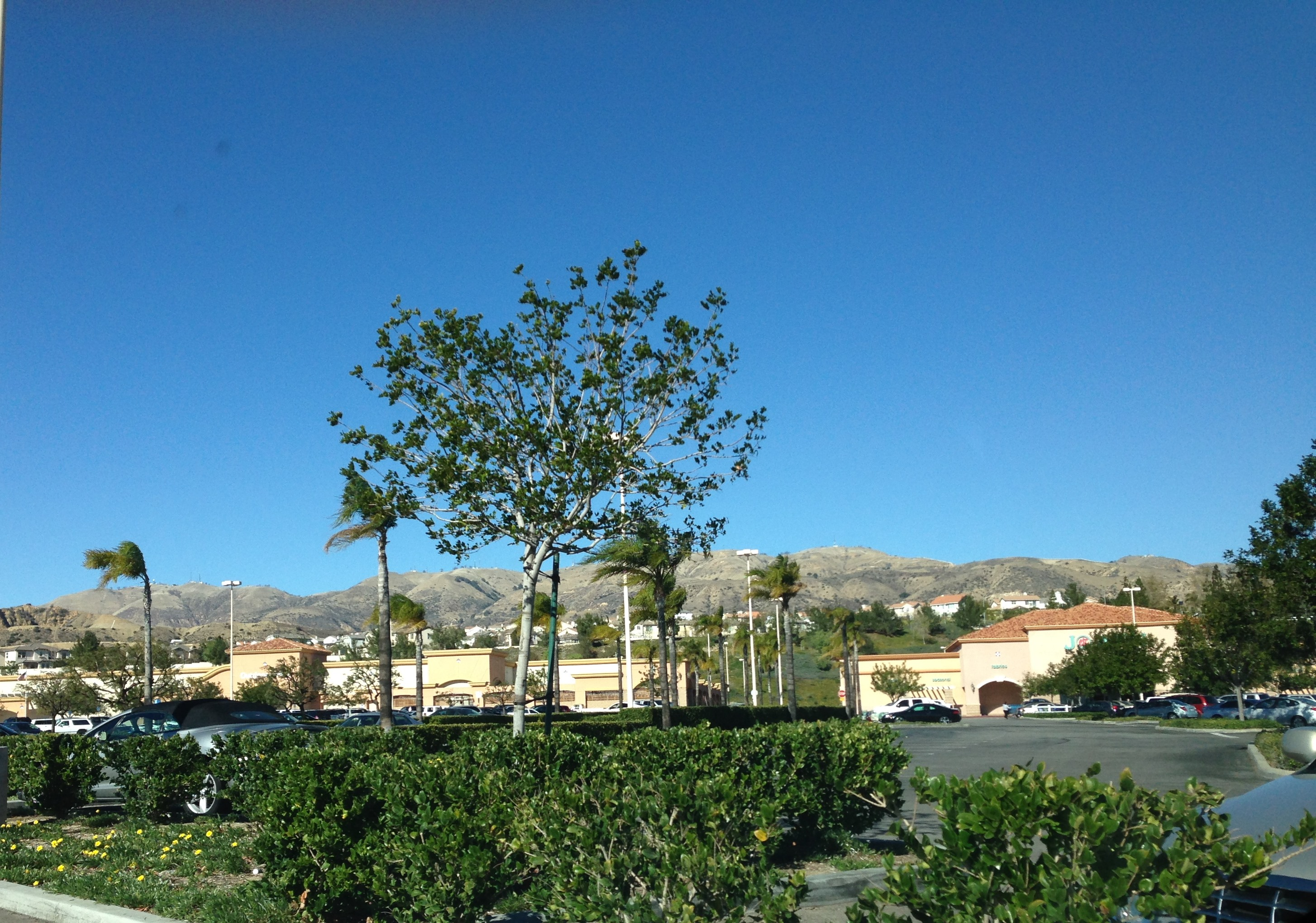
- Porter Ranch in 2014
- Location: Porter Ranch, California
- Coordinates: 34.2764°N 118.5667°W
- Opened: May 2, 2008
- Floor area: 560,000 sq ft (52,026 m^{2})

Porter Ranch Town Center is a shopping center located in Porter Ranch, Los Angeles, California, United States. It is anchored by Walmart, Ralphs, Burlington and Best Buy. The center has 45 tenants scattered throughout the shopping center and is located next to the Ronald Reagan Freeway.

== History ==
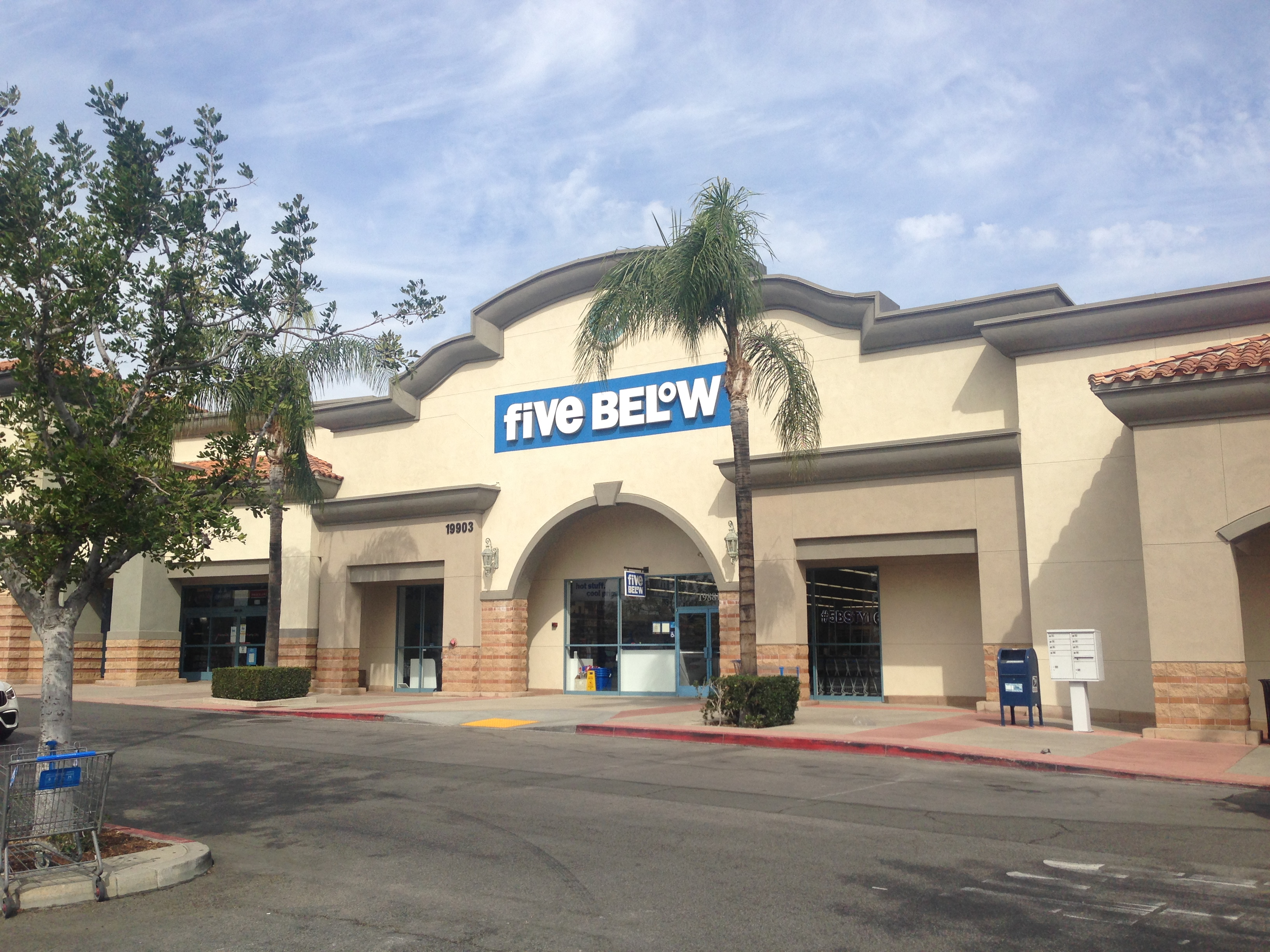
The Five Below store in the Porter Ranch Center

The Porter Ranch master development plan was first proposed in 1989 and had been in the talks for a decade before the first phase, which included a new 600,000 sq ft (56,000 m^{2}) of commercial and retail alongside 3,400 new homes and townhomes along the Santa Susana Hills, was finally approved in 1990 by Hal Bernson. The Porter Ranch Specific Plan and Porter Ranch Land Use and Transportation Specific Plan was adopted on September 4, 1990, and the Porter Ranch Town Center became the first phase. The plan has been through many revisions and it was finally reduced from 2,000,000 sq ft (190,000 m^{2}) to 600,000 sq ft (56,000 m^{2}). After the Porter Ranch Town Center was constructed by Shappell Industries, which built most of the housing developments in Porter Ranch, it was seen as the largest single development in Los Angeles.

In 2010, the addition of a medical office was created across from the Shopping Plaza. During 2015, Porter Ranch Gas Blowout, the Porter Ranch Town Center was used as a community resource center where local residents were provided weekly customer bulletins by mail and email, as well as calls and text notification for significant events, and has established a community advisory committee. It has been used as a community center in past disasters and wildfires as well.

== Controversies ==
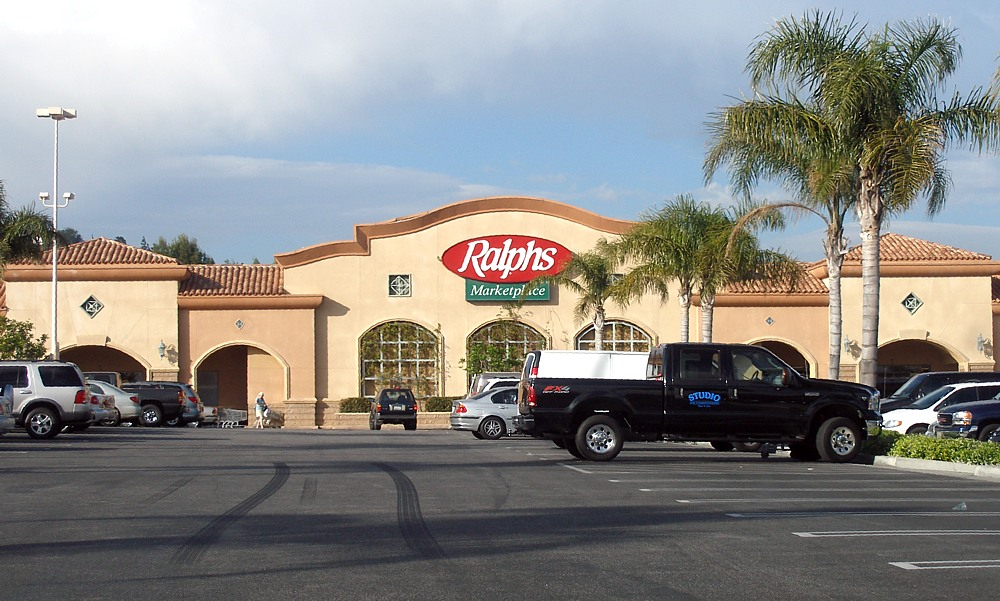
The Ralphs Fresh Fare in Porter Ranch at the Porter Ranch Town Center

The proposal of a new commercial retail center was disapproved by local residents, claiming that the center would host big box centers rather than luxury boutiques. The 1990s economic slump has been noted as one of the reasons for the change in the tenants and why the Porter Ranch Town Center was different from what the local community envisioned, and the builders, Shappell Industries, have stayed away from addressing the upset community. The announced tenant, a Walmart, becoming an anchor caused community opposition when the shopping center was opened.

== See also ==
- Glendale Americana
- The Grove
- The Vineyards at Porter Ranch
