= Southern California Gas Company =

Natural gas utility company in California

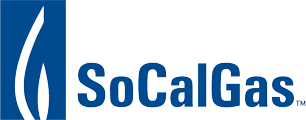
- Trade name: SoCalGas
- Type: Subsidiary
- Industry: Utilities
- Founded: 1867; 159 years ago
- Headquarters: Los Angeles, California, United States
- Key people: Rodger Schwecke (CEO)
- Products: Natural Gas
- Parent: Sempra
- Website: www.socalgas.com

The Southern California Gas Company (trading as SoCalGas) is a utility company based in Los Angeles, California, and a subsidiary of Sempra. It is the primary provider of natural gas to Los Angeles and Southern California.

== Overview ==
Its headquarters are located in Gas Company Tower in downtown Los Angeles.

SoCalGas provides natural gas service for approximately 21.6 million customers, spanning roughly 20,000 square miles of California, extending from Visalia in the north to the Mexican border in the south. Gas service for San Diego County is provided by sister utility San Diego Gas & Electric, and Southwest Gas and the Long Beach Gas & Oil Department (LBGO) carve out small portions of the Southern California area for natural gas delivery.

The company provides gas service for all or part of the following counties:

- Fresno
- Imperial
- Kern
- Kings
- Los Angeles
- Orange
- Riverside
- San Bernardino
- San Luis Obispo
- Santa Barbara
- Tulare
- Ventura

== History ==
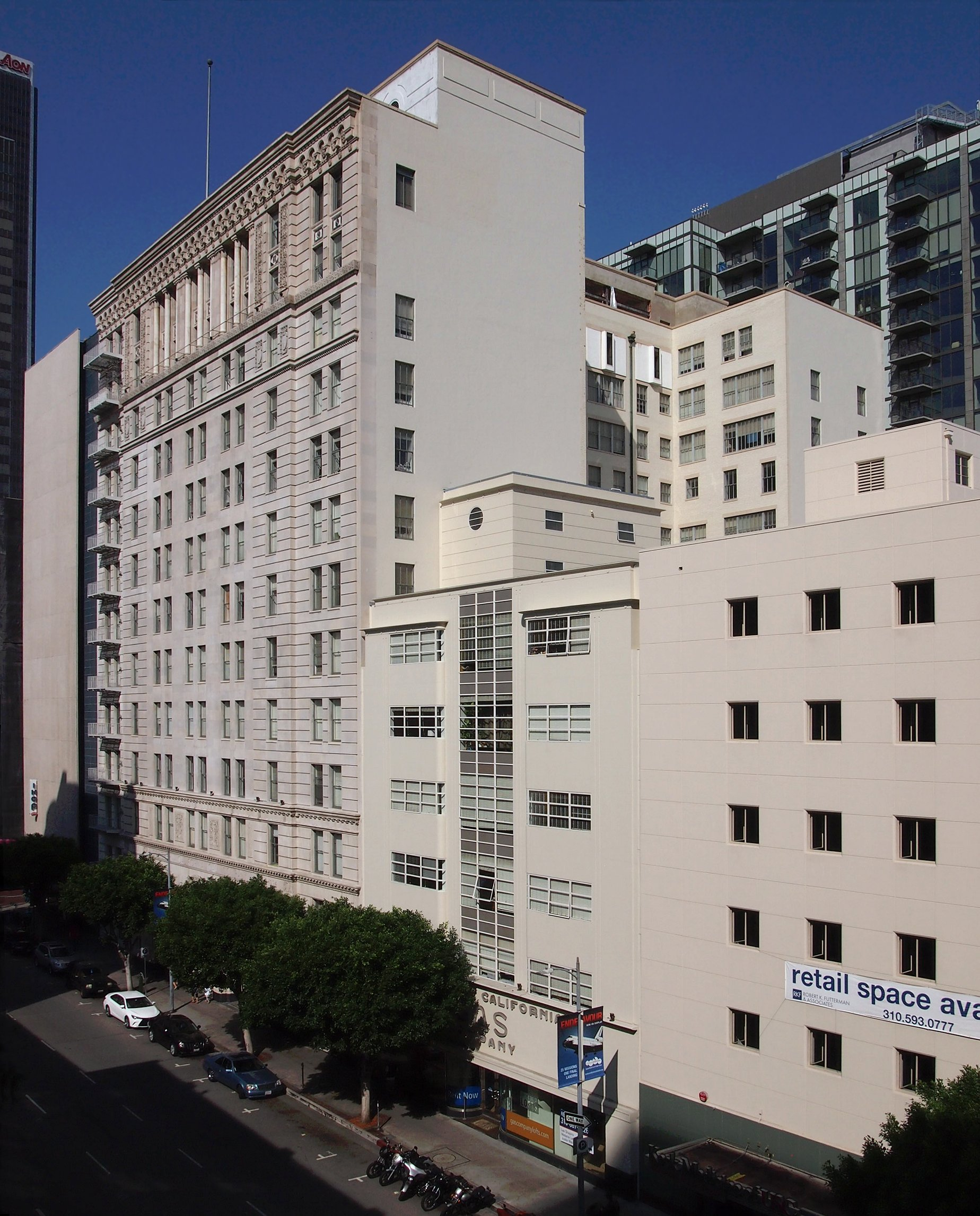
The former Southern California Gas Company Complex on Flower Street, now lofts

This gas company's roots trace back to the 1800s when new settlers arrived in Los Angeles in search of a new frontier. In 1867, Los Angeles Gas Company, the forerunner of today's Southern California Gas Company, installed 43 new gas lamps along Main Street. The gas lighting business was run by five entrepreneurs who manufactured the gas from asphalt, a tar-like substance, and later from oil.

The company was enjoying modest success until Thomas Edison introduced his electric light in 1879. With the future of the gas lamp business uncertain, the company began looking for other uses for gas, and Los Angeles soon had its first gas stove and heater. Meanwhile, Pacific Enterprises was looking to expand its gas business. Founded in San Francisco in 1886 as Pacific Lighting, the company bought several small gas manufacturing and distribution companies in the area, including the Los Angeles Gas Company in 1890. These companies ultimately became Southern California Gas Company.

By the early 20th century, natural gas—a colorless, odorless gas found in association with oil underground—was starting to gain attention. The breakthrough came with the discovery of the Buena Vista Oil Field near Taft, California in 1909, which included a huge reservoir of natural gas. Since natural gas had twice the heating value of manufactured gas, the company took the bold step to convert its system to natural gas and build pipelines throughout the state. Natural gas was soon found throughout the country, and demand for the fuel was rapidly growing. To meet customer demand, the company began storing gas in large holding tanks. In 1941, the company introduced a new system to the Southwest United States: underground storage of natural gas. By 2016, the company had four separate underground storage facilities, all of them depleted oil and gas fields repurposed as gas storage. The four are, in order from largest to smallest, the Aliso Canyon field, north of Porter Ranch; Honor Rancho, near Newhall; the La Goleta Gas Field adjacent to Goleta; and the Playa del Rey storage facility, north of Playa del Rey, near the Los Angeles International Airport.

As Southern California's population grew, so too, did the company, eventually becoming the nation's largest natural gas distribution utility, serving 19.5 million people through 5.5 million gas meters in more than 530 communities. Headquartered in Los Angeles, Southern California Gas Company is a subsidiary of Sempra, a Fortune 500 company based in San Diego. Its service area encompasses 23,000 sq mi (60,000 km^{2}) of diverse terrain throughout most of Central and Southern California, from just south of Sanger to the Mexican border.

In late 2012, the company began the Advanced Meter Installation (AMI) Project that consists of upgrading over 6 million gas meters with the new Advanced Meter communication device. This device is attached to an analog gas meter that automatically and securely transfers gas usage information to the company's customer service and billing centers. The California Public Utilities Commission (CPUC) has approved a budget of $1.05 billion for this project, which is expected to be completed in 2017.

On March 6, 2019, SoCalGas announced a plan to replace 20 percent of its traditional natural gas supply with renewable natural gas (RNG) by 2030. SoCalGas aims to be the cleanest natural gas utility in North America, which it plans to achieve by delivering increasingly renewable energy to its customers. As part of this effort, SoCalGas has partnered with startup Twelve to convert CO_{2} from raw biogas into methane.

== Environmental impact ==
A gas leak from the underground Aliso Canyon gas storage started in October 2015 releasing methane uncontrollably. By December 2015, thousands of people from Porter Ranch had been temporarily relocated and the leak had added more than 150 million pounds of methane to the atmosphere. The NGO Environmental Defense Fund has called the incident "unprecedented for California" and compared the leak's continuous output of greenhouse gas emissions to that of 7 million cars or "8 or 9 coal-fired plants". The 20-year climate impact of this leak is estimated to be the same as burning a billion gallons of gasoline. The incident has been called "the biggest environmental disaster since the Deepwater Horizon oil spill" by journalists.

The company has advocated for mixing biogas into existing natural gas pipelines. However, California state officials have taken the position that biogas is "better used in hard-to-electrify sectors of the economy-- like aviation, heavy industry and long-haul trucking."

== Pipelines ==
- California Energy Commission map (PDF)
- 1944: in light of the 1943/1944 gas shortage crisis in Southern California, new storage capacity needed. 36 miles of 16-inch pipe from the La Goleta Gas Field to the (Southern Counties Co. owned) Venture compressor station built by Southern Counties Gas Company ($1,083,290), also built a dehydration plant at Ventura. 66 miles of 18-inch pipe and 12 miles of 22-inch pipe between Ventura and Los Angeles built by the Southern California Gas Company ($2,368,900), pipe for this segment to be built by the Youngstown Sheet and Tube Co. and the A. O. Smith Company of Milwaukee. 164,000,000cuft capacity planned, increase of Goleta capacity from 60,000,000 to 200,000,000cuft stated at completion. Pacific Lightning Corp. added 4 new dry gas wells tapping into old resources. announce: details:
- Texas-California Pipe Line (1947): Federal Power Commission Docket No. G-675. 214 miles of 30-inch pipeline between Blythe and Santa Fe Springs, built in cooperation with the Southern Counties Gas Company, connecting to the 720 mile 26-inch El Paso Natural Gas Company line between the Eunice compressor station in Lea County, New Mexico and Blythe being constructed concurrently. Was initially planned to be 26-inch. Pipes worth $6,000,000 produced by Consolidated Steel (Maywood plant), steel plates made by Geneva Steel from Utah iron ore. 175,000,000cuft/day initially and 305,000,000cuft/day eventually with further option of the 30-inch segment to 400,000,000cuft/day. (Note: The 30-inch California portion should have that extra capacity over the 26-inch EPNG portion, but the capacity of the 30-inch segment is raised to 405,000,000cuft/day when 88 miles of additional pipe is laid in G-1079) Cost: $16,225,000 (California), $53,800,000 (EPNG). 30 year delivery contracts. H. C. Price Co. contracted to build the California segment at an estimated cost of $3,750,000. The line became operational on 13 November 1947, the final length was stated as 212.6 miles. Throughput reaches a new peak of 325,000,000cuft/day in March 1950.
  - operation of existing 10 mile 26-inch segment between Santa Fe Springs and Spence Street station as the final leg of the Texas-California pipeline (G-675) (conjecture: the Los Angeles 26-inch distribution system previously ended at Santa Fe Springs or there was a 26-inch pipeline built to carry oil from the Santa Fe Springs field).
  - 8.3 miles of 30-inch pipe between Rivera and Garvey jointly with Southern Counties Gas Co. and 4 miles of 30-inch pipe by Southern California Gas Co. exclusively between Garvey and Alhambra. Docket No. G-1045, authorized 28 July 1948. (conjecture: this is the Pasadena lateral referred to as the connection point for the 88 mile segment of G-1079).
  - 88 miles of 30-inch pipe to loop, in part, the Texas-California Pipeline from Whitewater to a junction on the Pasadena lateral near Montebello, Docket No. G-1079. WIth an additional 4,000hp at Blythe, this raises the capacity of the section from Blythe to Los Angeles from 305 to 405,000,000cuft/day. Authorized 10 September 1948. See also: El Paso Natural Gas Docket No. G-1051. (conjecture: this must obviously be the northern arm of the split south of San Bernardino and lays on the same right-of-way to the east of the split for some length).
    - 15 miles of 30-inch pipe from Rivera to the regulating station at Slauson Boulevard and Western Avenue (the other part of G-1079, but not connected to the 88 mile segment)
- Imperial Valley Pipe Line (1948), FPC Docket No. G-1040. 73 mile 8-inch (Note: discovered sources are not clear and consistent) branch from the Texas-California Line near Desert Center to Calexico, 16,000,000cuft/day (also stated: 2,546,000,000cuft/year) in the firth year expected. est. cost $1,150,000. Authorized June 1948. Finished 16 December 1948. 1-page American Gas Journal article (March 1948):
- 35 mile portion in RIverside County of the Moreno Line, a 85 mile, 16-inch pipeline connecting to the 30-inch Texas-California Line near Moreno. The Riverside County portion, FPC Docket No. G-1157 is a Southern Counties Gas Company - only project. Capacity of 40,000,000cuft/day of El Paso out of state natural gas. Estimated cost $1,931,700. Authorized 25 May 1949. The 50 mile San Diego County portion is G-1162. The point of connection is on the county border line.
