= Luz del Sur =

Peruvian utility company

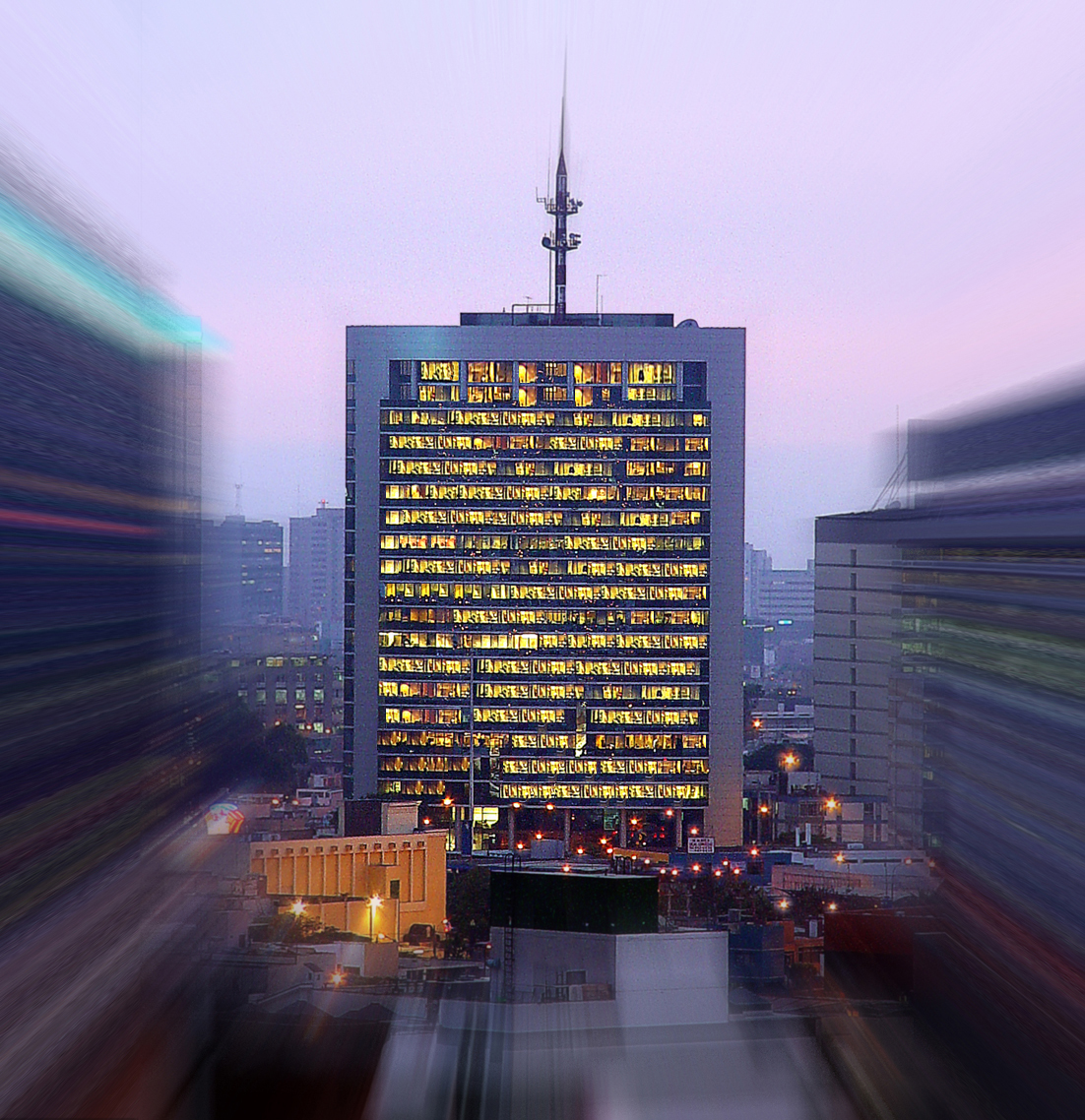
Luz del Sur headquarters in San Isidro, Lima.

Luz del Sur (BVL: LUSURC1) is a Peruvian utility company involved in electric power distribution to more than 800 thousand customers in 30 districts in the southeast of Lima. It is one of the largest electricity distributors in Peru, holding over 30% of the electricity distribution market. As an electricity distributor Luz del Sur is considered a natural monopoly. Luz del Sur's CEO since 1999 is Mile Cacic, an economist by trade.

Luz del Sur also provides services such as maintaining internal installations and electrical networks, industrial and commercial lightning projects as well as energy diagnoses. The company’s subsidiaries include Inmobiliaria Luz del Sur SA, a company active in the real estate sector; Luz del Sur International AVV, an investment company with operations established in Aruba (West Indies); and Edecanete SA, a company also engaged in electric power distribution.

On January 19, 2011, AEI (indirect owner of 37.97% of Luz del Sur) reported that it had entered into an agreement with Sempra Energy International to sell it its entire stake in the company.

As of 2016, company is building a 100-megawatt hydroelectric power plant on the Urubamba River in the Cusco region, "Santa Teresa". Luz del Sur has also studied several other possible projects, including a 268-MW hydroelectric power plant (which would have been "Santa Teresa II"), as well as a 192-MW power plant in the Junin region. It performed the Santa Teresa II feasibility study in 2013, and the Junin region plant study in 2015.

In the year 2020, the Chinese company, China Yangtze Power of the China Three Gorges Corporation acquired this company.
