= Aliso Canyon gas leak =

Massive natural gas leak in southern California

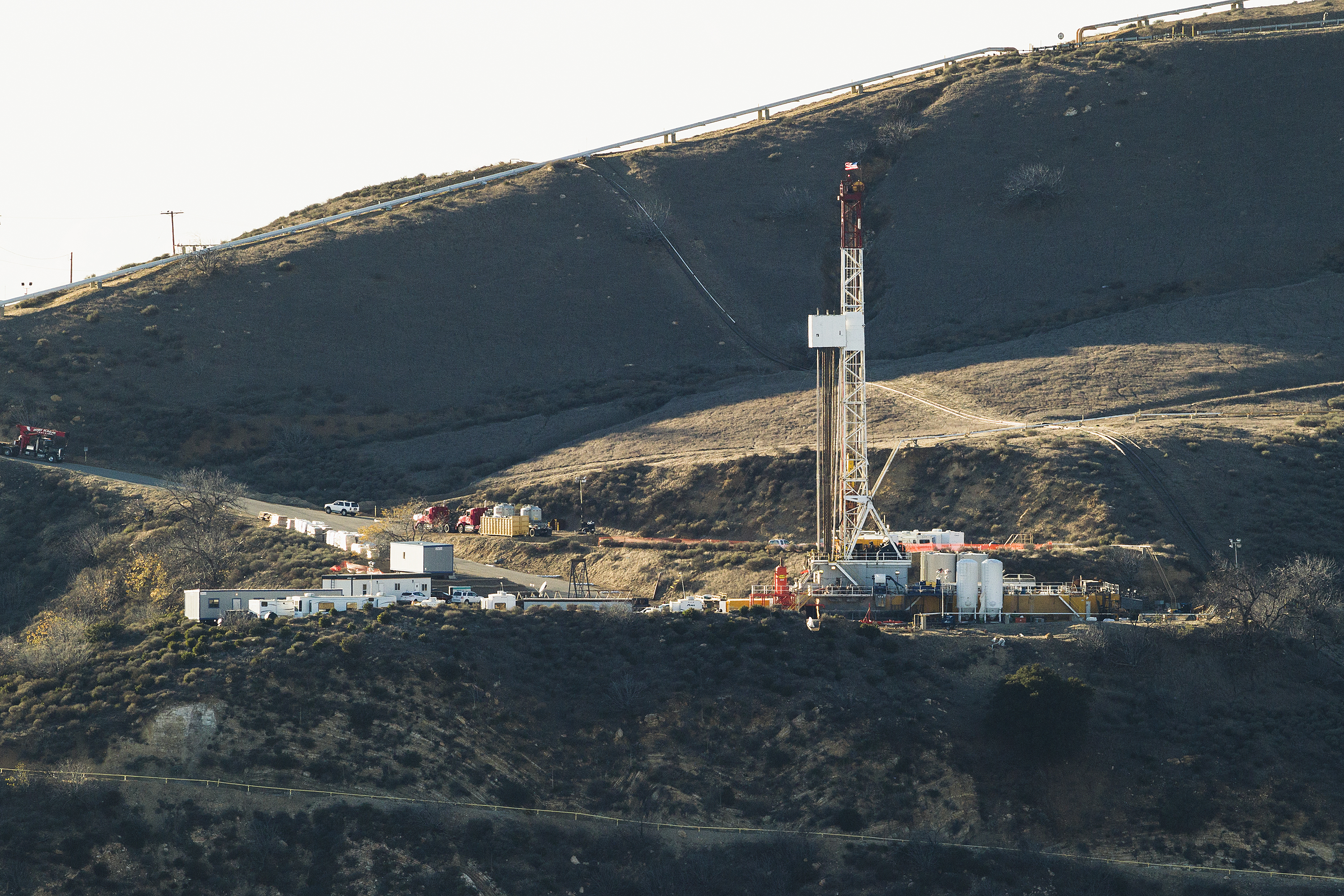
- Aliso Canyon relief well being drilled on December 14, 2015
- Duration: October 23, 2015 – February 18, 2016
- Location: Aliso Canyon Oil Field, Porter Ranch, Los Angeles, California; 34°18′54″N 118°33′51″W
- Also known as: Porter Ranch gas leak / blowout
- Type: Gas leak / blowout

Aliso Canyon (the Los Angeles metropolitan area)

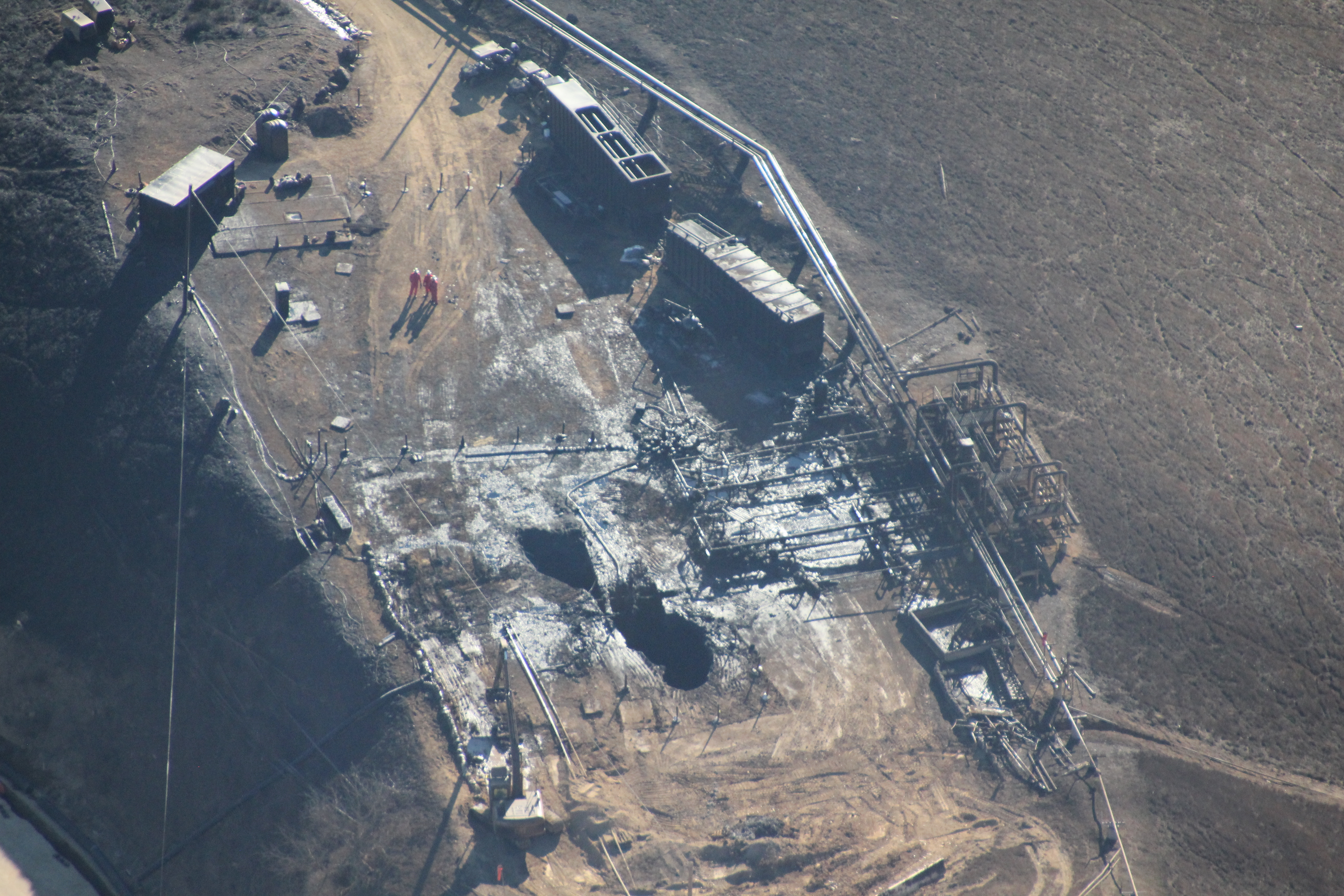
Aliso Canyon SS 25 wellhead, December 17, 2015. Note subsidence craters at center, apparently from the attempts to plug the leaking well.

The Aliso Canyon gas leak (also called Porter Ranch gas leak and Porter Ranch gas blowout) was a massive methane leak in the Santa Susana Mountains near the neighborhood of Porter Ranch in the city of Los Angeles, California, United States. Discovered on October 23, 2015, gas was escaping from a well within the Aliso Canyon underground storage facility. This second-largest gas storage facility of its kind in the United States belongs to the Southern California Gas Company (SoCal Gas), a subsidiary of Sempra Energy. On January 6, 2016, Governor Jerry Brown issued a state of emergency. On February 11, the gas company reported that it had the leak under control. On February 18, state officials announced that the leak was permanently plugged.

An estimated 97,100 tonnes (95,600 long tons; 107,000 short tons) of methane and 7,300 tonnes (7,200 long tons; 8,000 short tons) of ethane were released into the atmosphere. The initial effect of the release increased the estimated 5.3 Gt of methane in the Earth's atmosphere by about 0.002%, diminishing to half that in 6–8 years.

It was widely reported to have been the worst single natural gas leak in U.S. history in terms of its environmental impact.

The entire rest of the South Coast Air Basin combined, with a population of about 18 million people, emits approximately 413,000 tonnes of methane and 23,000 tonnes of ethane annually. The Aliso gas leak's carbon footprint could be larger than the Deepwater Horizon oil spill in the Gulf of Mexico.

In comparison, a remote sensing satellite found that the Raspadskaya coal mine is releasing 762,120 metric tons, or 832,200 short tons, of methane every year, with no remediation planned.

The storage started operating again at reduced capacity of 29 Bcf in 2017, increased to 41 Bcf in 2021, and to in 68 Bcf in 2023.

== Facility ==
After oil was discovered at Aliso Canyon in 1938, J. Paul Getty's Tidewater Associated Oil Company produced oil and gas until the Sesnon-Frew reservoir, the largest reservoir within the oil field, was depleted in the early 1970s. On December 18, 1968, a blowout and fire occurred at one of the wells when an operator attempted to remove two gas-lift valves, destroying equipment but causing no injuries. Getty sold his portion of the field to Pacific Lighting Company, a gas company, which repurposed it to gas storage in 1972. As opposed to current practice, older wells were not sealed to the surrounding rock formation, including their often more than one mile of steel casing. Today, "cement from the surface of the ground to the bottom of the well [...] makes the casings stronger and protects them from water." The Aliso Canyon natural gas storage facility contains 115 wells tapping a reservoir that "hold[s] up to 86 billion cubic feet of natural gas for distribution to residences, businesses, and electric utilities in the L.A. basin". The field is the second largest storage facility of its kind in the United States.

== Discovery of leak ==
Southern California Gas Company said the leak in well SS-25 was discovered "on October 23 during one of its twice-daily well observations." Residents of the nearby Porter Ranch reported what they thought was a home with a major leak on October 23, 2015. SoCal Gas "went from home to home to home, giving everybody the A-OK and [...] didn't admit to having a gas leak until [...] probably around the 28th of October."

Local residents believed the gas blowout started before SoCal Gas admitted to discovering it, and many residents reported having unexplained illnesses a week or so earlier. According to KPCC's website, some residents posted complaints of earlier symptoms on a Porter Ranch gas leak Facebook page.

This event has been called a blowout in many news reports and by the Attorney General of California, Xavier Becerra. For instance, a February 2016 article in the Orange County Register called "Gas facility that had blowout over Porter Ranch will have to play by new rules." stated "in the case of the blown-out well, the casing is believed to have failed under high pressure, allowing the gas to escape." According to OSHA's website, a blowout is "an uncontrolled flow of gas, oil, or other well fluids" from a well."

As of February 1, 2016, the SS-25 well released an estimated 91,000 metric tons of methane gas." The Huffington Post said that "while this gas blowout has prompted comparisons to BP's oil well failure in the Gulf of Mexico in 2010 and the Exxon Valdez oil spill in Alaska in 1989, experts say this leak will have further-reaching environmental consequences."

== Causes ==
The source of the leak was a metal pipe in a breached 7-inch (180 mm) casing of injection well "Standard Sesnon 25" (SS 25) that lies 8,750 feet (2,670 m) deep. SoCal Gas had hypothesized that the leak was no more than 500 feet (150 m) down in the column used to move gas in and out of the well. Well SS 25 was drilled in 1953 and initially had safety valves, which were removed in 1979 because the valves were old and leaking. Because the well was not considered "critical, that is, one within 100 feet of a road or a park, or within 300 feet of a home", the valves were only removed and not replaced. Multiple safety valves had been removed from the Aliso Canyon/Porter Ranch 1950s-era pipes in 1979, and were never replaced, a fact that was also confirmed by a special investigation into the leak by Congressman Brad Sherman's office. The atmospheric scientist Steve Conley said the wellhead in Aliso Canyon was 61 years old and he was not "shock[ed] that it failed". One reason for the casing failure may have been gas flow not just through the tubing, but also through the casing "in order to meet the demand of a customer", as told by an injection well expert of Texas A&M University interviewed by NPR.

On December 7, 2015, an anonymous video was published that showed a cloud of methane gas hovering over the community of Porter Ranch. The image was captured with an infrared camera, showing the extent of the otherwise invisible plume.

On May 17, 2019, the California Public Utilities Commission announced that Blade Energy Partners had completed their root cause analysis of the gas leak that occurred on October 23, 2015. The principal findings from the root cause analysis include:

- The leak's direct cause was a rupture of the outer 7-inch well casing due to microbial corrosion from the outside resulting from contact with groundwater.
- SoCal Gas did not conduct detailed follow-up inspections or analyses after previous leaks. Blade Energy identified more than 60 casing leaks at Aliso Canyon before the October 2015 incident going back to the 1970s, but no failure investigations were conducted by SoCal Gas.
- SoCal Gas lacked any form of risk assessment focused on well integrity management and lacked systematic practices of external corrosion protection and a real-time, continuous pressure monitoring system for well surveillance.
- Updated well safety practices and regulations adopted by the California Geologic Energy Management Division address most of the root causes of the leak identified during Blade Energy's investigation.

On May 17, 2019, the California Public Utilities Commission also published a video describing the details of the leak.

In response to the report from Blade Energy, SoCal Gas issued a response stating "Blade's report confirms SoCal Gas complied with gas storage regulations in existence at the time of the leak. Blade Energy also determined that SoCal Gas' updated practices in 2019 and new state regulations address most, if not all, of the causes identified in the report."

== Emissions ==
Natural gas consists largely of methane, an invisible and odorless greenhouse gas with a global warming potential 86 times greater than carbon dioxide in a 20-year time frame, tailing off to about 29 times the effect of carbon dioxide in a 100-year time frame on a mass-per-mass basis. The leak initially released about 44,000 kilograms (kg) of methane per hour or 1,200 tons of methane every day, which in terms of greenhouse gas output per month compares with the equivalent effluvia from 200,000 cars in a year. On January 14, 2016, Time magazine compared the 1.6 million lb of methane released each day to the emissions of six coal-fired powerplants, 2.2 million cows per day, or 4.5 million cars. As of January 2016, the latest methane measurement per the California Air Resources Board (Carb) was from December 22, 2015, and had decreased from a peak of 58,000±12,000 kg/h to 30,300 kg/h, the equivalent of more than 1.4 million cars by a different calculation using EPA estimates. The Aliso gas leak carbon footprint is referred to as "larger than the Deepwater Horizon leak in the Gulf of Mexico". This single event had a 100-year global warming potential of about 1.5% of the entire annual SoCAB methane and carbon dioxide emissions.

Steve Conley, an atmospheric scientist at UC Davis and owner of Scientific Aviation, independently measured the gas emissions. He sampled the air by flying over the site in his single-engine airplane equipped with an analyzer, which is one of only 3 or 4 of such planes in the country. He said the Aliso Canyon flights were "the hardest [...] I've ever done" because of the headache-inducing smell and sickening turbulence. He doubted the readings initially, and "thought [the instruments] had stopped working because I'd never seen measurement that large before." He had coincidentally been contracted by the California Energy Commission prior to the gas leak, and said that if he had not been contracted and ready to go, "no one would have known how big [the leak] was."

Methane emissions from the Aliso Canyon gas leak were detected by the TCCON site at Caltech within a day of the start of the leak, but researchers at Caltech did not have an explanation for what was causing something "really weird" over Pasadena until later. TCCON's monitoring data were used in analyses of the leak to estimate ethane emissions of 7,700 ± 1,700 tonnes using Steve Conley's methane estimate of 97,100 tonnes.

Besides methane, the gas leak contained tert-butyl mercaptan, tetrahydrothiophene, and methyl mercaptan, which gives the gas a rotten-egg smell. These odorants have been used for decades and were considered harmless although they can cause nausea and vomiting. In addition, the gas contains some carcinogenic benzene. The pollutants may have long-term consequences far beyond the region.

=== Effect on the local community ===
Local residents have reported headaches, nausea, skin rashes, and severe nosebleeds. About 50 children per day saw school nurses for severe nosebleeds. There have been more than usual eye, ear and throat infections. By December 25, 2015, more than 2,200 families from the Porter Ranch neighborhood had been temporarily relocated, and more than 2,500 households were still being processed. As of January 7, 2016, 2,824 households or about 11,300 people had been temporarily relocated by SoCal Gas, while more than 6,500 families have filed for help. Two schools were relocated in January. SoCalGas opened a community resource center at Porter Ranch Town Center and provides weekly customer bulletins by mail and email, as well as calls and text notification for significant events, and has established a community advisory committee.

The community of Eight Mile, Alabama, had a spill of the natural gas odorant in their community in 2008. Residents continue [when?] to experience these symptoms under their long-term exposure to mercaptan. The residents say they got very little of the assistance provided to Porter Ranch residents. Methyl mercaptan is toxic if inhaled according to its MSDS sheet. It is considered fairly harmless by government and industry officials. Whether it is the source of the illnesses in Porter Ranch and Eight Mile has been a subject of debate.

== Closure of well ==
By the end of November 2015, SoCal Gas had attempted six well kill procedures to stop the gas flow by pumping a mixture of mud and brine down the well, the last being on November 25. The attempts failed because of ice formation and a high upward pressure averaging 2,700 pounds per square inch (190 bar).

On December 4, 2015, SoCal Gas started drilling a relief well to the caprock, 8,000 feet (2,400 m) down, with the help of Boots & Coots, a subsidiary of Halliburton. The relief well is "similar to the relief well BP's engineers drilled to stop oil flowing into the Gulf of Mexico in 2010 after the Deepwater Horizon disaster". The plan was to pump liquid and cement into the main well once the relief well could vent the gas safely. SoCal Gas estimated the first relief well would be completed by February 24, 2016. SoCal Gas planned to drill a secondary relief well, estimating the leak repair to take until the end of March 2016.

After the seventh effort to plug the leak with slurry starting December 22 had created a 25-feet-deep crater around the wellhead, the danger of a blowout increased. The well needed to be stabilized with tension cables and further attempts to plug the well from above were halted. State regulators became more concerned about the wellhead's stability.

In January, SoCal Gas sought permission to capture the natural gas and possibly incinerate it, but state regulators voted against it, worried about safety.

On February 11, 2016, the relief well intercepted the base of the leaking well and the company began pumping heavy fluids to control the flow of gas out of the leaking well. On February 18, 2016, state officials announced that the leak was permanently plugged.

== Criticism ==
Steve Conley, the atmospheric scientist that has been measuring the leak's gas emissions, has stated that there was no rapid response plan for this kind of event: "We do not have anything in place to measure giant leaks like this, or to watch them to solve issues." He suggested that contracts needed to be ready so that, "as soon as a leak is spotted you are given a go order and two hours later you're measuring a leak."

Mitchell Englander, the Los Angeles City Councilman representing Porter Ranch, criticized SoCal Gas "operating a facility of this magnitude, [...] feeding 20 million addresses" for not having a backup plan, the delay in bringing necessary equipment on site "from the Gulf states like they did in this particular situation" and the delay in catching the brine, oil and chemical mist landing on people's homes and blackening their cars.

The Center for Biological Diversity criticized Governor Brown's slow response "because state regulators' hands-off approach to underground injection helped set the stage for this catastrophe." The center also said, "The state has known for years that aging natural gas infrastructure was a disaster waiting to happen, but officials mostly ignored those risks."

Experts in petroleum engineering criticized the delay for not drilling a relief well until six weeks after the leak was known, and for drilling only one relief well instead of two.

The Associated Press reported that SoCal Gas had been under-reporting the levels of benzene in the air surrounding the well.

== Regulatory reactions ==
Within two days of discovery, "a dozen or more local and state agencies were involved". The California Air Resources Board measured methane on the ground near the well, from towers, satellites and airplanes, communicating results to the California Energy Commission and SoCal Gas. The Board asked SoCal Gas eighteen very detailed questions about the natural gas, basic leakage rate and leak dynamics. The Federal Aviation Administration established a temporary flight restriction over the leak site until March 2016. On December 7, 2015, Los Angeles City Attorney Mike Feuer sued SoCal Gas over its handling of the well failure. On December 15, 2015, the County of Los Angeles declared a state of emergency.

Feuer's Office went to court again on December 23, 2015, and secured a judicially enforceable agreement with SoCal Gas for the company to speed up relocation efforts of residents affected by the massive leak.

Local residents called upon Governor Jerry Brown to intercede. Kathleen Brown, his sister, is on the board of Sempra Energy, which owns Southern California Gas. The Governor visited the site and the neighborhood on January 4, 2016, and declared a state of emergency on January 6, 2016. He issued stepped-up inspections and safety measures for all natural gas storage facilities in California; further injections at Aliso Canyon had already been prohibited.

Local health officials indicated that long-term exposure to certain trace chemicals could lead to health problems.

In January 2016, two California senators asked the heads of the US Department of Justice and US Department of Transportation and the Environmental Protection Agency for a "legal analysis of any federal authorities that could apply to this incident and storage fields in general" and a "technical analysis of whether Southern California Gas Company could more quickly reduce the gas stored in the facility." On January 11, four California State senators introduced bills to enact an immediate moratorium on any new injections of natural gas and the use of vintage wells (SB 875), to ensure that SoCal Gas will pay housing, relocation and emergency response costs and prohibit the California Public Utilities Commission (CPUC) from allocating those costs to ratepayers, and that it will pay the costs to mitigate the greenhouse gas emissions from its utility profits (SB 876). SB 887 would require all 14 underground natural gas storage facilities to be inspected within the next 12 months and at least annually thereafter; it would also require enhanced safety standards, such as the installation of subsurface safety valves, using new leak-detection technology and development of rigorous response plans.

The unavailability of the Aliso Canyon gas storage facility caused insufficient delivery of gas to power plants, leading to a strained electricity grid. The CPUC ordered Southern California Edison to install a 20 MW (80 MWh) lithium ion battery storage capacity at the utility's Mira Loma substation near San Bernardino, California, to mitigate power failures during winter.

== Political reaction ==
On March 31, 2016 The New York Times published a magazine feature article about the leak called "The Invisible Catastrophe", noting that in an election year, a "menacing disaster that causes mass vomiting and mass nosebleeds in a wealthy, vote-rich community ... is a candidate's dream." While crediting Governor Jerry Brown as the "only politician who has failed to use the gas leak for political gain," it noted freshman Congressman Steve Knight's acceptance of campaign contributions from SoCal Gas' parent company Sempra Energy, and his continued defense of the company into December when he said they were "working on this as diligently as they can." While Knight later called for congressional hearings on the matter, one of his opponents, Democrat Bryan Caforio, quickly seized on the environmental disaster as a central issue of the 25th Congressional race, which according to the Times article "promise[d] to be one of few closely contested races in the House."

Los Angeles Times wrote that no politician is "pursuing the issue as hard as Caforio," who on January 6, 2016, spoke to a group of disgruntled Porter Ranch residents who attended a meeting co-hosted by environmental activist Erin Brockovich. Caforio "aggressively attacked" his opponent, Steve Knight, for his delayed response to the leak. While Knight stated he did not want to politicize the disaster, fellow Republican Michael Antonovich, a Los Angeles County supervisor who has voted consistently against regulation efforts, was outspoken about his determination to hold SoCal Gas responsible.

== Aftermath ==
Elected officials, including Congressman Brad Sherman and Senator Henry Stern, took the position that no decision about whether to reactivate the facility should be made until the health study and an ongoing search for the leak's cause were complete. SoCal Gas had been repeatedly asking California regulators for permission to resume pumping pressurized natural gas into the ground in Porter Ranch, northeast of Los Angeles, at the depleted oil field, which has continued to be used for storage. Records show the utility was negotiating this step with regulators for several weeks. Since the multiple investigations into the cause of the leak have not been completed, Sherman insisted that the process of reopening the storage facility must proceed with extreme caution. Aliso Canyon is not deemed ready to resume normal operations by regulators or chief politicians that are involved with the oversight of the securing and cleanup of the leak. Sherman urged that the gas company be restricted to minimal operations required to prevent power interruptions. The storage field is a primary supplier to gas-powered electric plants. The gas leak has been cited by experts and independent researchers as the largest in U.S. history.

== Legal consequences ==
On November 23, 2015, some residents who had been displaced by the leaking gases filed a lawsuit in Los Angeles Superior Court to require that SoCal Gas disclose information related to the health risks of the gases released. The plaintiffs also had continued to seek damages.

In January, it was thought that residents might have filed as many as one thousand lawsuits. On February 2, 2016, Los Angeles County filed criminal charges against SoCal Gas for its failure to report the leak immediately. The charges include three counts of failing to immediately report the leak following its detection on October 23, 2015, and one count of "discharging air contaminants" beginning the same day.

On September 13, 2016, The Los Angeles Times reported that SoCal Gas reached a plea agreement with the Los Angeles County prosecutor's office. Under the agreement, SoCal Gas pleaded no contest to one misdemeanor count of failing to immediately report the October 2015 leak and was ordered to pay a $4 million fine. The resulting settlement between the local Los Angeles prosecutor's office and SoCal Gas executives had ended in a mere misdemeanor charge, the lowest possible charge, which can be expunged. In addition to the negotiated plea deal, SoCal Gas had paid a penalty fine of a relatively small $4 million U.S. dollars, the equivalent of the amount of revenue that SoCal Gas received in profits in less than most average 12 hour time periods during the fiscal year of 2015. The Porter Ranch Gas Leak has been cited often by experts and independent tests as the largest gas leak in U.S. History.

In 2018, SoCal Gas agreed to payments of $119.5 million to several government entities over the incident.

== See also ==
- Aliso Creek (Los Angeles County)
- Exide lead contamination in southeast Los Angeles County
- Four Corners Methane Hot Spot
- Santa Susana Mountains topics
