= Steven Kunes =

American screenwriter (born 1956)

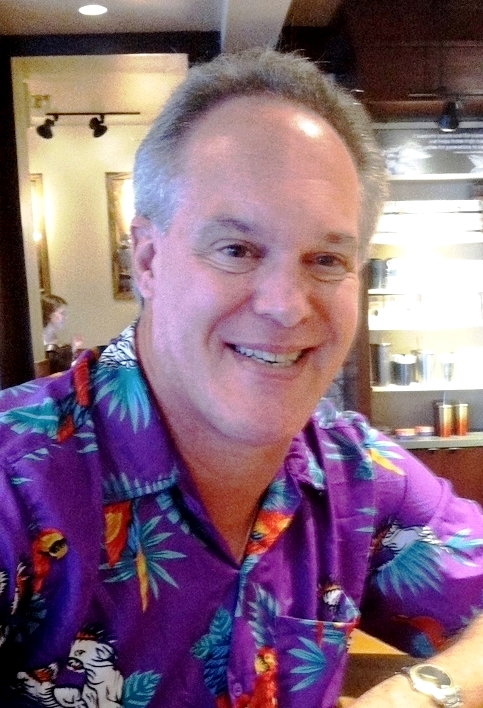
- Born: 1956 (age 69–70); Bucks County, Pennsylvania, U.S.

Steven Kunes (born 1956) is an American screenwriter who was convicted of felony commercial burglary and grand theft by false pretenses.

== Early life and education ==
Kunes was born in 1956 in Bucks County, Pennsylvania. He graduated in 1974 from Neshaminy High School and graduated from New York University in 1978 with Bachelor of Arts degrees in Creative Writing and Comparative Literature.

== Career ==
With Norman Lear, Kunes co-wrote a pilot TV episode for NBC in August 1984 called P.O.P. about a "lovable con artist" and he was a writer on two single-season sitcoms, a.k.a. Pablo in 1984 on ABC and Marblehead Manor in 1987-88.

Kunes sold the screenplay First Comes Love for $1.2 million in 1992, though no film was made.

Kunes is a member of the Writers Guild of America, West, the Authors Guild, the Dramatists Guild, and PEN America.

== Legal issues ==
In 1982, Kunes attempted to sell to People magazine an interview with reclusive author J. D. Salinger, whom he claimed he had met. Salinger sued and settled the case under the conditions that Kunes was "permanently enjoined [i.e., legally forbidden] from representing by any means that he is associated with Salinger", barred from "exhibiting, transmitting or exhibiting documents, writing or statements attributed to Salinger" and "required to collect and turn over any such documents or writings for destruction". The interview was never published. He later succeeded in selling a fake interview with Jimmy Buffett to the Santa Barbara Daily Sound.

Kunes was arrested on March 17, 2011, for purportedly swindling his friend, former Café Buenos Aires owner Wally Ronchietto, out of $2,000 for a nonexistent movie deal. On April 23, 2011, Noozhawk, a Santa Barbara online publication, announced that it had removed six of Kunes's articles from its digital archives as two contained plagiarized passages.

On August 27, 2011, a Santa Barbara judge issued a $200,000 bench warrant for his arrest when he failed to appear in court. Thought to have been hiding in Bucks County, he was apprehended in New Jersey less than a month later. At court, Kunes pleaded guilty and admitted to forging checks. On May 4, 2012, he was sentenced to five years in jail for felony commercial burglary and grand theft by false pretenses. One year of his sentence was later removed after restitution was made to his victims.

In February 2013, Kunes was re-arrested. He had been serving his five-year sentence and had been approved for electronic monitoring on August 1, 2012. Kunes removed the device on August 22, 2012, and mailed the device back to the Santa Barbara County Sheriff's Office. A photo posted on the Sheriff's Office Facebook page led to his identification at a Carpinteria cafe and his subsequent arrest. He was released from prison in June 2015 but arrested again for violating the terms of his probation after falsely telling the Bucks County Courier Times that he was producing a Netflix series called Over My Dead Body.

== Bibliography ==
- Four on the Four: Four Plays (ISBN 978-1983481444)
- Uncle Jerry to Win (a novel) (ISBN 978-1985717411)
- Pick Six: Six Screenplays (ISBN 978-1717594587)
