= History of Santa Barbara, California =

The history of Santa Barbara, California, begins approximately 13,000 years ago with the arrival of the first Native Americans. The Spanish came in the 18th century to occupy and Christianize the area, which became part of Mexico following the Mexican War of Independence. In 1848, the expanding United States acquired the town along with the rest of California as a result of defeating Mexico in the Mexican–American War. Santa Barbara transformed then from a small cluster of adobes into successively a rowdy, lawless Gold Rush era town; a Victorian-era health resort; a center of silent film production; an oil boom town; a town supporting a military base and hospital during World War II; and finally it became the economically diverse resort destination it remains in the present day. Twice destroyed by earthquakes, in 1812 and 1925, it was rebuilt after the second one in a Spanish Colonial style.

== Pre-contact history ==
The lands flanking the Santa Barbara Channel, both the mainland including present day Santa Barbara, and the Channel Islands, has been continuously inhabited by the Chumash people and their ancestors for at least 13,000 years. The oldest human skeleton yet found in North America, Arlington Springs Man, was unearthed on Santa Rosa Island, approximately 30 miles (48 km) from downtown Santa Barbara.

In more recent pre-Columbian times the Chumash had many villages along the shores and inland, at least one of which, on present-day Mescalitan Island, had over a thousand inhabitants in the 16th century. They were peaceful hunter-gatherers, living from the region's abundant natural resources, and navigating the ocean in tomols, craft closely related to those used by Polynesians. Their rock art work can be seen in nearby Chumash Painted Cave, and their sophisticated basket weaving at the Santa Barbara Museum of Natural History. The Santa Barbara bands spoke the Barbareño language dialect of the Chumashan languages group. As Europeans settled in their homelands the Chumash population declined.

== Spanish period ==
=== First encounters and Portola expedition ===
The first Europeans to see the area were members of a Spanish expedition led by the Portuguese explorer Juan Rodríguez Cabrillo, who sailed through the Channel in 1542, and anchored briefly in the vicinity of Goleta. Later, on the return voyage, Cabrillo injured his leg during a fight with natives on Santa Catalina Island and died from gangrene. He was buried either on San Miguel Island or Mescalitan Island – the exact burial place of Cabrillo has long been a mystery.

In 1602, Spanish maritime explorer Sebastián Vizcaíno gave the name "Santa Barbara" to the channel and also to one of the Channel Islands in gratitude for having survived a violent storm in the Channel on December 3, the eve of the feast day of that saint.

A land expedition led by Gaspar de Portolà passed through in 1769, and spent the night of August 18 in the area of today's lower Laguna Street, where at that time there was a freshwater pond (Spanish: laguna). There was a large native town nearby, which Franciscan missionary Juan Crespi, who accompanied the expedition, named "Laguna de la Concepcion". Vizcaíno's earlier name, however, is the one that has survived. The next night, August 19, the expedition moved a short way to a camp by a creek, probably Mission Creek, but not as far up as where the mission was later established.

Portola's expedition encountered large numbers of exceptionally friendly natives, many of whom lived in Syuxtun, a village just in back of the beach between present-day Chapala and Bath streets. Indeed, the natives – which the Spaniards dubbed the Canaliños for the "canoes" (actually tomols) they used so skillfully – so irritated their guests with gifts and boisterous music that Portola changed the location of his camp on August 19 so the party could get some rest. On Sunday, August 20, they held the first Catholic mass in Santa Barbara history, at Arroyo Burro near Veronica Springs.

The Portolá expedition was the beginning of Spanish efforts to occupy Alta California and fortify it against perceived threats from other encroaching European colonial powers – principally the early British Empire and tsarist Russian-Pacific Empire. In addition, missions established by Franciscans under Junípero Serra were intended to convert the natives to Christianity and turn them into loyal Spanish colonists.

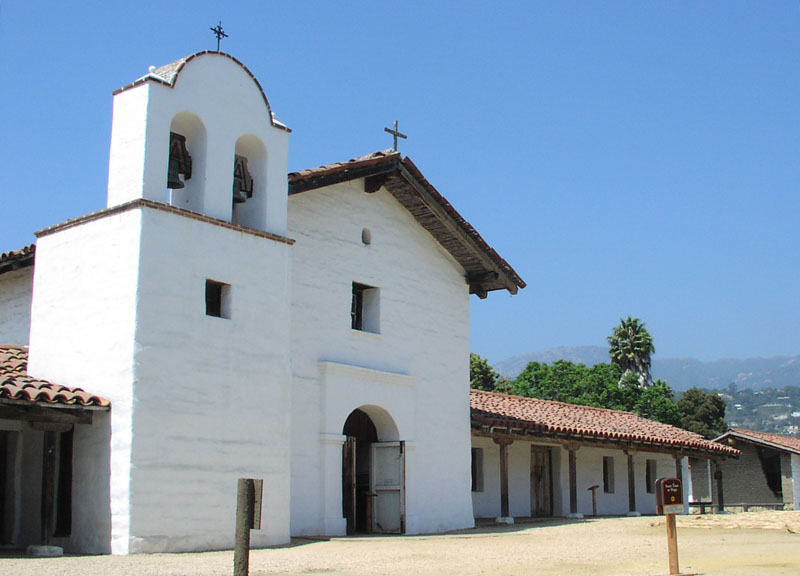
Santa Barbara Presidio in 2005. Begun in 1782, The Presidio was the last military outpost built by Spain anywhere in the Western Hemisphere.

=== Presidio, Mission, Cieneguitas chapel, and 1812 earthquake ===
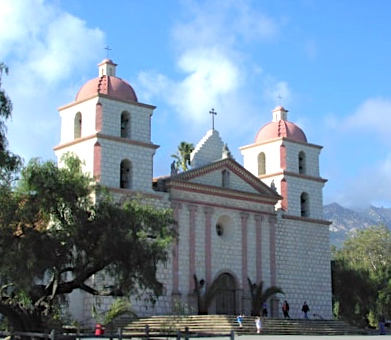
Mission Santa Barbara as it was in 2005. It was rebuilt after the 1812 earthquake, and the towers were repaired again after the 1925 earthquake.

Portola himself, however, did not stay, and it was not until 1782 that a force of soldiers, led by Don Felipe de Neve came to build the Presidio of Santa Barbara, one of several military outposts meant to protect Alta California against foreign interests and to protect the missions against attacks by hostile natives. The Presidio was not completed until 1792, and Father Fermín Lasuén dedicated the nearby Mission Santa Barbara on the feast day of Santa Barbara (December 4, 1786). He chose for his building site the location of a Chumash village on Mission Creek named Tay-nay-án.

Many of the soldiers who came to build and garrison the Presidio had brought their families with them, and after their terms of service ended settled in Santa Barbara. They built their adobes near the Presidio, arranged haphazardly; a Boston journalist described the scatter of these buildings "as though fired from a blunderbuss." Most of Santa Barbara's old families are descended from these early settlers, and many of their names linger in the street and place names, such as Cota, De la Guerra, Gutierriez, Carrillo, and Ortega. Among these early settlers was José Francisco Ortega, who was an important figure in the Portola expedition and became the recipient of the only Spanish-era land grant in Santa Barbara County, Rancho Nuestra Señora del Refugio, in 1794. This rancho would be the namesake for modern Refugio State Beach, and Ortega would be remembered as the capitán (captain) in the name of El Capitán State Beach on the Gaviota Coast

In 1793, Captain George Vancouver, the British explorer who was circumnavigating the globe on the Vancouver Expedition, anchored HMS Discovery off West Beach and received permission for his seacook to chop stovewood from the Mesa oak groves, and refill his water tanks from a seep at the base of the Mesa bluffs near Pershing Park.

Building the Mission itself continued throughout the rest of the century, along with the work of converting the Indians to Christianity, a task which proved difficult: according to the Mission registers, by 1805, only 185 of the more than 500 Indians in Santa Barbara had been baptized. The burial register shows that 3,997 Indians died between 1787 and 1841, the majority from diseases such as smallpox, to which the natives had no natural immunity. By 1803 the Mission's chapel was finished, and by 1807 a complete village for the Indians had been completed, largely by their own labor. The site of this village is on the Mission grounds along modern-day Constance Street.

The Spaniards also built a chapel to the west of the Mission, in an effort to Christianize a group of Indians that lived in the Cieneguitas (swamps) area between Modoc Road and the El Sueno tract who refused to be moved to the Mission compound. Known as the Cieneguitas chapel, it took the form of an adobe asistencia complete with a tile roof and two bells donated by the King of Spain, and stood from 1803 until the 1890s on a ridge opposite Cuna Drive at what is now 4308 Modoc Road, at the northern edge of Hope Ranch. When the first adobe mission was wrecked by the 1812 earthquake, this chapel was the only house of worship left to the friars.

On December 21, 1812, one of the largest earthquakes in California history completely destroyed the first Mission along with most of Santa Barbara. With an estimated magnitude of 7.2, and a hypothesized epicenter near Santa Cruz Island, the quake also produced a tsunami which carried water all the way to modern-day Anapamu Street, and carried a ship a half-mile up Refugio Canyon. Following the devastating earthquake, the Mission padres decided to build a larger and more elaborate Mission complex, which is the one that survives to the present day. The Franciscans began a search for material in 1815, obtaining limestone from a cantera (quarry) at 1450 Cantera Avenue in present-day Hope Ranch, mixing it with seashells, and baking it in a brick calera (kiln), the ruins of which lie at the foot of the slope south of 1161 Las Palmas Drive. While the church was ready in 1820, the bell towers were not finished until 1833.

=== Bouchard raids ===
The most serious military threat to Santa Barbara during the Spanish period was not by a colonial power, but by Hippolyte Bouchard, a French privateer working for the Argentine government, which was, along with Mexico, attempting to throw off Spanish rule. Bouchard, who was given the task of destroying as many Spanish assets as possible, and in particular the ports in the Americas, possessed two well-armed frigates, which had sufficient armament and crews to destroy any lightly defended towns they encountered. He had done exactly that to Monterey, the capital of Alta California, shortly before coming to Santa Barbara.

Bouchard's raiders landed first at Refugio Canyon on December 5, 1818, where they pillaged and burned the ranch belonging to the Ortega family, killing cattle and slitting the throats of horses. However, after being alerted by messengers from Monterey, the Presidio dispatched a squadron of cavalry, who caught three stragglers from the ill-disciplined raiding party and dragged them back to Santa Barbara in chains. Bouchard sailed the remaining twenty miles (32 km) to Santa Barbara a few days later, anchoring off of present-day Milpas Street, and threatened to shell the town unless his men were returned to him. José de la Guerra y Noriega, the comandante of the Presidio, granted his request, but Bouchard did not realize that he had been tricked. The town was not as heavily defended as it had seemed to be; the hundreds of cavalrymen Bouchard had seen through his spyglass were but the same few dozen riding in large circles, stopping and changing costumes each time they passed behind a patch of heavy brush. Although Bouchard had recently destroyed Monterey, he departed without attacking the town.

When Santa Barbara faced Bouchard's attack, the mission friars, on orders from Governor Pablo Vicente de Solá, used San Marcos Pass as an escape hatch through which they sent the church treasures and evacuated the pueblo's women and children to the asylum of Mission Santa Inés in present-day Solvang.

The incident frightened De la Guerra so much that he petitioned the viceroy to rush military reinforcements to bolster the defense of Santa Barbara. The so-called "Mazatlan Volunteers", 45 calvalrymen led by a man named Narciso Fabrigat, were assigned to De la Guerra's garrison. Fabrigat became a civilian when Mexico overthrew Spanish rule in 1822, and in 1843, he was awarded the 3,232 acres of Rancho La Calera by the Mexican governor Manuel Micheltorena. When the street grid was created, Voluntario Street was named after his group of volunteers.

A more lasting effect of Bouchard's California raid was the arrival of Joseph John Chapman, an American sailor who had been a member of Bouchard's crew but was left behind (either at Monterey or at Refugio) to become the first US-born permanent resident of Spanish California. Many years later, Chapman (who had married an Ortega daughter) also became the first US-born permanent resident of Santa Barbara.

== Mexican period ==
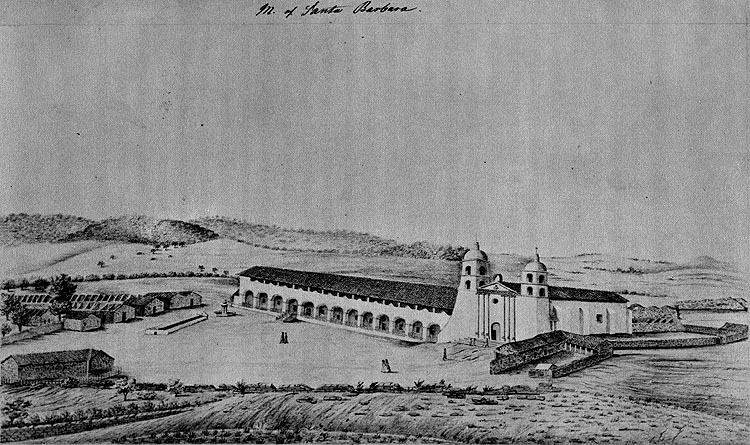
Mission Santa Barbara in 1856; view from the northeast, with the hills of Hope Ranch, California to the left.

=== Indian rebellion ===
In 1822 the Spanish rule ended and their flag came down forever, with their loss in the Mexican War of Independence. Santa Barbara, along with the rest of Alta California, became a territory of independent Mexico. One of the earliest notable events in the Mexican period in Santa Barbara was the February 1824 Indian rebellion. The Indians especially resented the poor and scapegoating treatment given them by the soldiers stationed at the Presidio, who were resentful of being unpaid by the new government. The rebellion, incited by the more warlike Yokut—Tulares, inland relations of the Chumash, began at Mission Santa Inés, near present-day Solvang on the other side of the Santa Ynez Mountains, and quickly spread to Mission La Purísima Concepción. In Santa Barbara, the Indians seized control of the buildings of the Mission complex, but immediately the buildings were surrounded by Presidio soldiers, since the Presidio was little more than a mile away. Overnight the Indians were able to make a getaway north into Mission Canyon and then over the mountains, where they eventually linked up with other unsubdued groups of Native Americans in the southern San Joaquin Valley. After a battle near San Emigdio Creek in March, and a subsequent three-month pursuit and negotiation, the Indians were recaptured near Buena Vista Lake, and brought back to Santa Barbara.

=== Civilian government and rancho land grants ===
During the Mexican period, civilian government replaced military and mission control for the first time. An alcalde (roughly equivalent to a "strong" mayor) was appointed, supplemented by other civilian officials. The Mexican government opened Alta California to trade with the United States, Great Britain and other foreign countries, and exports became important to the local economy. Principal export commodities were tallow and hides, both of which were carried by California clippers to Boston to the candle- and shoe-making factories in New England, in return for goods purchased by the locals. One of the most famous English-language descriptions of Santa Barbara from this period is by Richard Henry Dana Jr., who wrote of the town as a desolate place, at the ends of the earth, in Two Years Before the Mast:

...the large bay without a vessel in it; the surf roaring and rolling in upon the beach; the white mission; the dark town and the high, treeless mountains ... We lay at a distance of three miles (4.8 km) from the beach, and the town was nearly a mile farther; so that we saw little or nothing of it. Occasionally we landed a few goods, which were taken away by the Indians in large, clumsy ox-carts, with the yoke on the ox's neck instead of under it, and with small solid wheels. A few hides were brought down, which we carried off in the California style.

By 1833 the process of secularization at the Missions was completed, and the lands and property were given to soldiers, leading Californios, and occasionally the original Native American owners, with most of the Indians becoming Mexican citizens. This had a dramatic effect on the economy and culture, commencing what is called the Rancho Period in California history, a period which overlapped the end of the Mexican era. Lands formerly owned by the Church were parceled out in land grants to applicants; the Mexican governors of California awarded over 800 separate land grants before the end of Mexican control in 1847. Many local place names derive from these grants, including Dos Pueblos, San Marcos, Refugio (the only Spanish-era land grant in Santa Barbara County), Las Positas, and Goleta.

One of the ranches, Rancho La Calera, named after the mission limekiln, was granted by governor Manuel Micheltorena in 1843 to Narciso Fabrigat, the former leader of the Mazatlan volunteers sent after the Bouchard raid. It included a freshwater lake which the Chumash called Chaco, or "lake without a mouth", but which the Spaniards called Laguna Blanca, the White Lake. In 1846, Governor Pio Pico granted the Yankee captain Thomas R. Robbins a contiguous parcel of equal size, extending as far eastward as Arroyo Burro, which was labeled Rancho Las Positas after the small ponds around Veronica Springs (now Arroyo Burro Open Space). Robbins was later also granted Catalina Island, and Robbins Street in Westside Santa Barbara was named after him when the street grid was created. Fabrigat was murdered by a robber in 1848 during a rash of outlawry caused by the Gold Rush, and Robbins and his wife Encarnacion Carrillo of the Carrillo family, bought Rancho Las Positas from him to form the combined Rancho Las Positas y La Calera, which encompasses the present-day Hope Ranch, Hidden Valley, and Campanil neighborhoods.

Cattle ranching rapidly expanded, becoming the predominant land use; horsemanship and cattle ownership became the symbols of status, and the society developed quasi-feudal characteristics, in which the largest ranches were almost entirely self-sufficient. The Chumash who previously had served the padres in the Mission system became laborers on the ranches, occupying the lowest rung of the social ladder, with the oldest established families – the Ortegas, De la Guerras, and others – at the top. During this period the town of Santa Barbara grew into a modest, and informally organized collection of structures around the central Presidio. A few of these buildings – such as the Covarrubias Adobe, on the grounds of the Santa Barbara Historical Society on Santa Barbara Street, which was briefly the location of the capitol of California during the Mexican War – survive to the present day. By the mid-1840s the Mexican period, the population of Santa Barbara had reached approximately 2,500.

=== Mexican–American War ===
The end of the Mexican period came quickly for Santa Barbara, but without bloodshed, during the United States' conquest of California in the Mexican–American War, which had broken out in May 1846 over the annexation of Texas. In August, Commodore Robert F. Stockton anchored a warship in Santa Barbara harbor and deployed a contingent of ten Marines to occupy the town. They proceeded to the Presidio where they ran the Stars and Stripes over the city for the first time; not long afterwards, seeing the town was peaceful, they left, being replaced later by ten cavalrymen from John C. Frémont's army. However, a contingent of a hundred Mexican cavalrymen sent by General José María Flores came and chased them out. The outnumbered cavalrymen, rather than surrender, fled on foot up into Mission Canyon, and fortified a rocky ridge below La Cumbre Peak, resisting the calls to surrender by their pursuers. When the Mexican force set fire to the chaparral, the Americans clambered over the mountain ridge overnight, escaping north and eventually reaching Monterey, where they joined forces again with Frémont.

The culminating event of the Mexican–American War for Santa Barbara was Frémont's return, over the surprise route of San Marcos Pass, which at the time was little more than a trail. On the night of December 24, 1846, during a torrential rainstorm, he led his California Battalion over the mountains. In spite of losing many of his horses, mules, and cannon to the treacherous and muddy slopes – and not a one to enemy fire – he reached the foothills on the other side in the vicinity of present-day Tucker's Grove, spent the next several days regrouping, making camp along Mission Creek between Anapamu and Canon Perdido Streets, and then marched into Santa Barbara to capture the Presidio. He encountered no resistance: all men interested in fighting had left for Los Angeles to join the forces headed by Flores and Andrés Pico which had assembled to defend that city. On January 3 Frémont headed south, skirting the cliffs of the Rincon at low tide (no road existed then), arriving in Los Angeles ten days later. The Treaty of Cahuenga, signed on January 13, 1847, ended the war in California. After the Treaty of Guadalupe Hidalgo, signed a year later, Santa Barbara formally became part of the United States.

== U.S. annexation; Gold Rush; Haley; Civil War ==
=== Gold rush settlers, incorporation, street grid, and newspaper ===
Change came quickly after the end of the war. Gold was found at Sutter's Mill in the Sierra foothills, and hordes of gold-seekers flooded into California from the eastern United States and other places to become rich. Few did, but Santa Barbara began to attract settlers as newcomers discovered the place's charms, including that almost anything planted would grow there. In 1850, California became the 31st state, and immediately after its establishment, both Santa Barbara City and County came into being. By 1850, the area was still sparsely populated, with the census showing only 1,185 people for the entire county, but that number doubled in ten years.

Some of the changes that occurred involved administration, communications, construction, urban layout, and transportation. On April 9, 1850, Santa Barbara incorporated as a city and formed an official town council. The appearance of the town began to change as well. Settlers from the east wanted dwellings made from wood rather than the sensible adobe built by the Spanish and Mexican residents; to build them, they needed to import wood from distant Oregon, as the local oak trees were not suitable for lumber. This was one of several pressures that resulted in the development of the port.

Another consequence of the American takeover was the creation of the street grid, which replaced the previous haphazard jumble of dwellings and irregular paths. Its execution, the disastrously bungled survey of 1851 by Salisbury Haley, is a notorious event in local history. Haley's survey chains were broken in places and held together with oxhide, a material that expanded on damp mornings and contracted in the afternoon sun; since his chains varied in length depending on the time of day he used them, most of his measurements were off, accumulating errors of as much as 45 feet (13.7 m) out of true by the time he had crossed the city. Haley had been ordered to create neat square city blocks exactly 450 feet (137 m) on a side: a subsequent corrective survey established that he had created blocks ranging from 450 to 464 feet (137 to 141 m) on a side. The lot misalignments and street grid problems caused by Haley persist to the present day. Kinks in Mission Street at De La Vina and De La Guerra at Santa Barbara Street are two of the awkward places well known to city commuters, which resulted from Haley's unfortunate measurements. In addition, Haley decided to lay out the street grid at an angle of approximately 48 degrees from north, with State Street approximately midway between the Mesa and the Riviera, paralleling both hills, an orientation that confuses both residents and visitors. Downtown's Haley Street, named after him, is ironically one of the streets that did not need a dog-leg to compensate for his variable-length chain.

Another change that accompanied the transformation of Santa Barbara from a small village to a significant town was the founding of the first newspaper, the Santa Barbara Gazette, in 1855. The newspaper was half in English and half in Spanish since the population, not all of whom were bilingual, was split between the two languages. English gradually supplanted Spanish as the language of daily life. Although minutes of the newly formed City Council were kept in English by 1852, Spanish remained the language used for public records until 1870.

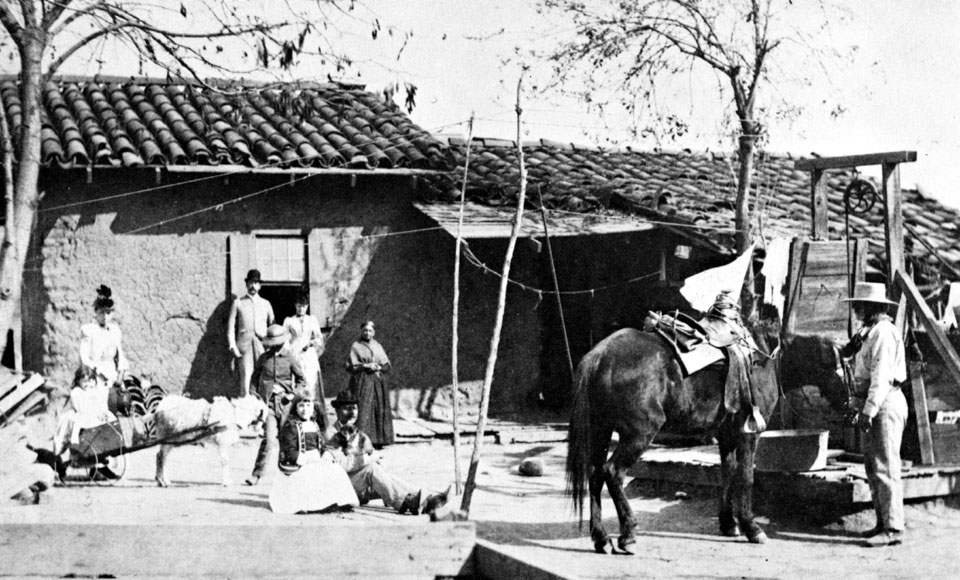
The Presidio fell into disrepair after 1848. This photograph shows a portion of the Santa Barbara Presidio converted to a residence around 1880.

An experiment in bilingual education in the one public school frustrated both the Californios and the Anglos. Tensions were resolved in 1857 when the Catholic set up a parochial school that attracted the Spanish speaking students.

=== Lawlessness, high temperature, and drought ===
The 1850s was a tumultuous and violent period. Life in the town was disrupted by rowdy Americans recently returned from the gold camps in the Sierra foothills, and gangs of toughs and highwaymen. Some of these lawless newcomers targeted the local Spanish population, causing violent racial incidents including lynchings. Outlaws such as Joaquin Murrieta (the Zorro of Hollywood legend, but likely a composite of several different bandits) preyed on travelers on the roadways, and even on citizens in town. The confrontation with the gang led by Jack Powers at the "Battle of Arroyo Burro" in 1853, in which he intimidated and drove away a posse of approximately 200 citizens, was one of the most dramatic incidents of the period. Powers was not thrown out of town until a band of angry and well-armed vigilantes from San Luis Obispo rode to Santa Barbara to get rid of him (he eventually came to a bloody end, murdered and hurled into a den of hungry wild boars in the Mexican state of Sonora). His downfall coincided with the return of law and order after a period in which Santa Barbara was the rowdiest and most dangerous town between Los Angeles and San Francisco.

In 1859, Richard Henry Dana returned, 24 years after his first visit as a 20-year-old sailor, and described the changes in the town:

...and there lies Santa Barbara on its plain, with its amphitheatre of high hills and distant mountains. There is the old white Mission with its belfries, and there the town, with its one-story adobe houses, with here and there a two-story wooden house of later build; yet little it is altered – the same repose in the golden sunlight and glorious climate, sheltered by its hills; and then, more remindful than anything else, there roars and tumbles upon the beach the same grand surf of the great Pacific as on the beautiful day when the Pilgrim, after her five months' voyage, dropped her weary anchors here; the same bright blue ocean, and the surf making just the same monotonous, melancholy roar, and the same dreamy town, and gleaming white Mission, as when we beached our boats for the first time.

In that same year, 1859, Santa Barbara recorded the highest temperature ever noted on the North American continent, 133 °F (56 °C), a record which was to stand until Death Valley topped it by one degree in 1913. The U.S. Coast Survey wrote that birds dropped dead in midair, cattle died in the fields, and fruit dropped, scorched, from trees; the town's inhabitants fled to the safety of their adobe buildings, which insulated them from the freak superheated northwest simoon wind, an event which has not occurred since. In the immediately following years, two other weather events had a significant effect on the course of development in Santa Barbara: catastrophic floods during the winter of 1861–62, during which the Goleta Slough, formerly open to deep-water vessels, completely silted up, becoming the marsh it remains to the present day; and the disastrous drought of 1863, which forever ended the Rancho era as the value of rangeland collapsed, cattle died or were sold off, and the large ranches were broken down and sold in smaller parcels for development.

== Victorian period ==
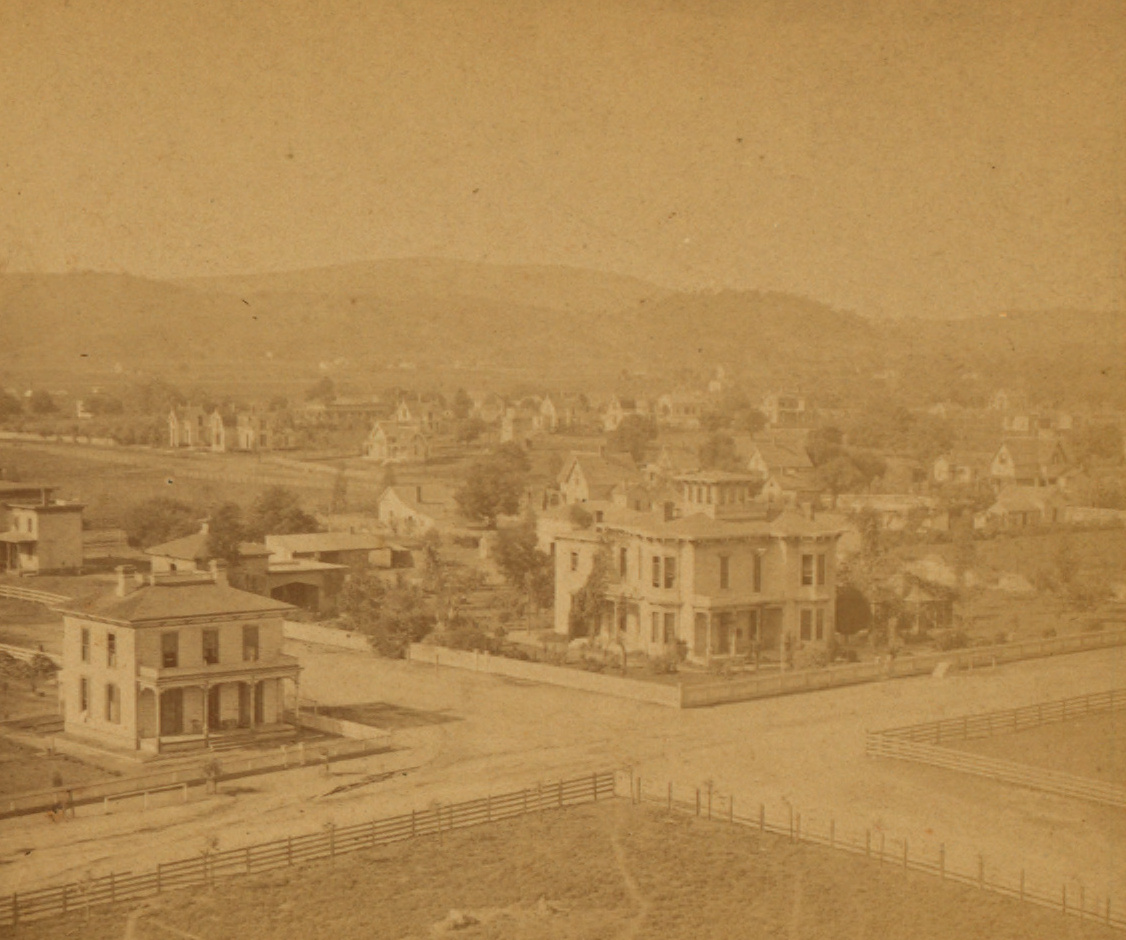
View of Santa Barbara, ca. 1875

The town continued to grow, and slowly ended its isolation after the American Civil War. The war itself had little effect on Santa Barbara. One troop of cavalry organized to join the Union cause, but never saw action against Confederate forces; they served briefly and bloodlessly in Arizona versus Apache raids.

In 1869, the first coeducational preparatory school in southern California, Santa Barbara College, opened at State and Anapamu Streets. Improvements in the harbor included the building of Stearns Wharf in 1872, which increased the commercial capacity of the port; formerly, ships had to anchor several miles offshore, and load and unload their cargoes by rowing small boats to the shore. In that same year, Jose Lobero built an opera house (at the current site of the Lobero Theatre), State Street was paved, and gas lamps were lit downtown.

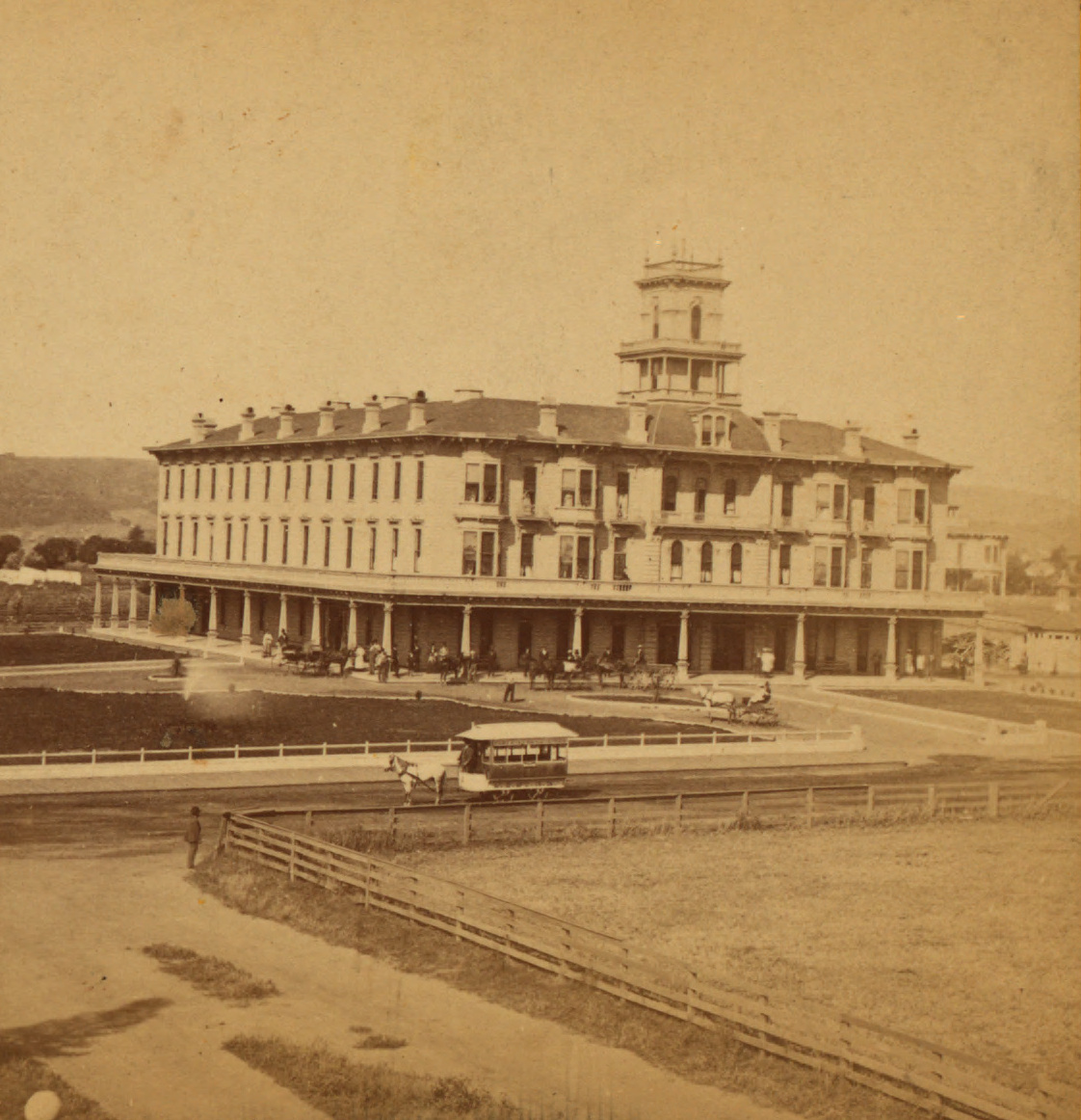
Santa Barbara's Arlington Hotel, c. 1875

Writer Charles Nordhoff, commissioned by Southern Pacific Railroad to write about Santa Barbara to draw easterners to the town, was largely responsible for the boom in the tourism industry that commenced in the 1870s, and which would eventually lead to Santa Barbara becoming a world-famous resort. He praised Santa Barbara as the "pleasantest" spot in California, and particularly delightful for those suffering health ills; his book resulted in steamships full of travelers, many of whom came to stay. The luxurious and instantly famous Arlington Hotel, built in 1874 (and destroyed by fire in 1909), housed many of them.

The isolation of Santa Barbara ended in stages. The building of Stearns Wharf allowed easy access by steamboat; in 1887, the railroad to Los Angeles was completed; and in 1901, the railroad was put through to San Francisco, forming the first version of the Coast Line. Santa Barbara was finally accessible both by land and sea. The day that the first train arrived from San Francisco was also the last day that the stagecoach bumped over dusty San Marcos Pass. These new connections made possible Santa Barbara's development into the resort destination it has remained ever since. Within the city, the first electric streetcar line opened in 1896, as the demand for transportation increased. By 1900, the population had reached 6,587, doubling in twenty years.

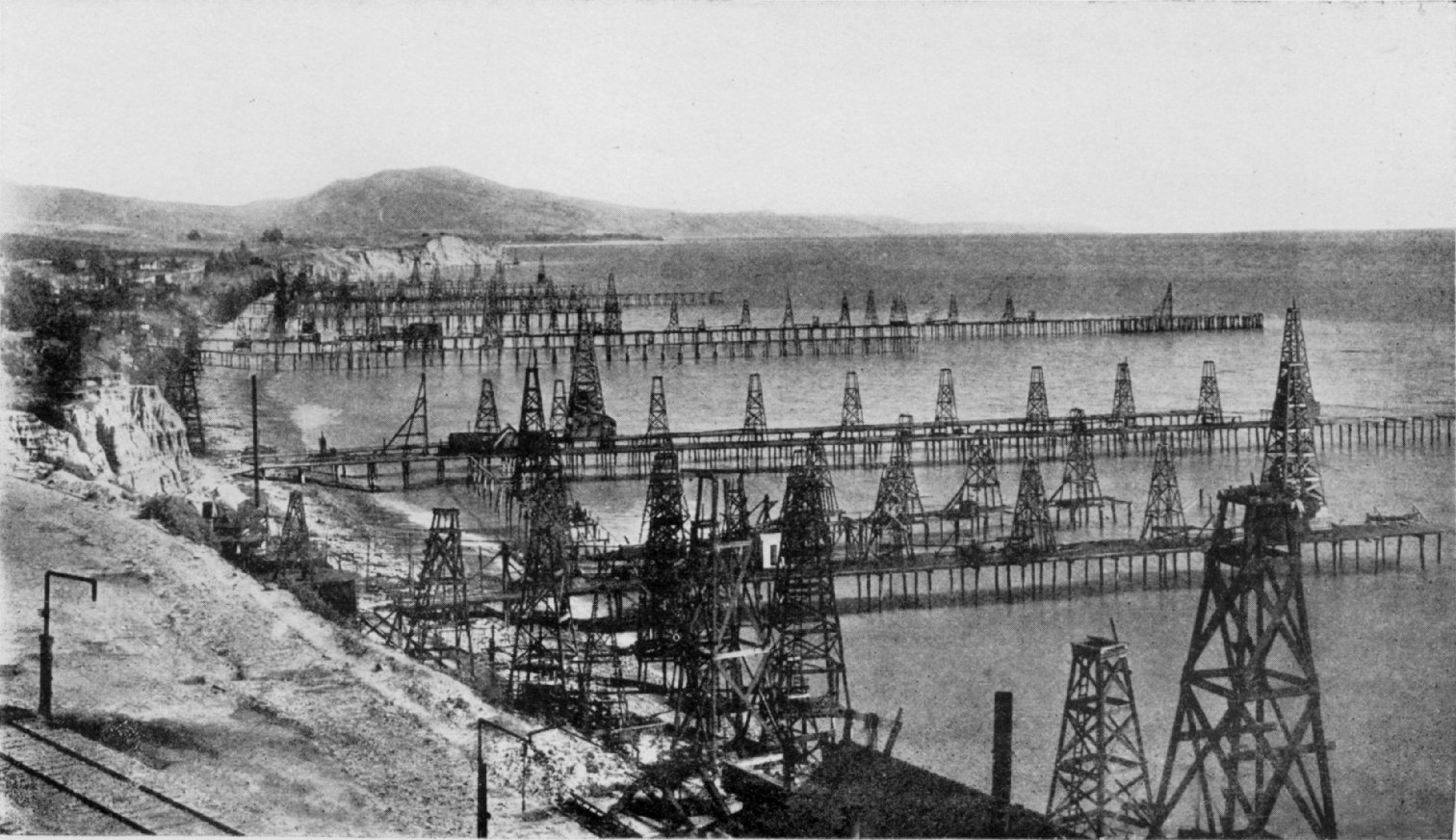
A picture of the Summerland Oil Field, the location of the world's first offshore oil well, c. 1915

The discovery of oil changed the local economy as well as the landscape. While the black gooey stuff had long been known from natural oil seeps, and was used as a roof sealant during the building of the Mission, its value as a fuel did not become widely known until the late 19th century. In the 1890s, the large Summerland Oil Field was found and began to be developed. Summerland was the site of the world's first offshore oil well. While most of the oil had been pumped out by 1910, derricks remained on the beach in Summerland into the 1920s, and the field remained partially productive until 1940.

=== Hope Ranch ===
Meanwhile, further west, Thomas Robbins, who owned Rancho Las Positas y La Calera, died in 1860, and his widow was incapable of managing the 6,000 acre ranch. Seizing the opportunity, a man named Thomas W. Hope borrowed $8,000 from fellow Irishman Nicolas A. Den, owner of Rancho Dos Pueblos west of the Goleta Valley, and in 1861 purchased the entire Las Positas y Calera rancho from Señora Robbins. It was henceforth known as Hope Ranch. Hope had emigrated as a teenage boy from County Meath, Ireland, to become a cowboy in Texas at the time of the massacre at the Alamo. Moving westward by wagon train at age 29, Hope passed through Santa Barbara on his way to San Francisco, where he married Delia Fox. They operated a rooming house to get a stake with which they bought 2,000 sheep, which Hope drove down to Santa Barbara to graze on land leased from the Cieneguitas natives. He and Delia lived in an adobe believed to have been located near today's Vieja Valley school.

Wool prices skyrocketed during the Civil War, which made Hope a rich man. But he had his problems: stagecoaches bound for Gaviota Pass crossed his property daily, and farm wagons and other public traffic followed in the stage ruts, giving Hope reason to fear that continued public usage might lead to the condemnation of a right of way across his property. To prevent this, Hope stationed his Native American foreman, the giant Juan Justo, to barricade the road and turn all traffic out of Hope Ranch. In 1873, the county surveyor J. L. Barker began staking out a road along this path, and Hope clouted him over the skull with a fence rail, which cost him a $1,000 fine for assault and battery. Because of Justo's role in the controversy and because the Modoc War was raging in the lavabeds of the Oregon border that summer, locals began referring to the disputed thoroughfare as "the Modoc Road", giving it the name it bears to this day.

Later, Hope donated a 100-foot-wide highway from his ranch to the intersection of Turnpike Road, which evolved into modern Hollister Avenue as far west as Ellwood Canyon. Hope also deeded a pie-shaped piece of land, east of today's Juvenile Hall, for use as a Catholic cemetery. Most of the burials were transferred to Calvary Cemetery on Hope Avenue starting in 1912, but the Catholic Diocese of Los Angeles still owns Hope's donated land.

Thomas Hope never learned to read or write, but he lived affluently. The first flat racing course in California for trotters and pacers was laid out by him near Laguna Blanca, and the first hurdle racing in the State took place on a course encircling the lake. Here Hope raced Honest John, Harry Lazarus, and Selin, three of the most celebrated racehorses of their time. In 1875, Hope commissioned Santa Barbara's premier architect, Peter J. Barber, to build a $10,000 Victorian home at what is now 399 Nogal Drive. It is constructed of heart of redwood lumber, impossible to obtain today, and was listed on the National Register of Historic Places in 1978.

Hope died unexpectedly before the mansion was finished, on January 11, 1876, of a digestive disorder variously diagnosed as food poisoning or stomach cancer. He bequeathed the western half of his property to his widow; the eastern half, extending to Arroyo Burro Beach, was divided equally among Hope's surviving children: Rose, 16; John, 14; Teresa, 13; Anna, 10; Katie, 8; and James, 7. One clause in Hope's will stipulated that "should any of my daughters marry a worthless drunk or spendthrift, her part shall be held in trust by my beloved wife", a precaution that happily never had to be exercised.

A decade later, in 1887, the Southern Pacific Transportation Company built a railroad across Hope Ranch, entering from the flats now occupied by La Cumbre Junior High, veering south of Laguna Blanca to traverse the hillsides along what is now Vieja Drive, and exiting Hope Ranch toward More Mesa at Puente Drive. The line, part of Southern Pacific's Coast Route from Saugus to San Francisco, was surveyed by the engineer Walter Storey and was very crooked because a near-level grade had to be maintained. The railroad was realigned to bypass Hope Ranch in 1901 when the Coast Line was completed after a 14-year delay.

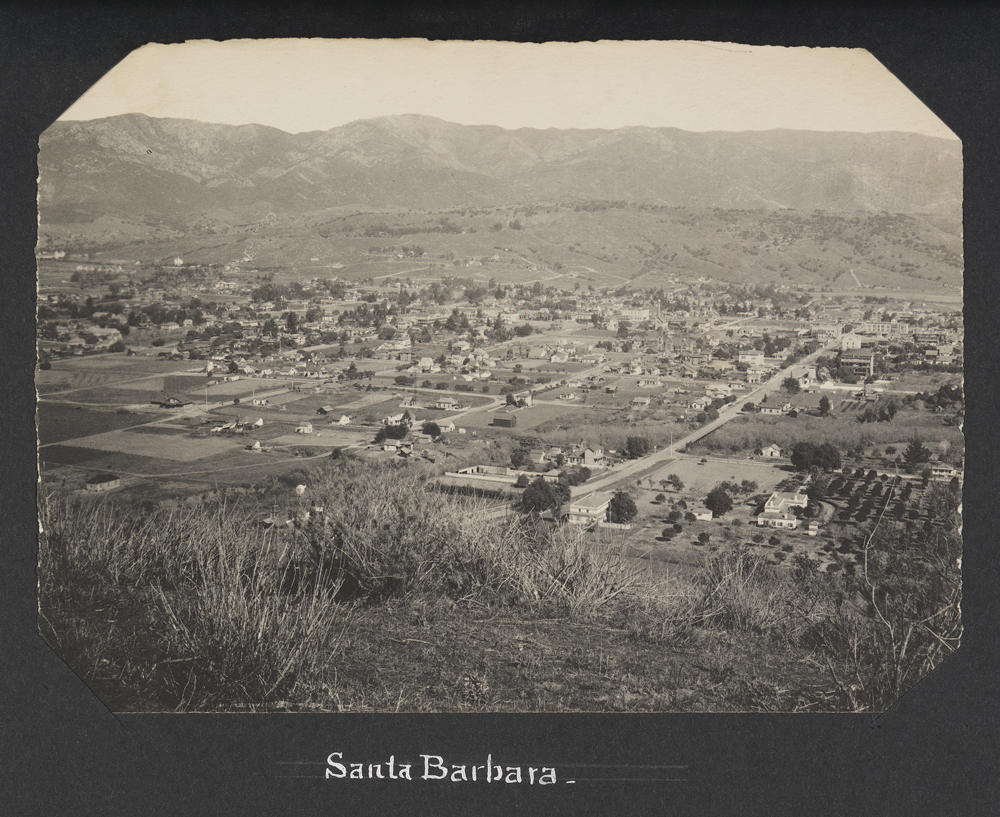
Santa Barbara in 1902

Also in 1887, Delia Hope sold her half of the ranch to the Pacific Improvement Company for $200,000 in gold. The company was founded in 1878 by the Southern Pacific's "Big Four"—Leland Stanford, Charles Crocker, Mark Hopkins Jr., and Collis Potter Huntington—and its agents had long coveted Thomas Hope's land, envisioning it as the ideal site for a tourist resort. In the decades to follow, Hope Ranch would be intensively developed into its present form.

== Early 20th century to World War II ==
=== Silent film industry and continued growth ===
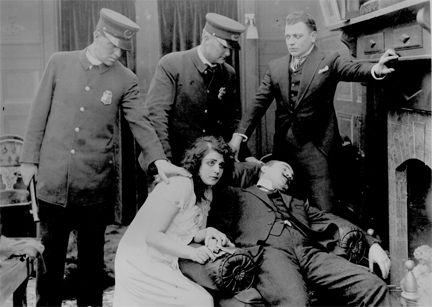
Santa Barbara police officers working as extras during filming of a 1915 Flying A movie production

Santa Barbara was an important part of the U.S. silent film industry from 1910 to 1922. The American Film Manufacturing Company, founded in Chicago in 1910, formally moved its western Flying A Studios from La Mesa, California to Santa Barbara in August, 1912. The Santa Barbara facility became American's main studio; it covered two city blocks centered at State and Mission streets, and was at the time the largest movie studio in the world. American produced approximately 1,200 films, but only about 100 of those films are known to survive today. Many of the studio's films were westerns, but they also produced a wide variety of dramas and comedies based upon contemporary urban life. Allan Dwan, Lon Chaney, Sr., Frank Borzage, and Victor Fleming worked at Flying "A" in their early careers. In 1911, before the Flying A had become the predominant studio in the area, there were 13 separate film companies working in Santa Barbara. The local film era ended in 1922, largely as a result of American's dissolution in 1921, and the remaining studios moved south, needing the resources of a larger city.

During this period, the city continued to grow, and at an even faster pace. By 1920, the population had reached 19,441, tripling in twenty years. The completion of the water tunnel under the mountains to newly completed Gibraltar Reservoir on the Santa Ynez River relieved the water shortages for a time. Also during the teens, a movement for city beautification commenced, led by Bernhard Hoffmann and later by Pearl Chase; their idea was to unify the city's architecture around a Spanish Colonial style, harmonious with the Mission and surviving pueblos. Many of the buildings from the late 19th century were, to their eyes and the eyes of many citizens, ugly, dilapidated, and no different from those in dozens of other run-down western towns. The Lobero Theatre, built on the site of the original Lobero Opera House in 1924, was an example of the architectural style they promoted, as was the first part of the Santa Barbara Natural History Museum.

=== 1925 earthquake ===
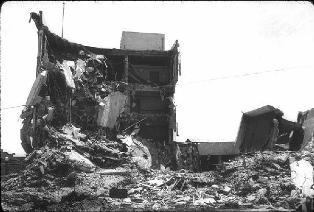
1925 earthquake. View of the collapsed San Marcos building, at Anapamu and State streets

The most destructive earthquake in Santa Barbara history, and the first destructive earthquake in California since the 1906 San Francisco earthquake, occurred on June 29, 1925, converting much of the town to heaps of rubble. While the quake's epicenter was centered on an undetermined fault offshore, most of the damage came about due to two strong aftershocks which occurred onshore and five minutes apart. The intensity on the Modified Mercalli scale was determined to be VIII for the coast from Goleta, through Santa Barbara, and to Carpinteria.

The low death toll (13 or 14) is credited to its early hour, 6:23 a.m., before most people were in the streets at risk from falling masonry. A fire which broke out after the earthquake destroyed more of the town, but was contained by a company of U.S. Marines who had arrived immediately to help maintain order. The earthquake, coinciding with the movement for architectural reform, is credited with giving the town its unified Spanish character; during the rebuilding, Hoffman and Chase pushed for new structures to be in a Spanish style. The most famous of these was the Spanish-Moorish style County Courthouse, completed in 1929, "the loveliest in the United States." One of the few voices opposing the unification of architectural style was newspaper publisher and future Senator Thomas Storke, who later changed his mind, saying that his former opposition was due to his belief that such compulsion infringed on the constitutional rights of property owners. Storke in 1932 created the city's main newspaper for the next 74 years, the Santa Barbara News-Press, by winning a libel suit against his rival Reginald Fernald, and absorbing that publisher's Morning Press into his Daily News.

=== Oil fields and World War II ===
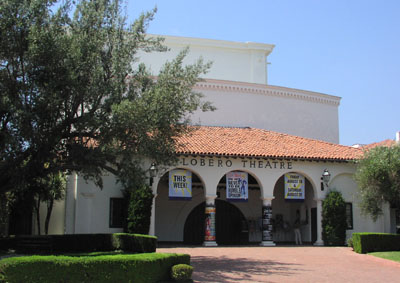
Santa Barbara's Lobero Theatre, from Canon Perdido Street. The theatre opened in 1924, the year before the large earthquake, but survived. It is an example of the Spanish Colonial architectural style which began to be promoted then.

In 1928, oil was found at the Ellwood Oil Field on the other side of Santa Barbara, and development of this new and rich pool was fast: the peak production in 1930, only two years later, was 14.6 million barrels (2,320,000 m^{3}) of oil. As at the Summerland Oil Field, derricks went along piers into the ocean, and the cliffs were dotted with storage tanks. Some of this development remains to the present day, with one active wastewater disposal well and several large storage tanks adjacent to the Ellwood Open Space. In 1929, as part of the wild burst of oil-drilling activity following on the Ellwood discovery, the Mesa Oil Field was discovered within the city limits. Centered just south of Cliff Drive near the intersection with Santa Cruz Boulevard, the field sprouted over 100 oil derricks in the early 1930s, occasioning the city's first anti-oil protest, but a local ordinance had already been enacted allowing such development. The field's failure in the late 1930s—it proved to be smaller than initially thought—allowed residential development to continue on the Mesa, although the field was not formally abandoned until 1976.

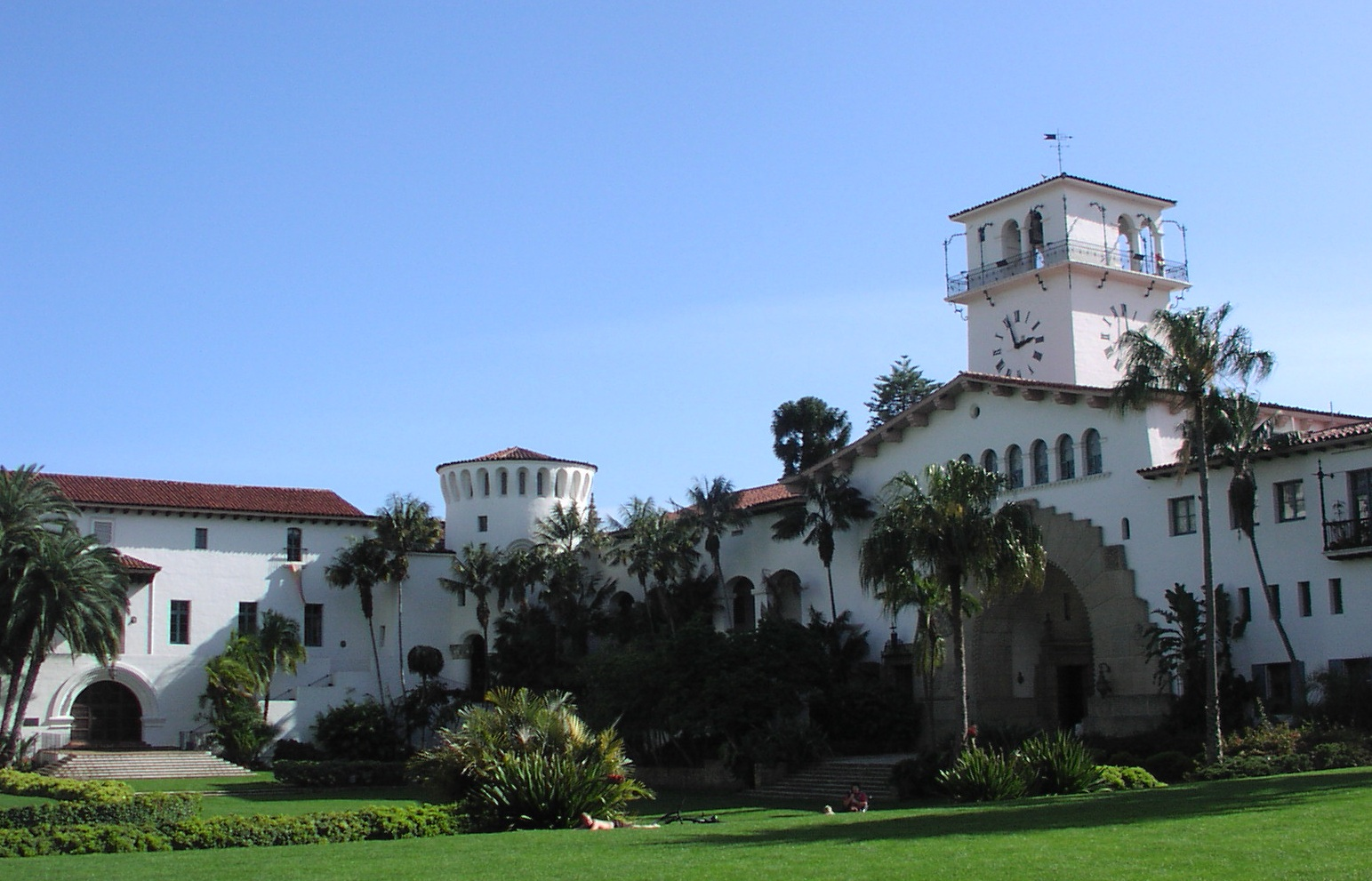
The Santa Barbara County Courthouse, one of the city's main tourist attractions, was completed in 1929.

World War II brought sweeping change to the Santa Barbara area. The U.S. Marines took up residence on the high ground adjacent to Goleta Point, current location of the University of California, Santa Barbara campus. The military filled in the Goleta Slough in order to expand the adjacent airport; the U.S. Navy took over the harbor area; and north of Point Conception the Army created Camp Cooke, which was later to become Vandenberg Air Force Base. On February 23, 1942, not long after the outbreak of war in the Pacific, a Japanese submarine emerged from the ocean and lobbed about 25 shells at the Ellwood Oil Field facilities in its first attack on a land target within the continental United States during the entire war, and the first naval attack on U.S. soil by an enemy power on such target since the bombardment of Orleans during World War I. Although the gunners were terrible marksmen, and only caused about $500 damage to a catwalk, panic was immediate. Many Santa Barbara residents fled, and land values plummeted to historic lows. Only one week after the attack, on March 2, military authorities issued Public Proclamation No. 1, which began the long internment of Japanese during the war, and approximately 700 people of Japanese ancestry assembled on Cabrillo Boulevard to be taken to Manzanar.

In 1941, the Santa Barbara Museum of Art was founded in the former Santa Barbara Post Office building.

== After World War II ==
After the war ended, many people who had seen Santa Barbara during the war came back to stay. The population grew by 10,000 by 1950, in just five years. During this time the University of California took over the blufftop Marine camp, turning it into a modern university. The burst of growth brought traffic, housing, and water problems, which led to improvements in the transportation system, such as the building of Highway 101 through town; tracts of low-cost housing, especially on the Mesa, where oil derricks were removed and replaced by houses; and the building of Lake Cachuma reservoir on the other side of the mountains, along with another water tunnel to bring its water to thirsty residents. During this period, the city selectively recruited businesses to relocate there, choosing clean industries such as aerospace and technology in preference to the oil industry which had already marred many local landscapes with abandoned wells and sumps. In 1959, Santa Barbara Junior College was moved to its present Mesa location and renamed Santa Barbara City College.

The oil industry moved most of its local operations offshore during the 1950s and 1960s. In 1947, offshore leases were approved by the federal government, and seismic exploration of the Channel took place in the 1950s, even though fishermen complained that the underwater explosions were killing fish. The first of the huge black fifteen-story oil platforms, a feature of the seascape south of Santa Barbara for fifty years, went up in 1958. During the period, Stearns Wharf was the main connection for oil services going out to the platforms.

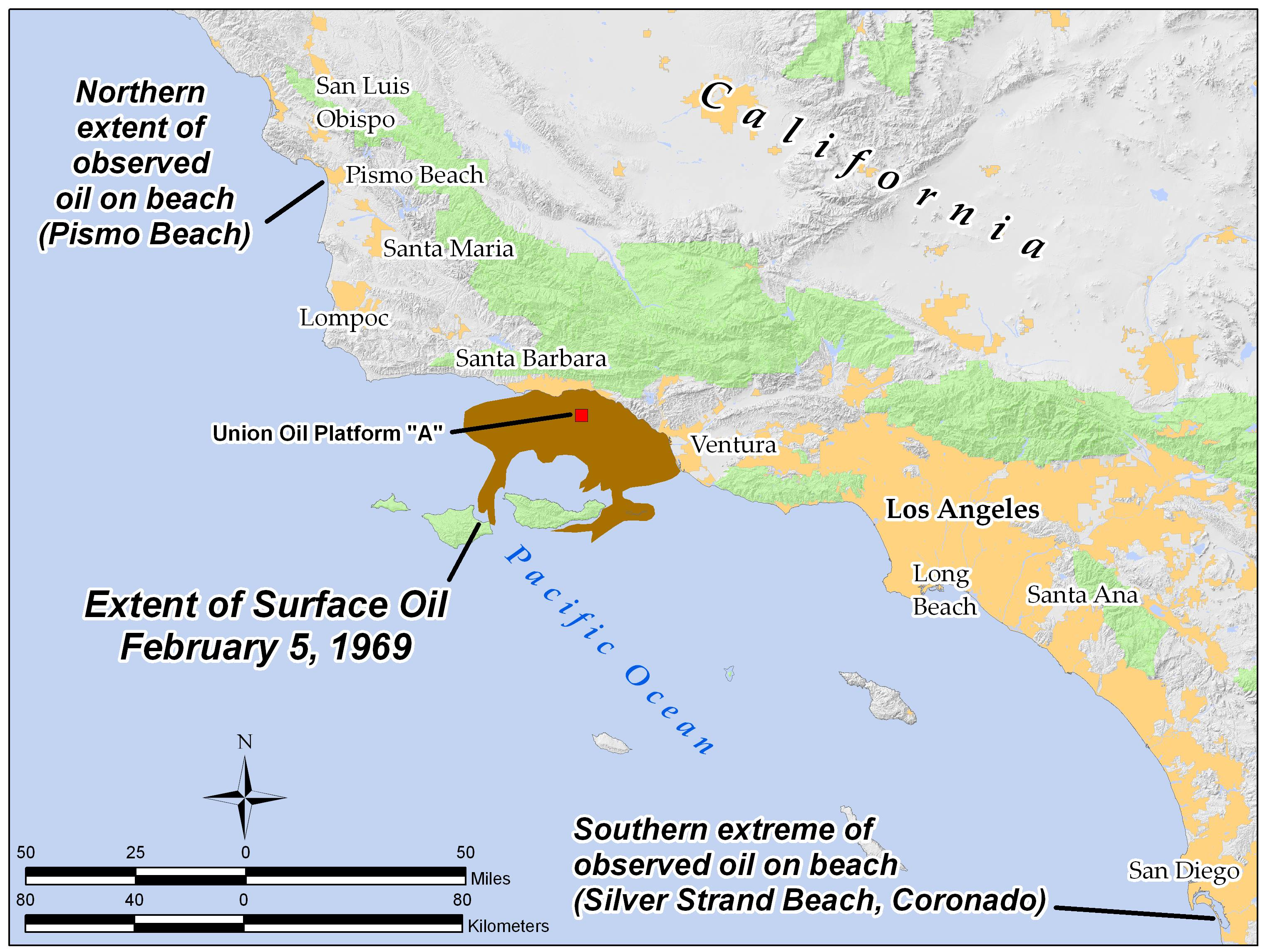
The extent of the 1969 Santa Barbara oil spill

Making the relationship between Santa Barbara and the oil industry even worse was the disaster of January 28, 1969, one of the formative events in the modern environmental movement. A blowout on an offshore oil well at the Dos Cuadras Offshore Oil Field spewed between 80,000 and 100,000 barrels (13,000 and 16,000 m^{3}) of oil, producing an immense oil slick which spread over hundreds of square miles of ocean in the Santa Barbara Channel, contaminating shorelines, killing wildlife, ruining the tourist industry, and appearing on television screens worldwide. The anti-oil group "GOO" (Get Oil Out) formed shortly after the spill, and oil drilling has been a sensitive issue in the area ever since. Wider consequences of the spill included the 1970 passage of both the National Environmental Policy Act and the California Environmental Quality Act, laws which require assessment of potential environmental impacts of projects before they begin.

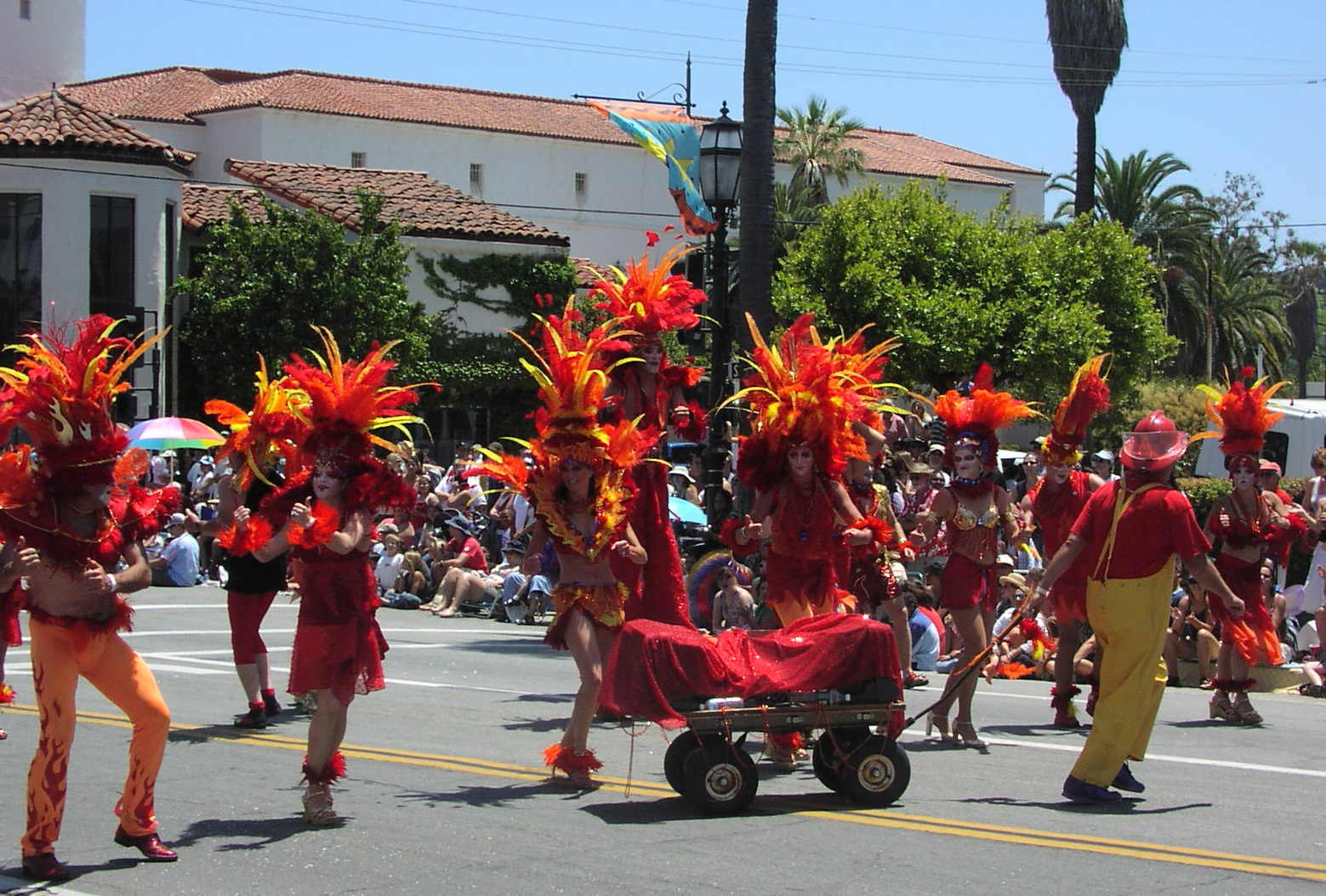
The annual Summer Solstice Parade, which began in 1974, is the city's largest single-day tourist event, commonly drawing over 100,000 visitors.

The population center of Santa Barbara moved west during this period, with the buildout of the region west of the De La Vina/State intersection, including the San Roque neighborhood, Hope Ranch Annex, and later the Goleta Valley. As a result, the citrus groves which formerly stood in the region were cut down and replaced by housing and commercial districts. Regional shopping centers such as Loreto Plaza, Five Points, and La Cumbre Plaza developed during this period. Between 1960 and 1970, the population of the Goleta Valley rose from only 19,016 to 60,184.

By the mid-1970s, forces opposing uncontrolled growth had become stronger than those favoring development. On April 8, 1975, the City Council passed a resolution to limit the city's population to 85,000 through zoning. In order to limit growth in adjacent areas, such as Goleta, it was standard to deny water meters to developments which had been approved by the County Board of Supervisors, effectively shutting off growth. The city and immediately adjacent areas stopped their fast growth, but housing prices rose sharply.

Several catastrophic fires burned portions of Santa Barbara and the adjacent mountains in the late 20th century. In 1964, the Coyote Fire burned 67,000 acres (270 km^{2}) of backcountry along with 150 homes, blackening the mountain wall behind Santa Barbara, and briefly threatening the entire town of Montecito. In 1977, the smaller but more destructive Sycamore Fire roared down Sycamore Canyon on the northeast fringe of Santa Barbara, destroying over 200 homes. Most destructive of all was the 1990 Painted Cave Fire, which incinerated over 500 homes in just several hours during an intense Sundowner wind event, crossing over the freeway to Hope Ranch, and causing over a quarter billion dollars in damage.

== 21st century ==
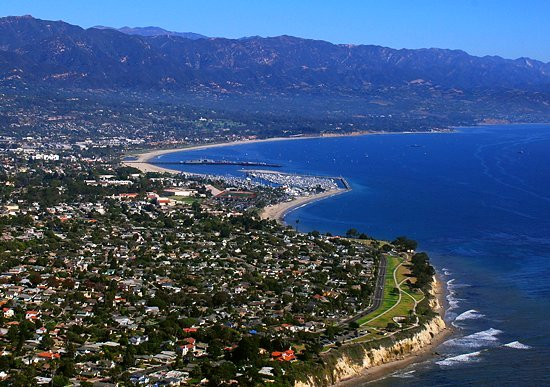
An aerial view of Santa Barbara in 2008

When voters approved a city connection to state water supplies in 1991, parts of Santa Barbara, especially outlying areas, resumed growth, but more slowly than during the boom period of the 1950s and 1960s. While the slow growth preserved the quality of life for most residents and prevented the urban sprawl notorious in the Los Angeles basin, housing became in short supply, and prices soared: in 2006, only six percent of residents could afford a median-value house. As a result, many people who work in Santa Barbara commute from adjacent, more affordable areas, such as Santa Maria, Lompoc, and Ventura. The resultant traffic on incoming arteries, particularly the stretch of Highway 101 between Ventura and Santa Barbara, is another problem being addressed by long-range planners.

In 2000, billionaire and recent Santa Barbara transplant Wendy McCaw, bought the local paper of record, the Santa Barbara News-Press in a move initially approved by much of the community. However, in 2006 the owner began inserting her locally unpopular libertarian political leanings into the paper and disrupting daily news reporting operations. These efforts to erode the editorial independence of the historic local newspaper resulted in a mass employee walkout and sustained community protest against the owner, a saga which came to be known as the News-Press Mess. The paper continued to lose readership until McCaw placed the News-Press into bankruptcy in 2023. This move was met by a long-awaited community groundswell to save the paper and resulted in its purchase out of bankruptcy by a local group in 2024. By late 2025 the News-Press had been restructured as a 501(c)(3) nonprofit and had returned to daily publishing.

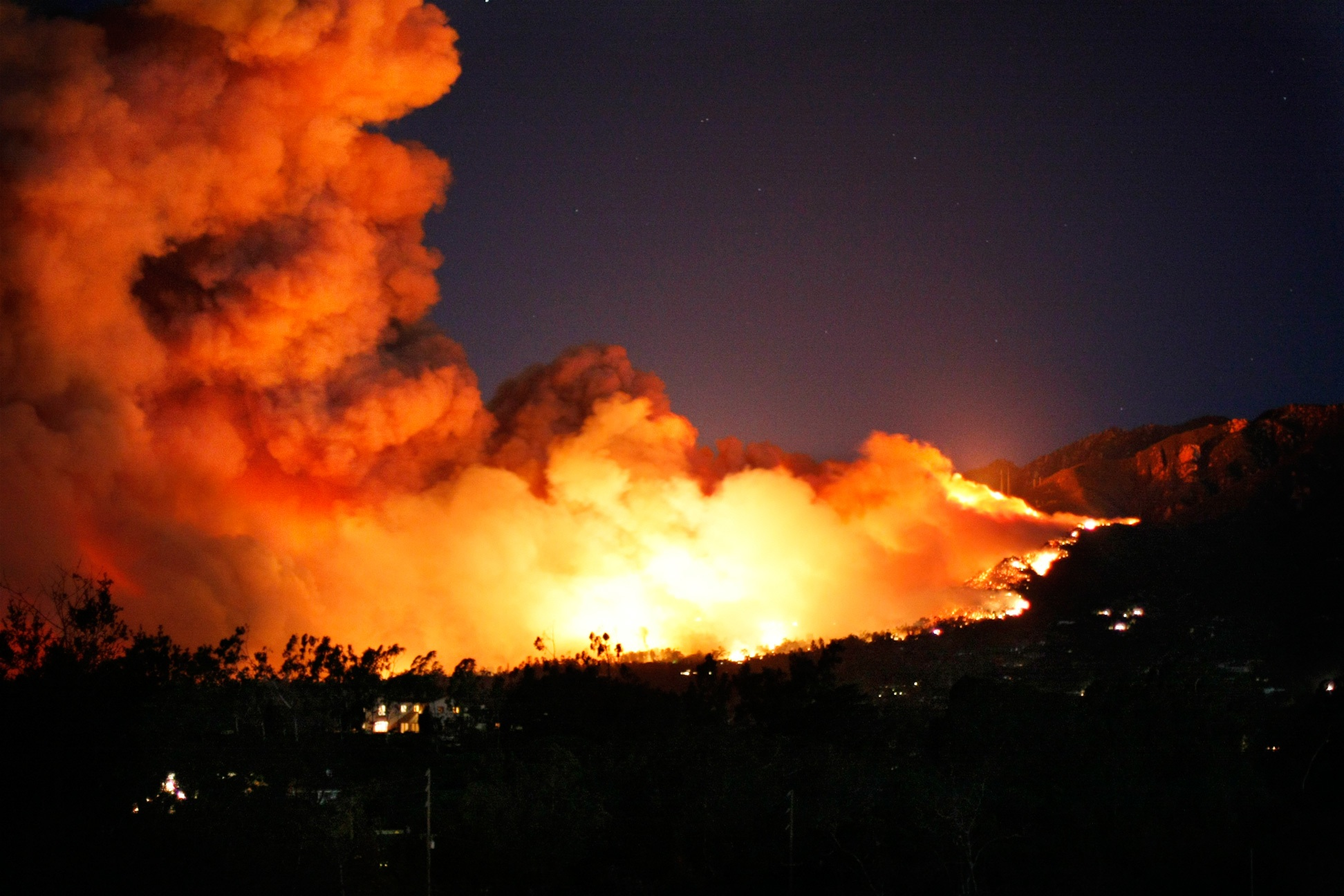
The Tea Fire raging in the Montecito—Santa Barbara area on November 13, 2008

In November 2008, the Tea Fire which started in Montecito burned 1,800 acres and destroyed 130 residences in the northeastern area of Santa Barbara city. A 98-year-old man who had evacuated died for medical reasons potentially related to the fire. Damages were high due to the area's numerous expensive homes. California governor Arnold Schwarzenegger declared a state of emergency for the county. The fire potentially started from an illegal bonfire lit by ten young people near Westmont College on November 12; there was not proof beyond a reasonable doubt that the bonfire led to the Tea Fire, however, meaning they were only charged with misdemeanors relating to the bonfire.

Similarly, in May 2009, the Jesusita Fire burned 8,733 acres and destroyed 80 residences northwest of the city. The fire was potentially started by two people near the Jesusita Trail who had used a weed whacker in hot weather. Like with the Tea Fire, the county did not press felony charges because they could not prove a connection between the weed whacker and the Jesusita Fire. The two people were instead charged with misdemeanors for operating the machine without a hot work permit, to which the two plead no contest.

On May 19, 2015, the Santa Barbara coast was affected by the Refugio oil spill, caused by a ruptured pipeline from Plains All American Pipeline company.

From December 2017 to June 2018, the Thomas Fire burned 281,893 acres and destroyed more than 1,000 structures in Santa Barbara and Ventura counties. It reached the edge of Santa Barbara city. Amid dry conditions and Santa Ana winds, the fire spread rapidly and widely, killing a firefighter and causing deadly mudflows in Montecito. It was the largest fire that Cal Fire had dealt with since they started compiling a list in 1932. $177 million was spent on battling it over six months.

On September 1, 2019, the dive boat MV Conception left Santa Barbara Harbor for Santa Cruz Island. Docked at the island, 33 passengers and one crew member were sleeping on board on September 2 around 3 a.m. when the ship caught fire and sank, killing all 34 of them.

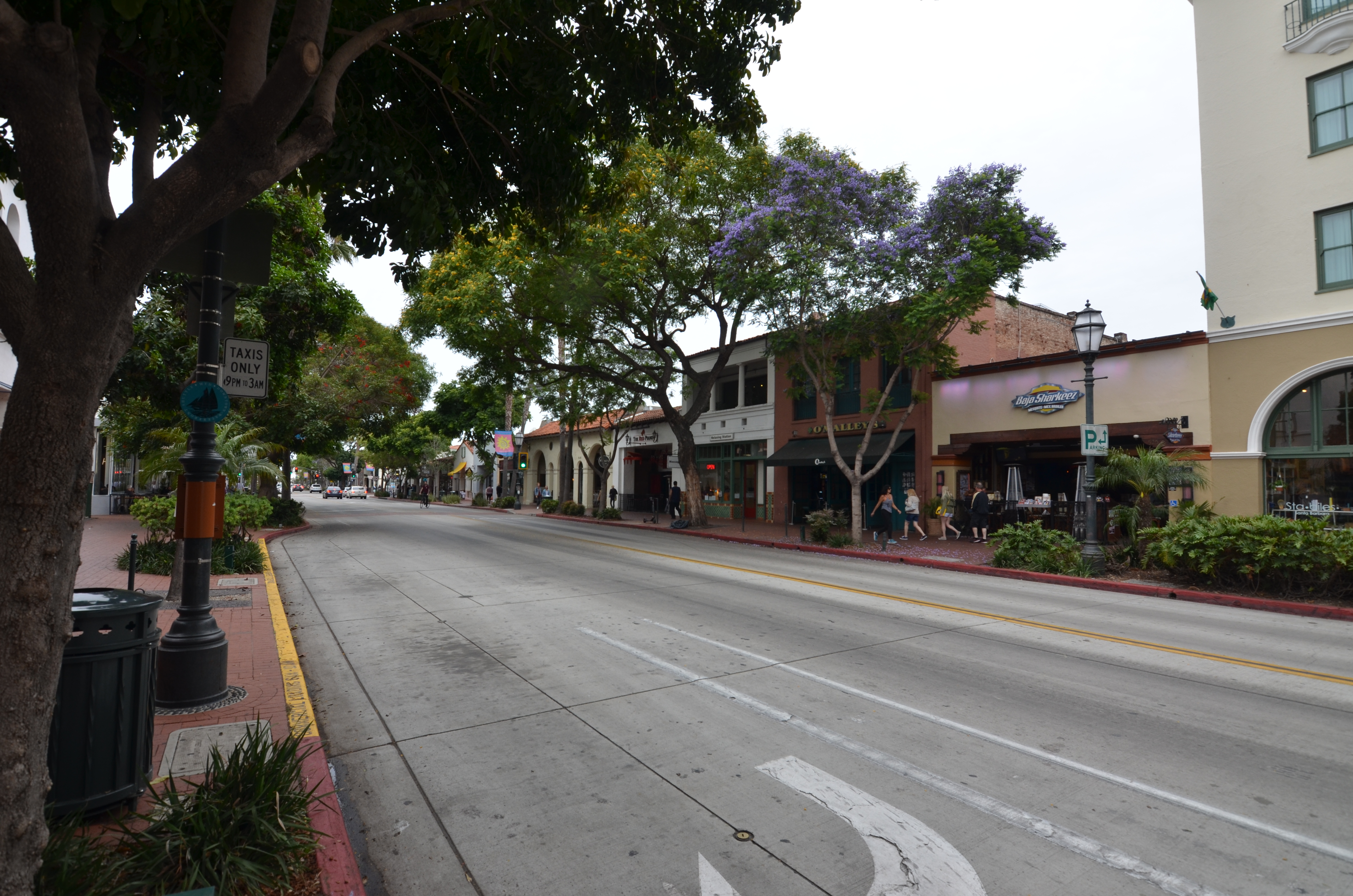
State Street in 2019, before cars were disallowed on a portion of the street in 2020

Starting in the mid-2010s, the downtown State Street corridor began to see higher commercial vacancy rates, increased homelessness, and a general downturn in foot traffic. Worsening the crisis was the COVID-19 pandemic, which killed a reported 765 city residents from 2020 to March 23, 2023. Multiple businesses—retail franchises and locally owned shops—closed, and in response, the city closed off eight blocks of State Street to cars, making it a pedestrian mall; reaction to the change was mixed, but as the pandemic waned, the street continued mostly as is.

In 2025, joint proposals were presented by developers to the city council proposing to revitalize State Street's outdoor Paseo Nuevo mall. In 2026 the city council approved the plan for local software company, Yardi Systems to acquire and substantially redevelop Paseo Nuevo as the anchor tenant of a downtown revival effort. At the same time, the city moved forward with an ambitious $100 million State Street Master Plan to formally redesign the street around pedestrian foot traffic.

== See also ==
- Category: Ranchos of Santa Barbara County, California
- List of mayors of Santa Barbara, California
- Bibliography of California history
