= American Journalism Review =

American magazine about journalism

- American Journalism Review (Spring 2013)
- Categories: Journalism, Journalism Review
- Frequency: Varied
- First issue: October 1977
- Final issue: 2013 (print) 2015 (online)
- Company: Philip Merrill College of Journalism; University of Maryland, College Park
- Country: United States
- Based in: College Park, Maryland
- Language: English
- Website: ajr.org
- ISSN: 1067-8654

The American Journalism Review (AJR) was an American magazine covering topics in journalism. It was launched in 1977 as the Washington Journalism Review by journalist Roger Kranz. It ceased publication in 2015.

== History and profile ==
The first issue of the magazine appeared in October 1977. In 1987, it was acquired by Henry Catto, a former U.S. ambassador, and his wife Jessica Hobby Catto, who was part of the family that published the Houston Post. The Cattos donated the publication to the University of Maryland, College Park in 1987. In 1992, Rem Rieder became the editor. It took the name American Journalism Review in 1993. The university's Philip Merrill College of Journalism took control of the journal in 2011. Rem Rieder left in 2013, and AJR became an online-only publication within the Merrill College's curriculum. In July 2015, the college announced that it was terminating publication.

== Notable events ==
In January 1999, the Gannett Company pulled all its advertising, a few weeks after AJR published an article that contained negative comments about several Gannett leaders.

In its December 2006 issue, the AJR printed an article about the Santa Barbara News-Press and its owner, Wendy P. McCaw. Later that month, McCaw sued the article's author, Susan Paterno, accusing her of libel and product disparagement. This instance of a newspaper suing an individual journalist was highly unusual and though the AJR was not a named defendant, it agreed to pay Paterno's legal bills and indemnify her against any judgment. Paterno would ultimately prevail in the action as well as an Anti-SLAPP (Strategic Lawsuit Against Public Participation) suit she brought in conjunction with the AJR.

In August 2007, The Washington Post reported that the AJR could shut down by the end of 2007 if it could not reduce its operating deficit, then running at about $200,000 per year (with a total budget of about $800,000). Donors provided at least a third of the budget; the remainder is from advertising. Donations to the AJR from 2004-2007 included about $1.25 million from a group of news veterans headed by former Philadelphia Inquirer executive editor Eugene Roberts. By mid-2007, the AJR had only one full-time editorial employee, editor Rem Rieder, with the design and artwork of the magazine contracted out. Most of the content of the AJR was from outside contributors (freelancers).

In 2013, the Review ceased print publication and became an online-only publication. The online publication ended in 2015, although the archives were to remain available online.

== See also ==
- Columbia Journalism Review
- Santa Barbara News-Press controversy
