= Labor relations at the Santa Barbara News-Press =

For activities prior to and surrounding this topic, see Santa Barbara News-Press controversy.

Organized labor relations at the Santa Barbara News-Press were highlighted by a 33–6 vote of editorial department employees at the Santa Barbara, California, newspaper on September 27, 2006, to join the Graphic Communications Conference (GCC) of the International Brotherhood of Teamsters. In August, 2007, the labor board certified the union as the exclusive bargaining representative of the news department employees.

The tactics of the newsroom staff included a pledge drive encouraging subscribers to cancel the paper if demands were not met by September 5, 2006, as detailed on their website. A branch of the Teamsters has filed many unfair labor practice charges on behalf of the remaining staffers, which have been contested by the News-Press management. On August 31, 2006 eleven of the remaining News-Press newsroom staff received two-day suspension notices from management for allegedly participating in improper union organizing activity; some have claimed, and two NLRB Administrative Law Judges have found, that the activity was protected by labor law, innocuous and consisted only of attempting to deliver a letter to McCaw during a break. The suspended staff were: Al Bonowitz, Melissa Evans, Kim Favors, Dawn Hobbs, Karna Hughes, George Hutti, Rob Kuznia, Barney McManigal, Lara Milton, and Tom Schultz; Mike Traphagen chose to resign earlier than announced rather than accept the suspension. The Sep. 5 deadline set by the employees passed, and the staff through their Teamsters representative Marty Keegan called for subscribers to cancel their subscriptions to the paper. McCaw refused offers from local political leaders, religious leaders, and prominent journalists such as Sander Vanocur and Lou Cannon to help resolve the conflict. A vote by newsroom staff on unionizing under the Teamsters took place on September 27, 2006. The vote was 33 to 6 in favor of the union.

The News-Press first questioned the validity of the election, and then formally contested the validity of the election. On October 30, 2006, the Teamsters filed an unfair-labor-practice charge over the Oct. 27 firing of veteran reporter and labor leader Melinda Burns. On November 13, the National Labor Relations Board (NLRB) decided to file a complaint charging the News-Press management with violations of the National Labor Relations Act. The causes for the complaint include the cancellation of Starshine Roshell's column and the two-day suspensions for improper labor organizing activity. On December 7, 2006, the NLRB denied News-Press appeals concerning the newsroom staff behavior and vote to unionize. On December 11, 2006, the NLRB dismissed one charge brought by the Teamsters against the News-Press, and the Teamsters themselves withdrew three charges. On December 28, 2006, the NLRB filed a complaint concerning alleged News-Press retribution against employees who supported unionization.

== NLRB hearings ==
The NLRB hearing to address the complaint by the News-Press concerning the September 27, 2006 election took place in Santa Barbara on Jan. 9–10, 2007. Four specific points were raised by the News-Press: 1) that supervisors were involved in the election; 2) the Save the News-Press Website confused voters into believing the News-Press itself supported unionization; 3) an anonymous threat on blogabarbara intimidated voters into supporting unionization and 4) newsroom staff engaged in threatening behavior. Many of the principals in the News-Press controversy testified during the two-day hearing. On March 12, 2007, the NLRB judge issued his decision in favor of the unionization vote on September 27. In that ruling, eventually upheld by the NLRB in Washington, D.C., the ALJ found the key witnesses for the News-Press, Travis Armstrong and Scott Steepleton, to be not credible witnesses, who "prevaricated", "embellished" and "exaggerated" their testimony in an unsuccessful effort to obtain their desired result of thwarting the employees' desire to have union representation.

A second NLRB hearing, focused on the propriety of the News-Press firing of reporter Melinda Burns and other issues, originally scheduled for Mar. 12, 2007 was delayed. On March 13, 2007, the NLRB announced that the News-Press would be prosecuted over the firing of Burns, various other issues, and the firing of seven other reporters and one editor. An NLRB attorney wrote that the General Counsel believed the News-Press had violated labor law in its firings of reporters. A News-Press attorney responded, "We're watching the end of the industry. Journalists think they can write what they want when they want. I don't know if that can survive in this age." Attorneys for the News-Press filed their "exceptions," a form of appeal, to the NLRB judge's rulings in early April, 2007. The Teamsters filed their response in mid-April, 2007. On August 11, 2011, the NLRB, in a 3–0 decision including two Democratic NLRB members and one Republican, voted to uphold Judge Kocol's decision in its entirety, and ordered the News-Press to reinstate all eight unlawfully fired reporters and pay them backpay, and have a Notice read aloud to the employees in the presence of management, which is, for the NLRB, an extraordinary remedy.

== Later actions ==
A News-Press attorney and accountant entered a meeting between ex-News-Press staff, Teamster officials, and local business people on February 14, 2007. The purpose of the meeting was to encourage advertisers to withhold advertisements from the News-Press. The News-Press attorney accused the ex-News-Press staff of mendacity, was invited to leave by a union representative, and only left when the Teamster representative sarcastically invited him to bargain. The Teamsters have filed a complaint with the NLRB over the incident, asserting that management may not force themselves into labor meetings without an invitation; the News-Press asserts that because the meeting was held in a public building, they were entitled to attend. The Teamsters had paid a fee to use the room where the meeting occurred. The General Counsel of the NLRB prosecuted the News-Press for this among many other violations of federal labor law.

The actions of the News-Press attorney and accountant were added as an unfair labor practice charge by the NLRB against the News-Press in early April, 2007. As of April 9, 2007, the NLRB has decided to bring 19 unfair labor practice charges against the News-Press. A hearing on many of these charges is scheduled for August 14, 2007 in Santa Barbara. In June, 2007, the NLRB announced that two charges against the News-Press, concerning statements made by their attorney and a restatement of their conflict-of-interest policy, had been dropped, and that they would not require the immediate reinstatement of fired reporters to their jobs.

The unfair labor practice hearing lasted 17 days in August and September, 2007, and in December, 2007, the ALJ ruled in favor of the General Counsel and against the News-Press on each of the charges brought against the newspaper, including nine discharges, the cancellation of Starshine Roshell's column, discriminatory evaluations of four reporters, interrogation, surveillance and a demand that employees remove "McCaw, Obey the Law" signs from their cars and buttons from their clothing. The ALJ again found both Steepleton—who claimed responsibility for all 9 firings held to be unlawful—and Armstrong to be not credible witnesses. The ALJ also found McCaw's testimony not credible. The News-Press maintained throughout the administrative hearing that the union campaign had nothing to do with working conditions but was rather an attempt by a few disgruntled reporters to wrest editorial control of the paper from its management; that the actions of the paper and its owner were wholly within the law; and that the reporters' actions violated the First Amendment freedom of the press. The ALJ rejected all of those contentions. The News-Press did not invoke its First Amendment rights in firing any of the nine people who the ALJ found to have been unlawfully terminated. The News-Press filed exceptions to the ALJ's ruling, which is pending before the NLRB in Washington.

In May 2008, a Federal district court denied injunctive relief sought by the regional director of the National Labor Relations Board in Los Angeles, who had asked for the reinstatement of eight reporters who had been discharged. The court ruled that the newspaper's First Amendment rights to control content were threatened by the reporters' unionization campaign and thus were sufficient to immunize the otherwise possibly unlawful retaliatory firings.

On May 22, 2008, Federal Judge Stephen Wilson issued an Order which the newspaper has claimed vindicates the News-Press. The court refused to issue an injunction that would have provided for immediate enforcement of the ALJ's ruling against the News-Press, criticizing some of its reasoning as "clearly erroneous." (The ruling does not affect the NLRB's consideration of the ALJ's decision) The Judge found that a theme of the union campaign was to influence editorial control of the paper, and that the ALJ's recommended ruling posed a significant risk of violating the First Amendment rights of the paper. It was the court's unprecedented view that the First Amendment may license the newspaper's management to violate the NLRA in these circumstances. The NLRB has appealed that ruling to the Ninth Circuit Court of Appeals.

In 2008, the Teamsters began a campaign to handbill local business owners who advertise in the News-Press. The News-Press filed charges alleging an illegal secondary boycott and acts of intimidation and coercion against local business owners, which the General Counsel referred to the NLRB's Office of Advice for consideration, and after lengthy deliberation, has now dismissed. The General Counsel's office in Washington, D.C. has rejected the News-Press' appeal of that dismissal. The only allegation of violence occurred when a Teamster representative was struck by an enraged customer who did not agree with the Teamsters' activities. The United States Supreme Court and the California Supreme Court have upheld handbilling of customers of businesses that do business with the employer involved in a labor dispute, citing constitutional concerns if such activity were to be regulated or restricted.

The News-Press has filed over 20 unfair labor practice charges against the union, all of which have been dismissed. Bargaining between the union and the News-Press began in November, 2007. The General Counsel of the NLRB has concluded after investigation that the News-Press has bargained in bad faith in violation of federal labor law, and announced in July, 2008 that he will prosecute the News-Press for that refusal to bargain in good faith.

In March, 2009, the General Counsel issued a complaint against the News-Press for its bad faith bargaining, and for numerous other unfair labor practices, including ceasing certain employment practices after the union won the election, such as providing annual raises and employee evaluations. Several other charges filed against the News-Press, including interference with the NLRB's investigative processes, were investigated by the General Counsel's staff and have now been authorized for another prosecution against the News-Press. In addition, the General Counsel alleged that the News-Press violated federal labor law by: hiring temporary employees to perform bargaining unit work; hiring an independent contractor to do investigative reporting; bargaining in bad faith by making predictably unacceptable proposals and seeking to maintain unilateral control over terms and conditions of employment; and by discontinuing pre-union practices such as granting annual raises and providing annual evaluations. The General Counsel has also announced he will prosecute the News-Press for illegally firing Dennis Moran, a copy editor and sports writer, who served on the union's bargaining committee, and for interfering with the NLRB's investigative process. That prosecution has now concluded, having consumed over 20 hearing days during May, June, July and August, 2009. On May 28, 2010, ALJ Clifford Anderson found against the News-Press and in favor of the General Counsel, determining that the News-Press violated federal labor law by: bargaining in bad faith without genuine intent to reach agreement; using temporary employees to undermine the bargaining unit; firing a bargaining committee member for illegal reasons based on pretext; discontinuing its longstanding practice of giving annual merit raises; terminating another unit member without notice to the Union; ordering a unilateral change in productivity standards; instructing employees not to discuss terms and conditions of employment discussed at a meeting; discouraging cooperation with NLRB investigations; and changing the employee evaluations procedures. ALJ Anderson found management representative Scott Steepleton's testimony in this hearing to be not credible, which is the third time in three NLRB hearings before three different ALJs that Steepleton has been found to be not truthful. Steepleton then wrote an inaccurate and biased article in the News-Press purporting to describe the ALJ's decision, which did not mention his role in the proceeding, or seek the position of the NLRB or Union.

The General Counsel has issued yet another complaint against the News-Press, this time for its attorneys' misconduct in issuing subpoenas in connection with the 2009 hearing before Judge Anderson seeking employees' affidavits provided in confidence to the NLRB's investigators. This is the second time the same attorneys have issued such subpoenas seeking confidential employee affidavits, even though they were admonished by Judge Kocol when they did it the first time. The hearing in that matter, scheduled for October 26, 2009, has been completed. In February, 2010, ALJ Lana Parke found that the News-Press' attorneys did in fact violate federal labor law by issuing the improper subpoenas.
