= Printing, Packaging & Production Workers Union of North America =

- Abbreviation: PPPWU
- Predecessor: Graphic Communications Conference
- Formation: 2023
- Locations: Quebec; United States
- Parent organization: International Association of Machinists and Aerospace Workers
- Website: https://pppwu.org/

The Printing, Packaging & Production Workers Union of North America (PPPWU) is a trade union in the United States and Quebec, Canada, which represents workers in all craft and skill areas in the printing and publishing industry.

== History ==
The Printing, Packaging & Production Workers Union of North America was created after the Graphic Communications Conference sued to separate from the International Brotherhood of Teamsters in 2023. After the separation was confirmed in US federal court in 2024, the locals then became an autonomous component of the International Association of Machinists and Aerospace Workers.
