= Santa Barbara Independent =

Santa Barbara independent newspaper

The Santa Barbara Independent
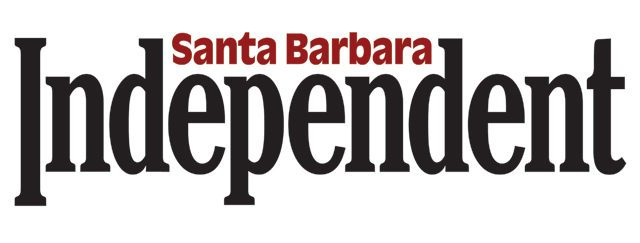
- Type: Alternative newspaper
- Format: Tabloid
- Publisher: Brandi Rivera
- Editor-in-chief: Marianne Partridge
- Founded: 1986
- Headquarters: 1715 State St. Santa Barbara, CA 93101; United States
- Circulation: 40,000
- Website: www.independent.com

The Santa Barbara Independent is a news, arts, and alternative newspaper published every Thursday in Santa Barbara, California, United States.

== History ==
The weekly paper was founded in November 1986, the result of a merger between The Santa Barbara News & Review (established 1973), and The Santa Barbara Weekly (established 1984). It was founded by four people within a corporation — Randy Campbell, publisher, who grew up in Santa Barbara, and is the former owner of The Santa Barbara Weekly; Marianne Partridge, who came to California from New York in the 1980s and is the editor-in-chief; and two silent partners, Rick Grand-Jean and Richard Parker. Joe Cole became president in January, 2014. In 2017, Brandi Rivera was named publisher

Partridge, Grand-Jean, and Parker are all former co-owners of The Santa Barbara News & Review which they purchased in 1984.

== Circulation ==
In 2010 the Independent had a circulation of 40,000, the largest circulated newspaper in Santa Barbara County.

== Attributes ==
The paper includes news stories, arts, music, book, and film coverage, an entertainment calendar, a lifestyle section, and reviews of restaurants and culture. The Independent also does investigative reporting on a variety of issues, from the environment to local politics.

After the beginning of the Santa Barbara News-Press controversy in 2006, the Independent implemented Web-based columns and news articles at independent.com. The internet edition is updated daily, and more frequently during some local events, such as the 2008 Gap and Tea brush fires and the Jesusita fire in 2009. A community-alert system called IndyAlert has also been developed to send out e-mail and cell-phone messages during disasters and community emergencies. The website, independent.com, was deemed the most-visited news website in Santa Barbara County.

In 2008 and 2013, the newspaper industry magazine Editor & Publisher named the Independent the "Best Weekly Affiliated Website in the United States." In 2008 the Independent was named one of "10 That Do It Right."

The newspaper has been described by editor-in-chief Marianne Partridge as "more often than not a tabloid primarily for entertainment purposes, and somewhat liberal."

== Lawsuit ==
Campbell tried to sell his controlling shares in the Independent in 2009 to a Los Angeles newspaper company. Partridge sued Campbell in 2010 to force the sale of shares, claiming that he had breached her right-of-first refusal. Campbell filed a cross action against financial supporter Joe Cole, former Santa Barbara News-Press publisher and former lawyer for The Independent and Campbell. Campbell's cross complaint was dismissed in 2013, and appealed later that year. A settlement was reached in early 2014.

The dispute between Partridge and Campbell was tried in August, 2011. The court ruled in Partridge's favor that Campbell had breached and must sell his shares. Campbell appealed the trial court's decision. The appellate court returned the case to the trial court unchanged in April, 2013, but ordered a recalculation of the fine points of the sale price. The final judgment in 2013 confirmed Campbell's obligation to sell his shares to Partridge and ordered him to pay attorney's fees and costs, and increased the sales price with interest.

== See also ==
- Santa Barbara News-Press controversy
