= Rancho Las Positas y La Calera =

Land grant in California

Coordinates: 34.430°N 119.750°W

Rancho Las Positas y La Calera was a 3,282-acre (13.28 km^{2}) Mexican land grant in present-day Santa Barbara County, California. The grant consisted of two parts:- "La Calera" (The Lime Kiln) given in 1843 by Governor Manuel Micheltorena to Narciso Fabregat, and "Las Positas" (Spanish for "little pools", the diminutive form of "las pozas" - probably referring to water from Veronica Springs) given in 1846 by Governor Pío Pico to Thomas M. Robbins. The grant was the northwest of the pueblo and Presidio of Santa Barbara, and encompassed the present day Hope Ranch, Hidden Valley, and Campanil neighborhoods.

== History ==
Narciso Fabregat was a Lieutenant with the "Mazatlan Volunteers" sent in 1819 to protect the Santa Barbara Presidio and pueblo from attack by the privateer Hippolyte de Bouchard. In 1845, Fabregat sold La Calera to Thomas Robbins. Thomas M. Robbins (1801–1854) was a Nantucket, Massachusetts sea captain who came to California in 1823. Robbins married Maria Encarnacion Carrillo (1814-1876), daughter of Carlos Antonio Carrillo, in Santa Barbara in 1834. In July 1846, Robbins added the additional half square league grant "Las Positas" given to him by Pio Pico. Robbins was also granted Santa Catalina Island by Pío Pico in 1846.

With the cession of California to the United States following the Mexican-American War, the 1848 Treaty of Guadalupe Hidalgo provided that the land grants would be honored. As required by the Land Act of 1851, a claim for Rancho Las Positas y La Calera was filed with the Public Land Commission in 1852, and the grant was patented to Thomas M. Robbins in 1870.

In 1861, Thomas Hope bought the co-joined Rancho Las Positas y La Calera from Robbins' widow Encarnacion Carrillo. Thomas W. Hope (1820–1876) was born in County Meath Ireland and came to the United States in 1836. He learned sheep and cattle ranching in West Texas. During the Gold Rush he went to San Francisco, where he married Delia Fox. Thomas Hope moved to Santa Barbara in 1850 to become a sheep rancher and prospered, especially when the price of wool skyrocketed during the American Civil War. Thomas Hope died in 1876, and left the western half of the rancho to his widow, Delia, and the eastern half to his six children (Anna, Katie, John, Rosa, Theresa, and James). In 1887, Delia Hope sold her half to the Pacific Improvement Company and moved to San Francisco. Delia Hope's sale marked the beginning of the development of the present-day Hope Ranch. In 1892 Thomas Hope’s body was exhumed and taken to San Francisco for reburial.

== Historic sites of the Rancho ==
Thomas Hope House. Designed by prominent architect Peter J. Barber, the home was completed in 1875. Thomas Hope House is a Santa Barbara County Landmark and is listed on the National Register of Historical Places.

== See also ==
- Ranchos of California
- List of Ranchos of California
- History of Santa Barbara, California
- Hope Ranch, California
