= Noozhawk =

Online newspaper in California, United States

- Format: Online
- Founder: William Macfadyen
- Editor: Tom Bolton (Partner/Executive Editor)
- Founded: October 16, 2007; 19 years ago
- Language: English
- Headquarters: 23 Hitchcock Way #103; Santa Barbara, California
- Website: www.noozhawk.com

Noozhawk is an online newspaper that provides coverage for Santa Barbara County, California. While initially focused on the greater Santa Barbara area, Noozhawk expanded its coverage to the northern part of the county in the summer of 2014. It gained further potential audience with the July 2023 bankruptcy of the Santa Barbara News-Press.

== History ==
In 2012, Noozhawk hired Tom Bolton, a former reporter and editor with the Santa Barbara News-Press and Santa Maria Times, to be executive editor. By the first quarter of 2020, the website was averaging more than 1.8 million page views per month, according to Quantcast.
