= Santa Barbara Daily Sound =

Defunct daily newspaper in Santa Barbara, California

- Type: Daily Newspaper
- Format: Tabloid
- Owner: NODROG Publications
- Founder: Jeramy Gordon
- Founded: March 23, 2006
- Ceased publication: July 23, 2012
- Language: English
- Headquarters: 411 E. Canon Perdido St. #2; Santa Barbara, CA 93101; United States
- Website: thedailysound.com

The Santa Barbara Daily Sound was a free daily newspaper in Santa Barbara, California, published from 2006 to 2012.

== History ==
In March 2006, 23-year-old Jeramy Gordon founded the Santa Barbara Daily Sound two months after moving to Santa Barbara, California. He previously worked at Palo Alto Daily News as managing editor. The paper had three employees, and was disturbed for free five days a week from racks at local businesses. In January 2008, co-publisher Charles Swegles left the paper.

In late June 2012, the publication discontinued its print edition and went digital only. On July 23, 2012 the website of the Daily Sound went offline and apparently it has ceased to operate. Around this time Gordon posted on Craigslist he was selling office supplies.

== Legal issues ==
Less than four months after publishing its first edition, the Santa Barbara Daily Sound received a letter from David Millstein, a San Francisco-based lawyer for the Santa Barbara News-Press, claiming that the Daily Sound's banner looked too much like the News-Press' and that it had to be changed. Publisher Jeramy Gordon said that not only did the News-Press attorney demand a change in the look of the Daily Sound banner, but asked that it consider a name change, perhaps to the Los Angeles Daily Sound.

In late June and early July 2007, Santa Barbara County Public Defender Karen Atkins issues three subpoenas to Daily Sound employees, including Gordon, demanding they turn over all photographs in the paper's possession depicting a March 14, 2007 gang melee that left a 15-year-old dead and 14-year-old charged with his murder. The Daily Sound refused to hand over the photos citing the First Amendment and California's Shield Law, but eventually gave in amid growing legal costs and possible fines that would likely shut down the paper.
