= Graphic Communications Conference =

- Abbreviation: GCC
- Predecessor: Graphic Communications International Union
- Successor: Printing, Packaging & Production Workers Union of North America
- Formation: January 1, 2005
- Dissolved: 2024
- Merger of: International Association of Machinists and Aerospace Workers
- Locations: Quebec; United States
- Members: 30,958 ("active" members); 36,848 ("honorary" members); (2014)
- Parent organization: International Brotherhood of Teamsters
- Website: teamster.org/divisions/graphic-communications-conference

The Graphic Communications Conference (GCC) was an International Brotherhood of Teamsters–affiliated union which represented more than 60,000 workers in all craft and skill areas in the printing and publishing industry. The conference dissolved in 2023 and was succeeded by the Printing, Packaging & Production Workers Union of North America.

== Composition ==
According to GCC's Department of Labor records since 2006, when membership classifications were first reported, the "active" membership of the union has fallen from 60% to 45%. The other—now 55%—half of the union's membership are classified as "honorary", and are described as retirees who pay no dues and are ineligible to vote in the union. GCC contracts also cover some non-members, known as agency fee payers, which since 2006 have numbered comparatively less than a percent of the size of the union's membership, or about 100 non-members paying agency fees.

== History ==
The conference was created after the Graphic Communications International Union (GCIU) voted to join forces with Teamsters in late 2004.

The conference disaffiliated with the Teamsters in 2023, after a consolidation dispute with Teamsters President, Sean O'Brien. After federal judgement in 2024, the conference was allowed to dissolve and locals were then reorganised as the Printing, Packaging & Production Workers Union of North America (PPPWU), becoming an autonomous component of the International Association of Machinists and Aerospace Workers.

The Graphic Communications Conference of the International Brotherhood of Teamsters, Local 767M, was the successor union of several merged printers' locals spanning back into the late 1800s. The local unions have been affiliated with different international unions over time.

Total membership (US records)
View chart definition.
Finances (US records; ×$1000)
View chart definition.

== See also ==
- Santa Barbara News-Press controversy

== Archives ==
- Graphic Communications International Union, Local 767M records. 1908-2009. 15.38 cubic feet (16 boxes). At the Labor Archives of Washington, University of Washington Libraries Special Collections.
