= San Roque, Santa Barbara, California =

Neighborhood in Santa Barbara, California

Coordinates: 34.4442°N 119.7309°W

San Roque (Spanish for "Saint Roch") is a primarily residential neighborhood in Santa Barbara, California, located northwest of downtown. For planning purposes, the City of Santa Barbara uses two designations for this area, San Roque and East San Roque. The area takes its name from San Roque creek, which was named by early Spanish settlers after Saint Roch.

A rural farming area until the 20th century, San Roque's first residential subdivision was developed in 1917 by Stephen Rutherford and called Rutherford Park. The streets were laid out in an irregular grid transected by spokes from a central circular street, Argonne Circle. Argonne Circle was named in memory of Rutherford's son, Lawrie, who died in the Meuse–Argonne offensive. In 1926, plans were approved for the San Roque Country Club and golf course to occupy much of the area adjacent to Rutherford Park, but development stalled due to the Great Depression and in 1939 portions of the unbuilt golf course land were donated to the city of Santa Barbara to become San Roque Park and Stevens Park. In 1928, Peabody Elementary School was built in San Roque in response to population growth, and in 1937 the parochial San Roque School was established. Between 1945 and 1970, residential development filled in the remaining unbuilt lots, and commercial development spread along State Street bordering San Roque.
