= Santa Barbara News-Press controversy =

Controversy over newspaper neutrality and credibility

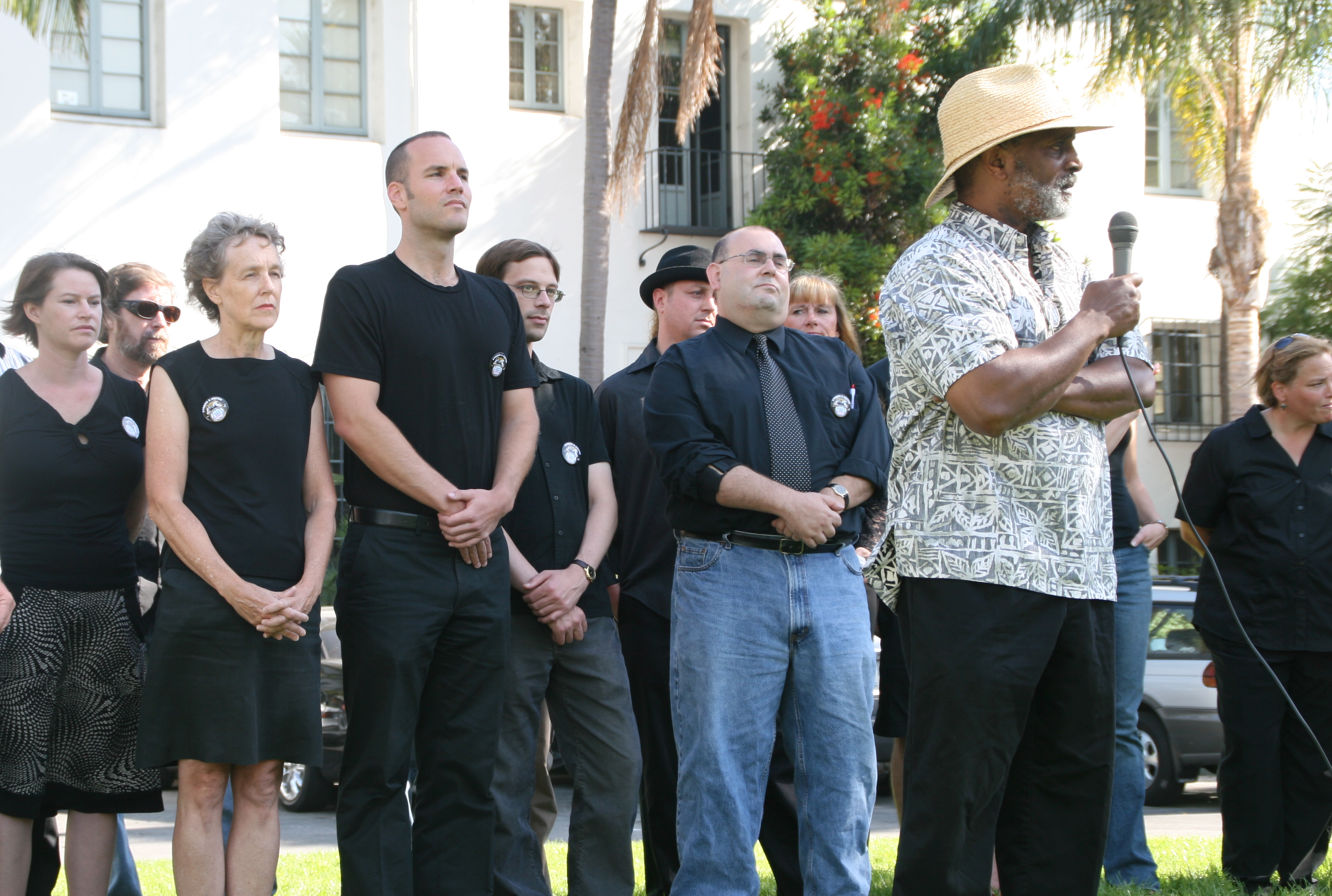
Supporters of the newsroom staff, here Cedric Robinson, a UCSB political science and black studies professor, spoke at public rallies.

The Santa Barbara News-Press controversy refers to a series of events starting after businesswoman Wendy P. McCaw bought the Santa Barbara News-Press from The New York Times Company in 2000. McCaw proceeded to oversee some of the newspaper's content, and some news editors and reporters felt her intervention compromised the paper's neutrality and credibility. The tensions came to a head on July 6, 2006, when five editors and a columnist resigned.

They and three others staffers later received an "Ethics in Journalism" award from the Society of Professional Journalists, and the entire editorial staff was awarded the Payne Award for Ethics in Journalism as a result of their actions in the dispute.

The controversy led to at least three civil suits and one criminal investigation, as well as to the successful unionization of the editorial workers at the Santa Barbara, California, newspaper.

== The July 6, 2006, incident ==
In the five years after McCaw bought the newspaper from the New York Times Company, five publishers and several editors resigned or were fired. Newsroom employees complained that McCaw unduly influenced reporting of the news, while she contended that the supervision of content was her responsibility as owner.

On July 6, 2006, five newsroom employees resigned, blaming McCaw's interference with editorial news judgment. They were Editor Jerry Roberts, columnist Barney Brantingham, managing editor George Foulsham, deputy managing editor Don Murphy, business editor Michael Todd and metro editor Jane Hulse. Roberts was escorted out of the building by the then-acting publisher Travis K. Armstrong. McCaw's perspective was that the editors had allowed an intolerable level of personal opinion and agendas to influence their editorial choices.

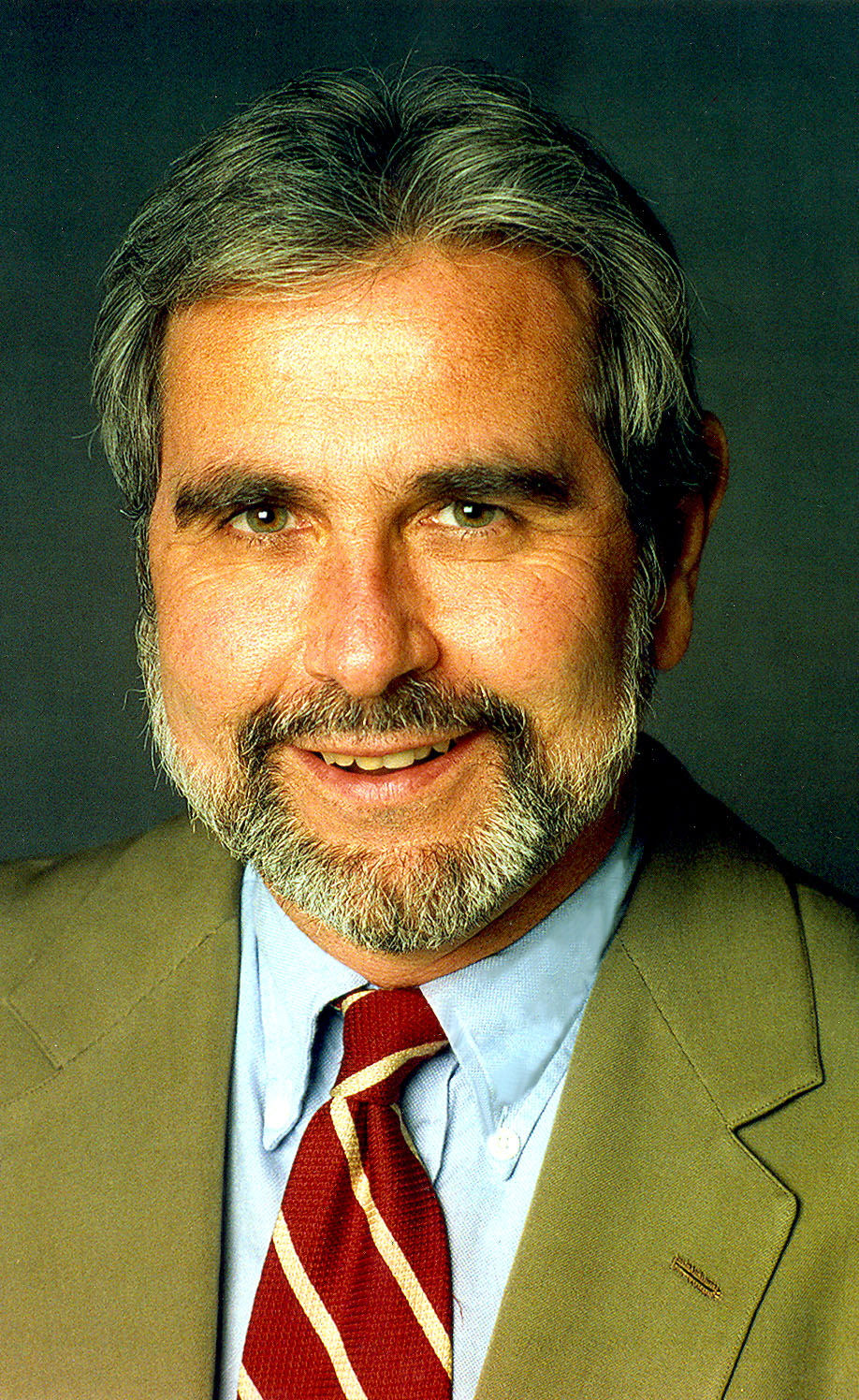
Editor Jerry Roberts, 1990's.

The proximate cause of the controversy included McCaw's intervention to halt the publication of a story about the drunk driving conviction of acting publisher Armstrong. Another dispute involved her reprimand of a reporter and three editors for publishing the address where actor Rob Lowe planned to build a "dream home."

== Countermeasures ==
Around 60 non-newsroom workers put their names to a full-page advertisement in the News-Press on February 14, 2007, in which they thanked McCaw and expressed their frustration with what they called the anti–News-Press actions of ex–newsroom staff and others.

Conservative radio talk show host Laura Schlessinger, a resident of neighboring Montecito, was hired to replace Brantingham as a twice-weekly columnist in July 2006.

== Subsequent separations ==
Three major waves of firings or resignations followed, as did a slow erosion of employees. Five columnists who wrote about local communities or issues were let go in mid-August 2006, and columnist Starshine Roshell resigned after her column was canceled. In September, mental health columnist Dr. Michael Seabaugh resigned, after the News-Press published an apology for a critical column he wrote about Schlessinger.

Many firings occurred within the context of employees' attempts to unionize after the July 6, 2006, incident (see below section on unionization). Six reporters, Dawn Hobbs, Rob Kuznia, Barney McManigal, John Zant, Tom Schultz and Melissa Evans, were fired by the News-Press on February 5–6, 2007, for participating in a freeway overpass demonstration. They had displayed a large sign reading "Cancel Your Newspaper Today" during morning rush hour on February 2.

McCaw held that the editors and reporters who quit did not want goals to improve the quality of the paper, to have accurate unbiased reporting, and more local stories that readers want to read. She said they no longer would be permitted to flavor the news with their personal opinions.

== Unionization ==
A unionization effort was launched after the July 6 incident, and those in favor of joining the Graphic Communications Conference of the International Brotherhood of Teamsters garnered a 33–6 (85%) victory in a vote conducted by the National Labor Relations Board on September 27, 2006. In August 2007, the labor board certified the union as the exclusive bargaining representative of the news department employees.

== Lawsuits ==
=== Breach of contract ===
In August, 2006, McCaw's holding company, Ampersand, sued former editor Roberts for breach of contract and causing damage to the News-Press; it demanded $25 million in damages. The company charged that Roberts breached confidentiality concerning the suit, which was subject to a compromise, but Roberts answered that it was an Ampersand attorney who gave the information to a News-Press reporter and that the story was leaked from there.

Roberts filed a counterclaim for $10 million, and Ampersand responded by increasing its claim to $25 million. Roberts accepted a position at the University of California, Santa Barbara, as publication director.

=== Santa Barbara Independent ===
Ampersand sued the weekly Santa Barbara Independent in federal court on October 26, 2006, claiming that the posting of an unpublished draft article by a recently fired News-Press staffer constituted copyright infringement. Ampersand also alleged misappropriation of its trade secrets by acquiring and publishing the draft and by acquiring another draft News-Press article relating to the paper's arbitration proceeding against a former editor. Ampersand also brought claims for unfair competition, intentional interference with prospective economic advantage and contract, and negligent interference with prospective economic advantage and contract. The Independent had posted a copy of a story written by News-Press reporter Scott Hadly about the July 6, 2006, events. The News-Press chose not to publish the story, and a copy was leaked to the Independent, which posted the article on its website. Ampersand requested the removal of the story, and the Independent complied. The October 26 suit concerned the few days when the leaked story had been posted and also identified a second unpublished News-Press story about Ampersand's suit against Roberts.

In November 2007 the trial judge Edward Rafeedie granted Ampersand summary judgment on its copyright infringement claim, holding that the posting of the draft article was not fair use. The judge dismissed Ampersand's trade-secret claim. He reserved decision on the trade-secret claim relating to the arbitration article, pending resolution of Ampersand's motion to compel the writer to answer questions about his source of information. The judge also dismissed the unfair competition and tortious interference claims, stating that they were preempted by federal copyright law and the California Uniform Trade Secrets Act.

Eventually the parties settled the case: The Independent agreed not to challenge the court's ruling that it had violated federal copyright law. The financial terms were not made public.

=== Susan Paterno ===
Ampersand filed suit on December 12, 2006, against Chapman University Professor Susan Paterno, author of the article "Santa Barbara Smackdown" that appeared in the American Journalism Review. The suit alleged 33 instances of false and misleading statements, claimed that Paterno's "article falsely states and implies that Ampersand is an unethical corporate entity engaged in unlawful conduct and that its product, the Santa Barbara News-Press, is a deficient product" and asserted that McCaw's involvement in the News-Press resulted from former editor Roberts' incompetence. Attorneys for the American Journalism Review responded to the suit on December 27, 2006. Paterno filed an anti-SLAPP suit against Ampersand on January 29, 2007.

On February 15, 2007, nearly all copies of the Chapman University student newspaper, the Panther, were stolen from campus racks. That edition of the Panther contained an in-depth article on Paterno's article and her legal troubles.

The first hearing on Paterno's suit took place in April 2007, when the judge allowed limited discovery of evidence to go forward on four of the charges. Paterno filed for a writ of mandamus to prevent discovery being pursued against her on the four remaining libel charges, and in June 2008 the Court of Appeal in Santa Ana granted her the writ and ordered the case dismissed. The News-Press was compelled to pay Paterno's attorney fees.

== Legal letters ==
McCaw's lawyer, A. Barry Cappello, sent a letter to 44 attorneys in the Santa Barbara area on September 11, 2006, urging them not to provide legal support for former News-Press employees. On September 22, 2006, the 44 attorneys announced formation of the Lawyers Alliance for Free Speech Rights to help ensure equal access to justice "for journalists who assert that they are exercising their free speech rights under the First Amendment." The group was denounced by the News-Press in a press release. On December 5, 2006, Cappello followed up with a second letter urging attorneys not to support former News-Press employees. On January 23, 2007, the attorney sent another letter to lawyers in the Alliance.

During the week of December 11, 2006, McCaw's attorney sent a letter to seven small Santa Barbara businesses, all of which had displayed signs reading "McCaw Obey the Law." The letter threatened action for defamation, stating that the sign exposed McCaw to "hatred, contempt, and ridicule." The American Civil Liberties Union of Southern California responded with a letter expressing the opinion that legal action against the small business owners would fail.

A letter from Capello was published in the Independent in January 2007, in which the attorney framed the controversy as a battle between the Teamsters and the business owner, McCaw. He also claimed that McCaw had saved the News-Press from financial insolvency; this claim was contested in a subsequent letter by Randy Alcorn, a former News-Press financial officer.

== Child pornography investigation ==
On April 22, 2007, the News-Press published a front-page article stating that the Santa Barbara Police Department had viewed nearly 15,000 pornographic images on a company computer hard drive once used by former editor Roberts, some of which amounted to child pornography. Roberts described the article as "a smear" and said that the News-Press published the piece without a byline and without seeking a comment from him. He also demanded an immediate retraction and said he might pursue "massive damages."

The News-Press published a front-page clarification about the April 22 article on May 13, 2007. Two rewordings urged by Roberts' attorneys were printed. The first concerned use of the computer by other News-Press editors: The April 22 article stated that computer systems director Raul Gil had signed a declaration that the computer may have been used by other editors. The May 13 clarification stated specifically that Gil had concluded "by recollection, notes, and memory" that the desktop computer had been previously used by at least two other editors at the News-Press and "possibly an ex-business editor." A second clarification concerned Roberts' interaction with Santa Barbara Police: In the April 22 article, the News-Press reported that Roberts "refused" to be interviewed by police, while the May 13 clarification stated that Roberts cooperated through his wife and attorneys. Roberts' attorney deemed the clarification inadequate.

Veteran journalist Lou Cannon, a resident of the area, wrote an opinion piece in the Los Angeles Times on May 13, 2007, lamenting the treatment of Roberts and the controversy at the News-Press. Owner McCaw responded in her own paper on May 27, 2007, and in the L.A. Times on May 31, 2007: She accused Cannon of sloppy journalism as well as a lack of sensitivity toward victims of child pornography. Cannon countered McCaw's response by questioning the accuracy of a number of her claims. Roberts responded in the Times as well, on June 5, 2007. A subsequent public written exchange between McCaw and Cannon took place in early July 2007.

A judge did enjoin the Santa Barbara Police Department from destroying the information on the hard drive for 120 days. During oral argument, the Ampersand attorney stated that the drive was "our defense to emotional distress damages", referring to Roberts' counterclaim.

== Circulation ==
The publishers reported that circulation increased during the commotion. Figures provided to prospective advertisers indicated a decline in South Santa Barbara County subscriptions during 2006 from 31,000 in January to 27,000 in June. Total circulation figures dropped by approximately 2,000 readers, or about 5 percent, between fall 2005 and fall 2006. Between spring 2006 and spring 2007, News-Press weekday circulation fell 9.5 percent, one of the biggest declines in the Southern California region. Readership for the Santa Maria Times, the major daily newspaper of northern Santa Barbara County, increased by 6 percent during the same period.

== Public response ==
Roberts, Foulsham, Murphy, sports editor Gerry Spratt, business editor Michael Todd, Hulse, presentation editor Colin Powers, reporter Scott Hadly and Brantingham received an "Ethics in Journalism" award from the Society of Professional Journalists on August 11, 2006. McCaw argued in a letter that the Society was being "used by this group to further their own political and personal agendas."

The entire editorial staff was awarded the Payne Award for Ethics in Journalism given at the University of Oregon in spring 2007.

== Documentary ==
In 2008, filmmaker Sam Tyler released Citizen McCaw, an 85-minute documentary focusing on the News-Press controversy.
