= Santa Barbara News-Press =

Newspaper in Santa Barbara, California

Coordinates: 34.41962°N 119.69812°W

- Type: Online newspaper
- Owner: NEWSWELL (Arizona State University)
- Publisher: William Belfiore
- Editor: Joshua Molina
- Founded: May 30, 1868
- Ceased publication: July 21, 2023
- Relaunched: January 22, 2025
- Headquarters: 715 Anacapa Street; Santa Barbara, California, U.S. (formerly)
- OCLC number: 8769683
- Website: newspress.com

The Santa Barbara News-Press is an American daily online newspaper based in Santa Barbara, California. Founded in 1868 as the Post, it was renamed the Press before ultimately merging with its rival News to form the News-Press in 1932. Formerly a daily broadsheet newspaper, the paper ceased printing and entered bankruptcy in 2023. Following purchase of the Santa Barbara News-Press assets out of bankruptcy, it relaunched in 2025 with backing from NEWSWELL, a non-profit that provides support to local news outlets.

== History ==
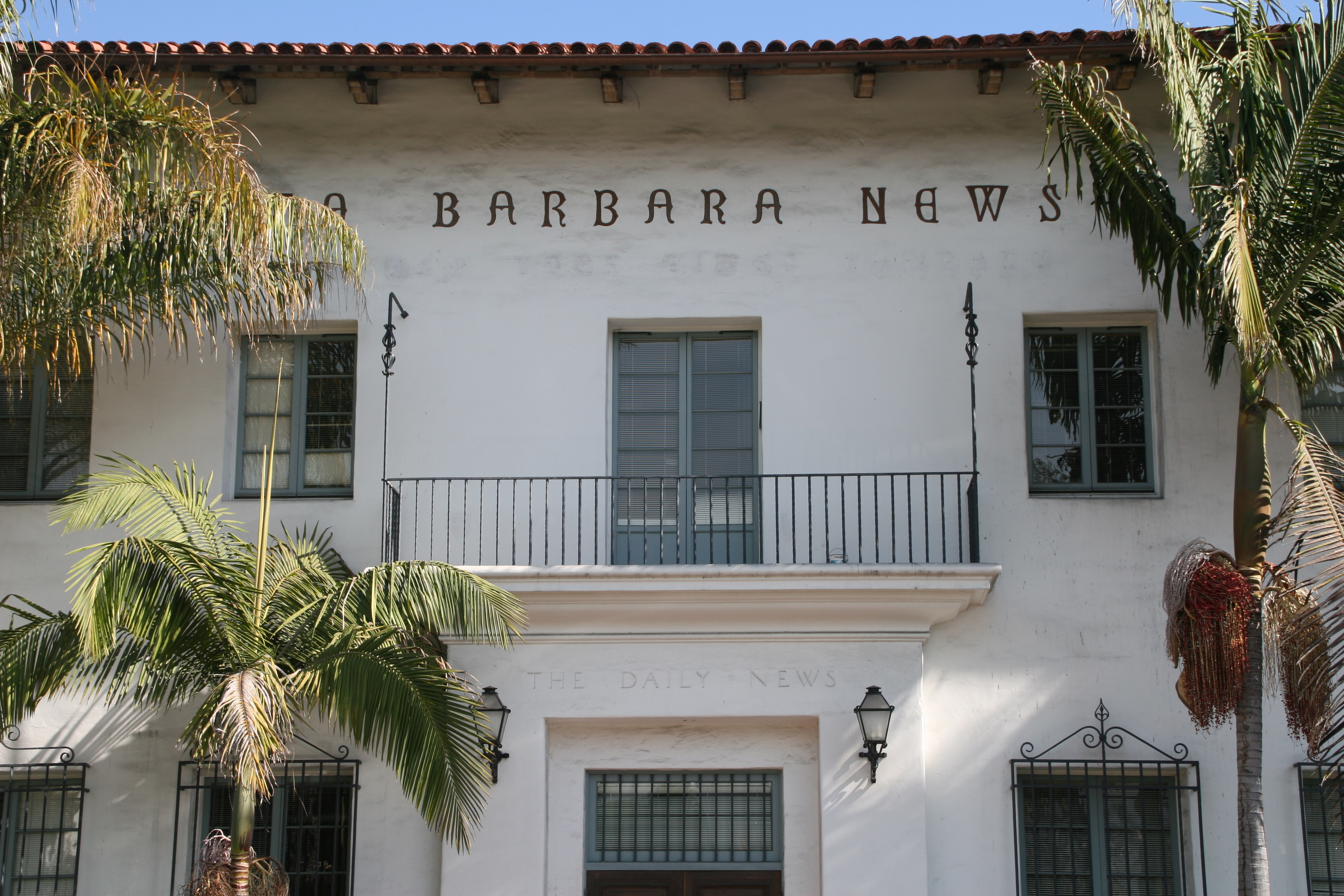
The face of the News-Press building in De La Guerra Plaza.

E. B Boust first published the Santa Barbara Post on May 30, 1868. A year later, Reverend James Ashbury Johnson became the sole owner and immediately changed the name to the Santa Barbara Press. Years later Johnson was assaulted and badly beaten by Mayor Jarrett T. Richards on Election Day. The paper's following owners were Harrison Gray Otis and then J. P. Stearns, who employed Theodore Glancey to work as the paper's editor.

In 1880, Glancey was fatally shot by Clarance Gray. Gray was a Republican running for district attorney and attacked Glancey for calling him a hoodlum and a lawbreaker in his paper. Charles Fayette McGlashan, formerly of the Truckee Republican, replaced Glancey as editor and bought the Press in 1881. He later sold it to W. G. Kinsell. In 1887, Kinsell sold the Press to Press Publishing Co., headed by Walter H. Nixon. He sold it five years later to J. T. Johnson and George Knepper. Johnson retired and was replaced by Charles McDevitt, who also later retired. In 1896, the Santa Barbara Morning Press was sold for $50,000 to a stock company called Press Publishing and Printing Company, with S. Howard Martin serving as company president and managing editor.

The Morning Press was acquired in 1932 by Thomas M. Storke who merged with his paper, the Santa Barbara Daily News (possibly dating back to 1855 (Note: The claim of a founding date of 1855 rests upon a person named B. W. Keep who founded the Santa Barbara Gazette in 1855 and left the news business in 1858 or 1861, but then returned to the business when he helped found the Santa Barbara Democrat in 1878. The Democrat is one of the predecessors of the Santa Barbara News, which merged with the Press in 1932.) to create the Santa Barbara News-Press. Storke, a prominent local rancher and booster descended from the Spanish founders of Santa Barbara, brought the paper to prominence. For many years his father, Charles A. Storke, ran the editorial page; his son, Charles A. Storke II, oversaw operations between 1932 and 1960. In 1962, T. M. Storke won the Pulitzer Prize for Editorial Writing "for his forceful editorials calling public attention to the activities of a semi-secret organization known as the John Birch Society".

Storke sold the paper in 1964 to Robert McLean, owner of the Philadelphia Bulletin, who turned over publishing of the News-Press to one of his nephews, Stuart S. Taylor, father of writer Stuart Taylor, Jr. Under Stuart S. Taylor's tutelage news writers flourished, including Dick Smith, Walker Tompkins, and others. The nearby Dick Smith Wilderness Area was named for Smith, a noted environmentalist. Larry Pidgeon was a well-known editorial writer for the paper. The paper was sold to The New York Times in 1985. In 2000, the paper was bought by Wendy P. McCaw, an ex-wife of billionaire Craig McCaw.

=== McCaw–newsroom dispute ===
In early summer 2006, six editors and a long-time columnist suddenly resigned. The group cited the imposition of McCaw and her managers' personal opinions onto the process of reporting and publishing the news; McCaw expressed the view that the News-Press newsroom staff had become sloppy and biased. Tensions had existed between McCaw and the newsroom since she bought the News-Press in 2000.

Between July 2006 and February 2007, 60 staff (out of 200 total employees), including all but two news reporters, resigned or were fired from the News-Press. Newsroom employees voted to unionize with the Teamsters, and both the News-Press management and the Teamsters made multiple appeals to the National Labor Relations Board. Former employees have encouraged subscribers to cancel their subscriptions to the News-Press, and have encouraged advertisers to cease advertising in the paper. McCaw's attorneys filed lawsuits against former employees, journalists, as well as competing newspapers, and issued numerous cease and desist letters, to websites linking to the News-Press website, to local business that display signs in support of former employees, and to former employees who speak to the local media.

The parent company of the News-Press, Ampersand Publishing, filed a copyright infringement suit on November 9, 2006, against the Santa Barbara Independent ("SBI")—where many former News-Press columnists had become contributors to the community weekly—claiming that a link on independent.com violated copyright law. The case never reached trial, as an undisclosed settlement was reached on April 28, 2008, resulting in a dismissal at the request of the parties.

=== Decline, bankruptcy and closure ===
The newsroom was reduced from 65 employees to 20 by 2016. That same year, the News-Press was among the first newspapers to endorse Donald Trump's campaign for president. McCaw authored several right-wing editorials during the following years, including criticism of social distancing rules during the COVID-19 pandemic. The newspaper's printed edition was later reduced to four pages before being eliminated entirely.

On July 21, 2023, the Santa Barbara News-Press' owner, Ampersand Publishing LLC, filed for Chapter 7 bankruptcy liquidation. The July 21 edition of the paper was the last as Wendy McCaw said all jobs were eliminated and the business had no money to issue final paychecks. The filing noted $50,000 in assets and between $1 million and $10 million in liabilities. Not long before the bankruptcy, the publication closed its historic Santa Barbara newsroom and moved all operations to its printing facility in Goleta before stopping printing operations in June and going online-only.

In March 2024, with a tentative bankruptcy sale for $250,000 to Weyaweya Ltd., a Maltese company, the court scheduled a final bidding opportunity for April 9; bidding started at $260,000 in $5,000 increments and sale included the domain names, website contents and social media accounts. Two former employees expected to be paid a combined $15,000 for website logins and backups. The winning bid at $285,000 was from a group managed by Ben Romo, which formed a week before the auction. The paper's historical archives, including newspapers bound into books dating back to 1870, were sold for $70,000 in another auction to the Santa Barbara Historical Museum.

=== Relaunch ===
Romo donated the News-Press' intellectual property to NEWSWELL, a nonprofit affiliated with the Walter Cronkite School of Journalism and Mass Communication. In January 2025, NEWSWELL announced the relaunch the News-Press as a digital newspaper.

== See also ==
- Santa Barbara Independent
- Santa Barbara Daily Sound
- History of Santa Barbara, California
- Labor relations at the Santa Barbara News-Press
