= Lake Los Carneros =

Reservoir and nature preserve in Goleta, California

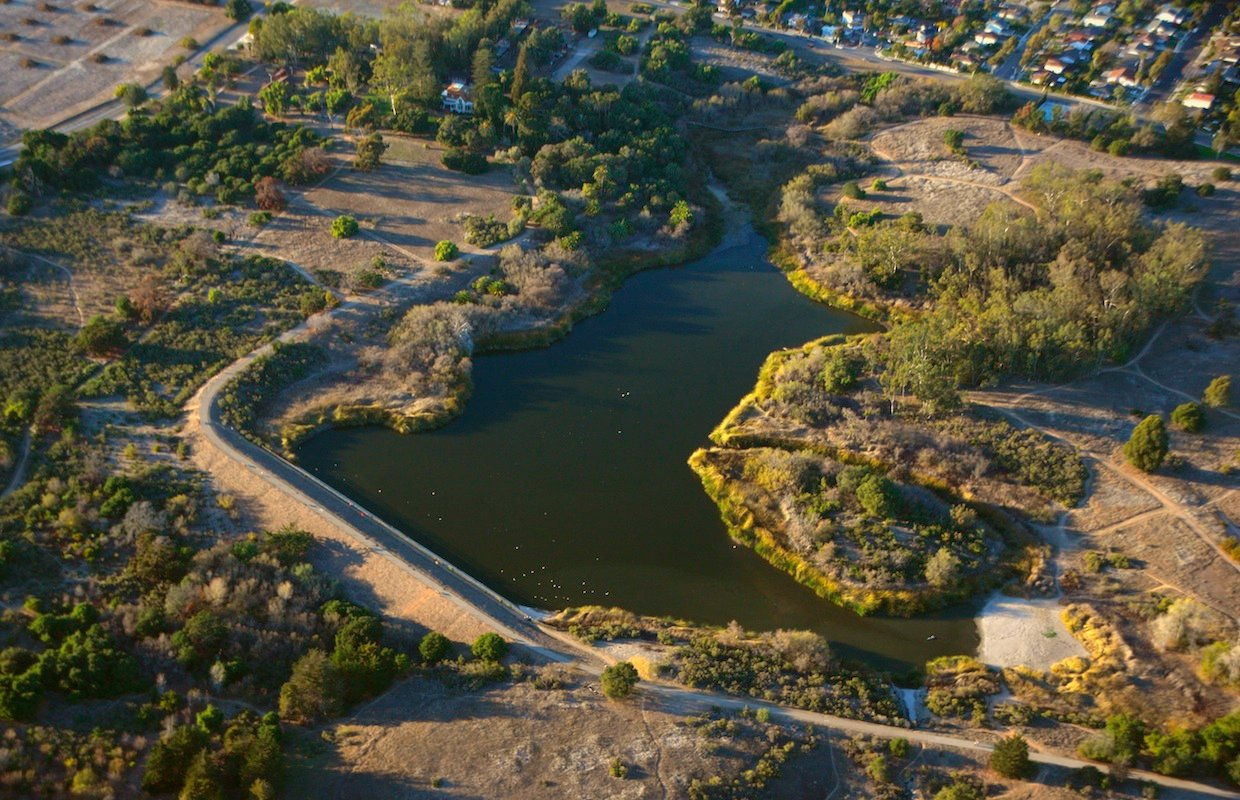
- Aerial view of Lake Los Carneros with the Stow House and the Goleta Depot visible top left.
- Interactive map of Lake Los Carneros
- Location: Goleta, California
- Coordinates: 34°26′30″N 119°50′55″W
- Type: Reservoir
- Etymology: Spanish carneros, "rams" or "sheep"
- Built: 1873 (dam built); 1932 (enlarged)
- Surface area: About 25 acres (10 ha)
- Surface elevation: 48 feet (15 m) (when full)

Lake Los Carneros is a small reservoir in Goleta, California, at the center of the city-owned Lake Los Carneros Natural and Historical Preserve. The preserve covers about 140 acres (57 ha) of open space between Los Carneros Road and the hills north of U.S. Route 101. The lake began as a small natural wetland on the La Patera ranch of the Stow family. Sherman Stow dammed it in 1873, and his son Edgar enlarged it in 1932. It was the source of the earliest commercial irrigation in the Goleta Valley. Santa Barbara County acquired the land for a public park between 1964 and 1975, and the preserve is now managed by the City of Goleta for passive recreation and wildlife habitat. It is one of the best-known birding sites in Santa Barbara County with more than 270 species recorded. The historic Stow House and the Goleta Depot of the South Coast Railroad Museum stand at the preserve's southern edge.

== History ==
The lake traces its origin back to the 1840s when a place called Los Carneros, Spanish for "the rams" or "the sheep", appears on the 1842 diseño (land grant map) of Rancho Dos Pueblos. An arroyo (creek) of that name appears on the 1846 diseño of Rancho La Goleta. The name survives in Carneros Creek, which flows past the west side of the preserve, and in Los Carneros Road.

In 1871, William Whitney Stow, a lawyer for the Southern Pacific Railroad in San Francisco, bought 1,043 acres (422 ha) of the former Rancho La Goleta for his son, Sherman P. Stow. Sherman built the Carpenter Gothic Stow House on the property and moved there in 1873 with his wife, Ida Hollister. The family planted 3,000 lemon trees in 1875 which the Goleta Valley Historical Society describes as the first commercial lemon orchard in California.

The lake started as a small natural wetland. In 1873, Sherman Stow built a 6-foot (1.8 m) earthen dam that doubled its storage capacity. The pond, then known as Stow Lake or Stow Pond, was the first commercial irrigation project in the area. Stow had diverted water to it after a dispute over water rights. In 1932, Sherman's son, state senator Edgar Whitney Stow, raised the dam to 19 feet (5.8 m) and built its concrete section. One local history record dates the completion of the new dam and lake to 1938. The dam was raised again in later years and when full, the lake now stands at 48 feet (15 m) above sea level.

=== Public park ===
The Stow family gave Stow Grove to Santa Barbara County as a public park in 1964. In 1967, when the county bought about three acres around the Stow House, the heirs donated the house itself. In 1975, the county bought the remaining 136 acres (55 ha), including the lake, from Boise Cascade for $1.25 million, mostly in state funds. Local residents insisted that the whole area be kept in its natural condition rather than developed as a conventional park.

In 1981, the 1901 Southern Pacific depot from Goleta was moved to the park. It reopened in 1982 as the Goleta Depot, now home to the South Coast Railroad Museum. The Stow House is the headquarters of the Goleta Valley Historical Society and was listed on the National Register of Historic Places in 2000.

The preserve is now one of three city-owned regional open space preserves along with the Sperling Preserve and Santa Barbara Shores Park. The city's General Plan describes them as available for passive recreation only.

=== Drought and recovery ===
During the drought of the 2010s and early 2020s, the lake dropped to low levels and the Goleta Water District helped the city aerate the remaining water to protect wildlife. After more than 28 inches (71 cm) of rain in the winter of 2022–2023, the city announced in March 2023 that the lake was full for the first time since 2011.

== Wildlife ==
The lake, its marshes of tule and the surrounding grassland and woodland support a wide range of birds. Records from eBird list up to 271 species over the course of a year. Northern shovelers are common in winter along with teal, ring-necked ducks and gadwall. Pied-billed grebes live on the lake year-round, and American coots are commonly seen as well. In winter, the lake is known as one of the best places in the county to look for American and least bitterns. Over the years, both coyotes and bobcats have been seen from the trails around the lake.

The earthen dam draws the most birds since shorebirds visit from the coast about 2 miles (3.2 km) away. The Santa Barbara Audubon Society leads regular bird walks at the lake and holds a Winter Bird Count for Kids there each January.

Dragonfly

Squirrel

Coyote

Owl

American Kestrel

Hooded oriole

== See also ==
- Stow House
- Goleta Depot
- South Coast Railroad Museum
- Carneros Creek (Santa Barbara County, California)
- La Patera, California
- Rancho La Goleta
- Goleta Slough
