= La Patera, California =

Unincorporated community in California, United States

La Patera
- Unincorporated community
- Etymology: Spanish for "The Place of Ducks"
- Interactive map of La Patera
- Coordinates: 34°26′15″N 119°50′32″W
- Country: United States
- State: California
- County: Santa Barbara
- Time zone: UTC-8 (Pacific (PST))
  - Summer (DST): UTC-7 (Pacific Daylight Time (PDT))

La Patera (Spanish for "The Place of Ducks") was a historical locale within what is now the city of Goleta, California, United States. Part of the area has been preserved as Lake Los Carneros, which includes the historic Stow House.

Prior to European settlement, the area was inhabited by the Chumash, who had a settlement in the area named Saspilil. The Portolá expedition reached the area in August 1769 and gave it the name Laguna, but this was later changed to La Patera owing to the abundant ducks inhabiting the area's wetlands.

According to Yda Addis Storke's Memorial and Biographical History of the Counties of Santa Barbara, San Luis Obispo and Ventura, California (1891), the name La Patera referred to an area of the Goleta valley west of Santa Barbara, and formed a wetlands on the north edge of the Goleta Slough (which was much larger at that time). The La Patera area was within a Mexican land grant called Rancho La Goleta, 4,440 acres. Adjacent to the south was Rancho Las Positas y La Calera, while adjacent to the west was Rancho Dos Pueblos, 15,535 acres.

When the Stow family acquired the former land grant rancho, they changed its name to Rancho La Patera. A remnant of that ranch, to the northwest of the Stow house, retains the name. When the residential neighborhood to the east of the lake was developed, it was given the name La Patera. North La Patera Lane is a street at the edge of that neighborhood, where it borders the undeveloped lake area.

== See also ==
- Tompkins, Walker A. (1983). Fourteen at the table : an informal history of the life and good times of the Sexton family of Old Goleta. ISBN 978-0-911773-02-6.
- Tompkins, Walker A. (1966). Goleta: The Good Land.
