= Carneros Creek (Santa Barbara County, California) =

Carneros Creek Camerus Valley Creek
- Location of the mouth in California

Location
- Country: United States
- State: California
- Region: Santa Barbara County, California
- City: Goleta

Physical characteristics
- Source: Brush Peak, Santa Ynez Mountains
  - coordinates: 34°30′00″N 119°51′25″W
  - elevation: 2,710 ft (830 m)
- Mouth: Goleta Slough
  - location: Goleta, California
  - coordinates: 34°25′01″N 119°49′49″W
  - elevation: 7 ft (2.1 m)

Basin features
- Tributaries
  - right: Dry Creek, Tecolotito Creek

Carneros Creek is a southward flowing stream originating in the Santa Ynez Mountains, in Santa Barbara County, California. It flows to Lake Los Carneros Park, under U. S. Highway 101 where it runs in a man-made channel diverted to the west of Santa Barbara Municipal Airport, until it meets Goleta Slough, from whence its waters flow to the Santa Barbara Channel of the Pacific Ocean.

== History ==
A place named Los Carneros, which is Spanish for "sheep", is shown on the 1842 diseño of the Rancho Dos Pueblos Mexican land grant, and as an arroyo on the 1846 diseño of Rancho La Goleta.

== Watershed ==
The Carneros Creek official mainstem is 7.6 miles (12.2 km) long. It drains a watershed of 5.6 square miles (15 km^{2}) and its Tecolotito Creek tributary drains the 5.8 square miles (15 km^{2}) Glen Annie Canyon watershed. It drops rapidly from its source just south of the crest of the Santa Ynez Mountains through Bartlett Canyon in the Los Padres National Forest. After crossing the Tecolote Aqueduct and being joined by Dry Creek on the right (headed downstream), Carneros Creek becomes low gradient. As it passes to the west of Lake Los Carneros Park, it crosses beneath U.S. Highway 101 where it enters the Los Carneros Wetlands and is diverted to the west of the Santa Barbara Municipal Airport. The Wetlands are located south of Highway 101 and north of Hollister Avenue and are a remnant of a large area that was once a part of the Goleta Slough. Carneros is estuarine from its mouth at the eastern end of Goleta Slough up to Hollister Avenue. Below Hollister Avenue, Carneros Creek is joined by Tecolotito Creek (Glen Annie Creek) (on the right) at the northwestern end of the slough. Before entering the Pacific Ocean at the east end of Goleta Slough, the waters of Carneros Creek are joined by San Pedro Creek and Atascadero Creek.

== Recreation ==
Lake Los Carneros is a man-made historic duck pond with easy walking trails and birdwatching. The area includes the historic Stow House.
