= Charles H. Jackson Jr. =

American rancher, investor, and polo player

Charles Hervey Jackson Jr.
- Born: April 12, 1898
- Died: May 26, 1978 (aged 80)
- Resting place: Santa Barbara Cemetery, Santa Barbara, Santa Barbara Co., California
- Occupations: Rancher, investor, polo player
- Spouse: Ann Gavit
- Relatives: Chester A. Arthur (great-uncle)

Charles Hervey "Pete" Jackson Jr. (1898 - 1978) was an American rancher, investor and polo player.

== Early life ==
Charles H. Jackson Jr. was born on April 12, 1898, and grew up in Albany, New York. He was the grand-nephew of U.S. President Chester A. Arthur.

== Ranching ==
Jackson, briefly a banker, was interested in agriculture and became a rancher when he journeyed west and bought the Alisal ranch in the Santa Ynez Valley at auction in 1943. He built it up as a guest ranch, opening to the public in 1946. For a period of time the ranch was known for attracting celebrity visitors; Clark Gable married Lady Sylvia Ashley there in 1949. Under the management of his son it became more popular as a family destination.

== Equestrian interests ==
Jackson was a co-founder of the Santa Barbara Riding and Hunt Club, in the suburb of Hope Ranch, alongside Amy DuPont, Charles E. Jenkins, Harold S. Chase, Dwight Murphy, C.K.G. Billings, John Mitchell, George Owen Knapp, Peter Cooper Bryce, Col. G. Watson French and F. W. Leadbetter in the 1920s.

He acquired 25 polo ponies from Argentina in 1933.

He was a registered thoroughbred owner through his Silver Creek Farm. His horse Painted Wagon won the inaugural running of the Citation Handicap at Hollywood Park Racetrack in 1977.

== Personal life ==
Jackson married (Marcia) Ann Gavit on September 7, 1926 at Santa Barbara, California. She was an heiress to the Anthony N. Brady fortune, and was described at the time as "Albany's wealthiest girl" and "one of the wealthiest heiresses in America". (Note: It was said that when he asked for permission to marry her, her father said "Everyone will say you are just after her money, so I'll give you a million dollars in your own name and then no one can say that.") They resided in Rancho San Carlos in Montecito, California, a 237-acre (96 ha) estate near Santa Barbara.

In 1958, they acquired part of the old Hammond estate, which was divided up between Wiliam G. Gilmore of Atherton, the President of Gilmore Steel; L.C. Smith, a contractor from San Francisco; and the Jacksons. Some of the old Hammond estate later became Shalawa Meadow, California.

== Death and legacy ==
Jackson died in 1978. His widow died in 1990. Their Rancho San Carlos was inherited by his grandson, Jim Jackson, who listed it for US$125 million in 2014.
