= Rancho San Marcos =

Land grant in California

Coordinates: 34.600°N 119.830°W

Rancho San Marcos was a 35,573-acre (143.96 km^{2}) Mexican land grant in present-day Santa Barbara County, California given in 1846 by Governor Pio Pico to Nicolas A. Den and Richard S. Den. The grant in the Santa Ynez Valley extended between the San Rafael Mountains and the Santa Ynez River.

== History ==
The former Santa Barbara Mission land was granted to the Den brothers, who emigrated from Ireland. Nicolas Den came to Santa Barbara in the 1836 and was also the grantee of Rancho Dos Pueblos. His younger brother Richard Den came to Santa Barbara in 1843, and was a doctor who practiced in the Pueblo de Los Angeles.

With the cession of California to the United States following the Mexican–American War, the 1848 Treaty of Guadalupe Hidalgo provided that the land grants would be honored. As required by the Land Act of 1851, a claim for Rancho San Marcos was filed with the Public Land Commission in 1852, and the grant was patented to Nicolas A. Den and Richard S. Den in 1869.

In 1868 William Pierce bought Rancho San Marcos from the Den brothers’ heirs. Pierce was also the owner of adjoining Rancho Tequepis and Rancho Nojoqui. The businesses were moderately successful.

== Nicolas A. Den ==
Nicolas August Den (1812–1862) was an Irish immigrant who moved to Santa Barbara in 1836. Den who had studied to become a medical doctor in Dublin, and although not yet graduated, he became the first medical doctor in the Santa Barbara area. His brother, Richard, came to Santa Barbara in 1843. While both Den brothers were medical men, Nicolas Den's practice had been put aside in favor of administration of Rancho Dos Pueblos and service as alcalde of Santa Barbara. He also devoted himself to preserving the local mission and establishing a Catholic seminary in Santa Barbara. In later years Nicolas Den was one of the seven organizers of the Society of California Pioneers. He married Rosa A. Hill, a daughter of Daniel A. Hill. He died in 1862, leaving ten children.

== Richard S. Den ==
Richard Somerset Den (1821–1895), a native of County Kilkenny, Ireland, had followed his brother Nicolas, to Santa Barbara in 1843. Richard Den practiced medicine in Los Angeles with the exception of a brief sojourn in 1848–1850 prospecting for gold in Calaveras County, and a decade's absence (1854–1866) to administer Rancho San Marcos, until 1895. Den also aroused a certain awe in his later days as he made his rounds astride a black charger, dressed in black and wearing a black felt hat atop "a clustered mass of wavy hair as white as snow". A participant in the Mexican–American War, Richard S. Den served as the chief physician and surgeon for the Mexican forces. He treated Californios and the American prisoners, including Benjamin D. Wilson and his party captured at the Battle of Chino in 1846.

== Later owners ==
Dwight Murphy, a Santa Barbara businessman, later owned the ranch. Robert Odell, owner of the Santa Barbara Biltmore and the Clift Hotel in San Francisco, bought the ranch from Murphy in 1956. The Odell family developed a golf course on the ranch. Ty Warner purchased the golf course in 2005.

== See also ==
- Ranchos of California
- List of Ranchos of California
- National Register of Historic Places listings in Santa Barbara County, California — includes Rancho San Marcos.
