= Stow House =

Historic house in California, United States

- U.S. National Register of Historic Places
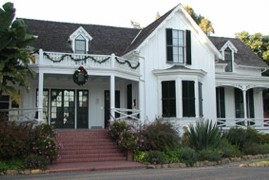
- The Stow House, Goleta, California

- Location within California Location within the United States
- Location: 304 N. Los Carneros Rd., Goleta, California
- Coordinates: 34°26′34″N 119°51′3″W
- Area: less than one acre
- Architectural style: Gothic Revival, Italianate
- NRHP reference No.: 00001166
- Added to NRHP: September 28, 2000

The Stow House is a U.S. historical landmark in Goleta, California, United States. Formerly the headquarters of Rancho La Patera, the Stow House, in the Carpenter Gothic style, is now the headquarters of Goleta Historical Society which preserves and interprets the history of the Goleta Valley.

== History ==
The Stow House was once the headquarters of Rancho La Patera, on the original Rancho La Goleta. In 1871, William Whitney Stow, a legal counsel for Southern Pacific Railroad in San Francisco, purchased 1,043 acres (4.22 km^{2}) costing $28,677 for his son, Sherman P. Stow. Sherman Stow built a Carpenter Gothic Victorian home on the site and moved into the house with his bride, Ida G. Hollister, in 1873. The family expanded the house in two major renovations in the 1880s and 1910s. The house was occupied by three generations of Stow descendants.

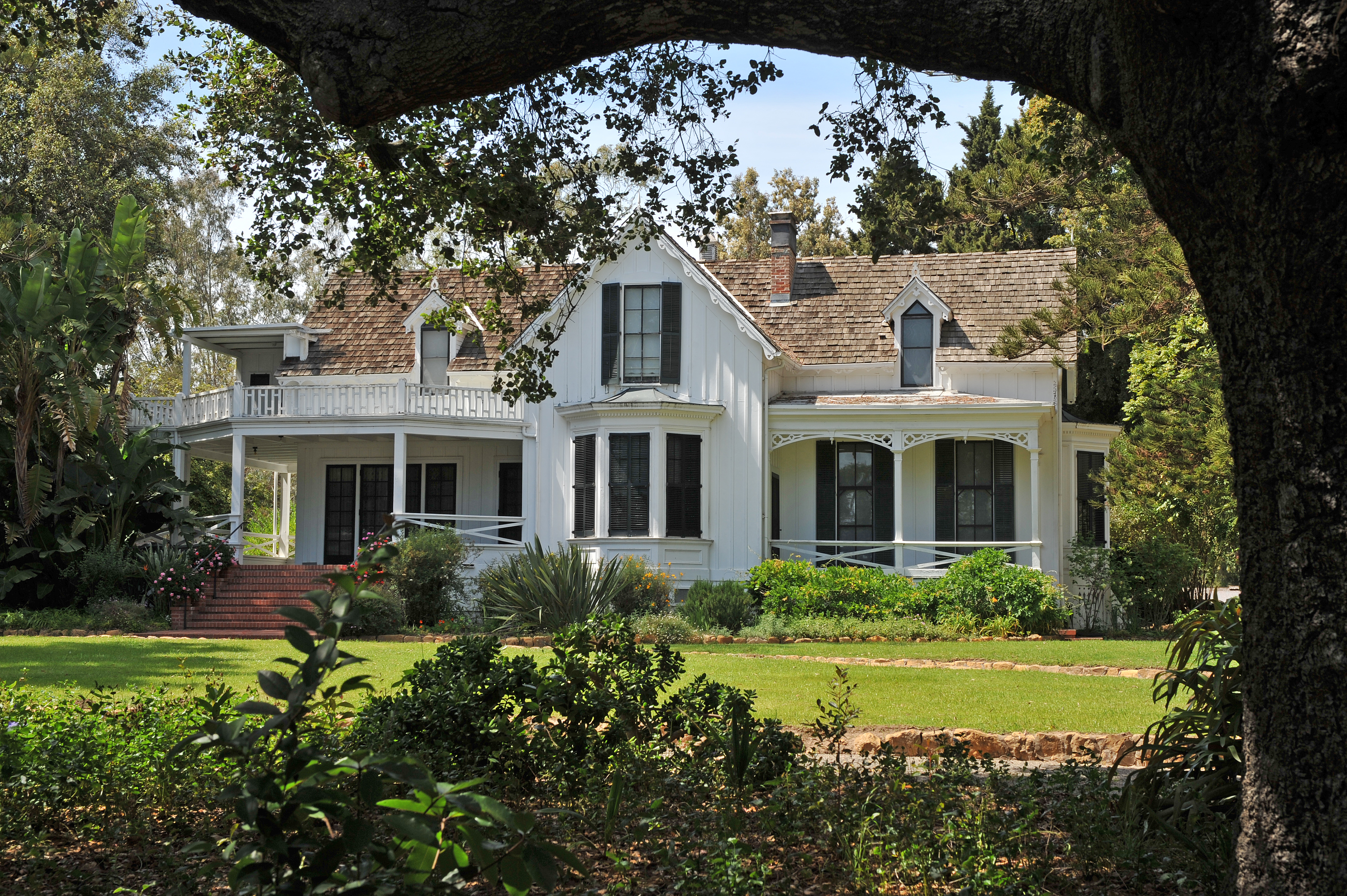
Stow House in Goleta Valley, California.

=== Lemon orchard ===
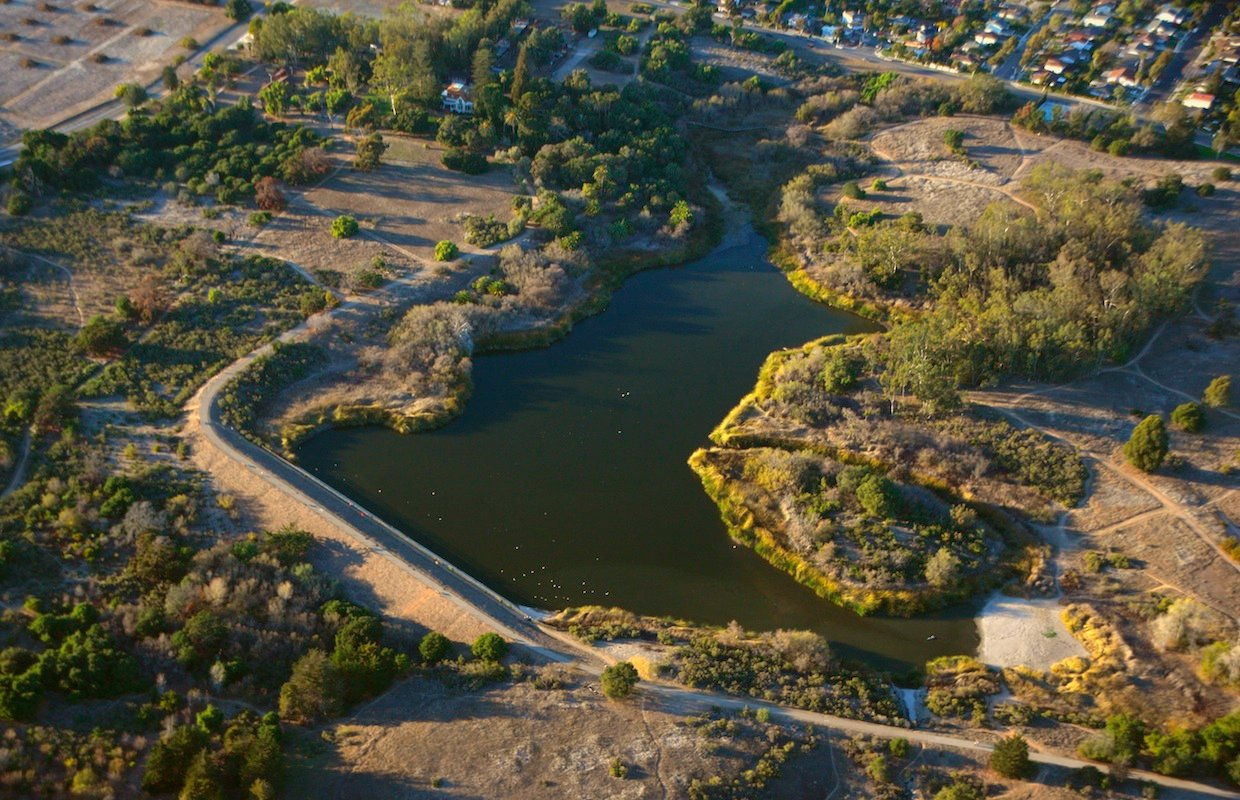
Stow House area, orchards, and Lake Los Carneros

In 1875, 3,000 lemon trees were planted in the first commercial lemon orchard planting in California. Sherman Stow's son, state senator Edgar Whitney Stow, set up a research laboratory at the ranch and developed disease resistant lemon rootstock of great value to local growers. The earliest commercial irrigation in the area took place on the ranch using the pond created by the Stows. The pond was expanded to create Lake Los Carneros which remains within the park.

== Museum ==
The house museum displays family photographs and furniture, with stories of Sherman and Ida Stow and their descendants.

== Nearby attractions ==
The Stow House is located next to Lake Los Carneros with walking trails and bird watching, Goleta Depot at the South Coast Railroad Museum, and other points of interest in Goleta. Wildlife including coyotes and bobcats have been observed from the trails.

== Hauntings ==
The Stow House was featured on episode 4, season 26 of Ghost Adventures which first aired on June 28, 2023. During the episode, the Ghost Adventures crew investigated the Stow House and interviewed people who claimed to have witnessed supernatural activity within the house.
