= Goleta Union School District =

School district in California, United States

Goleta Union School District (G.U.S.D. or GUSD) is a school district serving the Goleta Valley, a suburban community of 80,000 people which includes the newly formed City of Goleta and a large unincorporated area. The valley lies between the Santa Ynez Mountains and the Pacific Ocean, adjacent to Santa Barbara, California, in the United States. The area is known for its cultural, academic, and recreational opportunities, as well as its mild climate.

The District serves 3,700 elementary students in nine schools, all Kindergarten through Grade 6. Class size averages 20 in Grades K, 1, 2, and 3; and averages 24 in Grades 4, 5, and 6. The District has a diverse student population and professional staff. Approximately 28% of students are English language learners.

Programs in composition, computer literacy, and mathematics have been nationally recognized. All schools offer programs in technology, science, music, art, and physical education. All schools offer a Gifted and Talented Education (GATE) Program in grades 4, 5 and 6. All schools have a computer center, and all classrooms and offices are wired for high-speed communications.

The District’s financial condition is sound. The District has over 253 certificated employees and some 276 classified employees. GUSD maintains excellent special education and support services. Students in the Goleta Union Elementary School District become a part of the Santa Barbara Unified School District following graduation. They attend Goleta Valley or La Colina Junior High School, in Grades 7 through 8, and Dos Pueblos or San Marcos High School in Grades 9 through 12.

== Schools ==
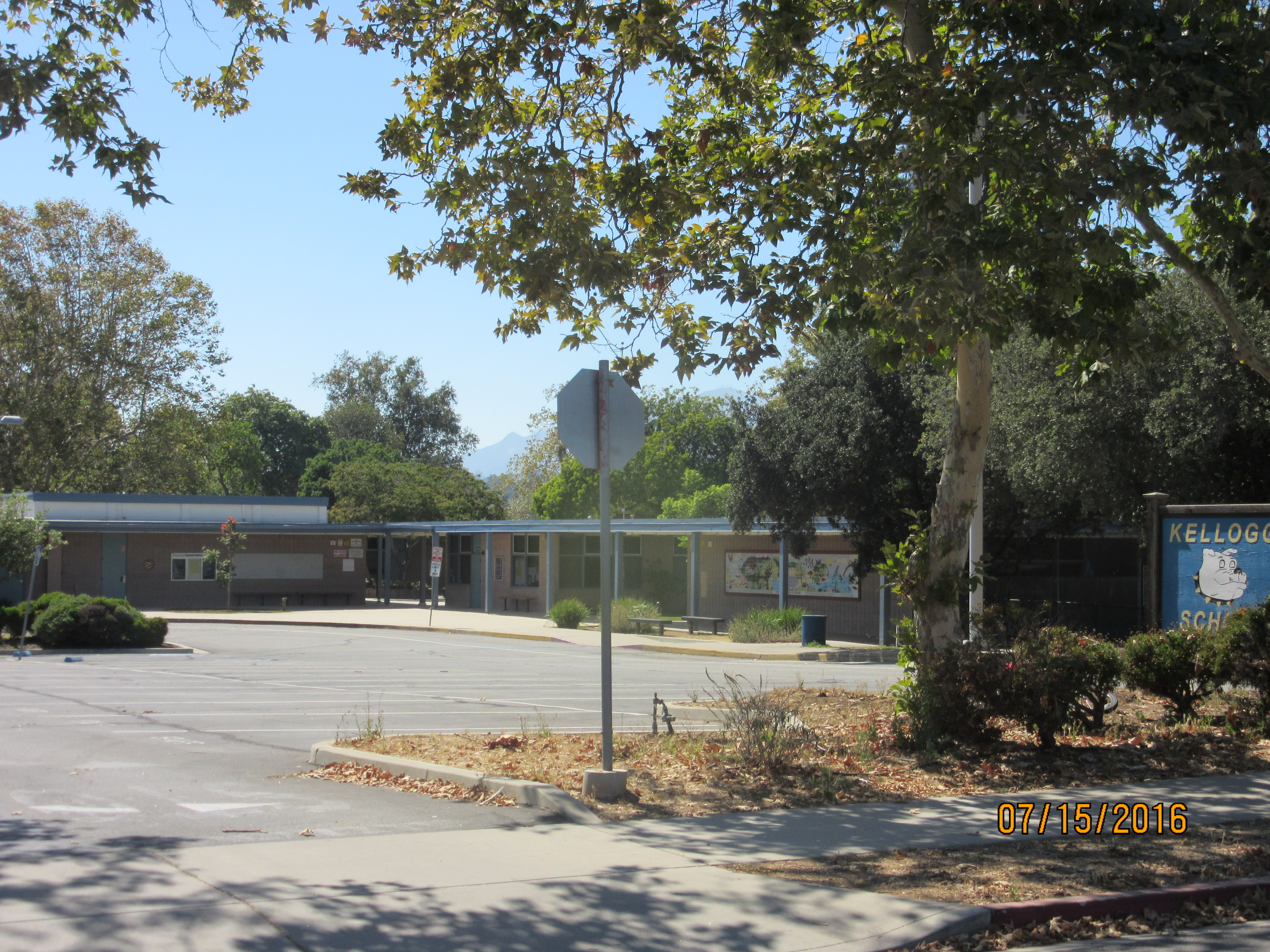
The front entrance to Kellogg Elementary school, a school in Goleta.

- Brandon Elementary School
  - Website
- El Camino Elementary School
  - Website
- Ellwood Elementary School
  - Website
- Foothill Elementary School
  - Website
- Goleta Family School
  - Website
- Hollister Elementary School
  - Website
- Isla Vista Elementary School
  - Website
- Kellogg Elementary School
  - Website
- La Patera Elementary School
  - Website
- Mountain View Elementary School
  - Website
