= Alexander Smith Taylor =

American historian

- Born: April 16, 1817; Charleston, South Carolina, United States
- Died: July 27, 1876 (aged 59); Rancho La Goleta, California, United States

Alexander Smith Taylor (1817–1876), best known for his Indianology of California written in a column for The California Farmer and Journal of Useful Arts (1860–1861).

== Life ==
His father, A. S. Taylor, was a naval officer of some distinction in the War of 1812. His mother, Mary Chapman, was a native of Wapping Parish, London.

He arrived in Monterey, California on September 8, 1848 on the brig Pacific. In 1849, he opened an apothecary shop and resided in Monterey until 1860 when he moved to Santa Barbara. It is unknown whether he visited the "gold diggings". While in Monterey he also worked as "clerk of the United States District Court". In 1860, he married Maria Josefa Ortega y Hill, a daughter of Daniel A. Hill and Rafaela Luisa Olivera y Ortega of Santa Barbara. Taylor was survived by his wife and three (3) children.

Noted as a collector, author and historian of California and other western topics. Historians are indebted to his rather large collection of documents. 6000 items related to California history from 1770–1846 include: 800 items dated before 1800, and 4500 items before 1840. The collection includes papers, letters, reports and proclamations from the government.

In addition to this he had other large collections. One collection includes 400 "specimens" from newspapers printed in California from 1846–1854, many short-lived and some unique. Much of his collection was lost in the San Francisco Earthquake and Fire of 1906. Even with this many items remain in major collections; this along with his writings.

== Works ==
Some prominent writings include:

- Discovery of California and the Northwest America. The first voyage to the coasts of California; made in the years 1542 and 1543, by Juan Rodriguez Cabrillo and his pilot Bartolome Ferrelo., San Francisco Herald 1853.
- The Great Condor of California, Hutchings' Illustrated California Magazine, June, July, and August 1859.
- The Grasshoppers and Locusts of California, published in both the Farmer June, July, and August 1859, and Smithsonian Report, 1859.
- Indianology of California 1860–1863, in about 140 issues in Farmer.
  - The original manuscript includes 1100 pages.
- Historical Summary of Lower California, 1532–1867, Resources of the Pacific States 1869
- Bibliography of Alaska, 1600-1867, Resources of the Pacific States 1869
- "His proudest work", Bibliografa California: or notes and materials to aid in forming a more perfect bibliography of those countries anciently called 'California', and lying within the limits of the Gulf of Cortez to the Arctic Seas, and west of the Rocky Mountains to the Pacific Ocean.[sic], Sacramento Daily Union June 25, 1863 (with supplement printed March 13, 1866)

Of his many unpublished works Robert Ernest Cowan writes:

Poor, unhappy and misguided bibliophile! Although for twenty-five years he had labored tirelessly and incessantly, but little of his work ever assumed permanent form. Some of it still-born, and more of it by his singular plans and methods suffered self-defeat. (...)

== Honors ==
Alexander Smith Taylor received several honors while alive. In recognition of his historical researches he was elected a member of American Antiquarian Society in April 1864. And for his interest in scientific discovery, he was made an honorary member of the California Academy of Sciences.

Hubert Howe Bancroft said about him:

It were well to judge a man not alone by what he has accomplished, but also by what he has conscientiously tried to perform.

== Taylor's unpublished map of 1864 ==
An obscure 1941 article by Robert Fleming Heizer entitled Alexander S. Taylor's Map of California Indian Tribes, 1864 describes the map.

Text from opening paragraph:

Most California historians and anthropologists are acquainted with Alexander Smith Taylor's work, "The Indianology of California,"^{1} which still remains hidden away in its recondite newspaper source. This early work has been widely used by later authors, notably Powers^{2}, Bancroft^{3}, and Kroeber^{4}. (It is of) value, regardless of numerous errors of various sorts, lies in the recording of a large body of source data concerning native groups now extinct, particularly many of the coastal tribes who came under Spanish mission influence.[sic]

The last sentence originally read "Its value". What Heizer meant to write becomes clear on the next page where he writes:

Second paragraph:

Taylor's source of information constitutes the greatest single problem to be solved in order to interpret fully his major work, the "Indianology." The excellent biographical account of Taylor^{10} helps somewhat, but only after long and careful checking through the printed sources shall we some day be able to reconstruct his bibliography.[sic] ...

== Spurious coinage devised ==
Taylor made up several words and phrases, giving historians cause for concern. Indianology, his most quoted work, was perhaps an invention for the popular audience of his time. The term Bibliografa, which caused him the most grief, not just from this fabricated word, but because the work has some "titles that never had any existence". However, Precis India California, considered a "reputable work", demonstrates well his knack for formulating his own rules with language.
