= Rancho Nojoqui =

Land grant in California

Coordinates: 34.580°N 120.130°W

Rancho Nojoqui was a 13,284-acre (53.76 km^{2}) Mexican land grant in present-day Santa Barbara County, California given in 1843 by Governor Manuel Micheltorena to Raimundo Carrillo. The grant was located in the Santa Ynez Valley and foothills of the Santa Ynez Mountains, just south of present-day Solvang.

== History ==
In 1843, the three square league Rancho Nojoqui was granted to Raimundo Carrillo, grandson of José Raimundo Carrillo. Raimundo was alcalde of Santa Barbara in 1849.

With the cession of California to the United States following the Mexican-American War, the 1848 Treaty of Guadalupe Hidalgo provided that the land grants would be honored. As required by the Land Act of 1851, a claim for Rancho Nojoqui was filed with the Public Land Commission in 1852, and the grant was patented to Raimundo Carrillo in 1869.

Ulpiano Yndart (1828–1902), a Basque immigrant, came to California in 1849, and bought Rancho Nojoqui in 1854. He was ruined by the drought of 1864, but went on to a successful political career, serving as Santa Barbara city treasurer and as a commissioner overseeing the creation of Ventura County in the early 1870s.

In 1868, H.W. Pierce bought Rancho Nojoqui from Yndart. William Pierce also owned Rancho Tequepis and Rancho San Marcos. Pierce called his property Alisal Ranch.

Charles H. Jackson Jr. acquired the Alisal Ranch in 1943 and opened it as a guest ranch in 1946.

== See also ==
- Nojoqui Falls
- Ranchos of California
- List of Ranchos of California
