= Lyric Shen =

American artist (born 1993)

Lyric Shen (born 1993) is an American visual artist. Her interdisciplinary practice is focused on sculpture and tattooing, and also includes working in ceramics, installation art, movement-based performance, works on paper, and metal fabrication. Shen’s work engages themes of memory, labor, sexuality, material culture, and collective production; and she is a sex workers' rights activist. Shen is based in Los Angeles, California.

== Early life and education ==
Lyric Shen was born in 1993 in Goleta, California, where she was also raised.

Shen studied at Cranbrook Academy of Art (class of 2022), where she focused on ceramics and material-based practices.

== Career ==
Shen works across multiple mediums including ceramic, paper, metal, movement, and tattoo-based imagery. Her ceramic works often incorporate soda-fired stoneware techniques and emphasize surface treatment and sculptural form. In addition to ceramics, Shen produces metal-based sculptural works that combine industrial materials with organic and synthetic elements. According to Cultured magazine, Shen’s work has been noted for its material experimentation and engagement with contemporary ceramic discourse.

Shen was featured in art exhibitions such as Jupiter Finger (2021), hosted by Real Pain Los Angeles, and Wall Sits (2019) by the art collective Kunstverein München. The artist uses the mediums of movement, ceramic, paper, metal, and tattoo art.

Shen produced a collage and painting series, a four-page spread in collaboration with volume two of the All Sex Workers Go to Heaven collective zine. Shen's ceramic piece, crafted using soda-fired stoneware, S. Flower Tray, was displayed at an art exhibition at Kunstverein München in 2019. The artist's metalwork, Jewel Stand, was exhibited at Jupiter Finger. The base of Jewel Stand is crafted from steel, and the central tabletop section is created from resin, clay, condoms, and plant matter.

== Exhibitions ==
=== Solo exhibitions ===
- Lyric Shen: Promise’s Room (2023), solo exhibition, Silke Lindner, New York City, New York
- There is an occlusion (2025) solo exhibition, Silke Lindner, New York City, New York

=== Group exhibitions ===
- Wall Sits (2019), group exhibition, Kunstverein München, Munich, Germany
- Jupiter Finger (2021), group exhibition, Real Pain Los Angeles, Los Angeles, California
- Human Marks: Tattooing in Contemporary Art (2025), group exhibition, University of Hartford, West Hartford, Connecticut
