= Goleta station =

Railway station in Goleta, California, US

Goleta, CA
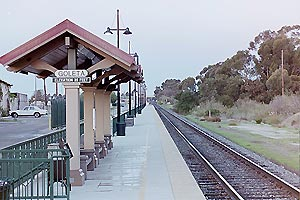
- Goleta station in January 2002

General information
- Location: 25 South La Patera Lane; Goleta, California; United States
- Coordinates: 34°26′16″N 119°50′35″W
- Owner: Amtrak
- Line: UP Santa Barbara Subdivision
- Platforms: 1 side platform
- Tracks: 1

Construction
- Parking: Yes
- Accessible: Yes

Other information
- Status: Unstaffed, platform with shelters
- Station code: Amtrak: GTA

History
- Opened: September 20, 1998; 27 years ago

Passengers
- FY 2025: 86,988 (Amtrak)

Services
Preceding station	Amtrak	Following station
Lompoc–Surf toward San Luis Obispo	Pacific Surfliner	Santa Barbara toward San Diego
Coast Starlight does not stop here
Former services
Preceding station	Southern Pacific Railroad	Following station
Jalama toward San Francisco	Coast Line	Samarkand toward Los Angeles
Location

Goleta station is a passenger rail station in the city of Goleta, California. It is served by the Amtrak Pacific Surfliner; it is the northern terminal for three of those round trips. Trains terminating in Goleta are stored on a storage track adjacent to the station.

Goleta station is served by 10 Amtrak Pacific Surfliner trains (5 in each direction) evenly spaced throughout the day. The station is convenient for the Santa Barbara Airport and the University of California, Santa Barbara.

In fiscal year 2025, 86,988 passengers boarded or detrained at Goleta station.

== History ==
The original Goleta Depot, built in 1901, was moved to Lake Los Carneros County Park, half a mile northwest of the current location, in 1981. It is part of the South Coast Railroad Museum.

Opened with a concrete platform and open-air shelter in 1998, the station gained a restroom facility in 2008 that was installed through the joint effort of the city, California Department of Transportation (Caltrans), Amtrak and the Santa Barbara Council of Governments. The station also received bike racks and a new bus turning circle.

In 2018, the station was awarded a $13 million TIRCP grant to upgrade the station. In 2024, the city of Goleta started construction on a new full-service multi-modal train station next to the existing station.

The Santa Barbara County Association of Governments (SBCAG) had announced plans for Metrolink service to/from Los Angeles Union Station to begin in Winter, 2026, starting with one daily trip in each direction, however the plans were scrapped in favor of an additional Pacific Surfliner train.
