= Rancho Tequepis =

Mexican land grant in California, United States

Coordinates: 34.590°N 119.930°W

Rancho Tequepis was a 8,919-acre (36.09 km^{2}) Mexican land grant in the upper Santa Ynez Valley of present-day Santa Barbara County, California. The grant extended along both sides of the Santa Ynez River at the mouth of Cachuma Creek east of present-day Santa Ynez and north/below San Marco Pass. Much of the grant is now under the waters of Lake Cachuma which was formed in 1953.

It was given in 1845 by Governor Pio Pico to Joaquin Villa.

== History ==
With the cession of California to the United States following the Mexican-American War, the 1848 Treaty of Guadalupe Hidalgo provided that the land grants would be honored. As required by the Land Act of 1851, a claim for Rancho Tequepis was filed with the Public Land Commission in 1852, and the grant was patented to Joaquin Villa's son, Antonio Maria Villa (1829–1899) in 1869.

William Pierce acquired Rancho Tequepis from Villa's heirs in 1868. Pierce also owned the adjoining Rancho San Marcos and Rancho Nojoqui.

== See also ==
- Ranchos of Santa Barbara County, California
- Ranchos of California
- List of Ranchos of California
