= Bacara Resort =

Luxury resort near Santa Barbara, California, United States

Coordinates: 34.4333°N 119.9164°W

Bacara Resort and Spa
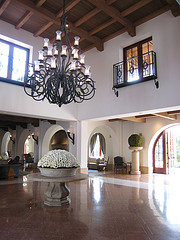
- Type: Hotel
- Industry: Luxury
- Founded: 2000
- Headquarters: Santa Barbara, California, USA
- Website: Official website

The Ritz-Carlton Bacara Resort and Spa is a Spanish-style luxury resort located in Goleta, California, west of Santa Barbara, California. Built in 2000, the Bacara Resort & Spa cost $222 million to develop, and offers 311 guest rooms and 49 premium suites.

The hotel includes three restaurants, four bars and a 42,000-square-foot (3,900 m^{2}) spa on the resort's 78 acres (32 ha) beachfront. Additional resort features include a tennis center with four clay tennis courts, proximity to two 18-hole golf courses, three pools, a screening room, meeting space and access to a two-mile (3 km) stretch of sandy beach.

In July 2005, the Bacara Resort was sold to P3 Development, NA Inc. for an undisclosed amount.

== Restaurants and dining ==
Rated the top restaurant in the Santa Barbara area in 2011, Angel Oak's restaurant at Bacara initially featured Basque-Catalan cuisine made with vegetables grown on the resort's 1,000-acre (400 ha) ranch.

More recently, Angel Oak has shifted to being a high-end steakhouse.

== Celebrity weddings ==
Hollywood couples including Nick Carter and Lauren Kitt, Fergie and Josh Duhamel, Travis Barker and Shanna Moakler, Jennie Garth and Peter Facinelli and Charlie Sheen’s daughter, Casandra Estevez, all celebrated their weddings at the Bacara. Travis Barker and Shanna Moakler’s 2004 wedding had a red and black "Nightmare Before Christmas" theme. Sarah Michelle Gellar, best known for her role as Buffy the Vampire Slayer, was a bridesmaid in her manager's wedding, which was held at Bacara.

== 2026 FIFA World Cup ==
During the 2026 FIFA World Cup, the Bacara Resort served as the training camp and team hotel of the Austria national football team. Their training facility was Harder Stadium at the University of California, Santa Barbara.

== Awards ==
In 2011, the resort received the Wine Spectator Best of Award of Excellence for the wine cellar at Miro restaurant:
