= South Coast Railroad Museum =

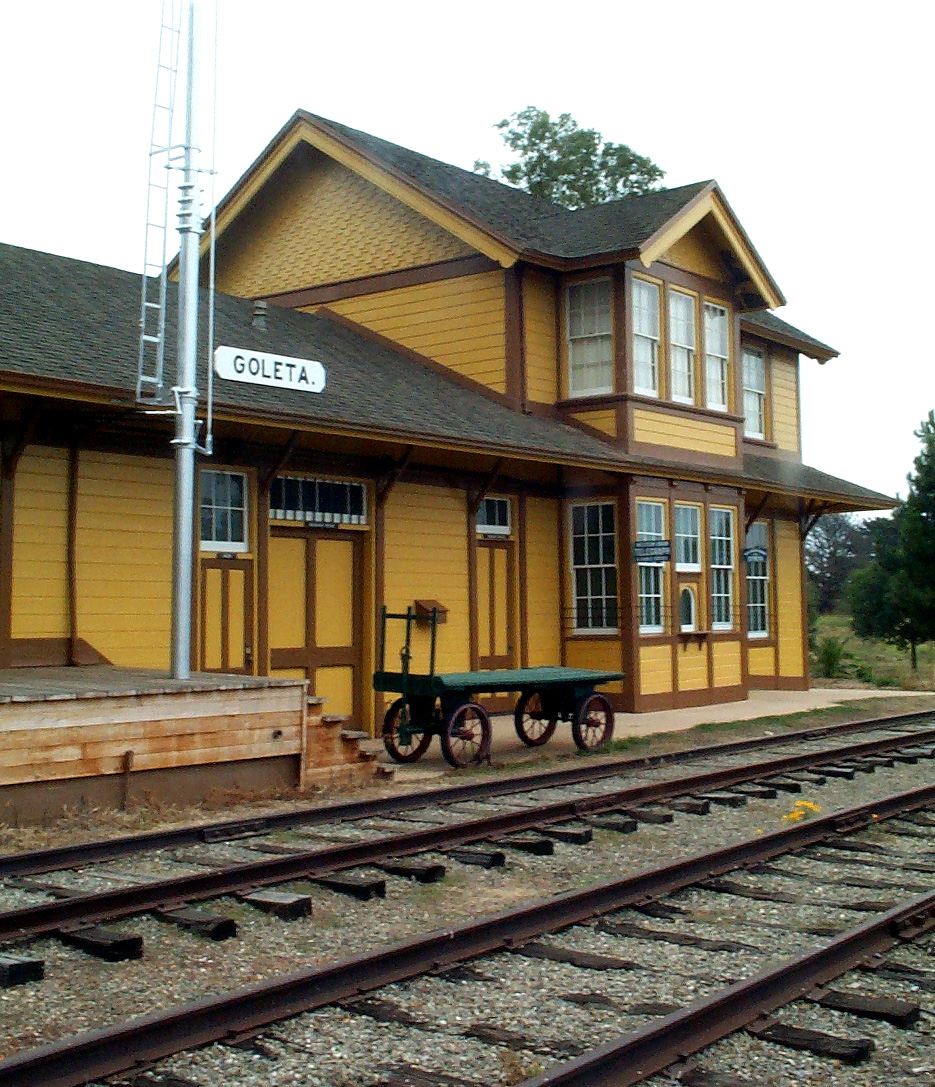
- Goleta Depot, part of the museum
- Location: 300 North Los Carneros Road; Goleta, California
- Coordinates: 34°26′32″N 119°51′10″W
- Type: Railroad museum
- Website: Official website

The South Coast Railroad Museum in Goleta, California is a showplace for the Goleta Depot, a preserved 1901 Southern Pacific Railroad train station. The museum also features the Goleta Short Line, a 7 1/2 in (190.5 mm) gauge miniature railroad, a Southern Pacific bay-window caboose, and a model train layout room, set in a panorama of the cities of Goleta and Santa Barbara, California, in the early 1940’s.

The depot is listed on the National Register of Historic Places and on the California Register of Historical Resources.

== History ==
The Southern Pacific closed the Goleta passenger train depot in October 1973. Various preservation efforts led to the depot being physically moved to its current location at Lake Los Carneros County Park in November 1981. After 11 months of restoration, a dedication ceremony of the Goleta Depot as a Santa Barbara county landmark took place on October 10, 1982.

Ownership of the Goleta Depot was subsequently transferred from the preservation society that had had the depot moved, to the Institute for American Research, to develop the site as a living museum in 1983.

== Nearby attractions ==
A new train station with a concrete platform and open-air shelter opened nearby in 1998 for Amtrak trains. The city is currently building a new station resembling the original one. The design and paint scheme pays homage to the original station.

The South Coast Railroad Museum is located next to Lake Los Carneros with walking trails and bird watching, the historic Stow House at Rancho La Patera, and other points of interest.

== See also ==
- History of Santa Barbara, California
- List of museums in the California Central Coast
- National Register of Historic Places, List of Properties in Santa Barbara County, California
