= Goleta Depot =

Goleta
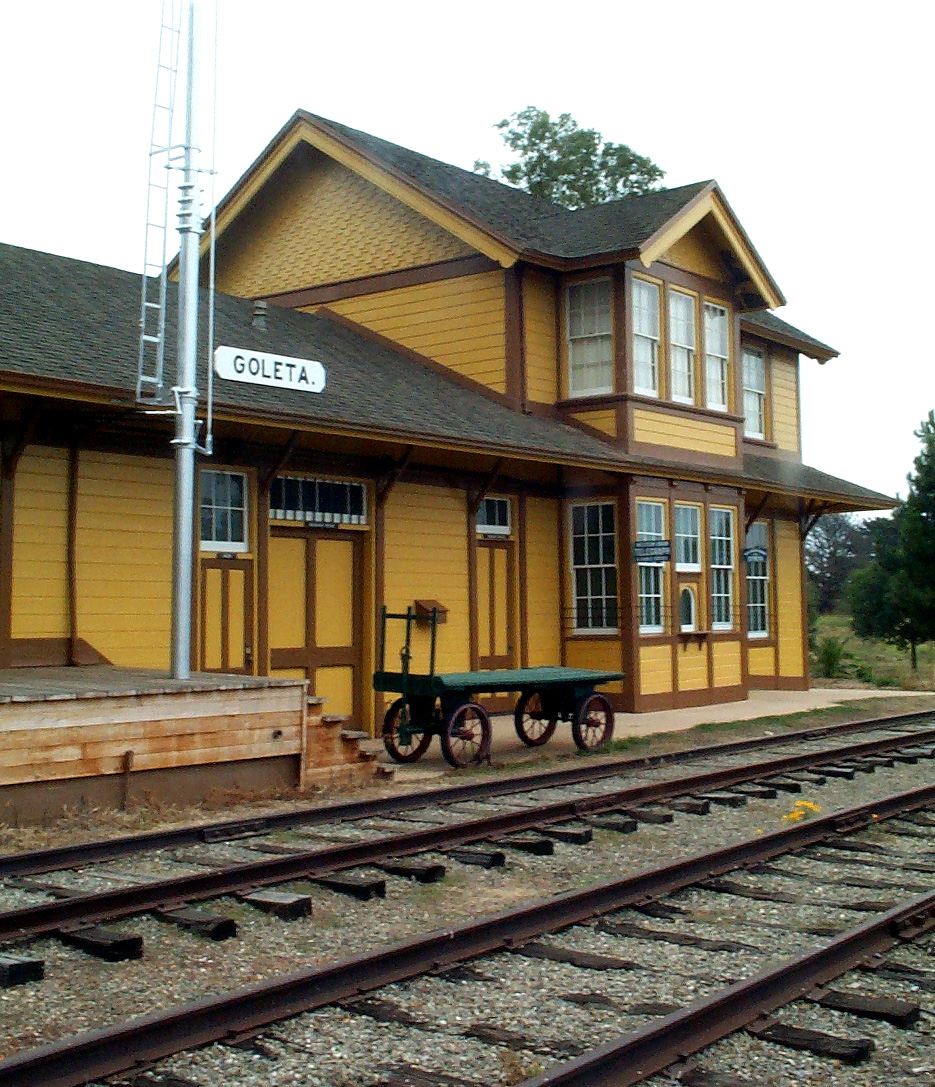
- Goleta Depot, 2006.

General information
- Location: 300 North Los Carneros Road, Goleta, California
- Coordinates: 34°26′32″N 119°51′10″W

Services
Preceding station	Southern Pacific Railroad	Following station
Gaviota toward San Francisco	Coast Line	Santa Barbara toward Los Angeles
- Goleta Depot
- U.S. National Register of Historic Places
- Built: 1901
- Architect: Southern Pacific Railroad
- Architectural style: Stick/eastlake
- NRHP reference No.: 01001457
- Added to NRHP: January 18, 2002
Location

Goleta Depot is a train station building in Goleta, California constructed by the Southern Pacific Railroad in 1901, as part of the completion of the Coast Route linking Los Angeles and San Francisco. It is a Southern Pacific standard design Two Story Combination Depot No. 22. The building is listed on the National Register of Historic Places and the California Register of Historical Resources and is the centerpiece of the South Coast Railroad Museum.

Southern Pacific closed its Goleta station in the 1970s. Eventually, Goleta Beautiful, a civic organization, obtained rights to the abandoned building which was moved on November 18–19, 1981 to nearby Lake Los Carneros County Park. The park is the site of historic Stow House and Lake Los Carneros with walking trails and bird watching. The station was rehabilitated and restored, reopening in October 1982. At first, the station also housed three local nonprofit organizations, the Goleta Valley Chamber of Commerce, Institute for American Research and Santa Barbara Audubon Society in addition to the museum, in a form of adaptive reuse. Later, the entire building became the home of the South Coast Railroad Museum.

A new train station with a concrete platform and open-air shelter opened nearby in 1998 for Amtrak trains.

== See also ==
- Registered Historic Places in Santa Barbara County
- Southern Pacific Railroad Passenger Station and Freight House in Springfield, Oregon, a similar two-story depot design
