= Goleta, California =

City in California, United States

- City
- City of Goleta
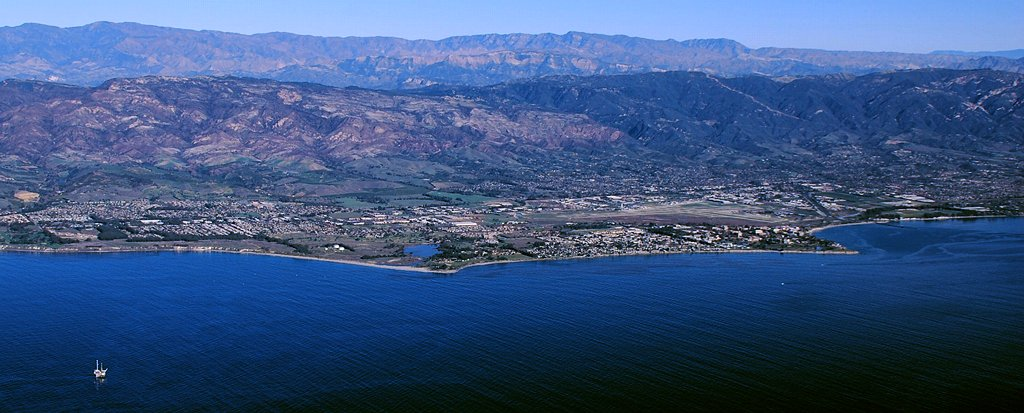
- Aerial photo of the Goleta area from offshore

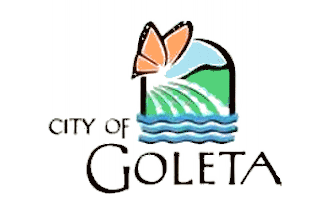
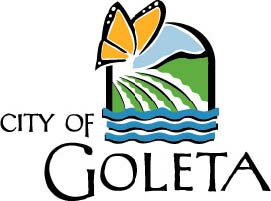
- Flag Seal
- Nickname: The Good Land
- Interactive map of Goleta, California
- Location in the United States Goleta (the United States)
- Coordinates: 34°26′26″N 119°48′49″W
- Country: United States
- State: California
- County: Santa Barbara
- Incorporated: February 1, 2002

Government
  - Type: Council–Manager
  - Mayor: Paula Perotte
  - Mayor Pro Tem: Stuart Kasdin
  - City council: James Kyriaco; Luz Reyes-Martín; Jennifer Smith
  - State legislators: Sen. Monique Limón (D); Asm. Gregg Hart (D)
  - U.S. Rep.: Salud Carbajal (D)

Area
  - Total: 7.93 sq mi (20.53 km^{2})
  - Land: 7.85 sq mi (20.34 km^{2})
  - Water: 0.073 sq mi (0.19 km^{2}) 0.91%
- Elevation: 20 ft (6 m)

Population (2020)
  - Total: 32,690
  - Density: 4,163/sq mi (1,607/km^{2})
- Time zone: UTC−8 (Pacific Time Zone)
  - Summer (DST): UTC−7 (PDT)
- ZIP Codes: 93111, 93116–93118, 93160, 93199
- Area code: 805
- FIPS code: 06-30378
- GNIS feature ID: 1660687, 2015546
- Website: cityofgoleta.org

Goleta (/ɡəˈliːtə/ gə-LEE-tə; Spanish: [ɡoˈleta]; Spanish for "schooner") is a city in southern Santa Barbara County, California, United States. It was incorporated as a city in 2002, after a long period as the largest unincorporated populated area in the county. As of the 2000 census, the census-designated place (CDP) had a total population of 55,204. A significant portion of the census territory of 2000 was not included in the city. The population of Goleta was 32,690 at the 2020 census. It is known for being close to the campus of the University of California, Santa Barbara.

== History ==
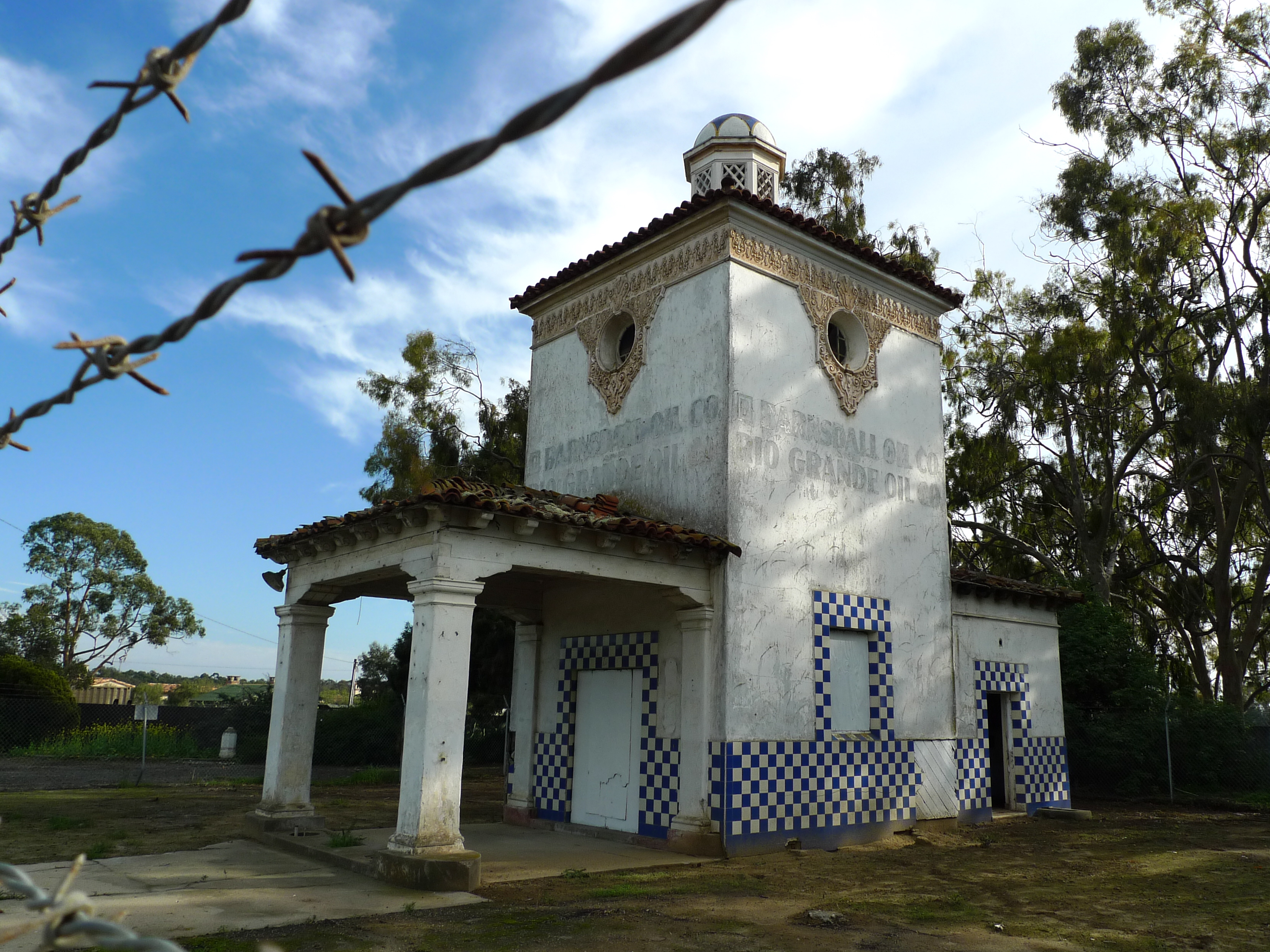
Historic Spanish Colonial Revival style Barnsdall-Rio Grande station outside the former Ellwood Oil Field

=== Early history ===
The area of present-day Goleta was populated for thousands of years by the Chumash people. Locally, they became known, by the Spanish, as Canaliños as they lived along the coast, adjacent to the Channel Islands. One of the largest villages, S'axpilil, was north of the Goleta Slough, not far from the present-day Santa Barbara Airport.While one source cites the Spanish for the ship type 'schooner' as the source of the place name but rather from the Spanish Goleta referring to a river mouth represented by Goleta Slough.

The first known European visitor to the Goleta area was Portuguese mariner Juan Rodríguez Cabrillo, who in the employ of the Spanish Crown spent time around the Channel Islands in 1542, and died there the following year. During the 1980s, the discovery of a 16th-century] cannon on the beach led to the advancement of a theory that Sir Francis Drake sailed into the Goleta Slough in 1579. Goleta is one of many alternative locations (and the one farthest south) proposed for Drake's "New Albion", generally believed to be today's Drake's Bay, north of San Francisco.

In 1602, another sailing expedition, led by Sebastian Vizcaino, visited the California Coast. Vizcaino named the channel Santa Barbara. Spanish ships, associated with the Manila galleon trade, probably stopped in the area, intermittently, over the following 167 years; no permanent settlements were established.

The first land expedition to California, led by Gaspar de Portolà, spent several days in the area in 1769, on its way to Monterey Bay, and also spent the night of August 20 near a creek (possibly San Pedro Creek) to the north of the Goleta estuary. At that time, the estuary was a very large, open-water lagoon that covered most of (what is now) the city of Goleta, stretching as far north as Lake Los Carneros (adjacent to Stow House). There were at least five native towns in the area, the largest being on an island in the middle of the lagoon. For that reason, expedition engineer Miguel Costanso called the group of towns Pueblos de la Isla, or "towns of the island". Some of the soldiers called the island town Mescaltitlan, after a similarly insular Aztec settlement in Nayarit, Mexico. Franciscan missionary Juan Crespi, who accompanied the expedition, gave the towns the name Santa Margarita de Cortona.

The island retained the name Mescalitan Island (dropping the extra 'T' of the Aztec spelling), until it was bulldozed and flattened in 1941 to provide fill for the military airfield that is now Santa Barbara Airport (SBA). The wastewater treatment plant of the Goleta Sanitary District is located on what used to be the island.

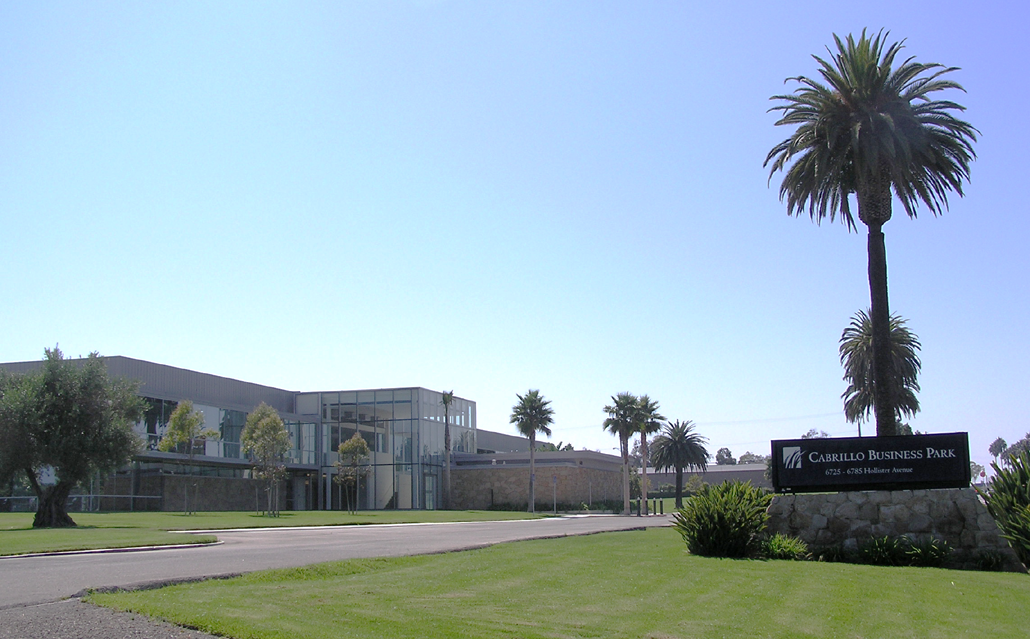
Cabrillo Business Park in Goleta

Portola returned to San Diego via the same route in January 1770, where he mounted a second expedition to Monterey that year. A second Spanish expedition came to the Santa Barbara area of Alta California in 1774, led by Juan Bautista de Anza. De Anza returned the following year, and the road along the coast of Santa Barbara County (today's Highway 1) soon became El Camino Real, connecting the string of Spanish missions.

An expedition in 1782, led by military governor Felipe de Neve, founded the Presidio of Santa Barbara, and soon thereafter, the Santa Barbara Mission. The Goleta area, along with most of the coastal areas of today's Santa Barbara County, was placed in the jurisdiction of the presidio and mission.

Sometime after the De Anza expeditions, a sailing ship (goleta) was wrecked at the mouth of the lagoon, and remained visible for many years, giving the area its current name. After Mexico became independent of Spain in 1821, most of the former mission ranch lands were divided up into large grants. The Goleta area became part of two adjacent ranchos. To the east of today's Fairview Avenue was Rancho La Goleta, named for the shipwreck and granted to Daniel A. Hill, the first American resident of Santa Barbara. An 1840s diseño (claim map) of the rancho shows the wrecked ship.

The parts of Goleta to the west of Fairview Avenue were in Rancho Dos Pueblos, granted in 1842 to Irish immigrant Nicholas Den, son-in-law of Daniel Hill. Rancho Dos Pueblos included the lagoon, airport, UCSB, and Isla Vista, extending to the west as far as the eastern boundary of today's El Capitan State Beach.

=== 19th and 20th centuries ===
The Goleta Valley was a prominent lemon-growing region during the late 19th and early 20th centuries, and was largely agricultural. Several areas, especially the Ellwood Mesa, were developed for oil and natural gas extraction. In the 1920s, aviation pioneers started using portions of the Goleta Slough that had silted in due to agriculture to land and takeoff. As former tidelands, the title to these lands was unclear. Starting in 1940, boosters from the city of Santa Barbara lobbied and obtained federal funding and passed a bond measure to formally develop an airport on the Goleta Slough. The necessity for an airport, or at least a military airfield, became more apparent after a Japanese submarine shelled the Ellwood Oil Field in 1942. This was one of the few direct-fire attacks on the U.S. continent during WWII. The Marine Corps undertook completion of the airport and established Marine Corps Air Station Santa Barbara on the site of the current airport and University of California, Santa Barbara, campus.

After the war, Goleta Valley residents supported the construction of Lake Cachuma, which provided water, enabling a housing boom and the establishment of research and aerospace firms in the area. In 1954, the University of California, Santa Barbara, moved to part of the former Marine base. Along with the boom in aerospace, the character changed from rural-agricultural to high tech. Goleta remains a center for high-tech firms, and a bedroom community for neighboring Santa Barbara.

=== Incorporation ===
Goleta was incorporated as a city in 2002 after several unsuccessful attempts. A significant urbanized area remains unincorporated between the cities of Goleta and Santa Barbara, largely consisting of the area that polled against incorporation prior to the 2002 election (this area was excluded from the city boundaries to facilitate approval of incorporation). Some discussion of annexation of this area (sometimes dubbed "Noleta") by the city of Santa Barbara had arisen.

In addition, the student community of Isla Vista directly to the south was excluded from the new city of Goleta. Whether or not to include Isla Vista was a subject of debate during incorporation planning, including Goleta residents concerned about impacts on tax revenue and the voting patterns of students. A Local Agency Formation Commission report supported excluding Isla Vista because of differences in "community identity", but considered both including and excluding Isla Vista to be viable choices.

=== Postal shooting ===
On January 30, 2006, Jennifer San Marco shot and killed six postal workers, before fatally shooting herself at the postal processing facility where she had previously been employed. This incident is believed to be the deadliest workplace shooting ever carried out in the United States by a woman.

== Geography ==
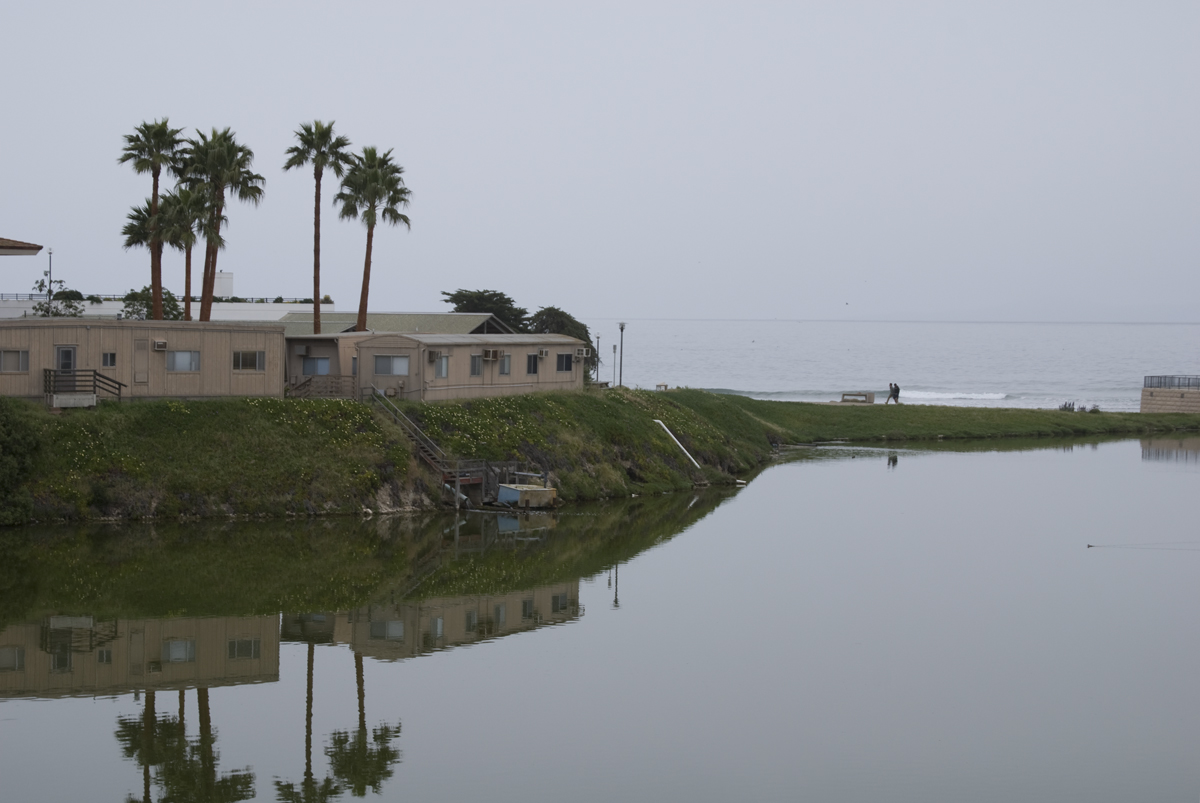
UCSB Lagoon

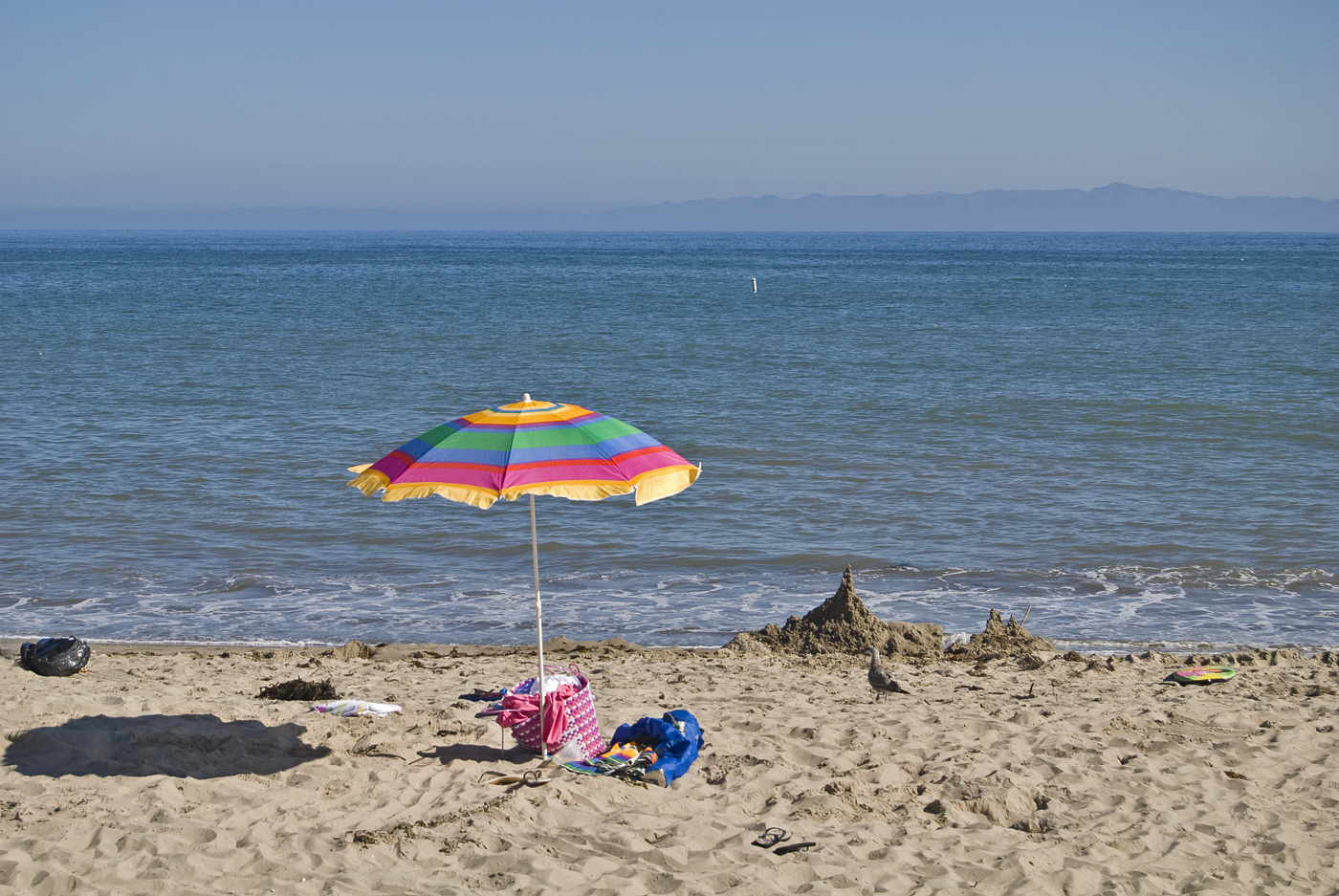
Goleta Beach

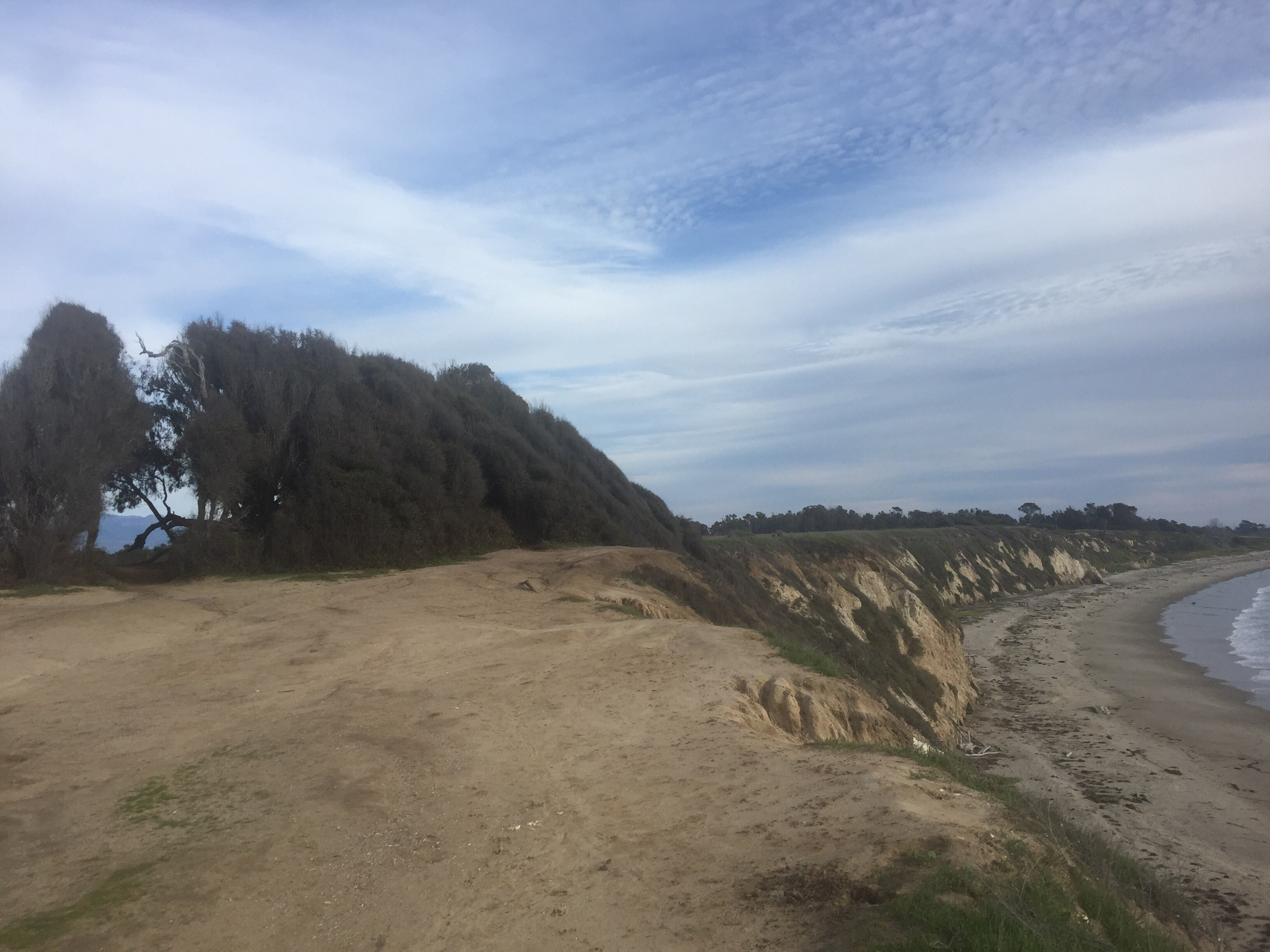
A shoreline near Goleta

Goleta is about 8 miles (13 km) west of the city of Santa Barbara, along the coast (the coast runs east to west in this portion of Southern California). Nearby is the Santa Barbara campus of the University of California and the student community of Isla Vista.

According to the United States Census Bureau, the city has a total area of 7.9 square miles (20 km^{2}), of which 0.07 sq mi (0.18 km^{2}) (0.91%) is covered by water.

=== Geology ===
The Goleta Valley is a coastal plain, about 3 mi (4.8 km) across, between the Santa Ynez Mountains, the principal mountain range of southern Santa Barbara County, and the Pacific Ocean. It consists of Holocene and Pleistocene alluvium, colluvium, and estuarine deposits, as well as marine terraces created during interglacial high-sea-level episodes. The area has been subject to rapid geologic uplift, as evidenced by its coastal bluffs and narrow beaches. Between the flattest part of the Goleta Valley and the ocean, an area of uplift parallels the shore, which includes, from west to east, Isla Vista, Mescalitan Island, More Mesa, and the Hope Ranch Hills. The elevation of this block of land relative to Goleta Valley increases from 40 to 300 ft along this length. The uplift was caused by motion along the More Ranch Fault, one of the most geologically active faults in the area. The More Ranch Fault roughly follows a line along El Colegio Road, through the southern part of the airport, along Atascadero Creek, and then continues east into Santa Barbara as the Mission Ridge Fault Zone. Soils in Goleta are mostly well-drained, brown, fine, sandy loam of the Milpitas series.

Underneath the alluvial units of the coastal plain are three prominent bedrock units: Monterey Formation, Sisquoc Formation, and Santa Barbara Formation. This last unit is the principal groundwater aquifer for the region, and its freshwater wells are protected from seawater intrusion by the uplift along the More Ranch Fault, which has placed relatively impermeable rock units between the ocean and it.

Some of the underlying sedimentary units contain economically recoverable quantities of oil and gas. The Ellwood Oil Field was worked beginning in the 1920s, with its onshore portions only being dismantled in the 1970s. The La Goleta Gas Field was formerly productive on the bluffs west of More Mesa, and is now used for gas storage by the Southern California Gas Company.

The Santa Ynez Mountains form a scenic backdrop to Goleta. They consist of multiple layers of sandstone and conglomerate units dating from the Jurassic age to the present, uplifted rapidly since the Pliocene. Rapid uplift has given them their craggy, scenic character, and numerous landslides and debris flows, which form some of the urban and suburban lowland area, are testament to their geologically active nature. Covered by chaparral, the range exceeds 4,000 feet (1,200 m) in height to the northwest of Goleta, at Broadcast and Santa Ynez Peaks. Sundowner winds occur in both Goleta and Santa Barbara.

=== Wildlife ===
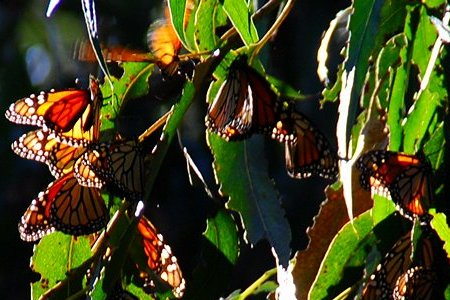
Monarch butterflies on the Ellwood Mesa

Bobcats can also be seen in the area. Coyotes sometimes prey on small domestic pets. Skunks sometimes spray, and often fall prey to cars, owls, dogs, and coyotes. Raccoons can become neighborhood pests. Opossums commonly inhabit neighborhoods. Dogs and cats sometimes kill small animals. Monarch butterflies spend the winter in several eucalyptus groves on the Ellwood Mesa. Bears and mountain lions live in the foothills and mountains around the town, but are rarely seen by residents.

=== Climate ===
Goleta has a mediterranean climate influenced by maritime winds from the Pacific Ocean with moderate average temperatures. Due to brief spells of winds from the interior, the warmest temperature on record is 109 °F (43 °C) and the coldest is 20 °F (−7 °C), a relatively large thermal range for a shoreline town.

Chilly days and warm nights are rare. The coldest maximum temperature on record is 45 °F (7 °C) in 1949 with the annual average between 1991 and 2020 being 54 °F (12 °C). The warmest night measured is a freak event of 81 °F (27 °C) during a heat snap in 1979, a full 10 °F (5.6 °C) warmer than the second-warmest night on record. During a regular year, the warmest night is at a mild 65 °F (18 °C).

Climate data for Santa Barbara Municipal Airport (1991–2020 normals, extremes since 1941)
Month	Jan	Feb	Mar	Apr	May	Jun	Jul	Aug	Sep	Oct	Nov	Dec	Year
Record high °F (°C)	87 (31)	87 (31)	94 (34)	96 (36)	101 (38)	109 (43)	109 (43)	105 (41)	104 (40)	103 (39)	97 (36)	89 (32)	109 (43)
Mean maximum °F (°C)	78 (26)	77 (25)	80 (27)	83 (28)	83 (28)	83 (28)	86 (30)	83 (28)	90 (32)	89 (32)	84 (29)	76 (24)	95 (35)
Mean daily maximum °F (°C)	64.2 (17.9)	63.8 (17.7)	65.9 (18.8)	67.8 (19.9)	69.2 (20.7)	70.3 (21.3)	73.3 (22.9)	74.5 (23.6)	74.3 (23.5)	73.4 (23.0)	69.2 (20.7)	64.3 (17.9)	69.2 (20.7)
Daily mean °F (°C)	52.8 (11.6)	53.7 (12.1)	56.1 (13.4)	58.0 (14.4)	60.3 (15.7)	62.4 (16.9)	65.7 (18.7)	66.2 (19.0)	65.0 (18.3)	62.1 (16.7)	56.7 (13.7)	52.3 (11.3)	59.3 (15.2)
Mean daily minimum °F (°C)	41.3 (5.2)	43.6 (6.4)	46.2 (7.9)	48.1 (8.9)	51.3 (10.7)	54.5 (12.5)	58.1 (14.5)	58.0 (14.4)	55.7 (13.2)	50.9 (10.5)	44.3 (6.8)	40.4 (4.7)	49.4 (9.7)
Mean minimum °F (°C)	32 (0)	35 (2)	38 (3)	41 (5)	45 (7)	49 (9)	52 (11)	52 (11)	48 (9)	43 (6)	35 (2)	31 (−1)	30 (−1)
Record low °F (°C)	24 (−4)	25 (−4)	30 (−1)	33 (1)	38 (3)	41 (5)	45 (7)	43 (6)	42 (6)	31 (−1)	30 (−1)	20 (−7)	20 (−7)
Average precipitation inches (mm)	3.84 (98)	3.86 (98)	3.10 (79)	0.91 (23)	0.42 (11)	0.11 (2.8)	0.02 (0.51)	0.01 (0.25)	0.07 (1.8)	0.73 (19)	1.27 (32)	2.91 (74)	17.25 (438)
Source: NOAA

== Demographics ==
Historical population
Census	Pop.	Note	%±
2000	55,204		—
2010	29,888		−45.9%
2020	32,690		9.4%
U.S. Decennial Census; 1860–1870 1880-1890; 1900 1910 1920; 1930 1940 1950; 1960 1970 1980; 1990 2000 2010; 2020

Goleta first appeared as a census designated place in the 2000 U.S. census and then as a city in 2001 after incorporation formed from part of deleted Goleta CDP, part of Isla Vista CDP, and additional area.

=== 2020 census ===
As of the 2020 census, Goleta had a population of 32,690 and a population density of 4,162.7 inhabitants per square mile (1,607.2/km^{2}). 100.0% of residents lived in urban areas, while 0.0% lived in rural areas.

The median age was 38.2 years. 19.1% of residents were under the age of 18 and 16.6% were 65 years of age or older. For every 100 females there were 102.2 males, and for every 100 females age 18 and over there were 100.6 males.

The census reported that 99.3% of the population lived in households, 0.2% lived in noninstitutionalized group quarters, and 0.5% were institutionalized.

There were 12,029 households, of which 30.7% had children under the age of 18 living in them. Of all households, 47.5% were married-couple households, 7.2% were cohabiting-couple households, 20.2% were households with a male householder and no spouse or partner present, and 25.1% were households with a female householder and no spouse or partner present. About 24.0% of all households were made up of individuals and 10.1% had someone living alone who was 65 years of age or older. The average household size was 2.7, and there were 7,789 families (64.8% of all households).

There were 12,643 housing units at an average density of 1,610.0 units per square mile (621.6 units/km^{2}). Of all housing units, 95.1% were occupied and 4.9% were vacant. Of occupied units, 51.4% were owner-occupied and 48.6% were renter-occupied. The homeowner vacancy rate was 0.8% and the rental vacancy rate was 2.8%.

Racial composition as of the 2020 census
Race	Number	Percent
White	16,987	52.0%
Black or African American	512	1.6%
American Indian and Alaska Native	489	1.5%
Asian	3,958	12.1%
Native Hawaiian and Other Pacific Islander	25	0.1%
Some other race	5,151	15.8%
Two or more races	5,568	17.0%
Hispanic or Latino (of any race)	11,552	35.3%

=== 2023 ACS 5-year estimates ===
In 2023, the US Census Bureau estimated that 22.5% of the population were foreign-born. Of all people 5 or older, 65.1% spoke only English at home, 22.3% spoke Spanish, 4.4% spoke other Indo-European languages, 7.7% spoke Asian or Pacific Islander languages, and 0.4% spoke other languages. Of those 25 or older, 89.7% were high-school graduates and 48.3% had a bachelor's degree.

The median household income was $118,039, and the per capita income was $52,610. About 5.4% of families and 10.6% of the population were below the poverty line.

=== 2010 census ===
At the 2010 census Goleta had a population of 29,888. The population density was 3,747.9 inhabitants per square mile (1,447.1/km^{2}). The racial makeup of Goleta was 69.7% White, 1.6% African American, 0.9% Native American, 9.1% Asian, 0.1% Pacific Islander,14.0% from other races, and 4.6% from two or more races. Hispanic or Latino people of any race were 32.9%.

The census reported that 29,687 people (99.3% of the population) lived in households, 23 (0.1%) lived in noninstitutionalized group quarters, and 178 (0.6%) were institutionalized.

Of the 10,903 households, 31.3% had children under 18 living in them, 48.3% were opposite-sex married couples living together, 9.8% had a female householder with no husband present, 4.3% had a male householder with no wife present, 6.0% were unmarried opposite-sex partnerships, and 0.8% were same-sex married couples or partnerships. About 25.1% of the households were one person and 10.0% had someone living alone who was 65 or older. The average household size was 2.72. With 6,806 families (62.4%), the average family size was 3.23.

The age distribution was 21.2% under 18, 12.7% from 18 to 24, 26.7% from 25 to 44, 25.9% from 45 to 64, and 13.5% who were 65 or older. The median age was 36.5 years. For every 100 females, there were 101.3 males. For every 100 females 18 and over, there were 100.2 males.

The 11,473 housing units had an average density of 1,438.7 per square mile; of the occupied units, 53.6% were owner-occupied and 46.4% were rented. The homeowner vacancy rate was 1.2%; the rental vacancy rate was 4.5%. About 54.3% of the population lived in owner-occupied housing units and 45.1% lived in rental units.

== Economy ==
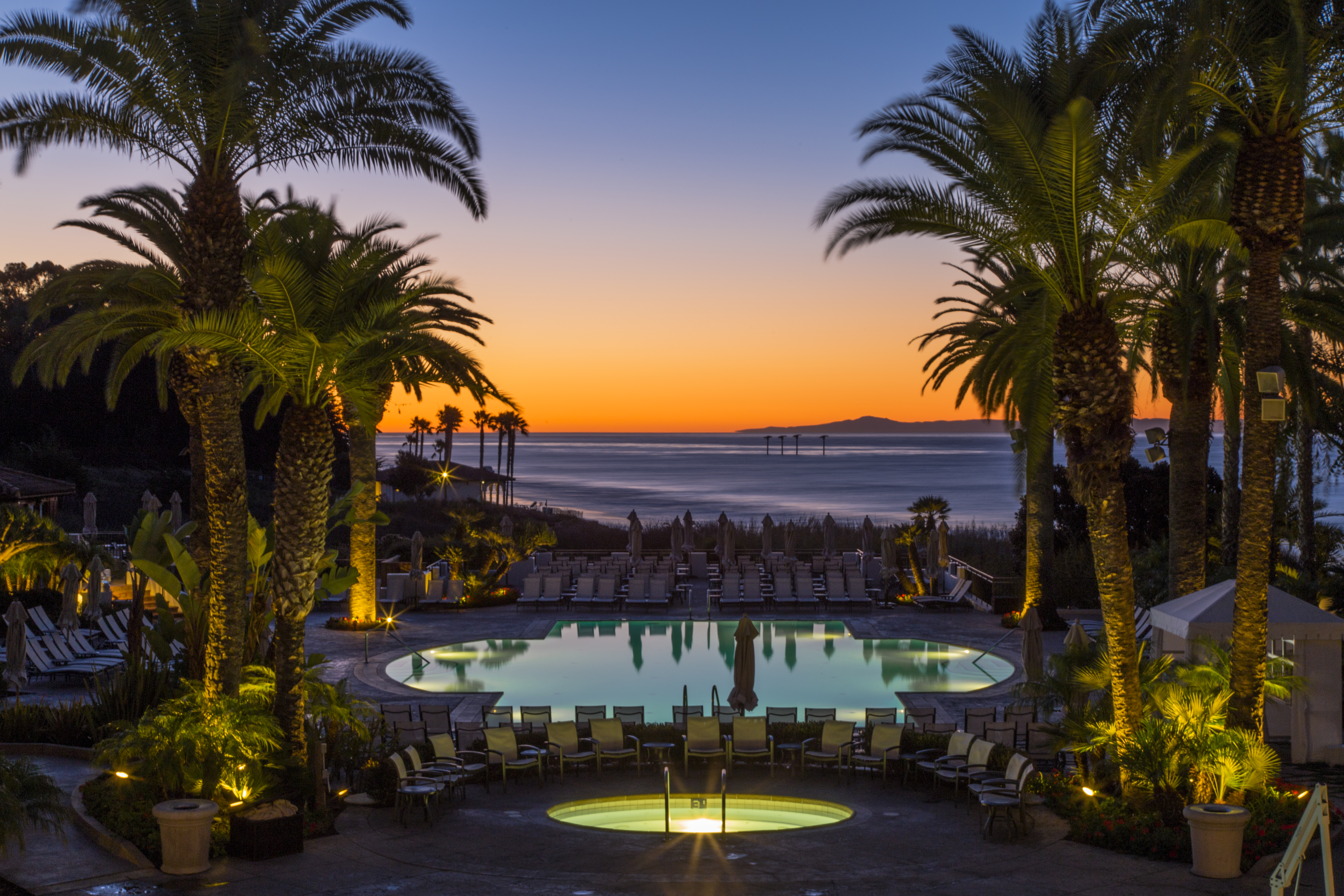
The Ritz-Carlton Bacara Resort

The University of California, Santa Barbara, is the major center of economic activity in the area, both directly and through the numerous associated service industry activities that exist for the staff and students. Hispanic Business had its corporate headquarters in Goleta.

Deckers Outdoor Corporation is based in Goleta. It is the parent company for UGG Australia, Teva, Sanuk, Ahnu, and Hoka One One. Several technology sector businesses operate in the area due to the proximity to the university, including Raytheon, Lockheed Martin, Northrop Grumman, AppFolio, FLIR, and InTouch.

The Bacara Resort, located at the western edge of the city, also employs many residents.

=== Cannabis ===
Following the statewide passage of Proposition 64 in 2016, the city began accepting retail applications on a first-come, first-served basis in August 2018. The city limits the number of recreational retail cannabis businesses to six. In November 2018, the voters of Goleta passed Measure Z-2018, establishing a tax on cannabis business operations within the city. A medical marijuana dispensary was issued the first license for sales of recreational cannabis and began selling in January 2020. Companies must be licensed by the local agency and the state to grow, test, or sell cannabis and the city may authorize none or only some of these activities. Local governments may not prohibit adults, who are in compliance with state laws, from growing, using, or transporting marijuana for personal use.

=== Energy ===
In 2017, the city established an ambitious goal of supplying 100% of the city's municipal facilities and community-wide electricity supply with renewable power by 2030. The city also resolved to have at least 50% of electricity use by municipal facilities come from renewable sources by 2025. In 2019, the city adopted a strategic energy plan as a roadmap on how to accomplish this, which includes switching to Central Coast Community Energy as the default energy provider for its residences and businesses beginning in 2021. The city is currently moving forward with a contract to install solar panels in the parking lot of City Hall in 2021 and exploring future opportunities for electric vehicle (EV) charging stations and a microgrid, which will provide increased resiliency in case of a power disruption.

== Parks and recreation ==
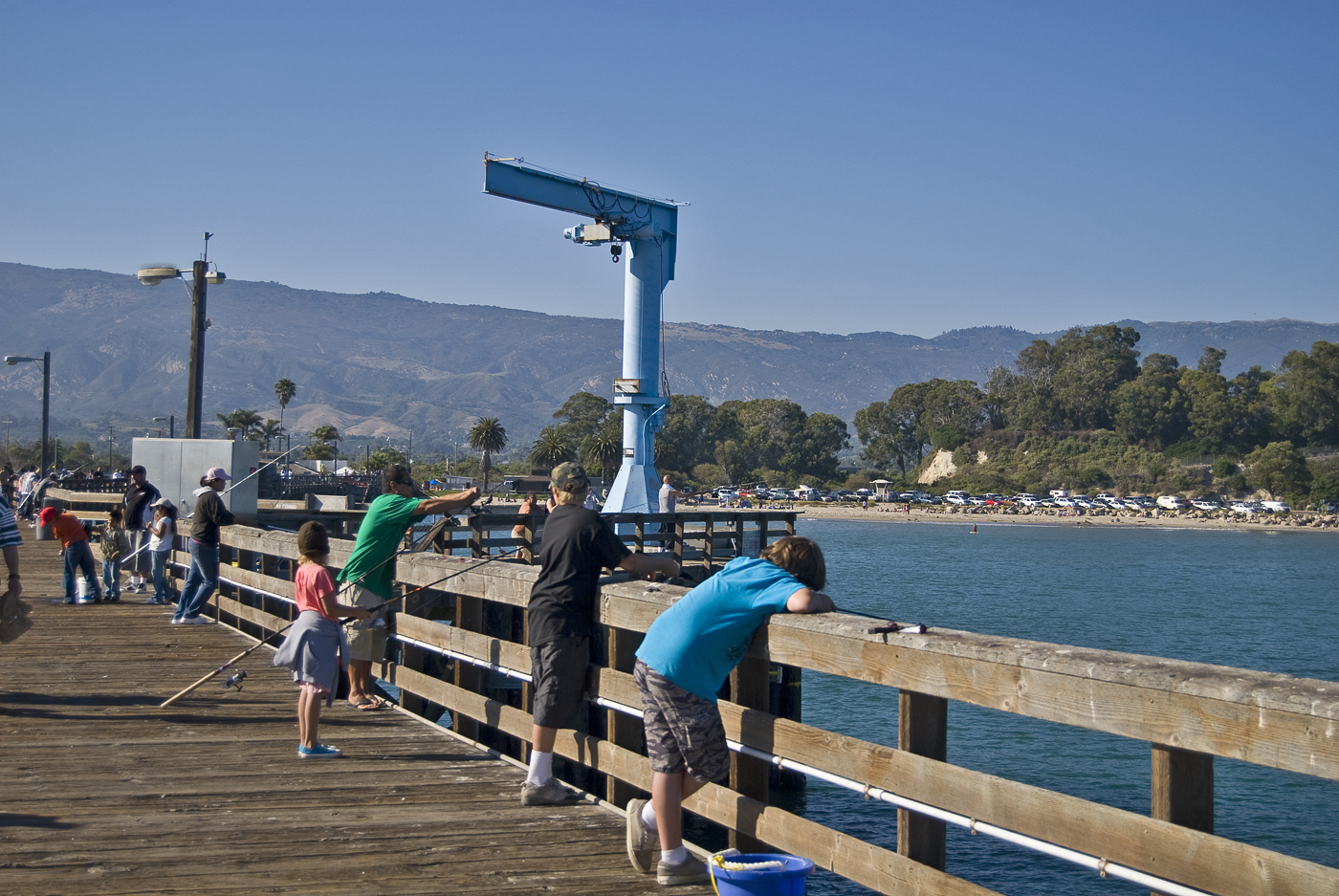
Fishing at Goleta Pier

Goleta has several parks, including Stow Park, Girsh Park, Jonny D. Wallis Neighborhood Park, Lake Los Carneros and Coronado Butterfly preserve, the largest overwintering grove of the Monarch butterfly, providing street access to the Ellwood Mesa Open Space on the bluffs overlooking the Pacific Ocean with beach access from UCSB. Goleta Beach County Park is just outside of the city limits. Historic sites include the Stow House and the South Coast Railroad Museum.

== Government ==
Until 2018, the five city council members took turns as mayor. In November 2018, Paula Perotte was elected to a two-year term as mayor, defeating fellow council member Michael Bennett. This was the first election in city history where residents voted for mayor as opposed to the mayor being selected by city council for a one-year term. The city council also serves as the planning agency. City council, planning commission, and design review board meetings are televised on the local government-access television channel and available on the city's website.

=== Municipal election history ===
Goleta's cityhood was established through Measure H-2001 in the November 2001 election. At this time, the first five members of the city council were also elected, and they officially began their terms on February 1, 2002. Thereafter, the city has held elections during the November general election in even years. Terms of the city council are four years. Until 2018, the mayor was selected by the members of the city council to serve a one-year term. In November 2016, voters approved Measure C-2016, which called for a directly elected mayor with a term of two years, beginning in the next general election (2018). In November 2020, voters approved Measure O-2020, which changed the term of the mayor from two to four years.

Election year	Name	Position	Term	Votes received
2001	Margaret Connell	City Council (beginning February 1, 2002)	5 years	3,479
2001	Jack Hawxhurst	City Council (beginning February 1, 2002)	5 years	3,443
2001	Cynthia Brock	City Council (beginning February 1, 2002)	5 years	3,279
2001	Jean Blois	City Council (beginning February 1, 2002)	3 years	3,158
2001	Jonny Wallis	City Council (beginning February 1, 2002)	3 years	3,017
2004	Jean Blois	City Council	4 years	7,954
2004	Jonny Wallis	City Council	4 years	5,908
2006	Michael Bennett	City Council	4 years	4,770
2006	Eric Onnen	City Council	4 years	4,714
2006	Roger Aceves	City Council	4 years	4,225
2008	Margaret Connell	City Council	4 years	6,344
2008	Ed Easton	City Council	4 years	5,965
2010	Roger Aceves	City Council	4 years	5,969
2010	Michael Bennett	City Council	4 years	5,515
2010	Paula Perotte	City Council	4 years	4,834
2012	Ed Easton	City Council	4 years (*)	7,138
2012	Jim Farr	City Council	4 years	7,074
2014	Roger Aceves	City Council	4 years	(appointed in lieu of election)
2014	Michael Bennett	City Council	4 years	(appointed in lieu of election)
2014	Paula Perotte	City Council	4 years	(appointed in lieu of election)
2016	Stuart Kasdin	City Council	4 years	6,767
2016	Kyle Richards	City Council	4 years	6,524
2018	Paula Perotte	Mayor	2 years	7,590
2018	James Kyriaco	City Council	4 years	7,729
2018	Roger Aceves	City Council	4 years	6,734
2020	Paula Perotte	Mayor	4 years	9,994
2020	Kyle Richards	City Council	4 years	8,965
2020	Stuart Kasdin	City Council	4 years	8,311

(*) Ed Easton stepped down in 2014, and Tony Vallejo was appointed to fill the remainder of his term.

== Education ==
Most local students attend schools in the Goleta Union School District and the Santa Barbara Unified School District. There are also a host of smaller private schools.

=== Schools ===
==== Elementary ====
- Brandon School (within City of Goleta)
- El Camino School
- Ellwood School (within City of Goleta)
- Foothill School
- Goleta Family School
- Hollister School
- Isla Vista School
- Kellogg School (within City of Goleta)
- La Patera School (within City of Goleta)
- Mountain View School
- Santa Barbara Charter School (within City of Goleta)
- South Coast Montessori School of Santa Barbara

==== Secondary ====
- Goleta Valley Junior High
- Dos Pueblos High School

== Transportation ==
Several Santa Barbara Metropolitan Transit District bus lines run through the city. The main artery of the city is U.S. 101, with the major streets being Hollister Avenue and Cathedral Oaks Road. Other significant streets include Calle Real (which is broken into sections), Storke Road/Glen Annie Road, Los Carneros Road, Fairview Avenue, and Patterson Avenue.

Intercity transit is provided by Amtrak at the Goleta Amtrak Station.

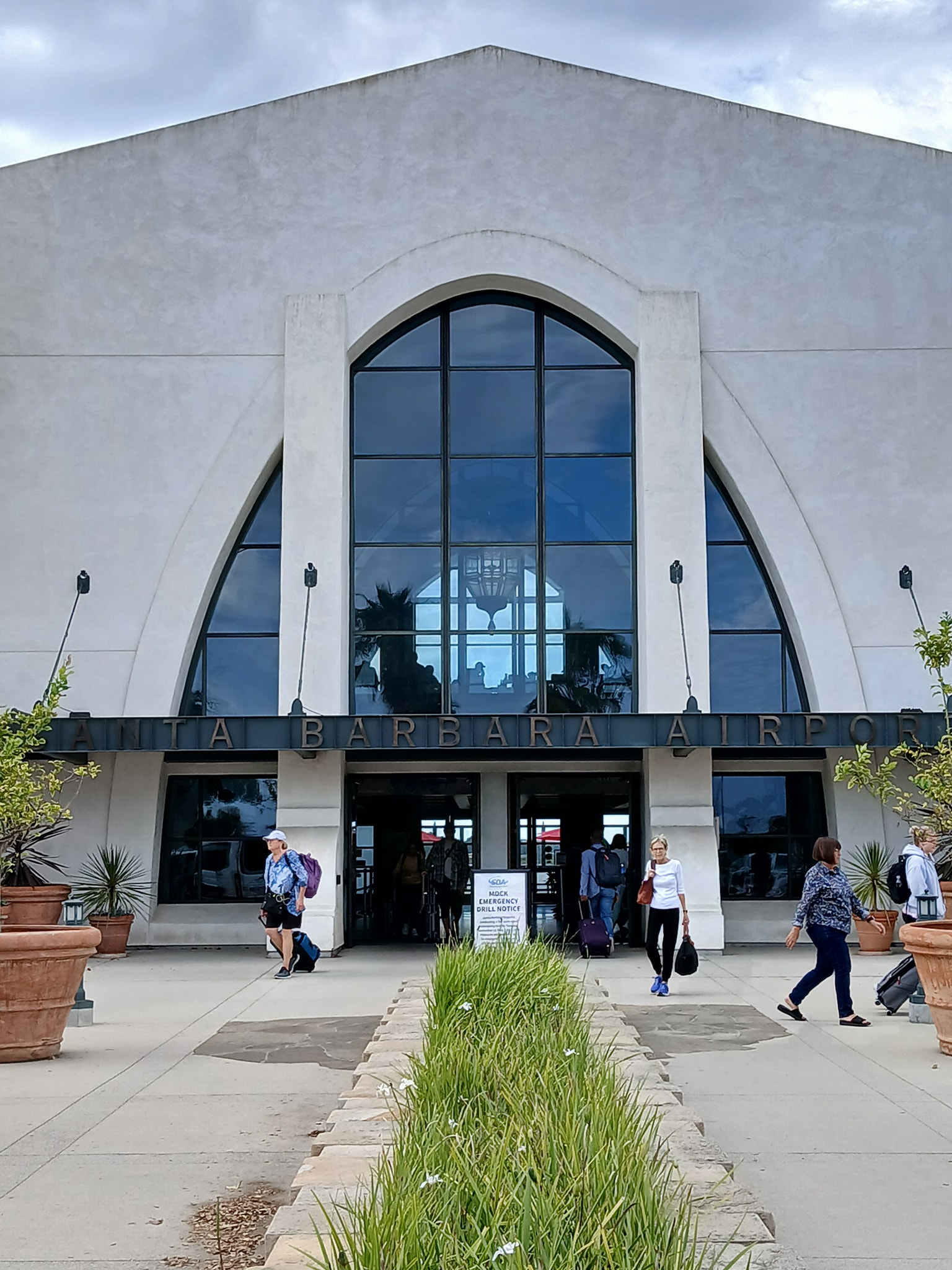
Santa Barbara Airport entrance.

Santa Barbara Airport is adjacent to the City of Goleta, near the intersection of Hollister and South Fairview avenues. The airport serves the greater Santa Barbara area with five airlines connecting to larger hubs.

=== Major highways ===
- U.S. Route 101
- State Route 217

== Notable people ==
- Carl Barks, comics illustrator and writer; known for his comics featuring Donald Duck;creator of Scrooge McDuck; lived in Goleta during the 1970s
- Danny Duffy, professional baseball player in MLB, plays for the Kansas City Royals
- Burnett Guffey, Oscar-winning cinematographer
- Jean Louise Hodgkins (1914–1987) and Vera B. Skubic (1921–1998) built two houses in Del Playa Drive that, with a third one, were historic evidence of the mid-20th century international style presented by architect Richard B. Taylor.
- Lagwagon, melodic punk band
- Kent McClard, owner and operator of Ebullition Records (a hardcore-punk record label) and former publisher of HeartattaCk, an internationally distributed punk zine
- Larry Moriarty, American football, Notre Dame, NFL
- Katy Perry, pop singer
- Derrick William Plourde (1971–2005), drummer, musician, and artist
- Lyric Shen (born 1993), visual artist
- Kim Wilson, blues singer and musician

== See also ==
- Campus Point State Marine Conservation Area
- Dos Pueblos High School
- Goleta Depot
- Goleta Slough
- Goleta Union School District
- History of Santa Barbara, California
- Isla Vista, California
- Santa Barbara, California
- South Coast Railroad Museum
