= Rancho La Goleta =

Land grant in California

Coordinates: 34.440°N 119.810°W

Rancho La Goleta was a 4,426-acre (17.91 km^{2}) Mexican land grant in present-day Santa Barbara County, California given in 1846 by Governor Pío Pico to Daniel A. Hill. The grant extended along the Pacific coast from today’s Fairview Avenue in present-day Goleta, east to Hope Ranch. The grant was adjacent to Rancho Dos Pueblos granted to his son-in-law Nicolas A. Den in 1842.

== History ==
The one square league grant was made to Daniel Antonio Hill in 1846.

With the cession of California to the United States following the Mexican-American War, the 1848 Treaty of Guadalupe Hidalgo provided that the land grants would be honored. As required by the Land Act of 1851, a claim for Rancho La Goleta was filed with the Public Land Commission in 1852, and the grant was patented to Daniel Antonio Hill in 1865.

The California Gold Rush began in 1848, making Hill wealthy from the sale of beef to miners in the gold fields. Daniel Hill first sold 400 acres (2 km^{2}) of Rancho La Goleta to his son-in-law, T. Wallace More, in 1856, and an additional 1,000 acres (4 km^{2}) in 1864. The deaths of Den in 1862 and Hill in 1865, and the droughts of 1863 and 1864, led to the first subdivisions of the rancho.

== Daniel A. Hill ==
Daniel A. Hill (1797–1865), of Billerica, Massachusetts, came to California from Hawaii in 1823, and settled in Santa Barbara, and married Rafaela Sabina Luisa Ortega (1809–1879) in 1826. She was the granddaughter of José Francisco Ortega, grantee of Rancho Nuestra Señora del Refugio. Hill was a man of varied accomplishments—carpenter, stonemason, soap-maker, and farmer. He engaged in merchandising, and also acted as a superintendent for the padres in some of their farming and building operations. He built several houses, including the 1825 Hill-Carrillo Adobe, now listed the National Register of Historic Places listings in Santa Barbara County, California. He was the grantee of Rancho La Goleta, where he died in 1865. His daughter Rosa A. Hill married Nicholas A. Den; daughter Josefa G. Hill married Alexander Smith Taylor; daughter Susana Hill married T. Wallace More; and daughter Maria Antonia married H. O'Neill; and his son Ramon J. Hill was a state senator.

== See also ==
- Ranchos of California
- List of Ranchos of California
