= Atascadero Creek (Santa Barbara County, California) =

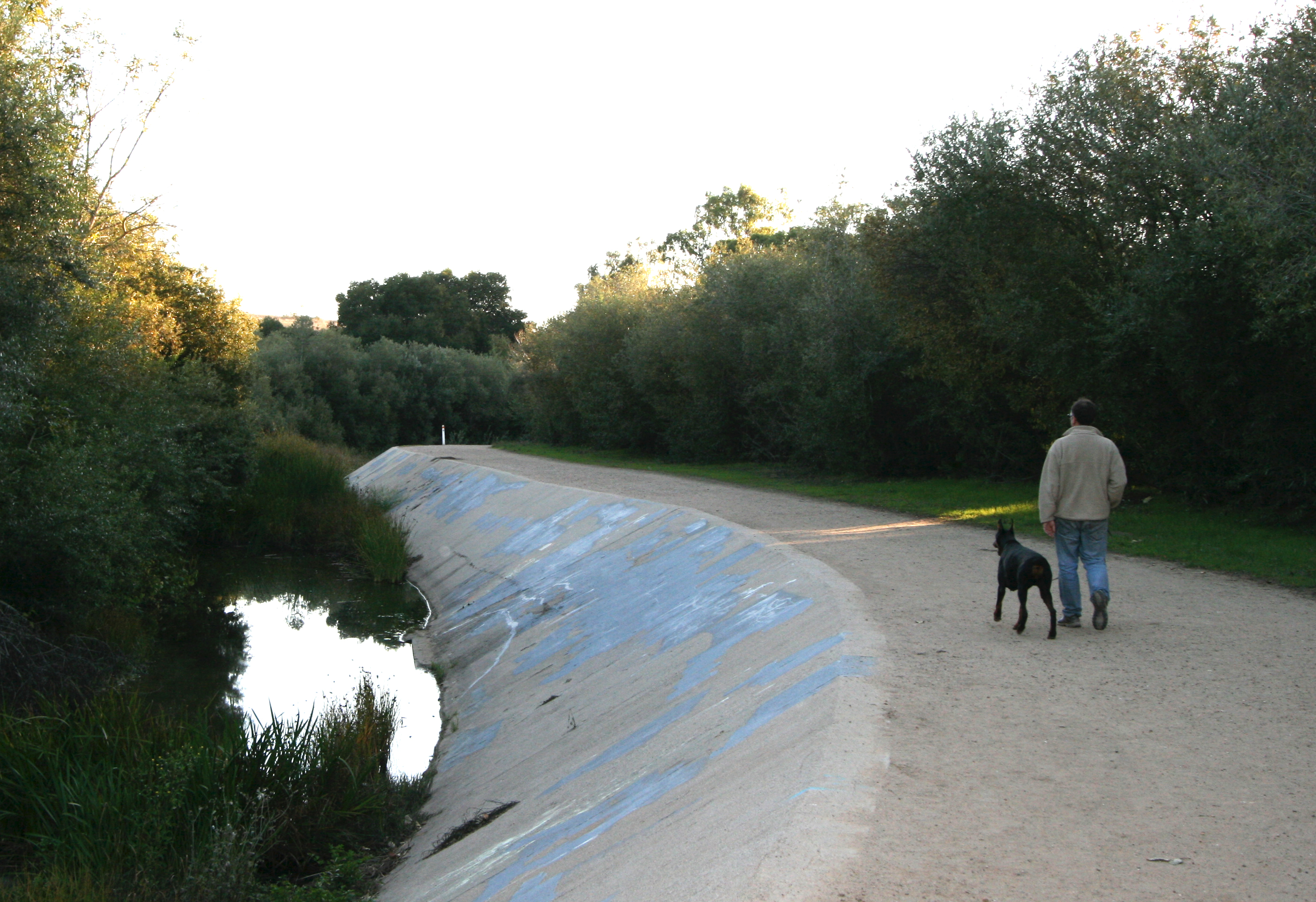
- Along the north edge of More Mesa

- Location of the mouth in California
- Etymology: Spanish

Location
- Country: United States
- State: California
- Region: Santa Barbara County

Physical characteristics
- Source
  - location: Top of Atascadero Canyon, Santa Ynez Mountains
  - coordinates: 34°28′05″N 119°45′43″W
  - elevation: 540 ft (160 m)
- Mouth: Goleta Slough
  - coordinates: 34°25′11″N 119°49′45″W
  - elevation: 7 ft (2.1 m)
- Discharge
  - location: More Ranch Road, Goleta, California
  - average: 6.31 cu ft/s (0.179 m^{3}/s)
  - minimum: 0 cu ft/s (0 m^{3}/s)
  - maximum: 979 cu ft/s (27.7 m^{3}/s)

Atascadero Creek is a southwest flowing stream in Santa Barbara County, California, United States which empties into the Goleta Slough.

== Course ==
Atascadero Creek forms in Atascadero Canyon just east of California State Route 154 (San Marcos Pass Rd.) in Santa Barbara, California. The creek runs south and joins Cieneguitas creek which flows into it from the east. It then curves west at the base of Hope Ranch and defines the northern edge of More Mesa. As it heads west several other southern flowing canyon creeks westward of Atascadero canyon flow into it including Hospital Creek and Maria Ygnacio Creek (which includes the waters of San Antonio Creek). It then joins with the outflow from the Goleta Slough, adjacent to Mescalitan Island, and empties into the Pacific Ocean at Goleta Beach County Park.

== History ==
Since the area just north of the creek as it runs west is part of modern-day Goleta and Noleta it shares their history as being farmed by the Chumash Indians, used as grazing for cattle and becoming popular citrus farmland. Gradually after World War II the citrus groves were converted into housing. Today a popular coastal bike path runs adjacent to the creek through most of its westerly course to Goleta Beach and on to the University of California Santa Barbara (UCSB).

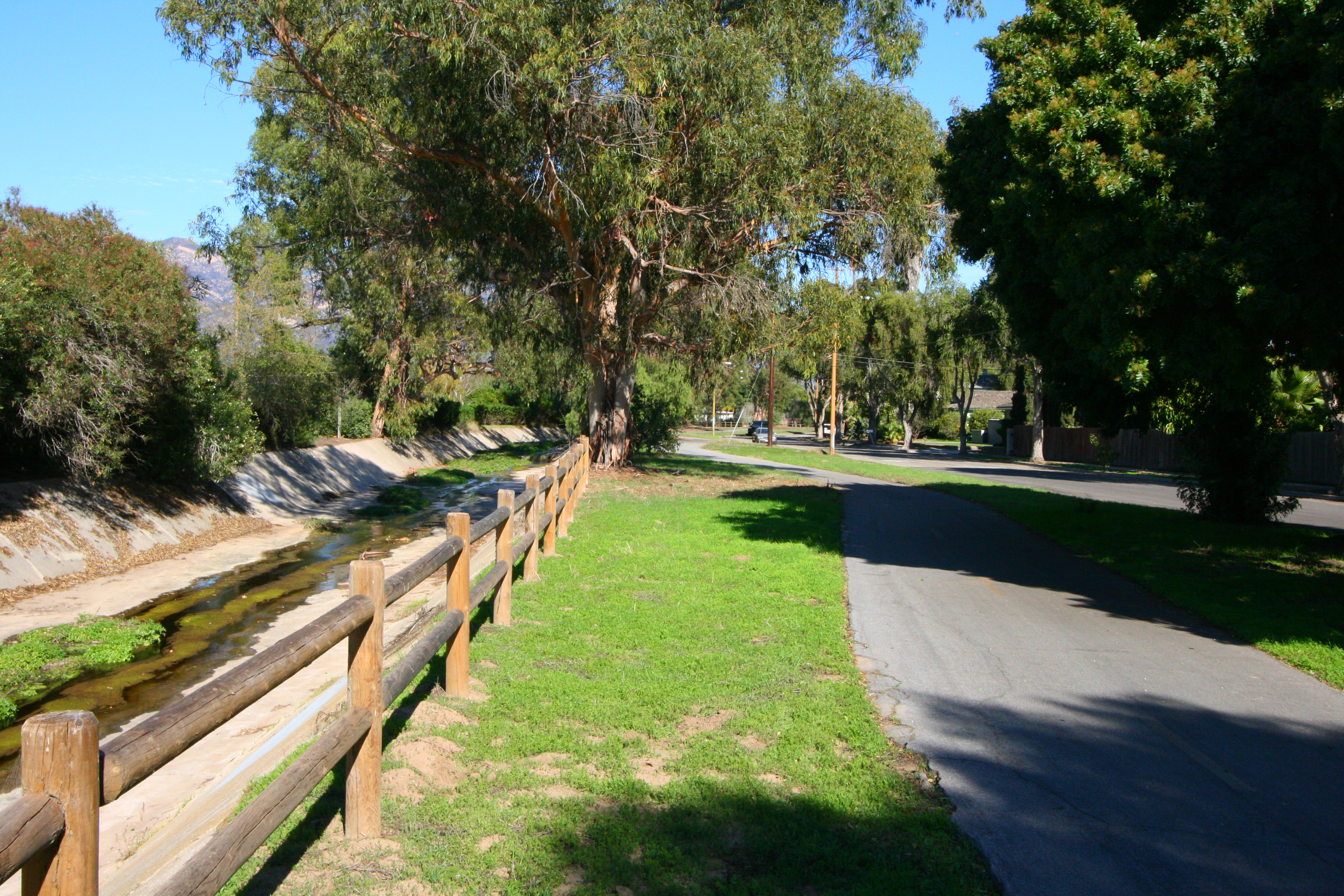
View of Atascadero Creek looking east from Puente Street in Santa Barbara.

== See also ==
- List of rivers in California
