= San Marcos High School (Santa Barbara, California) =

High school in Santa Barbara, California

Location
- 4750 Hollister Avenue; Santa Barbara, California, 93110; United States; 34.4375°N 119.7872°W

Information
- School type: Public, high school
- Established: 1958; 68 years ago
- School district: Santa Barbara Unified School District
- Principal: Dare Holdren
- Teaching staff: 91.02 (FTE)
- Grades: 9-12
- Enrollment: 1,926 (2024-2025)
- Student to teacher ratio: 21.16
- Campus: Suburban
- Colors: Scarlet; Royal Blue
- Athletics conference: CIF Southern Section; Channel League
- Nickname: Royals
- Rivals: Santa Barbara High School; Dos Pueblos High School
- Publication: Crown and Sceptre
- Website: Official website

San Marcos High School is a public high school located in Eastern Goleta Valley (also known as Noleta), between Santa Barbara and Goleta, California. Accredited through the Western Association of Schools and Colleges, the school was named a California Distinguished School in 1994 and 2005, and a Gold Ribbon School in 2015.

== History ==
San Marcos High School was established in 1958.

The campus was first located at the Rivera Theater campus on Alameda Padre Serra for the 1958-59 school year. Only freshmen (ref yearbook 1959) and sophomores comprised the first group of students. The campus moved to its current location for the 1959-60 school year at 4750 Hollister Avenue. Only sophomores and juniors comprised the second group of students. For the 1960–61 school year, San Marcos had three full grade levels and also its first graduating class.

== Student body ==
As of 2024-25, San Marcos High School enrolls 1,926 ninth through twelfth grade students from a diverse variety of economic and ethnic backgrounds from the Santa Barbara community.

Student Ethnicity
Ethnicity	Percentage
Hispanic / Latino	60.5%
White	32.0%
Asian	2.4%
African American	0.5%
American Indian / Alaskan Native	0.1%
Native Hawaiian / Pacific Islander	0.2%
Two or more races	4.4%

The student body is classified as follows: 50.7% of students are "Socioeconomically Disadvantaged", 9.4% of students are "English Learners" and 14.1% of student are "Students with Disabilities". Exit survey results from the Class of 2014 indicated that 93% of graduates will continue their education, with approximately 39% of those graduates attending a 4-year institution, and 54% attending a 2-year institution.

== Curriculum ==
San Marcos operates on a 4 X 4 Block Schedule, with four terms per year. Each class period is approximately 90 minutes in length. A full schedule is considered three classes per term. Final grades and credits are given each term, which equates to a semester under other systems. In order to graduate, students are required to complete a minimum of 220 units/credits and to pass the California High School Exit Examination. In addition to these academic requirements, all students are required to complete 60 hours of community service for graduation.

Weighted grades are given in Honors, AP and Dual Enrollment courses, the most rigorous classes offered at the school. Honors classes are offered in core courses in grades 9-11. AP courses are taken primarily by juniors and seniors. AP course offerings include American Government, Biology, Chemistry, Economics, Computer Science, English Language, English Literature, Environmental Science, European History, French, Latin, Psychology, Physics, Studio Art, Art History, U.S. History and World History. English, Calculus, Statistics, Spanish Language, Environmental Horticulture, Latin, Professional Development, Certified Nursing Assistant, Medical Terminology, Marketing (Entrepreneurship) and Auto classes are also offered on campus as Santa Barbara City College (SBCC) dual enrollment courses. College credit and a weighted grade are given to students who successfully complete these courses. Students may also complete required coursework through Dual Enrollment courses on the SBCC campus.

San Marcos also offers several well-respected Academy programs. Students enrolled in the Health Careers Academy take a core health class followed by a curriculum of related Santa Barbara City College classes taught on campus. Students in the Health Careers Academy also have the opportunity to become a Certified Nursing Assistant during their senior year. The Accelerated Academic Program for Leadership and Enrichment (AAPLE) is a program designed to offer the most rigorous 4 year academic pathway while simultaneously providing hands-on, enrichment opportunities for a group of the highest achieving students. The Entrepreneurship Academy is a three-year program that provides students who wish to start their own business with the necessary knowledge and skills in a course that includes experience in local business community partnerships and student run business ventures. 2014 saw the start of a Culinary Program. The Program for Effective Access to College (PEAC), is an academic program for first-generation college bound students, that provides them resources such as after school tutoring, college counseling, college trips, and mentoring. Students in PEAC are also enrolled in AVID (Advancement Via Individual Determination) for one semester each school year. A staffed Career Center offers guidance programs including The Majors Program, job shadowing and internships. All San Marcos students are encouraged to attend college and are counseled to follow a college preparatory track that will fulfill the course requirements for admission to the University of California system. Students are required to complete a 10-year Plan, focusing on college and career goals.

San Marcos High School, Santa Barbara, CA.

== Distinctions ==
San Marcos was named a California Distinguished School in 2005. The school has received awards and distinctions in many fields, including:

- The Royals Marching Band – 1st at the SCSBOA 1A championships in 2008.
- The San Marcos dance team, the Marquettes – national champions.
- The mock trial team – state champions
- The school newspaper, The King's Page – First Place with Special Merit in the American Scholastic Press Association newspaper contest in 2002 – 2003.
- The Academic Decathlon team – county champions .
- The Varsity Girls Soccer Team – CIF, City, and Channel League Champions.
- The Golf program – multiple CIF championships.
- The San Marcos Madrigal Singers – one of four groups accepted to perform in the Carnegie Hall National Choral Festival.
- The San Marcos varsity football team – City Champions of Santa Barbara.
- The San Marcos Varsiy Cheerleading Team- state champions in 2016 at the Cheer Pros Cheerleading Competition in Ontario, California.

== Charity work ==
Students in the AP Economics classes have put on the annual "Kids Helping Kids event," which has raised hundreds of thousands of dollars for various charities. Celebrities, bands, artists, etc. contribute and donate to this event, held at the Granada Theater. In recent years benefit concert headliners have included Andy Grammer, Need to Breathe, and Gavin Degraw.

== Mascot and colors ==
The mascot is Lancelot the Lion, a lion wearing a cape and crown. The school colors and royal blue and scarlet red.

== Logo history ==
The San Marcos logo originated from the head football coach in 1970, Satini Puailoa III's father.

== Notable alumni ==
- Eric Anzalone, member of Village People, singer/actor/author
- Colleen Ballinger, comedian, singer, internet personality
- Laura Bialis, filmmaker
- Brook Billings, volleyball player
- Sue DiCicco, artist
- Dean Dinning, bassist for Toad the Wet Sprocket
- Adam Duvendeck, Olympic cyclist, General Manager Dignity Health Sports Park
- Anthony Edwards, actor
- Jeff Glover, submission wrestler, Brazilian Jiu-Jitsu black belt.
- Paige Hauschild, Olympic water polo player
- Dax Holdren, volleyball player
- Cady Huffman, actress, Tony Award winner
- Kathy Ireland, model, actress
- James Kiffe, professional soccer player
- John La Puma, internist, professionally trained chef, author
- Mark W. Lee, author
- Chuck Liddell, wrestler and football player; retired professional MMA fighter, former UFC Light Heavyweight Champion and UFC Hall of Fame member
- Tim Lopez, guitarist for Plain White T's
- Alex Mack, American football player
- Randolph Mantooth, actor
- Todd Nichols, guitarist for Toad the Wet Sprocket
- Robert C. Orr, Assistant-Secretary General, United Nations
- Steve Pate, professional golfer
- Glen Phillips, lead singer and songwriter of Toad the Wet Sprocket
- Tom Rainey, professional drummer
- Sam Randolph, professional golfer
- Brandon Richards, national high school record-holder in the pole vault
- Todd Rogers, Olympic volleyball player
- Terry Schroeder, head coach of the United States men's national water polo team
- Lala Sloatman, actress
- Eric Stoltz, actor
- Sam Strong (soccer), professional soccer player and former u23 national team player
- Bradlee Van Pelt, professional football player
- Mark Warkentin, Olympic swimmer
- Mike Wilton, head coach of the Hawaii Rainbow Warriors volleyball team, University of Hawaii at Manoa
- Gary Woods, professional baseball player
- Robert Stratton, professional baseball player
