= Atascadero Creek =

Atascadero Creek may refer to:

- Atascadero Creek (Santa Barbara County, California) a stream in Santa Barbara County, California
- Atascadero Creek (Sonoma County, California) a stream in Sonoma County, California
