= Singapore Business Federation =

Apex Business Chamber in Singapore

- Abbreviation: SBF
- Predecessor: Singapore Federation of Chambers of Commerce and Industry
- Established: 1 April 2002; 24 years ago
- Headquarters: SBF Centre
- Location: 160 Robinson Road, Singapore #06-01
- Members: 27,200 (2020)
- Chairman: Mark Lee
- CEO: Kok Ping Soon
- Website: www.sbf.org.sg

Singapore Business Federation (Abbreviation: SBF; Chinese: 新加坡工商联合总会; Malay: Persekutuan Perniagaan Singapura; Tamil: சிங்கப்பூர் தொழில் சம்மேளனம்) is the apex business chamber in Singapore. SBF aims to improve the organisation of the business community in Singapore and represent it both locally and abroad.

SBF was formed on 1 April 2002 as the successor to the Singapore Federation of Chambers of Commerce and Industry, which had consisted of five business chambers and associations in Singapore. SBF has compulsory membership, unlike its predecessor which had struggled financially as a result of voluntary membership. As of December 2020, SBF has 27,200 members, including both companies and business chambers. SBF carries out events such as talks and dialogue sessions for its members, and provides them with various business networks.

On 7 November 2024, SBF unveiled their refreshed identity and tagline, "Mobilising Business, Magnifying Opportunities", in a bid to reach out to more businesses. SBF also started an Honorary Advisory Panel, tapping on past leaders to seek guidance on the organisation's strategies.

On 24 June 2026, Mark Lee was elected chairman of the Singapore Business Federation, succeeding Teo Siong Seng, whose term ended the same day. Lee, the chief executive officer of Sing Lun Holdings and a Nominated Member of Parliament, had previously served as SBF's vice-chairman and treasurer, and was elected by the newly formed SBF council for a two-year term from 2026 to 2028.
