= Noleta =

Unincorporated area in Santa Barbara County, California, United States

Coordinates: 34.43661°N 119.78934°W

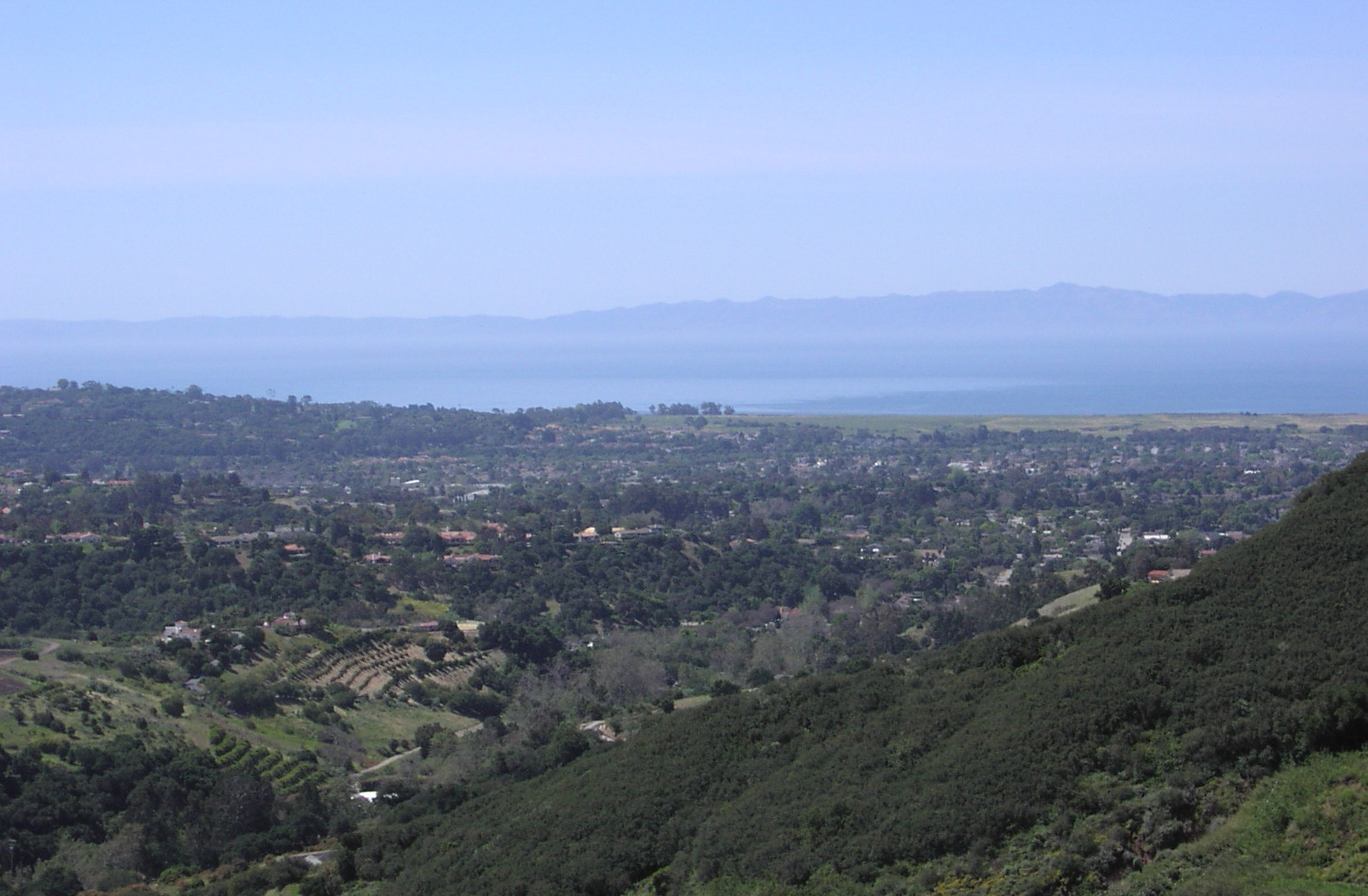
The "Noleta" area, looking south from the lower slopes of the Santa Ynez Mountains

Noleta is an unofficial name used to designate the unincorporated urban area between Goleta and Santa Barbara in California, United States. It is bounded on the east by Santa Barbara and Hope Ranch, on the west by Goleta, on the north by the Santa Ynez Mountains and on the south by the Pacific Ocean, and largely includes the zip codes 93105, 93110, and 93111. Approximately 30,000 people live in the area.

The area is called Noleta because of its history of voting "no" on incorporation with the City of Goleta (i.e. "no" to "Goleta"), and as a pun on the more famous neighborhood "North of Little Italy" in New York City. As it is unincorporated, the area is under county government administration. While Noleta has a history of voting "no" on incorporation, neither the City of Santa Barbara nor Goleta have attempted to annex the Noleta area. Both communities are reluctant to absorb the community because the area's tax base does not generate enough revenue to pay for the services it requires. Nevertheless, both cities compete to influence the community.

The reluctance of "Noleta-ers" to incorporate is largely based on a variety of reasons including:

- reluctance to have a Goleta address
- reluctance of some home owners to incur the regulatory restrictions of either Goleta or Santa Barbara
- differing views on the numbers, density and siting of new housing in the area.

As an unincorporated area of Santa Barbara County, residents are addressed by the US Postal Service as Santa Barbara. The area comprises the census designated place of Eastern Goleta Valley and includes Hope Ranch and San Marcos High School.

== 2005 events ==
The struggle between Goleta and Santa Barbara to include the area within their sphere of influence, usually the first step towards eventual annexation, took a new twist in May 2005, when residents of the area presented a petition to Santa Barbara City Hall with 4,150 signatures, requesting inclusion in Santa Barbara's sphere of influence. Goleta officials declared in June that they had no intention of serving people outside their official city boundaries, as opposed to Santa Barbara, which did. On September 1, 2005, the issue of the future sphere of influence over the "Noleta" area was discussed by the Santa Barbara City Council at City Hall in Santa Barbara.

On August 24, 2005, the Santa Barbara City Council unanimously backed a proposal to put the area officially under the city's sphere of influence. The only opposition to the proposal came from residents of mobile homes in the area, who worry that they could lose their rent protection, which they have under Santa Barbara County rules, but would potentially disappear under Santa Barbara City rules.

The petition drive to get Noleta included in the Santa Barbara sphere of influence was led by two committees, the "West Santa Barbara Committee" and the "Committee of One."

Prior to the 2008 recession, pressure to build new housing in the area had been intense, due to two reasons: the area contained the largest number of undeveloped parcels on the South Coast, and there was a general lack of affordable housing in the Santa Barbara area, as the median home price in 2005 had reached approximately 1.3 million dollars. In mid-October 2005, the Santa Barbara County Board of Supervisors authorized $43,000 to fund a growth outline for the area. Several large-scale housing projects were proposed by the county in the Noleta area, which were opposed by many local residents due to traffic and quality-of-life concerns.
