= Goleta Beach =

Coastline near Santa Barbara, California

- Beach
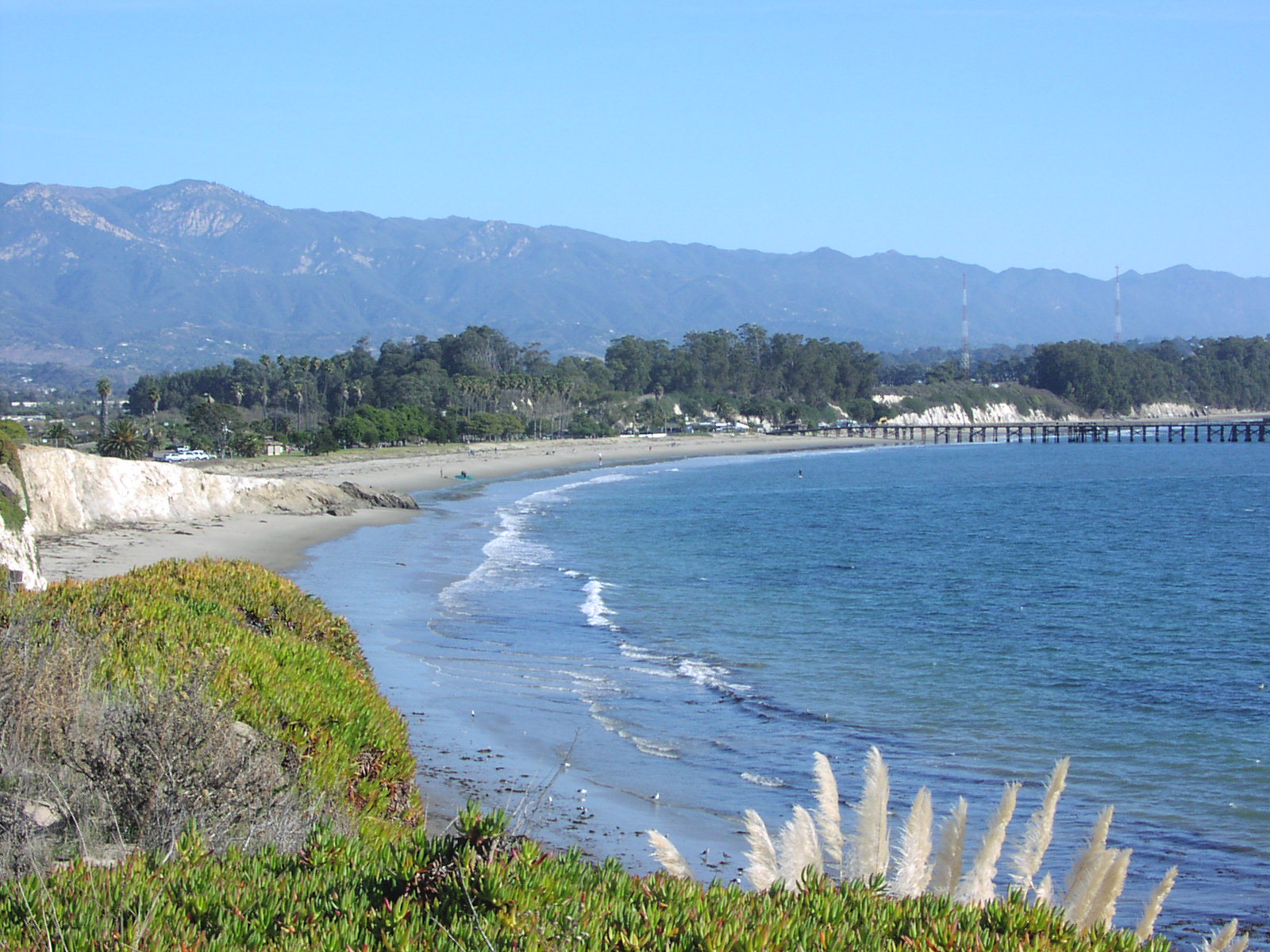
- Goleta Beach County Park, with the Pacific Ocean in the foreground and the Santa Ynez Mountains in the distance
- Interactive map of Goleta Beach
- Coordinates: 34.4147°N 119.8378°W
- Location: Goleta, California
- Water bodies: Pacific Ocean

Dimensions
  - Length: 0.97 miles (1.56 km)

Goleta Beach is a region of coastline located near Goleta, California, just east of the University of California, Santa Barbara (UCSB) campus. A portion of the shore of Goleta Bay is managed by the County of Santa Barbara, as the Goleta Beach County Park (GBCP). The beach itself is partly man-made as sand was spread onto an existing sandspit in 1945. The beach is a seasonal habitat for migrating shorebirds, including the snowy plover, an endangered species, and is occasionally closed due to nourishment efforts.

== Elements ==
=== Slough and wetlands ===
Goleta Slough is a nearby tidal estuary that empties into the Pacific Ocean. The slough drains the Goleta Valley and watershed, and receives the water of all of the major creeks in the Goleta area, including the southern face of the Santa Ynez Mountains. The slough ecosystem has been affected by the numerous berms and tide gates that alter tidal circulation (Audubon, 2003).

The Goleta Slough wetlands once covered approximately 1,150 acres (465 ha); however, the current size is about 440 acres (180 ha). Most of the habitat conversion occurred in the early 1940s, when a small airport was expanded to accommodate an airfield for the Marine Corps Air Station Santa Barbara, located immediately south of the estuary on what is now the University of California at Santa Barbara campus. After the war, that airfield became the Santa Barbara Municipal Airport. Groups, such as the Sierra Club and Audubon Society, have been especially concerned regarding the flora and fauna in the Goleta Slough and its surrounding uplands. The UCSB student-supported and student-led Coastal Fund has worked with the Goleta Slough Management Committee, to conduct minor ecological restoration, such as the removal of non-native plants. The Goleta Slough Management Committee has been a vocal supporter of the California Coastal Conservancy’s plans for a major restoration project that would allow an experimental opening prior to a return to tidal circulation, in at least one of the marshland basins. It was able to secure approval from the Federal Aviation Administration to go ahead with the experiment as the action may affect the Santa Barbara Airport.

=== Park ===
The park is a day-use park (open from 8:00 am to sunset) that features 27 picnic tables, four horseshoe pits, three restrooms, a volleyball court and other amenities. The park once featured a “Windamajig”, an active wind animated art piece sculpture. Unfortunately, the art installation was damaged by strong winds in 2006 and removed. The park itself is 29 acres (12 ha) large and 4,200 feet (1,300 m) of beach are included in the domain (Kisner, 1998). The pier, More’s Landing, was first built in 1874 and further modifications were done in the late 1920s, by the federal Department of Forestry (Kisner, 1998). The Beachside Restaurant closed in February 2021. The park is popular with locals and tourists alike and receives about 1.5 million visitors per year, making it the most heavily used park in the Santa Barbara County Park system (SBCPD, 2003). The park provides 580 parking spaces, as many visitors arrive by car, via Highway 217.

=== The western point ===
The base of the point is described as “a rocky intertidal habitat, although species present there are more like those [found near] pier pilings” (Kisner, 1998). Freshwater seeps and some exposed pipes drain from the UCSB campus nearby the point. Most importantly, the rocky point and surrounding bluffs suffer from serious erosion most often associated with El Nino events. The shape of the bay focuses wave energy at the location. Because of the erosion, the edge of the bluffs above has become somewhat unstable and may be dangerous for those walking nearby.

== History ==
The estuary mouth fluctuated along the beach while 40,000 years of coastal uplift raised the mesa to the east and west. Since the late 19th century, Santa Barbara residents have been modifying the Goleta Beach area. Cattle grazing in the watershed begun in 1846 and fires caused hillsides to erode and fill parts of the Goleta Slough with sediment. In the early 20th century, local landowners invited citizens to bring fill to the beach on which a state beach park was established. Meanwhile, in 1943 the federal government continued the filling of the estuary when it bulldozed the historic Mescalitan Island just inside the estuary to create an airbase for use during World War II (SBCPD, 2003). In the 1960s, further construction continued on the wetlands including a sewage treatment facility and California Highway 217, and the state park was turned over to Santa Barbara County.

== Erosion ==
An ongoing problem concerning Goleta Beach is coastal erosion; sand and sediment is constantly being washed away and the beach is narrowing. In fact, in the last 14 years, the beach has been eroding at an average rate of 20 feet (6 m)-per-year. If no action is taken, the park, which consists of outdoor grills, horseshoe pits, a playground, public restrooms and shower, five parking lots and other county-maintained facilities (SBCPD, 2006), as well as the restaurant building is in danger of being lost. However, some proposed solutions designed to absorb wave energy and prevent erosion — particularly the so-called “hard engineering” solutions — may increase erosion elsewhere or alter the south central coast littoral cell.

A number of plans have been proposed by different stakeholders and they generally fall under three broader philosophies. The first belief is that the park must be saved at all costs and supporters have argued for “hard engineering” coastal defense. A second group of stakeholders on the opposite extreme of the spectrum calls for managed retreat where existing utilities and structures are ripped out and nature is allowed to take its course. A third option, a moderate compromise suggests that the current ‘soft’ beach nourishment strategy is worth continuing.

=== Coastal defense ===
The structural proposals consist of numerous strategies. One possible structure is a breakwater. Breakwaters are placed a few hundred feet offshore and create a harbor. Unfortunately, a breakwater would likely adversely affect littoral drift and the creation of a Goleta Bay harbor is probably too extreme. Another strategy is the installation of groynes (or groins), wood or concrete ‘fences’ that stretch out into the ocean, perpendicular to the beach. Groynes cause sediment to build up on one side but have the unhelpful consequence of preventing sediment to accumulate on the other side.

Another structure proposed is a seawall. A seawall is a concrete wall placed against the base of bluffs or sea cliffs that runs parallel to the ocean. While a sea wall may appear to be stopping erosion, a seawall can only diffuse wave energy which means that the areas on either side of the wall are likely to experience accelerated erosion. Again, this is not desired as the UCSB mesa might be adversely affected.

A fourth type of structure is a revetment. A revetment is similar to a seawall but usually consists of boulders piled at the base of cliffs. While it is less likely to accelerate erosion to either side, the area in front of a revetment may suffer. Sediment that would normally have been deposited on the beach instead bounces off the rocks and is dispersed elsewhere.

=== Managed retreat ===
Some organizations of users, such as the Surfrider Foundation, have called for managed retreat. Scientists and coastal engineers know that hard structures cause greater erosion of the beach sand. This option would protect coastal resources while preserving park amenities by reconfiguring them. There is no evidence that the current protection measures currently in place have caused the erosion of beach sand at either Goleta Beach or any down coast beaches. The California Coastal Commission permits armoring in order to protect public access and recreational uses. This beach is visited by over 1.4 million visitors annually.

=== Beach nourishment ===
A third strategy is that of beach nourishment (a ‘soft’ approach). Nourishment consists of depositing sand on top of the beach in order to expand its width. This approach is not extremely expensive and is already being done at Goleta Beach. In addition to the direct transporting of sand to the beach, it would also be helpful if sediment built up in upriver basins (behind dams) be removed and placed slightly downstream to be naturally washed down to the ocean. The mouth of the slough should be kept open by periodic dredging as blockage causes eutrophication.

The Northern Gold Coast Beach Protection Strategy is an example of a successful execution of this technique. Between 1992 and 1999, the Gold Coast City Council worked with experts on a proposed plan to stop beach erosion. Options originally considered included groynes, breakwaters, and others but the City Council finally chose to dredge sediment from the nearby Gold Coast Broadwater, pump it through large pipes, and deposit it along five kilometers of coast. In addition, they planned a near-shore artificial reef to protect the project. Between 1999 and 2000, the plan was carried out with 1.1 million cubic meters of sediment being transported from the Broadwater to the beach (Jackson, 2004). Further dredging of nearby areas provided sand that was used to fill large geotextile sandbags that were dropped nearshore to create the reef. Since then, the beach has been monitored with coastal imaging technology and has fared well. Due to the significant differences in the coastline and tidal conditions, this alternative may not be applicable at Goleta Beach.

The area in dispute is currently fully armored with large boulders to the west of the restaurant building and has been so for a number of years. Another option on this project is to request the Coastal Commission to permit the existing rocks. There is no scientific evidence that the current protective measures have resulted in loss of sand to down coast beaches.

== See also ==
- Coastal erosion
- Coastal management
