= Mark Lee =

Mark Lee may refer to:

== Arts and entertainment ==
=== Film and television ===
- Mark Lee (Australian actor) (born 1958), Australian actor and director
- Mark Lee (Singaporean actor) (born 1968), Singaporean actor, comedian and director
- Mark Lee (Taiwanese actor) or Lee Tien-chu (born 1956), Taiwanese actor
- Mark Lee Ping-bing (born 1954), Taiwanese cinematographer

=== Other arts and entertainment ===
- Mark Lee (singer) (born 1999), Canadian rapper and singer
- Mark David Lee (born 1973), American musician and guitarist
- Mark W. Lee, American novelist, playwright and journalist
- Mark Lee, member of Village People 1982–1985

== Sports ==
- Mark Lee (American football) (born 1958), former NFL player
- Mark Lee (Australian rules footballer) (born 1959), Australian rules footballer
- Mark Lee (left-handed pitcher) (born 1964), American baseball pitcher (1988–1995)
- Mark Lee (right-handed pitcher) (born 1953), American baseball pitcher (1978–1981)
- Mark Lee (footballer, born 1979), English football player
- Mark Lee (ice hockey) (born 1984), Canadian ice hockey player
- Mark Lee (rugby league) (born 1968), rugby league footballer
- Mark Lee (sportscaster), Canadian sportscaster
- Mark Lee (runner), Singaporean runner

== Other people ==
- Mark Lee (architect), Chinese-American architect
- Mark C. Lee (born 1952), American astronaut
- Mark Owen Lee or M. Owen Lee (1930–2019), American classics and music scholar and Roman Catholic priest

== See also ==
- Marc Lee (born 1969), Swiss new media artist
- Marc Alan Lee (1978–2006), United States Navy SEAL
- Marc Lee (politician), American politician
