= Alex Mack =

American football player (born 1985)

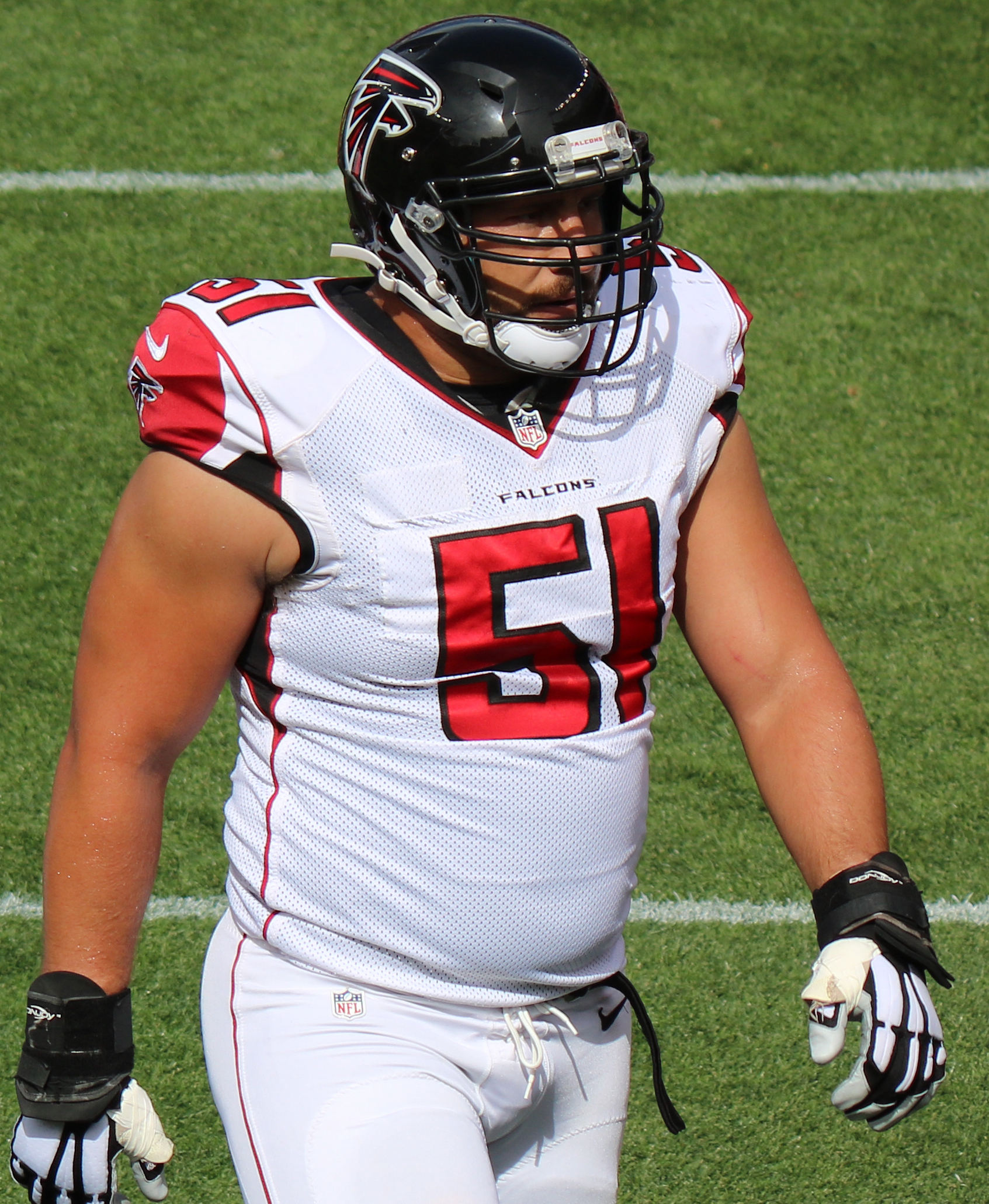
- Mack with the Atlanta Falcons in 2016

No. 55, 51, 50
- Position: Center

Personal information
- Born: November 19, 1985 (age 40); Los Angeles, California, U.S.
- Listed height: 6 ft 4 in (1.93 m)
- Listed weight: 311 lb (141 kg)

Career information
- High school: San Marcos (Santa Barbara, California)
- College: California (2004–2008)
- NFL draft: 2009: 1st round, 21st overall pick

Career history
- Cleveland Browns (2009–2015); Atlanta Falcons (2016–2020); San Francisco 49ers (2021)

Awards and highlights
- 3× Second-team All-Pro (2013, 2016, 2017); 7× Pro Bowl (2010, 2013, 2015–2018, 2021); NFL 2010s All-Decade Team; PFWA All-Rookie Team (2009); 2× Morris Trophy (2007, 2008); Draddy Trophy (2008); First-team All-American (2007); Second-team All-American (2008); 3× First-team All-Pac-10 (2006–2008)

Career NFL statistics
- Games played: 196
- Games started: 196
- Fumble recoveries: 4
- Stats at Pro Football Reference
- College Football Hall of Fame

Javon Alexander Mack (born November 19, 1985) is an American former professional football player who was a center in the National Football League (NFL). He played college football for the California Golden Bears and was selected by the Cleveland Browns in the first round with the 21st overall selection of the 2009 NFL draft. He also played for the Atlanta Falcons and the San Francisco 49ers. He was inducted into the College Football Hall of Fame in 2025.

== Early life ==
Mack was born in Los Angeles, California. He attended San Marcos High School in Santa Barbara, where he was named the Channel League's Co-Most Valuable Player on defense and earned a first-team all-league selection. He was also selected to the All-CIF team. In addition to football, Mack wrestled for four years with the Royals, losing only two matches his senior year and reaching the state final. He was a CIF champion as a junior and a senior. In the classroom, he compiled a 4.2 GPA and an 1180 SAT score.

Considered a two-star recruit by Rivals.com, Mack chose California over Northwestern and Stanford.

== College career ==
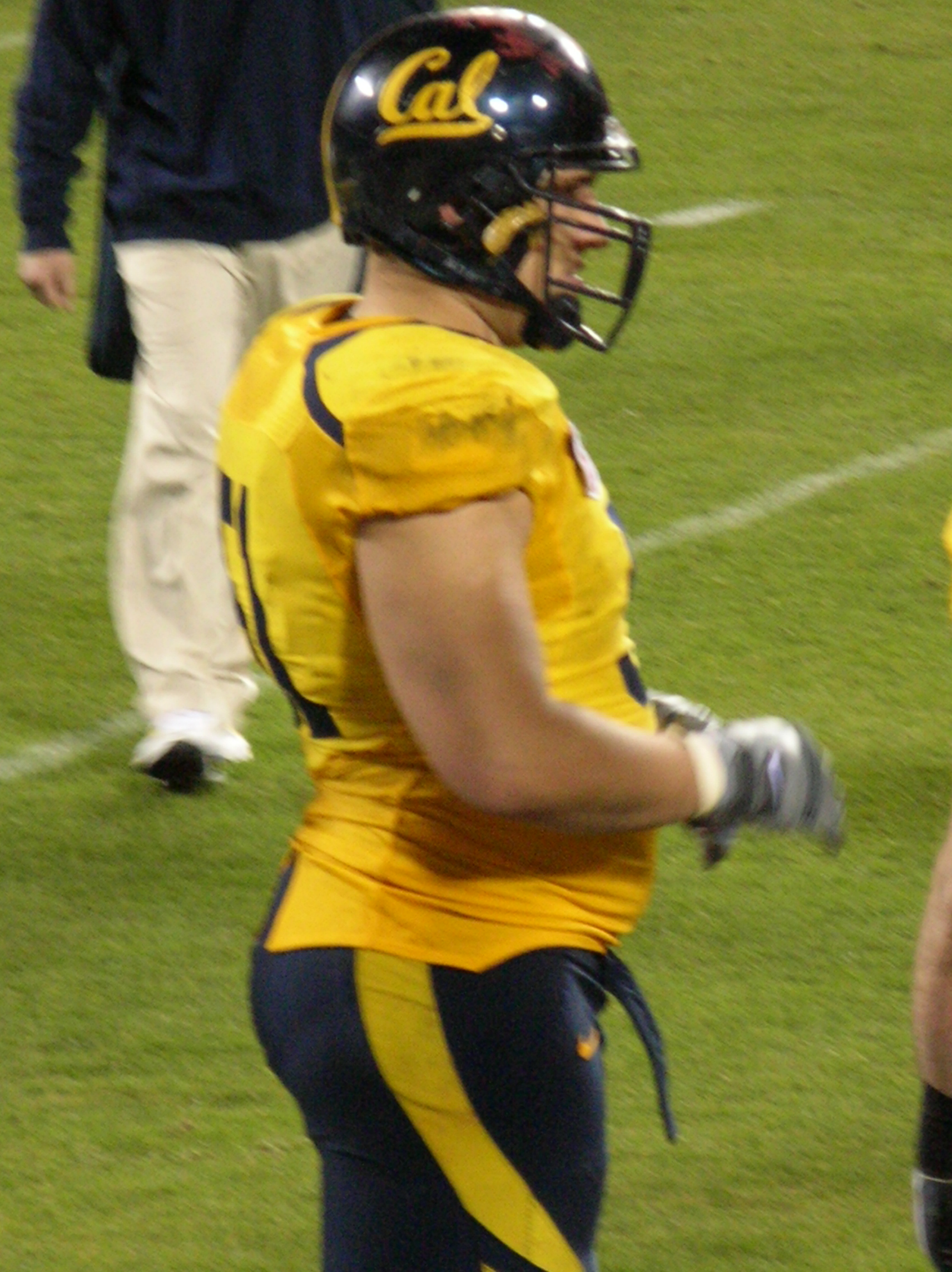
Mack at the 2008 Emerald Bowl

Mack played for the California Golden Bears football team while attending the University of California, Berkeley. He made 39 consecutive starts for the Golden Bears registering 256 key blocks/knockdowns, 32 touchdown-resulting blocks and 29 down field blocks. Mack compiled a 3.61 undergraduate GPA at the University of California, Berkeley as a legal studies major. He graduated in 2008 and played the 2008 season as a graduate student in education. He won the Draddy Trophy, also dubbed the "academic Heisman", for his academic success in 2008, becoming the first Cal player and the second consecutive center to earn the trophy, following Dallas Griffin of Texas. He also won the Morris Trophy in 2007 and 2008, making him the third offensive lineman and the first since Washington's Lincoln Kennedy in 1991 and 1992 to win the award twice. Mack also represented Cal at the 2009 Senior Bowl.

== Professional career ==
=== Pre-draft ===
Pre-draft measurables
Height	Weight	Arm length	Hand span	40-yard dash	10-yard split	20-yard split	20-yard shuttle	Three-cone drill	Vertical jump	Broad jump	Bench press
6 ft 3 7/8 in (1.93 m)	311 lb (141 kg)	33 in (0.84 m)	10 3/4 in (0.27 m)	5.17 s	1.75 s	2.96 s	4.75 s	7.31 s	28.5 in (0.72 m)	8 ft 10 in (2.69 m)	20 reps
All values from NFL Combine/Pro Day

Projected as a first-to-second rounder by Sports Illustrated, Mack was the highest ranked center available in the 2009 NFL draft.

=== Cleveland Browns ===
Mack was drafted in the first round by the Cleveland Browns with the 21st overall selection. He was the first Golden Bears offensive lineman selected in the first round since Tarik Glenn in 1997.

Mack signed a five-year contract with the Browns on July 25. During the 2009 NFL season, Mack started on the Browns offensive line every game. After a shaky start, the Browns line, anchored by Joe Thomas, paved the way to three consecutive 100+ yard games by Jerome Harrison and one game in which Harrison ran for 286 yards, which stands at third all-time in one game. At the end of the regular season, Mack was selected as center on the All-Rookie team. He started all 16 games, committed only 1 penalty and allowed just 1 sack.

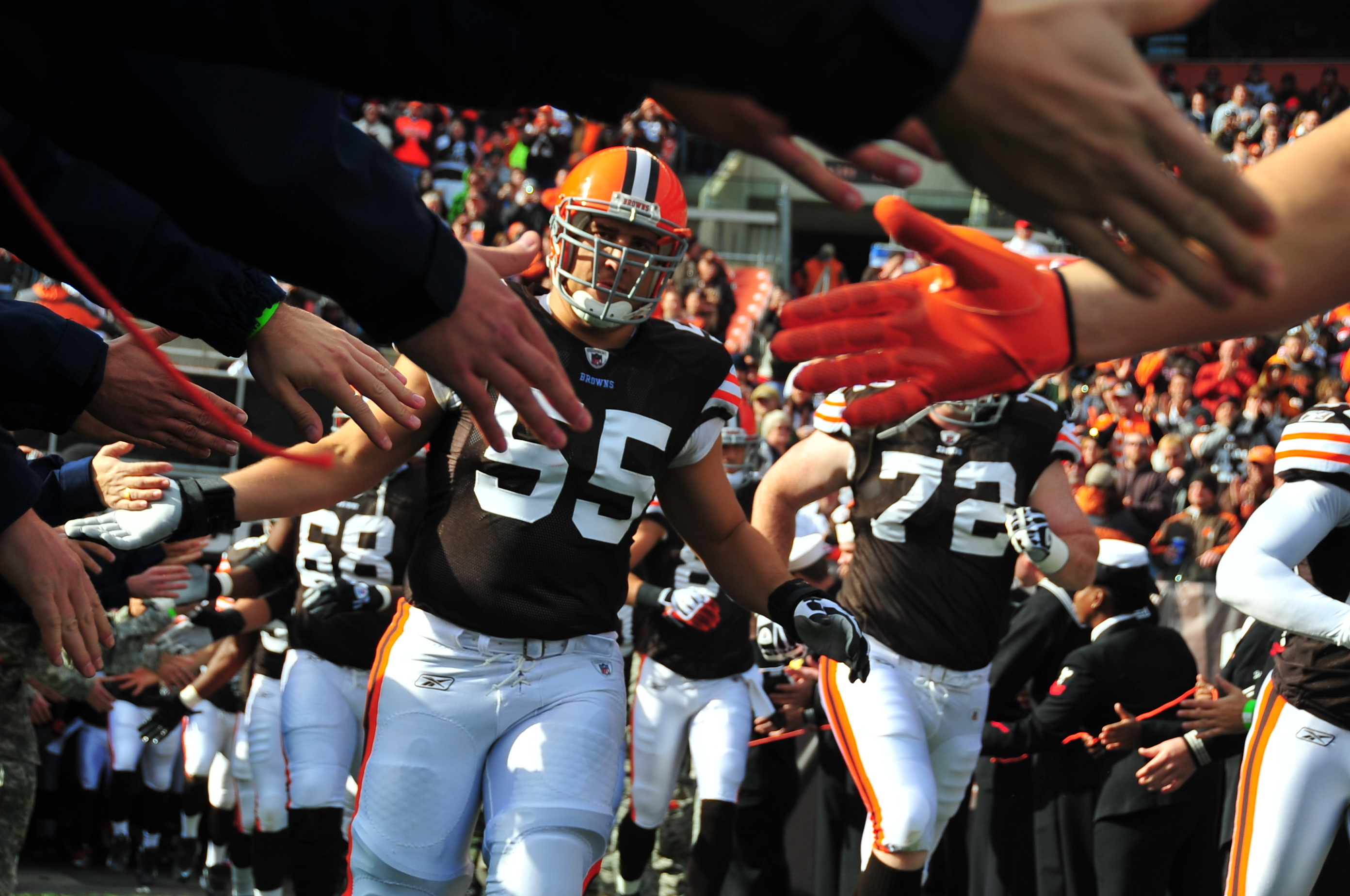
Mack with the Browns in 2010

During the 2010 NFL season, Mack again started every game for the Browns. He was named to the 2011 Pro Bowl roster as a second alternate to replace Nick Mangold. During week 5 of the 2011 NFL season, Mack played through appendicitis during a loss to the Tennessee Titans. Mack had an appendectomy during Cleveland's bye week and came back and started against the Oakland Raiders the week after the bye week.

On December 27, 2013, Alex Mack was voted to his first Pro Bowl Selection, after having been added in 2011 to replace an injured player.

On April 9, 2014, it was announced that the Jacksonville Jaguars had offered Mack a five-year contract, worth reportedly $42 million. The Browns had a maximum of five days to match Jacksonville's offer, which they did on April 11. Mack had been previously assigned the transition tag, nullifying his free agency unless a team signed Mack to an offer sheet. During Week 6 against the Pittsburgh Steelers on October 12, 2014, Mack was carted off the field due to a leg injury. X-rays tested positive that his leg had a broken fibula, forcing Mack out for the rest of the 2014 campaign. Prior to Mack's injury, he had never missed a single snap in his professional career. On March 2, 2016, Mack voided his contract with the Cleveland Browns thus making him a free agent.

=== Atlanta Falcons ===
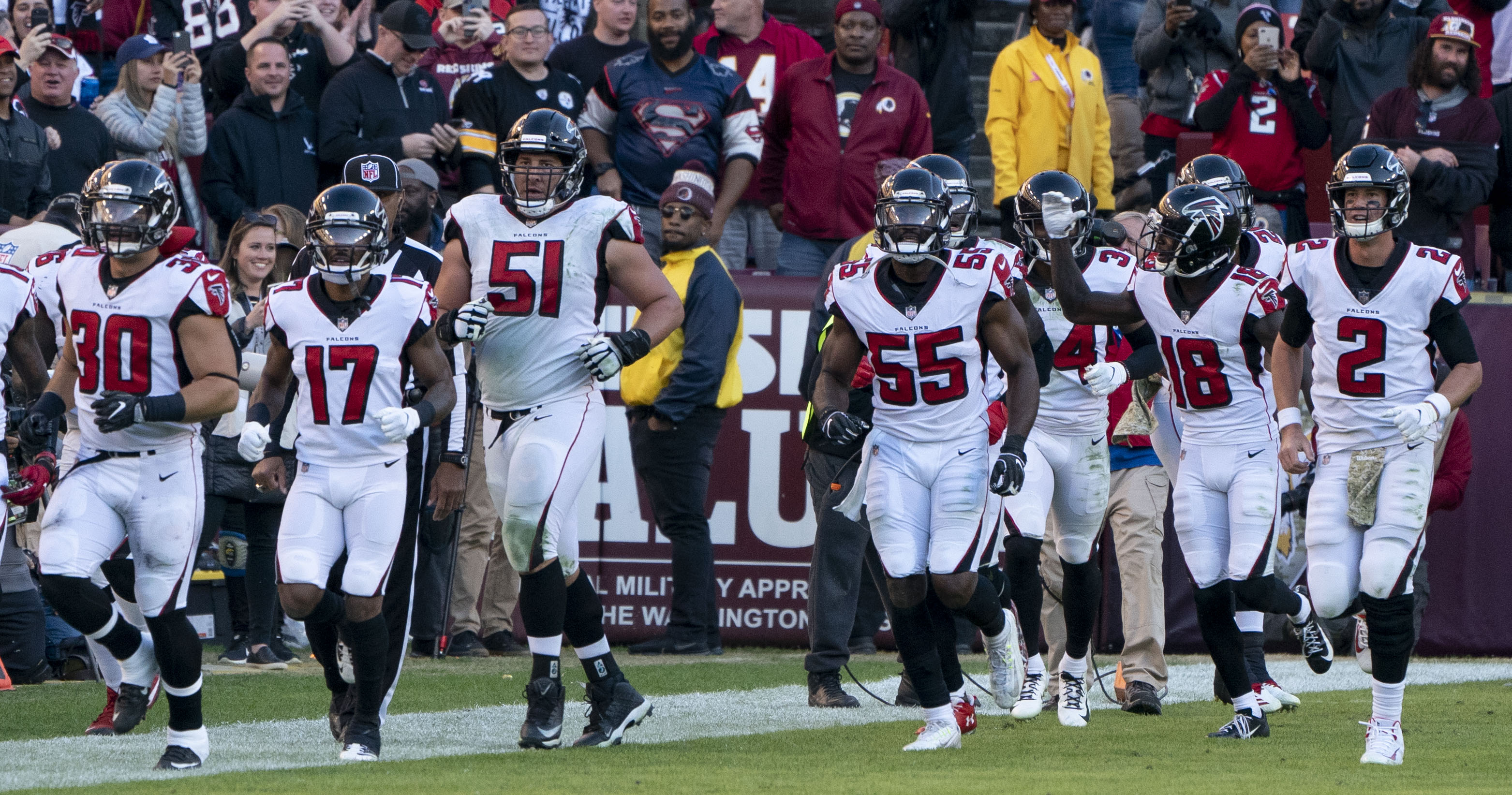
Mack and his teammates in a game against the Washington Redskins

On March 9, 2016, Mack signed a five-year, $45 million contract with the Atlanta Falcons, including $28.5 million in guaranteed money.

In the 2016 season, Mack and the Falcons reached Super Bowl LI, where they faced the New England Patriots. Mack was the starting center in the game for the Falcons. In the Super Bowl, the Falcons fell in a 34–28 overtime defeat.

On December 19, 2017, Mack was named to his fifth Pro Bowl. On December 18, 2018, Mack was named to his sixth Pro Bowl.

Mack missed Week 16 of the 2020 NFL season due to a concussion, ending a streak of 90 consecutive regular season starts. He was placed on the reserve/COVID-19 list by the team on December 31, 2020, and activated on January 13, 2021.

=== San Francisco 49ers ===
On March 18, 2021, Mack signed a three-year contract with the San Francisco 49ers.

On June 3, 2022, Mack retired after 13 seasons in the NFL.
