= Goleta Slough =

Wetland in Santa Barbara County, California

Coordinates: 34°25′25.76″N 119°50′50.86″W

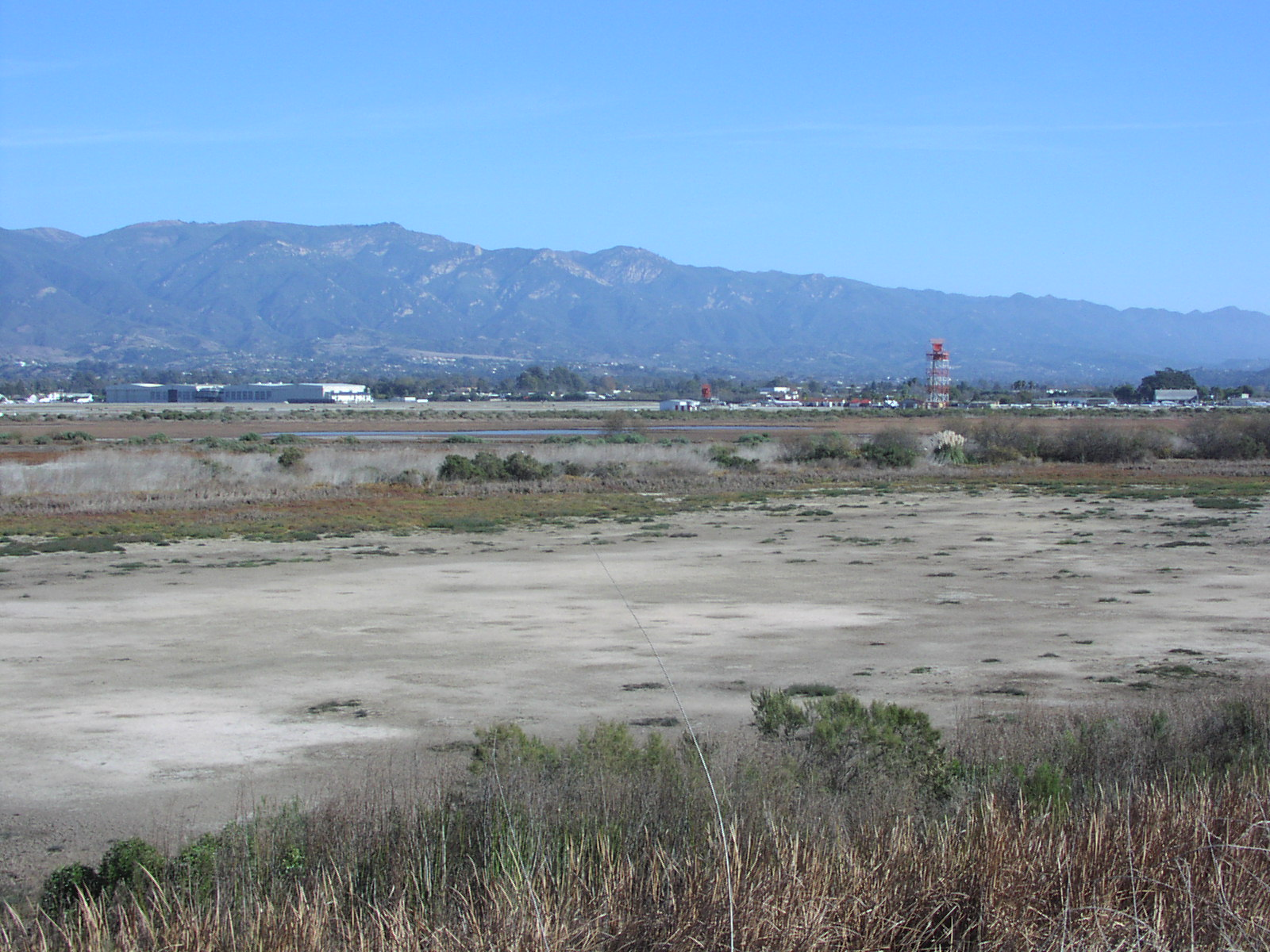
The Goleta Slough, looking northeast from UCSB, showing Santa Barbara Airport and the Santa Ynez Mountains in the distance.

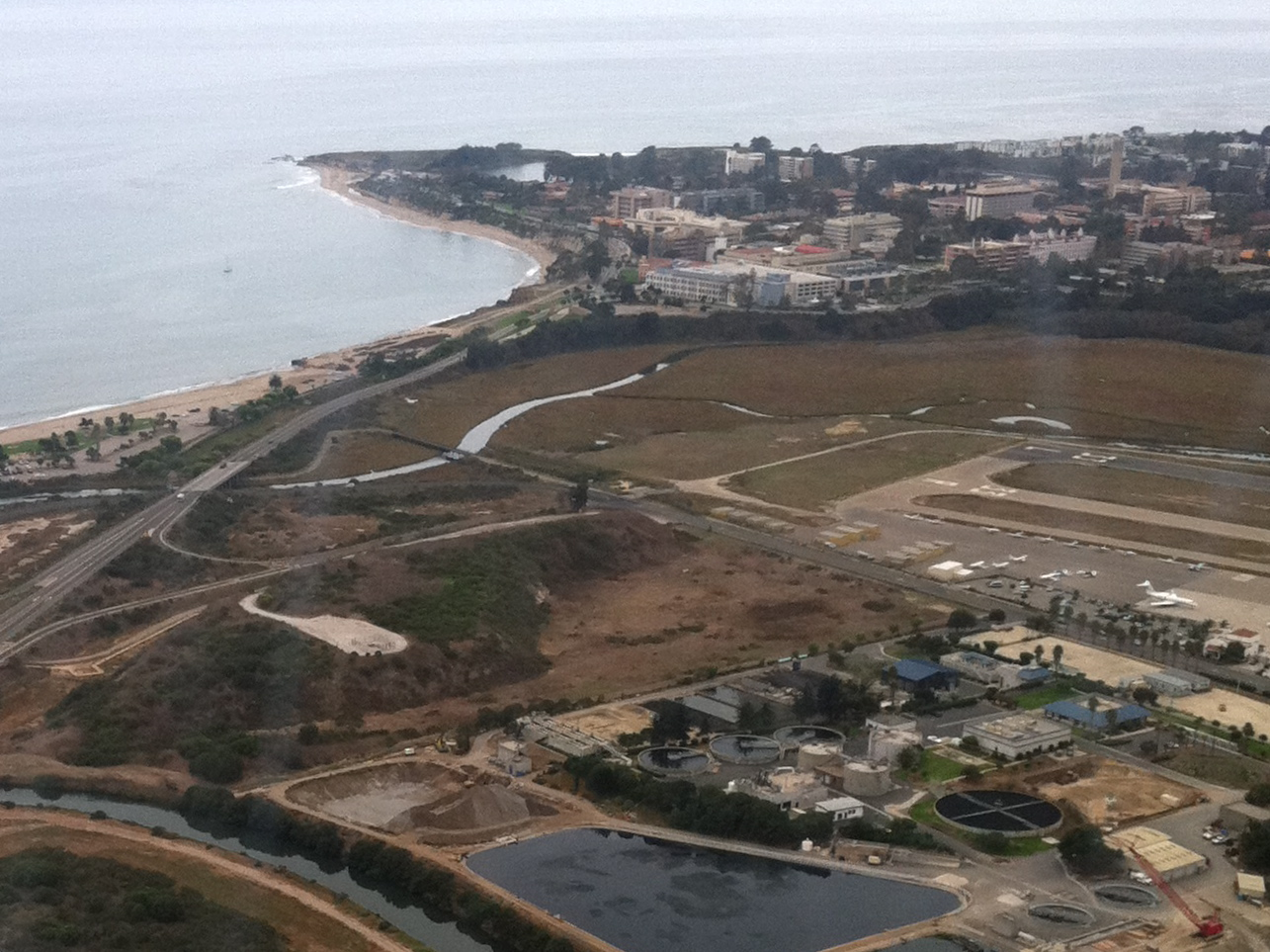
Aerial view of the remaining part of Mescalitan Island (left) and the Goleta Sanitary Sewage Treatment Plant, with UCSB in the distance.

The Goleta Slough is an area of estuary, tidal creeks, tidal marsh, and wetlands near Goleta, California, United States. It primarily consists of the filled and unfilled remnants of the historic inner Goleta Bay about 8 miles (13 km) west of Santa Barbara. The slough empties into the Pacific Ocean through an intermittently closed mouth at Goleta Beach County Park just east of the UCSB campus and Isla Vista. The slough drains the Goleta Valley and watershed, and receives the water of all of the major creeks in the Goleta area including the southern face of the Santa Ynez Mountains.

The Santa Barbara Airport has the largest border on the slough and contains the largest part of the slough. UCSB, Isla Vista, the City of Goleta and various unincorporated areas of the county, including the landward bluffs of More Mesa, surround and encompass the rest of the slough.

The Goleta Slough was impacted by two events of the late 19th century and first half of the 20th century. The first was the heavy grazing by cattle on the surrounding foothills and mountainsides followed by wide-ranging grassfires, heavy rains in 1861/62, and flooding which caused so much erosion and deposition of sediment in the mouths of the creeks emptying into Goleta Bay that most of the bay became silt-filled salt marsh in just a couple of years. The second event was the conversion of the marsh and remaining bay into a military airbase during World War II. The fill material was obtained by reducing the rest of Mescalitan Island which provided the material to fill the airport and the surrounding area. The former location of Mescalitan Island now contains a sewage treatment plant.

While no longer having a regularly navigable mouth, nor depths in most places suitable for anything except canoes, kayaks, and very small boats, the slough remains a very important area of vital wetlands, salt marsh, and estuarian creeks.

"The Goleta Slough wetlands ... are fragmented along the coast from More Mesa to UCSB Storke Campus". The Goleta Slough Ecological Reserve is administered by the Calif. Dept. of Fish and Game. The Slough contains approximately 430 acres (1.7 km^{2}) of wetland habitat (including the 360 acres (1.5 km^{2}) ecological reserve and 14.8 acres (60,000 m^{2}) at Storke Campus). The approximate historic area was 1,150 acres (4.7 km^{2}).

"The primary function of the Ecological Reserve is to provide habitat for wildlife and a setting for educational and research activities. Public utility and transportation corridors traverse the wetlands while airport runways, a sewage treatment plant, a power generation station, and light industrial facilities are constructed on filled portions of the marsh."

== Historic use ==
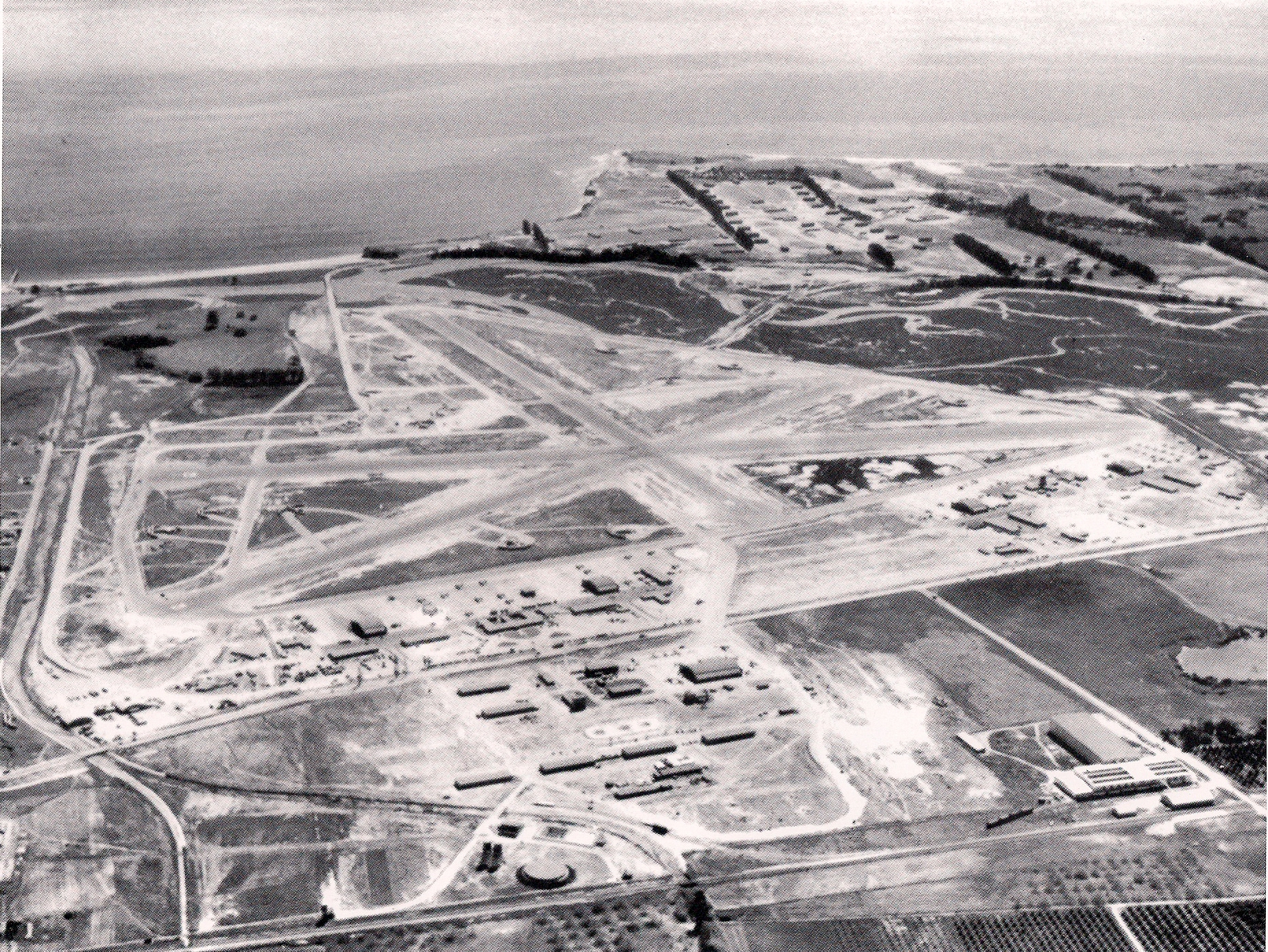
Marine Corps Air Station Santa Barbara in 1944.

"It is estimated that Native American peoples began inhabiting the area some 9,000 years ago. Early European explorers used the embayment as an anchorage for large ships until the 1860s. The severe winter storms of 1861/62 filled the embayment with sediment. Agricultural development in the slough began in the 1870s and the following decades saw the construction of berms, levees and roads to further facilitate agricultural development. In 1928 a landing strip was established in the northeastern portion of the slough, which was expanded in 1942-43 for construction of the Marine Corps Air Station Santa Barbara. It became inactive in 1946 and the Santa Barbara Airport was established.

== Adjacent use ==
Goleta Slough is almost entirely surrounded by urban development, some of which extends into the wetlands. This includes the municipal airport to the north, the sewage treatment plant and the Southern California Gas Company's La Goleta Gas Field to the east, a public beach between the ocean and the slough, the campus of UC Santa Barbara to the south and west, and residential and light industrial operations to the north and west.

== Adjacent historic use ==
Cattle ranching began in 1846 followed by agricultural development on the uplands around the slough. A whaling station was established in about 1870, asphaltum mining commenced in the 1890s, development of small farms expanded to cover the entire mesa in the 1920s, and rapid urbanization began in the 1940s.

== Tidal influence ==
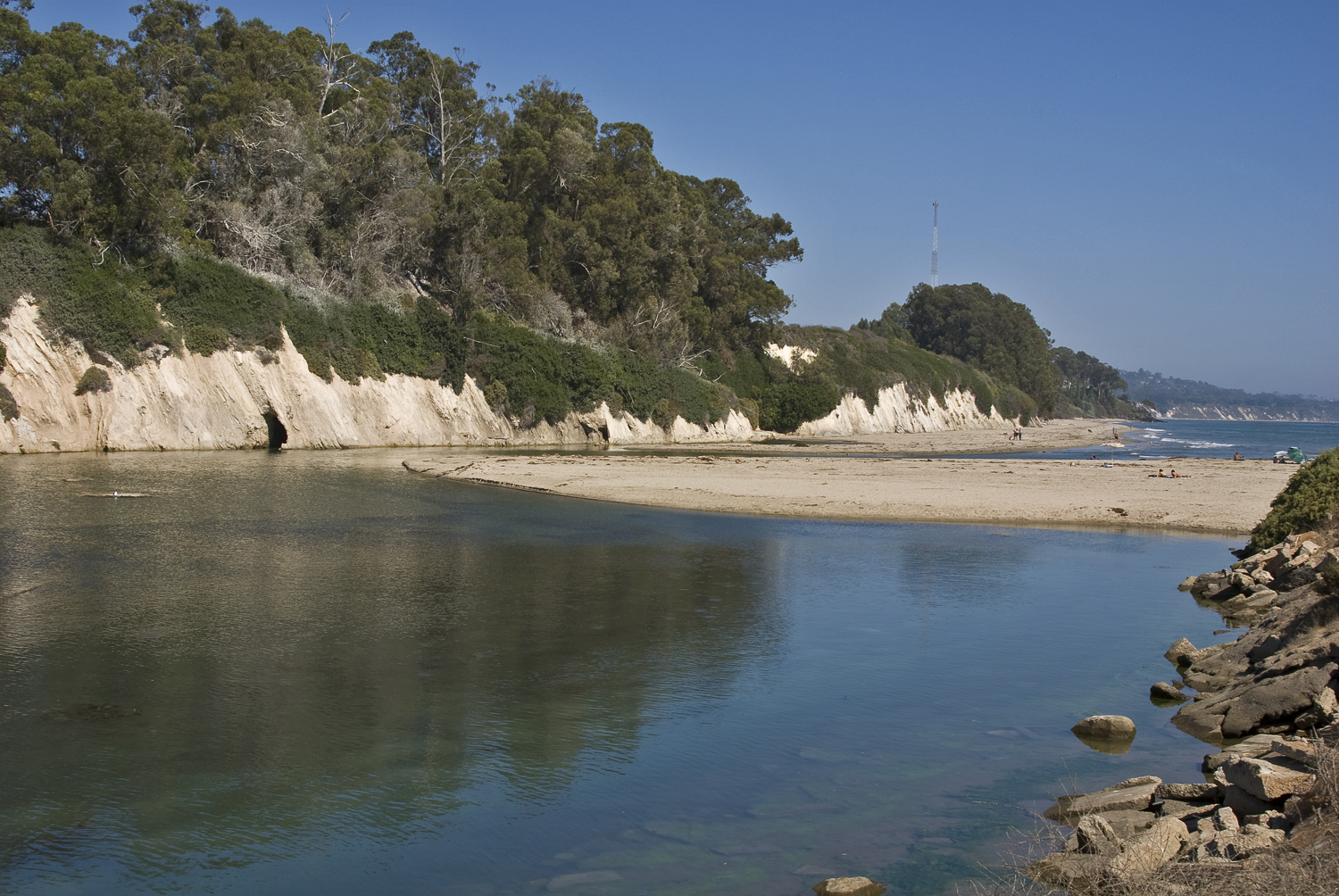
View from the slough to the ocean.

Extensive areas of the historic marsh below the high tide line are isolated from tidal influence by berms and dikes. Tidal flooding is limited to the south-central portion of the slough, extending into several of the major tributaries. Tidal amplitude in the upper reaches of the slough is diminished. During the summer months the tidal amplitude may become attenuated and eventually eliminated by progressive berming of the mouth. The beach berm is mechanically breached to maintain water quality in the slough.

The Slough is fed by a watershed area of 45 square miles (120 km^{2}).

== Tributaries and flow ==
The major tributaries of the Slough are Tecolotito Creek, Carneros Creek, and Atascadero Creek. Tecolotito Creek's highest flows are during winter storms; during the summer flows are intermittent. Carneros Creek's major flows are of the flash flood type, with intermittent flows in the summer months. Atascadero Creek is a stream that generally has perennial freshwater flow that is augmented by seepage and landscape watering. Highest flows are during winter storms. Other flow sources are runoff from the north-facing bluffs of UC Santa Barbara campus and More Mesa.

== Habitat ==
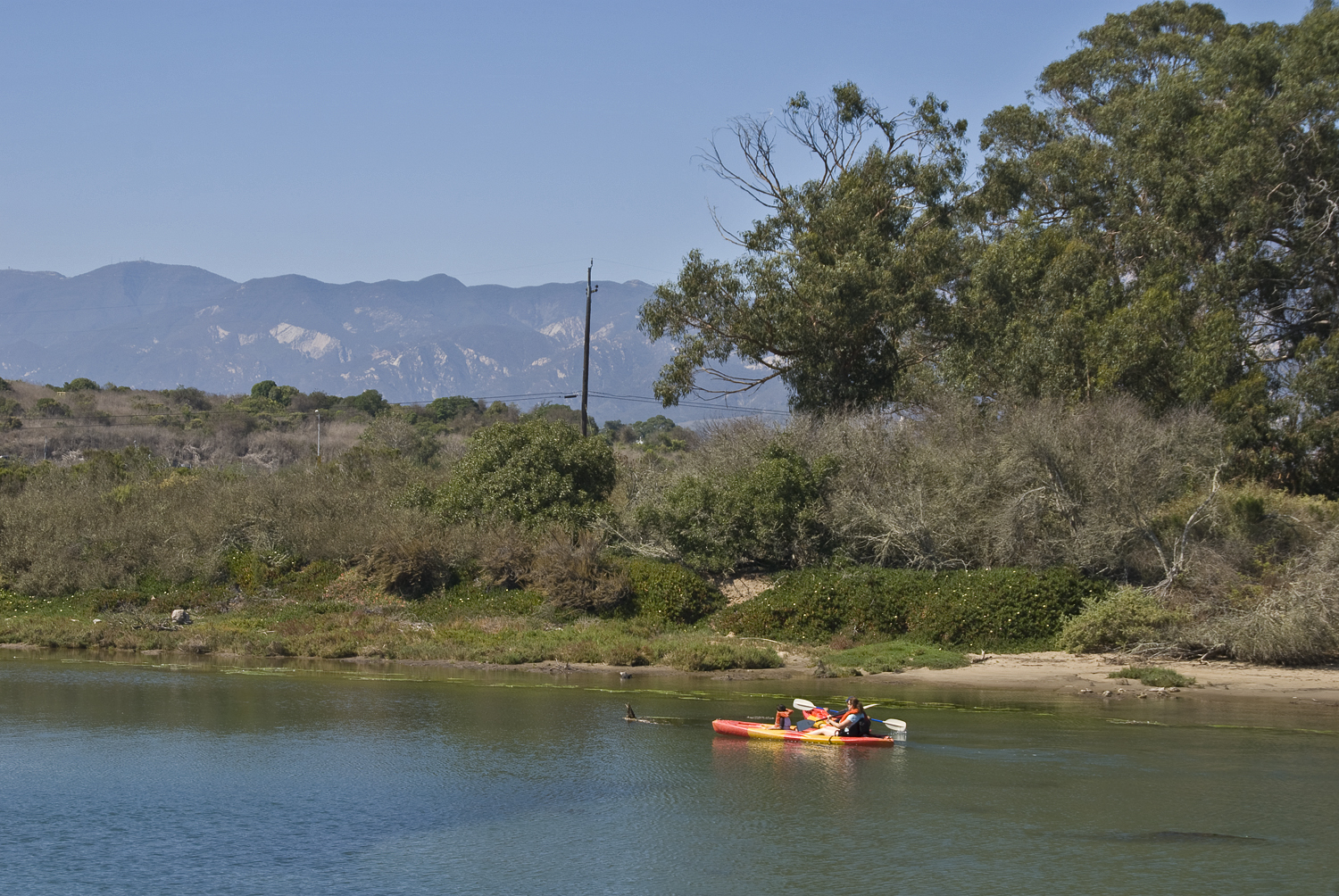
Kayaking in the slough.

Habitat area has been surveyed for the City of Santa Barbara property, the largest portion of the wetlands. It is:

- 101 acres (410,000 m^{2}) of coastal salt marsh
- 15 acres (61,000 m^{2}) of mudflats
- 4 acres (16,000 m^{2}) of saltflats
- 28 acres (110,000 m^{2}) of creek and channels
- 8+ acres (32,000 m^{2}) of riverine (riparian)
- 198 acres (800,000 m^{2}) of Palustrine (vernal wetlands)
- 4.5 acres (18,000 m^{2}) of scrub/shrub and forested wetlands.

=== Vegetation ===
Vegetation includes pickleweed, alkali-heath, salt grass, Jaumea, salt bush, ditch-grass, pondweed, tule, and cattails. The shrubs include willows and coyote brush. The trees are primarily southern coastal oak.

=== Animals ===
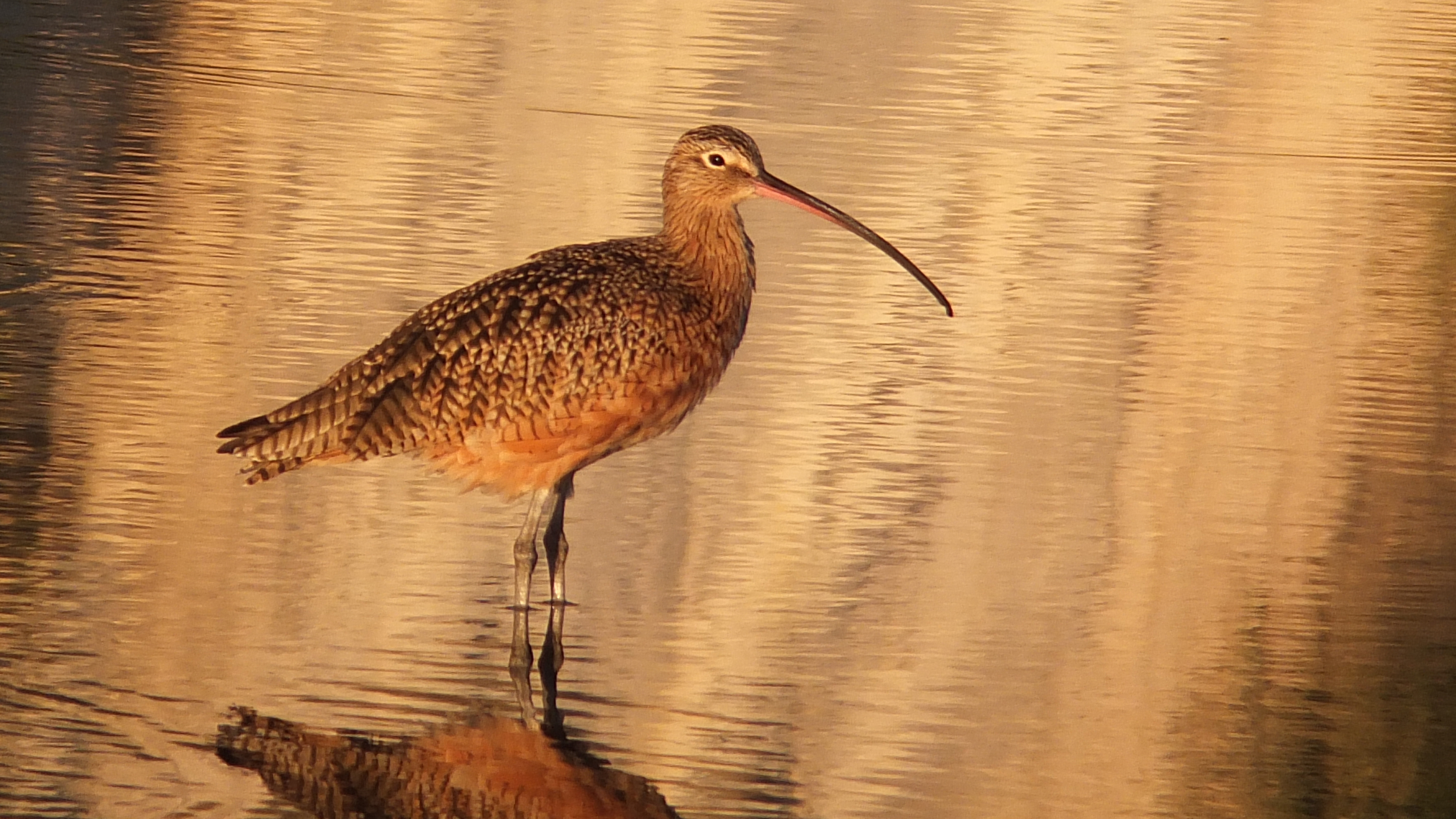
Long-billed curlew in the Goleta Slough.

Animals using the wetlands include birds, fish, benthic invertebrates, insects, and other wildlife.

279 species of birds have been observed at Goleta Slough; of these 121 were water-associated, including 20 species of special status.

10 species of fish were identified in a 1993 sampling, dominated by Killifish, Topsmelt, Arrow goby (Clevelandia ios), and Western mosquitofish (Gambusia affinis)*. A gravid Steelhead trout (Oncorhynchus mykiss) was collected in Tecolotito creek in 1995.

Benthic invertebrates species composition is characterized by low diversity and densities. Three species of polychaetes and bivalves are identified. The epifaunal invertebrates that are abundant included the lined shore crab, yellow shore crab, and California horn snail.

November 1993 insect surveys conducted with a fine mesh seine or aquarium dip nets at the mouth and the back portion of the slough yielded 11 species; major taxonomic groups were bugs, damselflies, mayflies, beetles, caddisflies, butterflies and flies.

1986/87 trapping and visual surveys at the Storke Campus Wetlands identified two species of mice, one vole, one amphibian, and two species of reptiles. 1996 report identified the Western pond turtle (Actinemys marmorata) in Atascadero Creek from surveys in 1982 and 1994. The 1996 report also identified three special status species from a 1983 survey of the Ecological Reserve: Pallid bat (Antrozous pallidus), American badger (Taxidea taxus), and San Diego black-tailed jackrabbit (L. californicus bennettii). Ten species of mammals were identified in 1970 survey of the main portion of the slough.

A 1996 report identified 20 special status species from various surveys (dates not specified): California brown pelican, southern bald eagle, peregrine falcon, snowy plover, common loon, American white pelican, double-crested cormorant, white-faced ibis, fulvous whistling duck, harlequin duck, northern harrier, golden eagle, osprey, long-billed curlew, California gull, elegant tern, and black skimmer. Those with specified dates included Belding's Savannah sparrow (1994), and California horned lark (1995).

The 1996 report identified the following mammals from a 1983 survey; pallid bat, American badger, and the San Diego black-tailed jackrabbit.

== See also ==
- Goleta Beach
- Chumash (tribe)
