= Eastern Goleta Valley, California =

Eastern Goleta Valley
- Unincorporated community Census-designated place
- Location within California Location within the United States
- Coordinates: 34°26′40″N 119°47′21″W
- Country: United States
- State: California
- County: Santa Barbara

Area
  - Total: 16.89 sq mi (43.74 km^{2})
  - Land: 16.59 sq mi (42.98 km^{2})
  - Water: 0.29 sq mi (0.76 km^{2})
- Elevation: 120 ft (37 m)

Population (2020)
  - Total: 28,656
  - Density: 1,726.8/sq mi (666.71/km^{2})
- Time zone: UTC-8 (Pacific (PST))
  - Summer (DST): UTC-7 (PDT)
- ZIP Codes: 93105, 93110, 93111, 93117 (Santa Barbara)
- Area code: 805
- FIPS code: 06-20574
- GNIS feature ID: 2813349

Eastern Goleta Valley is an unincorporated community and census-designated place (CDP) in Santa Barbara County, California, United States. As of the 2020 census, Eastern Goleta Valley had a population of 28,656. It is located between Goleta to the west, Santa Barbara to the east, the Pacific Ocean to the south, and the Santa Ynez Mountains to the north and includes the communities of Noleta and Hope Ranch. For statistical purposes, the United States Census Bureau designated the area as a census-designated place (CDP) prior to the 2020 census. Prior to the incorporation of Goleta in 2002 within a narrower set of boundaries, the area was included in the Goleta CDP.

== Demographics ==
Historical population
Census	Pop.	Note	%±
2020	28,656		—
U.S. Decennial Census; 1860–1870 1880-1890; 1900 1910 1920; 1930 1940 1950; 1960 1970 1980; 1990 2000 2010; 2020

Eastern Goleta Valley first appeared as a census designated place in the 2020 U.S. census.

=== Racial and ethnic composition ===
Eastern Goleta Valley CDP, California – Racial and ethnic composition Note: the US Census treats Hispanic/Latino as an ethnic category. This table excludes Latinos from the racial categories and assigns them to a separate category. Hispanics/Latinos may be of any race.
Race / Ethnicity (NH = Non-Hispanic)	Pop 2020	% 2020
White alone (NH)	17,661	61.63%
Black or African American alone (NH)	204	0.71%
Native American or Alaska Native alone (NH)	82	0.29%
Asian alone (NH)	1,714	5.98%
Pacific Islander alone (NH)	52	0.18%
Other race alone (NH)	173	0.60%
Mixed race or Multiracial (NH)	1,312	4.58%
Hispanic or Latino (any race)	7,458	26.03%
Total	28,656	100.00%

=== 2020 census ===
As of the 2020 census, Eastern Goleta Valley had a population of 28,656. The median age was 48.0 years. 18.2% of residents were under the age of 18 and 26.2% of residents were 65 years of age or older. For every 100 females there were 95.4 males, and for every 100 females age 18 and over there were 93.0 males age 18 and over.

94.3% of residents lived in urban areas, while 5.7% lived in rural areas.

There were 10,208 households in Eastern Goleta Valley, of which 28.3% had children under the age of 18 living in them. Of all households, 57.0% were married-couple households, 13.7% were households with a male householder and no spouse or partner present, and 24.2% were households with a female householder and no spouse or partner present. About 22.0% of all households were made up of individuals and 13.8% had someone living alone who was 65 years of age or older.

There were 10,684 housing units, of which 4.5% were vacant. The homeowner vacancy rate was 0.9% and the rental vacancy rate was 3.0%.

Racial composition as of the 2020 census
Race	Number	Percent
White	19,042	66.5%
Black or African American	236	0.8%
American Indian and Alaska Native	286	1.0%
Asian	1,749	6.1%
Native Hawaiian and Other Pacific Islander	58	0.2%
Some other race	3,019	10.5%
Two or more races	4,266	14.9%
Hispanic or Latino (of any race)	7,458	26.0%
