= Mescalitan Island =

Island in California

Coordinates: 34.42166°N 119.83347°W

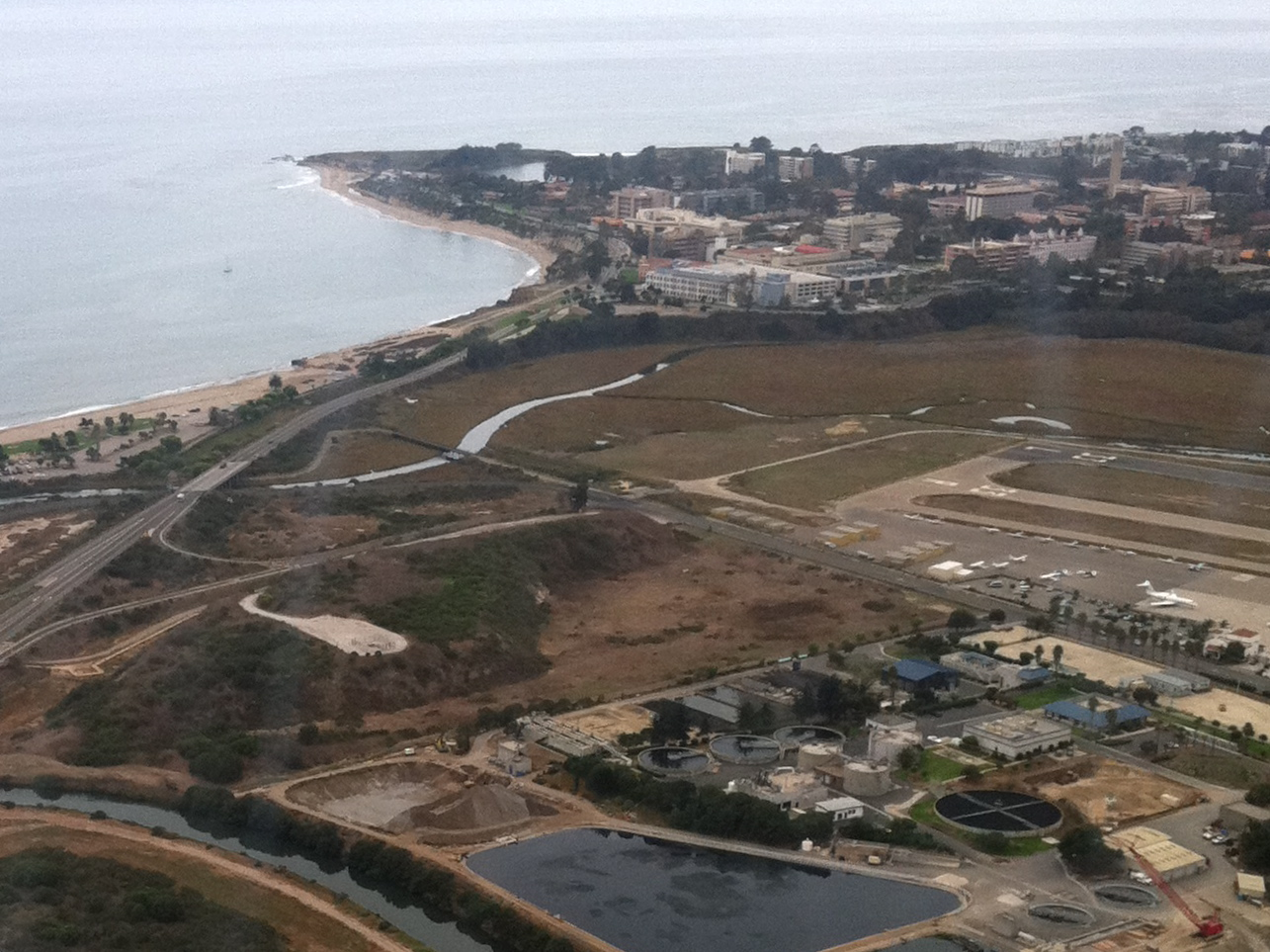
Aerial view of the remaining part of Mescalitan Island (left) and the Goleta Sanitary Sewage Treatment Plant, with UCSB in the distance.

Mescalitan Island is a mesalike island located about 10 miles (16 km) west of Santa Barbara, California, United States, near the outlet of the Goleta Slough into the Pacific Ocean.

== History ==
=== Chumash Indians ===
The island is where the Chumash Indian village Helo was centered. Early Spanish mission documents note that Juan Crespi, an early visitor, observed the island village to have at least 100 houses with about 600 to 800 total residents.

=== Juan Cabrillo Period ===
The first European explorer in the Goleta area, Portuguese navigator Juan Rodriguez Cabrillo, arrived on October 15, 1542. At this time the Goleta Slough was deep and wide enough to permit entry of large ships. A Spanish schooner, or 'goleta', reportedly sank in the lagoon area sometime thereafter. From that point on, the area became known as Goleta. During a sailing trip to Northern California, Cabrillo was injured, later dying of his injuries; according to some accounts he was buried on San Miguel Island. However, according to the local canaliños (Chumash) he was buried on Mescalitan Island.

Mescalitan Island was a prominent landmark in the Goleta Slough area. In the 1860s, after years of flooding and winter storms the slough became filled in with sediment.

=== Leveled ===
In 1941 the Army Corps of Engineers leveled most of Mescalitan Island to provide fill for a Navy airport. That airport became part of Marine Corps Air Station Santa Barbara in 1942, and a few years later became the Santa Barbara Municipal Airport.

=== Present day ===
The island is currently the location of the Goleta Sanitary Water Resource Recovery District.

There is a mural depicting Mescalitan Island on the side of the Santa Cruz Market on Hollister Avenue in old town Goleta.

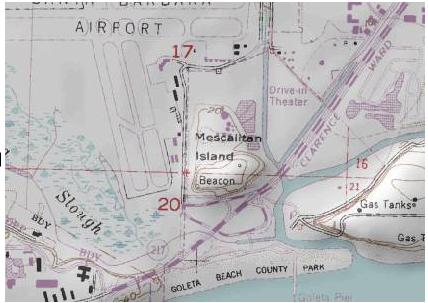
Topographic Image of the Island

== Location ==
The site of Mescalitan Island is in southern Santa Barbara County, California at 34° 25' 16" N. latitude and 119° 50' W. longitude. Mescalitan Island is shown in the center of the Goleta USGS topographic quadrangle.

== See also ==
- Chumash populated places
