= Hope Ranch, California =

Suburb of Santa Barbara, California, United States

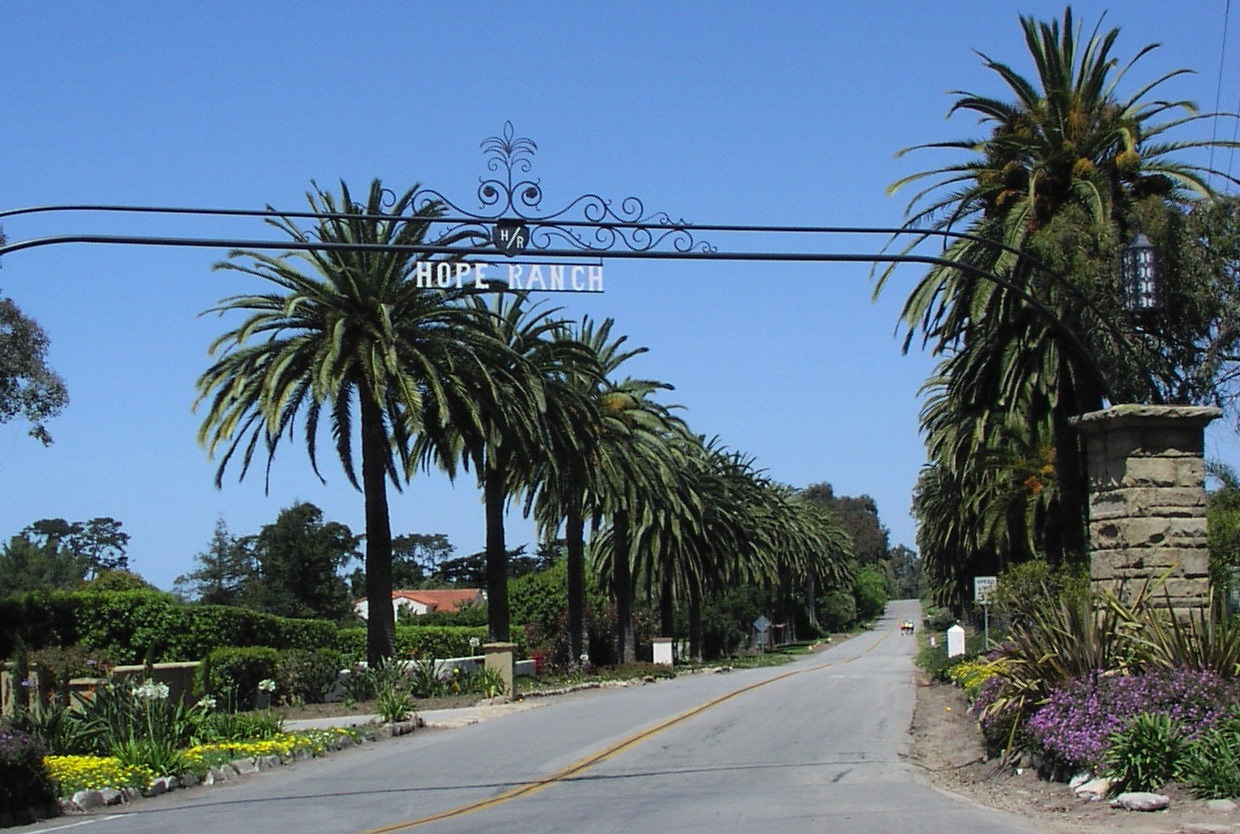
The eastern entrance to Hope Ranch, showing the main thoroughfare through the unincorporated community

Hope Ranch is an unincorporated coastal suburb of Santa Barbara, California, United States, located in Santa Barbara County. It is bounded on the east by Santa Barbara, on the north and west by the unincorporated area of the eastern Goleta Valley, and on the south by the Pacific Ocean. As of the 2000 census, the area had an approximate population of 2,200. For the 2020 census, Hope Ranch was included in the Eastern Goleta Valley census-designated place. The ZIP codes are 93105 and 93110, and the community is served by area code 805.

Hope Ranch is a neighborhood with a strong equestrian community. It is home to 27 miles (43 km) of riding trails and 10 percent of residents are horse-owners.

== History ==
Hope Ranch is named after Irishman Thomas Hope. Hope moved to Santa Barbara in 1849. Hope acquired the land that became Hope Ranch in approximately 1861 for sheep ranching. He built a two-story home on the property in 1875. Hope's house was used until 1962 as the headquarters of Hope Ranch Park.

In 1877, Thomas Hope's widow sold 2,000 acres comprising the western portion of the ranch for $250,000 to the Pacific Improvement Company, a holding company formed by the four principals of the Southern Pacific Railroad: Charles Crocker, Collis Potter Huntington, Leland Stanford, and Mark Hopkins Jr. Initial plans to build an 800-room hotel on the property were not consummated, and the Pacific Improvement Company instead announced plans in 1900 to subdivide the land for the construction of villas.

In 1925, Harold S. Chase organized a syndicate known as La Cumbre Estates Corporation that purchased the 1,200 acres situated west of Las Palmas and Roble Drives and the agricultural land located south of Hollister Avenue. The La Cumbre Estates Corporation developed the land into the residential area that exists today. The first houses constructed were "Las Terrasas" built in 1925 as the home of Harold S. Chase and "Florestal" built in 1926 for Peter Cooper Bryce (son of Lloyd Bryce).

== Geography ==
Since it is not a census-designated place, the boundaries are informal, except where they coincide with incorporated regions. On the east Hope Ranch is bounded by the City of Santa Barbara, on the north by Modoc Road, Hollister Avenue, and Vieja Drive, on the west by a vacant tract of land known as More Mesa, and on the south by the Pacific Ocean.

=== Geology ===
Hope Ranch occupies a hilly area immediately adjacent to the coast; the highest elevation is 691 feet (211 m). The northern boundary of the hilly area is Cieneguitas Creek, which flows down the topographic expression of the More Ranch Fault; this ravine also helps define the informal northern boundary of the suburb. Native vegetation is mostly California oak woodland and chaparral, and many of the homes have been constructed to blend in with the oaks; the area retains much of its tree canopy. Residential roads are narrow and winding, not always signed, and interweave with an elaborate network of horse paths. A road to a private beach is open to residents only (although the beach itself is accessible from public beaches on either side).

== Public safety ==
Hope Ranch is served by the Santa Barbara County Sheriff's Office, but Hope Ranch Homeowner's Association also employs its own security.

== Education ==
Children attend schools in Hope Elementary District, which consists of three schools: Hope, Monte Vista and Vieja Valley. In state comparisons, these schools rank among the top 20 percent in California. Teenagers generally attend Santa Barbara High School District, but there is also a private high school located in Hope Ranch.

== Access ==
The local homeowner's association manages the properties of private roads, bridle trails, and the private beach. Since Hope Ranch is in unincorporated Santa Barbara County, law enforcement falls under the jurisdiction of the Santa Barbara County Sheriff's Office. The private regions additionally have a local "Hope Ranch Patrol," who have only limited law enforcing powers. This group is controlled by the board of Hope Ranch and is in no way connected to either the City of Santa Barbara Police Department or the Santa Barbara County Sheriff's Office.

The main stretch of road through Hope Ranch is Las Palmas/Marina Drive, a palm tree-lined stretch of roadway along which runs the coastal bike route. Hope Ranch is home to La Cumbre Country Club and Laguna Blanca School, an independent day school, which was founded in 1933.

In addition to being one of the most expensive neighborhoods in Santa Barbara, Hope Ranch is one of the wealthiest areas in California; the median home price was $2.61 million in 2006. Houses with ocean views generally listed then for at least $5 million, with oceanfront properties going for $25 million and more.

== Notable people ==
- Wendy McCaw – Billionaire owner of Santa Barbara News Press.
- H.R. Haldeman family – H.R. Haldeman was White House Chief of Staff under Richard Nixon. After his term, Haldeman lived in Hope Ranch until his death in 1993.
- Snoop Dogg – purchased a house in November 2006.
- Fess Parker – Actor and businessman.
- Vera Ralston – Figure skater and actress.
- Ron Ely – Actor and writer.
- Don Stewart – Actor. Lived in Hope Ranch from 1985 until his death in 2006.
- Dr. Laura Schlessinger – Radio Host.
