= Mark W. Lee =

American dramatist

- Born: Minneapolis, Minnesota, U.S.
- Education: Yale University
- Occupations: Novelist; writer; poet; playwright
- Website: www.markwlee.com

Mark W. Lee is an American novelist, children's book writer, poet and playwright. He has worked as a war correspondent and some of these real-life experiences have appeared in his fiction.

== Early life ==
Lee was born in Minneapolis, Minnesota. He attended Yale University where he became friends with the Pulitzer prize winning poet and novelist Robert Penn Warren. Lee dedicated his first novel to Warren.

After graduating from Yale in 1973, Lee lived in New York City for several years where he worked as a taxi driver, a language teacher and a security guard. In New York, he became friends with artists Frank Moore and Lillian Mulero. His poetry and nonfiction appeared in The Atlantic Monthly, The Times Literary Supplement and a variety of literary journals.

Lee has always done elaborate research for his literary work. When writing a long poem about Henry Hudson, he walked alone down the eastern shore of Hudson Bay. His poem, Hudson Bay, 1611, was published in The Sewanee Review.

== Journalism ==
In the early 1980s, Lee traveled to East Africa where he worked as a foreign correspondent for Reuters and The Daily Telegraph. During the civil war that followed the fall of dictator Idi Amin, he was one of the few western journalists living in Uganda. Reporting on the poaching of elephants on the northern Ugandan border, Lee was almost killed by Sudanese soldiers.

After being expelled from Uganda for writing about military atrocities, Lee returned to the United States. He found that he could no longer write poetry and began writing plays and novels.

In 2000, Lee traveled to East Timor and wrote articles about the civil war for the Atlantic Monthly and the Los Angeles Times.

== Plays ==
His first play, California Dog Fight, was set at an illegal dog fight the Sacramento delta. It premiered at the Manhattan Theatre Club (1985) and went on to an award-winning production at the Bush Theatre in London.

Lee's next play, Rebel Armies Deep Into Chad, premiered at New Haven's Long Wharf Theatre in 1989. Rebel Armies is about the confrontation between two white journalists and two African prostitutes. It has been performed at many theatres throughout America.

Lee's play, Pirates (1992) premiered at South Coast Repertory in Costa Mesa where it won the American Express California Playwrights competition.

An American Romance (1997) premiered at the Road Theatre in Los Angeles. It won 12 regional theatre awards.

Lee's play, Century City (1998), premiered at the WPA Theatre in New York.

The Private Room, Lee's controversial play set in the prison cells of Guantanamo Bay, premiered at the New End Theatre in London in 2004.

== Books ==
Mark Lee's first novel, The Lost Tribe, was published in 1998 by Picador USA. The book describes an epic journey of Africans and Americans looking for the contemporary descendants of the Lost Tribes of Israel. In a review of The Lost Tribe published in the Washington Post Book World, the critic wrote: "Without overwriting, Lee can convey the sprinting pace of a brush fire, the horror of an elephant slaughter, the hair-trigger tenseness of a military checkpoint."

Lee's second novel, The Canal House, was published by Algonquin Books of Chapel Hill in 2003. The critically praised novel is set in Africa, London and East Timor. It describes the dangerous world of war correspondents and aid workers. In the Denver Post, the reviewer of The Canal House wrote:"A story presented in prose so fine it nearly sings, peopled with characters who burn themselves into your mind and heart."

His work appears in Politically Inspired a collection of essays and short stories about the Iraq war published by MacAdam/Cage. In Publishers Weekly, the reviewer wrote:Lee's Memo to Our Journalists is a short, punchy list of editorial precautions to reporters in Iraq. It includes such pithy advice as: "If you and your embedded unit are lost in the countryside and searching for the main road, remember that every adult male in the world lies about most things much of the time. Look for a smart, honest nine-year-old."

== Children's books ==
In June 2013, Candlewick Press published Mark Lee's first children's book: Twenty Big Trucks in the Middle of the Street. The book was illustrated by Kurt Cyrus. The Wall Street Journal reviewer wrote: “As mystifying as it may be to their mothers and sisters, small boys tend to be entranced by powerful vehicles. The very fact of trucks—let alone their variety and different purposes—gives a thrill to certain 3- to 6-year-olds. For these children, Mark Lee's Twenty Big Trucks in the Middle of the Street will be handsome entertainment."

Twenty Big Trucks in the Middle of the Street was picked by Amazon.com as one of the Best Children's Books of 2013 for Ages 3–5.

== Human rights work ==
Mark Lee has been deeply involved in freedom of speech and human rights activities for PEN, the international writers' organization. He gave speeches and interviews attacking the Patriot Act, traveled to Ethiopia to help imprisoned writers, started the Seattle Chapter of PEN and organized a medical insurance program for PEN writers.

In 2008, with funding from PEN Center USA, he established "Tibetan PEN in the Classroom"—a program where exiled Tibetan writers teach students how write poetry and fiction.

Lee currently lives in New York City. He has two children.
