= Veronica Springs =

Historic mineral spring, California

- Veronica Medicinal Springs
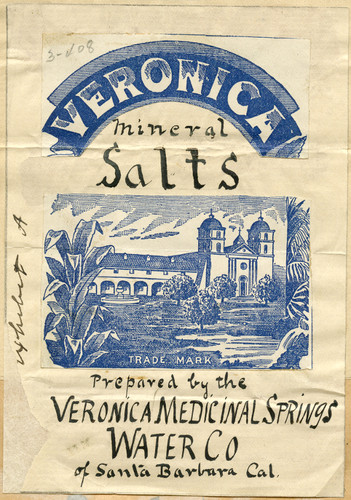
- Veronica Medicinal Salts c. 1899, illustration of the Santa Barbara Mission
- Interactive map of Veronica Springs
- Location: Arroyo Burro Open Space, Santa Barbara
- Coordinates: 34.4111°N 119.7418°W

Veronica Springs, also Veronica Medicinal Springs, was a cluster of natural springs along Arroyo Burro creek in Santa Barbara County, California, United States. Veronica spring water was not a therapeutic spa water or a table water but a medicinal mineral water with high magnesium levels. The waters had a yellowish tinge and a strongly purgative-laxative effect (similar to commercial preparations of milk of magnesia), and beginning around 1887, the water was bottled and sold as a health tonic. Veronica Water peaked as a brand in the 1910s. The springs were capped off in 1962.

== Location ==
Veronica Springs was located about 3 miles (4.8 km) west of downtown Santa Barbara "in a wooded canyon that extends from Hendry Beach to Modoc Road," in what is today a city-owned park called Arroyo Burro Open Space and was known in the early 20th century as Veronica Valley. In addition to the Veronica Medicinal Springs, other adjacent springs with similar water profiles bottled and sold their water as well. In 1901, there were Bythenia Springs and Santa Barbara Springs, the latter located on "the mesa adjacent to the same territory." The Santa Barbara Springs were also known as Pinkham's and were owned by S. C. Pinkham. Pinkham's bottled 1,500 US gallons (5,700 L; 1,200 imp gal) annually as of 1917. Bythenia was owned by J. M. McNulty, and located on the Hope Ranch. The Bythenia water was bottled in San Francisco. Circa 1917 a man named Thomas W. Moore owned an unexploited similar spring on the east side of the valley, where water flowed from "soft clay below a limestone ledge."

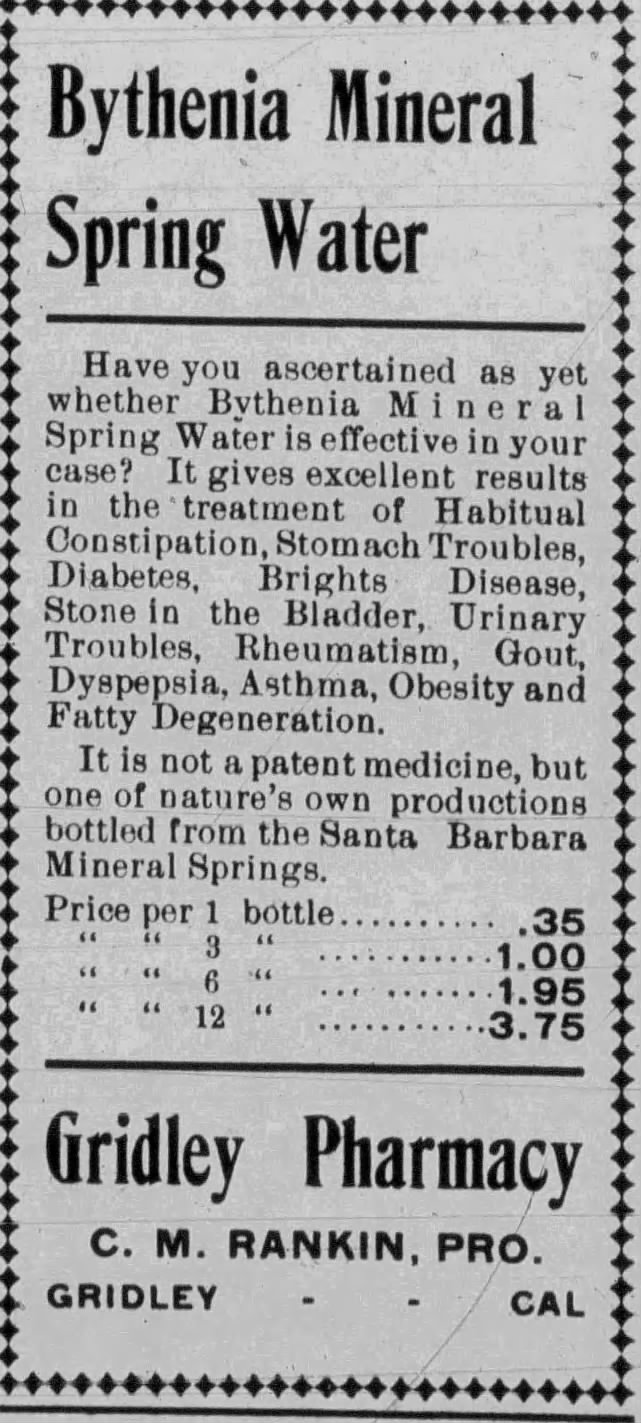
Bythenia Mineral Spring Water advertisement (The Gridley Herald, Gridley, Calif., June 9, 1905)

== History ==
=== 19th century ===
The waters were known to indigenous people, including the Chumash, who reportedly "not only drank the water but heated rocks and used it for bathing when ill." One account stated that Indians camped at Veronica Springs "twice yearly," in the spring and in the fall. Another account had it that remote communities would send messengers to the springs to collect waters to dose ailing villagers. After European colonization, the springs were named in honor of Saint Veronica by the Catholic friars of Mission Santa Barbara. Another version has it that Veronica was the baptismal name of "an Indian girl who administered the water...and thereafter the water was called 'Veronica water'.

The naturalist Thomas Nuttall is believed to have made a number of his Santa Barbara-area collections of 1836 "in sandy woodland probably about Veronica Springs." Booster and journalist Charles Nordhoff mentioned "numerous hot and cold springs" in the Santa Barbara area in his writings about California in the 1870s.

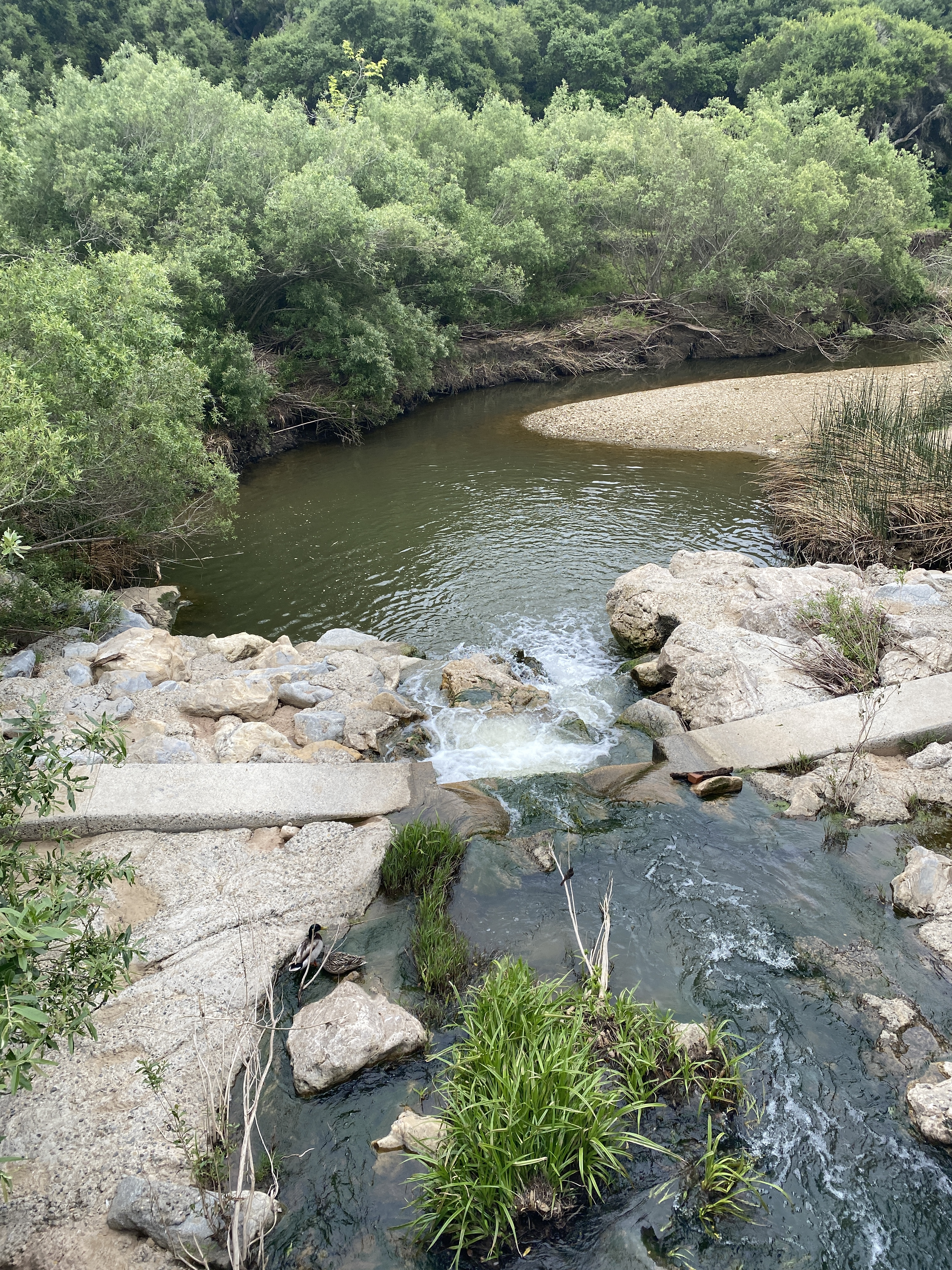
Arroyo Burro Creek (2024)

As a regional history told it in 1917, "About the year 1870 a gentleman who had married the daughter of one of the early Californians and through her, had learned the value of Veronica Springs water, sought to interest the white man in commercializing the same but without success, until about the year 1880, when a couple of prominent Santa Barbarans agreed to finance the proposition in a small way, as they had but little faith in its merits. They opened offices in San Francisco, from which began the sale of Veronica water. A young man who had enjoyed a remarkable cure as a result of the use of this water decided to spend the remainder of his life furthering the interests of Veronica water. In 1895 he went East with the first carload of it and opened offices in Philadelphia, and from this small beginning Veronica water has found its way around the entire world." Bottled Veronica water that was shown at the 1892 Santa Barbara fair by one Henry Clifton was said to have "wonderfully curative properties" and to look as "clear and limpid as a moonbeam."

More straightforward accounts credit the Hawley family with beginning the commercialization of the water. The Hawleys moved to the Santa Barbara area in 1885, and the sons initially sold farm equipment. The father, Walter N. Hawley, had real estate investments including "the upper and lower Hawley blocks," the Arlington Hotel, and a subdivision called Hawley Heights "on the Riviera". Sons Walter Augustus Hawley, Theodore S. Hawley, and Albert E. Hawley (and partners) incorporated the Veronica Springs Mineral Water Company with a $100,000 stock offering in 1893, and incorporated again in 1898 under the name Medicinal Springs Water Company with $300,000 in stock. W. A. Hawley and T. S. Hawley were manager and president of Veronica Mineral Springs in 1901, with offices at the Hawley Block. W. A. Hawley remained "for many years the largest stockholder" in Veronica Water.

=== 20th century ===
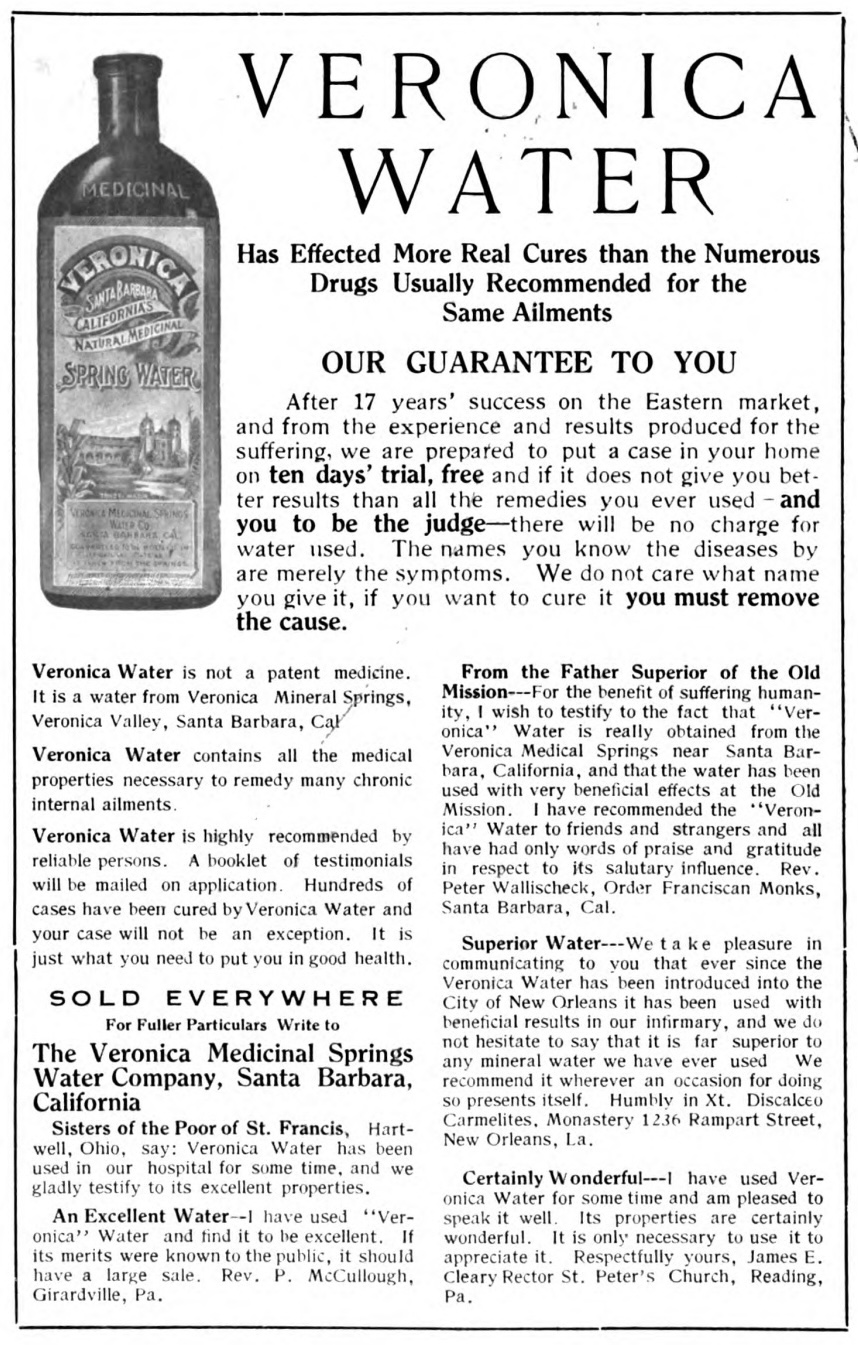
Veronica Water advertisement in Sunspot magazine, March 1916

In 1907 a promotional booklet published by California boosters described Veronica as one of five most significant springs in Santa Barbara County. Veronica was one of 44 mineral-water springs that bottled water in California in 1909.

Frederick Horace Kimball, known as Captain F. H. Kimball, took charge of Veronica Springs in 1913, and rapidly increased the company's sales volume in an era that was later recalled as the brand's peak. The company bottled and shipped about 500,000 bottles annually during the 1910s, and "Veronica water found its way into about every community in the country." Kimball capitalized on the iconography of the nearby Santa Barbara Mission and started including stylized missionary padres "taking the waters" in Veronica Water ads, under the tagline "health's missionary." Under Kimball, the company also leaned heavily on testimonials, placing ads that included lengthy positive reviews from specific customers. The World War I era was ironically a high point for California mineral waters, in part because druggists were trying to replace products that could no longer be obtained from Europe. As of 1917 Veronica Medicinal Springs were "the most commercially important springs" in Santa Barbara County.

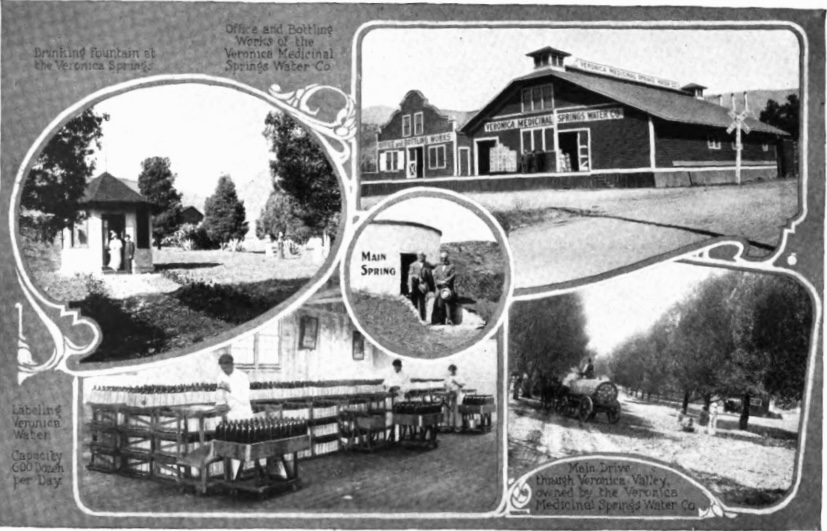
Veronica Medicinal Springs Water Co. facilities c. 1917

There was talk of building a resort. One account reported, optimistically, that there was "an exquisite hotel site just above the springs on a hill and but for the war there would now be a hotel on that hill." But nothing ever came of the sanatorium scheme. In 1923, Veronica Medicinal Springs controlled five springs on the west side of the valley, on a property totaling 140 acres (57 ha). The brand was sold in 1928. The company's headquarters were on Brannan Street in San Francisco in 1928. By the 1930s, the water was no longer bottled locally but "shipped in railroad tank cars to San Francisco and bottled by the Shasta Water Co., which distributed the water from there to the wholesale trade," and the springs were sold by the Kimball estate in 1944. Owners after Kimball were first Frank Cole and then Harold H. Mackie. The springs were still producing water after World War II, and there were plans to offer "hydrotherapy" treatments at the site for people with arthritis or high blood pressure. By the 1960s the springs were no longer used. The Veronica Springs were reportedly capped off in 1962 "because of complaints about the odor from nearby residents." In February 2016 the city of Santa Barbara bought the remaining undeveloped land in "Veronica Valley". A restoration of the riparian habitat surrounding Arroyo Burro creek is underway, and the land is now a natural area open to the public.

== Water profile ==
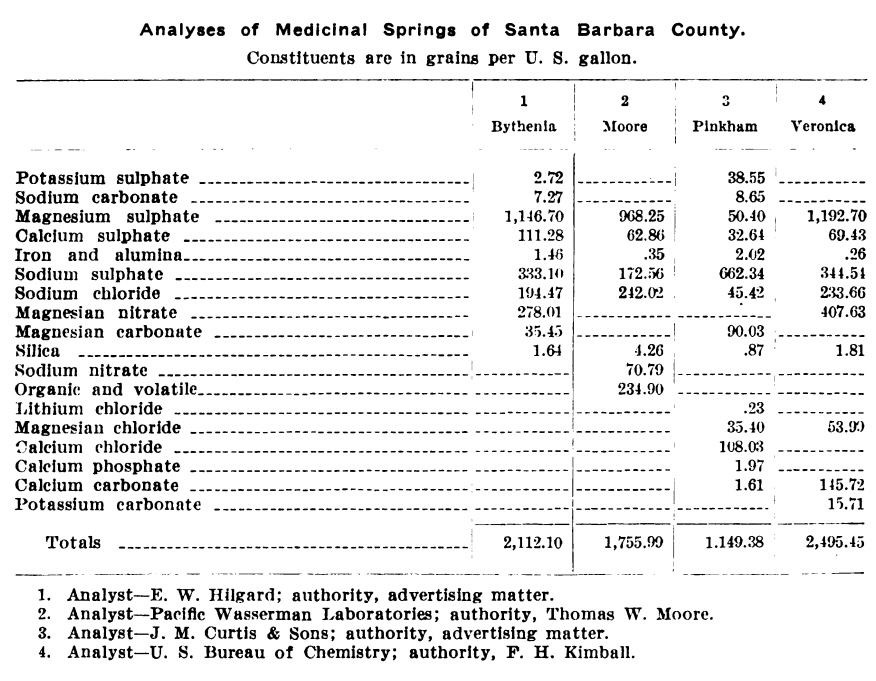
Chemical analysis of medicinal spring waters of Santa Barbara County, 1917

The major analysis of the Veronica Springs water was done in 1903 by the U.S. Bureau of Chemistry and published in Bureau of Chemistry Bull. No. 91. As of 1959, chemical analysis of water yielded the same results "as in 1903". U.S. government geologist Gerald A. Waring described Veronica Springs in 1915 as "situated on the sides of the wide drainage channel of San Roque Creek, about three-quarters of a mile northward from the ocean. The principal springs are on the western side of the creek, but water from about 12 springs, half of which are on each slope of the drainage channel, has been piped to collecting tanks in a warehouse at the principal springs. As the yield of the springs is small and the bottled product consists of the combined flow from a number of springs whose composition probably varies with the season, differences in any two analyses of the water would be expected. The remarkably high content of magnesia...seems to have been produced by concentration of the material from the ocean water by some means which is not clearly understood but which probably involved the evaporation of the water of lagoons to a bittern...The flat-topped hills on whose flanks the springs issue are composed of shales of late Tertiary age that probably belong to the Fernando formation, which has been described by Arnold. The mineralized water is said to seep from a yellow clay of the consistency of cheese." The water itself was said to be a "rich golden brownish yellow".

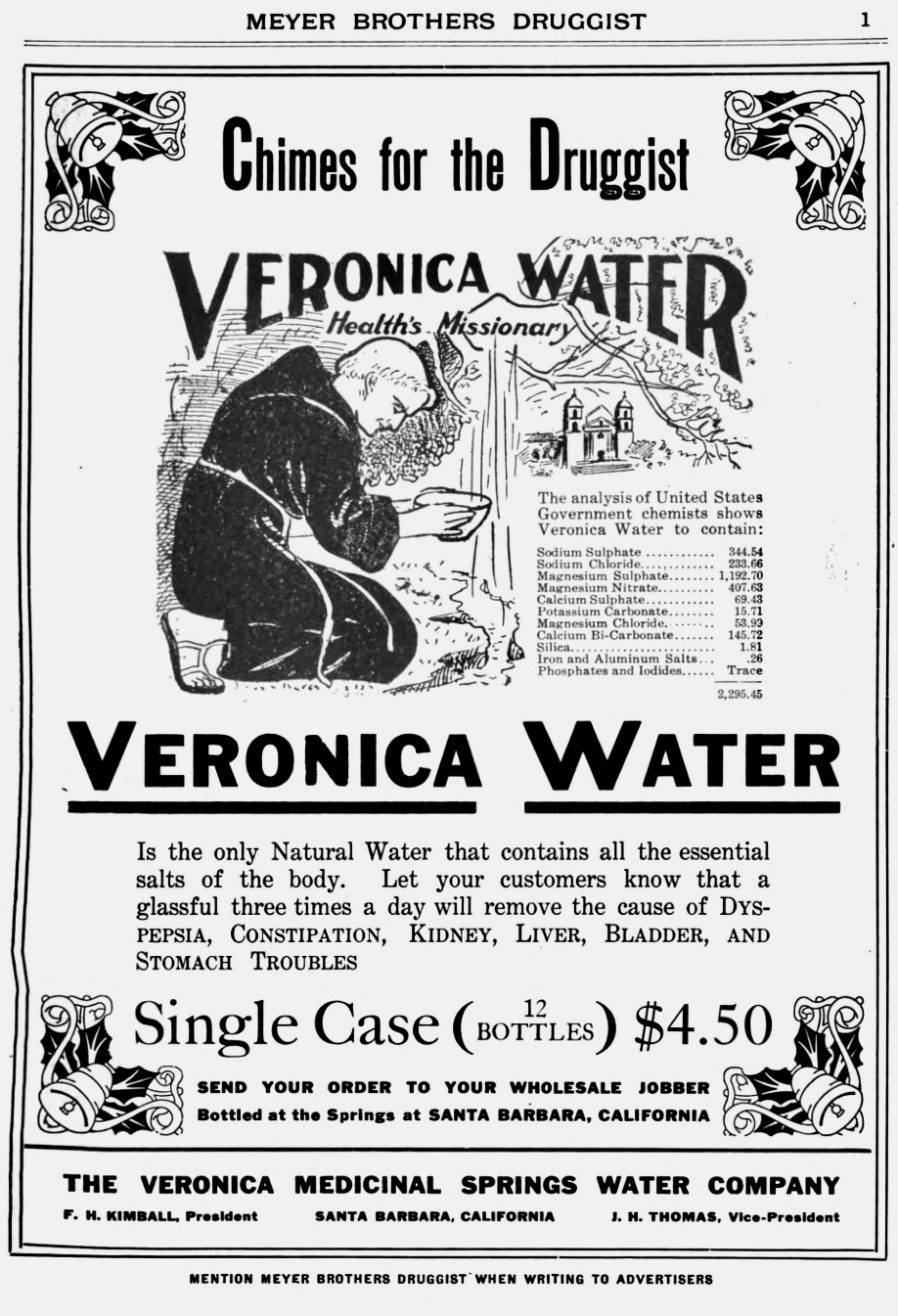
"Health's Missionary" advertisement for Veronica Water in a magazine for pharmacists, 1913

Physician William Edward Fitch included Veronica in his 1927 book Mineral Waters of the United States and American Spas, and described the medicinal effect of the water: "This is a highly mineralized, sodic, magnesic, sulphated, and muriated, saline water, possessing diuretic and purgative properties, due to the magnesium and sodium sulphates; the ingestion of this water stimulates intestinal peristalsis, increases the flow of bile, dissolves and liquefies the mucus of the intestinal tract and biliary passages. This water has been prescribed by the profession for more than 25 years for the relief of constipation and general sluggishness of bowel action."

== See also ==
- Syuxtun Village
- Gaviota Hot Springs
- Montecito Hot Springs
- Chumash traditional medicine
- California mission clash of cultures
- Rancho Las Positas y La Calera
- History of Santa Barbara, California
