= William Fisher =

William Fisher may refer to:

== Politics, government, military ==
- William Fisher (MP for Bletchingley), in 1491 MP for Bletchingley (UK Parliament constituency)
- Bill Fisher (politician) (1936–2020), Oregon state senator
- William Fisher (Nova Scotia politician) (1716–1777), farmer and politician in Nova Scotia
- William Fisher (mayor), mayor of Philadelphia, 1773–1774
- William Fisher (Royal Navy officer, born 1780) (1780–1852), British naval officer
- William Wordsworth Fisher (1875–1937), British admiral
- William Fisher (Canadian politician) (1811–1891), merchant and political figure in British Columbia, Canada
- William August Fisher (1903–1971), Soviet intelligence officer
- William Blake Fisher (1853–1926), British admiral
- William Hayes Fisher, 1st Baron Downham (1853–1920), British politician
- William Kenneth Fisher (1926–2010), Australian judge and President of the New South Wales Industrial Commission
- William S. Fisher (Texas), Republic of Texas soldier, leader of the ill-fated 1842 Mier expedition

== Other ==
- Bill Fisher (fl. 2010s–2020s), English vocalist, lead singer of Church of the Cosmic Skull
- William Fisher, the Kirk Elder of Mauchline, who inspired Burns' poem Holy Willie's Prayer
- William Fisher (painter) (1890–1985), American painter
- William Fisher (boxer) (1940–2018), Scottish boxer
- William Fisher (cricketer) (1865–1945), Australian cricketer
- William Fisher (media executive) (born 1960), media and television executive
- William Arms Fisher (1861–1948), American music historian
- W. B. Fisher (William Bayne Fisher, 1916–1984), British geographer
- William Ellsworth Fisher (1871–1937), American architect
- William Frederick Fisher (born 1946), American astronaut and emergency physician
- William S. Fisher (born 1958), director of Gap, Inc.
- William W. Fisher (born 1953), American legal academic
- William Webster Fisher (1798–1874), Downing Professor of Medicine at Cambridge University
- Willie Fisher (footballer) (1873–1910), Scottish footballer

== See also ==
- William Fish (disambiguation)
- William Fischer (disambiguation)
