= William Fitch =

William or Bill Fitch may refer to:

- William Stevenson Fitch (1793–1859), English antiquarian
- William Fitch (British Army officer) (died 1795), British soldier
- William Edward Fitch (1867–1949), American physician, surgeon and writer
- William H. Fitch (1929–2016), United States Marine Corps general
- W. Tecumseh Fitch (William Tecumseh Sherman Fitch III, born 1963), American evolutionary biologist and cognitive scientist
- Bill Fitch (1932–2022), American NBA coach
- Bill Fitch (baseball) (fl. 1926), American baseball player
- Benet Canfield (born William Benedict Fytch, 1562–1610), English mystic
- Clyde Fitch (William Clyde Fitch, 1865–1909), American dramatist

== See also ==
- William Fish (disambiguation)
