= Willie Fisher =

Willie Fisher may refer to:

- William Fisher (boxer) (1940–2018), Scottish boxer
- Willie Fisher (footballer) (1873–1910), Scottish footballer
- the Soviet spy who adopted the pseudonym Rudolf Abel (1903–1971)
