= Solman =

Solman or Šolman is a surname. Notable people with the surname include:

- Alfred Solman (1868–1937), American songwriter
- Damir Šolman (1948–2023), Croatian basketball player
- Joseph Solman (1909–2008), American painter
- Lol Solman (1863–1931), Canadian businessman
- Paul Solman, American journalist
- Riina Solman (born 1972), Estonian politician
- Selina Solman (born 1994), Vanuatuan cricketer
