= William Fischer =

William Fischer may refer to:

- Bill Fischer (Australian footballer) (1883–1917), Australian rules footballer and soldier
- Bill Fischer (American football) (1927–2017), American football player
- Bill Fischer (baseball) (1930–2018), former American Major League Baseball pitcher
- William Fischer (baseball) (1891–1945), catcher in Major League Baseball
- William S. Fischer, American composer, conductor, arranger, and producer

== See also ==
- Vilyam Genrikhovich Fisher (1903–1971), Soviet intelligence officer
- William J. Fischer Housing Development, New Orleans public-housing development
- Willy Fischler (born 1949), Belgian physicist
- William Fisher (disambiguation)
