= Douglas Family Preserve =

Historic public park in Santa Barbara, CA

Coordinates: 34.399412°N 119.734175°W

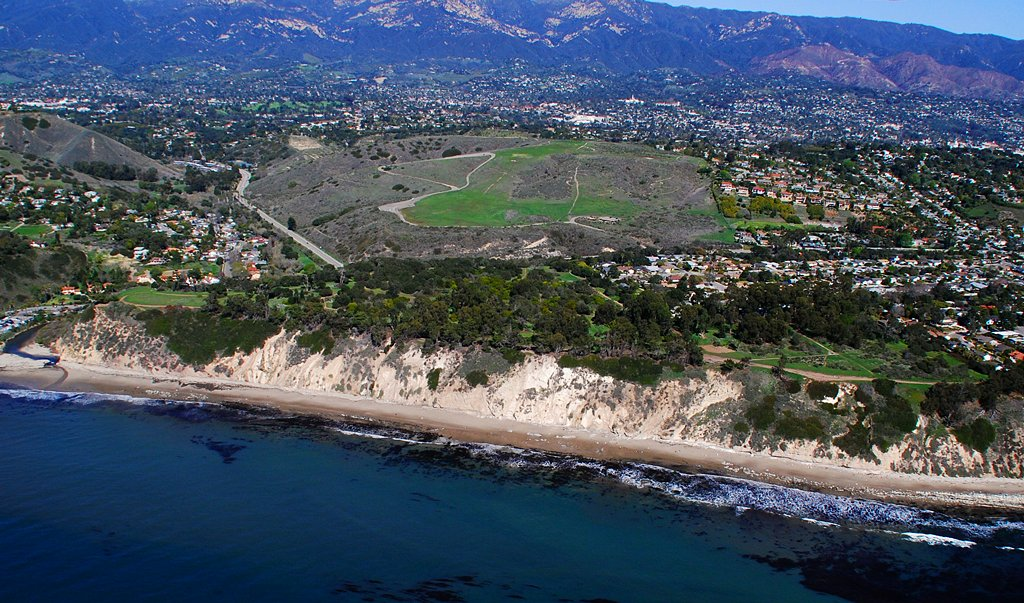
Aerial view: DFP along shoreline, Ellings beyond

The Douglas Family Preserve is a public park in Santa Barbara, California. The Preserve is located on the mesa above Arroyo Burro Beach. The property spans 70 acres (280,000 m^{2}) of undeveloped ocean-front land, and represents the largest area of coastal open space within the city limits of Santa Barbara.

Although the official name of this area is the Douglas Family Preserve (see below), residents of Santa Barbara regularly refer to it by its older name, the Wilcox Property.

== Access and Attractions ==
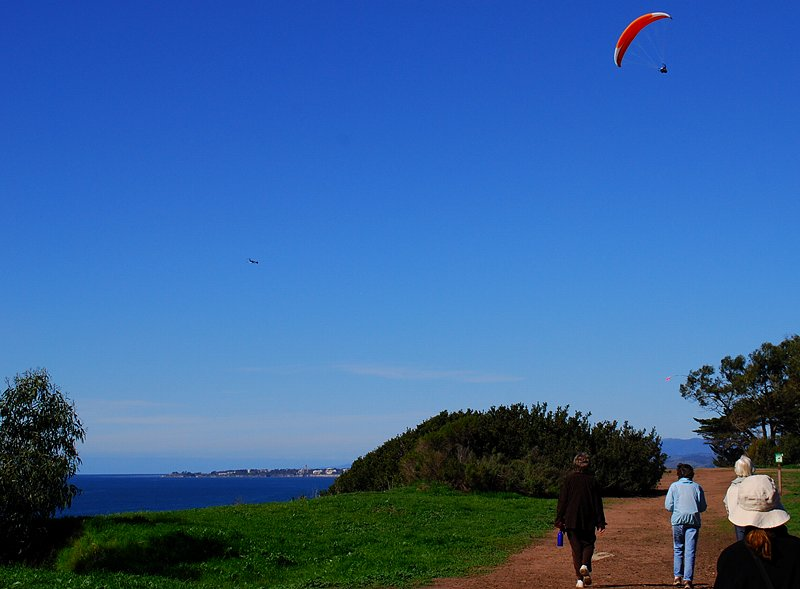
View west

A walking trail loops the park perimeter, with many smaller trails across and along the interior. The popular entrance on Medcliff Road is at grade level of the park on the scenic mesa. The main route to the park is from U.S. Route 101 south on Las Positas Road, east on Cliff Drive, south on Mesa Lane, and west on Medcliff Road to street parking near the intersection with Selrose Lane.

There are several bluffs overlooking the beach, popular for watching whales, dolphins, and birds.

Paraglider and hang glider pilots frequently launch from a cliffside spot 200 meters from the entrance, taking advantage of frequent updrafts as onshore winds are directed nearly vertically by the cliffs. With sufficient winds, pilots have reported staying aloft for hours, traversing the cliff line numerous times before landing either at the launch point itself or on the beach below. As many as 8 paragliders have been in the air at one time during exceptionally good wind conditions.

Nearby Elings Park can be seen from the north side of the Preserve across an east-west valley with a street, Cliff Drive, running thru it. Elings Park is an internationally known spot for paragliding and hang gliding, and pilots can be seen there most days. Due to the pattern of wind and terrain interactions, updrafts at the Douglas Preserve cliff correlate to downdrafts over the Cliff Drive canyon, becoming updrafts once more at Elings Park. This wind pattern, with its consistent downdraft in the middle, unfortunately makes it virtually impossible for paragliders from Elings Park to gain sufficient altitude to fly from Elings to the Preserve, and extremely difficult even for hang gliders with their flatter glide angles. The extremely rare times when such feats have been accomplished have become celebrated as local lore.

Near the east entrance, just north of the bluffs and main path, there is an area with plantings of many native plant species. Foundations of earlier developments and buildings may be seen in several places, along with remnants of paved roads. Several species of birds and animals may be seen at different times of the year.

A second entrance is from Arroyo Burro Beach parking east via a sidewalk along the south side of Cliff Drive and turning south to a pedestrian bridge over Mesa Creek and estuary, continuing to a well-developed shaded trail up the hillside to connect with the main preserve perimeter trail.

Dogs are permitted off-leash within designated areas at the Preserve, making it a favorite location for canine owners. Others use it for hiking, strolling and jogging.

== History ==
The property was the site of the Wilcox nursery, created in 1949 by Roy Wilcox. The nursery closed in 1972. Soon after, several development proposals were put forward, including plans for a luxury hotel, a residential subdivision, and a retirement community. In 1996 Santa Barbara residents raised more than $2 million to help the Trust for Public Land purchase the Wilcox Property for $3.6 million. The property, now a city park, was named "Douglas Family Preserve," in recognition of the $600,000 contribution towards acquiring the park by actor Michael Douglas.

== See also ==
- Santa Barbara, California
- Arroyo Burro Beach
