= W. A. Hawley =

American businessman and writer (1863–1920)

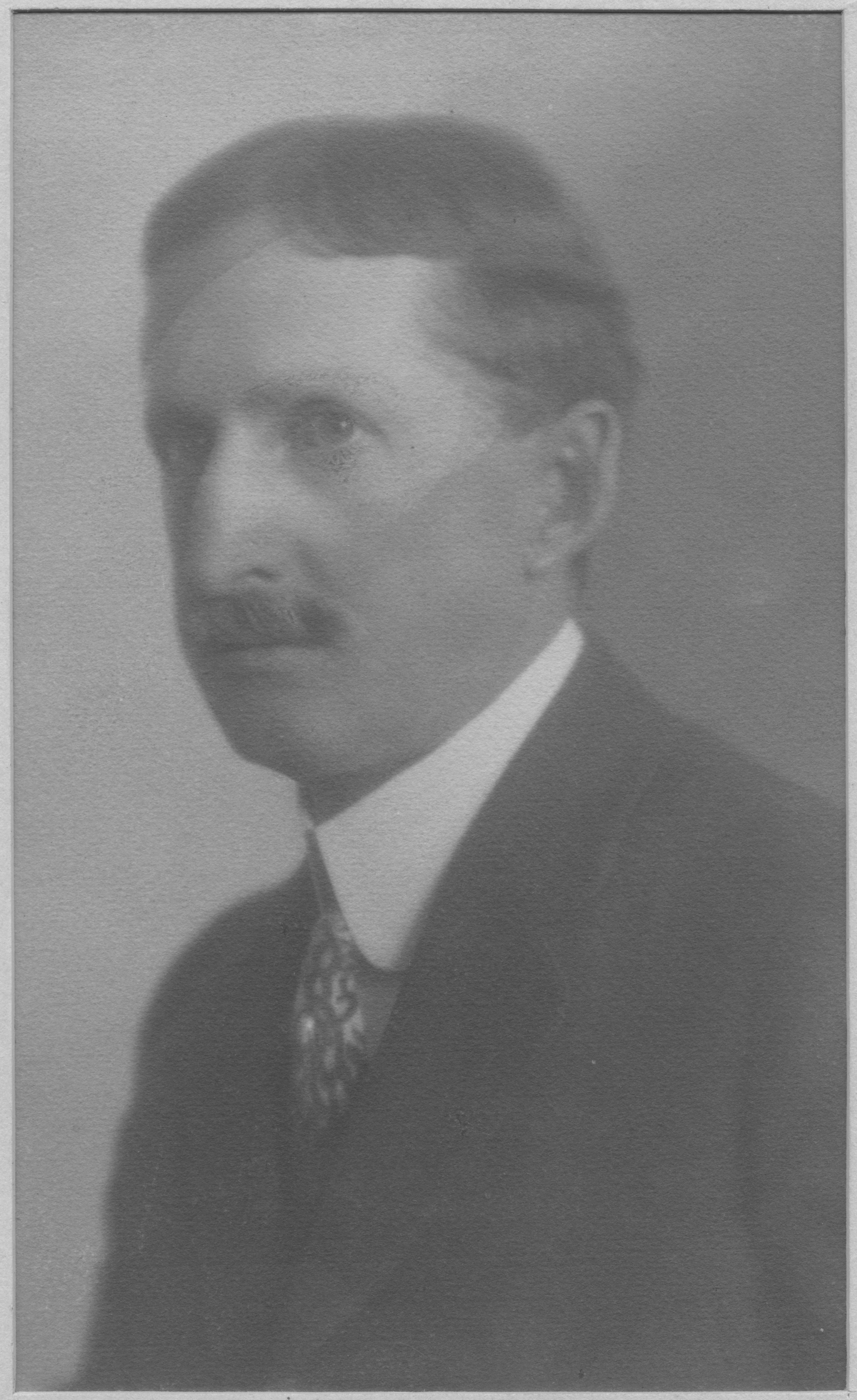
Hawley

Walter Augustus Hawley (January 16, 1863 – March 18, 1920) was a Californian businessman and writer from Santa Barbara who served as representative from California's 74th State Assembly district for the 1890–1891 term. Born in San Francisco, Hawley attended Yale University, and would have been class of 1885, but left after his third year and did not graduate. He moved to California with his family in the 1880s, where he and his brother started out selling wagons, buggies, and farm equipment. Together with his father and brothers, Hawley developed the Hawley Heights neighborhood of Santa Barbara and owned the Veronica Springs water company. In later life he wrote three books: a travelogue, a guide to oriental rugs, and a history of the Santa Barbara area. He also "personally superintended the building of La Cumbre trail". Hawley was buried in California.

== Publications ==
He published numerous songs. With composer J. Schmalz, he wrote the lyrics to "The Crib in Which I Used to Sleep", published in 1893 by Ilsen & Co.. He wrote both words and music for "Little Maggie Monehan, or, The Belle of the Ball", popularized by Bella Gold and published by James Horton the same year. His "Pretty Mamie Carey" was published by Wolf Music in 1895. In 1896, Henry White published "If We Had Never Met". The Sisters Engstrom popularized "You'll Find a Girl to Please You Here in Town", which was published by Myll Bros in 1897. Also in 1897, he published "Sally, the Pride of Dorothy's Alley", with was popularized by Rose Sutherland and Lillie Sutherland, also published by Mylll Bros. He wrote at least two coon songs popularized by Flo Irwin, including "I'll Carve Dat Nigger When We Meet", which was published as a supplement to the San Francisco Examiner in 1898, and "That Nigger Treated Me all Right", published the same year by Will Rossiter. His "At the Post" was published by M. Witmark and Sons in 1903. Also in 1903, he began collaborating with Alfred Solman. His World War I anthem, "Watch the Bee Go Get the Hun", was published by Meyer & Cohen Music in 1918. Thomas P. Walsh, in his American Songs of War And Love, 1898-1946, A Resource Guide, says that he "could not resist lyrics like 'choclate-color'd dazzler'."
