= Arroyo Burro Beach =

Beach in Santa Barbara, California, U.S.

Coordinates: 34.40295°N 119.7439666°W

Arroyo Burro Beach Park
- Hendry's Beach
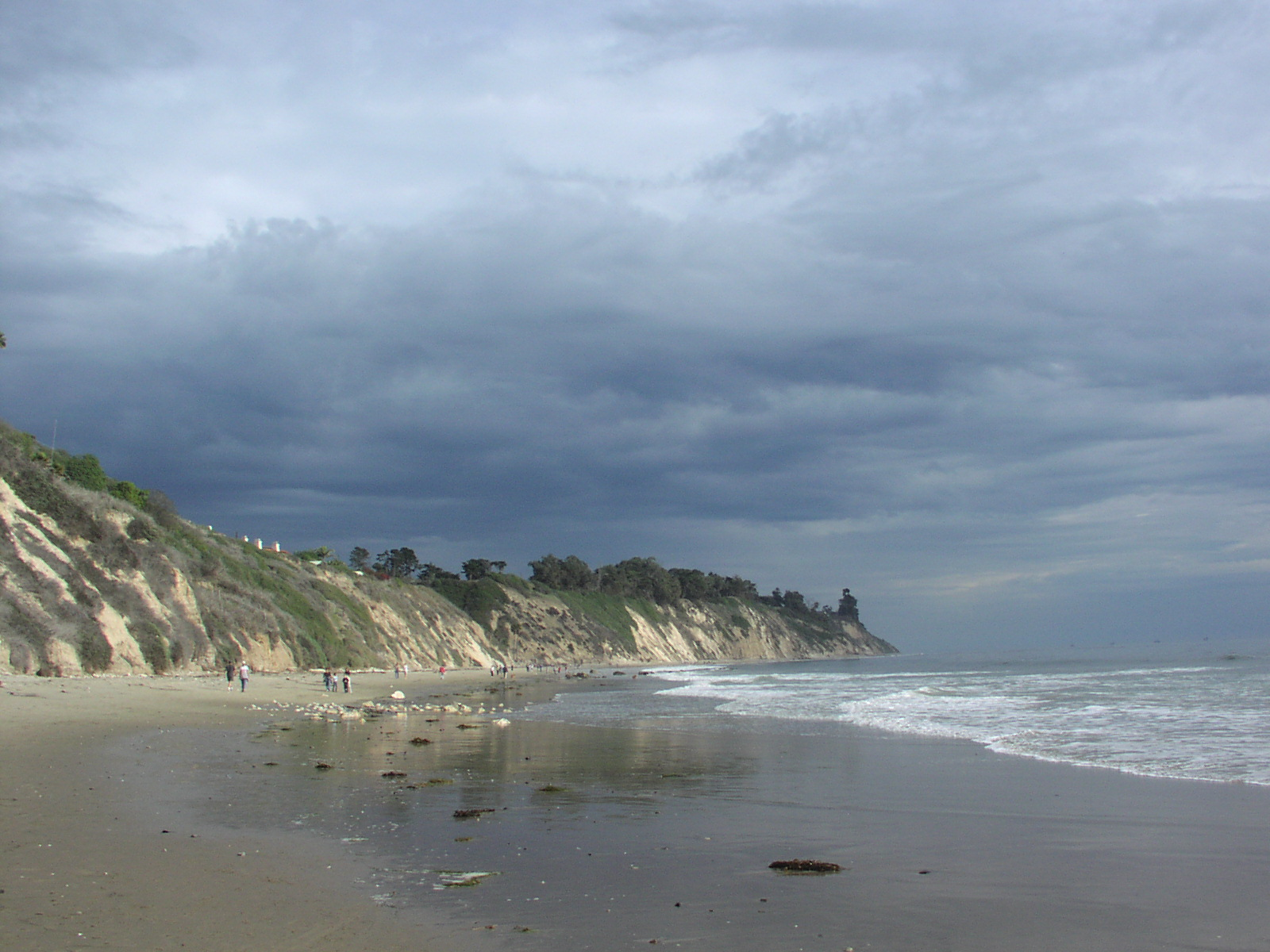
- Arroyo Burro Beach, looking east, with the Wilcox Property (i.e. the Douglas Family Preserve) atop the cliffs to the left.
- Interactive map of Arroyo Burro Beach Park
- Location: Cliff Drive, near Hope Ranch in Santa Barbara, California; Located about 5 mi (8.0 km) west of Santa Barbara's city center.
- Area: 13.8 acres (6 ha)
- Created: 6 acres (2 ha) purchased (plus 6.8 acres leased) from State in 1947; State granted leased land to County in 1968; 1 acre granted for parking from private land trust in the 1990s
- Operator: Santa Barbara County Community Services Department - Parks Division
- Open: 8am - Sunset
- Website: Arroyo Burro Beach Park

Arroyo Burro Beach, also known as Hendry's Beach by local residents, is a public beach in Santa Barbara, California. Located off of Cliff Drive, it is the terminus of Arroyo Burro Creek, and stands at the foot of the Santa Barbara coastal bluffs of the Wilcox Property (i.e. Douglas Family Preserve), which is adjacent to the east. The community of Hope Ranch is about 1 mi (1.6 km) to the west.

Arroyo Burro has a reputation as a dog beach and is a popular location for dog owners to walk their pets off leash, though Arroyo Burro itself is actually on-leash (the off-leash area is just east below the Douglas Family Preserve). Surfers also frequent the beach's waters, and outdoor showers facilitate the sport. The beach's other recreational features include a grassy area with picnic tables and barbecue grills, the Arroyo Burro County Park building which houses a restaurant and snack bar with outdoor and indoor seating, and a building constructed out of recycled and reclaimed materials that houses an ecological education center known as the Watershed Resource Center. The park officially opens at 8:00 am and closes at sunset, at which time entrance to the (free) parking lot is prohibited. However, vehicles parked before sunset can remain into the evening hours.

A once popular restaurant known as The Brown Pelican formerly situated overlooking the beach closed in November 2007, after the Santa Barbara County Board of Supervisors declined to renew their lease of twenty-five years. The Boathouse opened up in August 2008 in its place, with new owners and significant remodeling.

== History ==
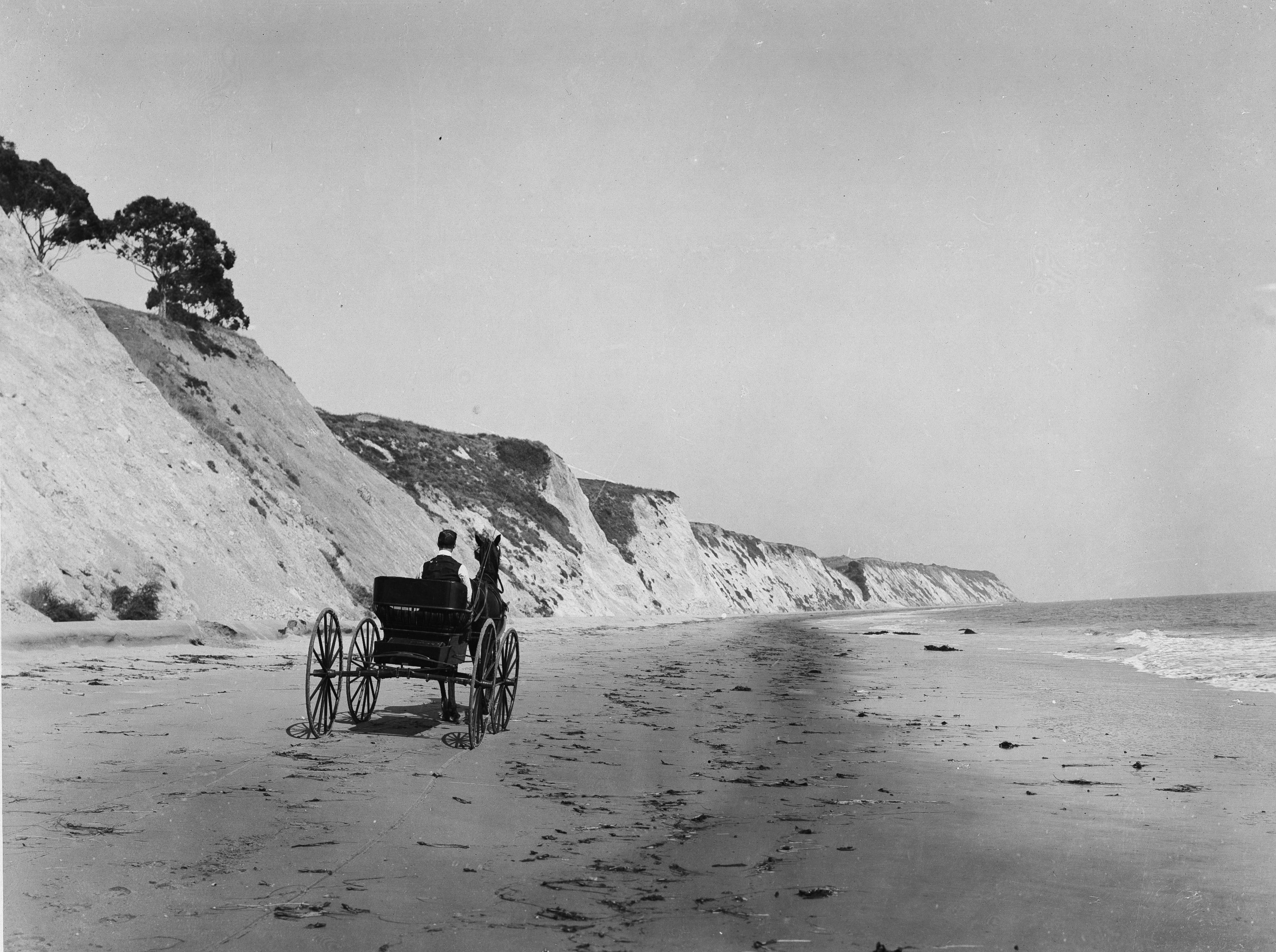
Cliffs of Hendry's Beach, looking eastward, circa 1900.

The Hendry's Beach name is used by local residents, as the nearby farm land (now replaced by homes) was the home of Scottish immigrants William Nicol Hendry and Anne Stronach Hendry and their twelve children. Hendry, who arrived in Santa Barbara circa 1872, initially worked as an agricultural laborer for Ellwood Cooper at his Goleta Valley ranch for a number of years before becoming a substantial landholder himself. By 1884, Hendry leased over 360 acres (146 ha) in the vicinity of Arroyo Burro, including Veronica Springs and portions of Hope Ranch. He principally cultivated hay, oats, barley, and most profitably lima beans. The Hendry family inhabited the area until 1918, when William sold the farm for $80,000 and moved his family to Chapala Street in downtown Santa Barbara.

In 1947, with assistance of the State of California, Santa Barbara County purchased the land that comprises the current day park, including 5.5 acres (2 ha) and 500 ft (150 m) of beachfront along the mouth of Arroyo Burro Creek for $15,000. Subsequently, an additional 100 ft (30 m) of adjoining beachfront property was donated to the County. In 1968, the State conveyed an adjoining 6.8 acre parcel of formerly leased land to the County for the park. During the 1990s, a private land trust granted an acre of land abutting the northeast of the park to serve as a supplementary parking area.

== Ecology ==
With an annual visitation exceeding 800,000, the beach park has experienced non-point source urban runoff induced exceedances of coliform bacteria, ranging from 7 to 23 days annually between 2002-2006. Efforts have been undertaken by the County to curb the pollution source by mitigating oil, grease, animal waste, and the resulting contaminated stormwater that reaches the ocean.

From June 2006 to January 2007, the City of Santa Barbara implemented the Arroyo Burro Estuary and Mesa Creek Restoration Project to restore coastal and riparian sage scrub habitats and improve water quality in the estuary, Arroyo Burro beach, and Mesa Creek (a tributary of Arroyo Burro Creek). Part of the project entailed the removal and conversion of an underground concrete culvert that had diverted a significant portion of Mesa Creek and reduced the natural width of the estuary from 500 ft (150 m) to about 50 ft (15 m). This had further resulted in reduced water quality, obstacles to fish passage, and the migration of invasive plant species into impacted areas of the estuary. Outcomes of the 2006 restoration project included benefits to the endangered tidewater goby via the expansion of the estuary, and southern steelhead trout through the implementation of fish passage enhancements.

As of 2010, coliform contamination had continued to beset the estuary and the beach from sewage spills and other unknown sources. Over the course of a few years the city increased the cleaning regime of its sewer-pipes, reducing spills from an unprecedented 44 incidents during 2009 to 35 in 2010, down to 12 in 2011. Nevertheless, in February 2011, a local environmental advocacy organization filed a Clean Water Act lawsuit against the City of Santa Barbara to initiate a comprehensive refit of its sewer infrastructure. After a negotiated 2012 settlement, the City implemented a $26m five-year capital program which nearly doubled the mileage of sewer pipes that it had formerly maintained, and targeted those areas of highest risk of stormwater exfiltration.

Further efforts to preserve Arroyo Burro Creek have been made by the City of Santa Barbara and The Trust for Public Land by the purchase of Veronica Springs, a 14.7 acre parcel of upstream open space and natural area about 0.5 mi (0.80 km) north of the park. In 2016, the area was protected as a municipal park and wildlife area and renamed Arroyo Burro Park. The City's Parks and Recreation Department Creeks Division has plans to undertake a comprehensive restoration project to stabilize the banks of the lower Arroyo Burro creek, which will improve its water quality and the wildlife habitat.

== Improvements ==
In early 2021, the County Parks Division completed a host of site improvements financed via development impact fees in addition to the park's annual park maintenance budget. The $1,380,000 project comprised upgrades to the irrigation system; the installation of a water-collection cistern, drought tolerant landscaping, ADA-compliant pathways, security cameras, and approximately 17,000 square feet of streetscape improvements including enhanced seating near the bus stop and dog wash areas; the reconfiguration of the fencing; and the replacement of the former 330-square foot ranger office and maintenance building.

== Gallery ==
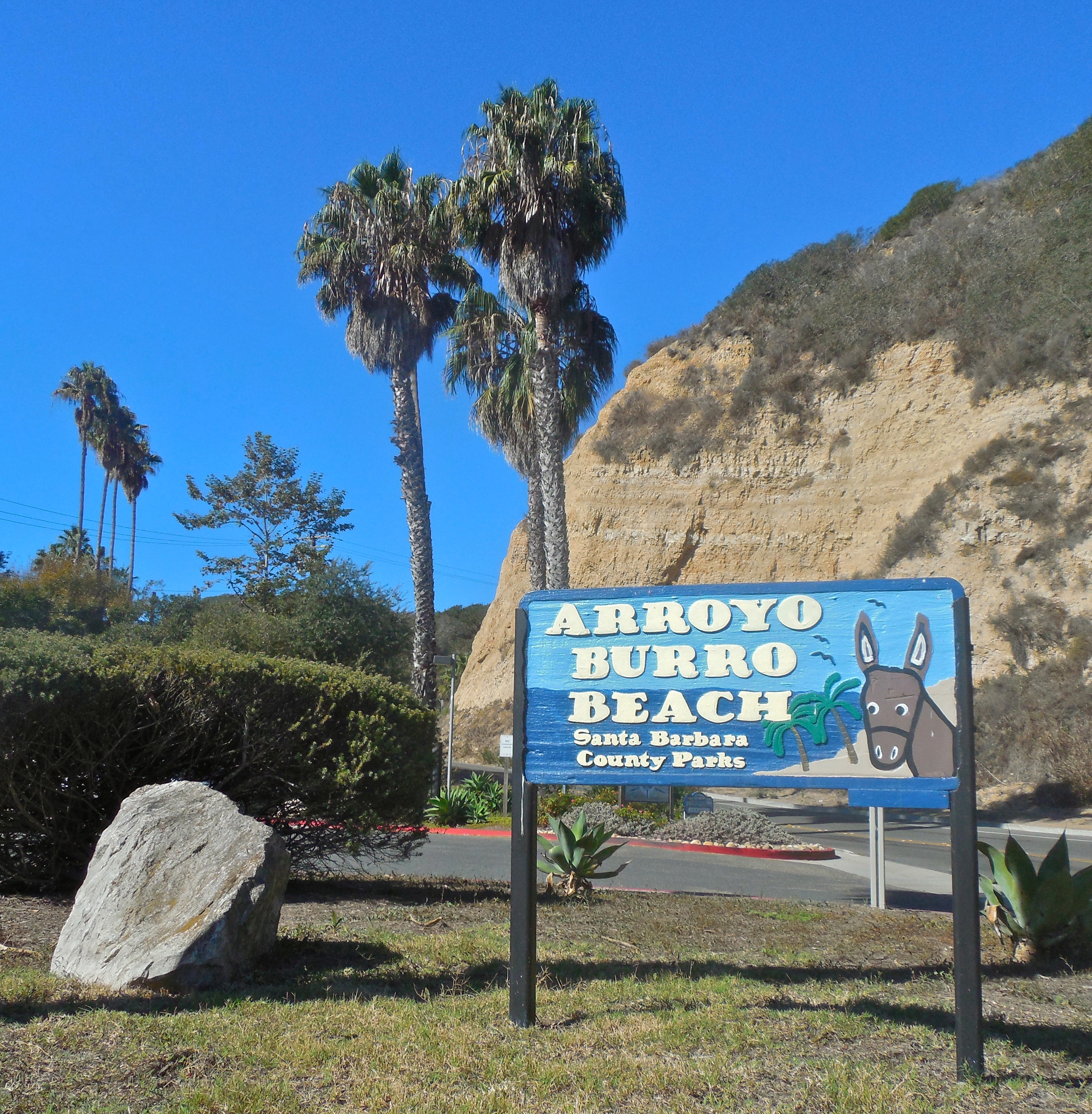
Arroyo Burro Beach park entrance

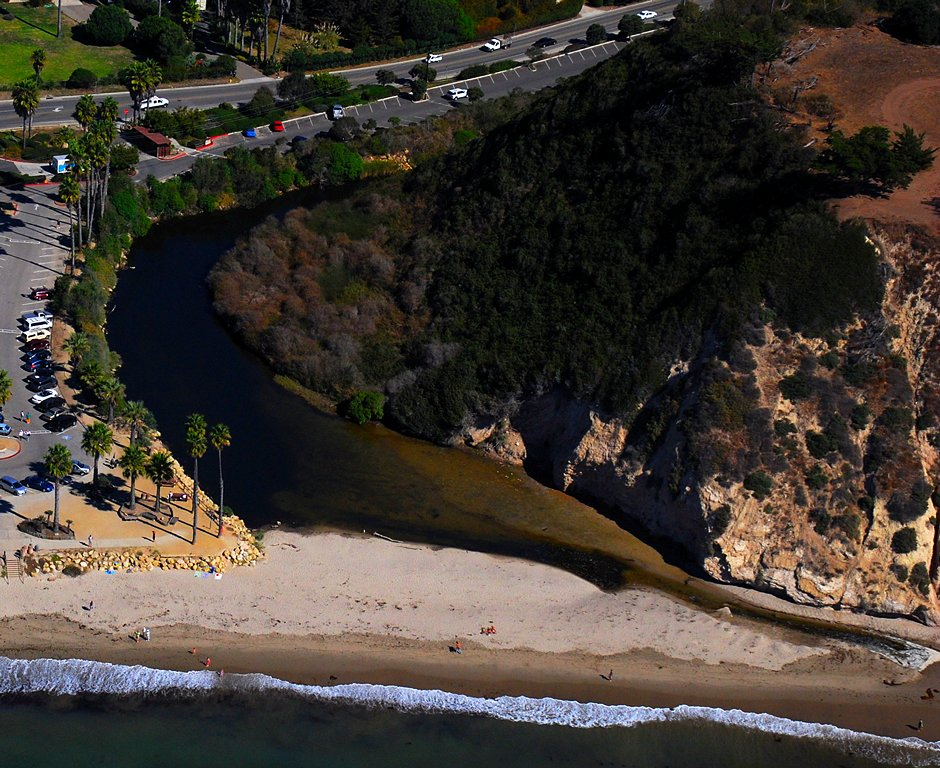
Aerial view of the Arroyo Burro Creek (center), the County Beach (left), and the western edge of the Douglas Family Preserve park atop the mesa (right).

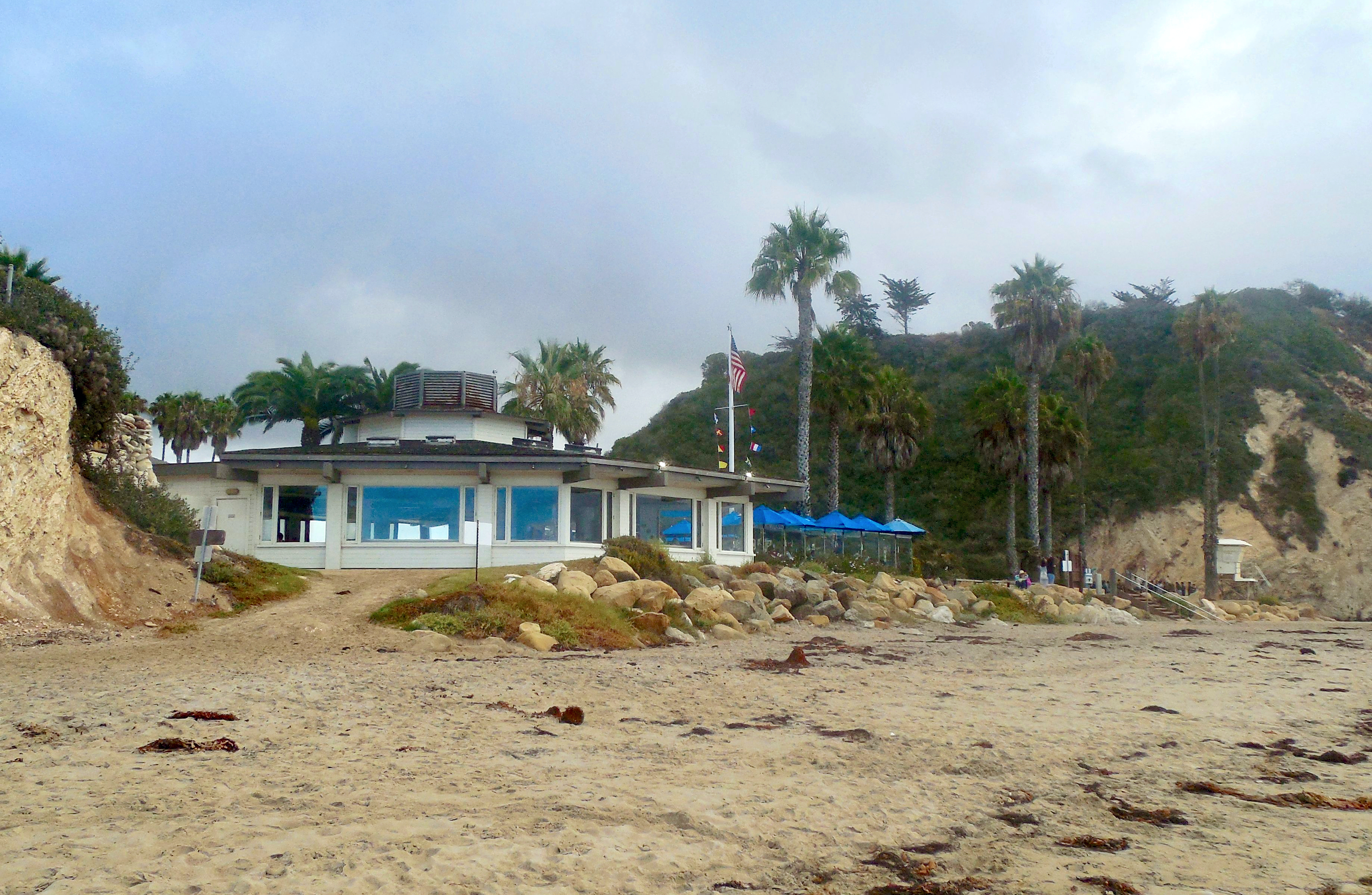
Arroyo Burro Beach County Park Building

== See also ==
- List of beaches in California
- List of California state parks
