= San Roque Canyon =

Valley in California, United States

San Roque Canyon is a valley in Santa Barbara County, California. San Roque Creek tributary to Arroyo Burro flows through it. The Canyon heads at a point at an elevation of 3,400 feet / 1,000 meters, at 34°29′34″N 119°42′58″W, 0.8 miles west of La Cumbre Peak and trends south-southwest four miles to 34°26′20″N 119°44′41″W, near the confluence of San Roque Creek with Arroyo Burro at an elevation of 187 feet / 57 meters.
