= William Fish =

William Fish may refer to:

- William Fish (Scarborough MP), English member of parliament for Scarborough, 1588–1589
- William Fish (musician) (1775–1866), English violinist, organist and composer
- William H. Fish (1849–1926), associate justice and chief justice of the Supreme Court of Georgia
- William Fish, mayor of Cape Town, South Africa, 1925–1927
- W. B. Fisher (born William Bayne Fish, 1916–1984), British geographer
- Will Fish (born 2003), English footballer

== See also ==
- William Fisher (disambiguation)
- William Fitch (disambiguation)
- Billy Fish, fictional character in the 1975 film The Man Who Would Be King
