= Arroyo Burro =

Natural stream in California

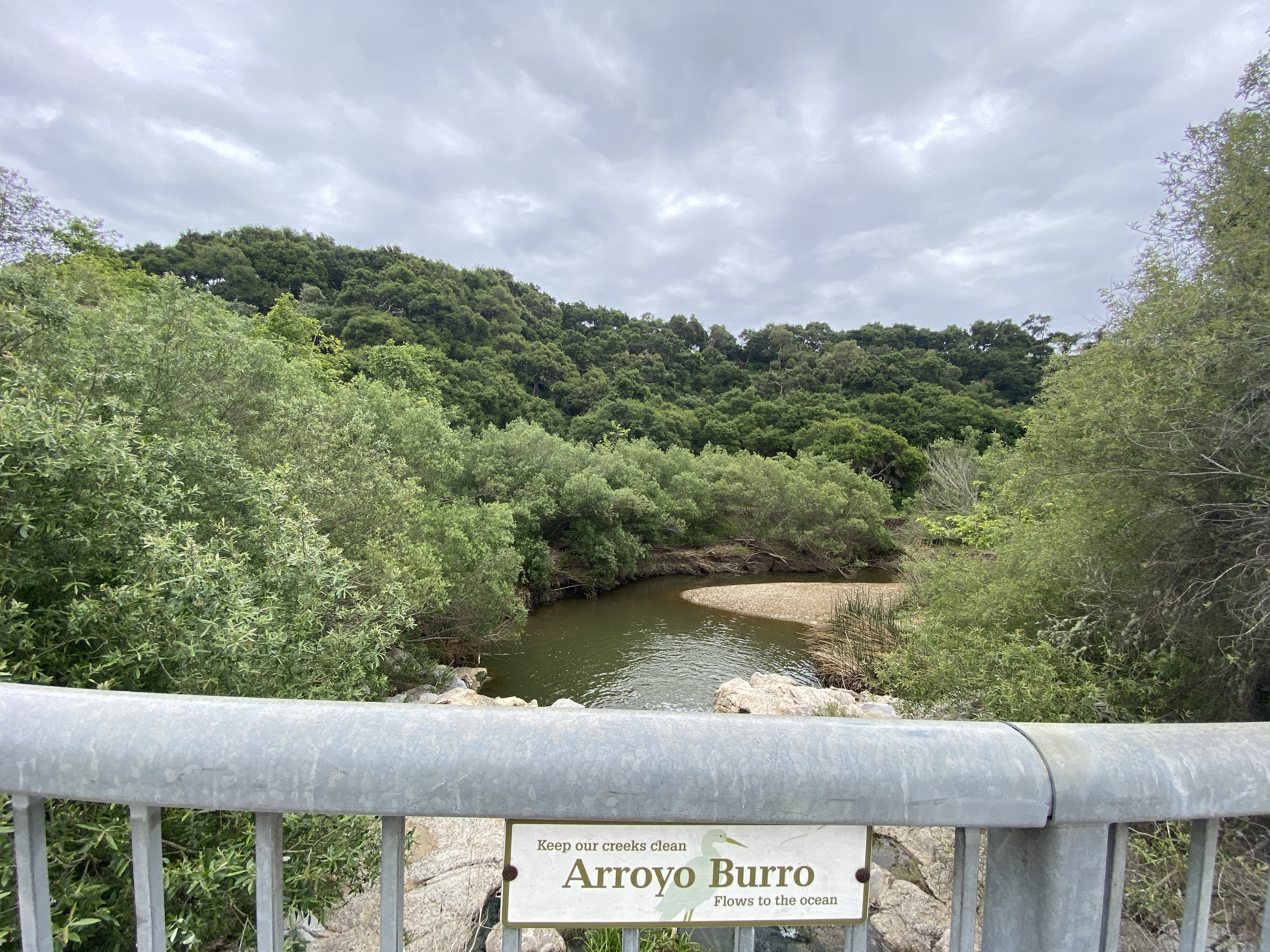
Arroyo Burro, Santa Barbara County, California (2024)

Arroyo Burro or Arroyo Burro Creek is a stream in Santa Barbara County, California, United States.

Arroyo Burro is 6 miles (9.7 km) long. Its source is in the Santa Ynez Mountains at the head of Barger Canyon at an elevation of 1,550 feet (470 m) at 34°28′49″N 119°44′39″W. It trends south to its confluence with the Santa Barbara Channel of the Pacific Ocean, 2.3 miles (3.7 km) west of Santa Barbara Point in the Arroyo Burro Beach County Park.
