= William Stevenson Fitch =

William Stevenson Fitch (1793–1859) was an English antiquarian.

== Life ==
Fitch was for more than 21 years postmaster of Ipswich, but devoted his leisure to studying the antiquities of Suffolk. He made full collections for a history of that county. Most of them appear to have been dispersed by auction after his death, though the West Suffolk Archaeological Association, of which he was a founder, purchased the drawings and engravings, arranged in more than thirty quarto volumes, and they were deposited in the museum of the society at Bury St. Edmunds.

Fitch is known to have acted as a dealer in the archives of country houses to which he had access, selling many papers to which he had no rights. He died 17 July 1859, leaving a widow, a daughter, and two sons.

== Works ==
Fitch published:

- A Catalogue of Suffolk Memorial Registers, Royal Grants, (in his possession), Great Yarmouth, 1843.
- Ipswich and its Early Mints (Ipswich), 1848.

He contributed notices of coins and antiquities found in Suffolk to the Journal of the British Archaeological Association (vols. i. ii. iii. xxi.), and contributed to the Proceedings of the East Suffolk Archaeological Society.
