= Alfred Solman =

American composer (1868–1937)

"The Bird on Nellie's Hat"
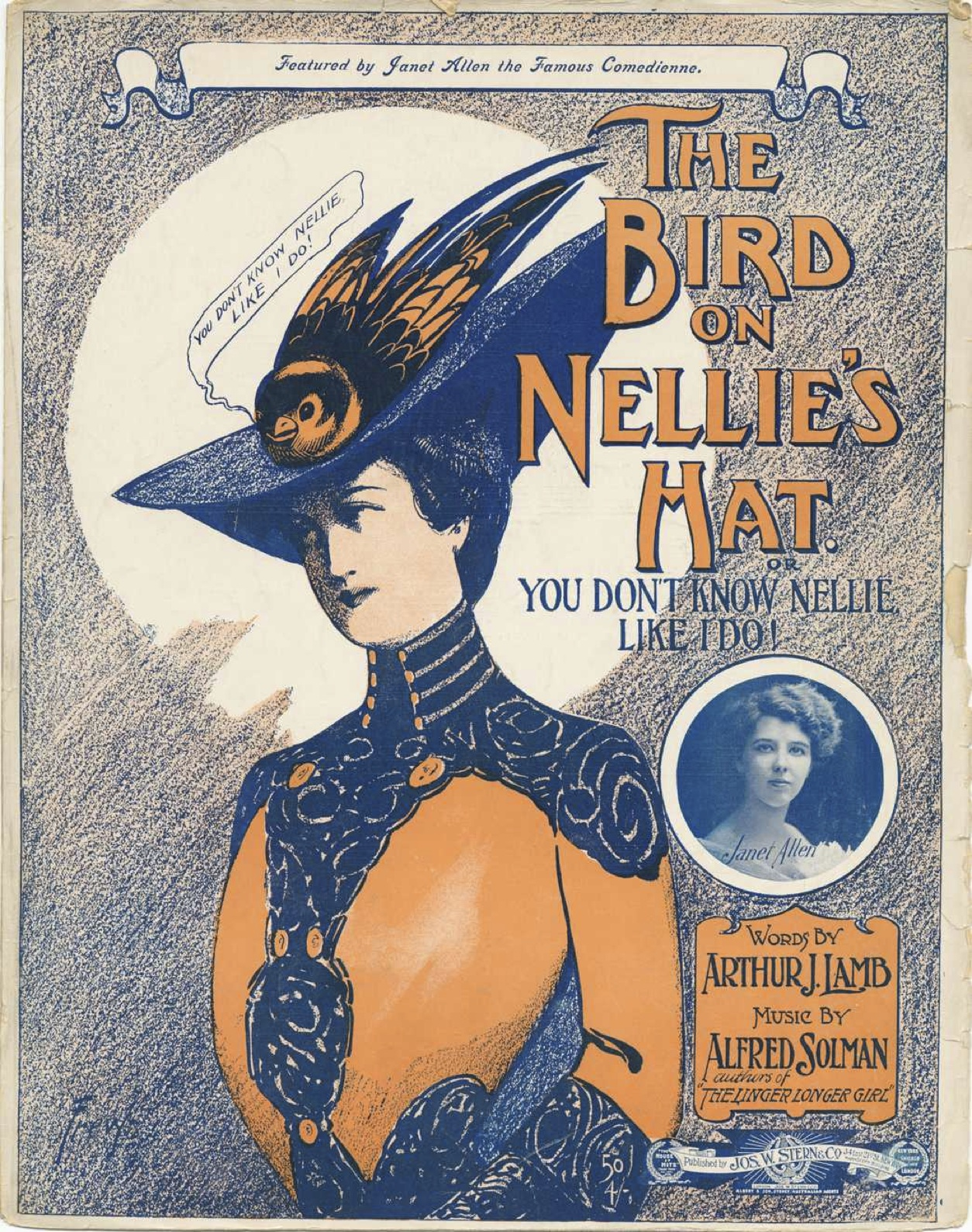

Song
- Language: English
- Written: 1906
- Published: 1906
- Composer: Alfred Solman
- Lyricist: Arthur J. Lamb

Alfred Solman (May 6, 1868 – November 15, 1937) was a prominent composer of popular songs in America in the first two decades of the twentieth century.

== Biography ==
Alfred Solman (Saloman or Salomon prior to 1894) was born in Berlin, Kingdom of Prussia, and educated at the Berlin Conservatory of Music. He arrived in the United States on February 8, 1894, with his wife Eugenie and young son Kurt (later Curt), settling in Chicago, where he worked as a musician or music teacher and where his daughter Lucy (sometimes Lucille) was born on December 1, 1895. Salmon's cousin, Victor Kremer, had immigrated on November 29, 1892, and by 1898 Kremer had formed a music publishing firm and issued Solman's first song, “Miss Phoebe Johnsing.” Kremer and the Solman family shared a residence from 1898 to 1900, and during or shortly after that time the Solman couple became estranged and then divorced. On July 6, 1903, Eugenia Saloman married Victor Kremer.

After the breakup of his marriage Alfred Solman led a somewhat restless life. In 1902 he was in San Francisco, writing songs and appearing in vaudeville as a baritone. By December 1903 he was in New York City, where he joined with Walter Hawley to write sketches and monologues as well as songs. The following year he signed an exclusive contract with Joseph W. Stern & Co.; and from then until 1911, Stern published nearly all of Solman's songs. Solman remained in New York through the decade, though he maintained a presence in Chicago and went to Europe at least once, in 1910. He remained very interested in theatre, writing music for Paris by Night (1904), The Errand Boy (1906), and other shows and revues; and he and Harry Bissing, a stage electrician, formed a short-lived management company.

In 1910 Solman won a prize offered by Carl Laemmle, a Chicago publisher and film maker. Jos. W. Stern & Co. sued for $10,000 in damages on the grounds that, at the time, it had Solman under an exclusive contract. Stern eventually won, though the case took three years to conclude; in the meantime, and probably as a consequence, Solman left Stern and signed a contract with Laemmle. Less than a year later Laemmle sold its music catalogue to Joe Morris, Inc., and Solman signed a new contract with Morris, continuing with that firm (though not exclusively) until the end of his career.

Solman evidently remained on good terms with his children and his former wife. His son Curt (who took the surname Kremer) became a hotel and restaurant pianist; his daughter Lucille (also sometimes Kremer) wrote a small number of songs, some in partnership with her father. All the Kremers had moved to San Diego by 1913, and Solman made extended trips to Southern California in the summers of 1913 and 1914. Perhaps as a result of these, or perhaps through his connection with Laemmle, Solman began writing film scenarios and scripts in 1916, first for Fox and then for Bluebird.

In 1920 his exclusive contract with Joe Morris ended, and Solman began to place his songs with other publishers. Musical tastes were changing, and Solman became associated with “old-time” music; he wrote fewer songs and placed more of them with outlying firms in Cleveland and Kansas City. A brief flurry of interest arose when an early song was used in a 1936 film, and the following year E. B. Marks promoted Solman's final song, “Try Tappin’,” by announcing Solman’s “return” to composing. Solman's son Curt moved to New York in the mid-1930s, and Solman was living with him at the time of his death.

== Composer ==
Nearly all of Alfred Solman's compositions are popular songs, but they range across several genres. Solman wrote scripts and skits, but he rarely wrote his own lyrics. His most enduring partnership was with Arthur J. Lamb, from 1904 until Lamb's death in 1928; other noteworthy collaborators were Monroe H. Rosenfeld, Alfred Bryan, and Arthur Lange. His most enduring song was a comic novelty, “The Bird on Nellie’s Hat” (lyrics by Lamb), published in 1906, interpolated in Eugene O’Neill’s Ah, Wilderness! in 1933, converted into a cartoon short in 1939, and featured in music-hall revivals in the 1960s. Similar songs are dotted through his career; indeed, his final publication, “Try Tappin’” (lyrics by his son, Curt Kremer), belongs to this genre.

However, Solman was more celebrated for “high-class” ballads, telling tales of love or absence and utilizing compound meters, long, arching lines, and chromatic harmonies. Among his greatest successes were “If I Had a Thousand Lives to Live” and “Mine”; with Lamb he produced a trio of notable “bell” songs: “When the Bell in the Lighthouse Rings Ding Dong”, “The Sexton and the Bell,” and “Bells of the Sea.” Songs of this type were well suited for early recordings; over fifty Solman titles (usually “high-class” ballads) were issued by Edison and Victor alone in the first twenty years of the century by major artists like Henry Burr and Reinald Werrenrath.

Ballads had some of the prestige associated with art song; but Solman's aspirations were greater, at least in his early years. A 1908 profile described him as a “cultured musician” who “has had little opportunity to write the class of music for which he is temperamentally suited.” At the turn of the century Solman did take on a few more ambitious projects, such as “The Way of the Cross,” an extended sacred anthem for solo voice, and Daddy Longlegs, a collection of over twenty short songs designed for children to texts by James O’Dea, with illustrations by Edgar Keller.

A final, quite large number of songs arose out of Solman's lifelong fascination with theatre and film. His songs for Paris by Night (1904) included both ballads and novelties, and through the 1920s he contributed material to many shows and revues. When he became involved with film he wrote songs that could serve both as stage numbers and as film themes; “Bells of the Sea,” for instance, was performed by Joseph Martel in a dramatic scene that led directly into the music for a feature film.

Solman was not a remarkable innovator, but he was productive and consistent. He was actively sought by music publishers, especially for sentimental ballads, until changing tastes in the 1920s relegated his music to an “old-time” style.

== Further reading and digital resources ==
- The ASCAP Biographical Dictionary, 2nd edition, ed. Daniel I. McNamara; Binghamton, NY: The Vail-Ballou Press, Inc., 1952.
- “Alfred Solman, 69, Song-hit Composer,” [obituary] The New York Times, November 24, 1937, p. 23.
- IN Harmony: Sheet Music from Indiana
- Historic American Sheet Music (Duke University)
