= Santa Barbara Point =

Coordinates: 34°23′52″N 119°42′08″W

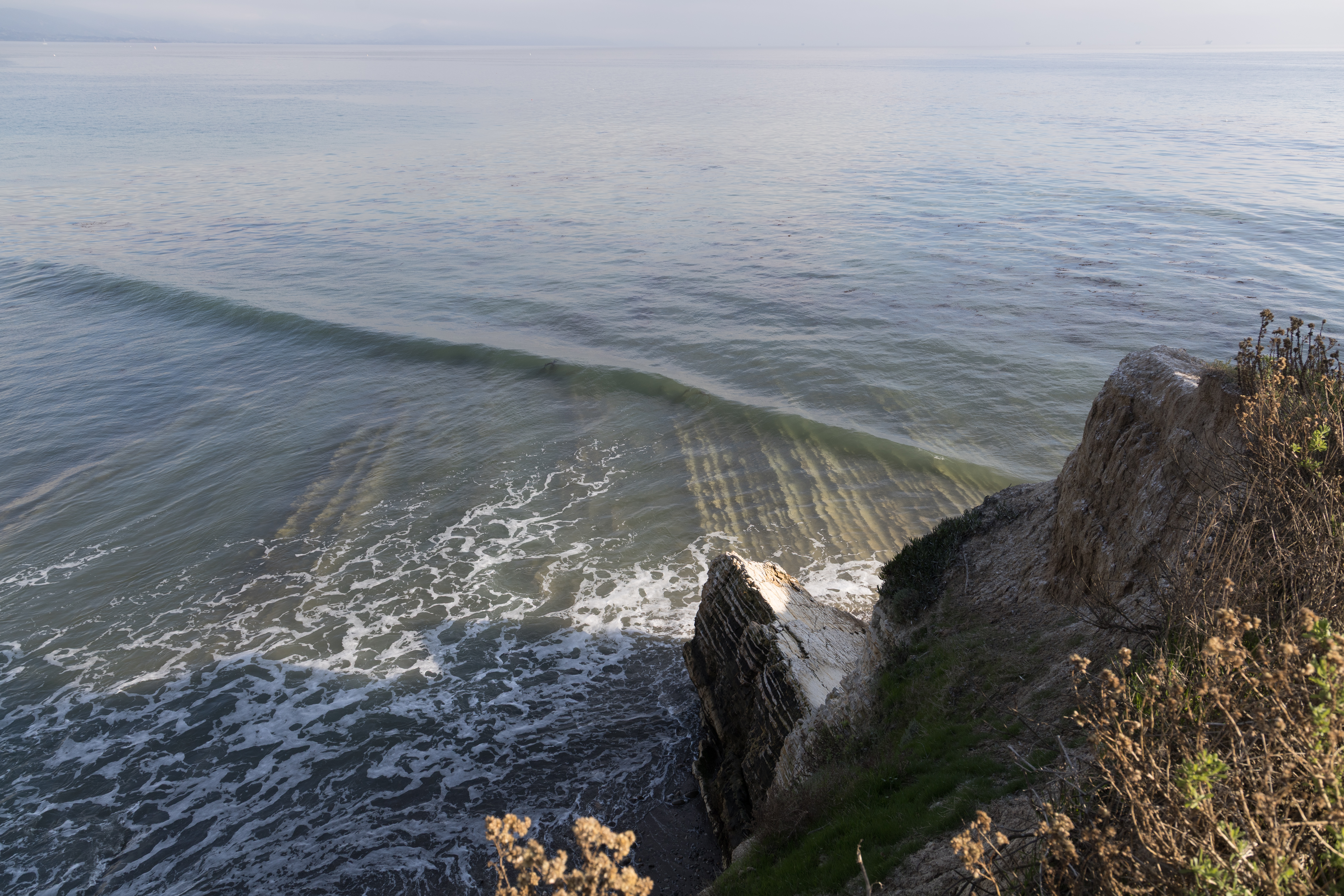
Santa Barbara Point and the Pacific, Located in Santa Barbara, California, US

Santa Barbara Point also known as Point Felipe is a cape in Santa Barbara County, California. It has an elevation of 3 feet (1 meter), located on Leadbetter Beach, in Santa Barbara, California.
