= William Fisher (media executive) =

- Born: William Fisher; Pittsburgh, Pennsylvania
- Education: Yale University BA; Columbia University MFA
- Occupation: Media Executive

William Fisher is an entrepreneur, media executive and TV producer who played a prominent role in the development of international pay television, particularly in Asia. He has owned multiple media properties and has worked as president of Playboy TV International, senior vice-president of HBO International, and vice-president of programming at STAR TV.

== Early life and education ==
William Fisher was born in Pittsburgh, Pennsylvania. He attended Yale University where he studied philosophy, graduating magna cum laude and with distinction in 1981. His senior thesis advisors were Fredric Jameson and Peter Demetz. At Yale he appeared in theater productions with such actors as Frank Langella, Stephen Collins, and classmate David Hyde Pierce. He went on to earn a Master of Fine Arts in film and television from Columbia University, where he was awarded the Film Division's scholarship of the Academy of Motion Picture Arts and Sciences. He received a Fulbright Fellowship to LMU Munich to pursue a research project on European Union subsidies and tax incentives for the film and television industries.

== International career ==
While living in Germany and France from 1983 to 1990, Fisher worked in film and television, writing on media topics for numerous publications including die tageszeitung, Cahiers du cinéma, The Daily Telegraph, The Independent, Foreign Policy, The Nation, The National Interest, New Literary History, The New Statesman, Sight & Sound, and The Wall Street Journal.

He moved to Hong Kong in 1991 to join the management team that launched Hutchison Whampoa's satellite television start-up, STAR TV. Serving as vice-president of programming, he was responsible for program acquisitions, co-productions and the joint venture for news with the British Broadcasting Corporation, BBC World Service Television (subsequently renamed BBC World. He remained at the company following STAR TV's acquisition by News Corporation, working closely with BSkyB and Fox Television to coordinate News Corporation's worldwide program acquisition strategy. STAR TV was subsequently acquired by the Walt Disney Company and is now known as Disney Star.

In 1995 he became senior vice-president of HBO International for Asia-Pacific. Based in Singapore, he was responsible for HBO's regional market entry strategy, with a particular focus on Greater China, India, and oversight of Home Box Office's investment in the regional pay TV unit HBO Asia.

== U.S. career ==
In 1999 Fisher returned to the U.S., where he was hired as president of a joint venture between private equity fund Hicks, Muse, Tate & Furst, the Cisneros Group, and Playboy Enterprises, overseeing international TV networks in 40 countries with 30 million subscribers, and launching new PayTV services in Benelux, France, Israel, New Zealand and Taiwan. Fisher left in 2001, after the company was acquired by the Argentine public company Claxson Interactive Group.

In 2002 he co-founded Collegia Capital, LLC, an investment company that advises on private equity and venture transactions in media and entertainment, with clients including Goldman Sachs private equity, hedge fund and distressed debt groups. In 2005, Collegia Capital acquired the Broadway Digital Archive, a 100-title library of films that appeared on US public television, featuring performances by Ingrid Bergman, Dustin Hoffman, Kevin Kline, Meryl Streep and others in plays by Chekov, O'Neill, Shakespeare, Tennessee Williams et al. Collegia Capital also produced the 104 episode syndicated series MovieStar. In 2006 Fisher was named CEO of Towers Productions, the Chicago-based Emmy-award-winning producer of broadcast and cable series and specials that include American Justice (278 episodes), Gangland (87 episodes), Inside 9/11, and Storm Stories (371 episodes).

In 2014 Fisher co-founded YuVue, LLC, an on-line platform that allows photographers and videographers to license their work to media outlets and brands while securing copyright and maintaining their control on social media channels. In 2021 he served as part of Americas Management Group, initiating and leading the sale and purchase of the largest PayTV operation in South America, Vrio Corp. The company owns the DIRECTV and SKY brands in South America, serving more than 10 million customers in 7 countries. As part of that transaction, his team developed Vrio's strategy to restructure the company, speed the deployment of OTT services through regional ISPs, and launch satellite internet service.

Fisher relocated to London in 2023. In 2025 he acquired the Berlin-based classical music audiovisual streaming platform IDAGIO GmbH, with 2.5m app downloads in 132 countries.
