= Willie Fisher (footballer) =

Scottish footballer

Personal information
- Full name: William Fisher
- Date of birth: 19 November 1873
- Place of birth: Stevenston, Scotland
- Date of death: 1910 (aged 36–37)
- Position: Inside forward

Senior career*
Years	Team	Apps	(Gls)
1894–1895	Dalry		
1895–1896	Kilmarnock	16	(9)
1896–1897	Derby County	11	(5)
1897–1898	Burton Swifts	23	(4)
1898–1900	Bristol Eastville Rovers		
1900–1901	Derby County	0	(0)
1901	Stevenston Thistle		
Total		50	(18)
- * Club domestic league appearances and goals

William Fisher (19 November 1873 – 1910) was a Scottish footballer who played in the Football League for Burton Swifts and Derby County.
