= William Edward Fitch =

American physician

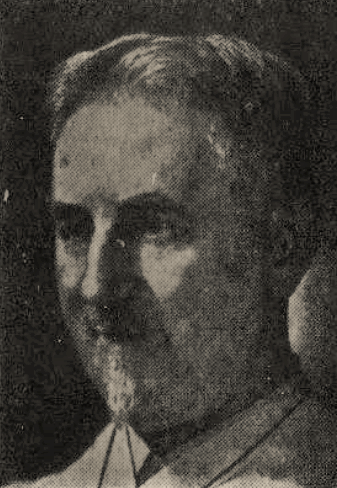
- Born: May 29, 1867; Burlington, North Carolina
- Died: September 12, 1949; Coral Gables, Florida
- Occupation(s): Physician, writer

William Edward Fitch (May 29, 1867 - September 12, 1949) was an American physician, surgeon and writer.

Fitch was born in Burlington, North Carolina. He was educated at the Union Academy in North Carolina and obtained his M.D. from the College of Physicians and Surgeons (Baltimore). In 1887, he moved to New York City. He founded the Georgia Journal of Medicine and Surgery. He sold this publication in 1904 and established Gaillard's Southern Medicine. He purchased the journal Pediatrics which he edited until 1911. He also managed the journal Gaillards with Pediatrics.

From 1907-1909, he was lecturer on principles of surgery at Fordham University. He worked as a gynaecologist at the outpatient clinic of Presbyterian Hospital (1907-1916) and physician at Vanderbilt Clinic. During the Spanish–American War, he was a surgeon for United States Marine Hospital Service. He was a major of the Medical Reserve Corps, U.S. Army in 1917. He was the chief nutritionist at the base hospital at Camp Jackson, S.C. He was honourably discharged in December, 1918.

He married Minnie Crump in 1892, they had three children. He died in Coral Gables, Florida.

== Publications ==
- Diagnosis and Treatment of Uterine and Menstrual Disorders (1903)
- The First Founders in America, With Facts to Prove that Sir Walter Raleigh's Lost Colony Was Not Lost (1913)
- Some Neglected History of North Carolina (1914)
- Dietotherapy (Volume 1, Volume 2, Volume 3, 1918)
- The New Pocket Medical Formulary (1921)
- Mineral Waters of the United States and American Spas (1927)
