= Rancho Cañada del Corral =

Land grant in California

Coordinates: 34.480°N 120.030°W

Rancho Cañada del Corral was a 8,876-acre (35.92 km^{2}) Mexican land grant in present-day Santa Barbara County, California given in 1841 by Governor pro tem Manuel Jimeno to José Dolores Ortega. The name means "valley corral". The grant extended along the Pacific coast from José Francisco Ortega's Rancho Nuestra Señora del Refugio past El Capitán State Beach to Rancho Dos Pueblos, and extended up into the Santa Ynez Mountains along Corral Canyon and El Capitán Canyon.

== History ==
José Dolores Ortega, grandson of José Francisco Ortega and majordomo at Mission Santa Barbara, was granted the two square league Rancho Cañada del Corral in 1841.

With the cession of California to the United States following the Mexican-American War, the 1848 Treaty of Guadalupe Hidalgo provided that the land grants would be honored. As required by the Land Act of 1851, a claim for Rancho Cañada del Corral was filed with the Public Land Commission in 1853, and the grant was patented to José Dolores Ortega in 1866.

José Dolores Ortega, and his family lived on Rancho Cañada del Corral, raising cattle and farming until they were forced to sell it in 1866, following years of ruinous droughts. Bruno Francisco Orella and his wife Mercedes Gonzalez y Guevara purchased Rancho Cañada del Corral in 1866, and the land became known as the Orella Ranch. Upon Bruno's death in 1901 his holdings were split among his 11 children. It was Fermín Orella who inherited what today is known as Orella Ranch. However Fermín Orella became a physician and lived in San Francisco. It was his nephew, Martin Erro, who came to farm Orella Ranch. Fermín had no children and gave Orella Ranch to Martin Erro, who continued to farm it until his death in 1960.

== Historic sites of the Rancho ==
- Orella Adobes. The two adobes serve as offices for the ExxonMobil Corporation.

== See also ==
- Ranchos of California
- List of Ranchos of California
