= Tajiguas, California =

The Gaviota Coast, with Tajiguas labeled near the top left

Tajiguas is a location on the Gaviota Coast in Santa Barbara County, California, which formerly was a Native American village of the Chumash people.

== Historical observations ==
The village was situated on the Pacific coast, at the site of the current Tajiguas Beach, 2 miles west of Refugio State Beach. Tajiguas ... probably means 'the basket' ... 42 houses on one side, 37 on the other ... at least 400 - 800 souls ... August 1769 ... Six years later ... completely abandoned. The settlement spanned two sides of a creek and was known to be inhabited by 400 - 800 or more people until 1769. Six years later, it was found abandoned, and the people are believed to have been forced by war to move slightly to the east to the coastal villages of Qasil and Shishuchi'i'.

== See also ==
- Chumash settlements
- Native American history of California
- Native Americans in California
