= Hollister Ranch =

Undeveloped coastal area on the Gaviota coast

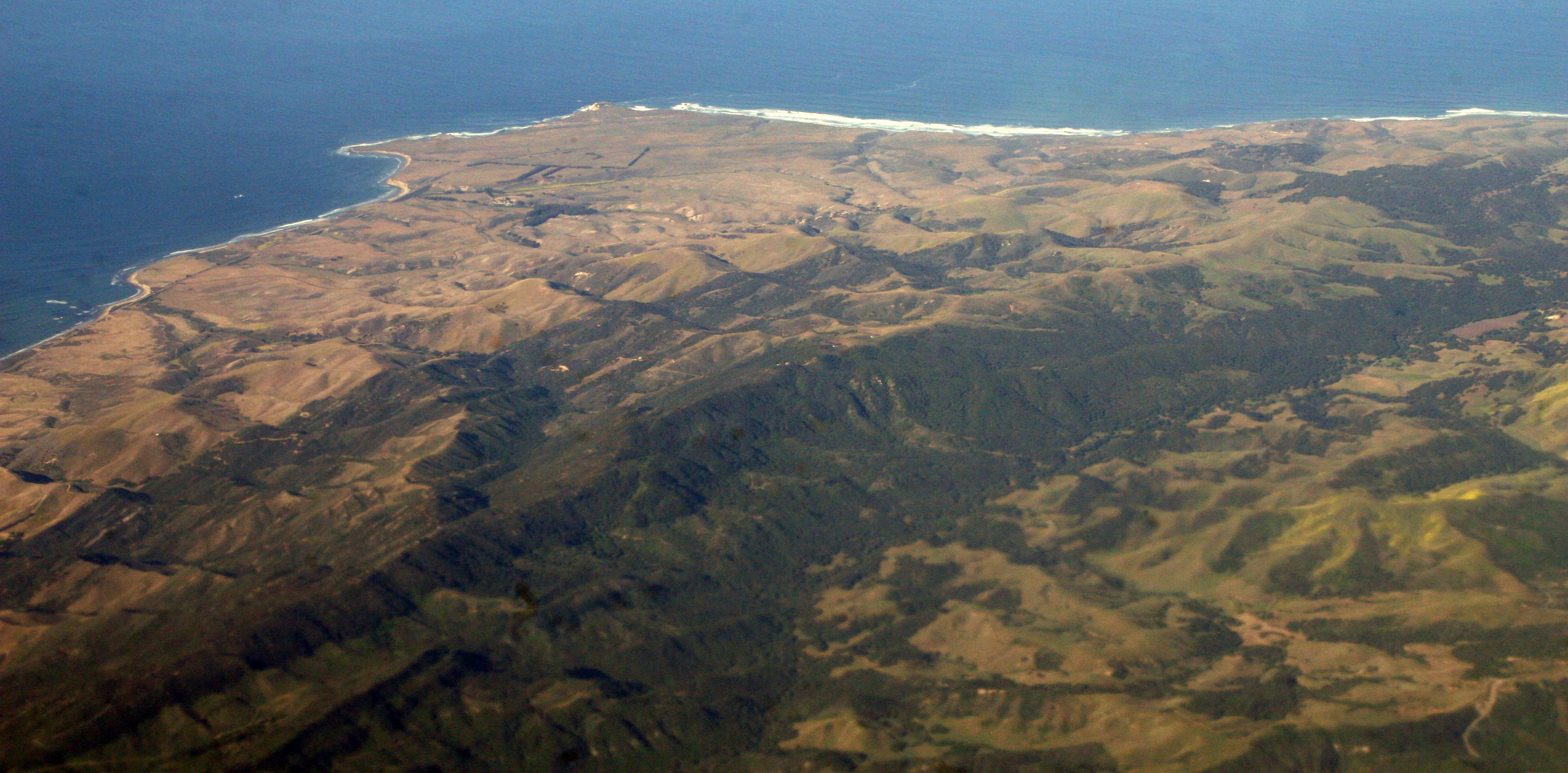
- Gaviota Coast and Point Conception, looking southwest. Much of the land in the lower half of the photo is on the old Hollister Ranch.
- Interactive map of Hollister Ranch
- Town/City: Gaviota Coast (Unincorporated); Santa Barbara County
- State: California
- Country: United States
- Coordinates: 34°28′47″N 120°19′31″W
- Owner: Private
- Area: 14,400 acres (58 km^{2})
- Produces: Cattle
- Status: Limited public access

Hollister Ranch is a 14,400-acre (58 km^{2}) gated residential community amidst a working cattle ranch on the Gaviota Coast in Santa Barbara County, California. The dramatic bluffs, isolated beaches and terraced grasslands are within the last undeveloped stretch of Southern California coastline. The fallow and fertile fields, mountains and valleys include some of the oldest known human settlements in the new world, the last native population of which was the Chumash. The Spanish Portolà expedition, the first European land explorers of California, traveled along its coast in 1769. It became part of the extensive Spanish land grant known as Rancho Nuestra Señora del Refugio, operated by the family of José Francisco Ortega from 1794.

The land was purchased by William Welles Hollister after the Civil War as part of a large acquisition, the center of which was at Glen Annie, Tecolotito canyon. Lying between Gaviota State Park and Point Conception, there have been conflicts over public access to coastal parts of the ranch for nearly 40 years. Beaches along the Ranch remain technically open to the public per California state law, but access is difficult because the ranch itself is protected private property.

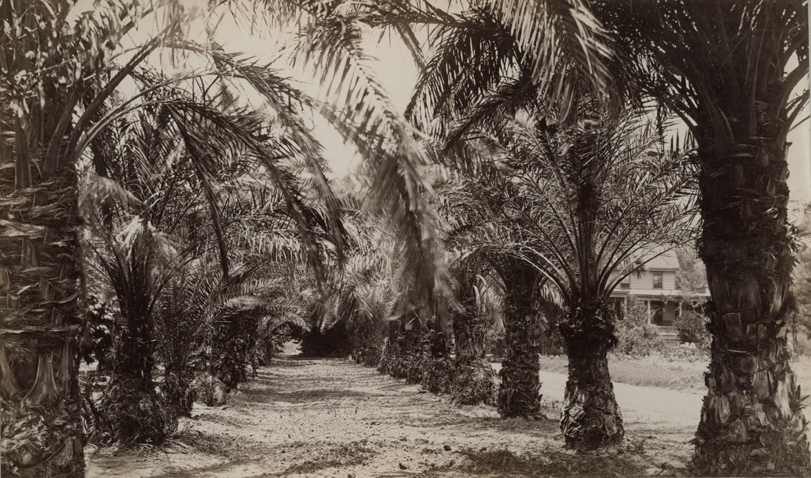
Date palms on Hollister's ranch circa 1885.

A cattle ranch since the days of the Ortegas, Hollister Ranch is the fourth largest cattle ranch in Santa Barbara County having shipped over 1,500,000 pounds (680,000 kg) of beef in the summer of 2005. As a result of the Hollister Ranch Owners' Association CC&Rs, Santa Barbara County zoning and California's Agricultural Preserve Program, when fully built out, over 98% of the property will continue to be devoted to cattle grazing. Other benefits to Hollister Ranch owners as a result of the cattle operation include a reduced fuel load in the event of range fire and the tax benefits that result from adherence to the restrictions imposed by the Uniform Rules of the Agricultural Preserve. Relative to the land prices for parcels in Hollister Ranch, however, the cattle ranching is probably uneconomic, and may continue largely for the sake of fuel load management for fire protection, Agricultural Preserve tax consequences and aesthetic considerations.

== Recreational use ==
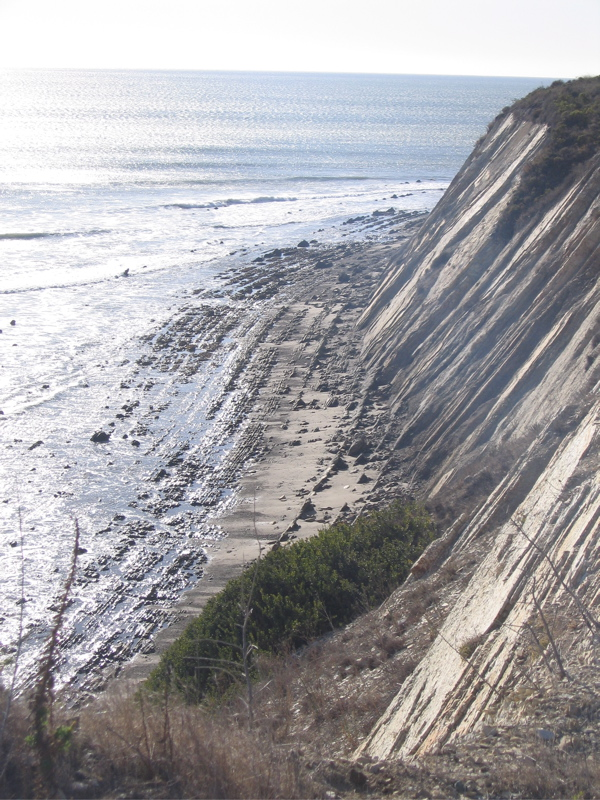
Razor Blades Beach, Hollister Ranch. Public access is legal but difficult.

The Hollister family, previous owners of the property, allowed some recreational use of the area. In the late 1950s, they granted a pass to the regional Sportsman Hunting Club, which later split into several smaller clubs, including the Santa Barbara Surf Club. During over a decade of regular use, the Santa Barbara Surf Club discovered and named many surfing spots off the coast of 8 miles (13 km) of beach, such as Razor Blades, Drake's, Little Drake's, Utah, Rights and Lefts, St. Augustine, Lefts and Rights, and on the adjacent Bixby Ranch land, Cojo Point, Perko's Point, and Government Point.

Recreational use of the beach and surrounding area is restricted to both the owners of the Hollister and Bixby ranches, and the public, who access the area by foot along the beach and by boat in the offshore waters. For decades the boat launch at Gaviota Pier allowed unfettered access to all Californians and visitors to the state tidelands all the way up to Point Conception. The launch was disabled around 2015. The restoration of the public access it provided, is currently held up by the California Coastal Commission. California law allows public access to all land below the mean high tide line, and many surfers, divers, and fisherman access the State waters by boating or walking in from Gaviota State Park on the east and Jalama Beach County Park on the west. The area is generally called "The Ranch" by surfers, divers, and fishermen.

== Development and environmental concerns ==
Many associated with the present Hollister Ranch describe themselves as responsible stewards of the land, ardently claiming to have worked out a successful formula balancing ecological preservation with residential development which functions within both a working commercial agricultural operation and a healthy natural habitat with a wide range of flora and fauna. The Hollister Ranch Association long term practice of a "formal beach driving program" has been described by the California Coastal Commission as “degrading [to] beach habitats and the natural coastline” and against the law. The ranch rules were amended to prohibit beach driving in 2018. The working cattle operation that has shipped as much as 1,000,000 pounds of beef in a good and rainy year has been criticized as primarily existing for tax-front purposes and as being subsidized by the owners. Regardless of the fact that cattle have continuously grazed at Hollister Ranch since the 1860s, some environmentalists note the potential impact such an operation could have on native flora and fauna. The ranch has also been criticized for precluding public access over private property to beaches, in alleged conflict with California state law. A sharp difference of opinion exists between Ranch owners, who describe the pristine nature of the Ranch after 45 years as an owners' association versus government officials and the public, some of whom view Ranch policies as exclusivist and disingenuous.

In 2004, the National Park Service abandoned a proposal to designate parts of the Gaviota Coast, including the seashore in front of Hollister Ranch, as a national seashore. Local landowners, especially those in Hollister Ranch, mounted a lobbying campaign to oppose the study. In addition to others in Santa Barbara County who, after learning of the proposed designation, hired advocates to oppose the National Seashore, the Hollister Ranch Owners' Association assessed its members to hire a former congressman to lobby against the National Seashore proposal.

For over twenty years Santa Barbara-area grade school children have been encouraged to participate (at no cost to the schools) in the Hollister Ranch Conservancy's "Tidepool Classroom" that preserves intertidal life forms not found elsewhere along the coast.

== See also ==
- List of beaches in California
