= Point Conception State Marine Reserve =

Marine protected area in Santa Barbara County, California

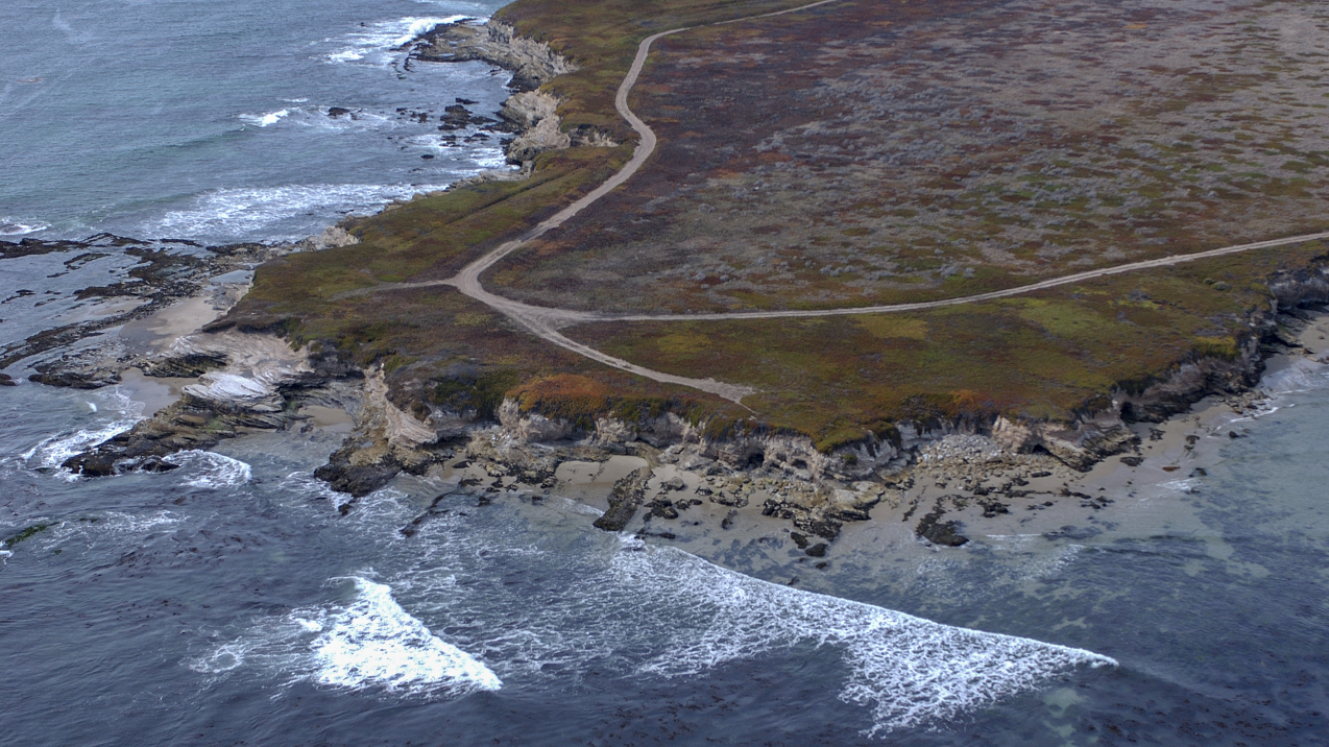
Government Point in the Point Conception State Marine Reserve.

Point Conception State Marine Reserve (SMR) is a marine protected area that extends off of Point Conception on the Gaviota Coast in Santa Barbara County, California. The SMR covers 22.51 square miles (58.3 km^{2}). The SMR prohibits the take of any living marine resources.

== History ==
Point Conception SMR is one of 36 marine protected areas adopted by the California Fish and Game Commission in December, 2010 during the third phase of the Marine Life Protection Act Initiative. The MLPAI is a collaborative public process to create a statewide network of protected areas along California’s coastline.

The south coast’s new marine protected areas were designed by local divers, fishermen, conservationists and scientists who comprised the South Coast Regional Stakeholder Group. Their job was to design a network of protected areas that would preserve sensitive sea life and habitats while enhancing recreation, study and education opportunities.

The south coast marine protected areas went into effect in January 2012.

== Geography and natural features ==
Point Conception SMR is a marine protected area that extends offshore of Point Conception in Santa Barbara County on California’s south coast. Point Conception is a peninsula that extends into the Pacific Ocean at the point where the Santa Barbara Channel meets the Pacific Ocean and is the site of the Point Conception Lighthouse.

Point Conception forms the boundary between central and southern California, and is sacred to the Chumash people.

The Point Conception SMR is bounded by the mean high tide line and straight lines connecting the following points in the order listed except where noted:

1. 34°27.00′N 120°28.28′W
2. 34°27.00′N 120°32.15′W thence southeastward along the three nautical mile offshore boundary to
3. 34°23.96′N 120°25.00′W and
4. 34°27.19′N 120°25.00′W.

== Habitat and wildlife ==
Point Conception SMR includes a major biogeographic boundary and is designed to protect key habitats including an upwelling zone, oil seeps, pinnacles, rocky reefs, kelp forests, deep rock, and harbor seal haulouts.

== Recreation ==
Wild and remote, Point Conception is bounded on the land side by private ranches and Vandenberg Air Force Base Access is almost exclusively restricted to seaward boat approach. Heavy local conditions include wind, surge and swell. The largest peacetime naval disaster occurred in 1923 off foggy and turbulent Point Conception when seven destroyers failed to negotiate the Point and were lost.

The Point Conception SMR abuts the remotest and most pristine end of the Gaviota Coast, one of the last undeveloped stretches of coastline in the U.S. Dense kelp forest and a mix of cold and warm water marine species will delight the advanced diver. Numerous shipwrecks, many uncharted, also occur here. Remote surfing spots, low-tide beach hiking (beware private property including patrolled military area) and viewing of southern sea otters are also available. Longer range SCUBA dive operations may be available.

Jalama Beach County Park is the nearest coastal access to the north with Gaviota State Park the closest coastal access to the south.

Lompoc is the nearest town and has numerous eateries and modest outfitting services.

Point Conception SMR prohibits the take of all living marine resources. California’s marine protected areas encourage recreational and educational uses of the ocean. Activities such as kayaking, diving, snorkeling, and swimming are allowed.

== Scientific monitoring ==
As specified by the Marine Life Protection Act, select marine protected areas along California’s south coast are being monitored by scientists to track their effectiveness and learn more about ocean health. Similar studies in marine protected areas located off of the Santa Barbara Channel Islands have already detected gradual improvements in fish size and number.
