= Orella Adobes =

18th-19th century adobe residences in California

General information
- Architectural style: Adobe
- Location: Cañada del Corral, Santa Barbara County, California
- Coordinates: 34°27′56″N 120°02′42″W
- Completed: c. 1798-1841

The Orella Adobes at Cañada del Corral on the Gaviota Coast about 20 miles (32 km) west of Santa Barbara are Santa Barbara County landmarks. The adobes may trace back to the late 18th century, as a tile was found during a remodel in the 1930s imprinted with the year "1798".

== Background ==
The property was originally part of Rancho Cañada del Corral. While owned by Ortega descendants, it was a frequent center of social events and played host to numerous travelers, including John C. Frémont in 1847. Ownership passed to Bruno Orella and his wife Mercedes Gonzalez y Guevara in 1866.

Bruno Orella, was born in the Basque country in Spain in 1830, and came to California at the time of the Gold Rush. He married Mercedes Gonzalez y Ladron de Guevara. The couple established a prosperous farming/mercantile family with extensive holdings throughout the Santa Barbara/Ventura region. The site of Orella's town-home (known as the "Janssens-Orella-Birk Building") on the State street, main street of Santa Barbara, is on the National Register of Historic Places. The Orellas were patrons of the local Catholic churches and religious orders. All sons of the family attended Santa Clara College and to this day there is an Orella Prize given at that university to the student with highest grades in the sciences.

When the Orellas purchased the adobes, they became their country residence. One of the buildings served as schoolhouse to their children, and a tutor was hired to live on the ranch. Bruno's daughter, Elena Orella Covarrubias, inherited the adobes and remodeled them in the 1930s in Spanish Revival style. Oil was found on her land in August 1929, with the drilling of the "Erburu No. 1" well by General Petroleum Corporation, in the Vaqueros Formation at a depth of 1,446 feet (441 m). The "El Capitan Oil Field" became one of the richest in the state; production at the field peaked in 1946. It was part of Bruno's large landholdings in the region and remained in the hands of his descendants until the property was sold to Exxon Mobil Corporation in 1971.

== Contemporary history ==
On August 17, 1993, the Santa Barbara County Board of Supervisors declared County Landmark status for the Orella Adobes.

On January 20, 2017, a flash flood inundated Cañada del Corral and damaged the historic adobes. A local resident reported that one of the adobes appeared to have fallen into the river.

In 2021, the historic Covarrubias Barn located across the creek from the adobes was destroyed during the Alisal Fire.

== See also ==
- List of the oldest buildings in California
