= Chumash Heritage National Marine Sanctuary =

Marine sanctuary in the Pacific Coast of Southern California

- IUCN category V (protected landscape/seascape)
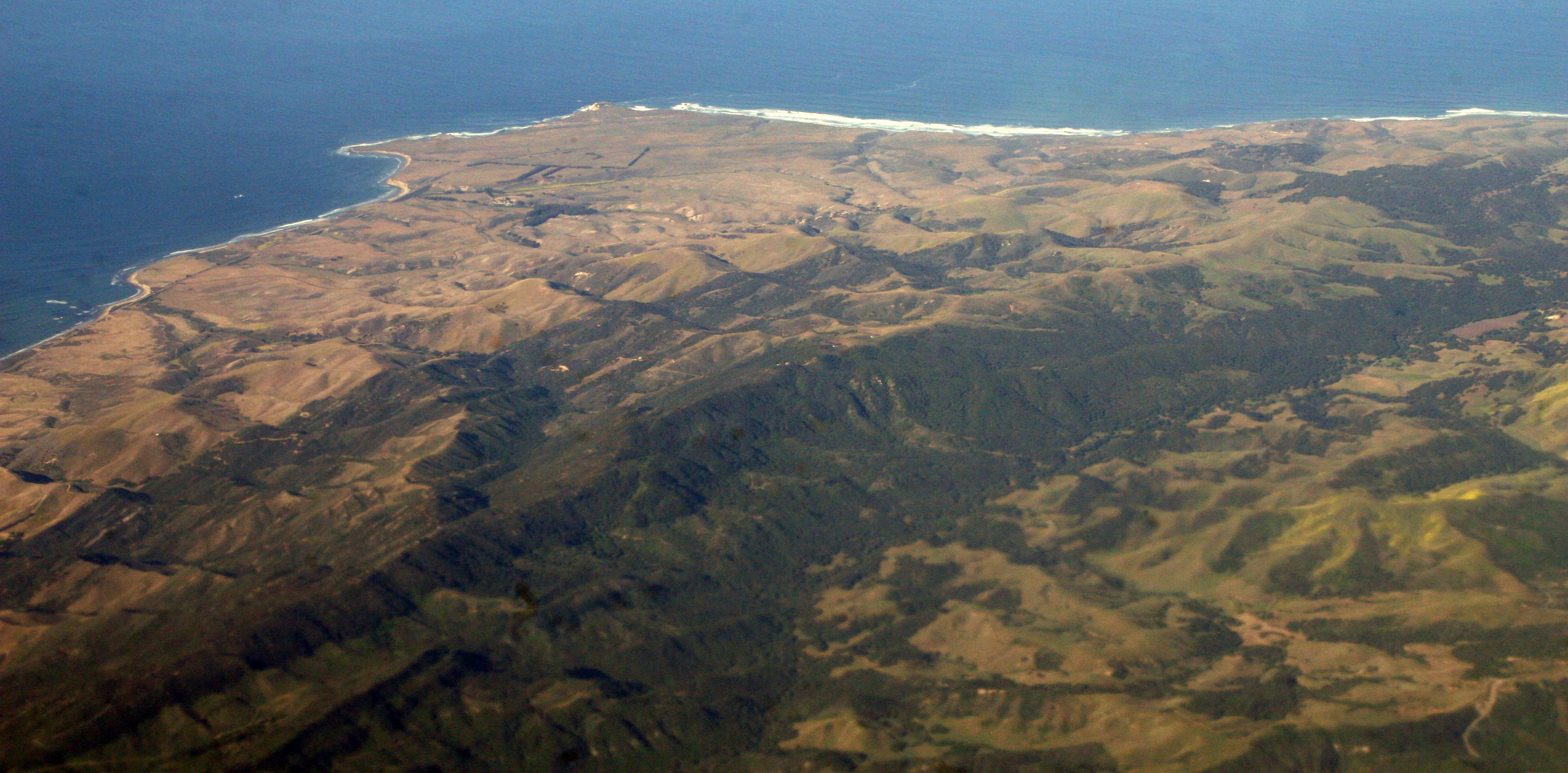
- Point Conception and the Gaviota Coast
- Interactive map of Chumash Heritage National Marine Sanctuary
- Location: Pacific Ocean off Central Coast of California
- Coordinates: 34°29′N 121°01′W
- Area: 4,543 sq mi (11,770 km^{2})
- Established: October 11, 2024; 20 months ago
- Governing body: NOAA Office of National Marine Sanctuaries
- Website: sanctuaries.noaa.gov/chumash-heritage/

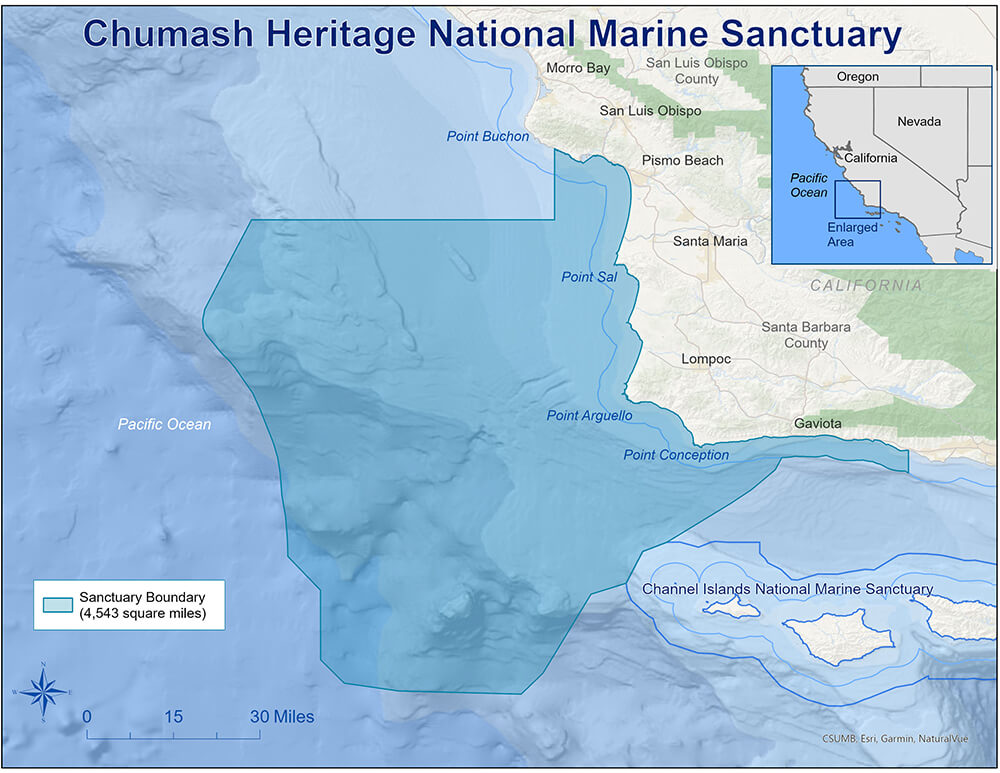
Map of the Chumash Heritage National Marine Sanctuary

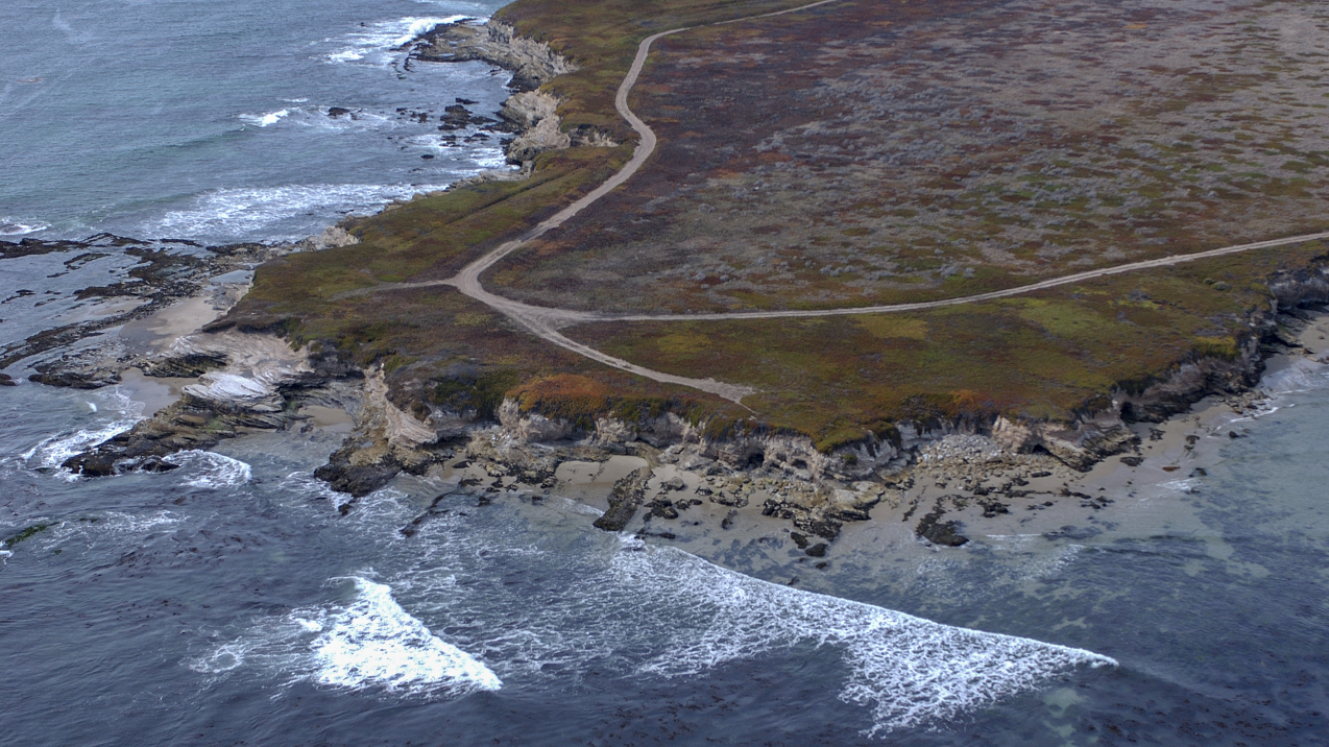
Government Point lies on the sanctuary's coast.

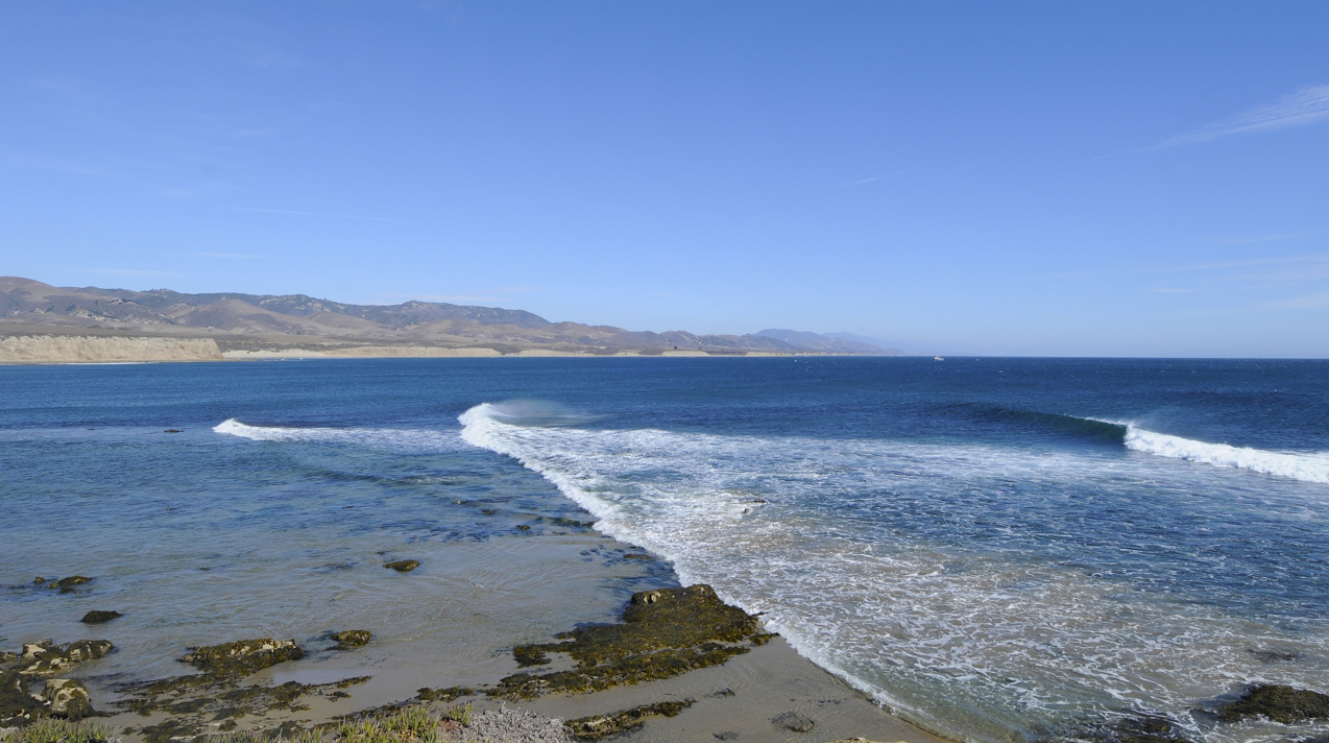
Cape Cojo Anchorage in the Chumash Heritage National Marine Sanctuary.

The Chumash Heritage National Marine Sanctuary is a National Marine Sanctuary in the Pacific Ocean off the coast of San Luis Obispo and Santa Barbara counties on the Central Coast of California. It was designated on October 11, 2024, by the National Oceanic and Atmospheric Administration (NOAA). It is the first marine sanctuary to have been proposed by an Indigenous group. It protects nationally significant natural, cultural, and historical resources in Central California's coastal and ocean waters and offers opportunities for research, community engagement, and education and outreach activities.

The Chumash Heritage National Marine Sanctuary was the 17th national marine sanctuary and sixth on the United States West Coast. It was designated only five weeks after the designation of the Lake Ontario National Marine Sanctuary on September 6, 2024, which in turn was the first since the Wisconsin Shipwreck Coast National Marine Sanctuary in 2021.

== Geography ==
The Chumash Heritage National Marine Sanctuary encompasses approximately 4,543 square miles (3,431 sq nmi; 11,766 km^{2}) of ocean water and coastline, making it the third-largest sanctuary in the National Marine Sanctuary program. It lies in the Pacific Ocean off the Central Coast of California. It is located along the coast of San Luis Obispo and Santa Barbara counties, stretching for 116 miles (187 km) from just south of the Diablo Canyon Power Plant in San Luis Obispo County southward to Naples Reef on the Gaviota Coast in Santa Barbara County. Cities directly along the coastline facing the sanctuary include Avila Beach, Arroyo Grande, Goleta, Grover Beach, and Pismo Beach, while Santa Barbara is on the coast just south of the sanctuary and Guadalupe, Lompoc, San Luis Obispo, and Santa Maria lie inland near the sanctuary.

The sanctuary is adjacent to the Monterey Bay National Marine Sanctuary to its north and the Channel Islands National Marine Sanctuary to its south. It stretches nearly 60 miles (52 nmi; 97 km) from shore and its waters reach a maximum depth of 11,580 feet (3,530 m). Undersea features within its boundaries include Arguello Canyon, Rodriguez Seamount, and a portion of the Santa Lucia Bank.

== Flora and fauna ==
A high level of biodiversity exists in the waters of the Chumash Heritage National Marine Sanctuary, where productive ecosystems support a wide variety of marine life, including sensitive species and habitats. Ecological habitats found in the sanctuary include extensive kelp forests, rocky reefs, deep-water coral gardens, sandy beaches, coastal dunes, and wetlands, the latter serving as nursery grounds for numerous commercial fish species and important habitats for many threatened and endangered species.

The meeting of warm and cold ocean waters in the sanctuary, upwellings from the California Current, geologic features like Rodriguez Seamount and Santa Lucia Bank, and important biogeographic ecotones in the sanctuary create ecological habitats that support biological productivity. Seabirds, marine mammals, sea turtles, fishes, marine invertebrates, marine plants, and marine algae abound. Habitats, physical features, or prey attract many threatened or endangered species — such as black abalone, blue whales, leatherback sea turtles, and snowy plovers — to the sanctuary's waters. Over 400 species of fish, four species of sea turtle, six species of pinniped, and 33 species of cetacean are found in the sanctuary's waters.

Sea life in the Chumash Heritage National Marine Sanctuary

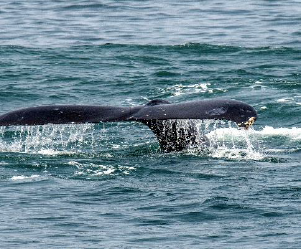
A humpback whale swims through sanctuary waters

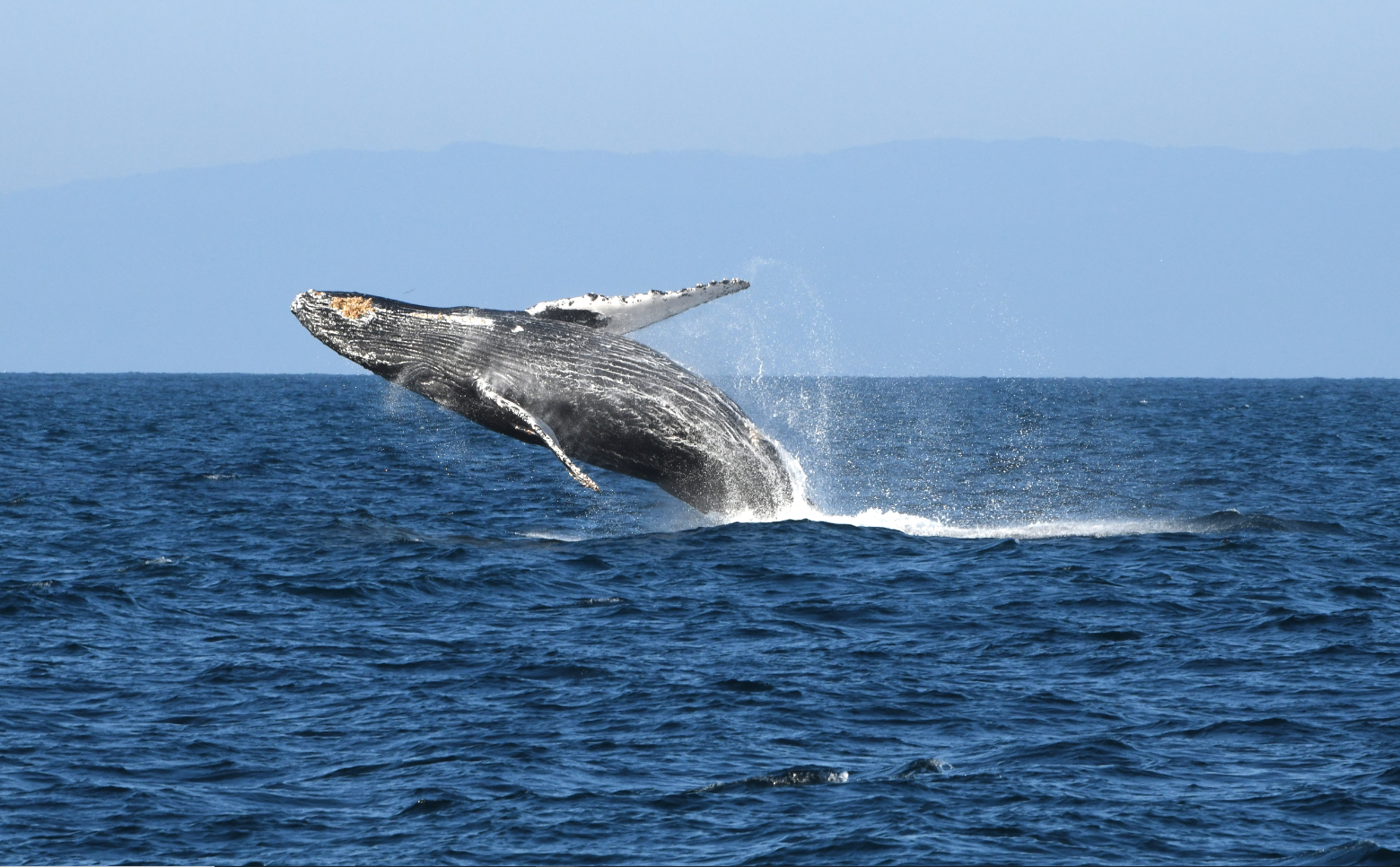
A humpback whale breaches in the sanctuary

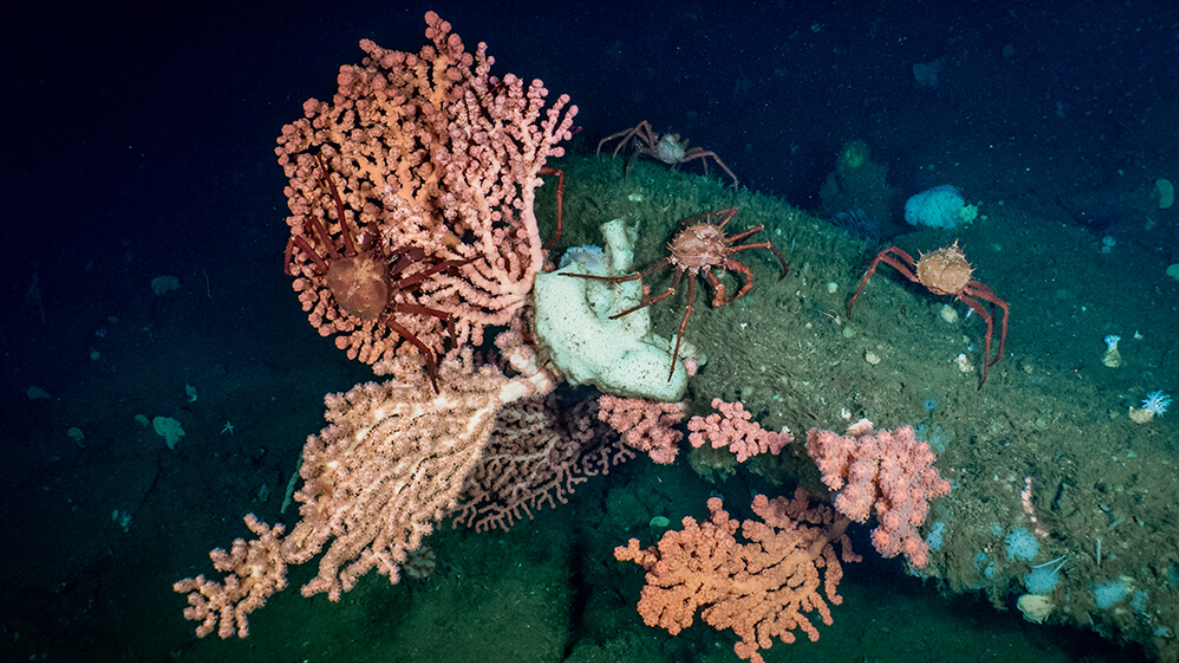
A bubblegum coral (Paragorgia arborea) on Santa Lucia Bank

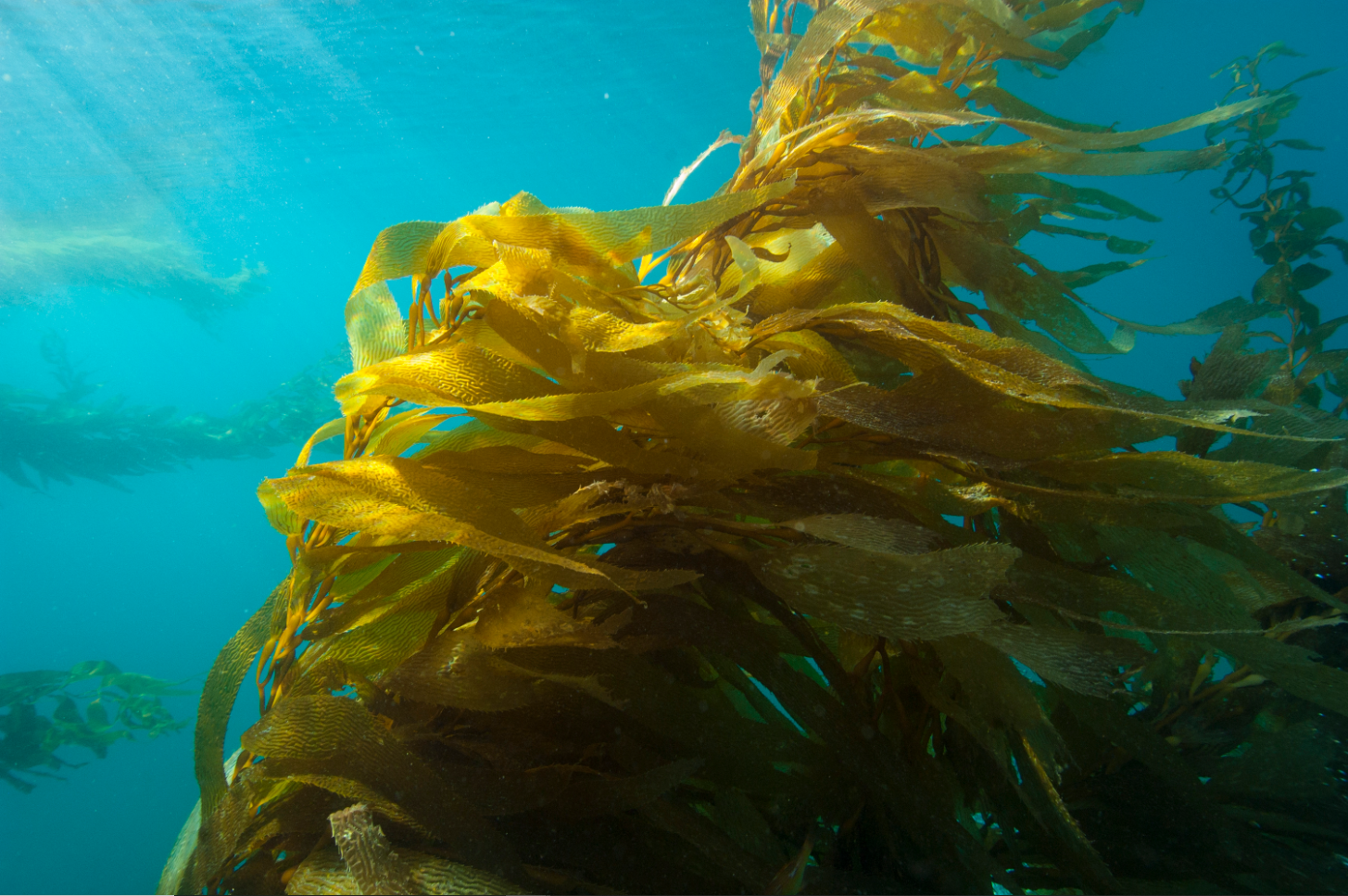
A kelp forest at Cojo Anchorage near Point Conception

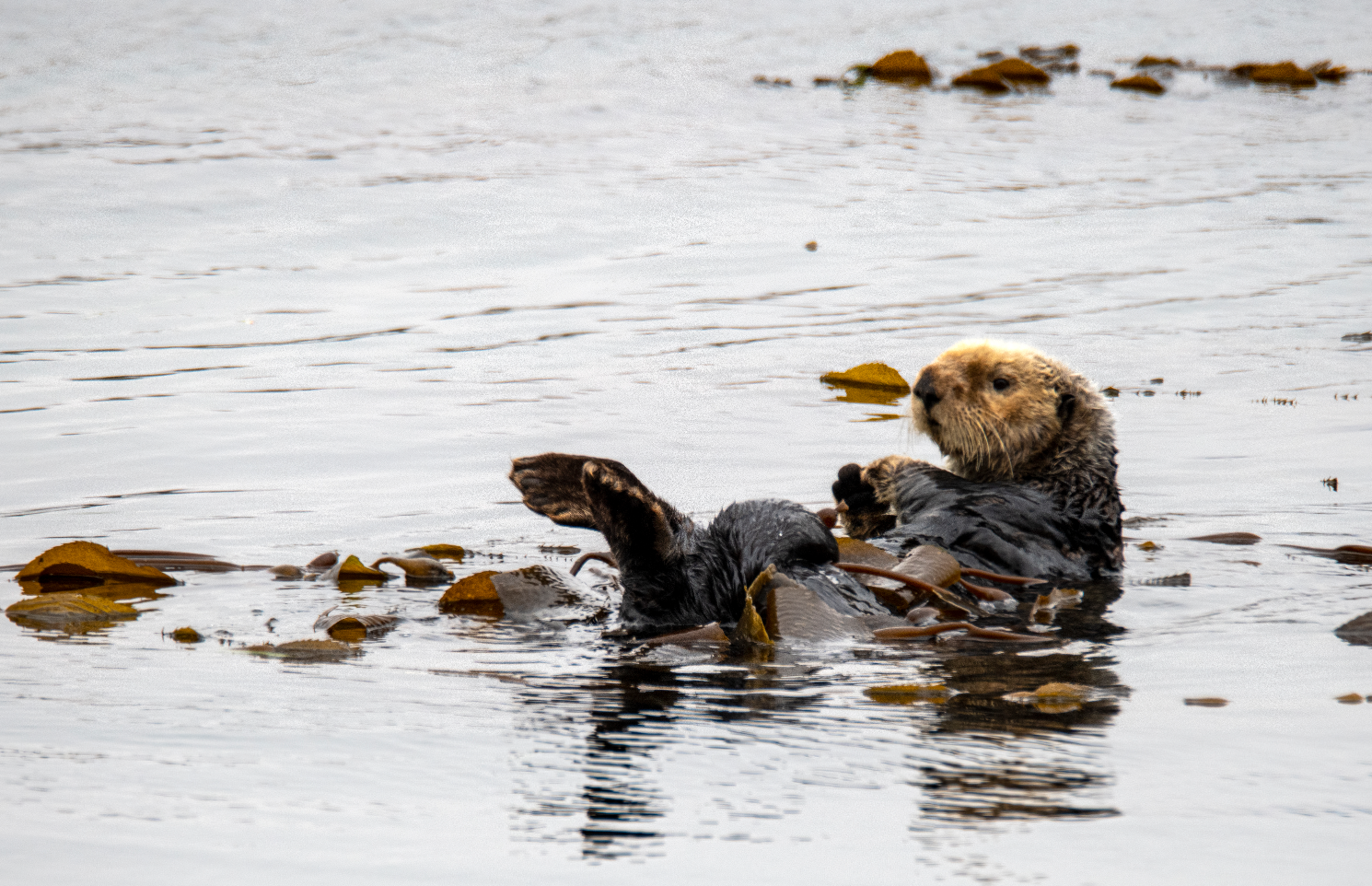
A sea otter in a kelp forest

== Indigenous culture and heritage ==
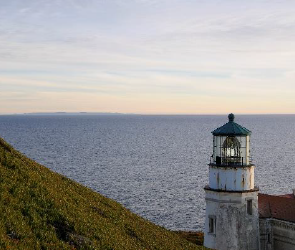
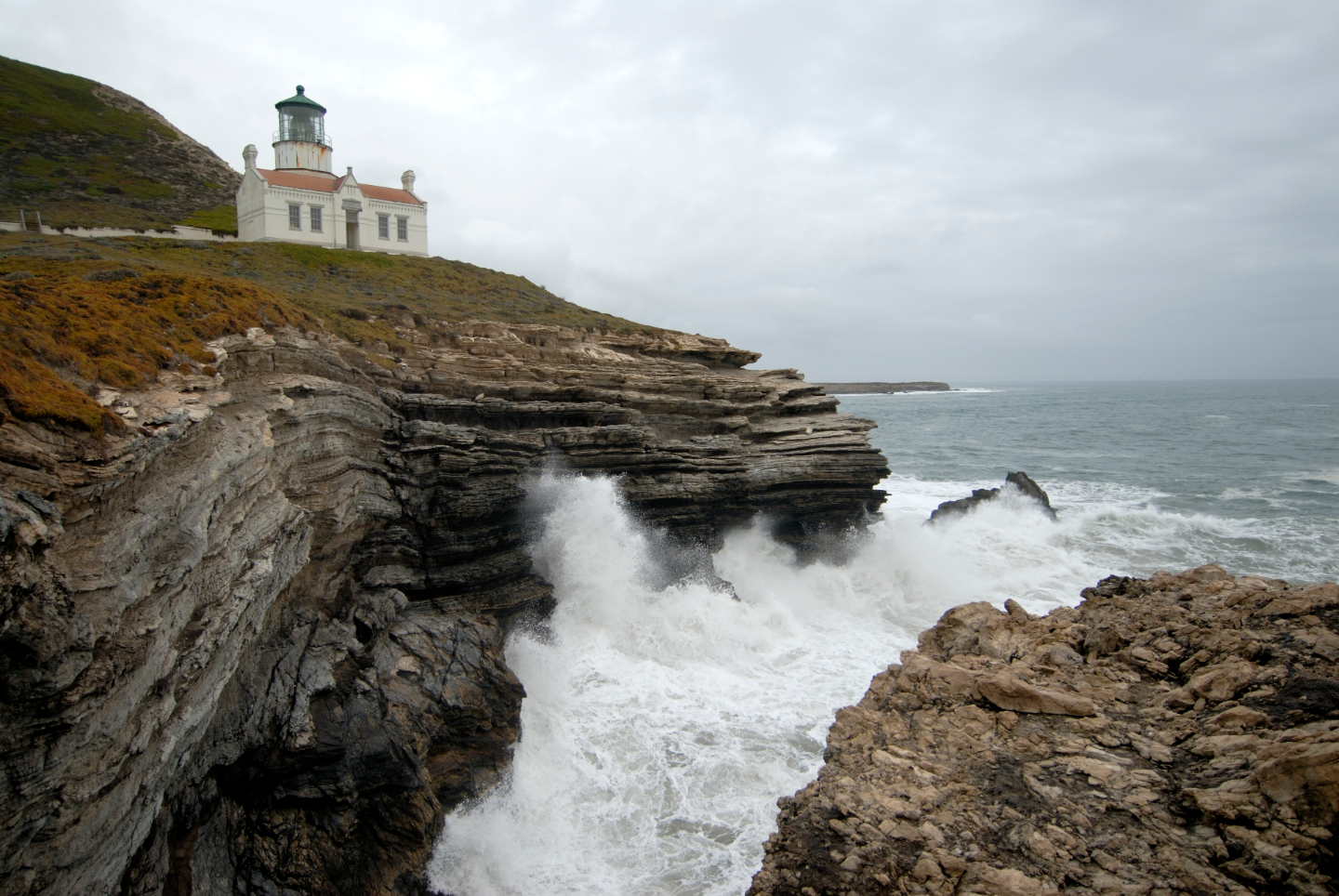
Point Conception Light, a historically significant lighthouse on Point Conception, a place of deep cultural significance to the Chumash people.

The Chumash Heritage National Marine Sanctuary's coast and waters hold deep cultural, spiritual, and historical significance for both the Chumash people and the Salinan people to their north. Coastal, ocean-going communities of Native Americans have existed in the area since prehistoric times, with evidence of settlements dating back to at least ca. 8,000 B.C. During the Last Glacial Period, such communities existed on land that became submerged by rising sea levels as the glaciers retreated. The sanctuary's waters thus cover the paleoshorelines and ancestral lands which now lie on the seabed. The creation of the sanctuary protects ancient village locations that probably lie along the submerged paleoshorelines.

== Maritime history and heritage ==
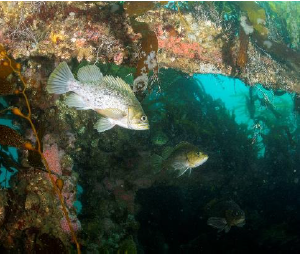
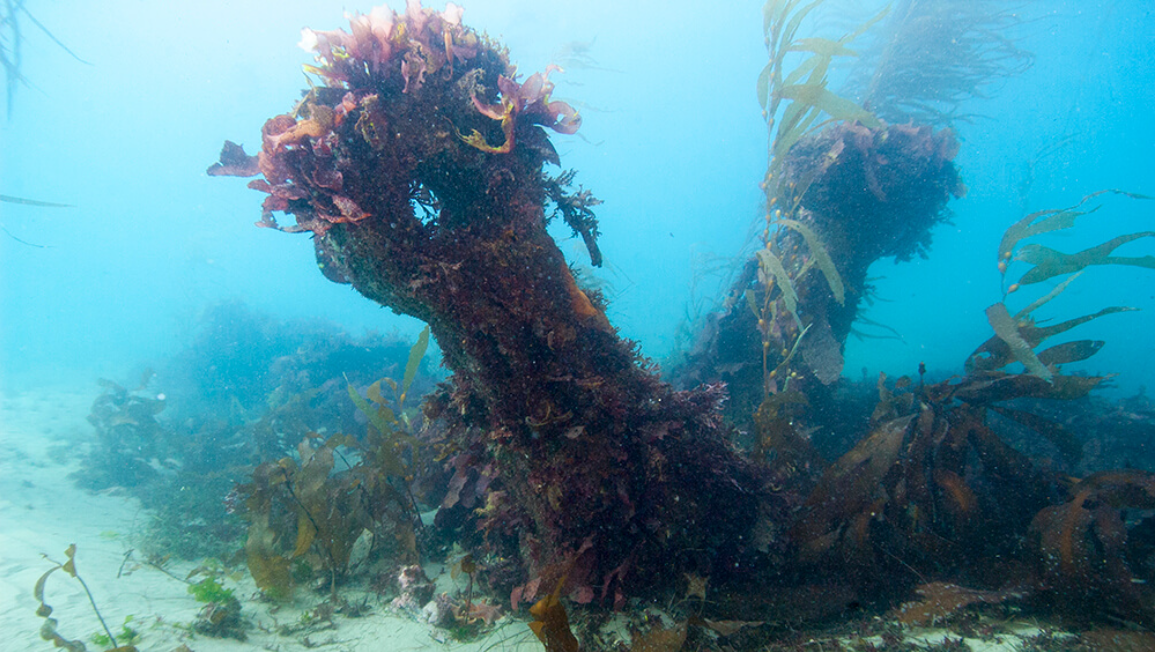
Shipwrecks in Cojo Anchorage. LEFT: The British four-masted sailing ship Gosford sank on November 24,1893. RIGHT: The wrecking steamer San Pedro sank on November 5, 1894, while salvaging Gosford.

Coastal schooners and other small sailing ships transported cargo such as lumber and produce along the coast of North America through the waters of what is now the Chumash Heritage National Marine Sanctuary during the entire combined history of control of the area by the Spanish Empire, Mexico, and the United States. Over 200 documented shipwrecks lie in the sanctuary — both along and off the coast — and span this entire history. Wrecked aircraft also lie on the seabed in the sanctuary.

The oldest ocean-going steamship lost in the sanctuary's waters was the wooden sidewheel paddle steamer SS Yankee Blade, wrecked off Point Arguello in 1854 while carrying passengers, cargo, and gold from San Francisco, California, to Panama, during the California Gold Rush in one of the worst maritime disasters in the history of the United States West Coast. The wreck of the United States Coast Guard cutter McCulloch also lies within the sanctuary. Both wrecks are listed on the National Register of Historic Places.

== Economic activities ==
Productive fishing grounds lie within the Chumash Heritage National Marine Sanctuary. Its waters also are used for economically important recreational activities and tourism.

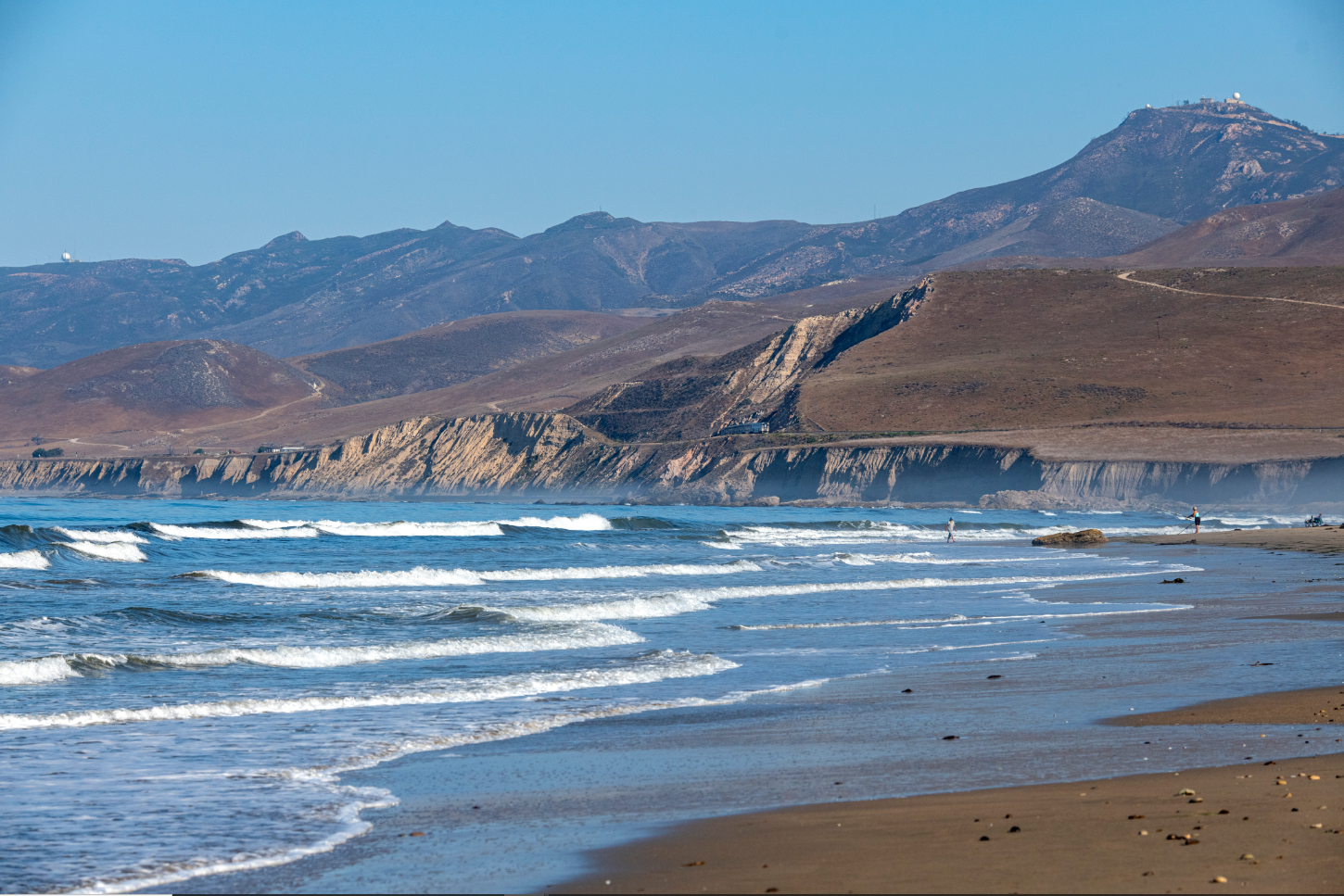
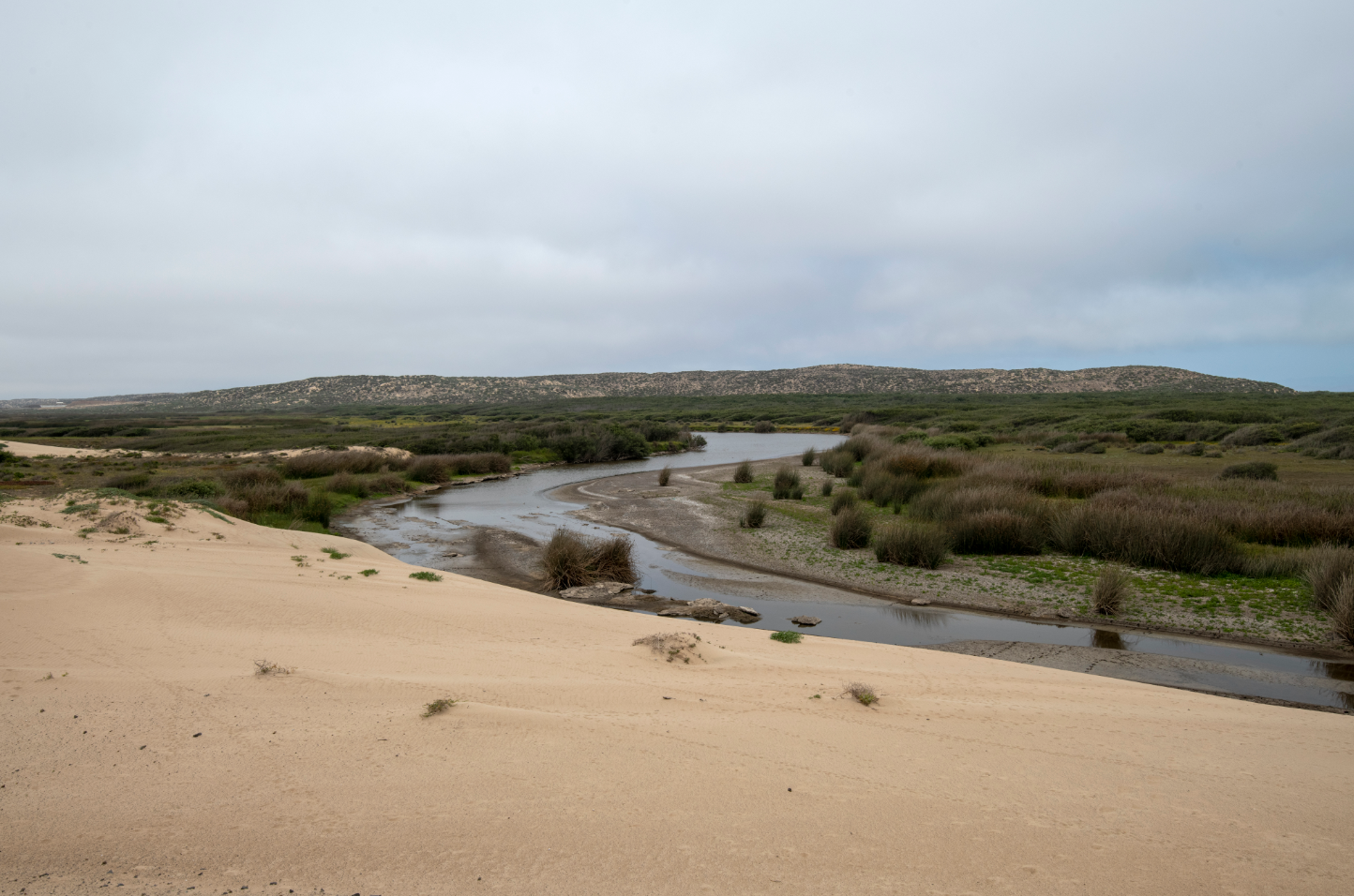
Recreational sites. LEFT: Jalama Beach is used for surfing, sport fishing, and beachcombing. RIGHT: Once a place where the Chumash people gathered seafood, the Santa Maria River estuary in the Rancho Guadalupe Dunes Preserve has become a seabird-watching site.

== Designation history ==
Representatives of the Chumash people began to advocate protection of the coastal and ocean waters of the Central California coast in the 1980s. By the mid-2010s, a concerted effort by Indigenous peoples, tribal governments, community leaders and organizations, businesses, California state and local officials, and members of the United States Congress to establish the sanctuary was underway. In July 2015, the Northern Chumash Tribal Council submitted a sanctuary nomination on behalf of a broad consortium of stakeholders and interested parties, the first time an Indigenous tribe had nominated a national marine sanctuary for designation.

In November 2021, NOAA's Office of National Marine Sanctuaries issued a notice of intent to begin the designation process for the sanctuary, proposing an area of about 7,600 square miles (19,700 km^{2}) of the Pacific Ocean and a shoreline that extended for 156 miles (251 km), including coastal landmarks significant to the Chumash people's heritage from Gaviota Creek north to Santa Rosa Creek near the town of Cambria in San Luis Obispo County. An 83-day scoping period followed from November 2021 to January 2022. During this period, NOAA solicited public comments by hosting three virtual public meetings to discuss the proposed sanctuary. These comments informed NOAA's initial development of draft designation documents, which included consideration of the potential impacts and regulations related to various alternatives for the boundaries of the sanctuary, as well as the contents of a draft management plan for the sanctuary.

On August 25, 2023, NOAA released its proposal for the Chumash Heritage National Marine Sanctuary, publishing a notice of availability of a draft environmental impact statement, proposed rule, and draft management plan for the sanctuary. The documents called for the protection of a 5,617-square-mile (4,242 sq nmi; 14,548 km^{2}) area. A two-month public comment period followed, and when it concluded on October 25, 2023, NOAA had received 110,000 public comments. After considering the public comments, consulting with other United States Government agencies, the government of the Santa Ynez Band of Chumash Indians, and other interested Indigenous groups and tribes, and taking into account the nature conservation and renewable energy goals of the U.S. and California state governments, NOAA set its boundaries so that it did not include offshore areas where wind turbines or wind power transmission cables were expected to be installed. The proposed sanctuary's size was reduced to 4,543 square miles (11,766 km^{2}), although NOAA noted that it would consider expansion of the sanctuary once the location of transmission cables had been approved.

In September 6, 2024, NOAA released its final environmental impact statement, which outlined the results of an environmental impact assessment of the proposed sanctuary evaluating its expected environmental, social, and economic effects. After a waiting period of 30 days required by the National Environmental Policy Act of 1969, NOAA published the final rule, final management plan, and record of decision for designation of the sanctuary on October 11, 2024. In accordance with the National Marine Sanctuaries Act, a period of 45 days of continuous congressional followed for potential congressional review and for a final review opportunity by the Governor of California.

== Administration ==
The Office of National Marine Sanctuaries of the National Ocean Service, an element of NOAA, administers the Chumash Heritage National Marine Sanctuary. NOAA employs a philosophy of "indigenous collaborative co-stewardship" to ensure that its stewardship of the sanctuary respects and honors the traditions, culture, and desires of indigenous peoples, that NOAA and indigenous tribes make collaborative or cooperative agreements regarding their shared interests in the sanctuary, that interested members of indigenous tribes can make meaningful contributions to the sanctuary's management, and that NOAA can incorporate their technical expertise, knowledge, experience, and perspectives into its management of the sanctuary. Accordingly, the Santa Ynez Band of Chumash Mission Indians serves as co-steward of the sanctuary.

To achieve its stewardship goals, NOAA uses a number of councils and panels to aid it in managing the sanctuary. These include:

- An Intergovernmental Policy Council made up of representatives of NOAA, the government of California, and federally recognized Native American tribes.
- A Sanctuary Advisory Council composed of 15 voting members and 15 alternates who represent community interests, including local user groups; Indigenous knowledge and tribal government; conservation and public interest groups; scientific and educational expertise; representatives of United States Government, California state government, or local government agencies with expertise relevant to the management of marine resources and activities within the sanctuary; and interested members of the public.
- An Indigenous Cultures Advisory Panel.
