= El Capitán State Beach =

State park in California, United States

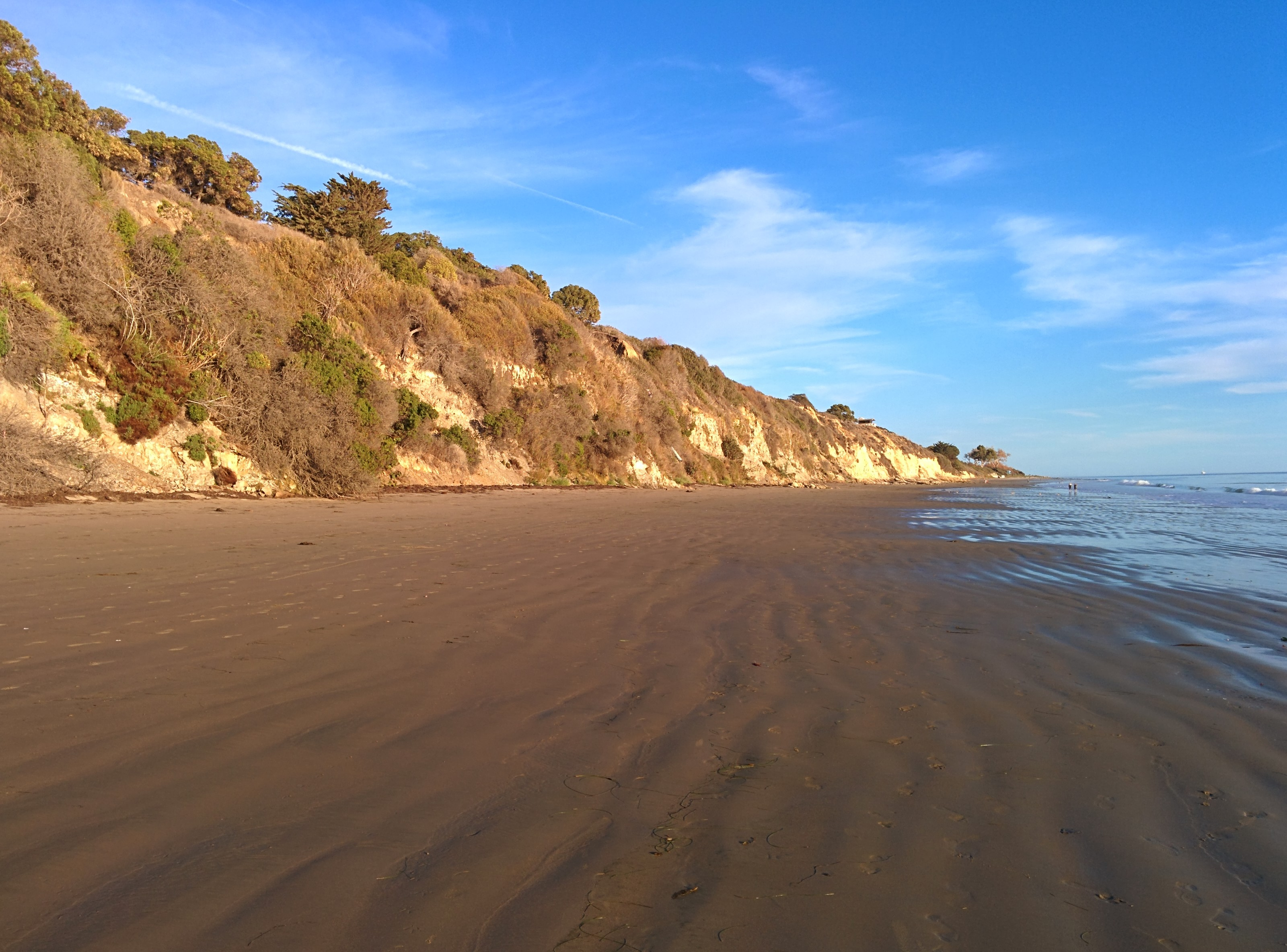
- El Capitán State Beach looking east

- Location within California Location within the United States
- Location: Santa Barbara County, California
- Nearest city: Goleta, California
- Coordinates: 34°27′38″N 120°1′27″W
- Area: 2,634 acres (10.66 km^{2})
- Established: 1953
- Governing body: California Department of Parks and Recreation

El Capitán State Beach is a protected beach in the state park system of California. The most easterly of three state parks along the Gaviota Coast, it is located about 20 miles (32 km) west of downtown Santa Barbara, in Santa Barbara County. The beach is named for José Francisco Ortega, who retired from the Spanish Army in 1795 with the rank of captain and received the Rancho Nuestra Señora del Refugio as a land grant.

== Features ==
El Capitán has a day-use beach as well as a campground with 131 sites (6 of which are RV only) and 5 group sites. There are tide pools on the beach and sycamore and oak trees in the campground area. Monarch butterflies congregate at El Capitán in autumn to overwinter.

== History ==
The parkland was acquired between 1953 and 1967 and the State Parks Commission classified El Capitán State Beach in June of 1962. In 2002 the state acquired 2,500 acres (1,000 ha) at a discount from the owners of El Capitan Ranch. The property rises above the existing park through oak woodlands and chaparral to the ridgelines of the Santa Ynez Mountains. The Refugio oil spill occurred just north of nearby Refugio State Beach in 2015 when a pipeline carrying crude oil ruptured. The spill went into a culvert that ran under US 101 and into the ocean. The spill spread over 7 miles (11 km) of coastline, including El Capitán and Refugio state beaches. Both parks were closed for much of the summer during the clean-up, including during the typically busy Memorial Day weekend. The pipeline which caused the disaster is no longer in service.

In 2016, the park's water system was destroyed when the Sherpa Fire swept through a canyon near the main campgrounds. The park had already closed due to the smoke and fire danger. In 2021, a project removed barriers for steelhead trout swimming upstream to reproduce by rebuilding the entrance bridge. In January 2023, the park water system and entrance road experienced catastrophic damage from significant rainfall, prompting evacuations of park staff and closing the park for repairs. Park damages from the storm totaled $11.9 million, the third most expensive damage caused by the storm system to California State Parks.

An update to the 1979 General Plan which included an inventory of wildlife, historic, and archeological assets and an outline of issues and concerns was started in 2024. Gaviota State Park and Refugio State beach will be included in the recommendations for modernizing the infrastructure, adapting to climate change impacts and providing sustainable recreational opportunities.

== Gallery ==
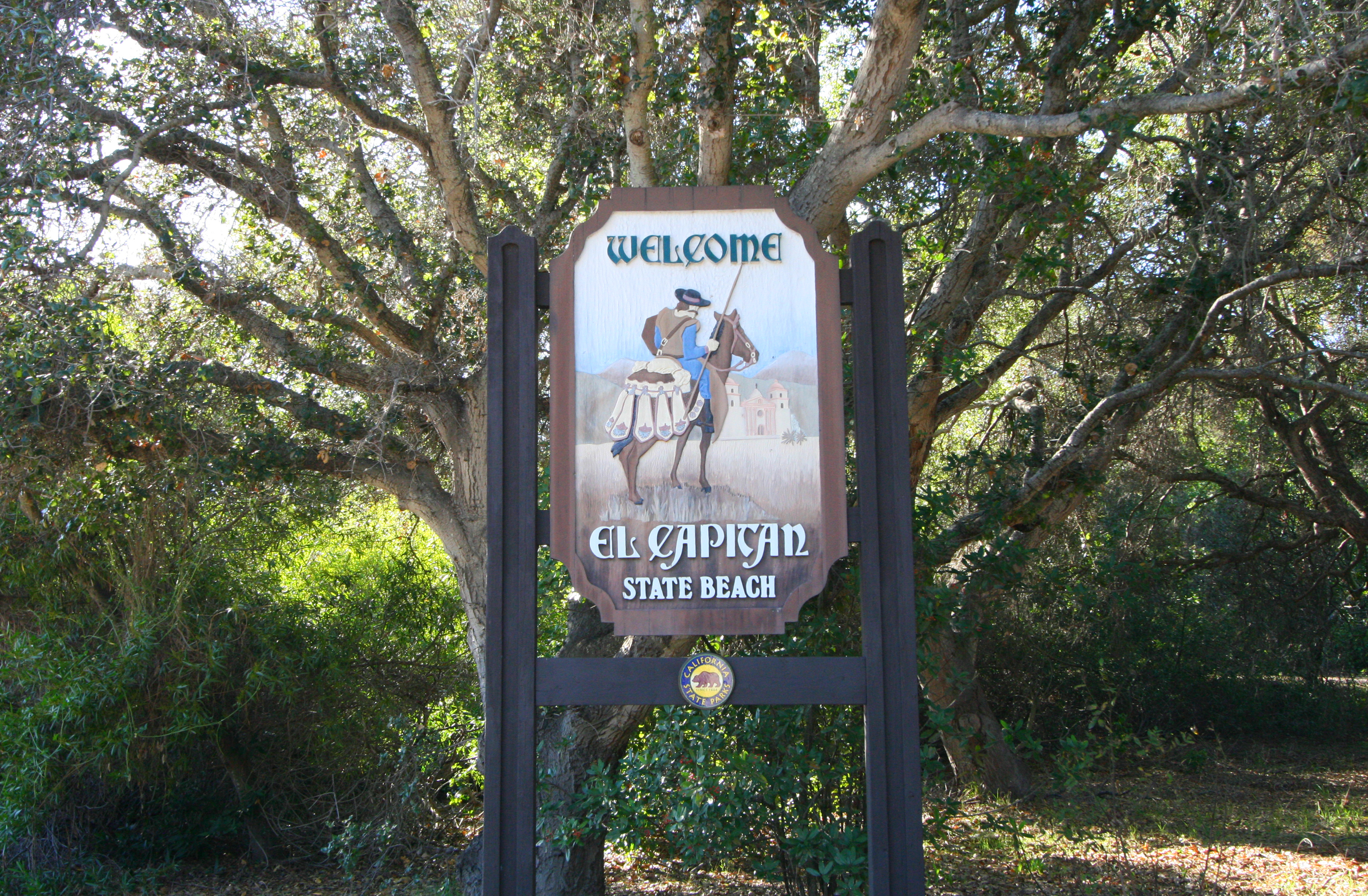
Welcome sign.

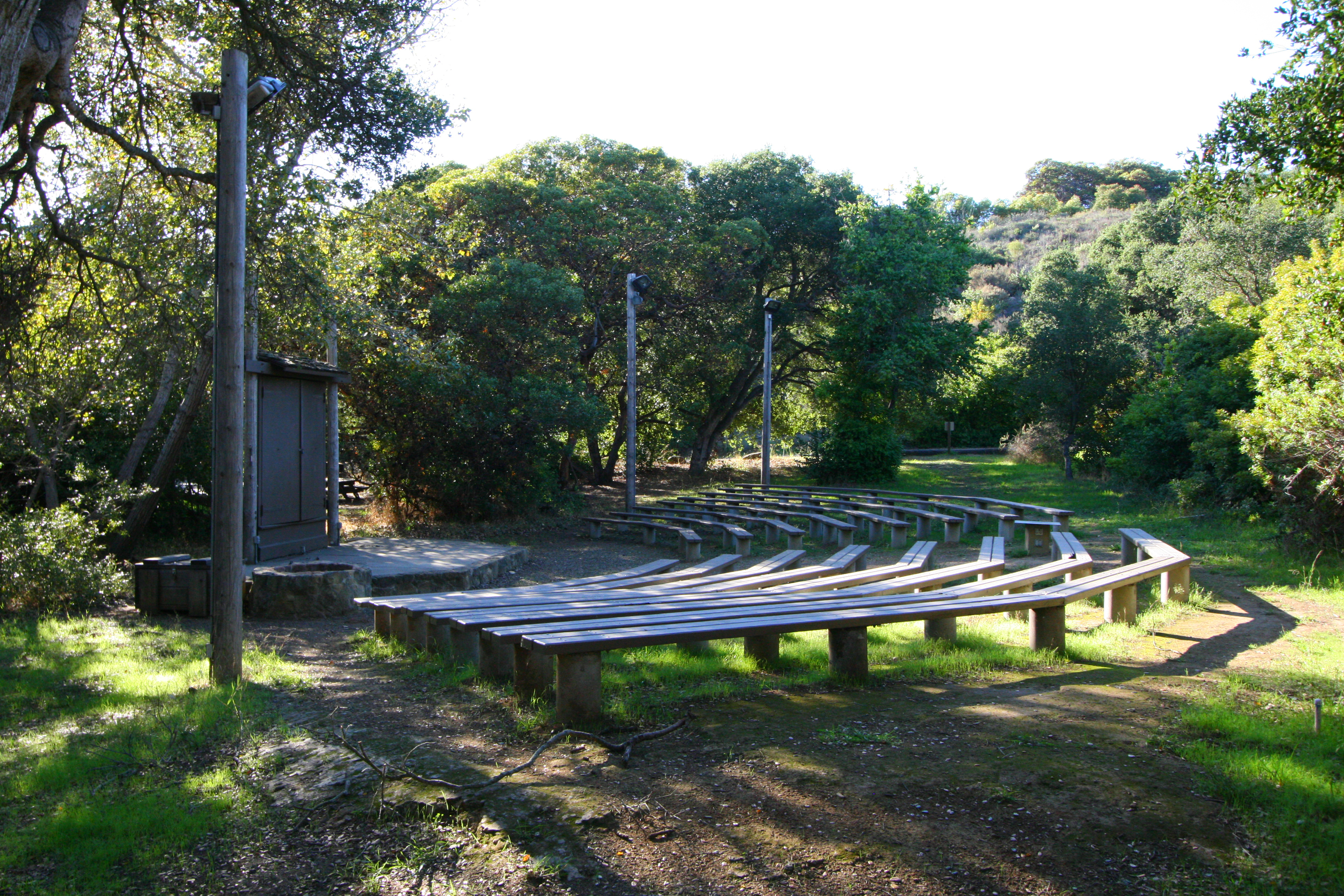
Amphitheater at campground.

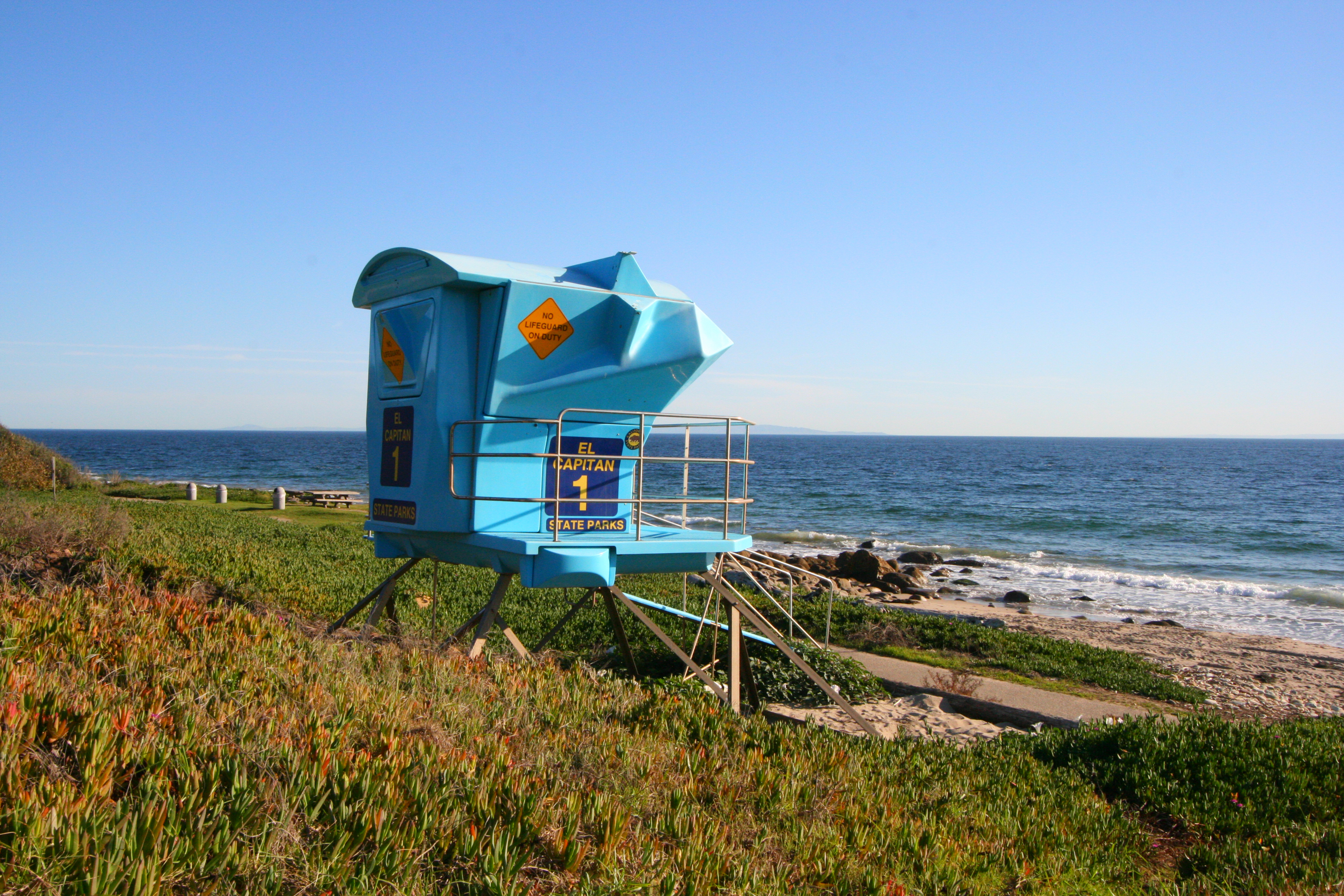
Lifeguard station.

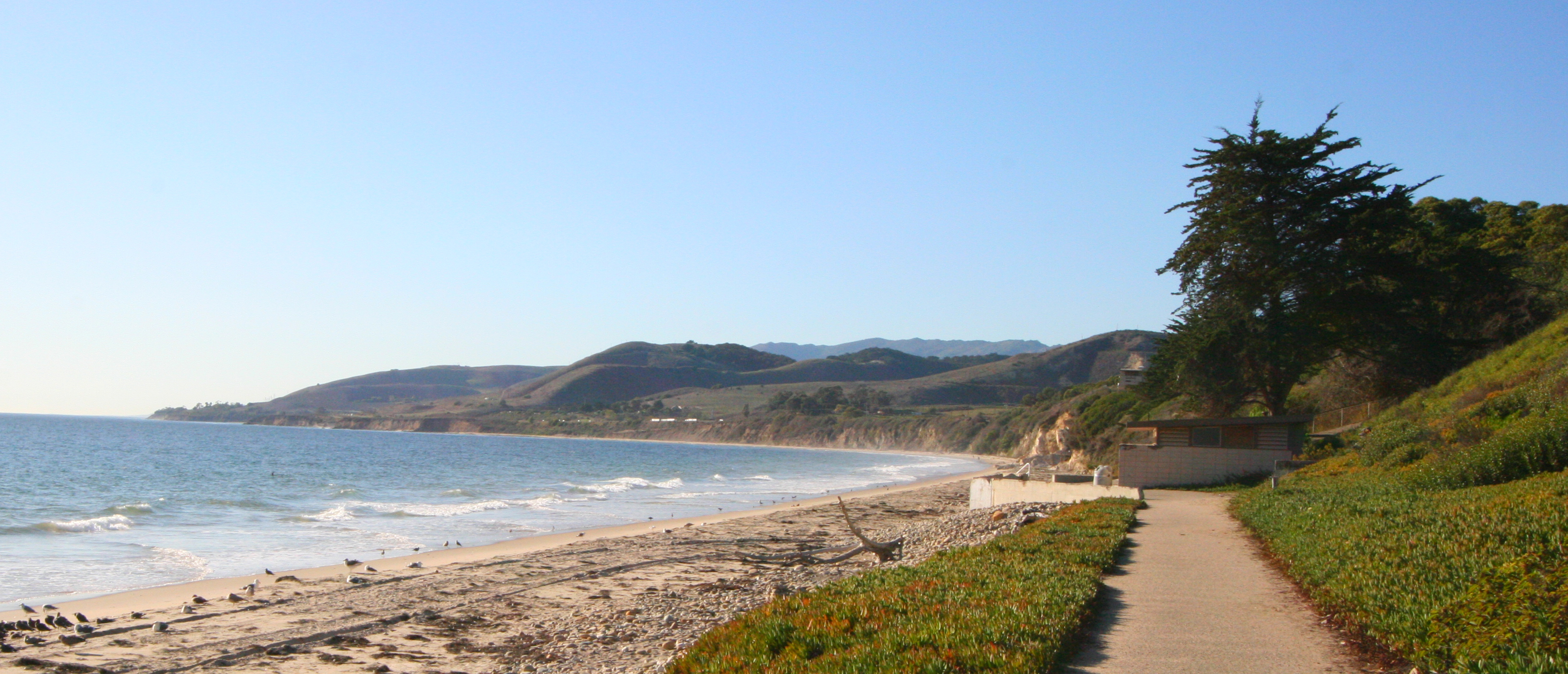
View of beach looking west.

== See also ==
- List of beaches in California
- List of California state parks
