= Campus Point State Marine Conservation Area =

Marine protected area off California

Coordinates: 34.38°N 119.87°W

Campus Point State Marine Conservation Area (SMCA) is a marine protected area that protects the waters along and off the coast of the University of California, Santa Barbara, the student community of Isla Vista, and the University's Coal Oil Point Reserve. The SMCA covers 10.51 square miles, including Goleta Point (also known as "Campus Point"). The marine protected areas protect natural habitats and marine life by prohibiting or limiting removal of wildlife from within their boundaries.

== Establishment ==
Campus Point SMCA is one of 36 marine protected areas adopted by the California Fish and Game Commission in December, 2010 during the third phase of the Marine Life Protection Act Initiative. The MLPAI is a collaborative public process to create a statewide network of protected areas along California's coastline. The south coast's new marine protected areas were designed by local divers, fishermen, conservationists and scientists who comprised the South Coast Regional Stakeholder Group. The task was to design a network of protected areas that would preserve sensitive sea life and habitats while enhancing recreation, study and education opportunities. The south coast marine protected areas went into effect in 2012.

== Habitat and wildlife ==
Campus Point SMCA is designed to protect habitat and species diversity. This SMCA represents and protects a wide diversity of habitat types including eelgrass, surfgrass, kelp, rocky reefs, shallow subtidal, rocky intertidal, oil seeps, sand, and the estuarine inputs of Devereux Slough. It's also known as one of the best places for the Western snowy plover.

== Recreation and nearby attractions ==
Campus Point SMCA prohibits the take of all living marine resources. California's marine protected areas encourage recreational and educational uses of the ocean. Activities such as kayaking, diving, snorkeling, and swimming are allowed.

University of California, Santa Barbara has miles of sandy beaches, a semi-enclosed lagoon and a Marine Science Institute. Access to the coast along this fully marine protected area is available from Goleta Beach County Park, various coastal access points on University property, staircases and trails in the community of Isla Vista, and from the Ellwood Beach area of Goleta. The dunes and blufftop here are part of an elaborate restoration effort, including a docent program to protect and interpret the nesting area of rare snowy plover shorebirds.
