= Goleta Point =

Peninsula in California, United States

Coordinates: 34°24′18″N 119°50′39″W

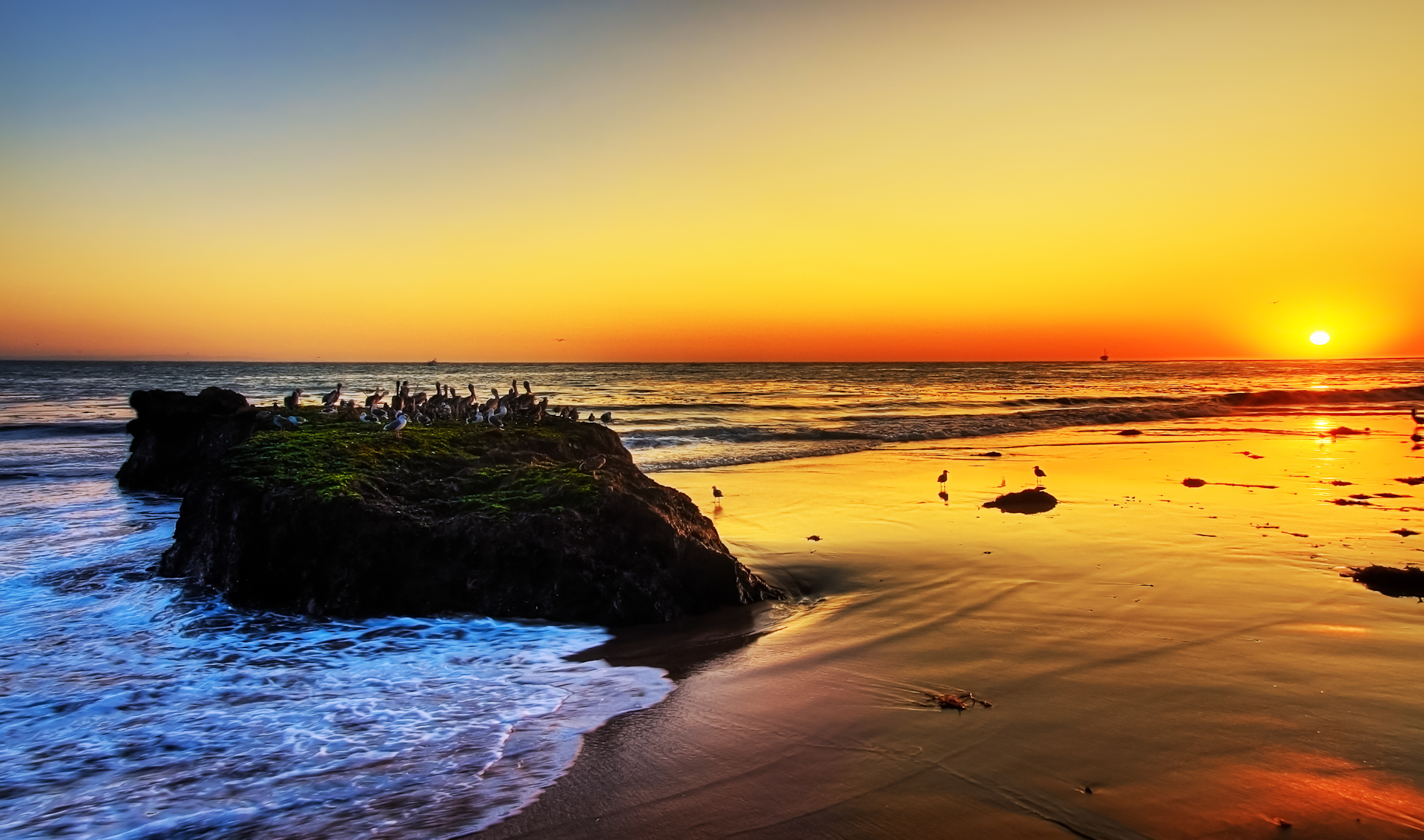
Shorebirds on the rocky Goleta Point

Goleta Point (also known as Campus Point) is a small peninsula at the southern end of the Gaviota Coast on the central coast in the U.S. state of California. It is located 3 miles (4.8 km) southwest of the city of Goleta. Situated within the campus of University of California, Santa Barbara (UCSB), it is characterized by a beach cliff, crashing waves, and a view of the Channel Islands across the Santa Barbara Channel. The rock formation is frequented by shorebirds.

== History ==
From 1870 to 1890, Goleta Point was used as a whaling camp, with Italian and Portuguese crews situated at the locale. Goleta Point contained a defunct United States Marine Corps Santa Barbara Air Station when it was purchased in 1950 by the University of California. The site is now known as Campus Point. The Campus Point State Marine Conservation Area was established in 2012.

== Geography ==
Goleta Point, located 6.5 miles (10.5 km) west of Santa Barbara Point, terminates in a cliff about 30 feet (9.1 m) in height. Coal Oil Point is 2 miles (3.2 km) west of Goleta Point. The Isla Vista community is located between Goleta Point and Coal Oil Point. From Goleta Point to Point Conception, 32 miles (51 km), the coast is more rugged than further east. A rock projecting 15 feet (4.6 m) lies in the ocean, 5.5 miles (8.9 km) west of Goleta Point. The point is west of the Santa Barbara Light. Goleta (Mores) Landing, 1.75 miles (2.82 km) east of Goleta Point, has a depth of 15 feet (4.6 m) at the end of the wharf. The Goleta Pier is located about 1.75 miles (2.82 km) from this point; from the pier, the university campus is 1 mile (1.6 km) to the west. Goleta Point is on sheltered stretch of the coast line which is not affected by the westerly and northwesterly winds. The water is clean.

Goleta point is said to contain one of Santa Barbara's best surf breaks. The break conditions are dependent entirely on the wind direction, direction of the swell, and the tide can create unfavorable conditions. But generally, waves generated in a southwest direction are head high and to a slightly medium height. During an above-average break point "swell wells up to create a solid face that has a wide peak." During low and medium tide periods, the rides can be of longer duration provided the tide does not bounce back from the reef.
