= Gaviota Coast =

Rural area of Santa Barbara County, California

- Region
- Location within California
- Coordinates: 34°28′15″N 120°13′29″W
- Location: Santa Barbara County, California
- Water bodies: Pacific Ocean

Area
  - Total: 200,000 hectares (490,000 acres)

Dimensions
  - Length: 76 miles (122 km)
- Elevation: 7.0 m (23 ft)
- GNIS feature ID: 1702035
- ZIP codes: 93117, 93436

The Gaviota Coast in Santa Barbara County, California, is a rural coastline along the Santa Barbara Channel roughly bounded by Goleta Point on the south and the north boundary of the county on the north. This last undeveloped stretch of Southern California coastline consists of dramatic bluffs, isolated beaches and terraced grasslands.

== History ==
Sites inhabited in the Paleoindian Period (13,000–8,500 B.P.) have been found through archeological deposits at the mouths of rivers and along the seashore where there was an abundance of food. At least fourteen Chumash villages were located along the coastline including Qasil, Tajiguas, and Shishuchi'i'.

The Spanish began colonizing Alta California with the Portolá expedition of 1769–1770. Much of the area is within several ranchos including the 1794 Spanish land grant, Rancho Nuestra Señora del Refugio and the Mexican land grants, Rancho Punta de la Concepcion (1837), Rancho Cañada del Corral (1841) and Rancho Dos Pueblos (1842).

Near the end of the 1920s, an oil boom started at the Ellwood Oil Field resulting in additional drilling along the coast. During World War II, a Japanese submarine shelled the pier, tanks, and associated equipment. The Bombardment of Ellwood began in the evening of February 23, 1942. A few weeks after the attack on Pearl Harbor, the Continental United States came under attack. A radio address by President Franklin D. Roosevelt was being broadcast when the sub surfaced in the Santa Barbara Channel. No one was hurt but there was damage to an oil pier. The incident created fear, and panic on the West Coast. The Army set up a radar unit where a beach resort had developed in the early 1920s as the automobile age began and the beaches became a popular destination for motorists. After the unit was decommissioned in 1946, the owners sold the property to the state and Refugio State Beach continued as a popular beach getaway. In 1953, the state purchased another private campground and created El Capitán State Beach.

Congress ordered a study in 1999 for a proposed 76-mile-long (122 km) National Seashore from Coal Oil Point at UC Santa Barbara to Point Sal at the northern boundary of Vandenberg Space Force Base. Although the National Park Service found the area suitable with nationally significant natural and cultural resources, the study found the establishment to not be feasible due to local opposition within the approximately 200,000 acres (81,000 ha) study area and the high cost of acquiring land and operating a new park.

Crude oil and natural gas produced by offshore platforms is processed at onshore receiving plants connected to distant refineries by pipelines. The Refugio oil spill on May 19, 2015, immediately north of Refugio State Beach, leaked 142,800 U.S. gallons (3,400 barrels; 541,000 liters) of crude oil out of one of the pipelines.

In July 2015, the Northern Chumash Tribal Council submitted aa nomination of the ocean area off the Gaviota Coast for inclusion in a national marine sanctuary. After a positive review of the nomination, the National Oceanic and Atmospheric Administration (NOAA) began the process of designating the Chumash Heritage National Marine Sanctuary with a public comment process in 2021. Under the original proposal, it would have included about 7,600 square miles (19,700 km^{2}) of the Pacific Ocean and its shoreline would have extended for 156 miles (251 km), including coastal landmarks significant to the Chumash people's heritage from Gaviota Creek north to Santa Rosa Creek near the town of Cambria in San Luis Obispo County. NOAA designated the sanctuary on October 11, 2024, with an area of 4,543 square miles (11,766 km^{2}) and a 116-mile (187 km) coastline stretching from just south of the Diablo Canyon Power Plant in San Luis Obispo County southward to Naples Reef off Santa Barbara County. The sanctuary has extensive kelp forests, vast sandy beaches, coastal dunes, and wetlands serving as nursery grounds for numerous commercial fish species and important habitats for many threatened and endangered species.

=== Alisal Fire ===
The Alisal Fire ignited in the afternoon of October 11, 2021; it burned 16,970 acres (6,868 ha) and destroyed 12 homes. One of the last blazes of the 2021 California wildfire season, the wildfire broke out near the Alisal Reservoir and strong northwest winds rapidly pushed the fire south through the rugged Los Padres National Forest. The fire grew by hundreds of acres within hours as sundowner winds fanned the flames over the summit of the Santa Ynez Mountains towards the Tajiguas Landfill. Gusting winds up to 70 miles per hour (110 km/h) prevented the dispatch of aircraft that were at the ready. Critically low fuel moisture resulted in very extreme fire behavior during the first two nights. The next day as winds turned more favorable, tanker jets created fire breaks by dispersing fire retardant. Throughout each day, the turnaround was quick as ground crews reloaded the aircraft at the Santa Maria Air Tanker Base. After the fire crossed Route 101 to Tajiguas Beach, it expanded east and west and kept the highway closed for over three days. Commuter and long-distance rail service were also suspended during that period. The state beaches, Gaviota, Refugio, and El Capitán, closed as the firefighters used them for housing, access, and staging. The fire burned the filtration system which uses wood chips at the Tajiguas Landfill and damaged the drainage system, the landfill gas collection system, and some heavy equipment. Crews worked to keep the fire away from buildings on the scattered ranches, the shuttered Exxon Mobil facility in Las Flores canyon, and Rancho del Cielo, the vacation home of President Ronald Reagan and First Lady Nancy Reagan. Freedom Lake, one of two lakes at the ranch, has been used to supply aerial water drops. Four single residences were reported destroyed on October 16, along with two outbuildings that suffered damage. Firefighters prepared for expected higher temperatures and drier winds. The fire was fully contained on November 20. Preparations for potential mudslides, and debris flows began with a team of engineers, scientists, and geologists determining at-risk spots. Highway 101 repair projects included clearing and repairing damaged drainage culverts and installing rock netting on bare hillsides. Volunteer efforts included efforts to help the native vegetation grow back where bulldozers had created fire lines.

=== Fossils ===
The coastline is rich in fossils.

== Geography ==
The campus of the University of California, Santa Barbara (UCSB) is at the southern end of the Gaviota Coast marked by Goleta Point also known as Campus Point with the north boundary of the county roughly marking the northerly limit. Situated on a narrow coastal terrace between a rugged coastline along the Santa Barbara Channel and the Santa Ynez Mountains which parallels the coast along its entire length. The north end of the mountain range diverges into two low ridges, separated by Jalama Creek, which then vanish into the Pacific Ocean just before reaching Lompoc. The Santa Ynez River flows just north of the mountains, paralleling them for most of their length. Much of the mountain range is within the Los Padres National Forest, The mountains parallel the Channel Islands to the south, another east–west trending range which is a geologic extension of the Santa Monica Mountains.

The Gaviota Creek watershed is the largest watershed along this coast and is the most important steelhead stream in Southern Santa Barbara County. Refugio Creek is one of the larger coastal streams along the coast and descends through a mosaic of commercial orchards, ranches, and rural residential developments and crosses under Highway 101 before flowing into the Pacific Ocean.

The Bacara Resort was constructed on a formerly undeveloped section of the coast in 2000 at the western edge of the city of Goleta.

== Natural environment ==
The coastal waters are considered unique for the biodiversity of ocean life. The unusual species found here are the result of the cold water from the north meeting the warm water from the south. The annual migration of about 19,000 Gray whales through the Santa Barbara Channel may come as close as 100 feet (30 m) from the shoreline. The marine environment has extensive kelp forests and wetlands serving as nursery grounds for numerous commercial fish species and important habitat for many threatened and endangered species.

With the Mediterranean climate, the unusual abundance and diversity of wildlife includes an estimated 1,400 plant and animal species. The Santa Ynez Mountains are a migration corridor for wildlife from the large interior region of California. Wildlife includes mountain lions, black bears, badgers, golden eagles, and the California condor. A 2023 study showed the need to improve wildlife corridors by fixing culverts to accommodate larger species such as mule deer and mountain lion.

== Resource utilization and protection ==
The county adopted a coastal land use plan in 1982 that was consistent with their policies and development standards to preserve the natural scenic beauty. The narrow coastal terrace is primarily used for recreation and cattle grazing. The lightly populated area has large ranches with much of the land held in agricultural preserves under the Williamson Act and used for avocado, lemon and other fruit orchards. Protected areas along US 101 include three public beaches with campgrounds and hiking trails: Gaviota State Park, El Capitán State Beach, and Refugio State Beach. There are also several private campgrounds. There are several marine protected area off the coast: Point Conception State Marine Reserve, Naples State Marine Conservation Area, Kashtayit State Marine Conservation Area and Chumash Heritage National Marine Sanctuary.

Dos Pueblos, a 214-acre ranch (87 ha), was subdivided as Naples, but remained undeveloped. The ranch is within Rancho Dos Pueblos, a 15,535-acre (62.87 km^{2}) Mexican land grant, stretching between the Goleta Slough and the boundary of El Capitan State Beach. Dos Pueblos Institute uses the ranch as an outdoor classroom teaching sustainable agriculture and provides Chumash bands with a place for ceremonies. The Cultured Abalone Farm, which is situated on the ranch, is partnering with the Santa Barbara Museum of Natural History Sea Center and the National Oceanic and Atmospheric Administration Southwest Fisheries Science Center on the White Abalone Restoration Consortium, which is studying this endangered marine snail and restoring the wild populations. They are also collaborating in developing curriculum to educate the next generation about sustainable aquaculture and conservation.

Hollister Ranch has six beaches but they are difficult for the public to access. Some of the ranches are also luxury estates. El Rancho Tajiguas is a 3,600 acres (1,500 ha) working ranch that was developed with two luxury homes over a period of 40 years under the ownership of Mansour Ojjeh. The 1,800 acres (730 ha) Las Varas Ranch was purchased by Charlie Munger and donated to the University of California, Santa Barbara in 2018.

The area was one of the earliest locations in California developed for offshore oil and gas production. Crude oil and natural gas are produced from offshore platforms. The Hondo and Harmony oil rigs can be easily seen offshore in front of the Channel Islands in the Santa Barbara Channel from the highway or railroad. Local land use agencies have kept oil processing facilities to a minimum while the oil and gas are processed at onshore receiving plants before being transported to distant refineries.

The Strauss Wind Farm, consisting of twenty-seven windmills atop rolling hills near the ocean, powered up in 2023. The first wind power complex on the California coast is about 3.5 miles (5.6 km) southwest of Lompoc, the nearly 3,000-acre site (1,200 ha) includes IdentiFlight, a way to identify approaching raptors and temporarily stop the turbines before the raptors enter rotor range, as red-tailed hawks are common here.

The remote coastline is used as a landing for human and drug smuggling from Mexico.

== Transportation ==
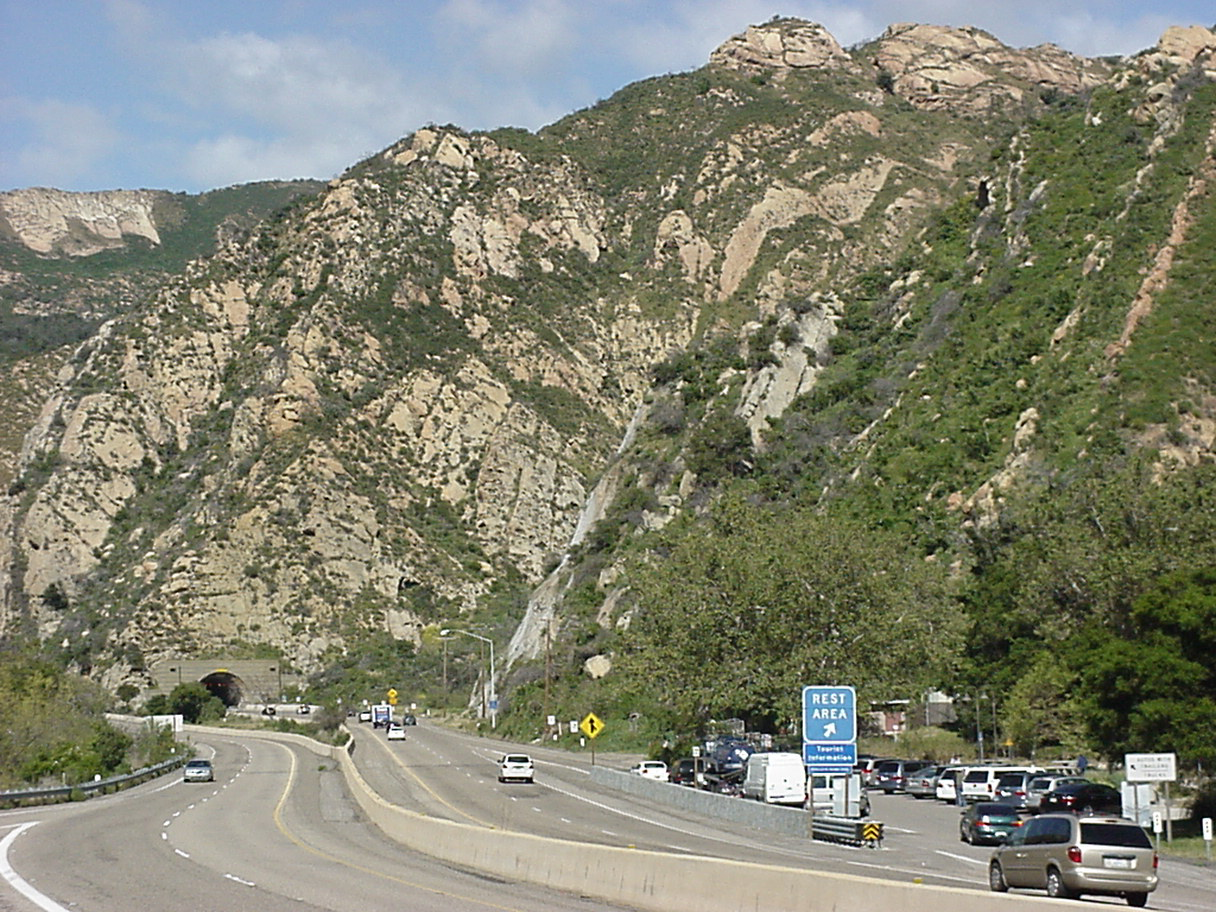
US 101 northbound approaching Gaviota Tunnel through the Santa Ynez Mountains

US 101 and the main coastal railroad line both parallel the coastline atop the coastal bluff with train trestles crossing the stream beds that cut through the slope. The 21-mile-long (34 km) section of US 101 from the north boundary of Goleta to State Route 1 at Las Cruces is designated by the state as a scenic highway. While the highway turns inland at Gaviota State Park, the coastal bluff section of the rail line is longer at 30 miles (48 km) traversing areas mostly inaccessible to the public. A 2.5-mile (4.0 km) section of the California Coastal Trail was built within Gaviota State Park. An Interim alignment for a section of the trail from Guadalupe to the state park is under study. These routes follow Chumash and Spanish Period trails.
