= Rancho Dos Pueblos =

Land grant in California

Coordinates: 34.470°N 119.850°W

Rancho Dos Pueblos was a 15,535-acre (62.87 km^{2}) Mexican land grant in present day Santa Barbara County, California given in 1842 by Governor Juan Alvarado to Nicolas A. Den. The rancho stretched along the Gaviota Coast to the northwest of today's city of Santa Barbara, from Fairview Avenue in Goleta (at that time in the middle of Goleta Slough) to the southeastern boundary of today's El Capitan State Beach. A 500-acre parcel (200 ha) was bought by Colin Powys Campbell in 1919. The University of California, Santa Barbara purchased it from the Devereux Foundation in 2007, following the closure of the campus it had established there in 1945.

== History ==
The first European visitors to the coast of California were Spanish maritime explorers led by Juan Rodríguez Cabrillo, who spent several days around the Channel Islands in 1542 before sailing farther north. It's quite possible that one of Cabrillo's shore parties landed at Dos Pueblos Creek to take on fresh water. If so, they would have met the Chumash people who lived in two towns on either side of the creek.

A land expedition led by Gaspar de Portolà camped at Dos Pueblos Creek on August 21-22, 1769, on its way to Monterey Bay. Franciscan missionary Juan Crespi, who accompanied the expedition, noted the presence of two native towns, facing each other across the creek from the bluffs above, near the ocean. He therefore named the place "Dos Pueblos de San Luis Obispo". The name San Luis Obispo was later used for the mission farther north, but Dos Pueblos remained.

Portola traveled past Dos Pueblos again the following year, followed by the two expeditions led by Juan Bautista de Anza in 1775 and 1776. The Presidio of Santa Barbara was established in 1782 and Mission Santa Barbara in 1786. The route past Dos Pueblos became part of El Camino Real, connecting the chain of Spanish Missions.

Rancho Dos Pueblos was granted by governor Alvarado to Nicholas (Spanish spelling = Nicolas) A. Den (1812 - 1862) in 1842. Den was an Irish immigrant who came to Alta California by sea in 1836. Den had studied to become a doctor in Dublin at Trinity College, where he got his degree and became the first medical doctor in the Santa Barbara area. He married Rosa Hill, a daughter of Daniel A. Hill, first American resident of Santa Barbara. Rosa was a great-granddaughter of José Francisco Ortega, grantee of Rancho Nuestra Señora del Refugio further northwest along the coast. Daniel Hill's Rancho La Goleta was adjacent to Dos Pueblos on the southeast, toward Santa Barbara.

Nicolas died in 1862, leaving ten children. In his will Den bequeathed the western half of the original Rancho Dos Pueblos grant to his wife Rosa Den, and the remaining half was placed in trust to be apportioned equally to their ten children when they came of age.

With the cession of California to the United States following the Mexican-American War, the 1848 Treaty of Guadalupe Hidalgo provided that the land grants would be honored. As required by the Land Act of 1851, a claim for Dos Pueblos was filed with the Public Land Commission in 1852, and the grant was patented to Nicolas A. Den in 1877.

In 1869, Rosa Den sold the easternmost 3,600 acres (15 km^{2}) to Colonel W.W. Hollister (1818 - 1886) who named it Rancho Glen Annie in honor of his wife, Annie James Hollister. The minor heirs of Nicolas A. Den were still alive and there was a question of whether the property could be sold. Den's descendant Alfonso Den inherited the land now called Isla Vista; he and some of his nine siblings were plaintiffs in a lawsuit, because when they were minors their land had been illegally sold to Hollister in 1869. San Francisco lawyer, Thomas B. Bishop, who specialized in transfers of Mexican land rights, sued Hollister on behalf of the Den children in 1876, and won the case in 1890. Bishop received much of the land owned by the Den children as a legal fee - land now called Bishop Ranch, near Glen Annie Road in the city of Goleta.

== See also ==
- Ranchos of California
- List of Ranchos of California
