= Shishuchi'i', California =

Human settlement in United States of America

Shishuchi'i' was a Native American village of the Chumash people located in the modern-day county of Santa Barbara, California in the United States.

The village was situated on the Pacific coast, near the current Refugio State Beach.

== See also ==
- Chumash settlements
- Native Americans in California
- Native American history of California
