= Rancho Nuestra Señora del Refugio =

Spanish land grant in Santa Barbara County, California

Coordinates: 34.480°N 120.170°W

The Rancho Nuestra Señora del Refugio ("Ranch of Our Lady of Refuge") was a 74,000-acre (300 km^{2}) Spanish land grant to José Francisco Ortega in 1794 and is the only land grant made under Spanish and confirmed by USA in 1866 to Jose Maria Ortega under the US Supreme Court rule in what is today Santa Barbara County, California. A Mexican title was granted to Antonio Maria Ortega in 1834 by Mexican Governor José Figueroa. The grant extended along the Pacific coast from Cojo Canyon east of Point Conception, past Arroyo Hondo and Tajiguas Canyon, to Refugio Canyon, including what is now Gaviota Coast.

== History ==
The first European visitors to California were Spanish maritime explorers led by Juan Rodríguez Cabrillo, who sailed up and down the coast in 1542. Spanish explorer Sebastián Vizcaíno again sailed along the California coast in 1602. Spanish ships associated with the Manila Galleon trade probably made emergency stops along the coast during the next 167 years, but no permanent settlements were established.

The first land expedition to California, led by Gaspar de Portolà, camped at today's Tajiguas Creek on August 23, 1769, on its way to Monterey Bay. Franciscan missionary Juan Crespi, who accompanied the expedition, noted the presence of two native towns, facing each other across the creek, near the ocean—similar to the arrangement found the previous day at Dos Pueblos.

The following two days, August 24–25, the expedition moved on along the coast to the west, still over lands that later belonged to the rancho. On the 24th, the camp was at Gaviota Creek, and now Gaviota State Park. The soldiers named the place La Gaviota (Spanish for seagull). On the 25th, the party camped at today's El Bullito Creek, about halfway between Gaviota and Point Conception.

The rancho was granted to José Francisco Ortega, who in 1769 had served as an expedition scout for that first Portola expedition. As leader of the scouts, Ortega was among the first Europeans to see many places in California, including San Francisco Bay. Ortega played an important role in the founding of the Santa Barbara Presidio in 1782. In 1786, after his retirement, Ortega received approval for the Rancho Nuestra Señora del Refugio land grant and built his home in Refugio Canyon in 1794. The grant was confirmed to his son Antonio Maria Ortega in 1834 by Mexican Governor Figueroa.

With the cession of California to the United States following the Mexican–American War, the 1848 Treaty of Guadalupe Hidalgo provided that the land grants would be honored. As required by the Land Act of 1851, a claim for Rancho Nuestra Señora del Refugio was filed with the Public Land Commission in 1853, and patented to Antonio Maria Ortega in 1866.

The first sale of lands belonging to Rancho Nuestra Senora del Refugio to non-family members, the Gaviota Ranch, occurred in 1858. In 1866, Thomas B. Dibblee of Rancho San Julian, acquired several parcels originally included in the Rancho, and he eventually owned approximately three-quarters of the original grant. William Welles Hollister purchased the 14,500-acre (59 km^{2}) Hollister Ranch land in 1866. The Dibblee-Hollister partnership owned several land grants in the Santa Barbara area. With the sale of Arroyo Hondo in 1889, all rancho lands had been sold by the Ortegas.

== Historic sites of the Rancho ==
Ortega settlements were also established at Tajiguas Canyon, Arroyo Hondo, and Cañada del Corral. Privateers under Hippolyte Bouchard burned the original ranch buildings at Refugio Canyon in 1818, but the adobes at Arroyo Hondo and Canada del Corral still remain.

The adobe at Arroyo Hondo, and a small orchard planted by the padres at the Mission Santa Inés are still present at the Arroyo Hondo Preserve which is now owned and managed by the Land Trust for Santa Barbara County. The ranch at Tajiguas Canyon featured the first lemon orchard planted in California.

== See also ==
- Ranchos of California
- List of Ranchos of California
