= Qasil, California =

Native American village in California, U.S.

Coordinates: 34.4669°N 120.0645°W

Qasil was a Native American village of the Chumash people located in the county of Santa Barbara, California in the United States.

Juan Crespí described an old abandoned village at Refugio when he passed by in 1769 ... apparently resettled by 1776 ... occupied until its inhabitants were recruited into the mission system. The village was situated on the Gaviota Coast, near an ocean bluff slightly to the east of Refugio State Beach.

== Trade center ==
Qasil may have been used as an important trading point and port for the neighboring Chumash people of Santa Cruz Island. The village was also connected to the Santa Ynez Valley further inland by a trail which may have been used to transport trading items. Some evidence has been found to indicate that the village was a center for boatbuilding. Remains of boats have also been found at Qasil's site.

== Decimation ==
The settlement was known to be inhabited until 1796 when it had a reported population of 142. Shortly afterward, the villagers were "recruited" in Indian Reductions into the local Christian mission and displaced from their land.

== Etymology ==
The word 'Qasil' means 'beautiful' in the local Chumashan language (known as Dos Pueblos).

== See also ==
- Population history of indigenous peoples of the Americas
- Native American history of California
- Rock art of the Chumash people
