= Gaviota State Park =

State park in Gaviota, California, United States

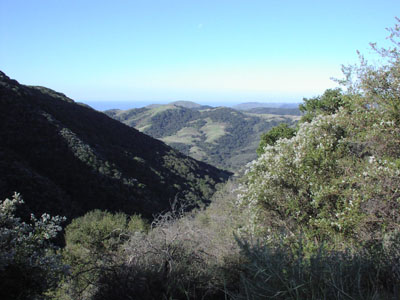
- Gaviota State Park from the Gaviota Peak Trail

- Location within California Location within the United States
- Location: Santa Barbara County, California, United States
- Nearest city: Goleta, California
- Coordinates: 34°29′25″N 120°13′45″W
- Area: 2,787 acres (11.28 km^{2})
- Established: 1953
- Governing body: California Department of Parks and Recreation

Gaviota State Park is a state park of California, United States. It is located in southern Santa Barbara County, California, about 33 miles (53 km) west of the city of Santa Barbara. One of three state parks along the Gaviota Coast, it extends from the Pacific coast to the crest of the Santa Ynez Mountains, and is adjacent to Los Padres National Forest. The 2,787-acre (1,128 ha) park was established in 1953.

== Geography ==
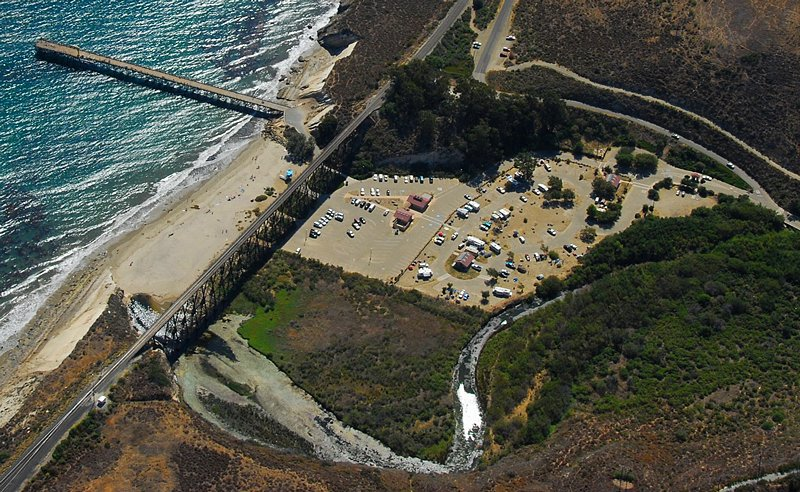
Gaviota Beach

The park is bisected by U.S. Route 101, which turns north from the coast at Gaviota, passing through the Gaviota Tunnel and Gaviota Pass, a deep canyon cut entirely through the southern branch of the Santa Ynez Mountains. Gaviota State Park consists of two units, one on each side of the highway. The western unit includes the beach and a campground, which receives most of the park's visitors.

Adjacent to the park on the west is a large region of private ranches and ranchettes known as Hollister Ranch, which extends for almost the entire distance to Point Conception (where the California coast turns to the north). Access to this portion of the coast is tightly secured, and possible only by water for non-residents.

=== Climate ===
The park is subject to a Mediterranean climate, with mild, rainy winters, and sunny summers, commonly with morning clouds. Temperatures below freezing are rare, and summertime high temperatures rise with increasing distance from the coast. Because of the topographical peculiarity of the region, a single deep canyon cut through the mountains, at certain times of year, most frequently in late spring, winds blow through the canyon with great force. These winds, known as Sundowners, are common all along the south coast of Santa Barbara County, but are frequently most violent in the Gaviota area.

== Ecology ==
Plant communities in the park include chaparral in the upland regions, oak woodlands elsewhere, and both native prairie and non-native grasslands. They are part of the California coastal sage and chaparral ecoregion. The portion of Gaviota Creek that passes through the park includes one of the highest quality riparian habitats remaining in southern Santa Barbara County, and it receives strict environmental protection.

Much of the park vegetation was burned in a large brushfire in June 2004, with wildfire being a natural part of the chaparral ecosystem.

Mountain lions have been encountered in the park, and warning signs are prominently posted. The park was closed for a month in 1992 following a near-fatal attack by a mountain lion on a 9-year-old boy.

== Facilities ==
=== Campground ===
The park includes a beach campground, which contains 39 campsites for RVs (up to 25 feet for most sites) and for tents. Additionally there are eight picnic sites.

=== Trails ===
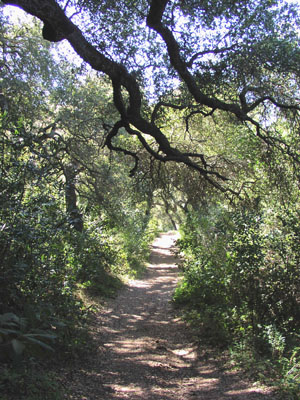
Trail through Oak Woodlands plant community in Gaviota State Park

Both sections of the park contain trails for hiking, horseback riding, and mountain biking. The most heavily traveled trail is a short dirt road leading to a popular hot spring on the eastern side of the highway. A more substantial trail beginning at the same trailhead leads out of the park to the summit of Gaviota Peak, the highest mountain in the vicinity at 2,458 feet (749 m). The isolated peak has expansive views in all directions; on a clear day, much of Santa Barbara County is visible as well as the coast as far south as the Santa Monica Mountains. Trails within the park total 34 miles (55 km) in all.

=== General Plan ===
An update to the 1979 General Plan which included an inventory of wildlife, historic, and archeological assets and an outline of issues and concerns was started in 2024. El Capitán and Refugio State beaches will be included in the recommendations for modernizing the infrastructure, adapting to climate change impacts and providing sustainable recreational opportunities.

== See also ==
- List of beaches in California
- List of California state parks
