= José Francisco Ortega =

New Spain soldier and Alta California settler (1734–1798)

Military officer, settler
- In office 1769–1795

Personal details
- Born: 1734 Celaya, Guanajuato, New Spain
- Died: February 1798 (aged 64) Santa Barbara, California
- Spouse: María Antonia Victoria Carrillo
- Profession: Soldier, explorer, settler, Commandant

Military service
- Allegiance: Spain
- Branch/service: Army of Spain
- Rank: Sergeant, Lieutenant
- Battles/wars: Portolá expedition, Mission San Juan Capistrano, Presidio establishment

José Francisco Ortega (Spanish pronunciation: [/hoʊˈzeɪ frænˈsɪskoʊ ɔːrˈteɪɡə/] ho-SEH fran-SIS-koh or-TEH-gah) was a soldier from New Spain and an early settler of Alta California. He joined the military at the age of twenty-one and rose to the rank of sergeant by the time he joined the Portola expedition in 1769. At the end of his military duty, he would be granted land, which he named Rancho Nuestra Señora del Refugio near Santa Barbara.

== Early life ==
Ortega was born in 1734 in Celaya, Guanajuato, New Spain. He was put in charge of the Royal warehouse. He was of indigenous background, but little else is known about his youth. In October 1755, he enlisted in the military as a private soldier to serve at the Royal Presidio at Misión Nuestra Señora de Loreto in Baja California. He rose to the rank of corporal on August 3, 1756, and on February 9, 1759 he rose to the rank of sergeant. In 1759 Ortega married María Antonia Victoria Carrillo (ca. 1742 – May 1803), daughter of another soldier, at Loreto. Ortega rejoined the army in 1768, having been recruited by California Governor Gaspar de Portolá to lead his expedition to explore and settle Alta California.

== Alta California ==
Spain had a plan to use Alta California as a military and commercial "buffer zone" starting in the 1760s. This migration north to secure settle Alta California came from a decree by King Carlos III, who wanted to keep its control away from the Russians, who were hunting seals off the coast of California. The overall goals of the Spanish Crown were to defend against the Russians, construct a mission north of San Diego, and to increase the number of Spanish settlers between San Diego and Monterey. The establishment of missions came under the guise of the viceroy of Mexico who had some objectives in mind: a native population for labor, sufficient land for agriculture, and enough water for that agriculture. Professor Richard L. Carrillo stated that this practice is known as "uti posidetis," where they had the right to the land that they settled, while ignoring the indigenous and their social and legal systems. Pedro Fages, a Spanish soldier also present during the Portola expedition, noted that the Indigenous Peoples they encountered served as guides to tell them which roads to take, where to find water sources, and were even given food such as fish and nuts. The expedition noted that, in the territory they called San Diego, Indigenous peoples dwelled in houses and belonged to villages. After establishing a base at San Diego on July 14, 1769, the expedition headed northbound. The expedition made camp in San Pedro Valley, and on November 1, 1769, Portola made Ortega the chief scout and sent him along with other men north to locate Monterey within three days. The following day, on November 2, some of the troops were out hunting deer and discovered a large body of water which was San Francisco Bay, and they promptly reported back to Ortega. The next day, on November 3, they returned to Portola to report their discovery. Prior to arriving at San Francisco Bay, Ortega, while standing on what is now the Berkeley Hills in October 1769, saw a small island on a body of water, which he reported to General Portola of his finding. This island turned out to be Angel Island. The Portola expedition, along with Ortega, returned to San Diego in 1770, but headed up north again to attempt to locate Monterey Bay, which proved to be difficult as they struggled with starvation and because of this, ate their mules. Along with starvation, the soldiers suffered from scurvy and fatigue. Ortega went ahead and encountered natives who directed him where to go to locate Monterey Bay. Due to the efforts of the expedition, the Spanish were able to build four presidios in Alta California: San Diego (1769), Monterey (1770), San Francisco (1776), and Santa Barbara (1782). These presidios functioned to: Protect the friars, laborers, and enforcers of subjugation; establish small settler townships; and fly the flag to warn any potential invaders.

Through his accomplishments and the support of Father Junipero Serra, he was promoted to the rank of Lieutenant and held the position of Commandant at the Presidio of San Diego from 1773 to 1781. Before that, he was Acting Commandant, from July 1771 in the absence of Pedro Fages. As Commandant he went with Fray Fermín Lasuén and twelve soldiers to explore the site chosen for Mission San Juan Capistrano. Junipero Serra supported Ortega to be Fages' successor as governor of the Californias but was unsuccessful. Ortega turned out to be a lackluster manager of finances and, as a result, was moved on from the Santa Barbara Presidio by Inspector Nicolas Soler and was replaced by Felipe de Goyocoechea. He would then serve as commandant of the Presidio of Monterey between 1787 and 1791 and then commandant of the Presidio of Loreto from 1792 to 1795.

== Retirement ==
In 1795, he retired as brevet captain with 40 years of service. Ortega was given a Spanish "land concession" in 1795 and an “award of war” by Governor Diego Borica, which he named Rancho Nuestra Señora del Refugio (Rancho Refugio) in Gaviota, which spanned six leagues. The land in which his rancho was established was near Point Conception, which happened to be by a Chumash village called Qasil (Casil). He had accumulated a substantial amount of debt over his lifetime and argued that he needed to keep this land to make money to pay his debts, at the behest of Fray Tapis, who argued that the land should go to the Chumash and the Santa Barbara Mission. At the age of 65, Ortega died after falling from his horse. He was laid to rest at the Mission of Santa Barbara in 1798.

== Family ==
Rancho Nuestra la Senora del Refugio fell under the control of Ortega's sons: Jose Maria Ortega and Francisco Maria Ortega. Jose Maria desired to add to the rancho in 1804 and asked Governor Jose de Arrillaga if he could usurp Rancho Dos Pueblos to El Cojo near Point Conception. The governor then sent the message to the mission friars Fray Tapis and Fray Juan Cortes who noted that the land was held in a trust and needed to be returned to the indigenous. His granddaughter, Maria de Guadalupe, married Joseph John Chapman, who was one of the first Anglo-Americans to see Los Angeles. Although he had been previously arrested for being a pirate, he proved to be a skilled craftsman as he worked as a blacksmith and as a carpenter. He converted to Catholicism in order to marry Maria de Guadalupe.

== Sources ==
- Military record in the Mission San Juan Capistrano archives
- Bancroft, Hubert Howe, The History of California (1884) Vol I. 1542–1800, pp. 670–671.
