= Jalama Beach County Park =

California county park

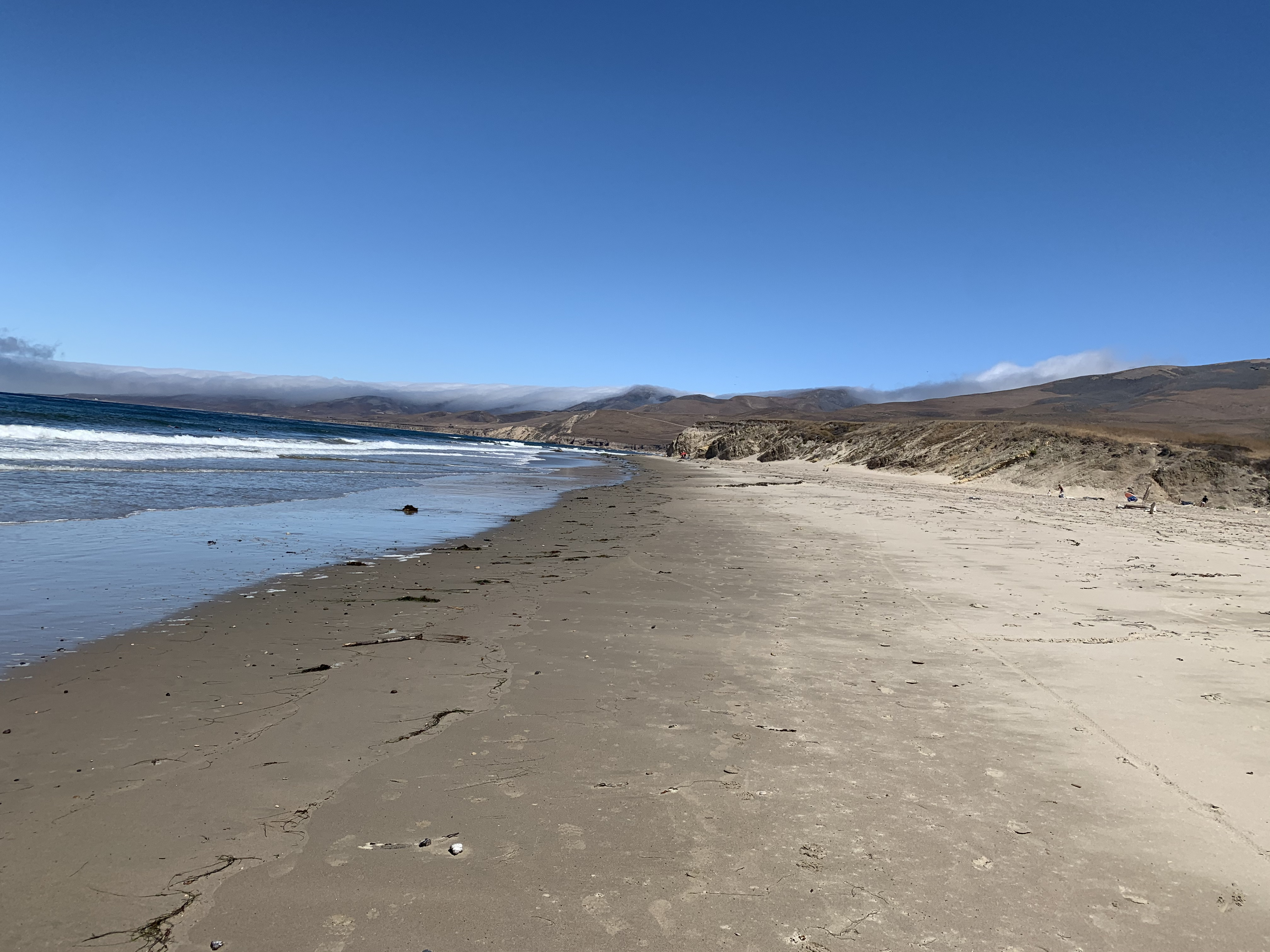
- Looking north at Jalama Beach County Park

- Location within California Location within the United States
- Location: Santa Barbara County, California
- Nearest city: Lompoc
- Coordinates: 34°51′09″N 120°50′12″W
- Area: 59.5 acres (24.1 ha)
- Established: 1943
- Governing body: Santa Barbara County Parks

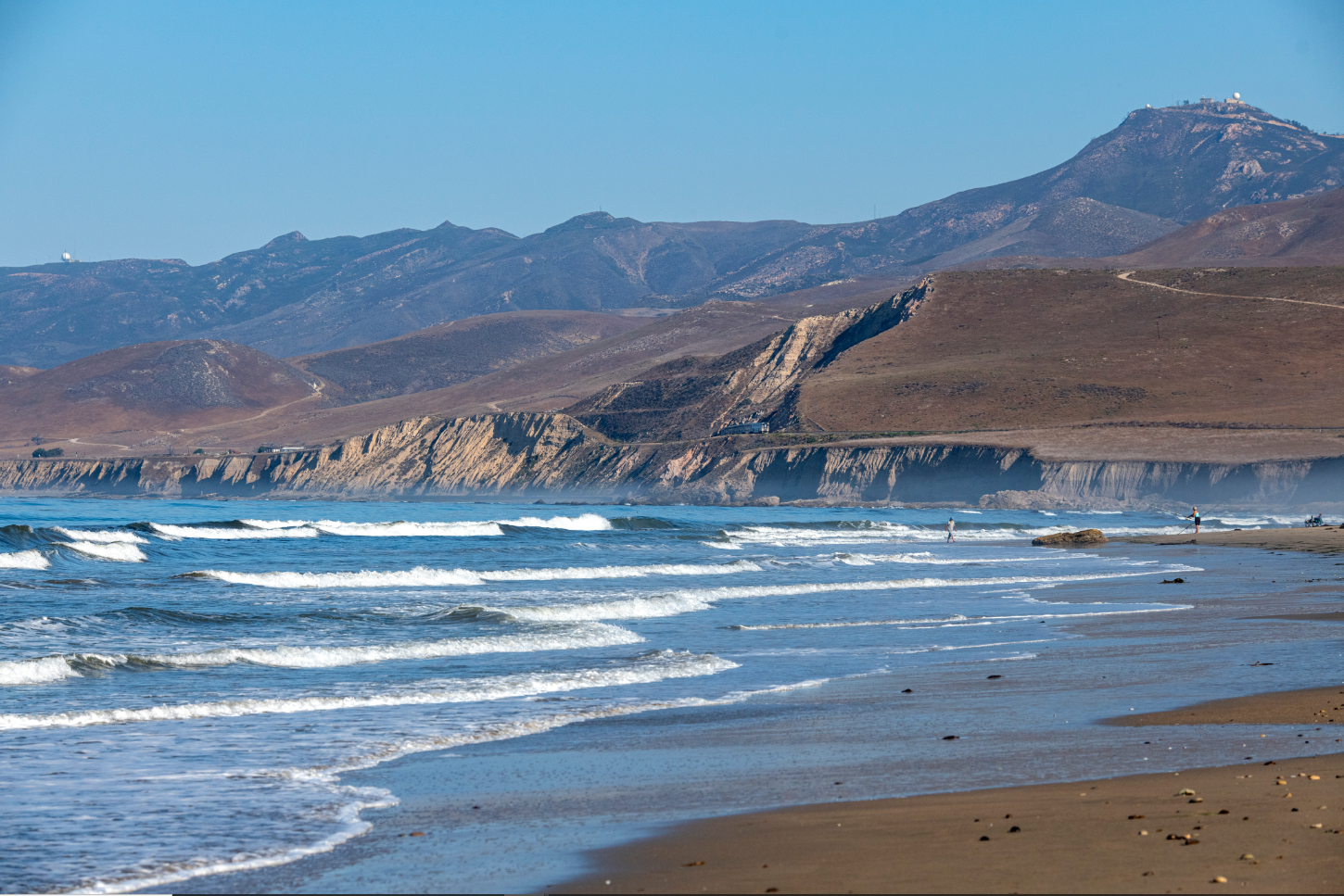
Jalama Beach is a popular site for surfing, sport fishing, and beachcombing.

Jalama Beach County Park is a seaside campground and park located at the mouth of Jalama Creek on the Gaviota Coast in Santa Barbara County, California, approximately 20 miles (32 km) southwest of Lompoc, off California State Route 1.

== History ==
Jalama was once the site of a Chumash People settlement named "Halama," "Jalam," "Xalam," or "Shilimaqstush." With the arrival of Spanish missionaries and the establishment of the La Purisima Mission in 1787, the inhabitants were relocated to the mission and the settlement was reportedly abandoned.

Following California's admission to the United States, the park became the property of the Atlantic Richfield Oil Company (ARCO). Despite being private property, citizens of nearby Lompoc frequently camped at the beach. In May 1943, the Atlantic Richfield Oil Company agreed to donate 23.5 acres (9.5 ha) of the beach to the County of Santa Barbara for use as a park. In 2007, an enforcement action by the California Coastal Commission, against Cojo and Jalama Ranches due to unpermitted development activities, resulted in an additional 36 acres (15 ha) of privately held land being donated to the County of Santa Barbara to further expand the beach.

== Features ==
Jalama features day-use picnic areas along with overnight camping facilities. There are 107 campsites, with 31 sites including electrical hookups and dump stations. The park also features the Jalama Beach Store, including the Jalama Grill.

== See also ==
- List of beaches in California
