= Refugio State Beach =

State beach in Santa Barbara County, California

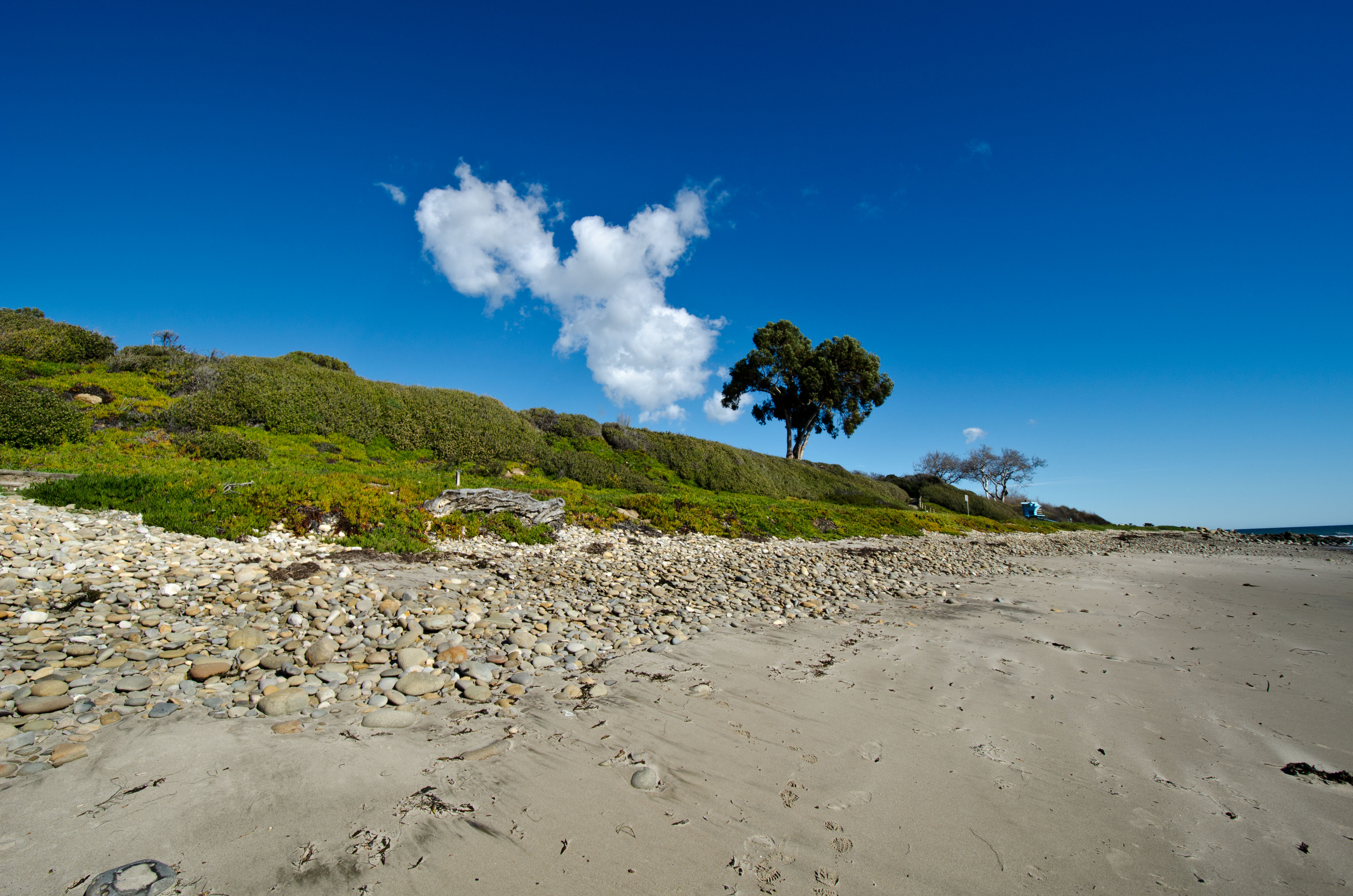
- Refugio State Beach in January 2013

- Location within California Location within the United States
- Location: Santa Barbara, California, United States
- Nearest city: Goleta
- Coordinates: 34°27′44″N 120°4′21″W
- Area: 20 acres (8.1 ha)
- Established: 1950
- Governing body: California Department of Parks and Recreation

Refugio State Beach (Chumash: Qasil, "Beautiful") is a protected state beach park in California, United States, approximately 20 miles (32 km) west of Santa Barbara. One of three state parks along the Gaviota Coast, it is 2.5 miles (4.0 km) west of El Capitán State Beach.

The Refugio oil spill occurred just north of the park in 2015 when a pipeline carrying crude oil ruptured. The spill went into a culvert that ran under US 101 and into the ocean. The spill spread over 7 miles (11 km) of coastline, including Refugio and El Capitán state beaches. The parks were closed during the clean-up, including during the typically busy Memorial Day weekend. The pipeline which caused the disaster is no longer in service.

An update to the 1979 General Plan which included an inventory of wildlife, historic, and archeological assets and an outline of issues and concerns was started in 2024. El Capitán State Beach and Gaviota State Park will be included in the recommendations for modernizing the infrastructure, adapting to climate change impacts and providing sustainable recreational opportunities.

== See also ==
- List of beaches in California
- List of California state parks
