= Santa Barbara County Fire Department =

American county fire department

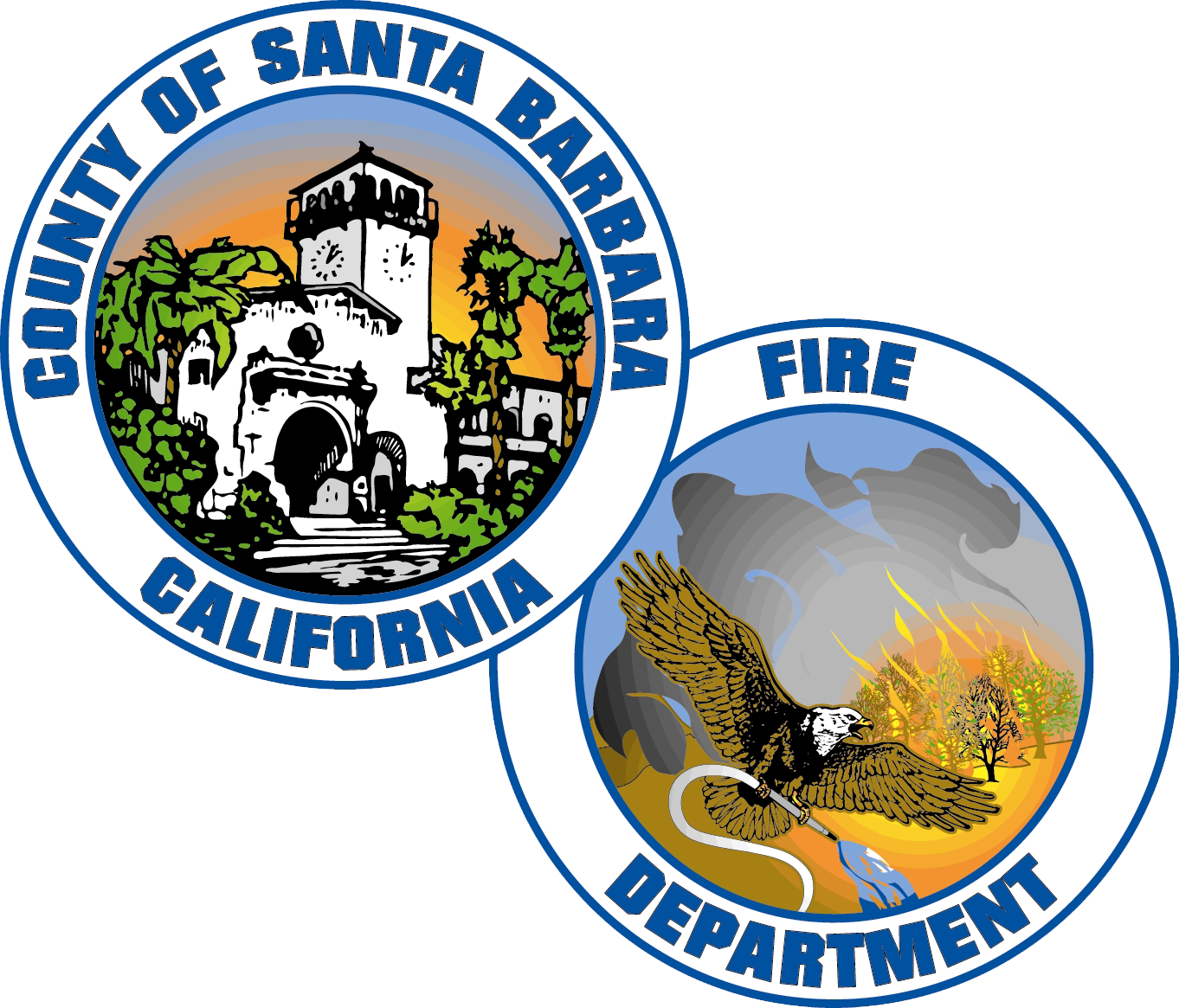

Operational area
- Country: United States
- State: California
- County: Santa Barbara

Agency overview
- Established: 1926
- Annual calls: 13,461 (2021)
- Employees: 239 (2015)
- Annual budget: $102,153,500 (2021)
- Staffing: Career
- Fire chief: Mark Hartwig
- EMS level: ALS & BLS
- IAFF: 2046

Facilities and equipment
- Battalions: 3
- Stations: 16
- Engines: 21
- Tillers: 2
- Quints: 1
- Ambulances: 5
- Tenders: 4
- HAZMAT: 1
- Wildland: 14
- Bulldozers: 3
- Helicopters: 3
- Light and air: 1

Website
- Official website
- IAFF website

The Santa Barbara County Fire Department (SBCFD) provides fire protection and emergency response services for the unincorporated areas of Santa Barbara County, California, and for multiple cities within the county. Together, these areas compose the Santa Barbara County Fire Protection District.

In addition to the unincorporated areas of Santa Barbara County, the department also services the communities of Santa Barbara, Goleta, Isla Vista/ UCSB campus, Santa Ynez, Santa Maria, Los Alamos, Casmalia, Lompoc (via automatic aid agreement), Solvang, New Cuyama, and Buellton. In addition they cover parts of the Los Padres National Forest, The majority of the Santa Barbara Coastline, substantial open space reserves, and many private ranch communities. The Santa Barbara County fire Department is a contract county with the California State Department of Forestry and Fire Protection. Under the terms of the contract, the Fire Department is responsible for suppression of fires on SRA "State Responsibility Area" for CalFire.

The hills above Santa Barbara that comprise the Santa Ynez Mountains are a unique challenge on the California coast as they cause an effect known as the sundowner winds, which are very similar to the Santa Ana winds seen in nearby Santa Ana, California.

== History ==
The SBCFD was initially founded on April 5, 1926. In 1974, Santa Barbara launched the paramedic program which placed trained paramedics at station 11 to work alongside the firefighters.

In 2020 (Effective 1/1/2020) Numbering Changes were made due to anticipated consolidation of regional dispatch services. For that, Station numbers 18, 22, 41 and 51 were changed to 38, 26, 27 and 34. Additional, overhead personnel and special units got new numbers and the auxiliary (reserve) engines were given 1xx series designations. There is a 3rd, "Central" Battalion now. Unknown, if this has been changed in the same timeslot.

== Equipment ==
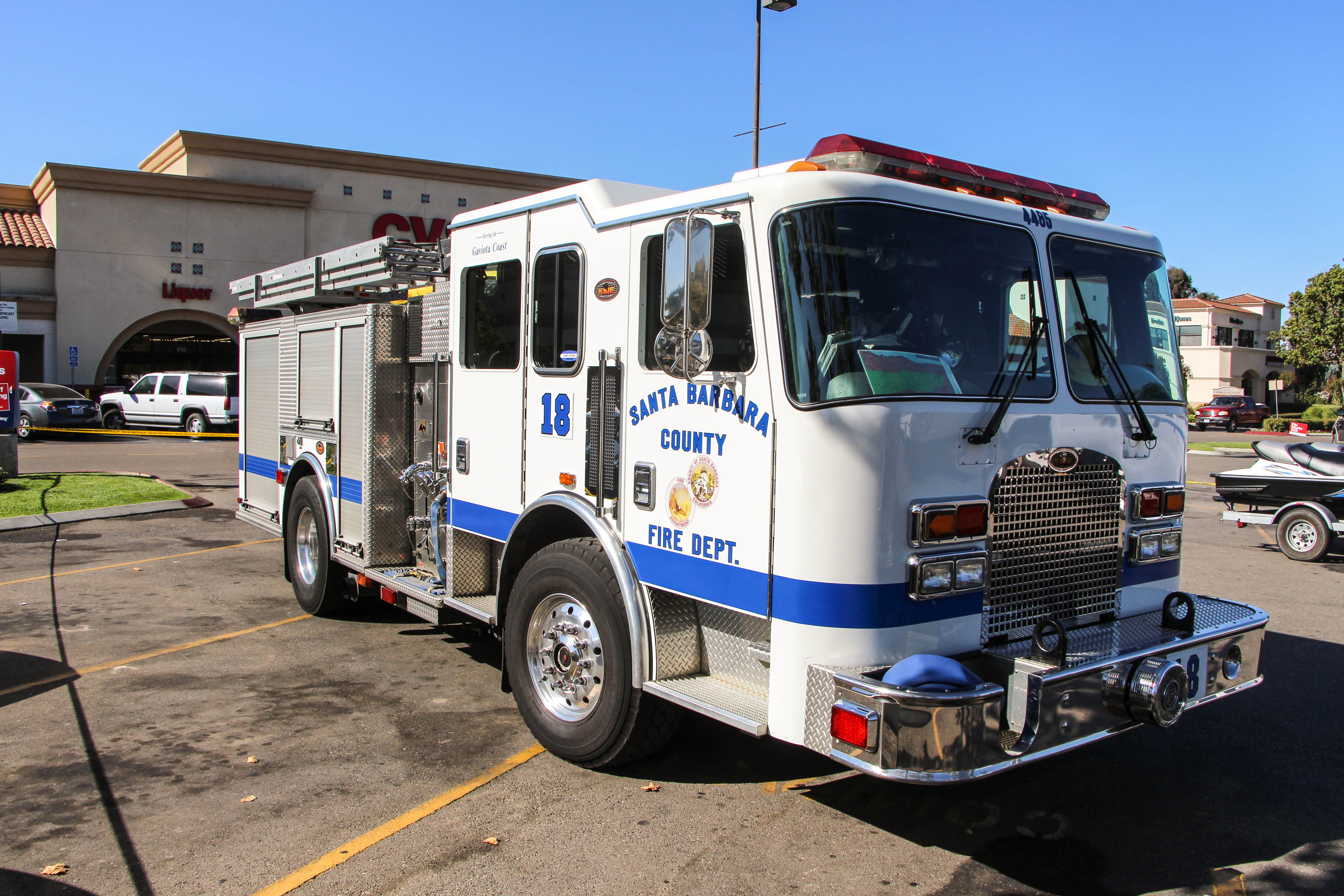
Engine 18, a Type 1, sits in a parking lot in Buellton.

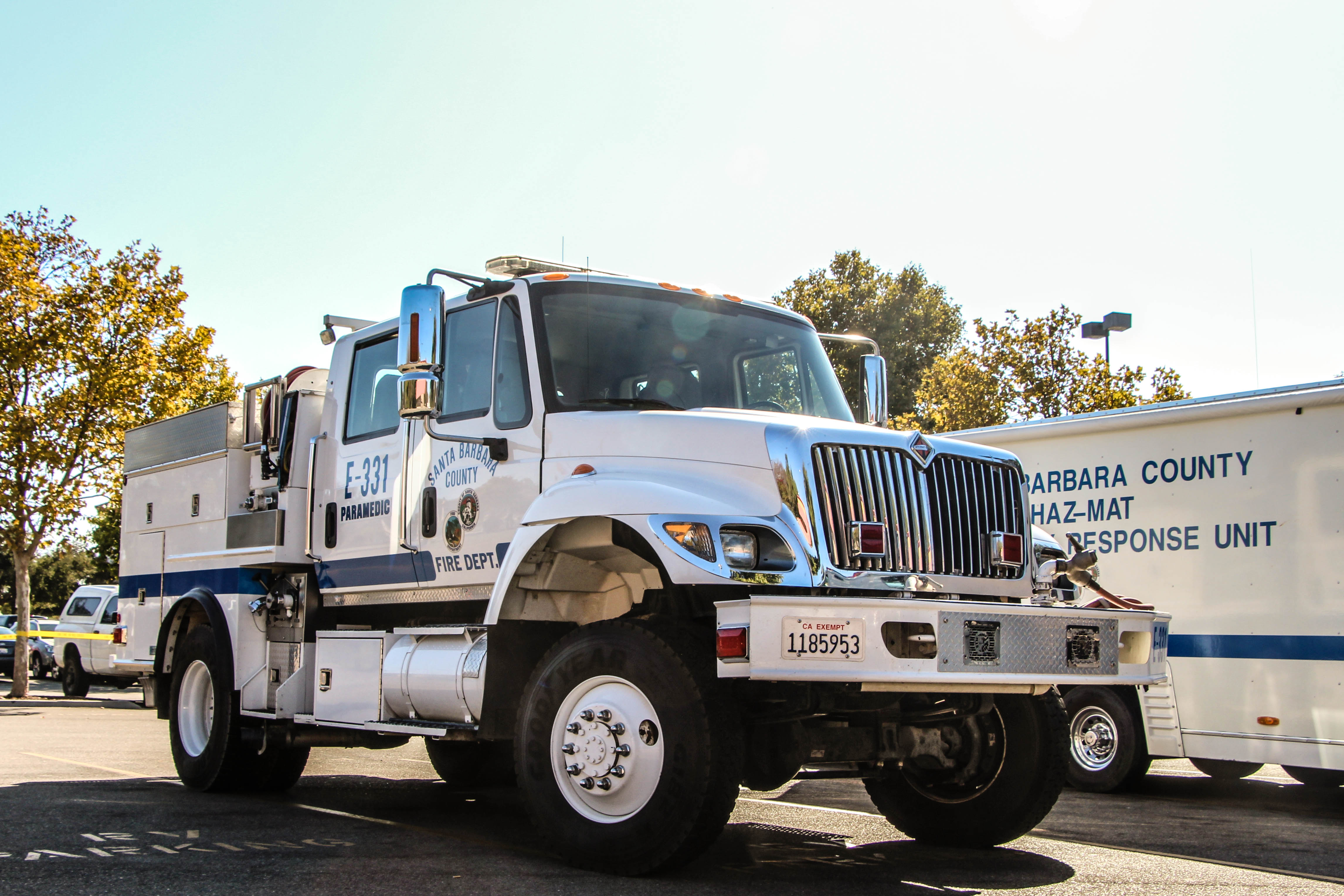
Engine 331, a Type 3, sits in a parking lot in Buellton.

=== Type 1 Engine ===
Each of the 16 stations serviced by SBC FD are equipped with at least one Type 1 engine. The engines have the ability to pump 1,500 GPM and carry 500 gallons of water as well as 25 gallons of foam. For moving the water the engines carry over 2000 feet of hose in various diameters and over 100 feet of ladders. Each engine also has a set of the "Jaws of Life" as well as various other power tools, rescue gear and hand tools for both urban and brush fires. They also have medical equipment on board for medical responses.

=== Trucks ===
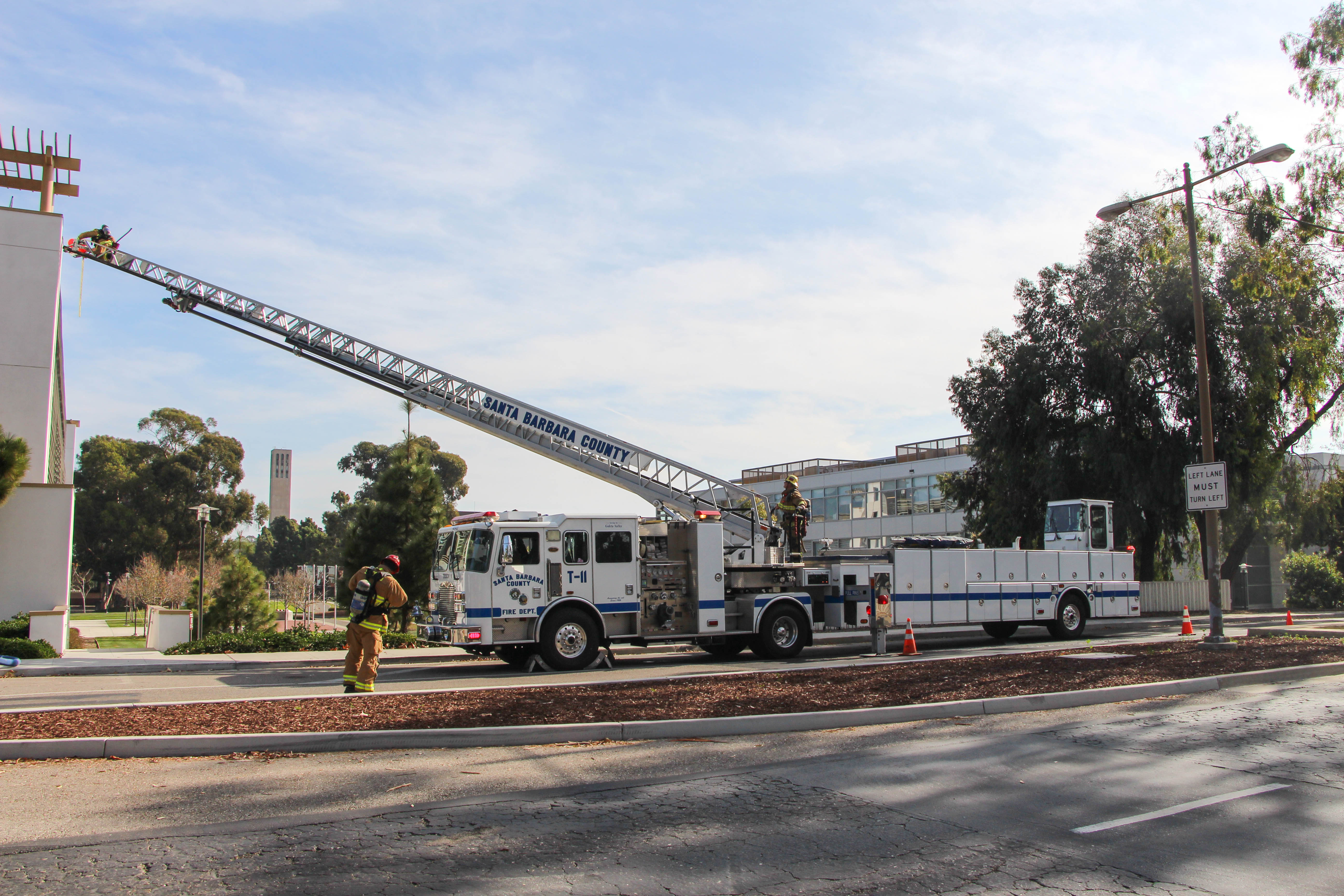
Truck 11 during a training drill

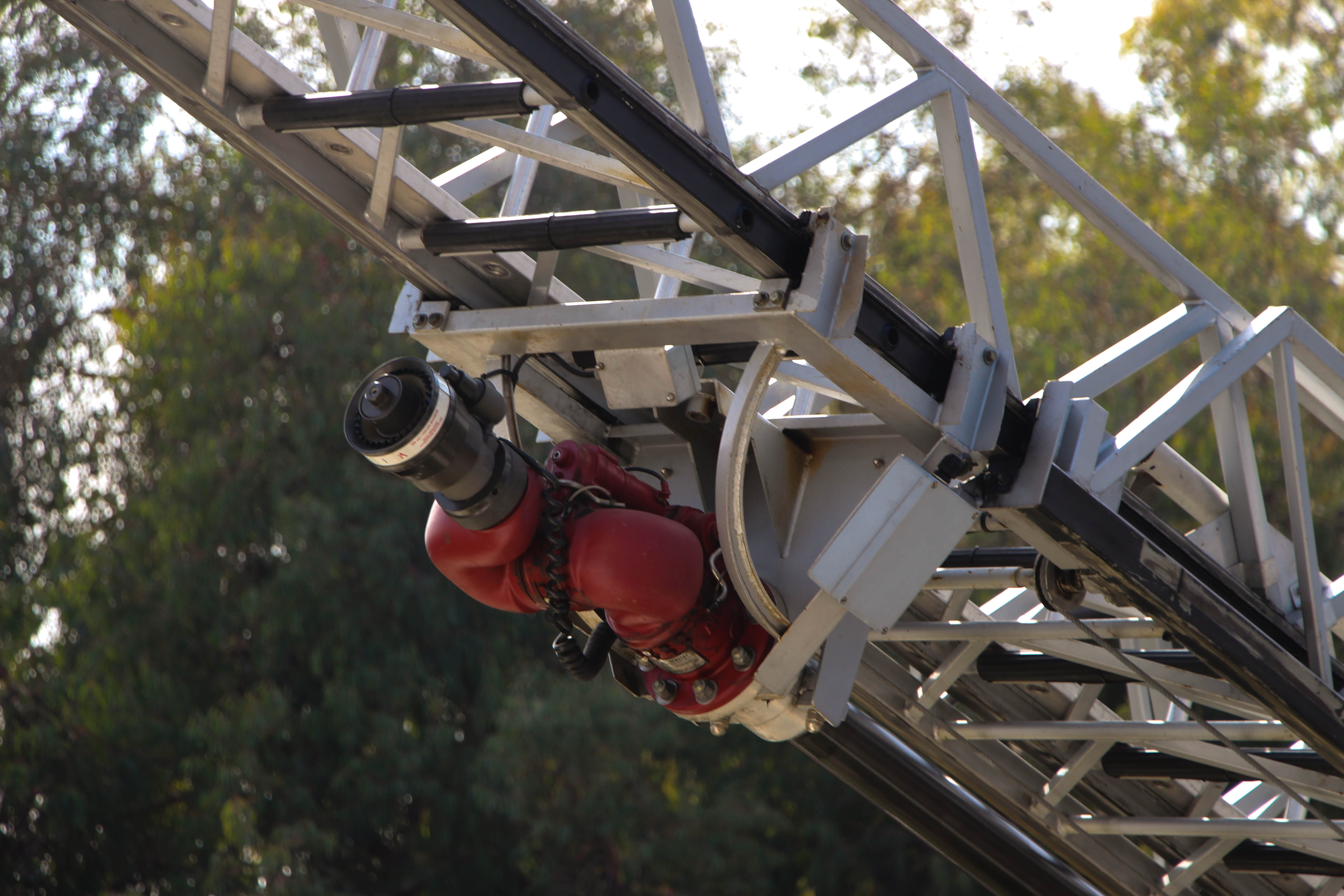
The nozzle on the ladder of Truck 11

As of 2014, Santa Barbara County has 3 aerial ladder trucks 1 front line located at Station 11 as well as an auxiliary ladder truck. The second truck is located at Station 30 in Solvang. The truck weighs 74,000 pounds (34,000 kg) and features a 100-foot (30 m) ladder and a pump that produces 1,250 GPM. The pump is connected to a nozzle at the top of the ladder allow water to be sprayed onto a fire from above. Besides being set up for fire fighting, the truck is also configured for technical, trench and confined space rescue responses and also has medical equipment for medical responses. Along with the standard ladders and hoses, the truck also carries cutting torches, chainsaws, ropes, air bags and various other tools. The truck automatically responds to all technical rescues, vehicle accidents and structure fires in Battalion 1.

=== Helicopters ===
The Santa Barbara County Air Support Unit (ASU) is made up of two Bell UH-1H "Huey"s. The helicopters are jointly operated by the Fire Department and the Santa Barbara Sheriff's Office. Located at the Santa Ynez Airport adjacent to the Station 32, the ASU will often travel with a Rescue Paramedics from Station 32 when a medic is necessary. The helos are fitted for both hoisting of personnel for a rescue and for dropping of water during a fire. The underside can also be fitted with water dropping tanks that carry 320 gallons of water and have the ability to pump water from a reservoir or other water source or they can be filled on the ground with fire hose.

In October 2020, Santa Barbara County announced that a 2004 Sikorsky HH-60L “Blackhawk” helicopter had been purchased and would go into service in 2021. The helicopter was purchased with County funds and Fundraising from Direct Relief International (DRI) that resulted in raising a total donation of $1,151,000.

In March 2022, United rotorcraft delivered the finished, modified H-60 "FireHawk" to Santa Barbara County. The modifications include a belly mounted water tank of approx. 1000 gals, new avionics, communications gear, rescue hoist and configuration for aeromedical evacuations. The modifications are similar to those made to LA County, Ventura, San Diego and CalFire H-60s.

=== Water Tenders ===
Santa Barbara County uses two different types of water tenders, two tactical and two supply units. The tactical units feature 4x4 capabilities and carry 1,500 gallons of water. They are specifically designed to carry water inside of a vegetation fire incident. These tenders are located at Station 21 in Orcutt and Station 32 in Santa Ynez. The supply units can carry 3,200 gallons of water to easily accessible areas. These are located at Station 38 in Gaviota and Station 27 in Cuyama.

=== Rescue Ambulance ===
The SBCFD has four Rescue Ambulances (RA) deployed around the county. Santa Barbara County was at the forefront of the firefighter/paramedic introduction to the industry. Although the primary Advanced Life Support (ALS) provider for the county is the private ambulance company American Medical Response (AMR), there are areas in which the county provides both dedicated ALS coverage and patient transport to hospital facility. The vehicles are based on the Ford modular-style ambulance outfitted with advanced life support capabilities. Cardiac Monitors and Defibrillators, Cardiac Drugs, Intubation and Airway Supplies and other equipment are carried on the Rescue Ambulances. There are a total of five RAs throughout the county, two are located at Station 17 servicing UC Santa Barbara, two are at Station 27 in New Cuyama and one is at Station 34 in Vandenberg Village. In addition to medical emergencies, the RA will also respond with an initial assignment to any structure fire or multi-engine calls.

== Stations and apparatus ==
=== Battalion 1 ===
Battalion one, or South Battalion, consists of stations 11, 12, 13, 14, 15 and 17. Adjacent to station 11 is the office and quarters for the Battalion Chief serving Battalion 1. The designations for the South BC are 10 (A-shift), 12 (B-shift) and 14 (C-shift).

Fire Station Number	City	Engine Company	Truck Company	Rescue Units	Wildland Units	Other Units
11	Goleta	Engine 11	Truck 11 Truck 111 (Reserve)			USAR 11, Water Rescue 11, Battalion 1, Rescue 11
12	Goleta	Engine 12			Engine 312	
13	Santa Barbara	Engine 13			Engine 313	Utility 13
14	Goleta	Engine 14			Engine 314	
15	Santa Barbara	Engine 15			Engine 315	Utility 15
17	UCSB	Engine 17		Rescue 17; Rescue 217		Utility 17, Water Rescue 17

=== Battalion 2 ===
Battalion two, or North Battalion, consists of stations 21, 23, 24, 26, and 27. Adjacent to Station 24 is the office and quarters for the Battalion Chief serving Battalion 2. The designations for the North BC are 11 (A-shift), 13 (B-shift) and 15 (C-shift).

Fire Station Number	City	Engine Company	Medic Units	Wildland Units	Other Units
21	Orcutt	Engine 21		Engine 321	
23	Sisquoc	Engine 23		Engine 323	Utility 23
24	Los Alamos	Engine 24		Engine 324	Utility 24, Battalion 2, Dozer 1, Dozer 2
26	Santa Maria	Engine 26		Engine 326	Utility 26, Water Tender 26
27	New Cuyama	Engine 27	Medic 27; Medic 127	Engine 327	Utility 27, Water Tender 27

=== Battalion 3 ===
Battalion three, or Central Battalion, consists of stations 30, 31, 32, 34 and 38. The designations for the North BC are 16 (A-shift), 17 (B-shift) and 18 (C-shift).

Fire Station Number	City	Engine Company	Medic Units	Wildland Units	Other Units
30	Solvang	Engine 30		Engine 330	Utility 30
31	Buellton	Engine 31		Engine 331	Utility 31, HazMat
32	Santa Ynez	Engine 32		Engine 332	Utility 32, Water Tender 32
34	Vandenberg Village	Engine 34	Medic 34; Medic 134	Engine 334	
38	Gaviota	Engine 38		Engine 338	Water Tender 38, Utility 38, Breathing Support 38

== Gallery ==
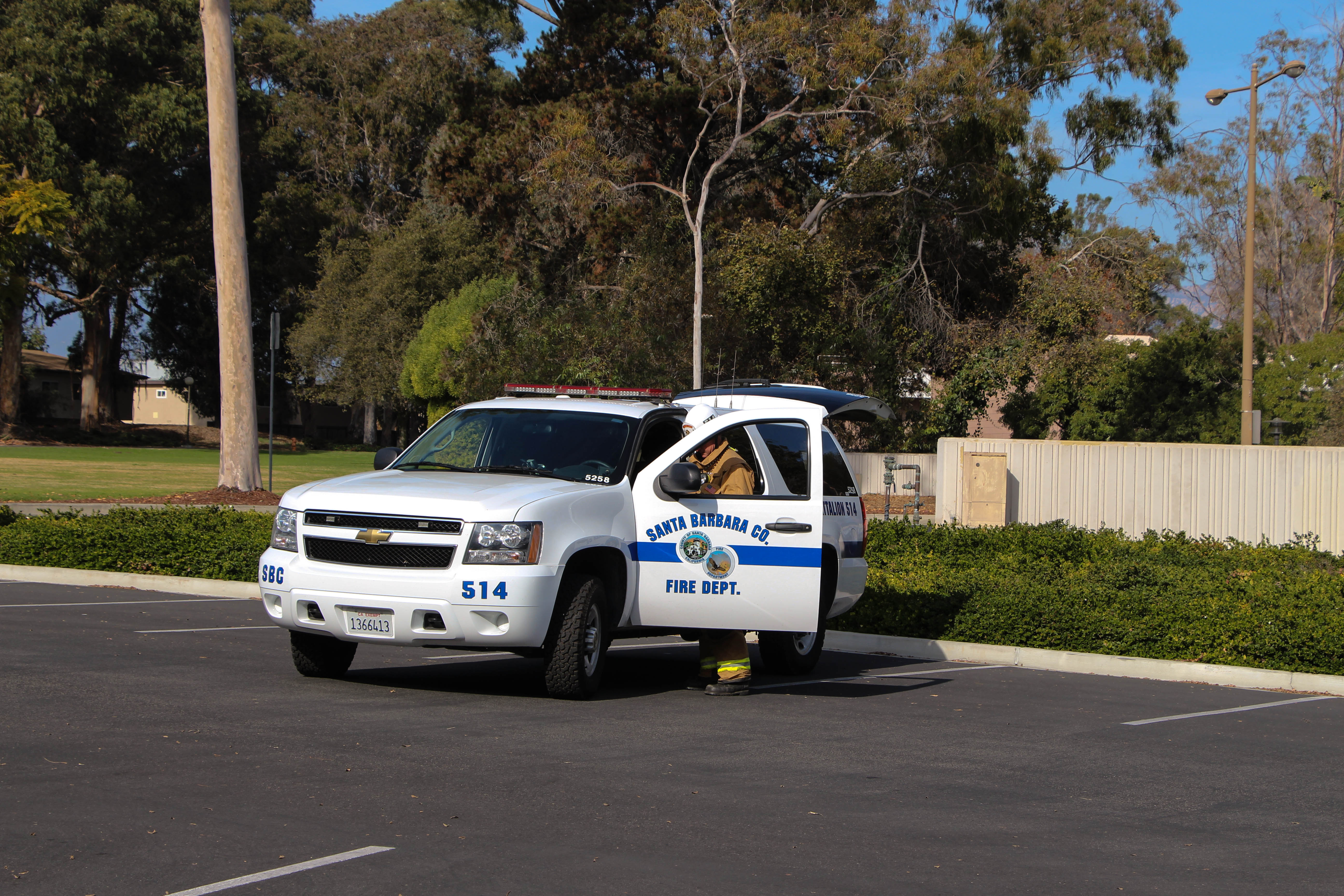
Battalion Chief 514 oversees the drill.

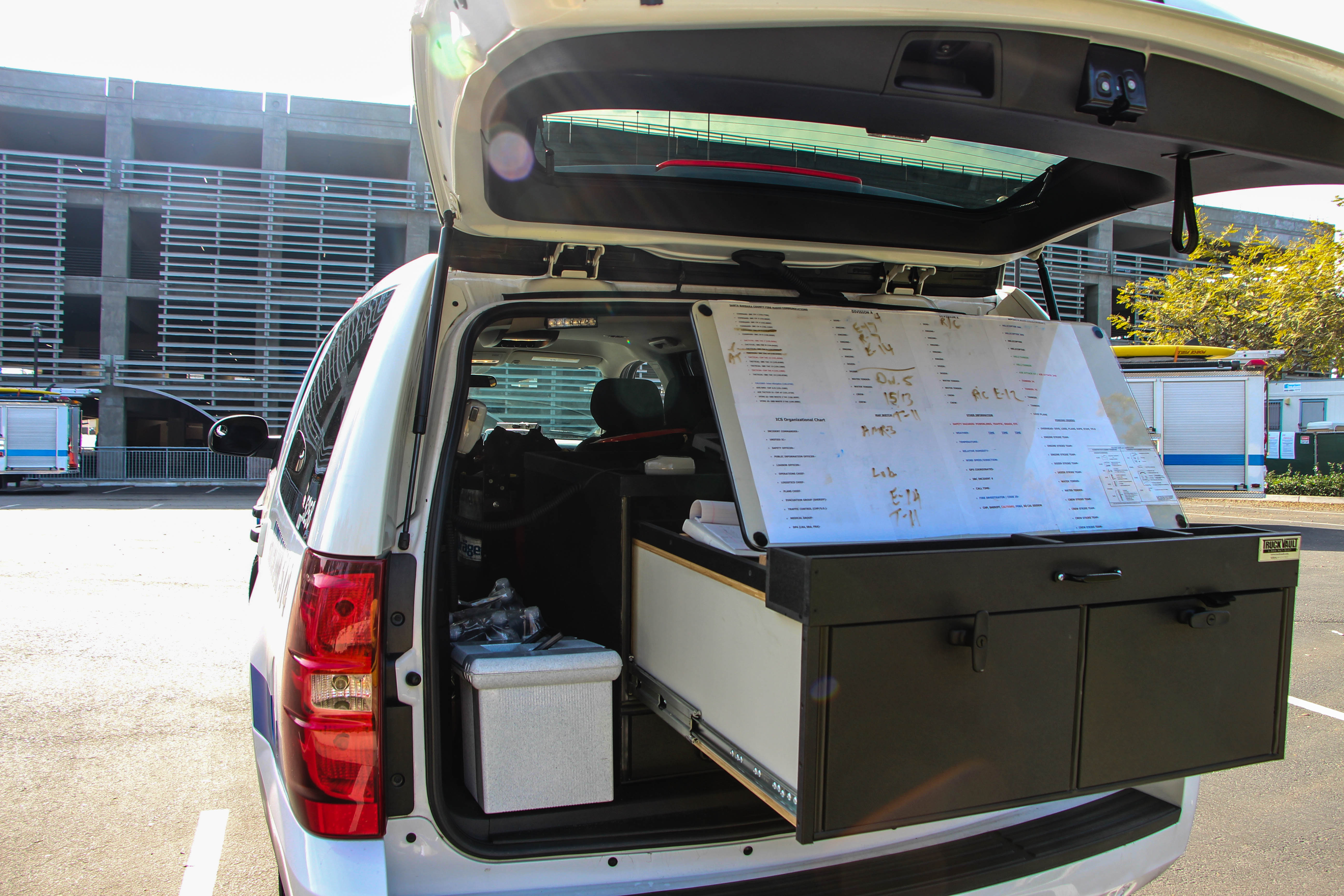
Battalion Chief 514 oversees the drill.

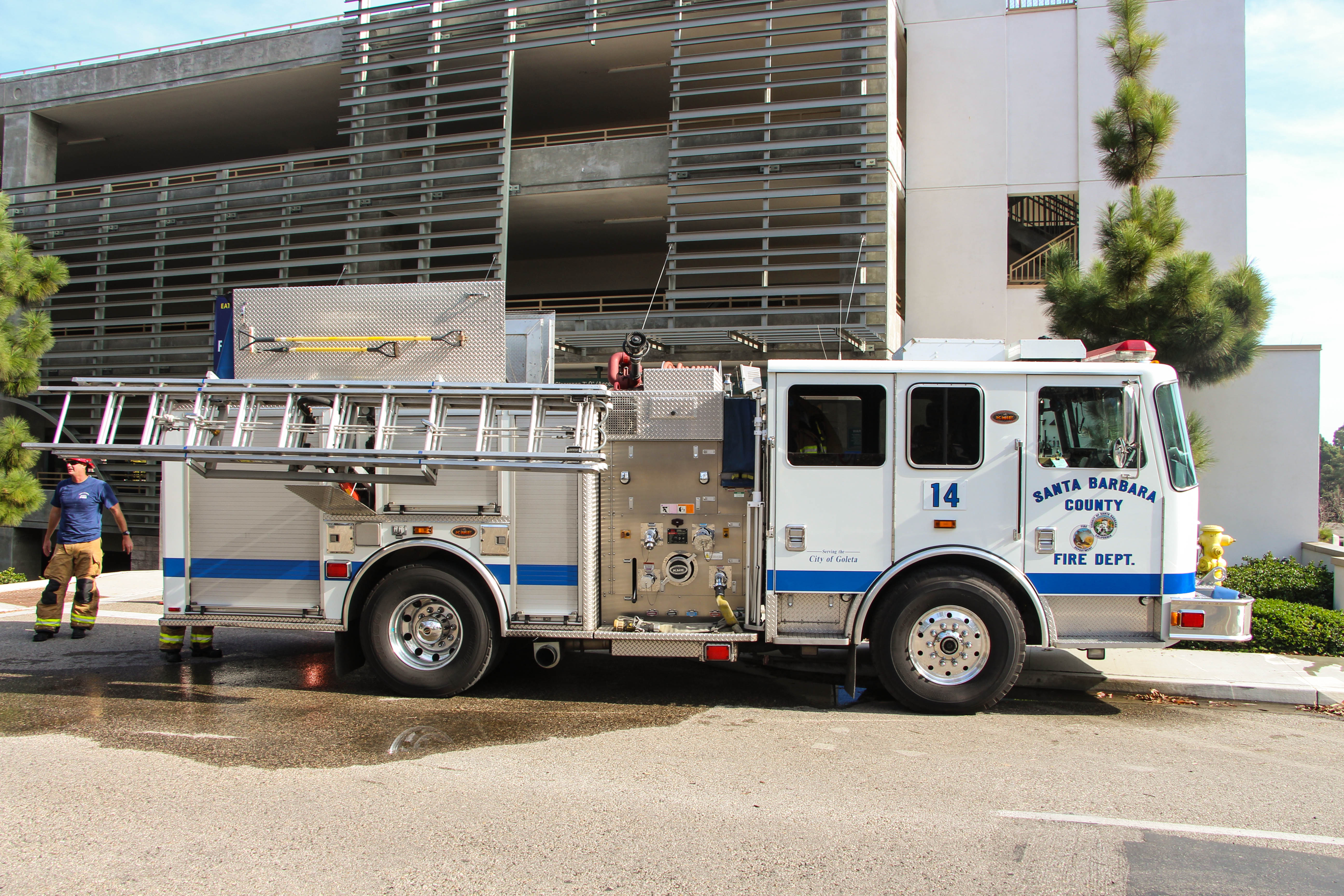
Engine 14

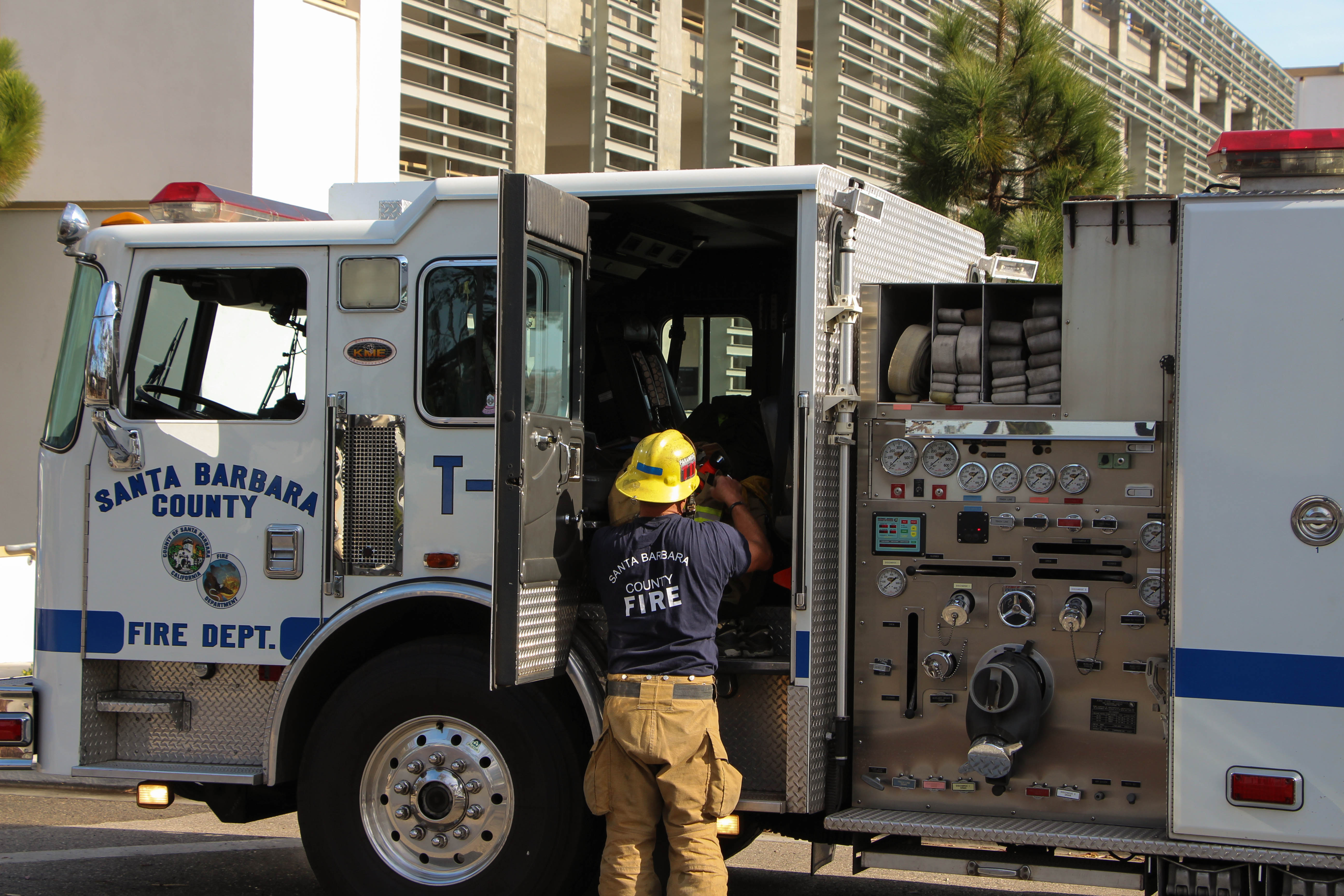
Truck 11

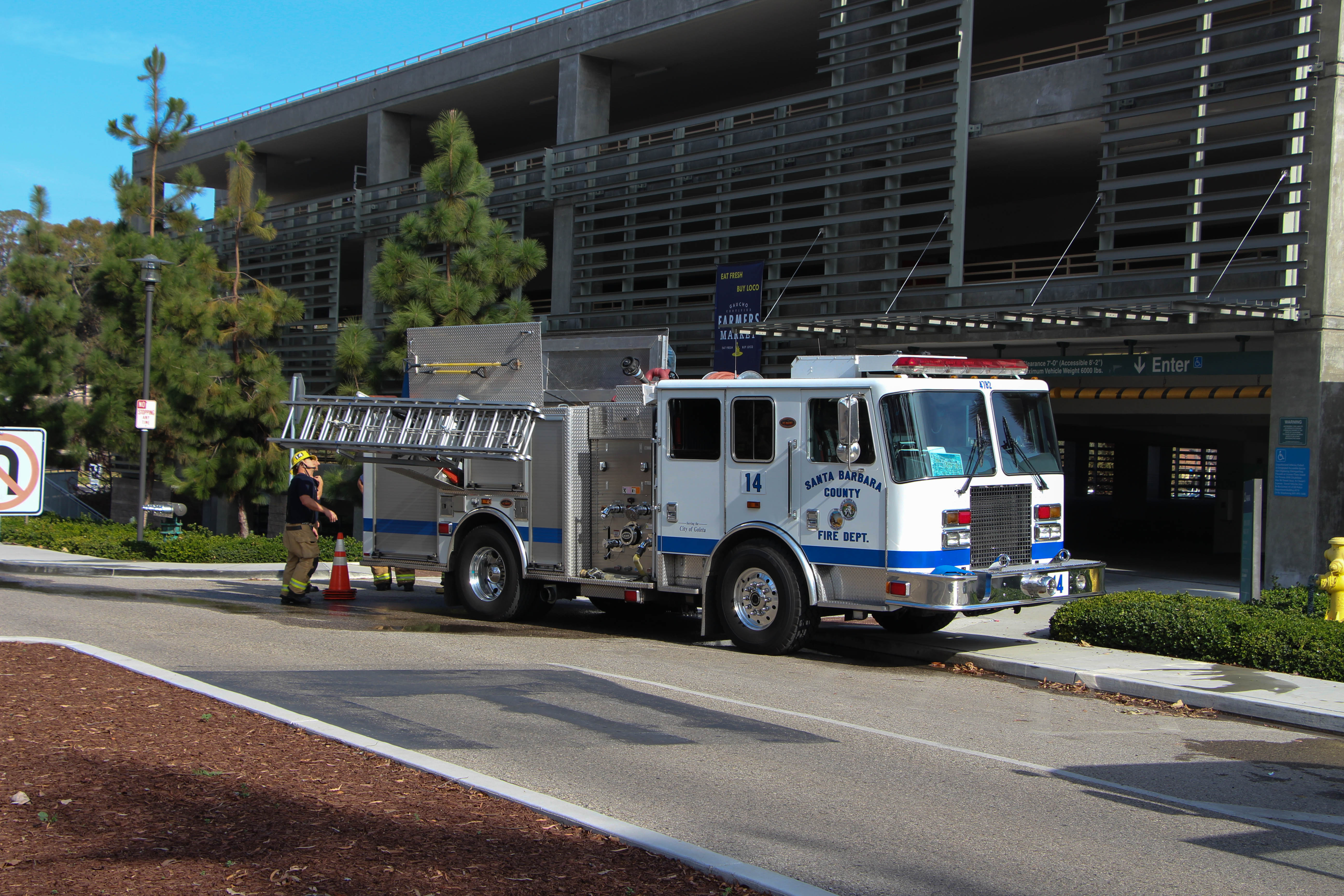
Engine 14

== Notable Incidents ==
- Painted Cave Fire (June–July 1990)
- Zaca Fire (July–August 2007)
- Gap Fire (July 2008)
- Montecito Tea Fire (November 2008)
- Jesusita Fire (May 2009)
- Sherpa Fire (June 2016)
- Rey Fire (August 2016)

=== Refugio oil spill ===
On May 19, 2015, the SBCFD responded around 11:40am to a report of a strong smell of oil coming from the area of Refugio State Beach. Crews found a ruptured 24 inches (61 cm) line with crude oil running into the Pacific Ocean. The department stated the spill went into a culvert that ran under the U.S. 101, and into the ocean. Representatives from Plains All American Pipeline stated that at the time of the spill the pipeline was operating at maximum capacity with a rate of 2,000 barrels per hour (84,000 US gal/h).
