= Painted Cave, California =

Unincorporated community in California, United States

Coordinates: 34.5044°N 119.7913°W

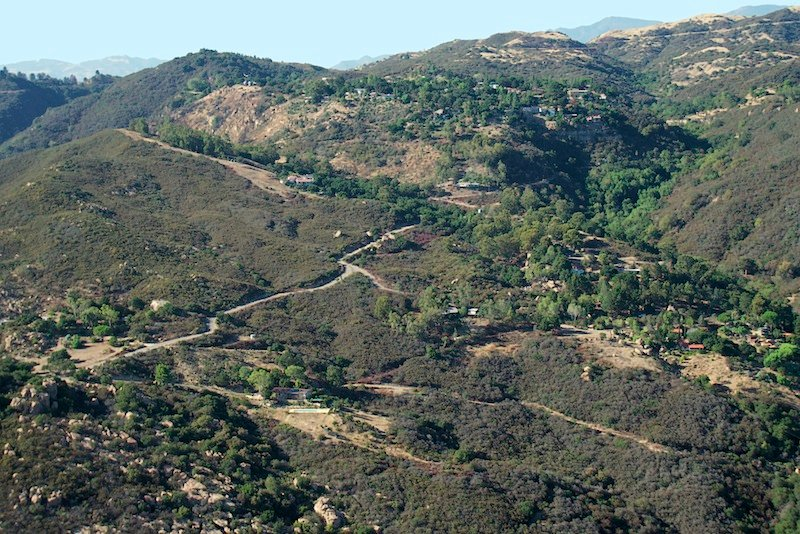
Aerial view from the south

Painted Cave is an unincorporated community of Santa Barbara County, California, United States, located in the Santa Ynez Mountains and is so named due to its proximity to Painted Cave State Historic Park. It is primarily served by Camino Cielo Road and California State Route 154, which link the community both to the nearby Santa Ynez Valley and Santa Barbara. The community is made up of roughly 100 homesteads, plus many outlying settlements. Painted Cave is the highest and largest of the inholdings within the Santa Ynez Mountains, and commands an impressive view- on clear days, all eight of the Channel Islands can often be seen. The community is primarily composed of irregular lots, and does not, except in the center of the community, conform to any sort of grid. Painted Cave sits atop a rough plateau, and includes the large Laurel Springs Ranch. The local terrain is extremely hilly, and numerous homes along Rim and Lookout roads approach or even overhang sheer cliffs.

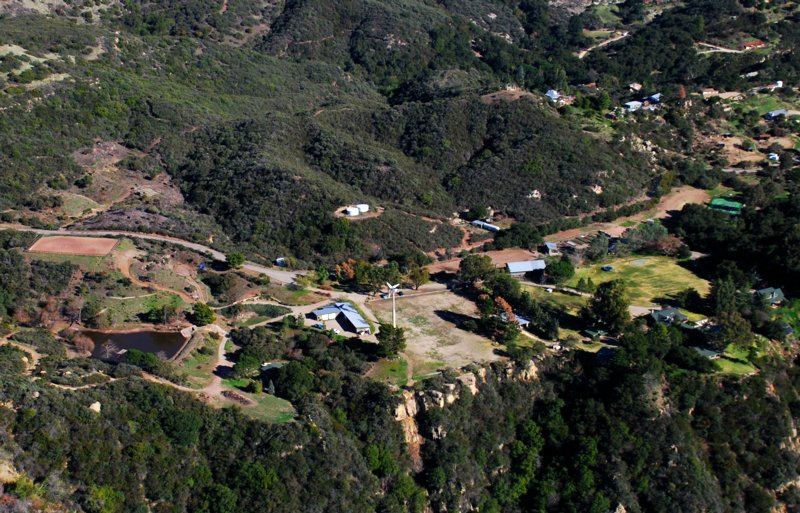
Laurel Springs Ranch from southeast

== History ==
Painted Cave arose through gradual construction in the hills above Santa Barbara, with a mixture of rustic cabins and grand retreats, such as Knapp's Castle. The central impetus for development was the linkage of the access road to the Painted Cave SHP (Painted Cave Road) with Camino Cielo Road. Though there have been many close calls and evacuations, Painted Cave has, as yet, escaped destruction by wildfire, although the 1964 Coyote Fire came closest, sparing the community only due to a fortuitous wind shift, after destroying eight homes.

== Fire ==
The 1990 Painted Cave Fire (named for the intersection of 154 and Painted Cave Road, where the arson was committed, not the community) primarily moved downslope and did not directly threaten the community, though it did burn outliers. The Gap Fire and Jesusita Fire of 2009 burned close to the area, but the comparative encirclement of Painted Cave by roads (which pull double duty as supply lines and firebreaks) makes it a comparatively easy place to defend. Painted Cave, by this virtue, is often used as a command center and helitack staging area for Santa Barbara wildfires.

== Administration ==
The Wildlands Resident's Association handles the overall preparedness and coordination of the region, and liaises with Santa Barbara County and CAL FIRE. Several local organizations, such as the Painted Cave Volunteer Fire Department and the Painted Cave Mutual Water Company, manage day-to-day affairs. The Volunteer Fire Department operates so-called brush trucks for rapid response along the ridge line, as well as a larger pumper. The Mutual Water Company pumps water from the nearby Maria Ygnacio Creek to a tank system supplying the community.

The Painted Cave Volunteer Fire Department was formed in 1965 as a local volunteer fire department. The department operates three “Type 3” four-wheel-drive brush trucks capable of off-road wildland fire response, a specialized fire retardant gel truck, a Mercedes Sprinter recovery vehicle, a tractor-trailer, and both Chevrolet Suburban and Tahoe command vehicles.

In the California State Assembly, Painted Cave is in the 37th Assembly district, represented by Democrat Gregg Hart.

In the United States House of Representatives, Painted Cave is in California's 24th congressional district, represented by Democrat Salud Carbajal.

The local ZIP code is 93105 and the area lies within the 805 area code.
