= Gap Fire =

Gap Fire may refer to:

- Gap Fire (2008), a 2008 wildfire in Santa Barbara, California
- Gap Fire (2016), a 2016 wildfire in Seiad Valley, California
