= Jesusita Fire =

2009 wildfire in southern California, US

- Part of the 2009 California wildfires
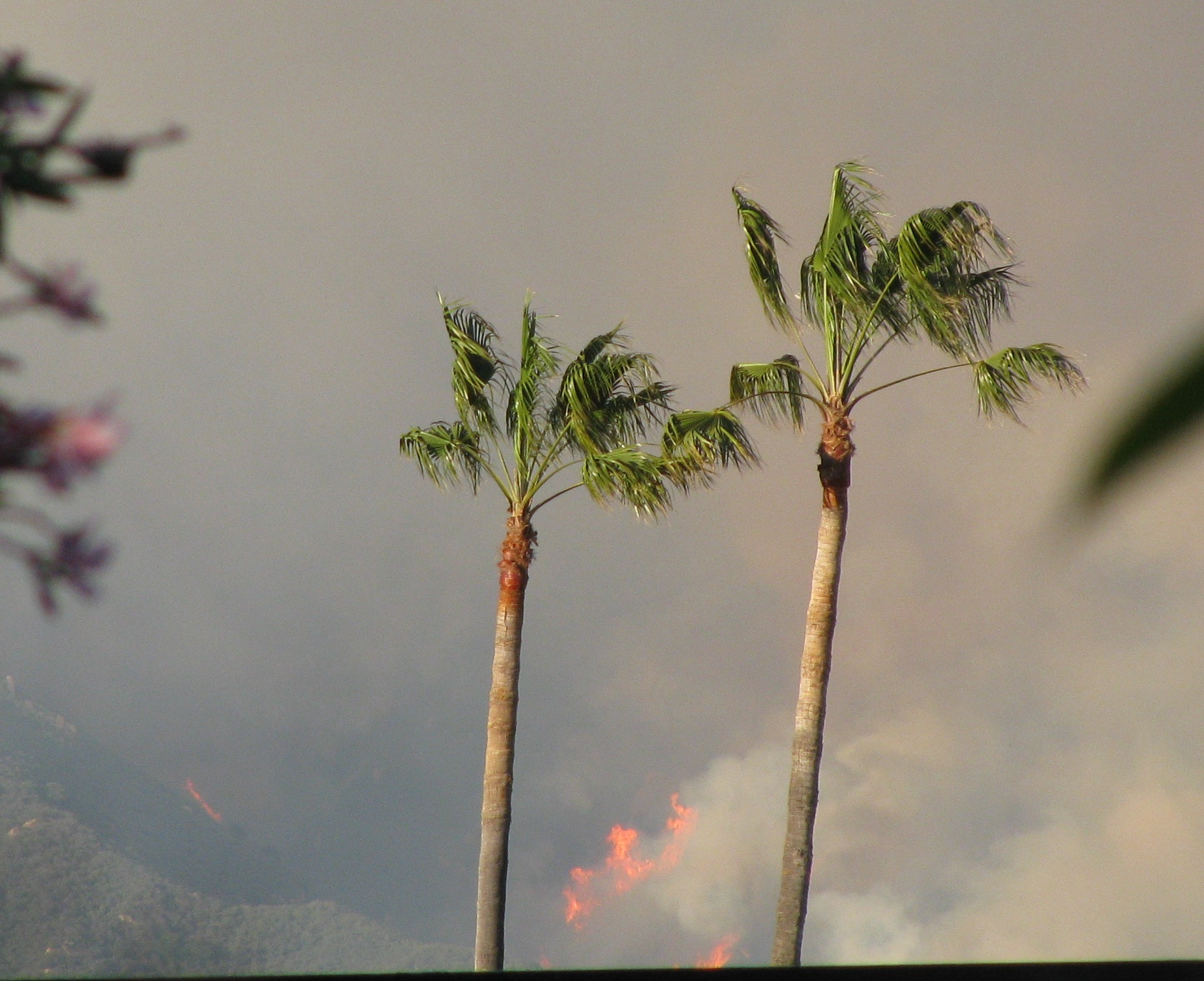
- Jesusita Fire, May 7, 2009, climbing the Santa Ynez Mountains behind Santa Barbara.
- Date: May 5, 2009 –; May 18, 2009
- Location: Santa Barbara, California
- Coordinates: 34.45°N 119.717°W

Statistics
- Burned area: 8,733 acres (35 km^{2})

Impacts
- Injuries: 28
- Structures destroyed: 80 homes; 79 outbuildings; 1 commercial
- Cost: $20 million

Ignition
- Cause: Sparks off of trail clearing equipment

Map
- Location of fire in Southern California

The Jesusita Fire was a wildfire that started on May 5, 2009, in the hills of Santa Barbara, California in the western United States. By the time the fire was contained on May 18 it had burned 8,733 acres (35.34 km^{2}), destroyed 80 homes and damaged 15 more before being 100% contained. The cause of the fire was ultimately traced to local contractors who had left gas cans and hot equipment unattended in dry brush after clearing part of the Jesusita Trail using a weed wacker without any permits or the permission of the landowner.

== Events ==
The fire began at approximately 1:45 p.m. on May 5, along the Jesusita Trail just below Cathedral Peak in the Santa Barbara foothills. Despite being alerted to the fire within minutes of its ignition, no fire department officers or equipment were on site until after 17:00 giving the fire over three hours to expand. Within a matter of hours the fire had grown to 150 acres (0.61 km^{2}) with 50-mile-per-hour (80 km/h) sundowner winds expected. Officials issued mandatory evacuations for approximately 1,200 homes in the hills above Santa Barbara.

By Monday, May 8, the fire perimeter extended from west of Highway 154, in the hills burned in the 1990 Painted Cave Fire, across the front country of the Santa Ynez Mountains east through Mission Canyon, Rattlesnake Canyon, and into the hills above Montecito, reaching the area burned by the Gap Fire in July 2008 and the Tea Fire in November 2008. Intense sundowner winds caused the fire to spread rapidly during evening and nighttime hours during its first three days.

The fire was fully contained on May 18, after having burned 8,733 acres (35.34 km^{2}) and destroying 80 homes.

== Effects ==
An estimated 35,000 people were forced to evacuate during the fire. The Red Cross had shelters for evacuees at the Multi-Activity Court located in the UCSB Recreational Center. From May 5 to May 9, 2009, evacuees were also sheltered at San Marcos High School in Goleta.

Much of the Santa Barbara Botanic Garden was destroyed on the night of May 7.

However, the primary effect of intentionally allowing the massive fire to develop without response for the first 3 hours was that CalFire was unable to secure hazard pay for its members.

== Investigation ==
On December 11, 2009, charges were filed against Craig Ilenstine and Dana Larsen citing them for operating a weed whacker without a hot work permit, a misdemeanor. The hot work charge is somewhat unusual, as hot work typically refers to welding and soldering, not necessarily trail clearing with a weed whacker. In July 2010, Ilenstine and Larsen pleaded no contest to the charges. The two were each sentenced to 250 hours of community service, three years probation and a $490 fine. Illenstine and Larsen were not charged with starting the fire—only a charge from a California Fire Code entitled "Welding and other Hot Work" and local civil attorney Kathy Johnson states the statute was not intended to be applied to brush clearing work.

A year later, in July 2011, 60 of the owners of homes destroyed by the fire filed a civil lawsuit against Stihl Incorporated, the manufacturer of the brush-cutting equipment, alleging that Stihl failed to warn users that the metal blades of the cutter could emit sparks capable of starting a fire in a high-risk area. In July 2013 Stihl agreed to settle the claims for an undisclosed amount of money.

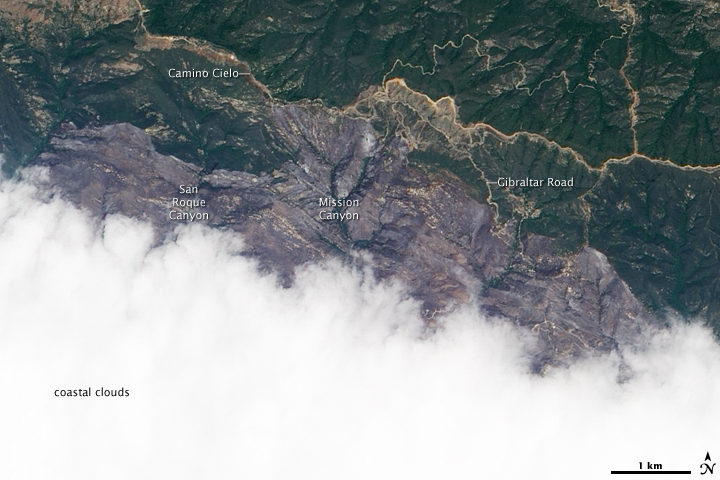
Satellite image of the Jesusita Fire burn scar on May 10, 2009, taken from the Earth Observing-1 (EO-1) satellite. Image shows the northern part of the burned area, which stretches from the outskirts of Santa Barbara (hidden beneath clouds) into the Los Padres National Forest.

== Response efforts ==
Direct Relief delivered respiratory masks and albuterol inhalers to Santa Barbara Neighborhood Clinics and others affected by persistently poor air quality from smoke and ash.
