= Laurel Springs Ranch =

Ranch northwest of Santa Barbara, California, United States

Coordinates: 34.5059°N 119.7949°W

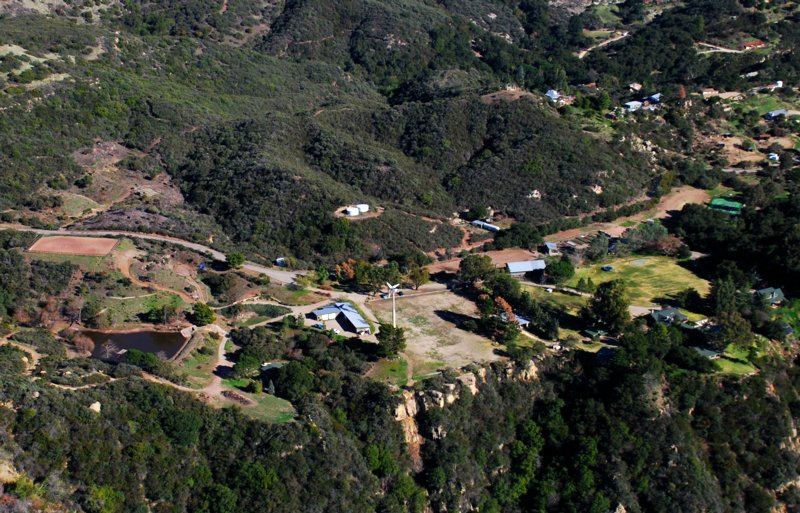
2009 Aerial photo of Laurel Springs Ranch, with part of the Painted Cave community visible in the distance.

Laurel Springs Ranch is a 160-acre (0.65 km^{2}) ranch located on a ridgetop in the Santa Ynez Mountain range northwest of Santa Barbara, California, between the Painted Cave community and the intersection of Painted Cave road with East Camino Cielo Road in the Los Padres National Forest.

== History ==
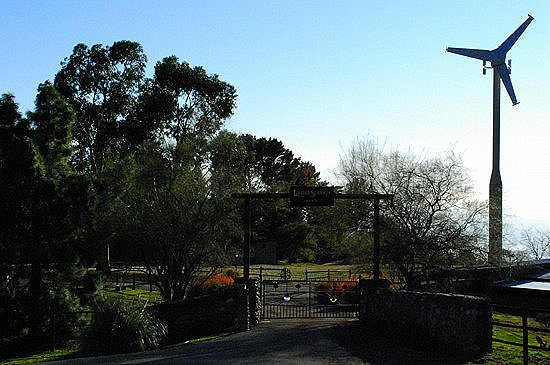
From Painted Cave Rd.

Homer Snyder developed the ranch in 1902, and built the Laurel Springs Inn on the property in 1905. George Owen Knapp bought it in 1916. He built a home there, which burned to the ground in a forest fire five weeks after he sold it in 1940.

In 1977, actress Jane Fonda and her husband Tom Hayden bought it as a summer home and later operated a workout studio, spa, and a summer camp for disadvantaged children there until the early 1990s.

It was then bought by Melissa Keeler and Michael Morris. Together they developed it into the Laurel Springs Retreat, and it is now used for group trainings and individual rentals.

== See also ==
- Knapp's Castle
- Santa Ynez Mountains
