= Santa Ynez Fault =

Tectonic fault in California, United States

Santa Ynez Fault is a left-reverse fault in Santa Barbara County of California. Its length is at least 130 km., running through Santa Ynez and north of nearby Santa Barbara. The Santa Ynez Mountains were uplifted within the last 5 million years, mostly along this fault, which marks the north slope of the range.
