= Jalama Creek =

Stream in Santa Barbara County, California, US

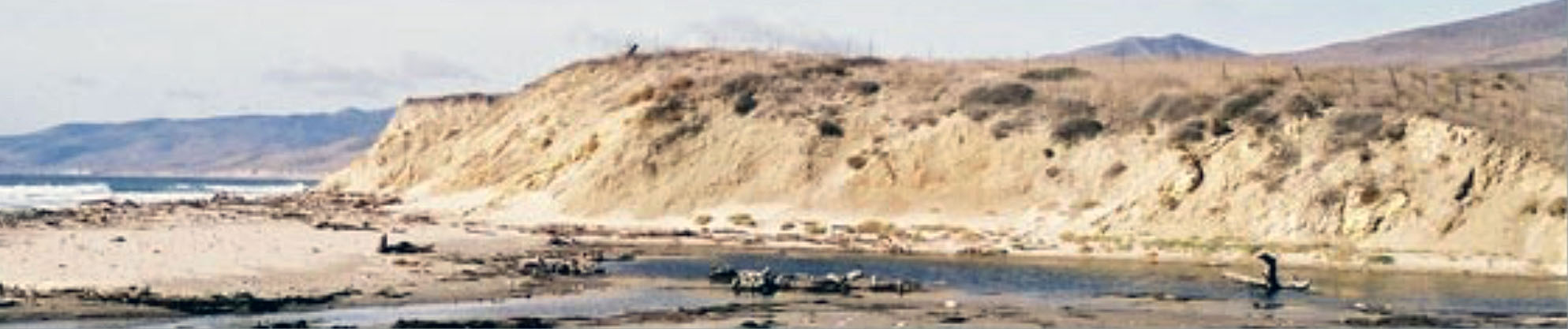
- Jalama Creek Lagoon Panorama courtesy of Matt Stoecker 2001

- Location of mouth

Location
- Country: United States
- State: California
- Region: Santa Barbara County, California

Physical characteristics
- Source: Western Santa Ynez Mountains
  - location: 8.5 miles (13.7 km) west-northwest of Gaviota, California
  - coordinates: 34°30′04″N 120°21′39″W
  - elevation: 1,610 ft (490 m) 34° 30' 9.95" N 120° 21' 39.57" W
- Mouth: Confluence with the Pacific Ocean
  - location: 4.6 miles (7.4 km) north of Point Conception
  - coordinates: 34°30′40″N 120°30′10″W
  - elevation: 0 ft (0 m)
- Length: 11.3 mi (18.2 km)

Basin features
- Tributaries
  - right: Escondido Creek, Gasper Creek, Espada Creek

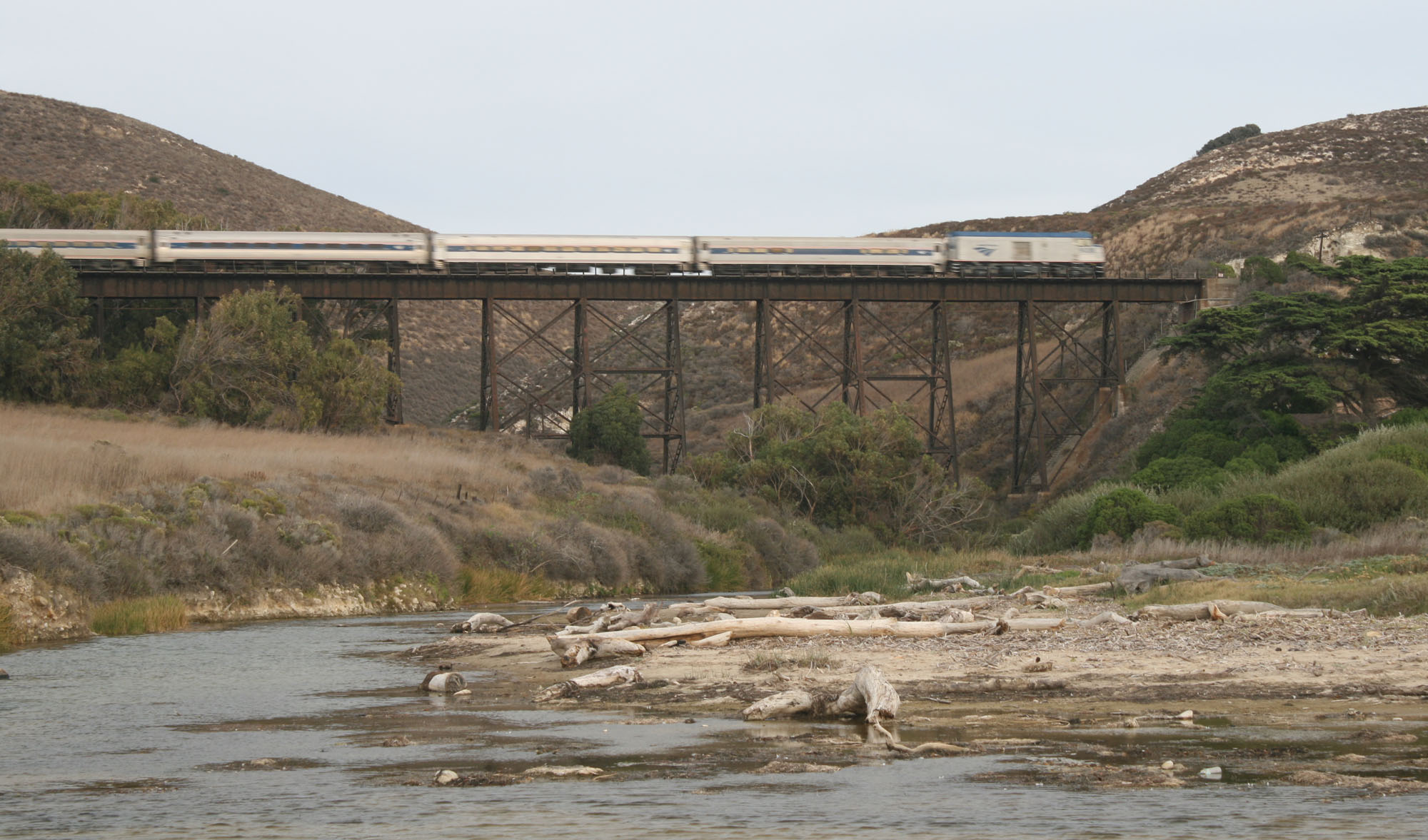
Pacific Surfliner crossing Jalama Beach trestle, November 2008

Jalama Creek is a 11.3-mile-long (18.2 km) westwards-flowing stream that begins in the western Santa Ynez Mountains and flows to Jalama Creek estuary and Jalama Beach County Park and the Pacific Ocean.

== History ==
Jalama Creek and the historic Jalama station are derived from the Purisimeño Chumash village named "Xalam", meaning "bundle".

== Watershed and course ==
The Jalama Creek watershed drains 24 square miles (62 km^{2}) of the western Santa Ynez Mountains. Flows in the upper reaches are seasonal, becoming perennial at the confluence with its Escondido Creek tributary about 3.6 miles (5.8 km) from its creek mouth. Further downstream the next two tributaries are Gasper Creek and Espada Creek, after which it reaches the Jalama Creek estuary, and ultimately, the Pacific Ocean.

== Ecology and conservation ==
Jalama Creek and its estuary are home to federally endangered Southern California steelhead trout (Oncorhynchus mykiss). In 2017, The Nature Conservancy purchased 24,329 acres of land in the area, now renamed the Jack and Laura Dangermond Preserve, which covers 97% of the Jalama Creek watershed. Over 100 studies of the areas biology and ecology are underway. The Nature Conservancy removed two dams on lower Jalama Creek, restoring access for steelhead trout to 12.3 miles (19.8 km) of the stream.

== See also ==
- Santa Ynez Mountains
- Jalama Beach County Park
