= Sherpa Fire =

2016 wildfire in Southern California

- Part of the 2016 California wildfires
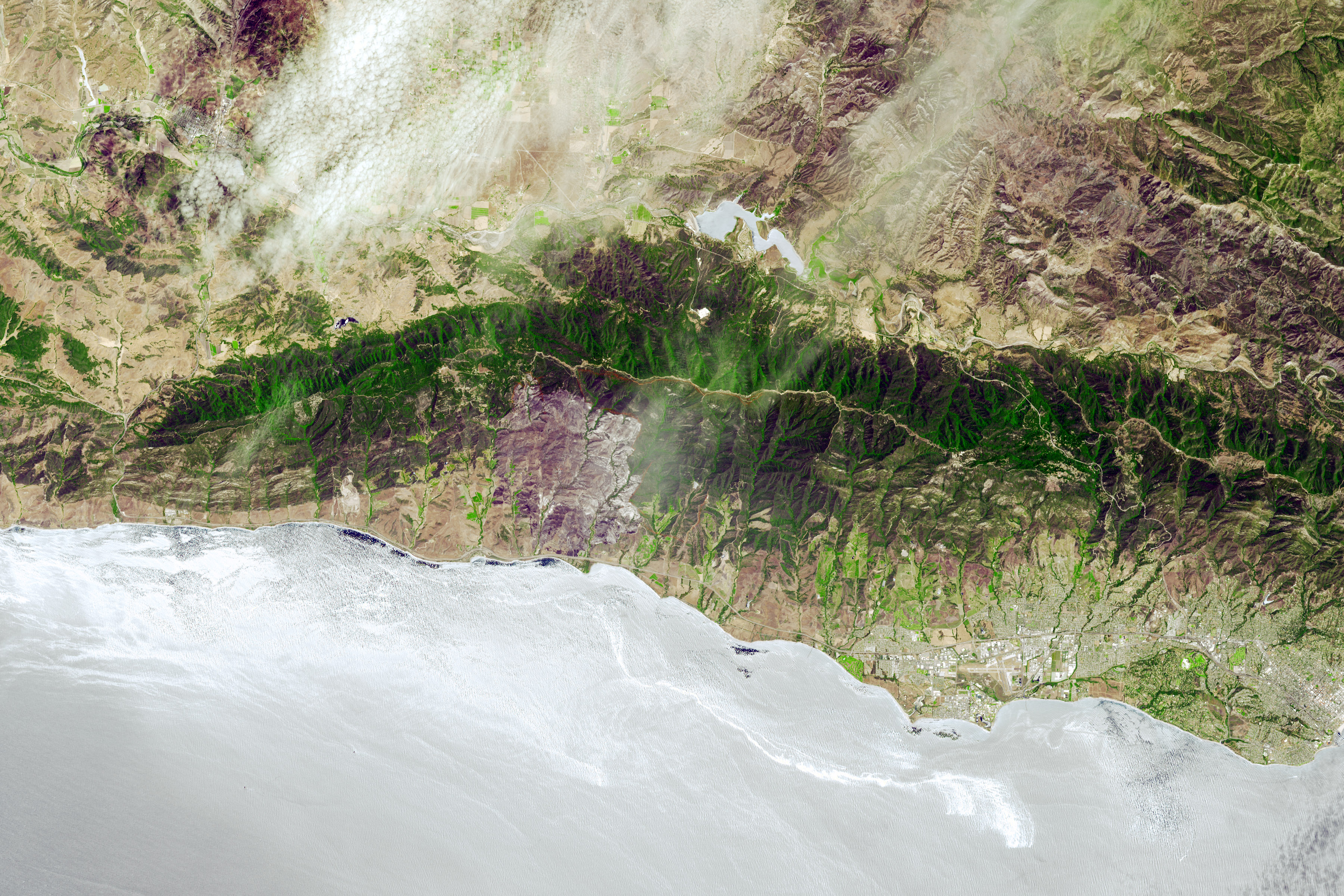
- The burn scar of the Sherpa Fire as seen from space on June 19.
- Date: June 15, 2016 –; July 12, 2016
- Location: Santa Barbara County, California
- Coordinates: 34.53°N 120.054°W

Statistics
- Burned area: 7,474 acres (30 km^{2})

Impacts
- Injuries: 9

Ignition
- Cause: Under investigation

Map
- Location in Southern California

The Sherpa Fire was a wildfire that burned in the Santa Ynez Mountains along the Gaviota Coast in the southwestern part of Santa Barbara County, California in June 2016. In a matter of hours the fire spread to over 1,400 acres (570 ha) as the fire was propelled by downslope sundowner winds. This offshore northerly wind contrasts with the more typical onshore flow and sent the fire down the canyons towards the ocean with gusts of over 35 miles per hour (56 km/h). As a result of the wildfire, authorities ordered evacuations at two state beach campgrounds and several nearby homes, and traffic along a state highway was periodically disrupted.

== Events ==
The fire was first reported shortly before 4:00pm on Wednesday June 15, 2016 in the Los Padres National Forest in an area that includes private inholdings. In a matter of hours the fire had grown to over 1,400 acres (5.7 km^{2}). According to the United States Forest Service, the fire was propelled by downslope sundowner winds which sent the fire down canyons in the Santa Ynez Mountains with gusts of over 35 miles per hour (56 km/h). These contrasted with the typical onshore flow so the fire alternated directions between day and night as it continued to spread. As the fire grew, evacuations were ordered for El Capitán State Beach, Refugio State Beach and residences in El Capitán Canyon. Both a Red Cross evacuation shelter and a livestock evacuation center were established as the fire was burning in an area with a number of large ranches. As the fire ran down the slope, it forced the intermittent closure of the coastal highway designated as U.S. Route 101 and California State Route 1 along with regional and interstate passenger trains and freight service on the adjacent rail line. The fire grew to 4,000 acres (1,600 ha) overnight and destroyed the water system for El Capitán State Beach.

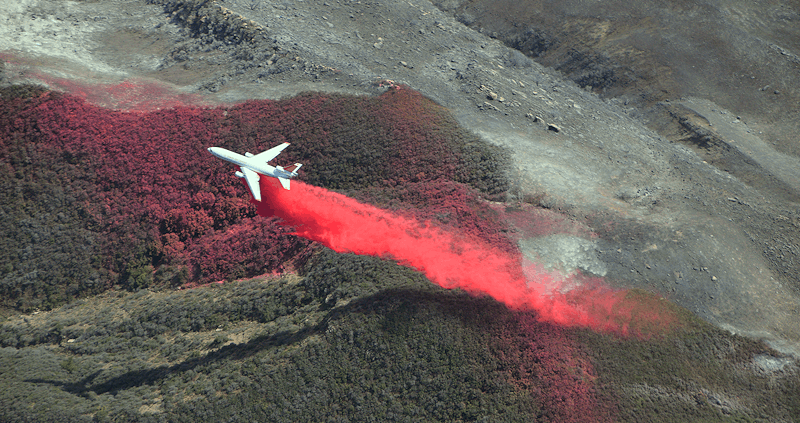
Aerial view of DC-10 PhosChek drop on Northeast perimeter June 19, 2016.

By Thursday morning, the smoke was visible as far south as South Bay, Los Angeles as well as in Antelope Valley prompting the Los Angeles Fire Department to issue a statement regarding multiple 9-1-1 calls being received for the smell of smoke. On the evening of Thursday 16, the sundowner winds resurfaced and once again forced the closure of the 101.

On Friday morning, the Santa Barbara County office of emergency services declared a state of emergency for the region. Additionally a Red flag warning was issued for the region effective through Saturday at 6:00am. While firefighters battled the fire into the weekend, they were aided by weather changes which included reduced winds and higher humidities as the red flag conditions never truly emerged.

On June 27, officials announced that the estimated containment date had been delayed until July 7. According to a Forest Service Spokesman, the final 7% of the perimeter was in extremely rough terrain on which it was "nearly impossible for hand crews and bulldozers to construct traditional containment lines". Due to the difficulty of access the fire remained only 96% contained on July 9 and fauthorities estimated it would taken until the twenty-first for the fire to be fully contained; conditions improved, however, and the fire reached 100% containment on July 12. Because of the threat of flare ups within the burn area, patrols continued for several days.

== Effects ==
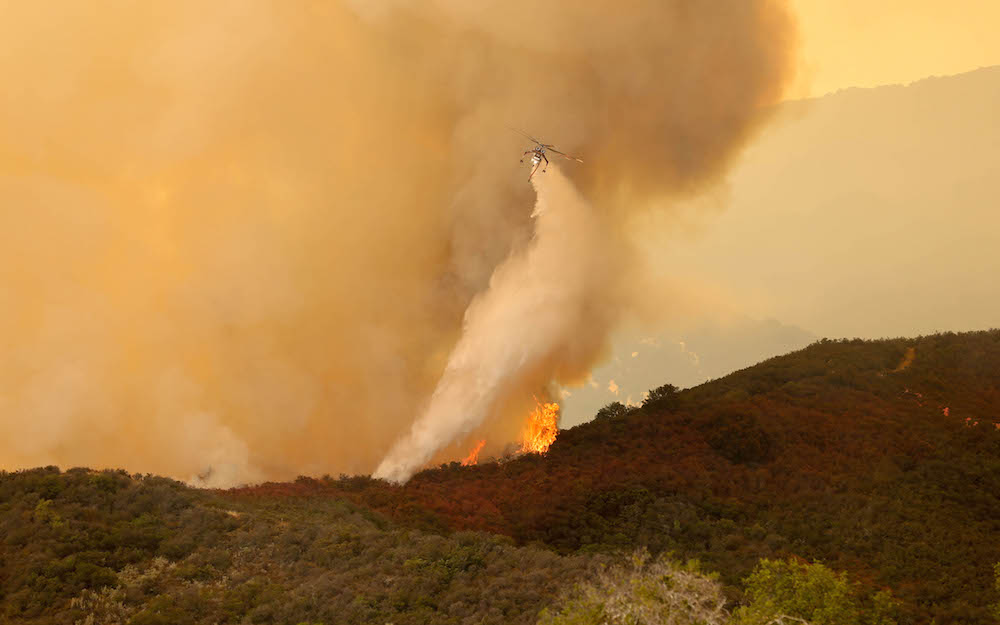
A Sikorsky S-64 Skycrane makes a drop over the fire

At the peak of the fire, nearly 2,000 firefighters were assigned to the incident. Approximately 19 residents lost power as Southern California Edison was forced to shut down transmission lines that passed through the fire ground.

More than a week after the fire broke out, Refugio State Beach reopened to visitors on June 26. While no specific monetary assessment was made public, owners of the general store that services campers in the campground said they "lost a lot of business during the time the campground was closed."

Following the fire, the El Capitán State Beach Campground was expected to remain closed for weeks. The campground itself was not damaged but a water treatment plant that services the campground sustained major damage.

Air quality advisories were put into effect on June 17 due to haze; on June 21 he Santa Barbara County Air Pollution Control District released a statement that said, though conditions had improved, there remained "pockets of poor air quality" in the county.

== Name ==
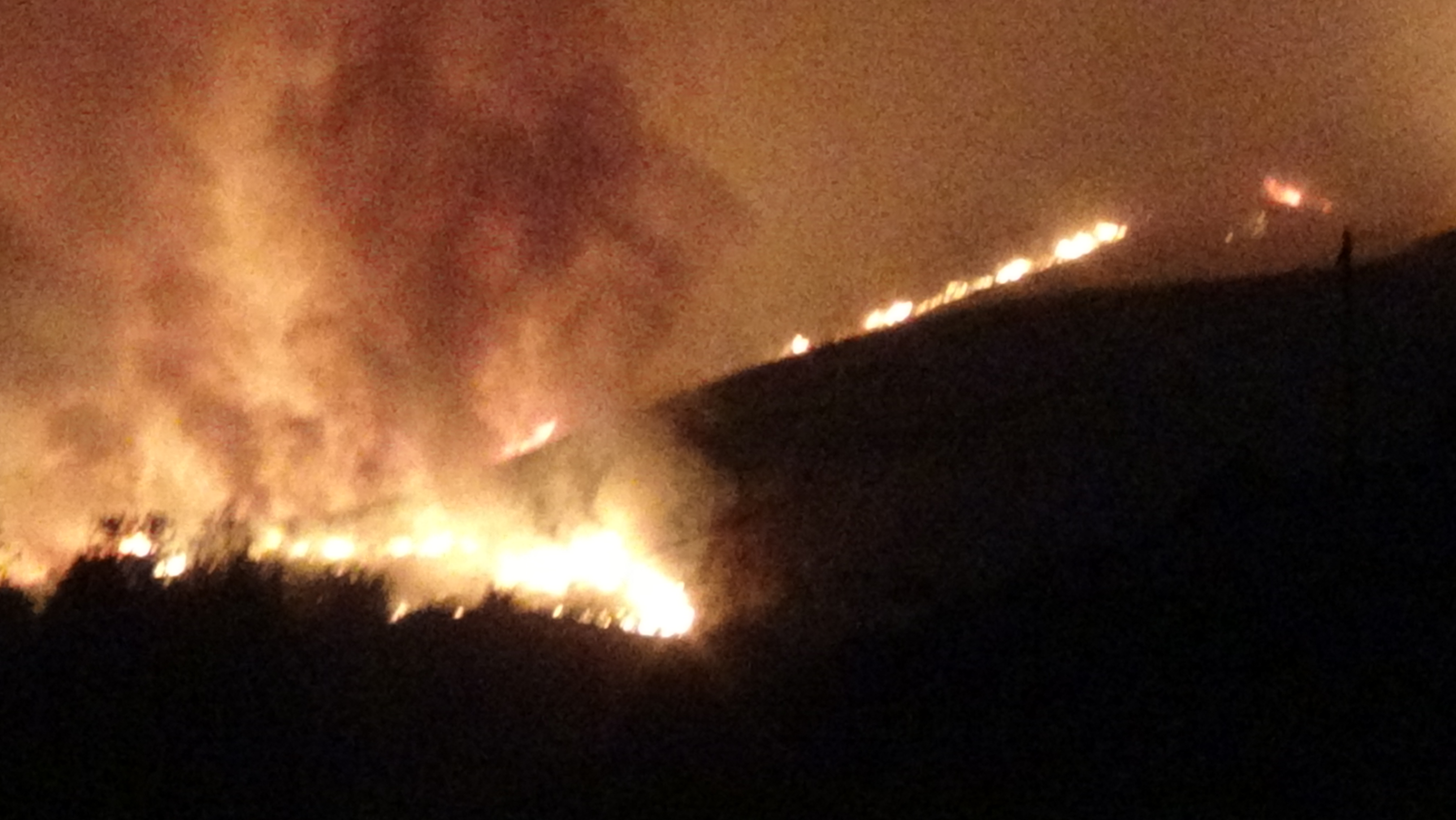
The fire spreading across the mountainside

Though the fire originated on La Scherpa Ranch, the name was initially misspelled as "Sherpa" in early dispatches and news reports. According to a spokesman with the United States Forest Service, "once the name of a fire is entered into the national fire reporting and naming system, it can't be changed. Doing so would confuse administrators, make the name unsearchable in records, and so on."

== See also ==
- 2016 California wildfires
