= George Owen Knapp =

American industrialist and philanthropist

George Owen Knapp (January 21, 1855 – July 21, 1945) was a wealthy industrialist and philanthropist. He was the President of Peoples Gas Light and Coke Company in Chicago, by 1893. In 1894 he was a founder of the Union Calcium Carbide Company which he reformulated as Union Carbide in 1904. He was CEO and President, and the board chair of Union Carbide until 1933.

Knapp's philanthropy was broad, but where he focused it was in medical care. He funded the growth and provided key leadership to Santa Barbara Cottage Hospital starting in 1914. In 1931 he funded the Knapp Hospital in Crescent City, California.

== Background ==
Knapp grew up in Hatfield, Massachusetts, son of Jared Owen Knapp and Sara Elizabeth Beach Knapp. He attended Hatfield High School and Rensselaer Polytechnic Institute, graduating in 1876 with a degree in Civil Engineering. He worked as an engineer for the War Department for one year, then joined the New Britain Gas Company in Connecticut. Moving to New York, he worked as a gas main inspector and then worked at laying out new mains for the Fullerton Municipal Gas Works. In 1883, he moved to Chicago where he joined Peoples Gas Light and Coke Company.

== Calcium Carbide ==
Knapp worked at Peoples for twenty-one years, becoming president in 1893. While there, he became close friends with the son of the prior company president, Albert Merritt Billings. Albert's son was Cornelius Kingsley Garrison Billings who later became President of Peoples, and co-founder with Knapp of Union Carbide.

Knapp learned of calcium carbide (discovered in 1888) in 1894. The colorless compound was used in the production of acetylene and calcium cyanamide. Acetylene was critical to the large and quickly growing steel industry for its use in welding. That year, with Billings, he formed the Union Calcium Carbide Company. Over the next ten years, Knapp focused on getting the business off the ground.

By 1904, Knapp had his first processing plant at Sault Ste. Marie, Michigan, and he reincorporated Union Calcium Carbide Company as Union Carbide. Over the next decade, Knapp opened two processing plants at Niagara Falls, New York, and another at Sault Ste. Marie.

== First Family and Residence ==
Knapp married Isabel Murray in 1880. The couple had two children, Sarah Estelle Knapp and William Jared Knapp. Isabel died in childbirth in 1886 taking their third child with her. In 1890, Knapp remarried to Louise Savage. The couple never had children.

Most of the year, the Knapps lived where George Owen Knapp worked, in New York. They had a residence at 955 Park Avenue and a country home on Polly Park Road in Rye, New York.

In 1894, the Knapps purchased the Hundred Island House and another hotel at Lake George (New York). He continued to buy adjacent land over the next two decades until he owned over 12 square miles of lake front. He started building his own home on the property in 1901, a large stone and shingle mansion with a cable car to run people down to the lake and back. In 1922, he donated the Old Stone House Library to the community.

It is believed that in 1904, Knapp, who was perhaps fifty or sixty pounds overweight, was diagnosed with diabetes and instructed by his physician, Franklin Nuzum, to take a health retreat to California.

== Knapp in Santa Barbara ==
The Knapps, traveling with the Billingses, came by train west to Santa Barbara, and stayed at the Potter Hotel in 1904. They returned the next year and purchased 11 parcels of land in Montecito, California, near the beach where they stated they had plans to build. They did not return for six years.

When they returned in 1911, the Knapps made Santa Barbara a more permanent residence. Staying at the Potter for six weeks, they purchased the 70-acre Arcady estate in Montecito from Ralph Radcliffe Whitehead and sold the 11 beach parcels. The Knapp's launched an expansion of the already large home, with E. Russell Ray as architect. The remodel was completed a year later and the Knapp's moved in during August 1912. The gardens at Arcady were designed by Carleton Winslow and Francis T. Underhill.

In 1913, Knapp purchased the "Tanglewood" property(modernly known as Ganna Walska Lotusland) from Caroline Lucy Tallant. Widow of Ralph Kinton Stevens. He later sells the property in 1916 to the Gavit family.

The Knapps extended their holdings to 148 acres at Arcady, and began purchasing other local properties. They acquired beachfront property at Sandyland Cove, California, where the Knapps, the Billingses, and the Frederick Forrest Peabodys all owned adjacent homes and property. Knapp also purchased six separate mountain estates above Santa Barbara.

The most famous of these was Knapp's Castle. Knapp purchased the land in 1916 and built roads in to make it accessible. He built a large stone and wood retreat with five bedrooms and five fireplaces. The site also had a guest house, servant's quarters, and a superintendent's house.

Other mountain retreats Knapp owned in the area were the Laurel Springs Ranch (purchased in 1925), which he refurbished and made available as a nurse's retreat (and which was the future home of Jane Fonda and Tom Hayden), the El Capitan Ranch at Refugio Pass, Indian Camp (aka Wagon Wheels), Lower Indian Camp (aka Punch Bowl), and Agua Caliente Springs.

== The Four Horsemen ==
Knapp, Billings, Peabody, and Clarence Black all lived in the same Eucalyptus Hill area of Montectio and as all owned horses, were soon called the Four Horsemen of Eucalyptus Hill. The moniker in part was given because the four acted together in philanthropic efforts, especially for Santa Barbara Cottage Hospital.

Founded by 50 women in 1888, the hospital was transitioning from convalescent treatment to modern insurance-based medical care in the early 1910s. A new hospital building was needed, and the all-women board sought outside assistance for the first time. They first met with Clarence Black, President of Cadillac, in 1914 and asked him to form a board and take over. Black made the hospital's plight known to his friends and all four, over the next year or two, joined the board and began funding the hospital's growth in significant ways.

== Knapp at Cottage ==
Knapp first became involved in 1914 by funding the purchase of a new X-ray department including the Kelly Koett X-ray machines. He joined the hospital board in 1916, and donated funds to retire the hospital's debt in 1917. In 1917, Knapp also funded the first Dispensary in Santa Barbara, serving the populace who could not afford hospitals or physicians.

Over the next decade, Knapp provided funding for a new maternity building, the Potter Metabolic Clinic wing, a Children's wing, a 50-bed patient care wing, and the 1923 Louise Savage Knapp School of Nursing. He brought in architect E. Russell Ray who was superseded by Winsor Soule. Later he brought in Carleton Winslow.

Knapp became President of the Board in 1919, and brought his personal physician from Chicago, Dr. Franklin Nuzum, to serve as Chief of Staff. When Milo Potter died in 1919 as the Potter Metabolic Clinic was being opened, it was Nuzum who recommended Dr. William David Sansum. Sansum came to Santa Barbara to run the Potter Clinic, and as the sole practitioner in the United States using insulin for the treatment of diabetes, made crucial contributions to the substance's development.

In 1920, as board president, Knapp wrote the hospital's credo in the Annual Report, "First, every item of hospital equipment and management must be considered from the standpoint of the good of the patient. No other consideration must come before this. No personal motives or convenience of the officers of the hospital, of the nurses, or of the physicians in charge have any place till the good of the patient has been taken care of. Second, the poorest charity patient in the hospital must have as good attention and care, and have every function of the hospital at his disposal, as the patient with unlimited wealth."

During Knapp's era of leadership, Santa Barbara Cottage Hospital became a premiere research, learning, and practicing hospital. It attracted patients from across the country for its successful treatment of diabetes, and the spa-quality rooms and service.

== Final Years ==
Louise Savage Knapp died in 1924, and Knapp never remarried. Following her death, he soon retired from active responsibilities at Union Carbide, and traveled even more extensively than before.

He purchased land in Northern California at Rock Creek, on the southern fork of the Smith River (California). The boat trip to the hunting lodge he built there took two-hours, so Knapp had a 180-hp airplane motor mounted to his river boat, Arcady. The trip then took 30 minutes. After a flood decimated the lodge at Rock Creek, Knapp purchased one at a safer location.

As hospitals were scarce in the region, he donated the funds to build Seaside Hospital (aka the Knapp Hospital) in Crescent City, California. That hospital opened in 1931.

He spent the last years of his life as a patient at Santa Barbara Cottage Hospital and died there on July 21, 1945.
