= Gap Fire (2008) =

2008 wildfire in Southern California

- Part of the 2008 California wildfires
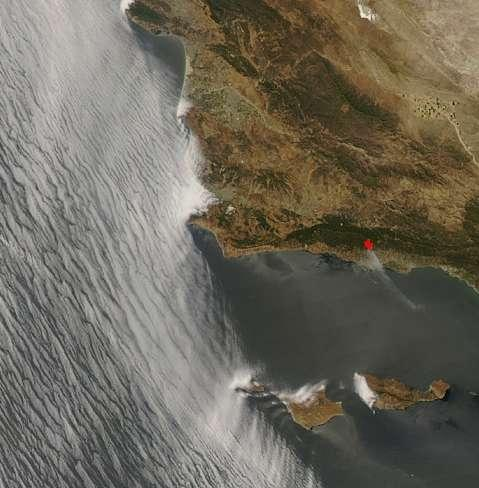
- NASA satellite photo of the fire.
- Date: July 1, 2008 –; July 28, 2008
- Location: Santa Ynez Mountains, Goleta, California
- Coordinates: 34.501°N 119.863°W

Statistics
- Burned area: 9,443 acres (38.21 km^{2})

Ignition
- Cause: Arson
- Perpetrator: A 16 year-old juvenile

Map
- Location of Gap Fire in Southern California

The Gap Fire was a fire that burned 9,443 acres (38.21 km^{2}) of the Santa Ynez Mountains above Goleta, California between July 1 and July 28, 2008.

== Progression ==
On July 1, firefighters from the Santa Barbara County Fire Department responded to a 911 call about a fire on West Camino Cielo Road, above the city of Goleta. They arrived at 5:32 to find a fire less than a quarter of an acre. The Sundowner winds stoked the fire, causing it to spread downhill towards Goleta and the neighboring Santa Barbara. By July 3, the fire had grown to just over 300 acres (120 ha) acres; that evening, it increased to over 2,000 acres (810 ha) and the county declared a state of emergency. Firefighting was complicated by the terrain and heavy vegetation, and nearby residents were evacuated. By July 5, winds had started to weaken and evacuation orders lifted. The fire itself was fully contained on July 28.

== Effects ==
The fire caused major power issues for residents and businesses in Goleta, Isla Vista, Santa Barbara and even as far south as Montecito. Southern California Edison high voltage transmission lines carrying power to the region pass directly through the area of the fire. During the peak of the outages, over 150,000 customers were reported to be without power.

== Response ==
Emergency response organization Direct Relief provided 35,000 free NIOSH N-95 particulate respirators to local residents.
