= Old Stone House Library =

- U.S. National Register of Historic Places
- New York State Register of Historic Places
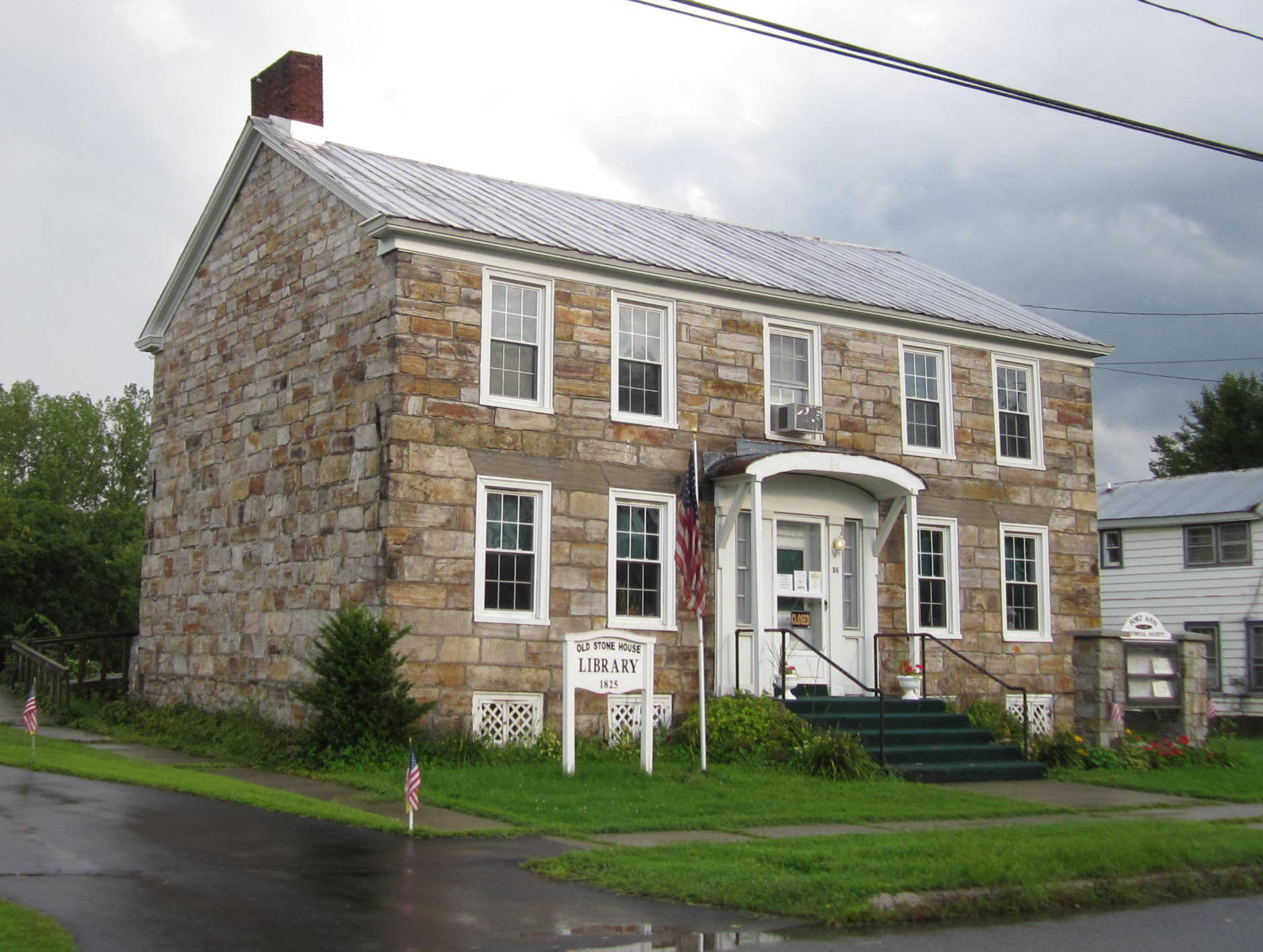
- Old Stone House Library, August 2011

- Location within New York Location within the United States
- Location: 36 George St., Fort Ann, New York
- Coordinates: 43°24′44″N 73°29′18″W
- Area: 0.74 acres (0.30 ha)
- Built: c. 1825, 1922
- Architectural style: Federal, Greek Revival
- NRHP reference No.: 13000055
- NYSRHP No.: 11546.000002

Significant dates
- Added to NRHP: March 6, 2013
- Designated NYSRHP: January 11, 2013

Old Stone House Library, also known as the Shipman-Swift House, is a historic library building located at Fort Ann, Washington County, New York. It was built about 1825, as a private dwelling and converted for use as a library in 1922. It is a two-story, five-bay, Potsdam sandstone building with a small frame rear ell. The building has Federal and Greek Revival style design elements. The building was purchased and donated to the community by George Owen Knapp (1855-1945).

It was added to the National Register of Historic Places in 2012.
