= Painted Cave Fire =

1990 wildfire in Southern California

- Date: June 27, 1990 –; July 2, 1990; (6 days)
- Location: Santa Ynez Mountains, Santa Barbara County, California
- Coordinates: 34.50°N 119.79°W

Statistics
- Burned area: 5,000 acres (2,023 ha; 8 sq mi; 20 km^{2})

Impacts
- Deaths: 2
- Structures destroyed: 427

Ignition
- Cause: Arson
- Perpetrator: Leonard Ross

Map
- Location within southern California

The Painted Cave Fire was a destructive wildfire in June 1990 that burned within the Santa Ynez Mountains and the city of Santa Barbara in Santa Barbara County, California.

The fire, which began near the community of Painted Cave, was intentionally set near the intersection of California State Route 154 and Painted Cave Road. It burned 5,000 acres (2,023 ha), destroyed 427 buildings, and killed two people.

== Progression ==
The day had already been a long one for the Santa Barbara County Fire Department which had battled a 3-alarm fire in the County dump. While still mopping up from the dump fire, the call went out at 6:02 p.m. for a brush fire on Highway 154 and Painted Cave Road. On this Wednesday evening temperatures topped off at 109 °F (43 °C) degrees, an all-time record for that date, fueling some of the worst sundowner winds ever recorded. The first engine arrived on scene at 6:05 p.m. and was met with winds gusting over 40 miles per hour (64 km/h) with about two acres (0.81 ha) actively burning. Less than 20 minutes later, the fire had traveled over two miles (3.2 km) and flames were reaching 70 feet (21 m) into the air.

The fire proceeded into residential neighborhoods of Santa Barbara, fueled by sundowner winds, eventually jumping U.S. Route 101 at 7:42 p.m. In less than two hours the fire had traveled nearly four miles (6.4 km), destroying 430 structures and killing one person. It was the largest loss of structures since the Bel Air Fire of 1961. The state fire marshal called it the "fastest-moving fire of its type ever in the United States."

There were two fatalities in the fire. Andrea Lang Gurka, age 37, died while fleeing flames along San Marcos Pass Road. An unnamed state prisoner working as a firefighter also died.

== Investigation and settlement ==
Investigators determined that the Painted Cave fire had been intentionally set. A suspect was discovered in 1995, but not charged. Santa Barbara County instead sued the man, and in 2000 he was ordered to pay $2.75 million in damages.

== See also ==
- Chumash Painted Cave State Historic Park
