= Sundowner winds =

California weather pattern

A Sundowner is a gusty northerly offshore wind observed along the southern slopes of the east-west oriented Santa Ynez Mountains in Santa Barbara County, California, that affects communities along the Gaviota Coast, Refugio, Goleta, Santa Barbara, and Montecito.

== Formation ==
It occurs when pressure gradients create conditions for northerly, offshore winds across the east-west oriented Santa Ynez Mountains. The winds blow with greatest force when the pressure gradient is perpendicular to the axis of the Santa Ynez Mountains, which rise directly behind Santa Barbara and separates the cool Pacific Ocean from the Santa Ynez Valley.

Sundowner winds may occur year-round but their frequency increases during spring. The National Weather Service (LA/Oxnard office) recognizes three types of Sundowner Winds: a) Western Sundowners (with dominant north-northwesterly winds) that typically affect the western side of the Santa Ynez Mountains, and coastal areas of Gaviota and Refugio (often referred to as "Gaviota" type); b) Eastern sundowners (with dominant north-northeasterly winds) that typically affect the eastern portion of the Santa Ynez Mountains, and eastern coastal areas of Santa Barbara and Montecito (also known as Montecito type); c) hybrid regime, in which both western and eastern Sundowners are observed in the same evening.

Although Eastern Sundowners are more frequent during spring, a secondary peak is observed during fall, when they may precede Santa Ana events by a day or two as it is normal for high-pressure areas to migrate east, causing the pressure gradients to shift to the northeast. Although Sundowners are typically nighttime events that terminate after sunrise, they may repeat for days, while Santa Anas are multi-day long events.

Sundowners are unique to the Santa Barbara county and often occur without an associated Santa Ana event as pressure gradients driving Sundowners are distinct from those causing Santa Ana winds. Sundowners have no clear or systematic links with other downslope windstorms in California Central Coast.

== Fire danger ==
Sundowners are particularly dangerous during wildfire season because the air heats and dries as it descends from the mountains to the sea. Gale force hot, dry winds can make firefighting challenging.

Sundowners have been related to many significant wildfires that spread toward coastal communities in Santa Barbara County. The Painted Cave Fire in June 1990, the Tea House Fire in November 2008, the Jesusita Fire in May 2009, the Sherpa Fire in June 2016, the Holiday Fire in July 2018, the Cave Fire in November 2019, the Alisal Fire in October 2021 are some examples.

The Painted Cave fire, the Jesusita Fire and the Tea-house fire were among the most destructive wildfires in the region. A sundowner quickly burned a swath from the mountains through populated areas and across Highway 101 into Hope Ranch during the 1990 Painted Cave Fire. The most intense periods of the Jesusita Fire's destruction have also been blamed on sundowner winds. The Sherpa Fire grew to 4,000 acres (1,600 ha) overnight due to the sundowner winds on the Gaviota Coast, destroying the water system for El Capitán State Beach at the beginning of the 2016 fire season.

== Name origin ==
The etymology of the word sundowner is uncertain, but some speculate that the name derives from the Spanish term zonda, or from the Arabic simoom, which are both similar wind phenomena. However, the origin of the name is more likely linked to the fact that that sundowner winds commence in the evening near sunset, when stability increases over mountain top and slopes, the onshore sea breezes abate and offshore flows such as the sundowners pick up.

== The evening onset of winds ==
The early evening onset of Sundowner winds (typically after sunset) is closely tied to the unique orography of Santa Barbara County, which is shaped by two transverse ranges: the Santa Ynez Mountains and the San Rafael Mountains. The Santa Ynez Mountains, with elevations exceeding 1,000 m (4,864 ft), separate the cool, stable marine air over the Pacific Ocean from the Santa Ynez Valley. The San Rafael Mountains, which rise above 2,000 m (6,820 ft), merge with the Santa Ynez Mountains along their western flank, forming the V-shaped Santa Ynez Valley. This configuration is essential for Sundowner development; without the presence of the San Rafael Mountains and the resulting valley geometry, Sundowner winds would not occur. For example, if the San Rafael Mountains were reduced to less than half their current height, northerly pressure driven winds would likely blow throughout the day rather than intensifying in the late afternoon and evening. In the actual terrain, Sundowner winds typically strengthen after sunset due to the cooling of the mountain slopes and increase in stability next to mountain top, which enhances downslope acceleration. The onset of winds do not start at the same time along the Santa Ynez Mountain range. Western Sundowners typically begin from late afternoon to early evening, whereas the Eastern Sundowners may enhance after sunset but are generally stronger late in the evening.

== Mountain waves and the lee-slope jet ==
Gusts, temperature, and humidity exhibit pronounced spatial and temporal variability during Sundowner events. This variability is difficult to predict because it depends on several factors, including the influence of complex terrain on the winds, the height and strength of the inversion layer, and interactions between the offshore, dry, and relatively warm air and the cool marine boundary layer. These processes have been documented in observational and modeling studies.

Like many downslope windstorms, Sundowners are associated with the formation of mountain waves. Mountain waves, also known as lee waves, are atmospheric internal gravity waves that develop when stable air is forced to rise over a mountain barrier with winds oriented nearly perpendicular to the ridgeline. As the air ascends the slope and then descends on the lee side, it begins to oscillate, producing a repeating wave pattern downstream of the mountains. The behavior of the flow over the mountains is often described using the hydraulic analog framework. In a river, fast moving water accelerates as it passes over a raised obstacle because the depth of the water column must decrease to conserve mass. Air parcels behave similarly: when stable air approaches a mountain, the increased resistance to vertical motion acts as a restoring force. If the cross barrier wind is strong and a stable inversion layer is positioned near the mountaintop, the flow can transition from a slower, subcritical state to a faster, supercritical state as it crests the ridge. This transition produces a "shooting" high speed flow down the lee slope, analogous to hydraulic acceleration in water. This high-speed air eventually slows down and abruptly shoots upward in a turbulent shockwave called an atmospheric hydraulic jump. The region next to the jump may exhibit a reverse flow or a rotor feature. The presence of a stably stratified layer close to mountain top is not only important for the shooting flow, it also explains the oscillatory behavior of air parcels as they move downstream of the mountain range.

Sundowner winds can be understood within this framework. The accelerated downslope flow, often referred to as the lee slope jet, has been observed during several field campaigns, including the Sundowner Wind Pilot Study and the Sundowner Winds Experiment (SWEX), which used mobile and stationary lidars, wind profilers, radiosondes, ceilometers, mobile meteorological units and flux towers to document the structure of the winds.

Mountain waves, hydraulic jumps and rotors, and their interaction with an elevated inversion layer have been observed with weather stations, Raman and Doppler lidars deployed aboard the Naval Postgraduate School's twin-otter aircraft during the SWEX field campaign. Locations where the hydraulic jump is present are characterized by strong upward motion, weak surface winds, and enhanced turbulence

== Sundowner variability and demise ==
Sundowner winds are not constant throughout the night, especially along the foothills of the Santa Ynez Mountains and in coastal areas. Wind speeds can weaken abruptly—from minutes to several hours—and then re intensify. Observational studies suggest that this intermittency is linked to the position and evolution of the hydraulic jump, which can shift north or south along the mountain slope during the night. The termination of Sundowner winds has been consistently associated with interactions between the downslope flow and atmospheric mesoscale eddies that propagate along the Santa Barbara Channel from late evening into early morning. These mesoscale eddies transport cool, stable marine air inland, lifting the lee slope jet and reducing its influence near the surface, effectively ending the Sundowner event.

== Temperature inversion ==
As sundowner events typically happen near nighttime or during nighttime, when coastal temperatures die down, there can be a sharp temperature difference with elevation.

Temperature inversions are common in Southern California and are often produced by the warming of air associated with subsidence from the Pacific high pressure system near the coast. This subsidence creates a sharp increase in temperature at the top of the atmospheric boundary layer, strengthening atmospheric stability. In the inversion layer, temperature increases with elevation, inhibiting upward movement and transport of moisture from the surface upward. Therefore, this layer is typically very dry. When the inversion sits near the height of the mountaintops and strong cross mountain winds are present, mountain waves can form across the Santa Ynez Mountains.

The descending branch of these waves warms the air adiabatically and produces a marked decrease in humidity. Observations from Raman lidar during the Sundowner Winds Experiment (SWEX) documented layers with specific humidity below 2 g/kg associated with these waves, indicating extremely dry conditions.

This descending air can create strong contrasts between conditions near the mountain crest, the slopes, and coastal areas. Firefighters often refer to these warm, dry zones as the "warm belt." Higher elevations can experience substantial temperature increases compared with lower elevations, sometimes rivaling daytime heatwave conditions, especially when Sundowner winds occur during summer.

The sharp drop in moisture and dew point temperature is a hallmark of Sundowner events in any season, and when combined with strong gusts, significantly increases wildfire risk. These risks can be exacerbated when Sundowners occur during heatwaves, when temperatures above the inversion are already very high and moisture very low.

Higher elevations of hills can correlate with large temperature rises compared with lower elevations, and can rival those seen in daytime heatwaves.

For example, coastal inversion layer kept beaches on the Pacific side of San Francisco some 40 to 45 degrees fahrenheit cooler than hills at 2500 or 5000 feet (Mount Tamalpais) on afternoon of July 6, 2024. Sundowners have caused similarly intense sharp temperature contrasts akin to these daytime inversion layers, but surprisingly at close to midnight, where California State Route 192 approximates the hot vs cool dividing line, in the Santa Barbara area.

== See also ==
- List of local winds
- Santa Barbara County Fire Department
- Foehn wind
