= Knapp's Castle =

Coordinates: 34°31′24″N 119°47′35″W

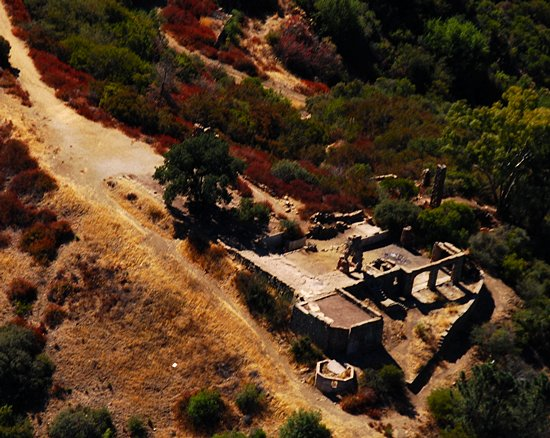
An aerial view of the ruin.

Knapp's Castle is a privately owned landmark ruined mansion in the Santa Ynez Mountains near Santa Barbara, California. Built in 1916 by George Knapp, the estate included 5 bedrooms, an organ room, and even an observatory. Located near East Camino Cielo in the Los Padres National Forest, the ridge-top site has a panoramic view of Lake Cachuma and the Santa Ynez Valley. It was a popular destination for hikers and photographers. The site is no longer open to the public.

== History ==
George Owen Knapp, founder of Union Carbide, built Knapp's Castle shortly after purchasing the 160-acre (0.65 km^{2}) parcel in 1916. The location was so secluded that a new road had to be built to reach it. In 1940, Frances Holden bought the property and invited her friend, world-famous opera singer Lotte Lehmann, to move in. The mansion was destroyed by a forest fire only five weeks later, and now only the massive sandstone foundations, fireplace pillars and walls of the original seven structures remain intact. The parcel remained privately owned but for many years the ruins were open to the public; many hikers and photographers took advantage of this permission.

In January 2011, the site underwent new construction by the property owner, with a stone amphitheatre-style addition, some reinforcements, and other work. Santa Barbara County ordered a stop to the construction due to a lack of permits, but the construction equipment remained on site.

As of August 2020, the site was no longer accessible to the public due to active construction.

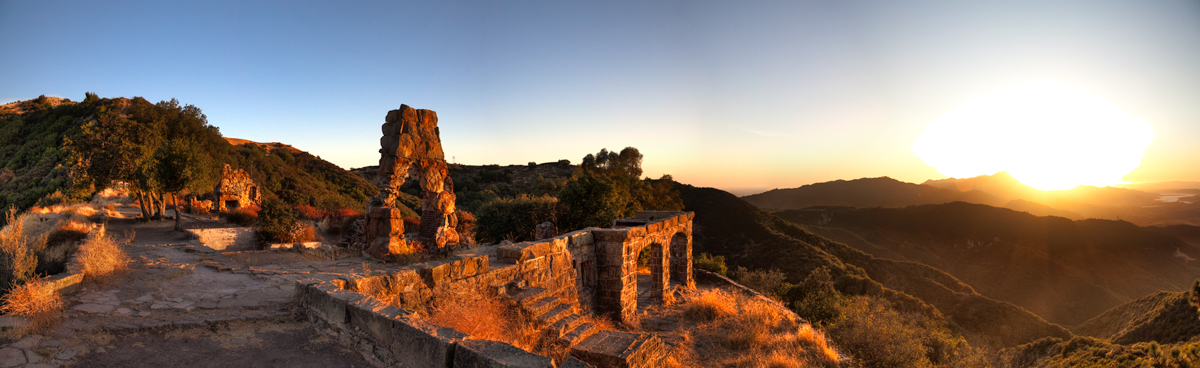
Sunset at Knapp's Castle.
