= Santa Ynez Mountains =

Mountain range of the Transverse Ranges in California, United States

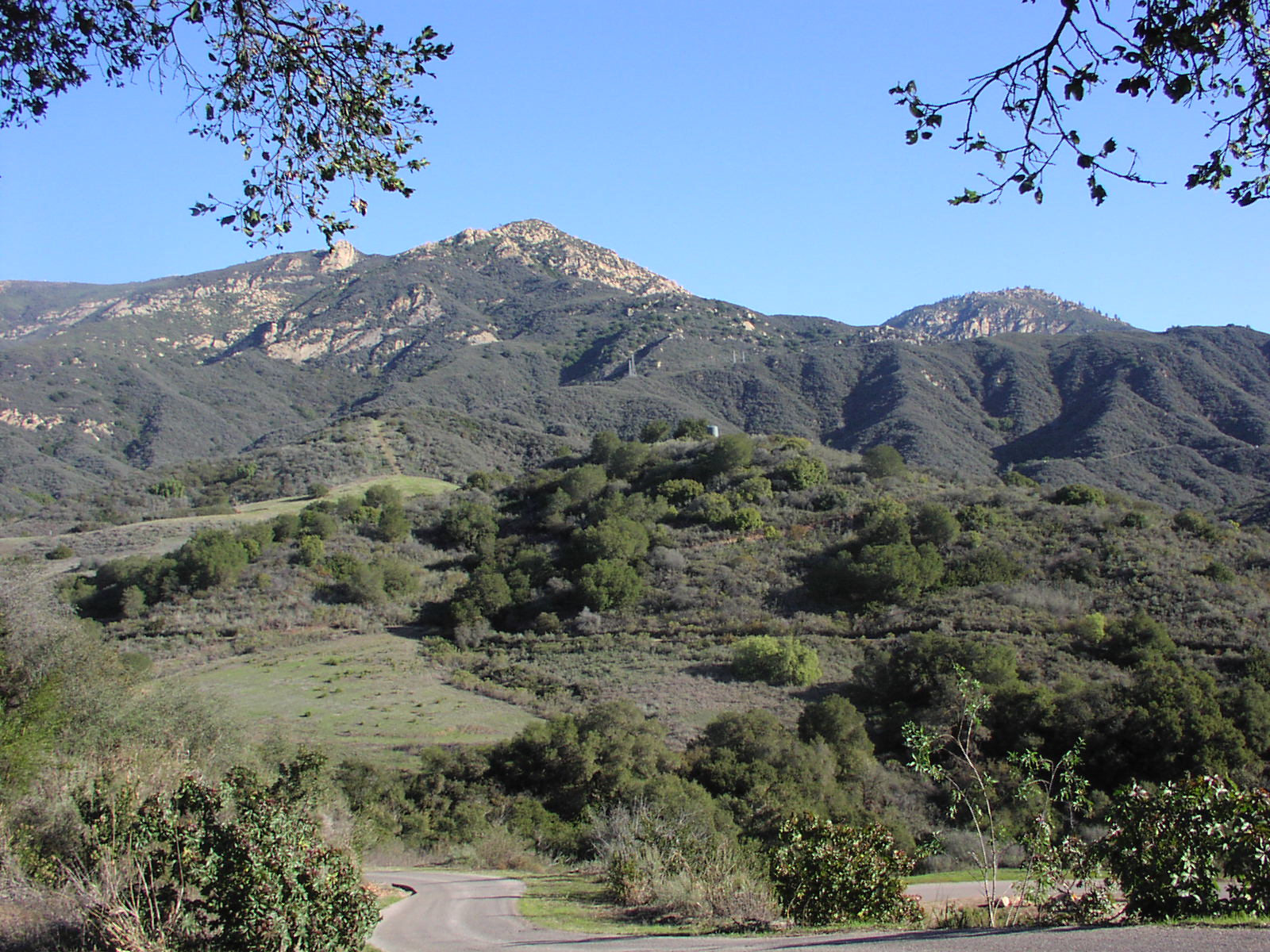
- Upper San Roque Canyon in the Santa Ynez Mountains, Santa Barbara County

Highest point
- Peak: Peak 4864
- Elevation: 4,864 ft (1,483 m)
- Coordinates: 34°28′47″N 119°25′55″W

Geography
- Country: United States
- State: California
- District(s): Santa Barbara County; Ventura County
- Range coordinates: 34°30′03″N 119°43′47″W

The Santa Ynez Mountains are a portion of the Transverse Ranges, part of the Pacific Coast Ranges of the west coast of North America. It is the westernmost range in the Transverse Ranges.

The range is a large fault block of Cenozoic age created by the movements of the Santa Ynez Fault. A very narrow range, the Santa Ynez Mountains rise quickly on its north side and drops off equally dramatically along the range's south face along the Gaviota Coast. The Santa Ynez Mountains begin as a series of volcanic hills near Point Arguello, and gradually transitions eastward into a single, well-defined ridge extending from Gaviota Peak to Matilija Creek. The range is approximately contiguous with the Topatopa Mountains beyond to the east, which terminates abruptly at Sespe Creek.

The climate of the range is Mediterranean with most of the precipitation falling between November and March. Most of the range lies in the California chaparral and woodlands ecoregion. At the crest and on the north slope, the rainier regions support extensive oak woodlands, mixed with other broadleafed species such as madrone, sycamore and bay laurel, along with some conifers, primarily Coulter pines.

== Geography ==
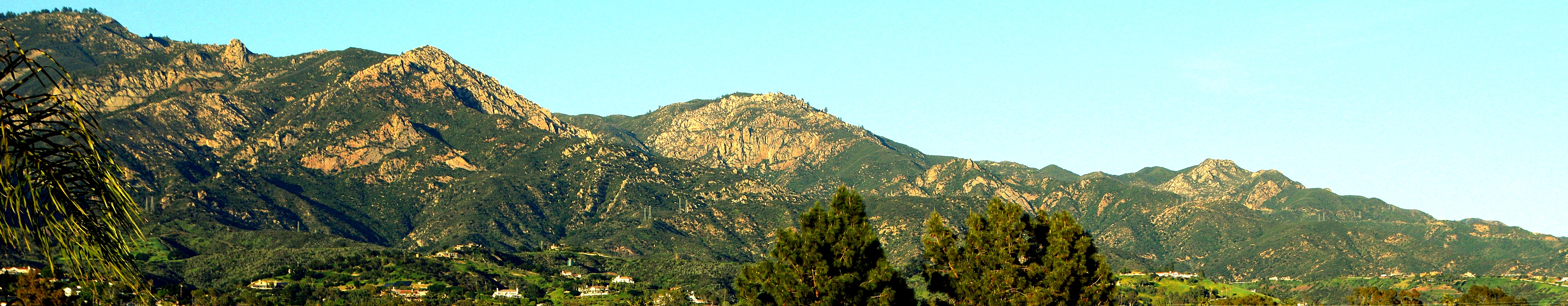
Santa Ynez Mountain peaks looking NNE from Santa Barbara.

The mountains are principally in Santa Barbara County, with an eastward extension into Ventura County, and are unusual in being an entirely east–west trending mountain range—one of the few in the United States. This is attributed in part to clockwise rotations of crustal blocks 90° or more since the early Miocene or about 17 million years ago. The range is mostly within Los Padres National Forest.

The southern slopes of the range drop off into a series of alluvial plains which make up the Gaviota Coast along the Santa Barbara Channel. They tend to be made up of unconsolidated riverine deposits overlying shale bedrock. The northern boundary of the range is marked by the Santa Ynez Fault, the massive thrust fault that uplifted the mountains since approximately 5 million years ago starting in the Pliocene. Notable features along the fault which mark the boundary of the range include Jalama Creek and the Santa Ynez River to the west and Matilija Creek in the far east. To the north of the range are the San Rafael Mountains.

Laterally, the mountains extend from an eastern terminus at the canyon of the Ventura River and Matilija Creek, north of Ojai, west across the Santa Barbara County line, to immediately north of the city of Santa Barbara, and then west, paralleling the coast, to the city of Lompoc and Vandenberg Space Force Base. The Santa Ynez River flows just north of the mountains, paralleling them for most of their length. Before reaching Lompoc the mountain range diverges into two low ridges, separated by Jalama Creek, which then vanish into the Pacific Ocean.

The mountains parallel the Channel Islands to the south, another east–west trending range, a geologic extension of the Santa Monica Mountains; the two ranges are about thirty miles apart. Principal summits in the Santa Ynez range include Divide Peak, 4,707 ft (1,435 m), La Cumbre Peak, 3,985 ft (1,215 m) (above Santa Barbara), and Santa Ynez Peak, 4,298 ft (1,310 m). There are several important passes, including Gaviota Pass in the western portion of the range, through which runs U.S. Highway 101 via the Gaviota Tunnel; and San Marcos Pass near Santa Barbara, through which runs California State Route 154 capped by the magnificent Cold Spring Canyon Arch Bridge near the summit.

The highest point, an unnamed and unmarked crest colloquially called Peak 4864, is located right above the eastern terminus of the range, near Lake Casitas and Matilija Canyon.

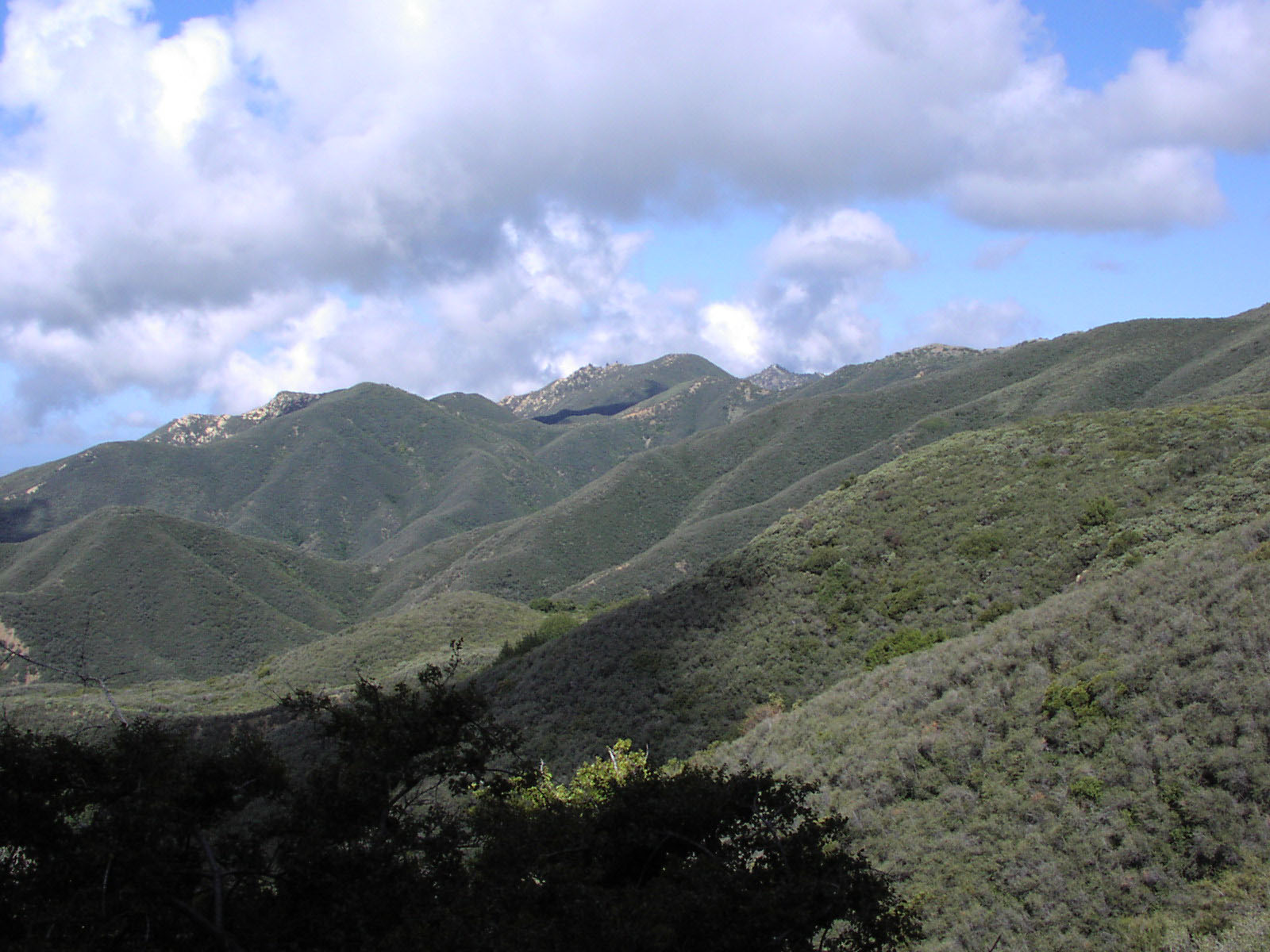
Chaparral-covered south slopes of the Santa Ynez Mountains, near Santa Barbara, California

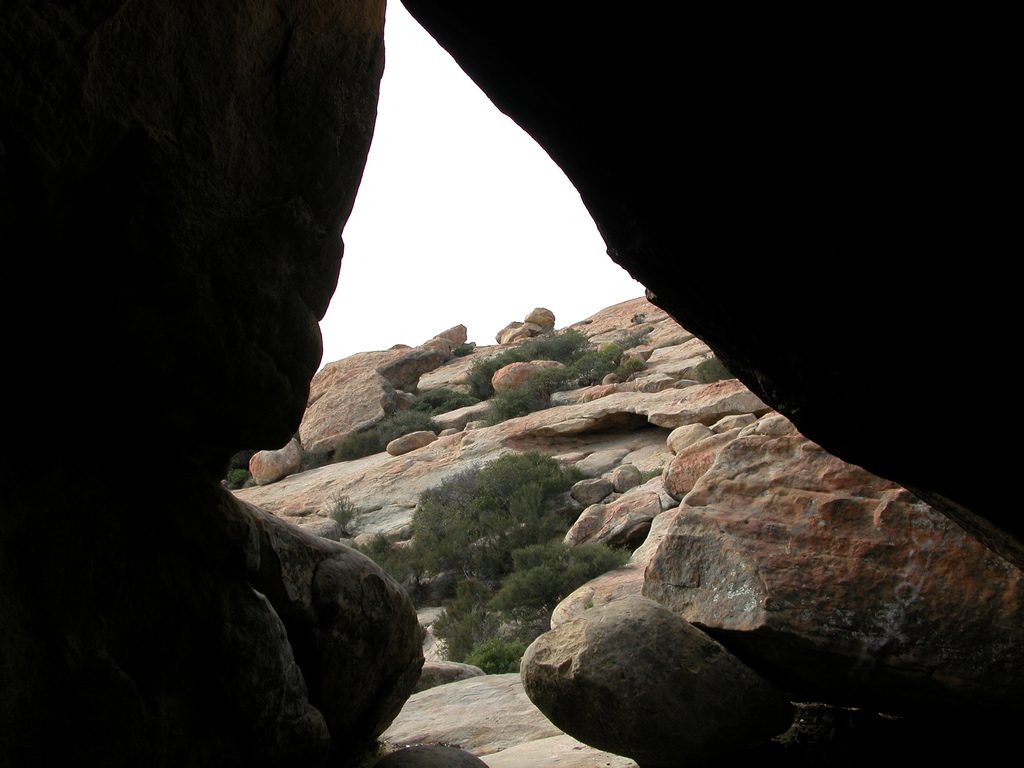
View from a cave in Lizard's Mouth, Coldwater Sandstone, Santa Ynez Mountains

== Geology ==
Geologically the mountains are young and mostly of sedimentary origin. The most common rock types in the range are sandstones and shales, with some limestone in the western portion of the range. Volcanic rocks can be found at the very western extremity of the range, near Point Arguello (Tranquillion Mountain Volcanics), while some schists of the Franciscan Assemblage are exposed in a number of locations.

The Santa Ynez Mountains were uplifted in Pliocene and Pleistocene time, beginning about five million years ago, along the Santa Ynez Fault, a feature which is considered to be active. The left bend in the San Andreas Fault is proposed to have constrained northward moving lithosphere to cause uplift of the range. Being a young uplift, the slopes are steep and the topography is extremely rugged; the gradient is highest on the northern side above 1,500 feet (500 m), adjacent to the trace of the fault. Dramatic sandstone formations, including outcrops of the resistant Coldwater and Matilija formations, are visible at many locations in the range.

== Biology ==
The predominant ground cover is chaparral, with coastal sage scrub, oak woodland and grasslands at lower elevations. Isolated stands of conifers (mostly Coulter pines) and other evergreen trees such as bay laurel, tanbark oak and madrone grow on the higher parts of the northern slopes, which are cooler and shadier than the southern slopes exposed to the sun. At lower elevations on the southern side of the range, a virtually frost-free zone, avocados are grown in considerable quantity.

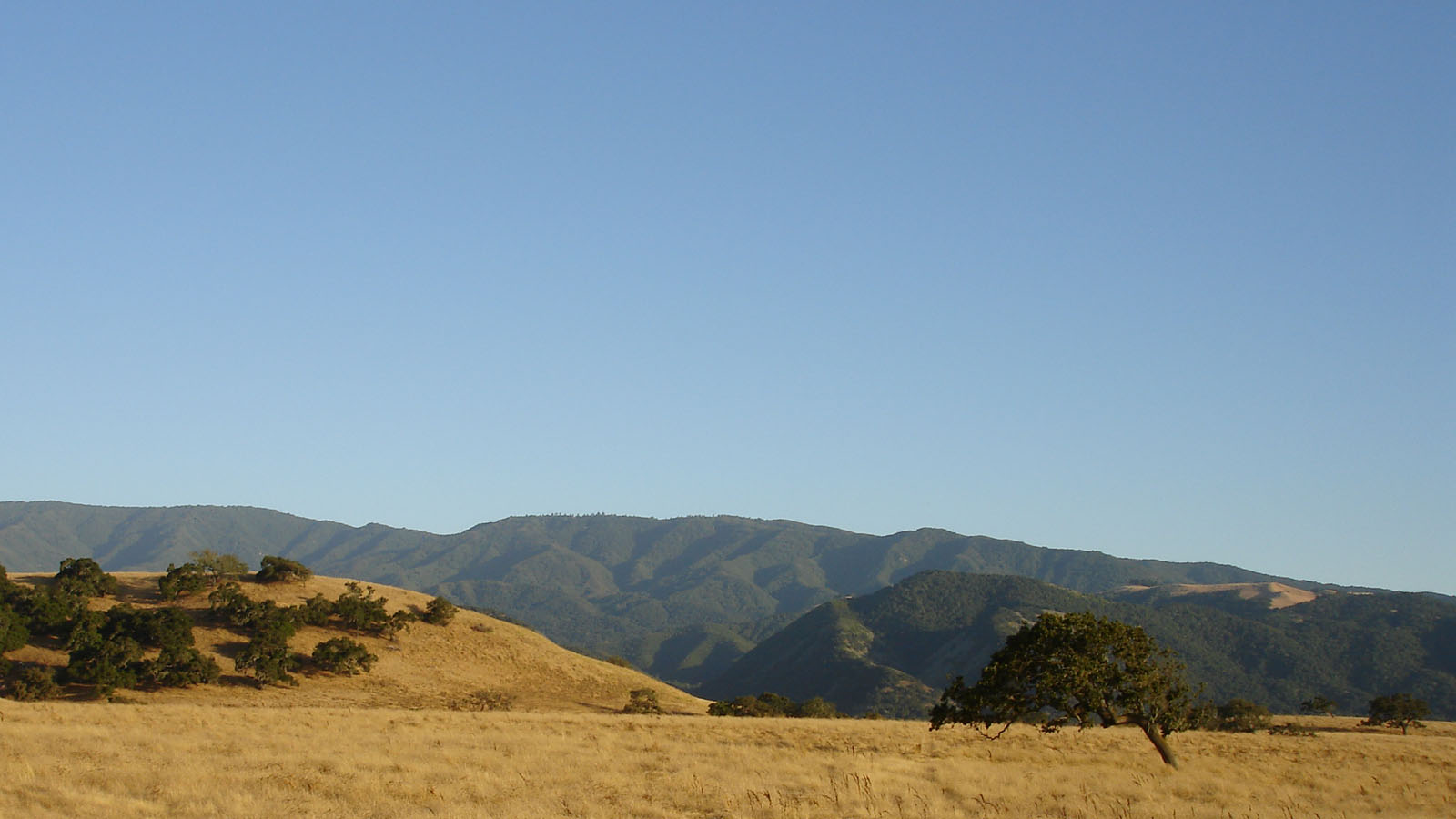
Mixed woodland-covered north slopes of the Santa Ynez Mountains, Oak savanna in the foreground, near Santa Ynez, California

The Santa Ynez Mountains are home to many species typical of the California chaparral and woodlands ecoregion, such as the Western fence lizard, Nuttall's woodpecker, Steller's jay, striped skunk, raccoon, mule deer, bobcat, and coyote. Large predator species include mountain lion and black bear, the latter of which wanders in and out of the range within territories in excess of 15 square miles (39 km^{2}).

== Inhabitants ==
Early inhabitants included the Chumash people who left behind many examples of rock art including those at Painted Cave SHP. Large portions of the mountain range are now in the Los Padres National Forest, although there are private inholdings, including some substantial communities, such as the Painted Cave community where Jane Fonda owned the ridgetop Laurel Springs Ranch into the late 1990s. Other famous residents have included Ronald Reagan, whose Rancho del Cielo is at the top of the range west of Santa Barbara, and Ben Adelson. The Cold Spring Tavern is a popular local gathering place beneath the Cold Spring Bridge.

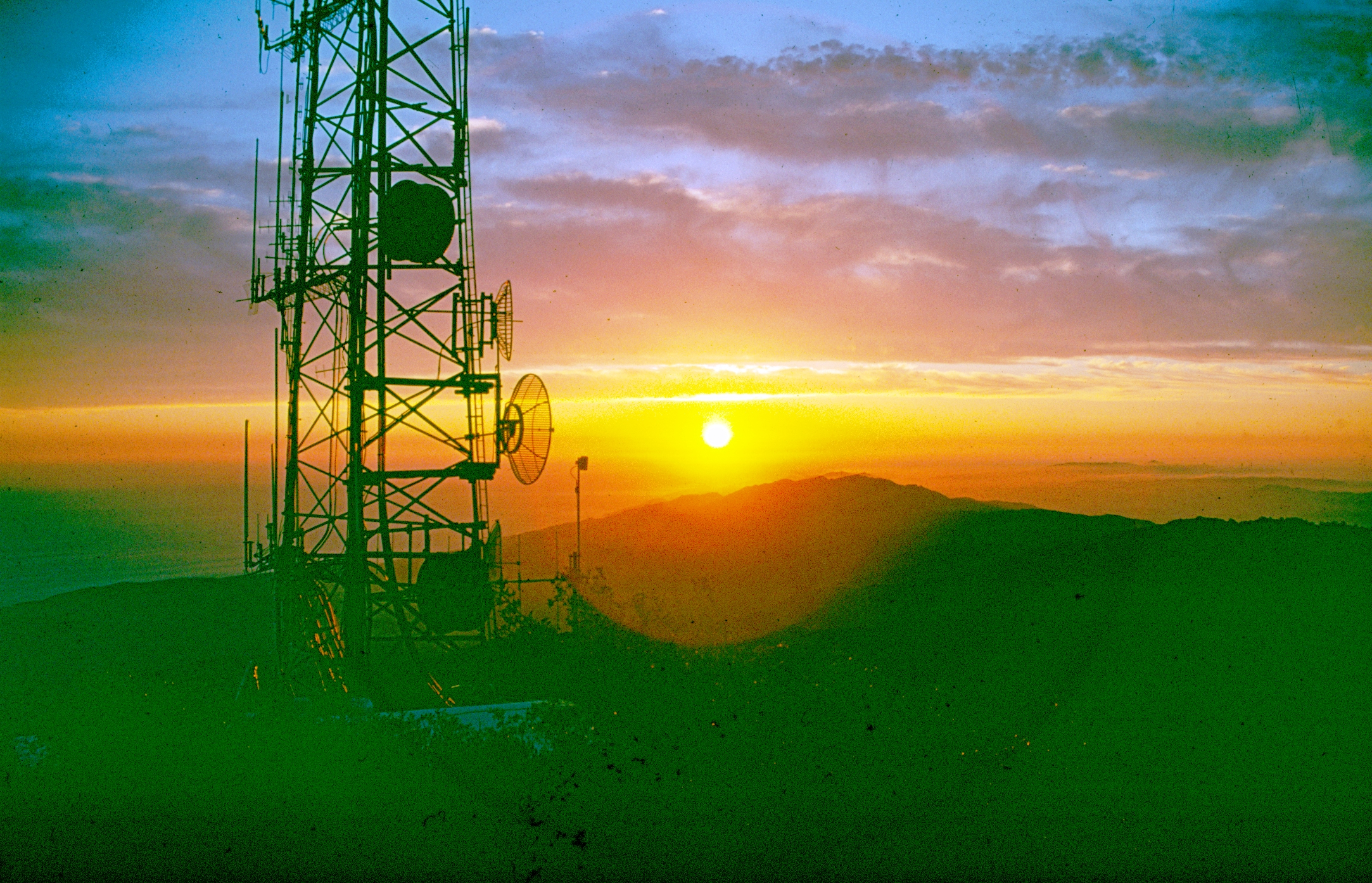
View from the summit of Santa Ynez Peak looking west

== Climate ==
The climate of the mountain range is Mediterranean. Summers are warm and almost entirely rainless, save for occasional monsoonal showers in August and September, though in most years there is no rain between May and October. Most of the higher coastal slopes of the range average between 30 inches (760 mm) to almost 40 inches (1,000 mm) of precipitation per year (mostly falling between November and March), about twice the total of the coastal plain below. About one year in three snow falls on the higher peaks in the mountains, but it rarely stays for longer than a few days. In the late spring and early summer the mountains and areas below to the south are subject to occasional intense sundowner winds, a type of foehn wind in which the air is heated adiabatically and dried as it moves downslope. In dry years these winds pose an extreme fire hazard.

Occasionally extremely destructive fires originate in the Santa Ynez Mountains. In June 1990, a fire which began near Painted Cave burned south into the city of Santa Barbara, driven by sundowner winds, destroying over 500 homes. A fire in the 1940s destroyed most of the mansion that is now called Knapp's Castle. More recent fires, such as the Tea and Jesusita fires, have also been destructive to properties.

== See also ==
- Santa Susana Mountains
