= Gaviota =

Gaviota is the Spanish word for "seagull". It may refer to:

== Places ==
- Gaviota, California, an unincorporated area on the Gaviota Coast, California
- Gaviota Coast, undeveloped area in Santa Barbara County, California
- Gaviota Peak, a summit in the Santa Ynez Mountains, California
- Gaviota State Park in southern Santa Barbara County, California
- Gaviota Tunnel, a tunnel on U.S. Route 101 and California State Route 1 completed in 1953 in the Gaviota Pass
- Isla de las Gaviotas, Montevideo, an islet in Montevideo, Uruguay

== Other ==
- Gaviota (award), the most important prize awarded by the public in the Viña del Mar International Song Festival
- Gaviota (bird), an extinct Laridae genus
- Gaviota traidora, a 1969 corrido by Margarito Estrada
