= Gaviota Hot Springs =

Geothermal site in California

- Las Cruces Hot Springs; Sulphur Springs
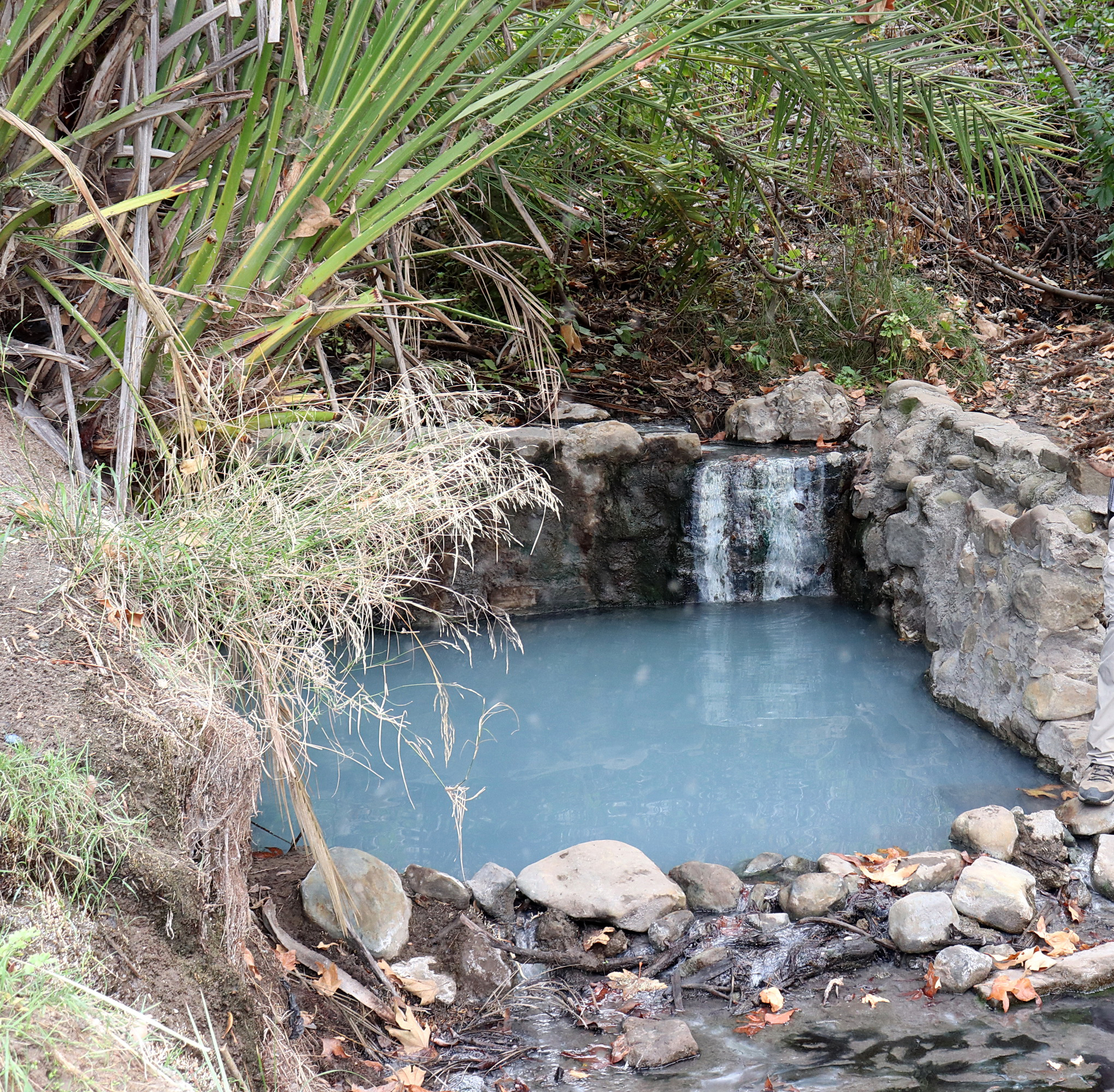
- Interactive map of Gaviota Hot Springs
- Location: Near Las Cruces, Santa Barbara County, California, U.S.
- Coordinates: 34.5027°N 120.2184°W
- Elevation: 500 feet (150 m)
- Type: geothermal
- Temperature: 99 °F (37 °C)

Gaviota Hot Springs is a geothermal feature in Santa Barbara County, California, United States. The two pools are accessible from the Gaviota Peak trail in Gaviota State Park. Gaviota Hot Springs is sometimes called Las Cruces Hot Springs or Sulphur Springs. The hot springs lie within the Hot Springs Creek watershed, near the junction of U.S. Route 101 and California State Route 1.

== History ==
The springs were known to the indigenous peoples of the area, and are located on land that was Rancho Las Cruces during the Mexican era of California. As early as 1880 there was a hotel at the village of Las Cruces advertising the medicinal benefits of the nearby hot sulfur springs. The hotel was an adobe tavern on the side of the road that also served as the local brothel.

A 1893 account of camping at the springs describes hanging hammocks from the sycamores around the pool, and needing to clear accumulated mud out of the roughly 8 feet (2.4 m) by 10 feet (3.0 m) bathing hole before it could be enjoyed by the group. In 1896 the third edition of California of the South claimed that the Las Cruces Springs "had quite a local reputation for curing skin diseases and rheumatism." In 1907 a promotional booklet published by California boosters described Las Cruces as one of three known hot springs in Santa Barbara County:

Las Cruces Hot Springs [are] found in the Gaviota Cañon, a remarkable gorge that cleaves in twain the Santa Ynez Range, and down which a creek flows from the interior of the county. They are about 40 miles from Santa Barbara, some four miles the coast, and have been but slightly improved. It is a favorite camping-ground, and all the privileges of the springs are free to all who come.

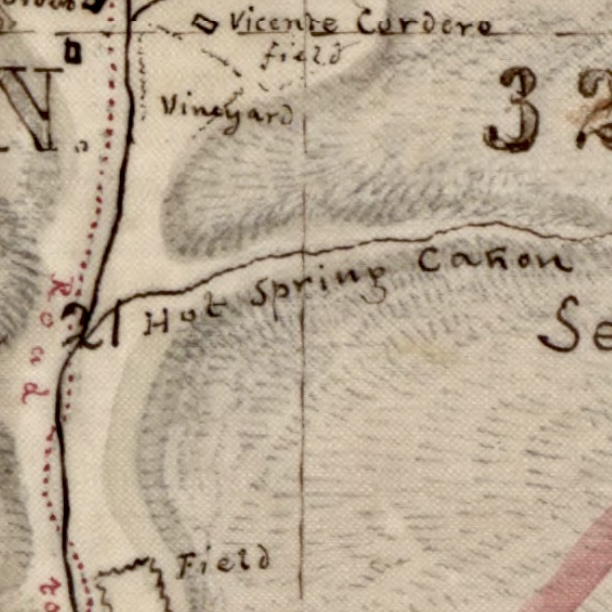
Detail of Hot Springs cañon from 1880 plat of Rancho Las Cruces

The village of Las Cruces, located four miles north of Gaviota Pass, claimed circa 1913 that "The Hot Springs here are famous." According to a 1917 report of the California state minerals bureau, the springs were located on the Las Cruces ranch and owned by the Hollister Estate Co. of Santa Barbara, and at that time "a group of 4 warm sulphuretted springs flowing about 50 gallons per minute issues from a clay bank on a hillside. The water is piped to the ranch houses for local use. Not utilized commercially." One of the two pools is a man-made rock-and-concrete basin that was built by the Works Progress Administration during the New Deal era of the 1930s. During the same era, the Civilian Conservation Corps paved East Camino Cielo between the springs area and the San Marcos Pass. The other pool has a natural bottom, and is fed by a separate spring vent, which is said to be the source of the lower pool's lukewarm temperature and the milky appearance of its water. Circa 1968, the springs were still associated with the Hollister Estate Company. The springs were known as a litter-strewn party spot during the counterculture and underground days of the 1960s and 1970s.

The trail and springs are now regularly maintained by state park employees and volunteers; the springs and the park are open to the public during daylight hours. Mountain lions are among the wildlife that frequent the area. The springs are surrounded by native riparian-habitat plants including elderberry, willows, sycamores, and poison oak, and a naturalized palm tree that contributes an oasis vibe to the landscape. A guide to hot springs in California and Nevada states, “Despite its murky appearance, this hot spring provides a great soak. The surrounding vegetation makes you feel like you’re in a jungle, and it keeps the location cool."

== Water profile ==
The springs lie along the southern branch of the Santa Ynez Fault. The water emerges from the source at about 99 °F (37 °C) but cools before it reaches the pools. The temperature also varies with the season. The upper pool is typically both warmer and clearer than the lower pool, which it feeds. The water contains sodium bicarbonate. According to a U.S. government survey done around 1962, "spring issues in a dense thicket on hillside and is piped to concrete bathing tub." The springs smell noticeably sulfurous, and typically are described as being closer to warm than to hot.

U.S. government geologist Gerald A. Waring described Las Cruces Hot Springs in 1915:

Las Cruces Hot Springs issue on a hillside about 18 miles (29 km) west of San Marcos Hot Springs and 4 miles (6.4 km) northward from Gaviota railroad station on the coast. Four warm springs here furnish about 50 US gallons (190 L; 42 imp gal) a minute of mildly sulphureted water and in two of the springs inflammable gas rises. A ledge of calcareous material back of the largest springs probably has been formed by deposition from the water. In 1908 there was a bathhouse at the largest spring, and the place was occasionally visited by campers. The topographic position of the springs is worthy of note, as they are in a little swale on the mountain side one half mile from and 400 feet above the main drainage canyon of this region. Thick-bedded sandstone here dips about 30° SW and strikes nearly in the direction of steepest slope.

One newspaper article from 1984 stated that Gaviota springs are "unusual inasmuch as tritium dating shows the water to be about 38 years old, coming from a depth of about 3,280 feet (1,000 m), with water temperature of 115 °F (46 °C) and a rate of flow of 25 US gallons (95 L; 21 imp gal) a minute."

== See also ==
- List of hot springs in the United States § California
- Gaviota Coast
- Nojoqui Falls
- Montecito Hot Springs
- Big Caliente Hot Springs
- Veronica Springs
