= Rancho Las Cruces =

Land grant in California

Coordinates: 34.540°N 120.230°W

Rancho Las Cruces was a 8,888-acre (35.97 km^{2}) Mexican land grant in the Santa Ynez Mountains of present-day Santa Barbara County, California given in 1837 by Governor Juan B. Alvarado to Miguel Cordero. The name means "the crosses". The grant was inland of present-day Gaviota Beach and the Gaviota Tunnel.

== History ==
Cordero (1795–1851), son of Mariano Antonio Cordero (1750–1821), was the former majordomo of Mission La Purísima Concepción. In 1822, Miguel Cordero married Maria Antonia Jimenez (1796-1858). Miguel Cordero retired from active military service in 1833, and was granted the two square league Rancho Las Cruces. The rancho was only a few miles east Rancho Cañada de Salsipuedes granted to his brother Pedro Cordero in 1844.

Miguel Cordero died in 1851, at about the same time the U.S. Congress passed "An Act to Ascertain and Settle Private Land Grant Claims in the State of California". His widow and children did not realize the new requirement. Maria Antonia Jimenez died in 1858, and an undivided interest in Rancho Las Cruces to each of their 9 children. Establishing title became a priority after the enactment of the Homestead Act of 1862, when the US Surveyor General began measuring tracts for settlers. The limiting date for filing a claim, established by the Act of 1851, had long since passed. In 1876, the claimants submitted a petition to the US Congress in order that the claim might be heard in the US District Court. Congress approved the petition; the district court heard the case and confirmed the grant. The grant was patented to the heirs of Miguel Cordero in 1883.

In 1880 Vincente Cordero, son of Miguel Cordero, sold his interest to Colonel W.W. Hollister and Thomas and Albert Dibblee.

== Historic sites of the Rancho ==
- Las Cruces Adobe. The home of Miguel Cordero family members, probably constructed in the 1850s or earlier.
- Gaviota Hot Springs

== See also ==
- Las Cruces, California
