= Parma Park =

Park in Santa Barbara, California

Coordinates: 34.45033888°N 119.67950555°W

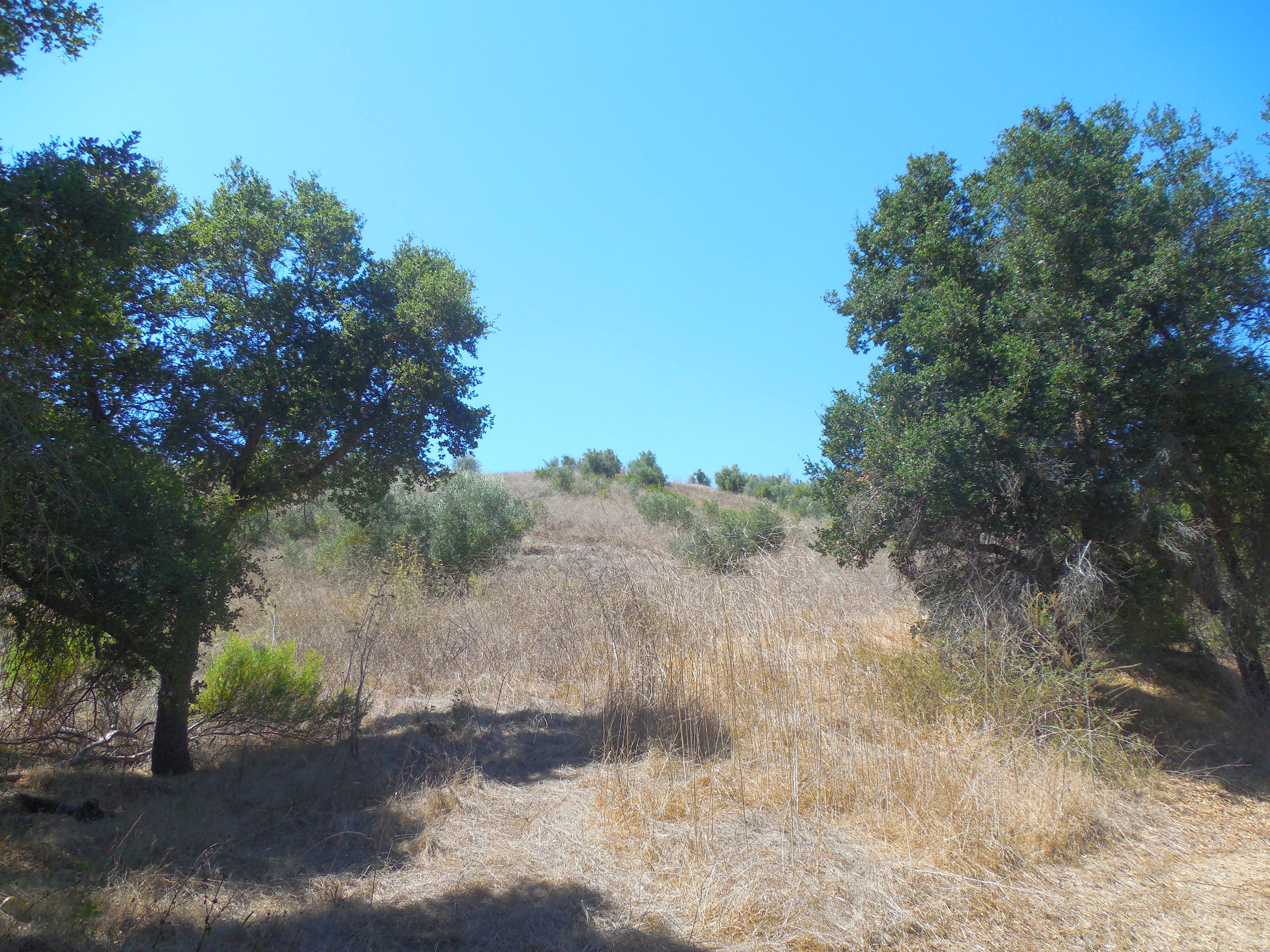
picture of Parma Park

Parma Park is a park located in Santa Barbara, California.

The park is situated on State Route 192 (Stanwood Drive) about one mile west of its junction with State Route 144. Highway 192 is the main foothill bypass of Santa Barbara, and goes past the now underground Sheffield Reservoir. The park itself is located in chaparral and oak-covered hills. It has picnic tables, hiking trails, and horse trails.

The park is also the major landing zone for hang gliders and paragliders launching from Gibraltar Road.

The majority of the park was burned in the Montecito Tea Fire.

== Habitat ==
Parma Park is characterized by its diverse array of native plant communities, creeks, aquatic habitat, geology, and steep terrain. Native plant communities include chaparral (ridges/slopes of Ridge Trail), coastal sage scrub (upper Creek Trail), grassland (scattered adjacent to Plateau and eastern Ridge trails), riparian forest (canyons along creeks), scrub oak (north-facing slope of Ridge Trail) and oak woodland (north-facing slopes of Stanwood and Creek trails). Exotic non-native plant species also occur in stands or scattered through native plant communities. There are almost three miles of streambed including Coyote Creek, along the eastern edge of the park, and the upper tributaries of Sycamore Creek that converge south of the picnic area and exit the park through a stone arch culvert (built in 1919) on Stanwood Drive.

== Wildlife ==
Parma Park's location in the foothills of the Santa Ynez Range provides a valuable wildlife migration corridor from the urban area to Los Padres National Forest. The trees and understory of the riparian and oak woodland provide rich complex resources for wildlife including cover, nest, forage, roost and den sites, food, and shade. A diversity of resident and migratory birds, including raptors, utilize the trees, along with several species of amphibians and reptiles. Reptiles and bird species utilize the chaparral, coastal sage scrub and remnant patches of native bunch grass.

== Park Uses ==
Parma Park is an open space park for passive recreation. City management practices are focused on trails maintenance and the protection, restoration and enhancement of natural resources. The dirt road is required for fire, utility and emergency vehicle access to the park. The road also serves as a multi-use trail and is the only trail in Parma Park authorized for bicycle use. All other trails are for pedestrian and equestrian use only. Hang gliders and paragliders use the non-native grassland adjacent to the Plateau Trail as a landing area. Dogs on leash are allowed on trails. Entrances and Trails There are six trails that lead into the park in addition to the main entrance on Stanwood Drive. The main entrance includes an equestrian staging area. More than five miles of trails are associated with Parma Park including the Creek Trail, Plateau Trail, Ridge Trail, and Stanwood Trail, and dirt fire/access road. A public trail easement also provides access via the Mountain Drive North entrance. For sweeping views of the City of Santa Barbara, Montecito and the Santa Barbara Channel Islands take the Ridge Trail to Rowe's table. Named for Rowe McMullin, a long time volunteer who helped establish trails in the park, Rowe's table is the highest point in the park at 775 feet.
