= Cold Spring Tavern =

Tavern in Santa Barbara County, California, U.S.

Coordinates: 34.523315°N 119.835408°W

Cold Spring Tavern was established as a stagecoach stop in 1865. Originally known as the "Cold Spring Relay Station", it was a horse changeover and meals break station. The tavern is located 20 minutes north of Santa Barbara, California, in Cold Spring Canyon, which is about a mile off Highway 154 along Stagecoach Road (in the San Marcos Pass area).

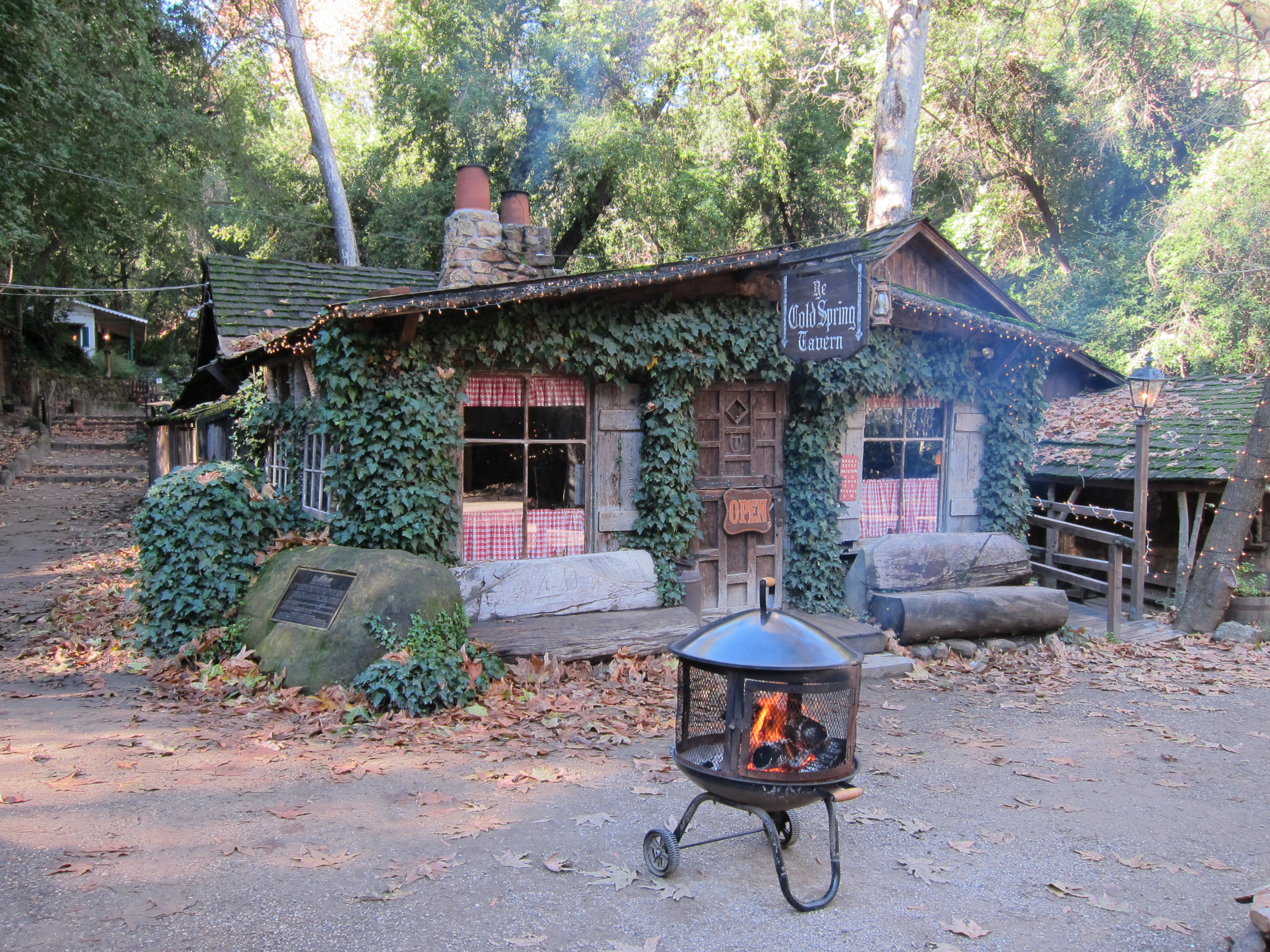
Cold Spring Tavern in 2010

The tavern serves steak, lamb, venison, duck, and rabbit.

In 1956, Cold Spring Tavern was the first restaurant to serve Steve Henson's original salad dressing. Henson and his wife had recently moved to a nearby guest ranch they renamed “Hidden Valley Ranch”, and decided to try marketing the dressing in the area when it became popular with guests. Audrey Ovington, a friend of the Hensons who owned the tavern at the time, was their first commercial customer, and the condiment has since been known as ranch dressing.

== Recognition ==
The tavern was chosen as the “BEST place for a Romantic Getaway” and the Santa Barbara Independent called it "pure MAGIC!" They have been noted as one of the few (if not only) restaurants serving bear.

In 2019, it was featured in a Santa Barbara episode of the Cooking Channel's Man v. Food.

== See also ==
- Cold Spring Canyon Arch Bridge
- Santa Ynez Valley
