= Ranch dressing =

Style of salad dressing

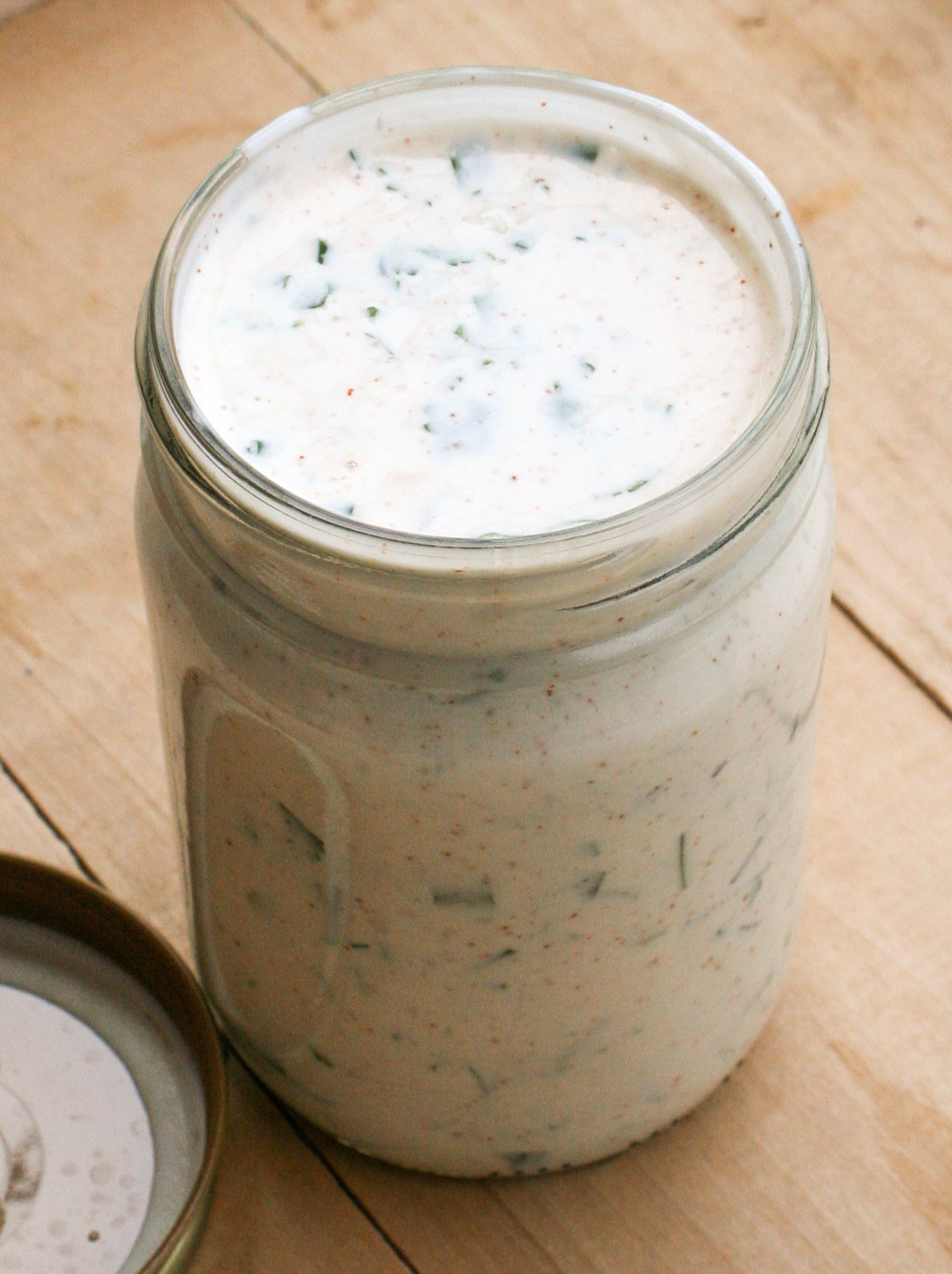
- Homemade ranch dressing
- Type: Salad dressing or dip
- Place of origin: Alaska, United States
- Associated cuisine: American cuisine
- Created by: Steve Henson
- Invented: Early 1950s
- Main ingredients: Mayonnaise; sour cream; buttermilk; salt; black pepper; garlic; onion; chives; parsley; dill

Ranch dressing is a savory, creamy American salad dressing usually made from buttermilk, salt, garlic, onion, black pepper, and herbs (commonly chives, parsley and dill), mixed into a sauce based on mayonnaise or another oil emulsion. Sour cream and yogurt are sometimes used in addition to, or as a substitute for, buttermilk and mayonnaise.

Ranch has been the best-selling salad dressing in the United States since 1992, when it overtook Italian dressing. It is also popular in the United States and Canada as a dip, and as a flavoring for potato chips and other foods. In 2017, 40% of Americans named ranch as their favorite dressing, according to a study by the Association for Dressings and Sauces. The name is a generic derivation from Hidden Valley Ranch, the restaurant which first popularized the recipe, leading to trademark litigation over use of the term "ranch" to describe food styles.

== History ==
=== Development ===
The original Ranch salad dressing recipe was concocted in the early 1950s by Steve Henson (1918–2007), a Thayer, Nebraska native working as a plumbing contractor in the Anchorage area, while cooking to feed his work crews. Henson retired from plumbing at age 35 and moved with his wife Gayle to Santa Barbara County, California, where in 1956 he purchased a guest ranch in San Marcos Pass and renamed it Hidden Valley Ranch.

Henson served the salad dressing he had created at his Hidden Valley Ranch steakhouse, which became popular, and guests bought jars to take home. The first commercial customer for ranch dressing was Henson's friend, Audrey Ovington, who was the owner of Cold Spring Tavern. By 1957, Henson began selling packages of dressing mix in stores.

Henson began selling the dry ingredients in packages by mail for 75 cents a piece, and eventually devoted every room in his house to the operation. By the mid-1960s, the guest ranch had closed, but Henson's "ranch dressing" mail-order business was thriving.

The Hensons incorporated Hidden Valley Ranch Food Products, Inc., and opened a factory to manufacture ranch dressing in larger volumes, which they first distributed to supermarkets in the Southwest, and eventually nationwide.

=== Commercialization ===
Manufacturing of the mix was later moved to San Jose, then to Colorado, and then to Sparks, Nevada, in 1972. In October 1972, the Hidden Valley Ranch brand was bought by Clorox for $8 million, and Henson retired.

Kraft Foods and General Foods introduced similar dry seasoning packets labeled as "ranch style". Clorox reformulated the Hidden Valley Ranch dressing several times to make it more convenient for consumers, including adding buttermilk flavoring to the seasoning, allowing the dressing to be made using much less expensive regular milk. In 1983, Clorox developed a non-refrigerated bottled formulation.

During the 1980s, ranch became a common snack food flavor, starting with Cool Ranch Doritos in 1987. Hidden Valley Ranch Wavy Lay's potato chips were introduced in 1994.

During the 1990s, Hidden Valley had three child-oriented variations of ranch dressing: pizza, nacho cheese, and taco flavors. In 1992, ranch surpassed Italian dressing to become the best-selling salad dressing in the United States. In 1994, Domino's first started offering ranch sauce as a condiment with its chicken wings and pizzas, a combination that quickly became popular with customers.

The dressing's limited familiarity and availability outside the United States and Canada contributed to its popularity as a souvenir item among international visitors to these host countries during the 2026 FIFA World Cup, leading the U.S. Transportation Security Administration to post an advisory that standard-size bottles were larger than permitted for carry-on liquids.

== Production ==
As of 2002, Clorox subsidiary Hidden Valley Manufacturing Company was producing ranch packets and bottled dressings at two large factories, in Reno, Nevada, and Wheeling, Illinois. In addition to Clorox, several other companies including Ken’s Foods, Kraft Foods, and Wish-Bone also produce ranch dressing.

== Variations ==
In the Southwestern United States, there is a variant from New Mexican cuisine called "green chile ranch" which adds green New Mexico chile pepper as an ingredient. Regional restaurant chains, like Dion's, produce and sell green chile ranch, as do others.

Other variations include avocado, roasted red pepper, and truffle.

== Trademark lawsuit ==
One side effect of the adoption of the name "ranch" for Henson's new salad dressing was that it resulted in a federal lawsuit over whether the phrase "ranch style" could be used to describe competing salad dressing products. Since the early 1930s, there had also been an existing brand of pinto beans branded as "Ranch Style Beans", since marketed by Conagra Brands.

In 1975, Waples-Platter, the Texas manufacturer and founder of Ranch Style Beans, sued Kraft Foods and General Foods for trademark infringement for their "ranch style" products, even though Waples-Platter had declined to enter the salad dressing market itself over concerns about rapid spoilage.

The case was tried in 1976 before federal judge Eldon Brooks Mahon in Fort Worth, Texas. Mahon ruled in favor of Waples-Platter in a lengthy opinion, which described the various "ranch style" and "ranch" products then available in the 1970s in the United States, of which many had been created to compete against Hidden Valley Ranch. Mahon's opinion cites evidence indicating lawyers had compelled Henson himself to sit for a deposition during the discovery process to testify about the history of Hidden Valley Ranch.

Mahon specifically noted that Hidden Valley Ranch and Waples-Platter had no dispute with each other, though he also said Hidden Valley Ranch was simultaneously suing General Foods in a separate federal case in California. The only issue before the Texas federal district court was that Waples-Platter was disputing the right of other American food manufacturers to compete against Hidden Valley Ranch by using the label "ranch style".

== See also ==
- List of dips
- Salad dressing
- Chicken tenders
