= California State Route 154 =

Highway in California

State Route 154

- SR 154 highlighted in red

Route information
- Maintained by Caltrans
- Length: 32.30 mi (51.98 km)
- Tourist routes: San Marcos Pass Road
- Restrictions: No hazardous material along the segment through the San Marcos Pass between SR 246 and US 101

Major junctions
- West end: US 101 / SR 1 near Los Olivos
- SR 246 in Santa Ynez; SR 192 near Santa Barbara
- East end: US 101 in Santa Barbara

Location
- Country: United States
- State: California
- Counties: Santa Barbara

Highway system
- State highways in California; Interstate; US; State; Scenic; History; Pre‑1964; Unconstructed; Deleted; Freeways
← SR 153	→ SR 155

State Route 154 (SR 154) (also known as the Chumash Highway or unofficially as San Marcos Pass Road after the signage) is a state highway in the U.S. state of California that runs from Los Olivos to Santa Barbara, crossing the San Marcos Pass in the Santa Ynez Mountains. Before U.S. Route 101 was built through the Gaviota Pass, SR 154 was the main throughway to Santa Barbara and the tri city area including use as a stagecoach route in early years. After being replaced by US 101 as the primary route between the Santa Ynez Valley and Santa Barbara, SR 154 now serves as a scenic bypass.

== Route description ==
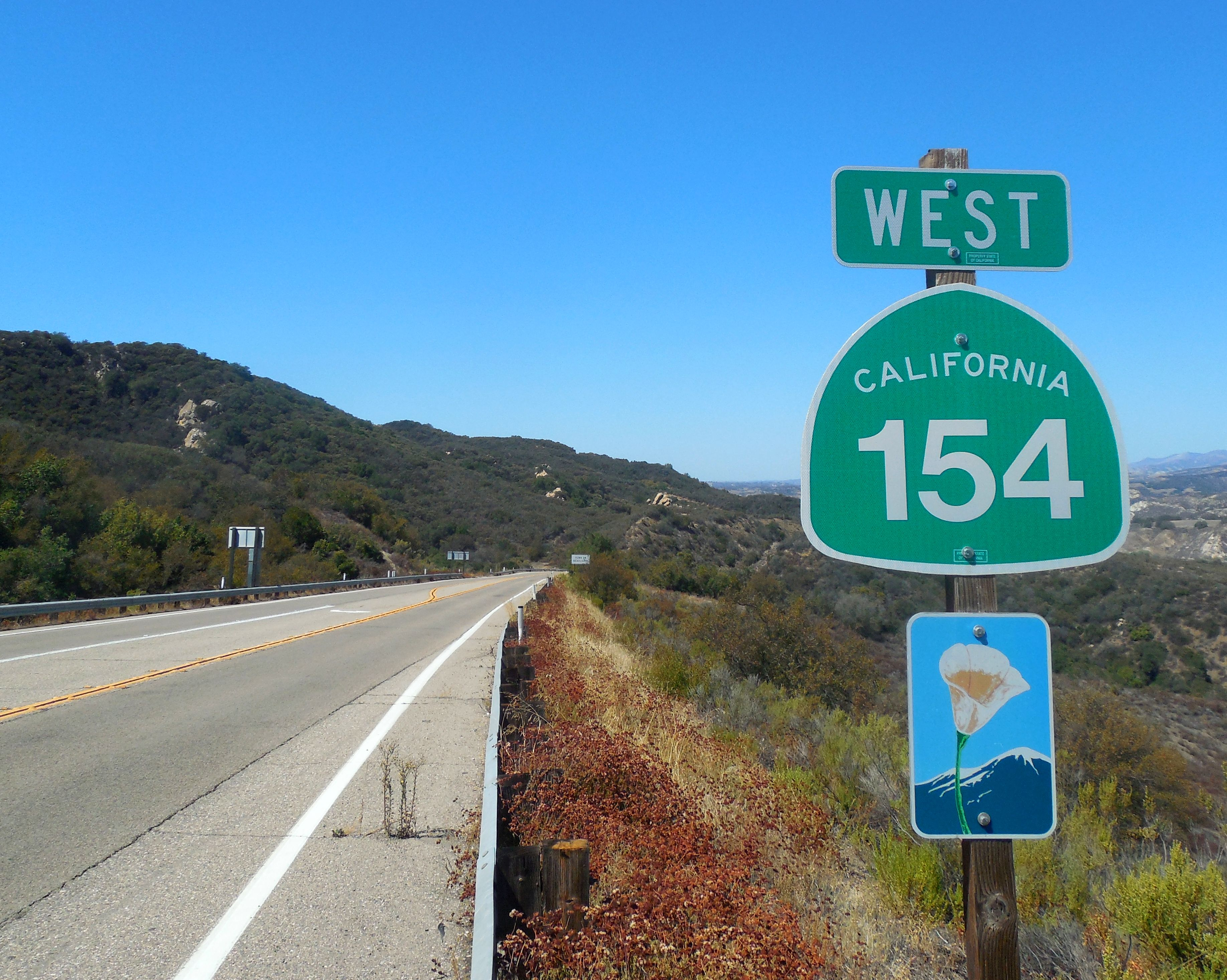
California SR 154 marker sign on San Marcos Pass Road in Santa Barbara

Route 154 is defined in section 454 of the California Streets and Highways Code, and that the highway is "from Route 101 near Zaca to Route 101 near Santa Barbara via San Marcos Pass".

It is a two-lane road with some passing lanes, with the highest altitude being 2000 ft. It rivals US 101 for traffic, but it goes through the Los Padres National Forest and the San Marcos Pass. It starts in Los Olivos as a spur from US 101, goes through the town, and then the end of SR 246 at Santa Ynez. It then reaches Lake Cachuma and passes through the Los Padres National Forest, and across the Cold Spring Canyon Arch Bridge, where Cold Spring Tavern is on Stagecoach Road which passes below the bridge. Nearby it crosses Camino Cielo Road to the east and west, then the intersection of Painted Cave Road and Old San Marcos Road before descending to Santa Barbara. It then briefly becomes a super-two freeway and passes an interchange for SR 192 (named Foothill Road to the east and Cathedral Oaks Road to the west of SR 154), before stopping at Calle Real and a southbound onramp to US 101 and ending at the point where State Street to the east becomes Hollister Avenue to the west.

SR 154 is part of the California Freeway and Expressway System, and a portion in Santa Barbara is part of the National Highway System, a network of highways that are considered essential to the country's economy, defense, and mobility by the Federal Highway Administration. SR 154 is eligible for the State Scenic Highway System, and is officially designated as a scenic highway by the California Department of Transportation, meaning that it is a substantial section of highway passing through a "memorable landscape" with no "visual intrusions", where the potential designation has gained popular favor with the community.

== History ==
The highway from Santa Barbara through San Marcos Pass to what was Route 2 was added to the state highway system in 1931. The route renumbered to SR 154 by the 1964 state highway renumbering.

On the short super-two freeway section of SR 154, the interchange with SR 192 is numbered as exit 32, despite the route not being listed on Caltrans' Cal-NExUS webpage.

== Major intersections ==
Except where prefixed with a letter, postmiles were measured on the road as it was in 1964, based on the alignment that existed at the time, and do not necessarily reflect current mileage. Postmile prefixes include: R reflecting a realignment in the route since then, M indicating a second realignment, L referring to an overlap due to a correction or change, and T indicating postmiles classified as temporary. Segments that remain unconstructed or have been relinquished to local control may be omitted. The entire route is in Santa Barbara County.

Location	Postmile	Exit	Destinations	Notes
Zaca Station	R0.00		US 101 – Santa Maria, Santa Barbara	Interchange; west end of SR 154; US 101 exit 146
Santa Ynez	R8.11		SR 246 west / Armour Ranch Road – Santa Ynez, Solvang, Buellton	Roundabout
	22.96	Cold Spring Canyon Arch Bridge		
	24.40	San Marcos Pass, elevation 2,181 feet (665 m)		
		West end of freeway		
	R31.55	32	SR 192 east (Foothill Road) / Cathedral Oaks Road	
		East end of freeway		
Santa Barbara	32.28		US 101 (SR 1)	Interchange; east end of SR 154; US 101 exit 101B
Santa Barbara	32.28		State Street	Continuation beyond US 101
1.000 mi = 1.609 km; 1.000 km = 0.621 mi

== See also ==
- San Marcos Pass
- Cold Spring Canyon Arch Bridge
- Cold Spring Tavern
