= Cold Spring Canyon Arch Bridge =

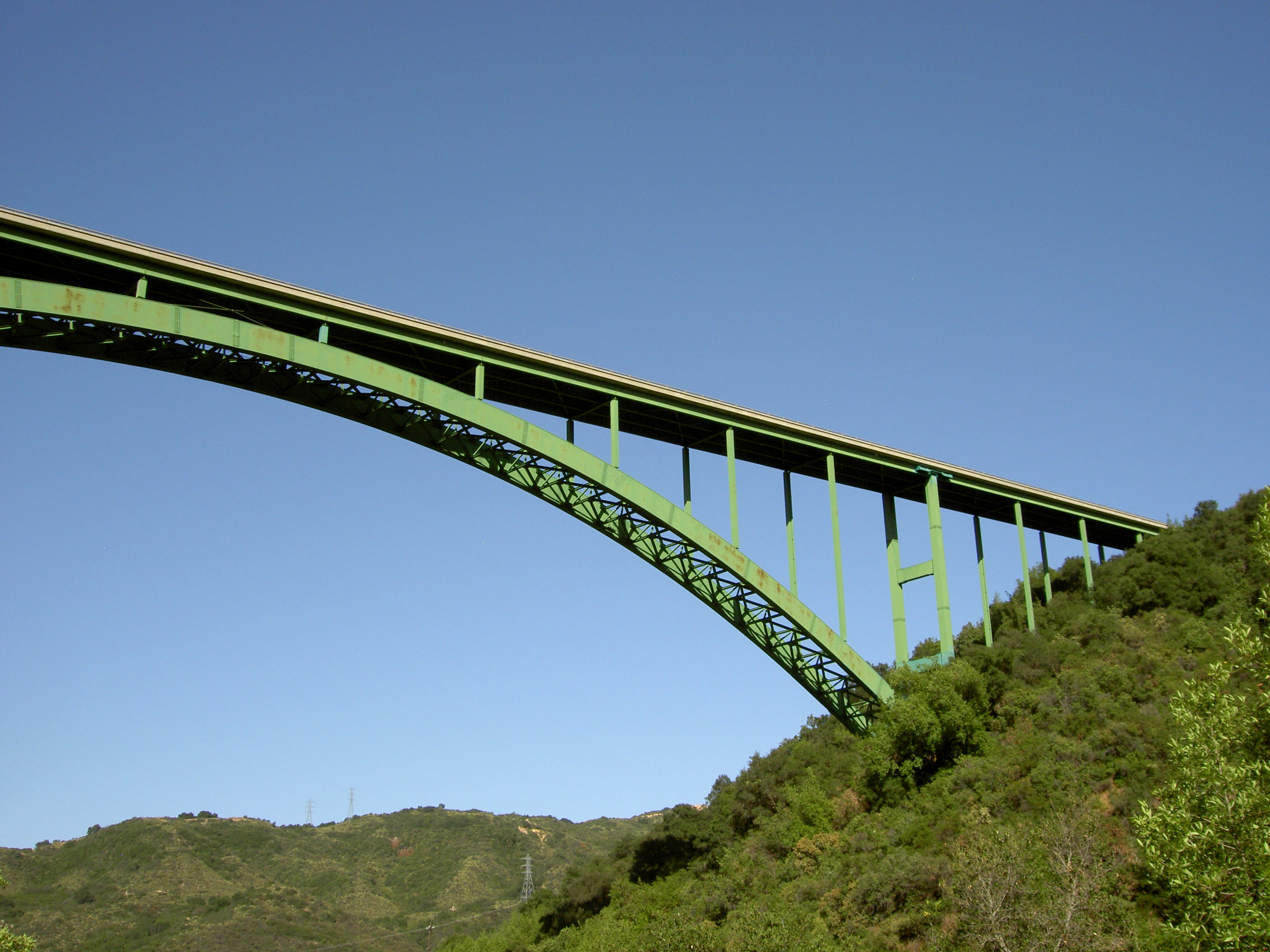
- Coordinates: 34°31′33.81″N 119°50′4.53″W
- Carries: 2 lanes of SR 154
- Crosses: Cold Spring Canyon
- Locale: Santa Ynez Mountains, Santa Barbara County, California
- Maintained by: Caltrans

Characteristics
- Design: steel arch
- Total length: 1,217 ft (371 m)
- Longest span: 700 ft (213 m)
- Clearance below: 400 ft (122 m)

History
- Construction cost: Over $2,000,000
- Opened: 1964

The Cold Spring Canyon Arch Bridge in the Santa Ynez Mountains links Santa Barbara, California with Santa Ynez, California. The bridge is signed as part of State Route 154.

It is currently the highest arch bridge in the U.S. state of California and among the highest bridges in the United States. At its highest point, the bridge deck is 400 ft (122 m) above the canyon floor. The bridge is also the largest steel arch bridge in the state. It was determined to be eligible for the National Register of Historic Places with exceptional significance.

== History ==
The current bridge was completed and opened to traffic in February 1964. It was constructed by U.S Steel Corp's American Bridge division and Massman Construction Co. The structure won awards for engineering, design, and beauty. It was in the top 5 longest span arch bridges of this "supported deck" type in the world until the 1990s.

Cold Spring Tavern, originally a stagecoach stop, is approximately 600m south of the bridge's west base in the canyon below, on a stub of Old San Marcos Pass Road (now named Stagecoach Rd.) connecting with SR 154 at Camino Cielo and Paradise Roads.

The bridge was designated as a Historic Civil Engineering Landmark by the American Society of Civil Engineers in 1976.

Seismic retrofitting was completed in 1998 by American Bridge, one of the companies involved in the original construction.

=== Barriers ===
As of March 2012, the bridge had been the site of 55 suicides since its completion, which is about one per year on average; however, some years have several more suicides, such as the eight deaths recorded in 2009. In an effort to prevent future incidents, California Department of Transportation installed a 9.5 ft (2.9 m) tall barrier in the form of an inwardly-curved, finely-gridded mesh fence in March 2012. The fence cost $3.2 million. A Santa Monica man committed suicide from the bridge six months later in September 2012. The most recent suicide was in April 2019; Daniel Lacy was the son of actress Julia Duffy.

== Gallery ==
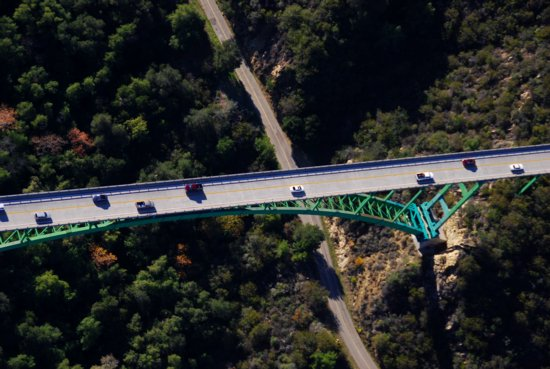
Aerial view of western end. Cold Spring Tavern is on Stagecoach Road beneath the bridge, just off the top of photo.

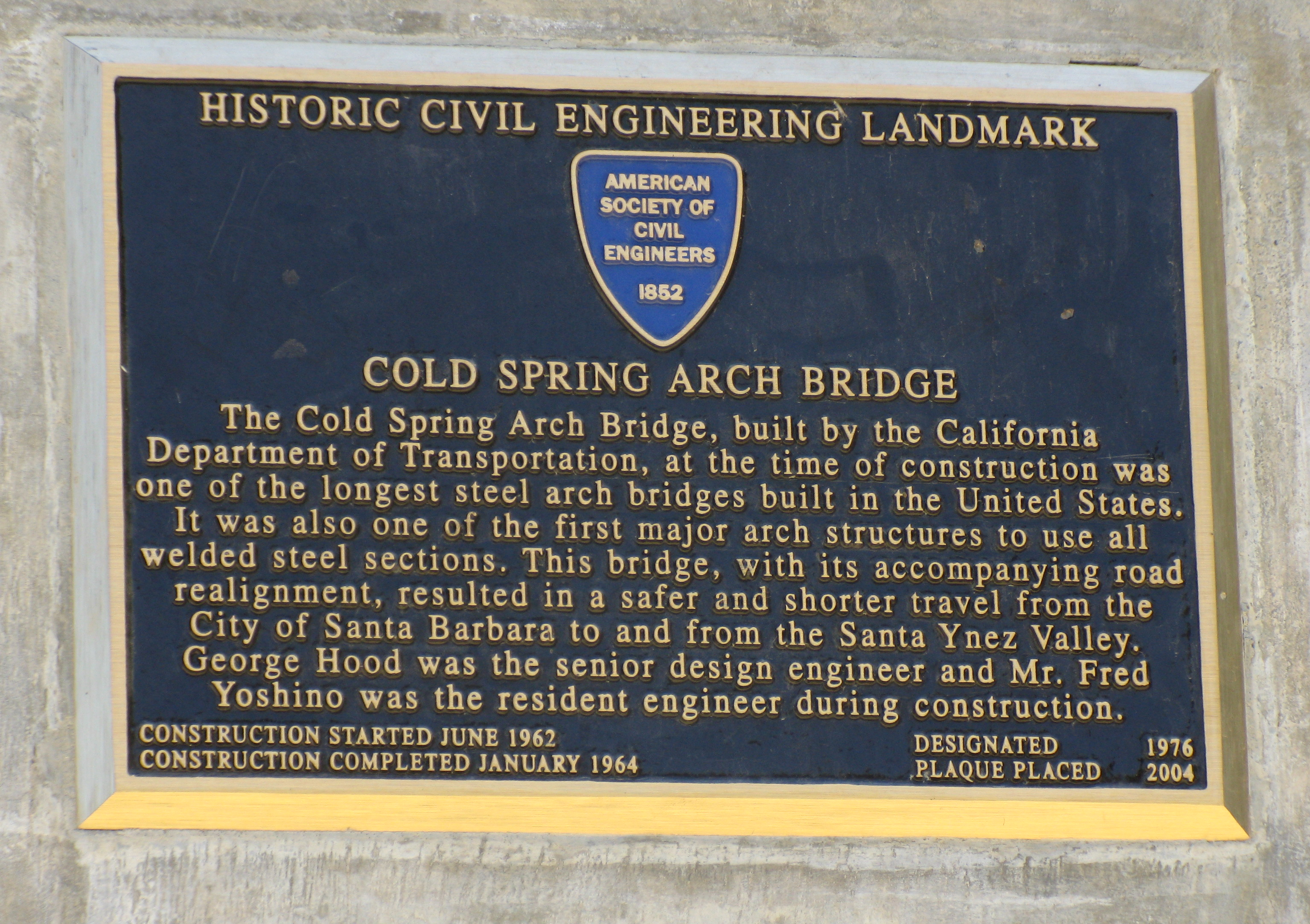
Plaque for American Society of Civil Engineers designated Historic Civil Engineering Landmark, on Stagecoach Road.

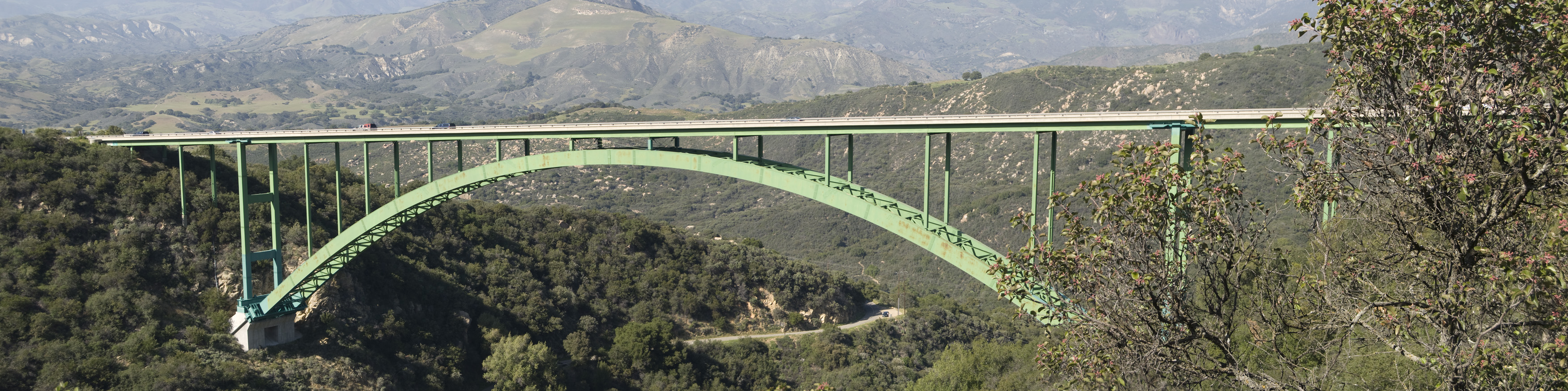
Cold Spring Canyon Bridge

== See also ==
- Gaviota Pass
- List of bridges documented by the Historic American Engineering Record in California
- Santa Ynez Mountains
- Santa Ynez Valley
- Suicide bridge
