= Rancho Cañada de Salsipuedes =

1844 land grant in California

Coordinates: 34.620°N 120.400°W

Rancho Cañada de Salsipuedes was a 6,656-acre (26.94 km^{2}) Mexican land grant in present-day Santa Barbara County, California given in 1844 by Governor Manuel Micheltorena to Pedro Cordero. Salsipuedes means "get out if you can", and the name refers to the narrow winding canyons and trails along Salsipuedes Creek. The grant was southeast of present-day Lompoc.

== History ==
Pedro Regalado Cordero (1785-1851) was the son of Mariano Antonio Cordero (1750-1821). He married Maria Dolores Claudia Quijada (1793-1843) of Rancho Bolsa de Chamisal in 1808. He was granted the one and a half square league Rancho Cañada de Salsipuedes in 1844. The rancho was only a few miles west of Rancho Las Cruces granted to his brother Miguel Cordero in 1837.

In 1850, John C. Kays (often referred to as "Keyes" in documents) purchased the rancho from Pedro Cordero. John C. Kays (1813-1896), born in Ireland, came to America in 1833. In 1842, he came to Los Angeles, where he operated a dry-goods business. He served in the army during the Mexican–American War. In 1847 he married Josefa, a daughter of Captain Burke. In 1849 he moved to Santa Barbara, where he operated a dry-goods business.

With the cession of California to the United States following the Mexican–American War, the 1848 Treaty of Guadalupe Hidalgo provided that the land grants would be honored. As required by the Land Act of 1851, a claim for Rancho Cañada de Salsipuedes was filed with the Public Land Commission in 1852, and the grant was patented to John C. Kays in 1874.

Kays amassed a considerable fortune, owning at one time three ranchos; but he lost them in real-estate speculations. Colonel W.W. Hollister and Thomas and Albert Dibblee purchased Rancho Cañada de Salsipuedes.

== See also ==
- Ranchos of California
- List of Ranchos of California
