= William Welles Hollister =

American businessman and rancher (1818–1886)

- William Welles Hollister (1818-1886)

Personal details
- Born: January 12, 1818 Hanover, Ohio, US
- Died: August 8, 1886 (aged 68) Santa Barbara, California, US
- Spouse: Annie Hannah James
- Children: 6
- Parent(s): John Hollister; Philena Hubbard
- Education: Kenyon College
- Occupation: Rancher, Entrepreneur and Founder of Hollister, California

William Welles Hollister (1818–1886) was a native of Ohio who came west in the 1850s and became a wealthy rancher and entrepreneur in California.

== Biography ==
=== Ancestors and early life ===
William Welles Hollister, was born on Jan. 12, 1818 near Hanover, Ohio, the son of Philena Hubbard and John Hollister, and a grandson of John Hollister and Mary Welles a direct descendant of Governor Thomas Welles, the Fourth Colonial Governor of Connecticut, and a descendant of Edmund Rice, an early immigrant to Massachusetts Bay Colony. When he was 15, he attended Kenyon College in Gambier, Ohio, although his health prevented him from going full-time. After his father died, William Welles Hollister, with his eyesight failing, left college without graduating, and went to farming and merchandising.

In 1852, Hollister sold his farm and stock of goods and purchased two or three hundred head of cattle and started across the plains for California, where he sold his cattle and returned immediately to Ohio and prepared for another trip to California.

In 1854 he, along with his brother Joseph Hubbard Hollister, his sister, Lucy A. Brown, with an additional fifty men and four women (including Mrs. Brown), led the first large transcontinental sheep drive, bringing 10,000 merino sheep from Hanover, Licking County, Ohio. The plan was to supply miners during the California Gold Rush with meat. The party took a southern route from Salt Lake City in order to avoid the winter snows of the Sierra Nevada. Traveling through New Mexico and Arizona, they pastured their flocks for a year near what is now Santa Barbara. Although only about a thousand sheep survived, Hollister was able to make a considerable fortune when wool prices spiked during the Civil War, as well as catering to those who searched for gold.

=== Career in California ===
Hollister purchased Rancho San Justo in San Benito County, California, in an area that is now the city of Hollister. Rancho San Justo was held jointly by the Flint, Bixby & Company and Hollister until 1861, when they disagreed over a business matter and dissolved their partnership. Benjamin and Thomas Flint took all of the land east of the San Benito River. Dr. Thomas Flint's home in San Juan Bautista today is the St. Francis Retreat. Hollister took the land west of the river, including what is now known as the San Juan Valley. Hollister and his wife built a home at the base of a small hill known today as Park Hill.

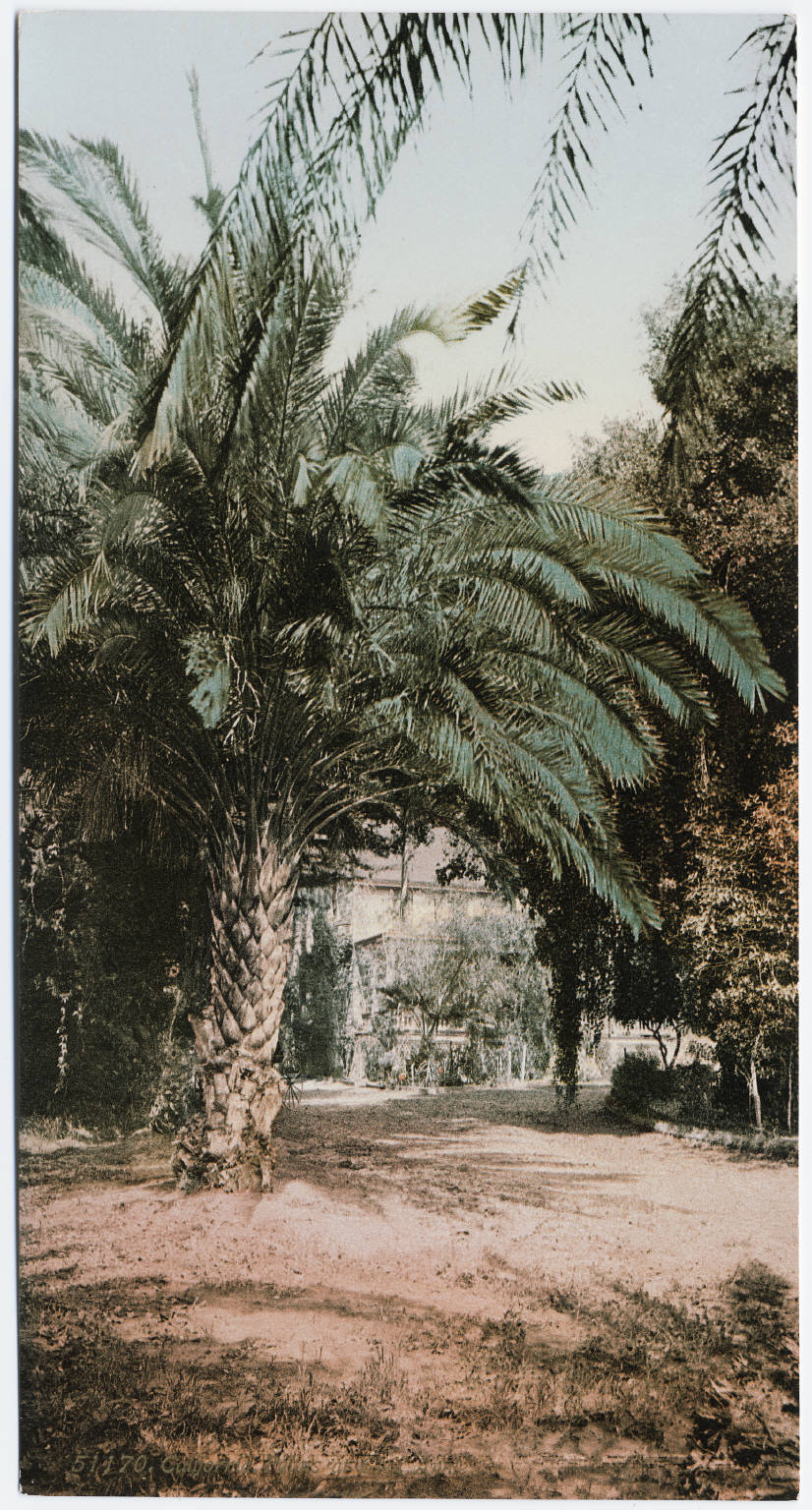
Glen Annie in the turn of the 20th century.

He remained at Rancho San Justo for 14 years before selling the 20,773-acre (84.07 km^{2}) South Valley ranch for $370,000 and moved south with his family to raise sheep in the Santa Barbara region of California, settling on the eastern portion of the former Mexican land grant Rancho Dos Pueblos, purchased from the estate of Nicolas A. Den in 1862 and renamed Glen Annie Ranch after his wife. Colonel Hollister, in partnership with brothers Thomas and Albert Dibblee, bought several other land grants in Santa Barbara County, including Rancho Nuestra Señora del Refugio, Rancho Lompoc, Rancho Las Cruces, Rancho Cañada de Salsipuedes, Rancho San Julian, and Rancho Mission Vieja de la Purisma. In the 1870s the Dibblee-Hollister partnership was dissolved and the lands and livestock divided. Rancho Lompoc and Rancho Mission Vieja de la Purisima were sold. Rancho Cañada de Salsipuedes, Rancho Las Cruces, and Rancho Nuestra Señora del Refugio went to Hollister.

=== Family ===
Hollister married Annie Hannah James on June 18, 1862, in San Francisco, California. The marriage ceremony was performed by the Rev. Thomas Starr King, who was a Unitarian minister, influential in California politics during the American Civil War. The couple had six children. A grandson, John J. Hollister, Jr., became an agriculturalist, biologist and California state senator.

=== Death ===
William Welles Hollister died on August 8, 1886, age 68, at Santa Barbara, California.

== Legacy ==
During the 1870s, William Hollister made many contributions to the Santa Barbara area including helping to finance and develop the Arlington Hotel, the local newspaper Santa Barbara News-Press, Stearns Wharf, and the Lobero Theatre. The main street of Goleta, California, once part of Glen Annie Ranch, is named Hollister Avenue. In 1959, he was inducted into the Hall of Great Westerners of the National Cowboy & Western Heritage Museum.

== See also ==
- Hollister Ranch
