= California State Route 192 =

Highway in California

State Route 192

- Map of Santa Barbara County in southern California with SR 192 highlighted in red

Route information
- Maintained by Caltrans
- Length: 21.043 mi (33.865 km)

Major junctions
- West end: SR 154 near Santa Barbara
- SR 144 in Santa Barbara
- East end: SR 150 near Carpinteria

Location
- Country: United States
- State: California
- Counties: Santa Barbara

Highway system
- State highways in California; Interstate; US; State; Scenic; History; Pre‑1964; Unconstructed; Deleted; Freeways
← SR 191	→ SR 193

State Route 192 (SR 192) is a state highway in the U.S. state of California. The route runs from State Route 154 near Santa Barbara to State Route 150 near the Santa Barbara–Ventura county line. The two-lane road is better known as Foothill Road, as the route runs parallel to the foothills of the Santa Ynez Mountains.

== Route description ==
Route 192 is defined in section 492 of the California Streets and Highways Code, and that the highway is "from Route 154 near Santa Barbara to Route 150 near the Ventura-Santa Barbara county line via Foothill Boulevard". The definition has not yet been corrected to reflect the street's name as Foothill Road.

The western terminus of State Route 192 is at State Route 154 in Santa Barbara at the intersection of San Marcos Pass Road, Cathedral Oaks Road, and Foothill Road. It runs east on Foothill Road, Mountain Drive, Stanwood Drive, Sycamore Canyon Road, East Valley Road, Toro Canyon Road, Foothill Road, then Casitas Pass Road. The eastern terminus is at State Route 150 near the Ventura/Santa Barbara County line at the intersection of Casitas Pass Road and Rincon Road.

The western portion of SR 192 is part of the National Highway System, a network of highways that are considered essential to the country's economy, defense, and mobility by the Federal Highway Administration.

== History ==
This route was originally part of State Route 150, which was signed in 1934. It was renumbered to Route 192 in 1964.

== Major intersections ==
Except where prefixed with a letter, postmiles were measured on the road as it was in 1964, based on the alignment that existed at the time, and do not necessarily reflect current mileage. Postmile prefixes include: R reflecting a realignment in the route since then, M indicating a second realignment, L referring to an overlap due to a correction or change, and T indicating postmiles classified as temporary. Segments that remain unconstructed or have been relinquished to local control may be omitted. The entire route is in Santa Barbara County.

Location	Postmile	Destinations	Notes
	0.00	Cathedral Oaks Road	Continuation beyond SR 154
	0.00	SR 154 to US 101 – Los Olivos, Lake Cachuma	Interchange; west end of SR 192; SR 154 exit 32
Santa Barbara	6.17	SR 144 (Sycamore Canyon Road)	Intersection near Parma Park
	21.17	SR 150 – Ojai, Carpinteria	East end of SR 192
1.000 mi = 1.609 km; 1.000 km = 0.621 mi
