= Gaviota Peak =

Mountain in California, United States

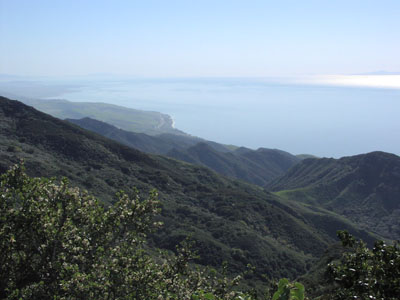
- View from Gaviota Peak, looking southeast

Highest point
- Elevation: 2,460 ft (750 m) NAVD 88
- Prominence: 198 ft (60 m)
- Coordinates: 34°30′06″N 120°11′56″W

Naming
- English translation: Seagull Peak
- Language of name: Spanish

Geography
- Location within California
- Location: Santa Barbara County, California, U.S.
- Parent range: Santa Ynez Mountains
- Topo map: USGS Solvang

Climbing
- Easiest route: Hike

Gaviota Peak is a summit in the Santa Ynez Mountains in Santa Barbara County, California. It is located 10 miles (16 km) west of Santa Barbara, 16 miles (26 km) east of Point Conception and 2 miles (3.2 km) from the Pacific Ocean.

Gaviota Grade is the most formidable in length and elevation change along U.S. Route 101 in Southern California.

== Background ==
The Gaviota Peak Fire Road trail starts near the junction of U.S. Route 101 and California State Route 1, in Gaviota State Park, and ends on the summit in the Los Padres National Forest. The trail passes Gaviota Hot Springs, and offers views of the Santa Ynez Mountains, Lompoc Valley, the Pacific Ocean and the Channel Islands.

== See also ==
- Gaviota Tunnel
- Gaviota, California
