= Isla de las Gaviotas, Montevideo =

Island in Uruguay

Coordinates: 34°54′9″S 56°06′15″W

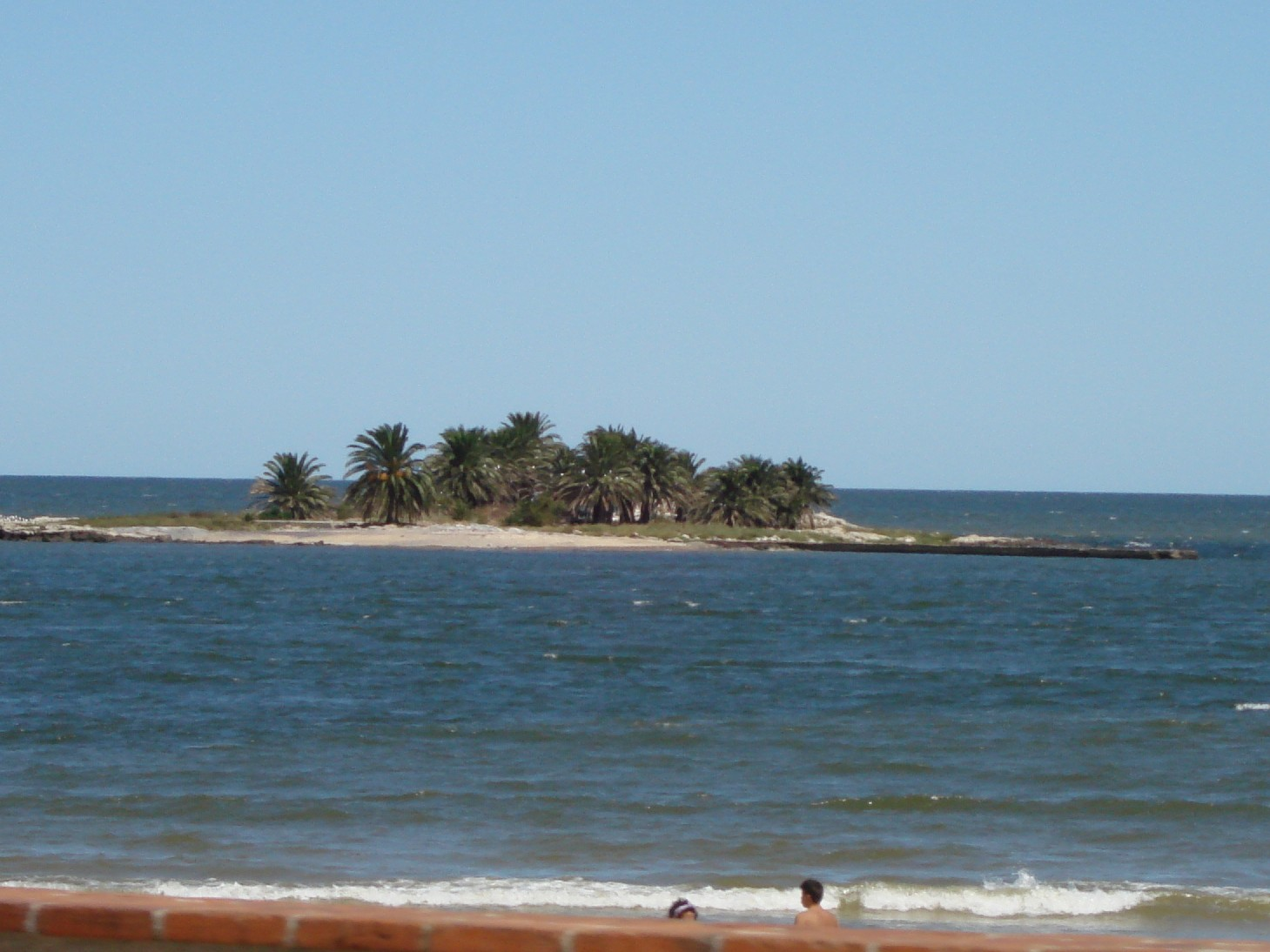
Isla de las Gaviotas as seen from the Rambla of Montevideo.

Seagulls Island (Spanish: Isla de las Gaviotas) is an islet in the Río de la Plata, on the shores of Montevideo, Uruguay (at a distance of 300 m from the coastline).

It is a birdwatching site, with the following species recorded:

- Ardeola ibis
- Casmerodius albus
- Columba livia
- Egretta thula
- Fregata magnificens
- Fulica armillata
- Haematopus palliatus
- Larus dominicanus
- Chroicocephalus maculipennis
- Nycticorax nycticorax
- Nannopterum brasilianum
- Pitangus sulphuratus
- Tyrannus savana
- Macronectes giganteus
