= Las Cruces, California =

Archaic placename in Santa Barbara County, California

- Unincorporated community
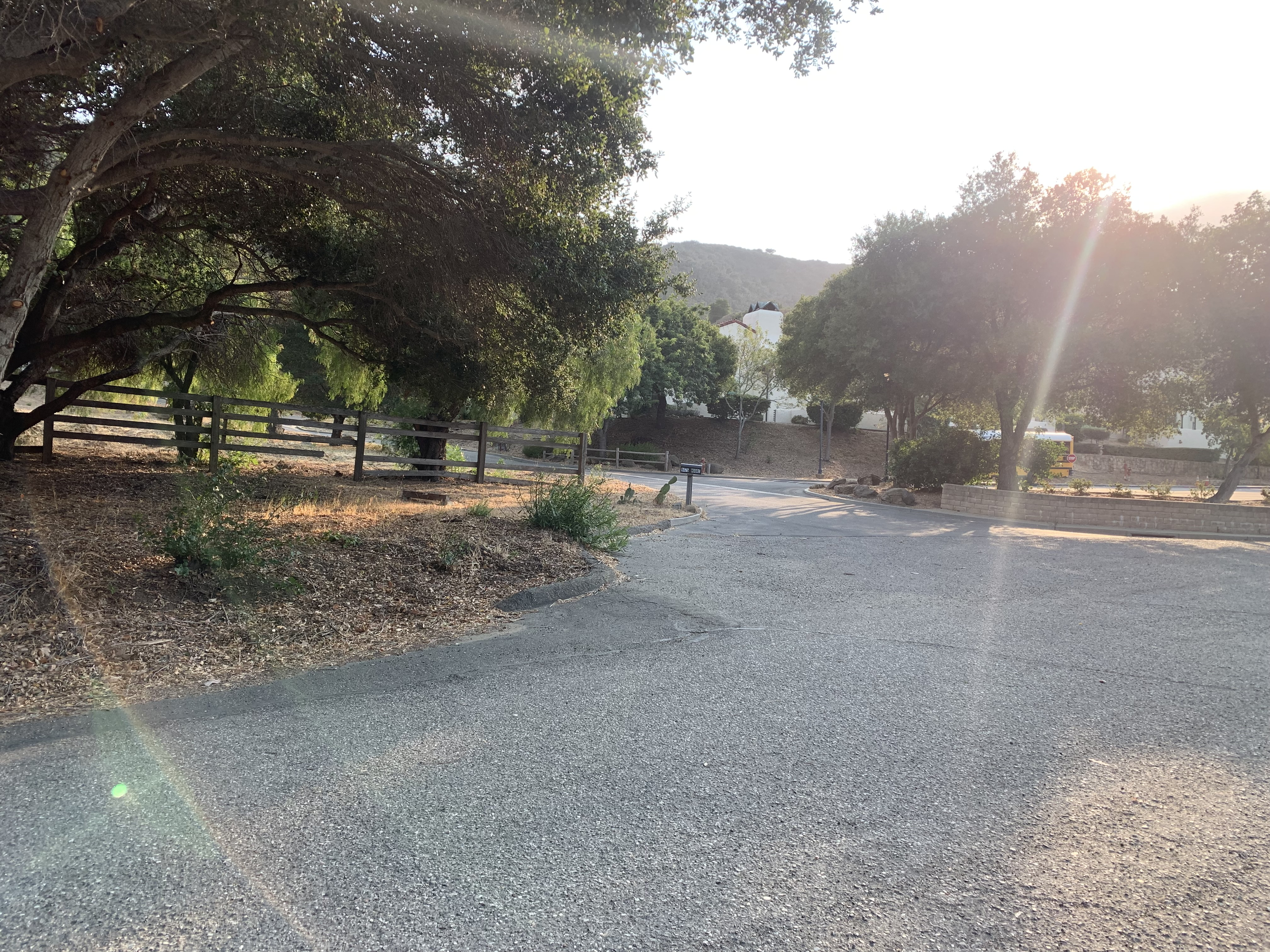
- Las Cruces, August 2021

- Location within California
- Coordinates: 34°30′29″N 120°13′45″W
- Country: United States
- State: California
- County: Santa Barbara
- Elevation: 341 ft (104 m)
- Time zone: UTC-8 (Pacific (PST))
  - Summer (DST): UTC-7 (PDT)
- Area codes: 805 & 820
- GNIS feature ID: 1660894

Las Cruces (sometimes rendered Las Cruses, meaning the crosses in Spanish) is a former settlement and an archaic placename in Santa Barbara County, California, United States. It lies at the split between California State Route 1, which travels north to Lompoc, and U.S. Route 101, which travels north to Buellton. The two routes run concurrently on the highway to the south through the Gaviota Gorge to the Gaviota Coast. The community is served by area code 805.

== History ==
There was a post office at Las Cruces as early as 1876. The spot has long been a crossroads for travellers along the Central Coast. In the 19th century, Las Cruces "was an overnight stop-over for farmers delivering grain and other crops from the Santa Ynez Valley to the Gaviota Wharf."

Gaviota Hot Springs were originally known as Las Cruces Hot Springs because of its proximity to the village. Locals used the springs for bathing.

According to the 1941 American Guide to Santa Barbara, the settlement, "shaded by immense old sycamores, [was] a cluster of homes about an inn, a wayside store, and a garage. The spot was once a gathering place for early-California cattlemen who took their cattle through the pass and down to the old Gaviota Landing for shipment. In still earlier times, the region was a battleground during the tenacious wars between the coastal tribes and the Tulare Indians from the San Joaquín Valley." The population of Las Cruces in 1941 was 64 people. Las Cruces was fairly busy during World War II, when it attracted visitors from Camp Cooke, now Vandenberg Space Force Base. It was said to have been a "small community" as of the 1950s. The village is said to have been "obliterated" by highway construction. The Las Cruces village store was demolished in December 1967 to make way for the interchange.

== Additional images ==
History of Las Cruces, California
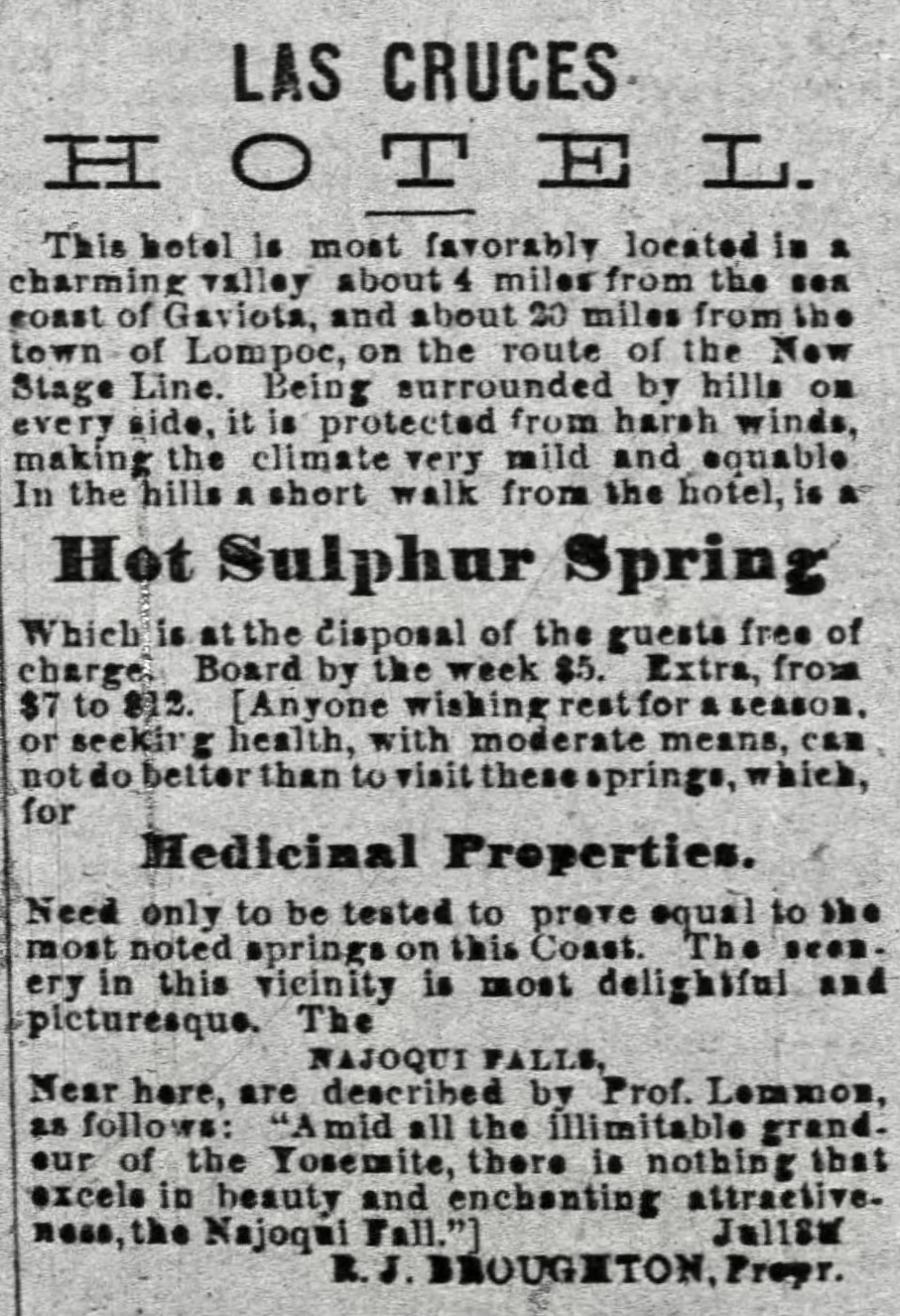
Las Cruces Hotel advertised its proximity to Las Cruces Hot Springs and Nojoqui Falls (The Lompoc Record, Dec. 18, 1880)

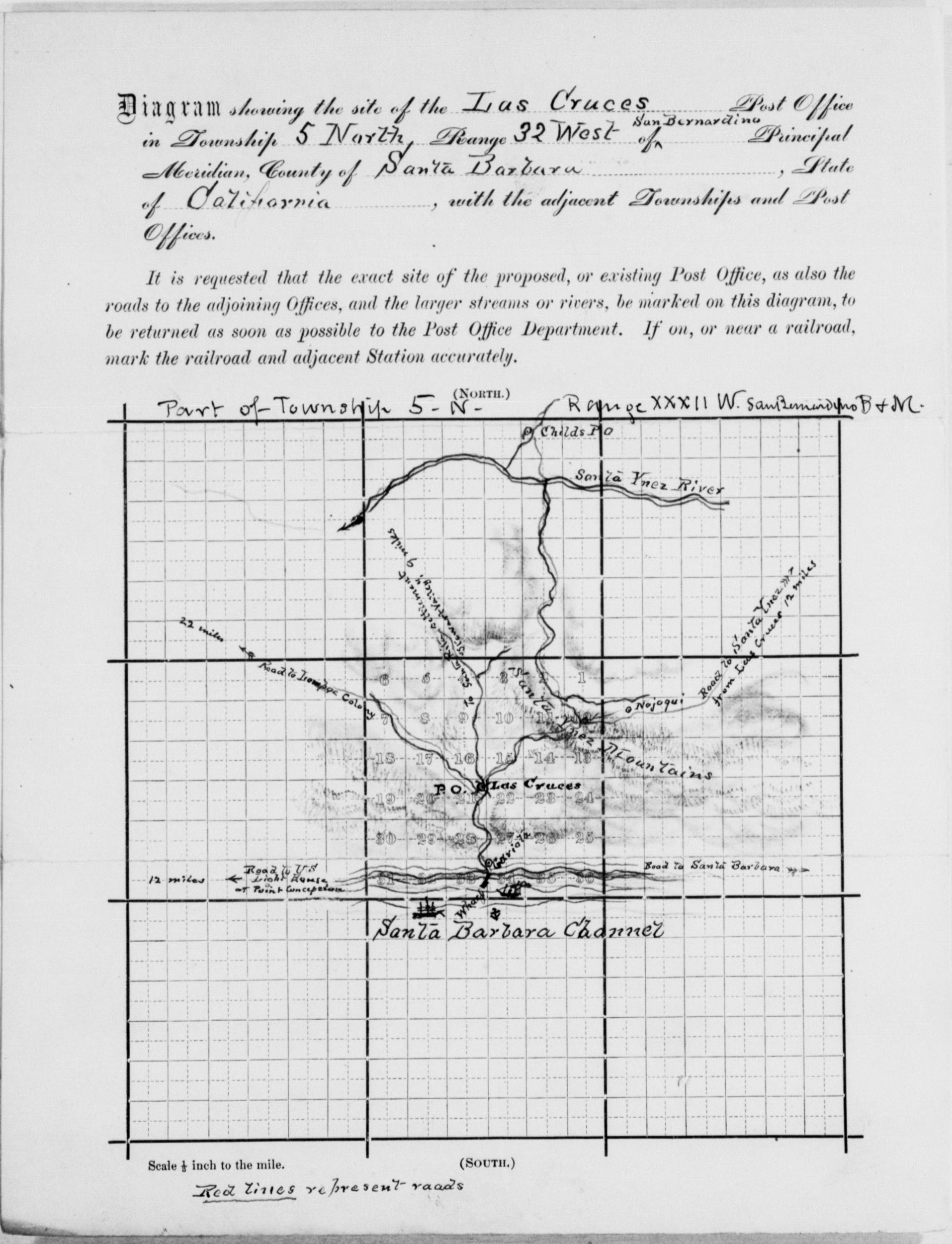
Las Cruces, California location map submitted to the U.S. Post Office Department in 1885
