= Gaviota niobrara =

Gaviota niobrara Temporal range: Pliocene

Scientific classification
- Domain: Eukaryota
- Kingdom: Animalia
- Phylum: Chordata
- Class: Aves
- Order: Charadriiformes
- Family: Laridae
- Genus: †Gaviota; Miller & Sibley, 1941
- Species: †G. niobrara

Binomial name
- †Gaviota niobrara Miller & Sibley, 1941

Extinct species of gull

Gaviota niobrara is an extinct species of gull that lived during the Miocene.

== Etymology ==
The genus name Gaviota derives from the Spanish word for gull. The species name niobrara derives from the Ponca language, referring to the Niobrara River, along which the type specimen was found in Cherry County, Nebraska.

== Description ==
Gaviota niobrara is the only known member of the genus Gaviota. Gaviota is distinguished by the distal position and relatively short length of the ectepicondylar spur and the position of pronator brevis. These characteristics resemble those of Scolopacidae, suggesting a closer relation between gulls and sandpipers in the Miocene. The humerus size of Gaviota niobrara is similar to that of the glaucous gull (Larus hyperboreus).
