= California State Route 144 =

State highway in California

State Route 144
- SR 144 highlighted in red

Route information
- Maintained by Caltrans
- Length: 1.06 mi (1.71 km)

Major junctions
- South end: Alameda Padre Serra (Five Points Roundabout) in Santa Barbara
- North end: SR 192 in Santa Barbara

Location
- Country: United States
- State: California
- Counties: Santa Barbara

Highway system
- State highways in California; Interstate; US; State; Scenic; History; Pre‑1964; Unconstructed; Deleted; Freeways
← SR 143	→ SR 145

State Route 144 (SR 144) is a state highway in the U.S. state of California that runs through the Sycamore Canyon in Santa Barbara. It travels along Sycamore Canyon Road from its intersection with Alameda Padre Serra at the Five Points Roundabout to Stanwood Drive (State Route 192). Though some signs and maps may continue to mark SR 144 running further south to U.S. Route 101, control of that segment of the highway was relinquished to the city and is thus no longer officially part of the state highway system.

== Route description ==
Route 144 is defined in section 444, subsection (a), of the California Streets and Highways Code, and that the highway is "from Alameda Padre Serra in Santa Barbara to Route 192 via Sycamore Canyon Road". Subsections (b) and (c) permit the state to relinquish control of the highway to the city. And while control of the southern segment of highway between Route 101 and Alameda Padre Serra has already been relinquished, subdivision (d) further mandates that the city must still "maintain within its jurisdiction signs directing motorists to the continuation of Route 144".

State Route 144 begins at a roundabout called the Five Points Roundabout, connecting Alameda Padre Serra's eastern and western segments with Montecito Street, Salinas Street, and Sycamore Canyon Road. From the roundabout, State Route 144 continues north onto Sycamore Canyon Road, a winding two-lane road between steep hillsides to its terminus with State Route 192/Stanwood Drive.

SR 144 is not part of the National Highway System, a network of highways that are considered essential to the country's economy, defense, and mobility by the Federal Highway Administration.

== History ==
The highway used to begin at U.S. Route 101's interchange with Milpas Street. From there, SR 144 headed northwest on Milpas, a conventional 4-lane thoroughfare. In less than four blocks, however, the route then turned northeast on Mason Street, a two-lane residential street, passing by an elementary school and through a narrow bridge crossing the Sycamore Creek. Mason Street ends at Salinas Street; at this intersection, the route turned northwest onto Salinas Street, another two-lane street, until it reached the Five Points Roundabout.

Constructed in 1992, Five Points Roundabout was the State of California highway system's first modern roundabout. The roundabout cost $250,000 to construct and was designed by consulting firm, Ourston & Doctors.

In 1999, the state law was changed to permit the relinquishment of Route 144 to the City of Santa Barbara. This was because the City of Santa Barbara wished to do several improvements on Milpas Street. One of these improvements included the installation of a roundabout at the off-ramp from northbound Route 101, which Caltrans did not approve of. The roundabout controls traffic coming from Milpas Street, Carpinteria Street, and two ramps from and to Route 101. It is a significantly larger and bolder version of the Salinas Street roundabout, though the latter channels five streets. The state law was then changed in 2010 to reflect that only the portion from Route 101 to Five Points Roundabout was relinquished to the city.

The final portion of State Route 144 from Ranchito Vista Road to its junction with State Route 192 had been closed off and on between 2005 and 2012 due to repetitive mudslides. In April 2012, crews completed repairs to the surrounding hillsides and reopened this segment of the highway.

== Major intersections ==
Except where prefixed with a letter, postmiles were measured on the road as it was in 1964, based on the alignment that existed at the time, and do not necessarily reflect current mileage. Postmile prefixes include: R reflecting a realignment in the route since then, M indicating a second realignment, L referring to an overlap due to a correction or change, and T indicating postmiles classified as temporary. Segments that remain unconstructed or have been relinquished to local control may be omitted. The entire route is in Santa Barbara, Santa Barbara County.

Postmile	Destinations	Notes
0.00	Milpas Street	Continuation beyond US 101
0.00	US 101	Interchange; US 101 north exit 96A, south exits 96A-B
0.89	Alameda Padre Serra, Montecito Street	Five Points Roundabout; south end of state maintenance
1.95	SR 192 (Sycamore Canyon Road, Stanwood Drive)	North end of SR 144
1.000 mi = 1.609 km; 1.000 km = 0.621 mi
