= Big Caliente Hot Springs =

Thermal springs

- Little Caliente Hot Springs
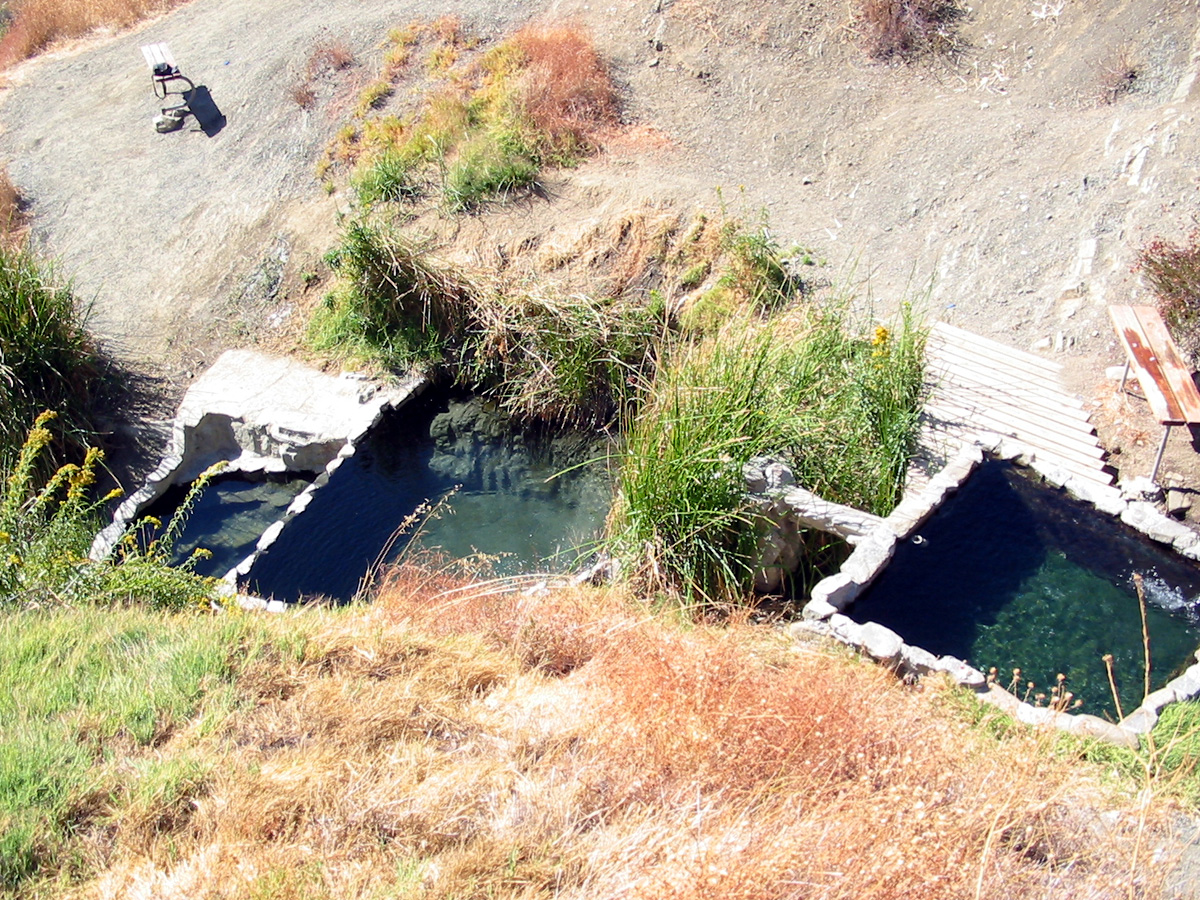
- Little Caliente Hot Springs, 4.8 miles (7.7 km) north from Big Caliente Hot Springs

- Location within California
- Interactive map of Big Caliente Hot Springs
- Location: near Santa Barbara, California
- Coordinates: 34°32′21″N 119°33′53″W
- Elevation: 1,437 feet (438 m)
- Type: geothermal
- Temperature: 105–115 °F (41–46 °C)

Big Caliente Hot Springs are a grouping of thermal mineral springs located in the Los Padres National Forest of California.

== Description ==
The hot spring water emerges at 115 °F (46 °C) from a bluff and flows into a large, deep primitive rock and concrete soaking pool. The temperature of the water can be controlled by adjusting diversion valves. Another primitive soaking pool is located below the spring source, adjacent to the creek. A third soaking pool is located across the creek, with a temperature of 115 °F (46 °C), fed by a different hot spring. The water from these hot springs are rich in soda compounds.

== Location ==
The springs are accessed via a 13.3-mile (21.4 km) hike with many switchbacks. It is possible to drive to the site but it is not recommended as the gravel road tends to wash out and it becomes undrivable. A four-wheel drive vehicle or motorcycle is recommended for the drive up Romero Canyon. The GPS coordinates for Big Caliente Hot Springs are 34°32.353′N 119°33.876′W.

== Little Caliente ==
The Little Caliente hot springs are located 4.8 miles (7.7 km) away at 1,600 feet (490 m). The hot mineral water emerges from the springs at 105 °F (41 °C). There are several primitive rock-lined soaking pools. From Big Caliente, head north at Juncal Campground. The GPS coordinates for Little Caliente hot spring are: 34°32.430′N 119°37.176′W. The spring fluctuates between muddy and clear depending on the season.
