= Gaviota, California =

Unincorporated community in California, United States

- Unincorporated community
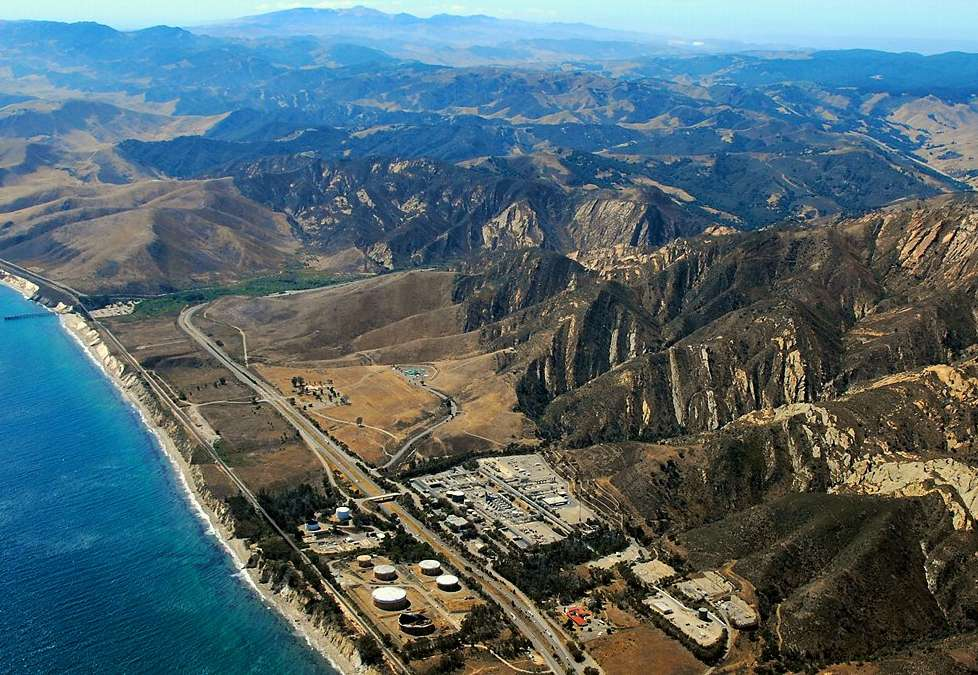
- Gaviota Coast, including the oil installation and much of Gaviota State Park, 2009

- Location within California Location within the United States
- Coordinates: 34°28′18″N 120°12′50″W
- Country: United States
- State: California
- County: Santa Barbara
- Elevation: 102 ft (31 m)
- Time zone: UTC-8 (Pacific (PST))
  - Summer (DST): UTC-7 (PDT)
- Area codes: 805 & 820
- GNIS feature ID: 271285

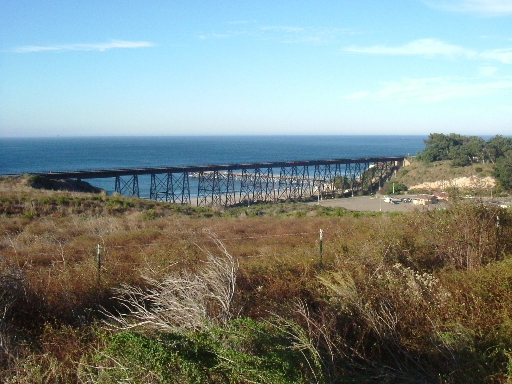
Gaviota railroad trestle and Gaviota Creek

Gaviota (Spanish for "Seagull") is an unincorporated community in Santa Barbara County, California, United States, on the Gaviota Coast approximately 30 miles (48 km) west of Santa Barbara and 15 miles (24 km) south of Buellton.

Gaviota is south and east of Gaviota State Park. The road to Hollister Ranch, the large private land holding along the coast between Gaviota and Point Conception, connects with U.S. 101 just west of Gaviota, at the turnoff to Gaviota State Park.

Industries in the area include organic farming, ranching, and woodworking. Free range cattle can be seen roaming and grazing throughout the area. Gaviota is also home to a marine mammal rehabilitation center named The Channel Islands Marine & Wildlife Institute (CIMWI.org) which opened in 2006 at the historic Vista Del Mar School grounds.

Gaviota was once the location of the Gaviota Marine Terminal, which is currently being decommissioned and abandoned, with intent to become public open space. On the mountain side of the freeway is the Gaviota Oil Heating Facility, also known as the "Gaviota Gas Plant", built by Chevron Corp. and currently owned by Freeport-McMoRan; this facility is being reconfigured and partially abandoned. The former purpose of the facility was to heat and process the heavy crude oil produced offshore so that it could flow through the All American Pipeline to refineries in the Bakersfield area.

== Gaviota Coast ==
The Gaviota Coast remains largely undeveloped and is the longest remaining rural coastline in southern California. In 2016, the twenty-one miles of Highway 101 that runs through the Gaviota Coast, bounded by the City of Goleta’s western boundary and Las Cruces where Route 1, was declared a State Scenic Highway. The preservation of this area is the subject of "The Twenty," a film by The Surfrider Foundation.

Gaviota tarweed, a rare and endangered subspecies (subsp. villosa) of Deinandra increscens endemic to Santa Barbara County, is found here.

== History ==
The first European land exploration of Alta California, the Spanish Portolá expedition, camped at Gaviota Creek on August 24, 1769 (on its way north). On the return journey to San Diego, the party again stopped there on January 6, 1770. Franciscan missionary Juan Crespi noted in his diary, "I called this place San Luis Rey, and the soldiers know it as La Gaviota, because they killed a seagull there." Gaviota is the Spanish word for "seagull".

== Climate ==
Owing to its location on the Pacific Ocean, Gaviota has a mild, coastal Mediterranean climate, with consistent temperatures year-round. Fog is a common feature, especially during summer mornings, but usually burns off by the afternoon.

Climate data for Gaviota, California
Month	Jan	Feb	Mar	Apr	May	Jun	Jul	Aug	Sep	Oct	Nov	Dec	Year
Mean daily maximum °F (°C)	62.7 (17.1)	63.8 (17.7)	64.4 (18.0)	67.0 (19.4)	68.9 (20.5)	70.3 (21.3)	73.0 (22.8)	73.5 (23.1)	73.3 (22.9)	71.6 (22.0)	67.7 (19.8)	63.1 (17.3)	68.3 (20.2)
Mean daily minimum °F (°C)	42.8 (6.0)	44.7 (7.1)	47.0 (8.3)	48.9 (9.4)	52.1 (11.2)	54.9 (12.7)	57.7 (14.3)	57.9 (14.4)	56.7 (13.7)	52.6 (11.4)	46.7 (8.2)	42.7 (5.9)	50.4 (10.2)
Average precipitation inches (mm)	3.70 (94)	4.33 (110)	3.56 (90)	0.79 (20)	0.30 (7.6)	0.05 (1.3)	0.03 (0.76)	0.10 (2.5)	0.41 (10)	0.56 (14)	1.39 (35)	2.36 (60)	17.58 (447)

== See also ==
- Gaviota Tunnel
- Gaviota Peak
