= San Marcos Pass =

Mountain pass in California, United States

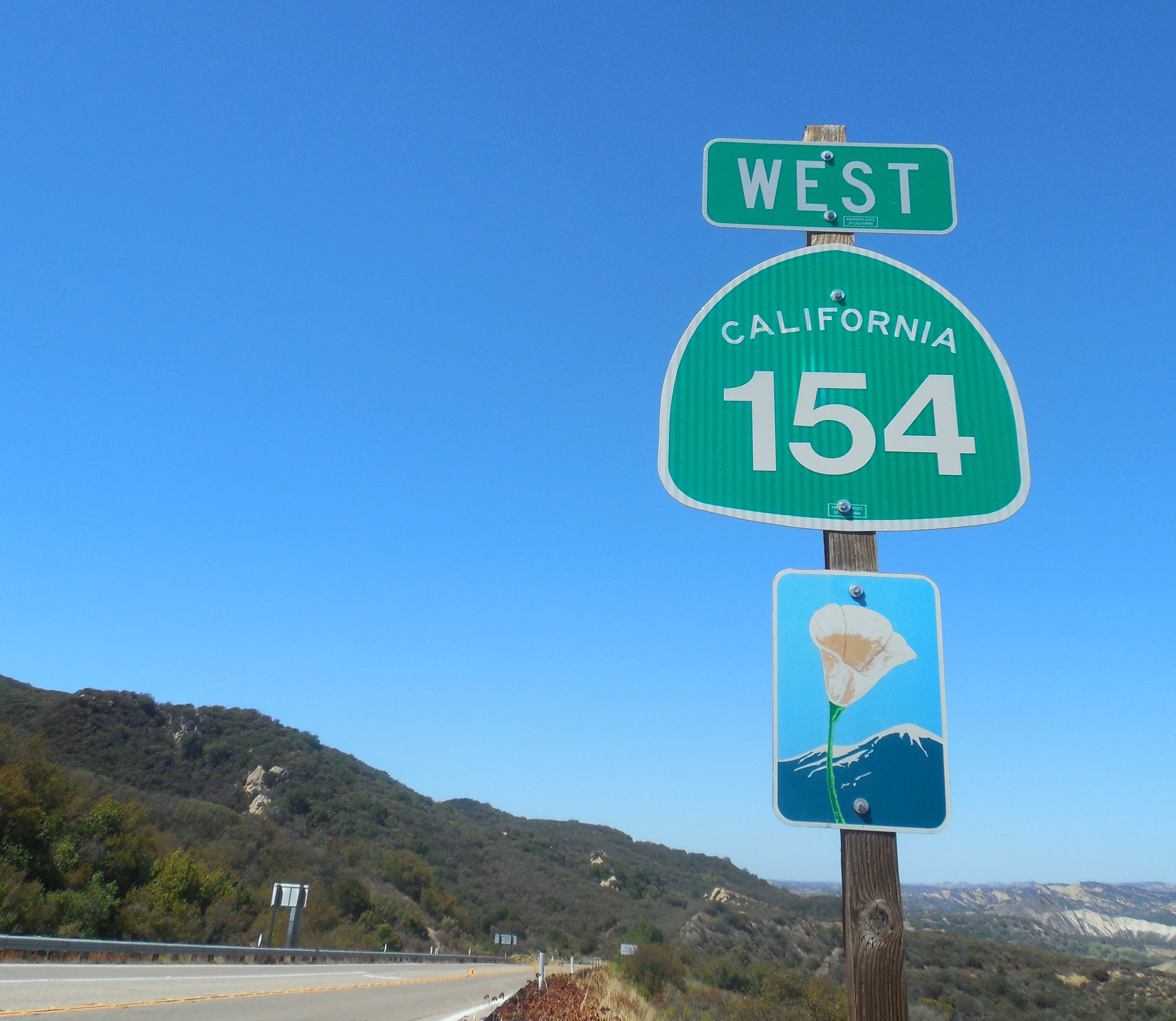
- Along San Marcos Pass Rd., just west of Paradise Rd. in Los Padres National Forest
- Interactive map of San Marcos Pass
- Elevation: 2,225 ft (678 m)
- Traversed by: SR 154

Third Approach
- Location: Santa Barbara County, California, United States
- Range: Santa Ynez Mountains
- Coordinates: 34°30′42″N 119°49′29″W

San Marcos Pass (Chumash: Mistaxiwax) is a mountain pass in the Santa Ynez Mountains in southern California.

It is traversed by State Route 154. The pass crosses the Santa Ynez through a southwestern portion of Los Padres National Forest, and connects Los Olivos (and the Santa Ynez Valley) with Santa Barbara, California along the Pacific coast. The road has been designated as a daylight-headlight highway by the California Highway Patrol and Caltrans because of frequent accidents, particularly around the exit for Lake Cachuma.

== Geography ==
The pass is one of three passages across the steep Santa Ynez Mountains, and the nearest to Santa Barbara. The Painted Cave community and Laurel Springs Ranch near Chumash Painted Cave SHP is four miles east of San Marcos Pass via East Camino Cielo Road, which intersects with SR 154 right at the summit. San Marcos Pass is a shorter but hillier alternative to using Highway 101 through Gaviota Pass. The third option, Refugio, is described as "virtually impassable."

The San Marcos Hot Springs, also known as the Mountain Glen Hot Springs, were located on the north side of the mountains "near the stage road over the San Marcos Pass."

== "Battle" of Fremont's Pass ==
No shots were fired during this "battle", which consisted solely of John C. Frémont's California Battalion crossing the mountains via San Marcos Pass on the night of December 24, 1846, during the Mexican–American War. At that time the pass was only a path, and a rough one at that. It was a rainy night, and while Frémont's battalion had lost 150 horses and mules from sliding down the muddy slopes during the crossing, the exhausted men were able to reach the Goleta Valley foothills by the next morning, where they camped for two days. On December 27, 1846, they entered into Santa Barbara and ran up the Stars and Stripes at the Thompson Adobe (809–811 State Street). No force defended the town: all local men had gone to Los Angeles earlier that week to join the forces under Captain Flores and General Andrés Pico. These forces surrendered to Frémont on January 13, 1847, a little more than two weeks later, at Cahuenga Pass near Los Angeles.

A local Army National Guard center is named after Frémont, in recognition of his capturing Santa Barbara and making it part of the United States.

The local legend of "Frémont's Cannon" derives from this battle.

== In popular culture ==
- Road Trip with Huell Howser Episode 108

== See also ==
- State Route 154
- Cold Spring Canyon Arch Bridge
- Santa Ynez Valley
- Santa Ynez Mountains
- Santa Barbara, California
