= Gaviota Tunnel =

Tunnel along US Route 101 in Gaviota State Park, California, United States

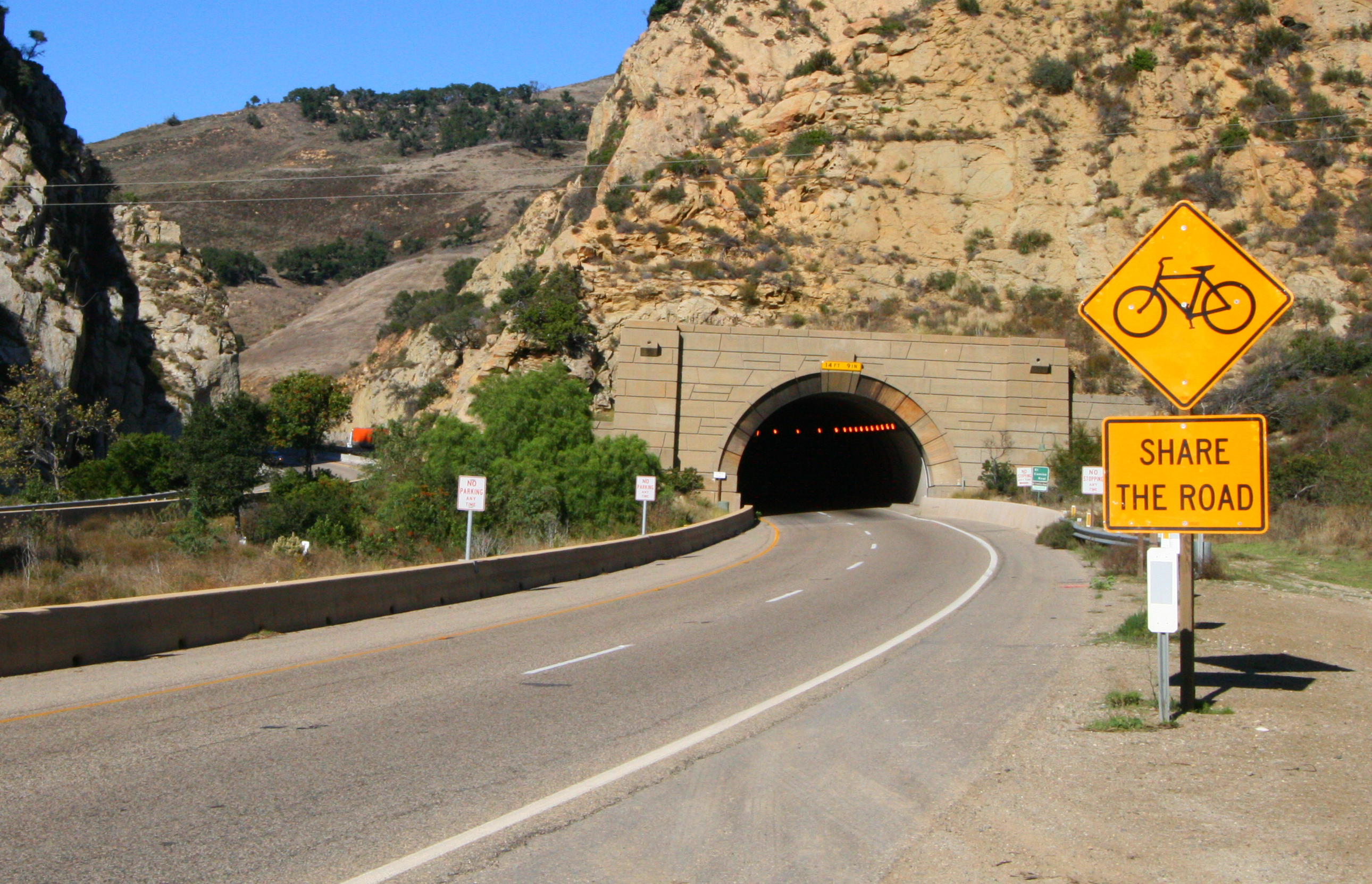

Overview
- Location: Near Gaviota State Park, California
- Coordinates: 34.4888°N 120.226°W
- Route: Northbound lanes of US 101 / SR 1

Operation
- Owner: Caltrans

Technical
- Length: 420 ft (130 m)
- Tunnel clearance: 17.5 ft (5.3 m)

Gaviota Pass
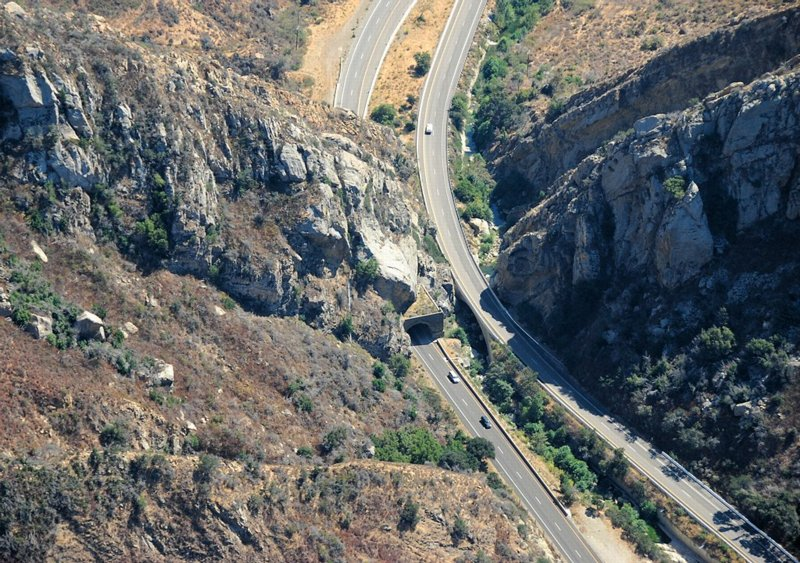
- Gaviota Pass - Aerial view of Gaviota Tunnel
- Interactive map of Gaviota Pass
- Location: Highway 101 North-Bound Rest Stop

California Historical Landmark
- Official name: Gaviota Pass
- Designated: June 2, 1937
- Reference no.: 248

The Gaviota Tunnel (officially known as the Gaviota Gorge Tunnel) is a tunnel on U.S. Route 101/State Route 1 (US 101/SR 1) completed in 1953 in the center of Gaviota State Park, 33 miles (53 km) northwest of Santa Barbara, California, on the Gaviota Coast. It is 420 feet (130 m) long and 17.5 feet (5.3 m) tall. Only the northbound lanes of US 101 pass through it, as the southbound lanes descend from Gaviota Pass through a narrow canyon to the west of the tunnel. Because it is the only major route between the Santa Barbara County South Coast and the Santa Ynez Valley, bicycles are allowed through it. There is a rest area for both southbound and northbound lanes on the southern end of the tunnel, the southernmost one along US 101.

There are frequent rockslides in the area, especially during and following rain. Some of the hillsides and road cuts are covered in netting to prevent erosion. There are also fences made of netting along the roadway to stop rocks that do fall.

An alternate bypass to this section of US 101 between Santa Barbara and Los Olivos is provided by SR 154 capped by the Cold Spring Canyon Arch Bridge near the summit of San Marcos Pass. SR 154 cuts directly between Santa Barbara and Los Olivos in a northwestern direction, whereas US 101 runs along the coast of the Pacific Ocean about 25 miles (40 km) west before turning north passing through Buellton to meet up with SR 154 near Los Olivos.

== History ==
=== Foxen story myth ===
In 1937, Gaviota Pass was originally registered as California Historical Landmark #248. Reportedly on this site during the Mexican–American War on Christmas Day 1846, the Mexican Army waited to ambush the US forces of John C. Frémont. Frémont learned of their plans from Benjamin Foxen, owner of an adobe where Frémont's forces had set up camp. Foxen and his son then guided Frémont's forces over the San Marcos Pass to capture Santa Barbara.

Although it perpetuated throughout the decades since, Santa Barbara historian Walker Tompkins argued that the "Foxen warning Fremont of the ambush" story was a myth. Doing research, including looking through the diaries of Frémont's soldiers, Tompkins stated that Frémont thought up the idea of crossing San Marcos Pass himself, as a way to sneak over the mountain to Santa Barbara. Furthermore, most of the Mexican Army were in Los Angeles, and Gaviota Pass's narrow crevasse combined with the recent storms and the flooding from the Gaviota Creek made it impassable for Frémont's forces anyway. While the diaries of Frémont's soldiers never mention Foxen, local historians still feel that the Foxens could have led Fremont troops over the San Marcos Pass.

By 2022, the California Historical Landmark description was modified to remove any references to the Foxen story and instead "recognize the significance of Gaviota Pass as one of California’s historic mountain passes".

=== Road and tunnel construction ===
After the Mexican–American War and California's statehood, the pass was widened in 1854 to let wagons through. It was further widened in 1861 as the first county road through the pass was completed. The California Division of Highways then took control of the road in 1915. With the increase in traffic, construction on the Gaviota Tunnel began on 1952, and it opened in 1953; to this day, the northbound lanes of the highway pass through the tunnel while the southbound lanes run along the route of original road.

== In popular culture ==
The Gaviota Tunnel was featured in The Graduate, Wayne's World 2, and Sideways and Who Framed Rodger Rabbit. but in the first film, Dustin Hoffman travels the wrong way through the tunnel. In the movie, they are supposed to be going southbound, but go through the tunnel in the northbound direction (the tunnel does not have any southbound lanes). In Wayne’s World 2 and Sideways, Mike Myers and Paul Giamatti with Thomas Haden Church are all heading north, and therefore pass through the tunnel in the correct northbound direction.

The tunnel inspired in Grand Theft Auto V the fictional "Braddock Tunnel" that connects the town of Paleto Bay with the town of Grapeseed.

The tunnel is featured in American Truck Simulator.

== See also ==
- Gaviota Peak
- Gaviota, California
- Santa Ynez Mountains
- Cold Spring Canyon Arch Bridge
- History of Santa Barbara, California
- California Historical Landmarks in Santa Barbara County, California
