= Isla Vista Arts =

Organization at the University of California

Isla Vista Arts (shortened to IV Arts) is an organization at the University of California, Santa Barbara with the goal of promoting art and culture in the small, neighboring community of Isla Vista, California. It is affiliated with the UCSB Interdisciplinary Humanities Center and Associated Students. Isla Vista Arts provides free and low-cost entertainment to college students and community members.

Programs include I.V. Live, Magic Lantern Films, WORD Magazine, the BOX, and Nuestra Voz, which are also available to UCSB students as courses. I.V. Live produces the weekly comedy show Improvability and the yearly event Shakespeare in the Park. Isla Vista Arts also helps promote and advertise local student initiatives in art, self-expression, comedy, theater, and more.

== Programs ==
=== Magic Lantern Films ===
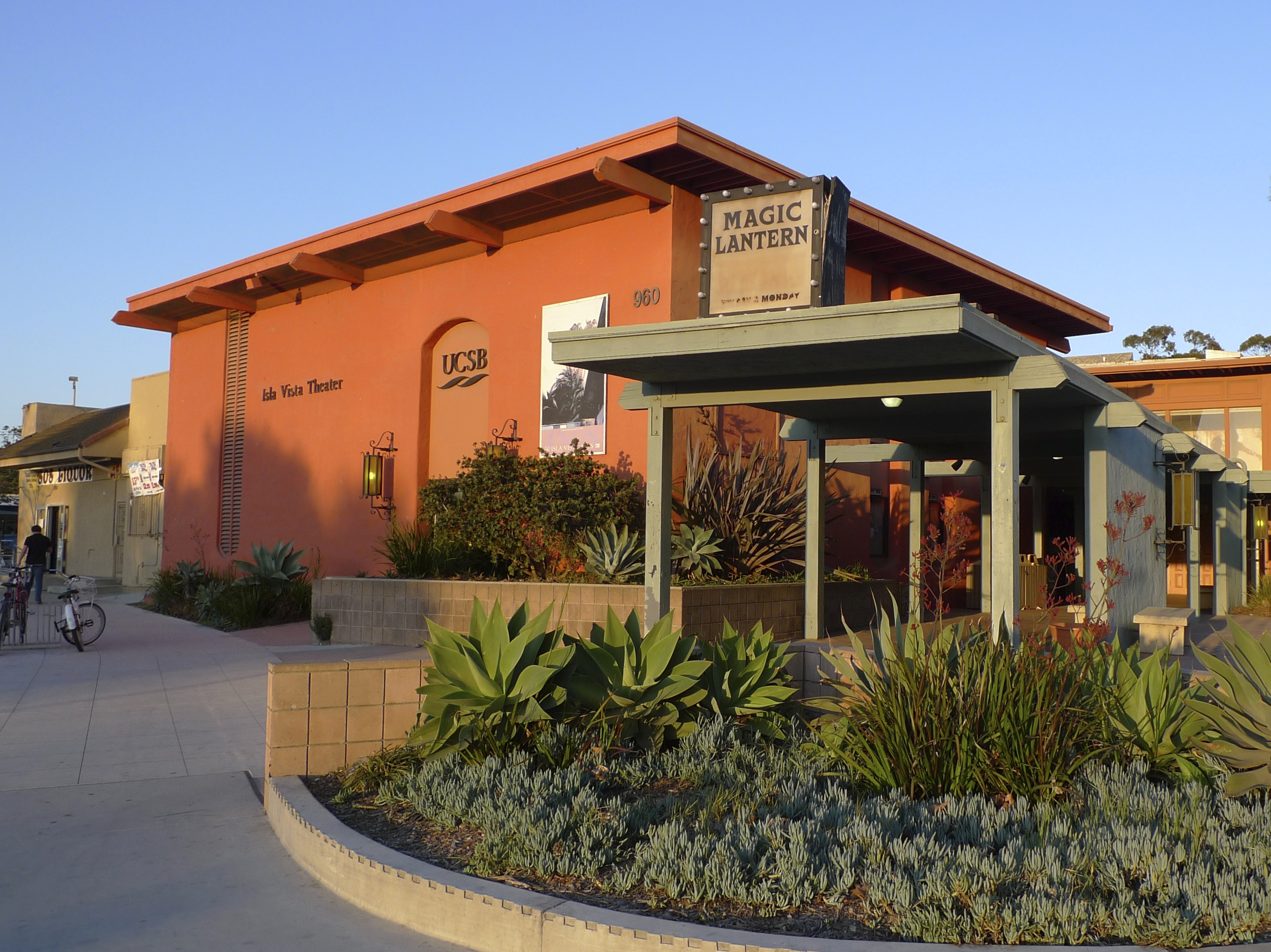
Isla Vista Theater: formerly the Magic Lantern movie theater, now UCSB lecture halls and location of Magic Lantern Films

Magic Lantern Films began in 2004 and presents movies on Friday and Monday nights in the Isla Vista Theater. It says that the film distributors Swank and Criterion, who specialize in college markets, said this is the most successful film program of its kind in California. Magic Lantern Films is linked to the course Film and Media Studies 119 at UCSB, and it teaches students how to produce and manage a film festival.

Magic Lantern Films takes its name from the old Magic Lantern Theater, now the Isla Vista Theater. In the 1960s, the Magic Lantern was an art house that screened classic, independent, and foreign films.

Don Hertzfeldt, a UCSB graduate, started his tour of I Am So Proud of You at a Magic Lantern screening.

=== I.V. Live and Improvability ===
I.V. Live began as a variety show in 2004 and has grown into Improvability, a weekly improvisation show. In addition to UCSB and SBCC students, Isla Vista residents are welcomed to this family-friendly show.

I.V. Live began as an initiative by UCSB theater professor Catherine Cole to provide cultural options beyond parties for students. It became a regular course in the Theater and Dance department at UCSB. I.V. Live is both a production course (THTR 42/142) sponsored by the Department of Theater and Dance and an Office of Student Life campus organization, a hybrid of academics and community service.

=== WORD: Isla Vista Arts and Culture Magazine ===
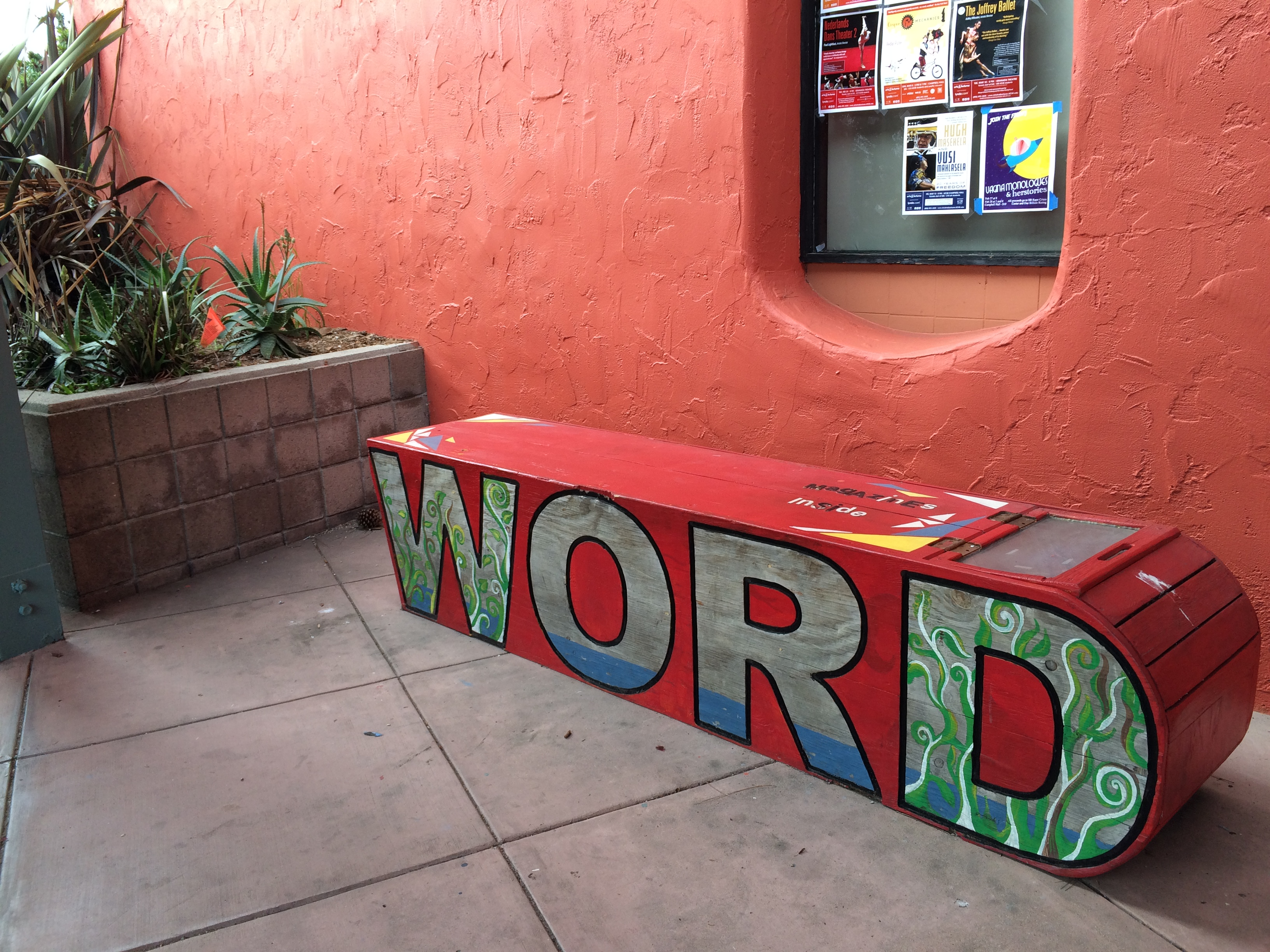
WORD bench by Isla Vista Theater on Trigo Road

WORD is a quarterly arts and culture magazine published by the UCSB course INT 185ST and partnered with the Office of Student Life. WORD is distributed for free in news stands in front of local businesses in Isla Vista and in the “WORD bench” in front of I.V. Theater. The magazine discusses I.V. music, arts, and local interests. It also has photography and recipes.

WORD was started in Fall 2007 when Kim Yasuda, a UCSB art professor, discovered a copy of Isla Vista magazine I.V. Lifestyle, which depicted local life with sexist images and as a culture preoccupied with alcohol binging. Spurred by what she found to be an inaccurate representation of Isla Vista living, Yasuda established WORD with the help of Isla Vista Arts' Acting Director, Ellen Anderson, and Santa Barbara Independent longtime contributor D.J. Palladino as a way to redefine misconceptions of Isla Vista culture. By its second issue in Winter 2008, the magazine had earned the title of “Most Creative UCSB Organization” by the UCSB Office of Student Life. Palladino is an advisor to the project.

In 2012 and 2013, WORD hosted a public music festival in Isla Vista to promote local art and culture.

=== Shakespeare in the Park ===
Shakespeare in the Park is a program that brings classical drama to Isla Vista. Founded by graduate student Jason Narvy, and produced by I.V. Live, Shakespeare in the Park is a free, family-friendly production in the Anisq'Oyo' Park amphitheater. In winter 2008, Isla Vista Arts premiered Shakespeare in the Park's first production of Julius Caesar, an hour-long, abridged version of the tragedy. In spring 2008, a production of Twelfth Night was presented in the park. In spring 2010, McBeth was brought to the stage, which combined the language of Shakespeare's Macbeth with commedia dell'arte. In spring 2011, they presented The Merry Wives of Windsor. In June 2015, they put on a production of The Tempest with creative choices for costuming and casting.

=== Nuestra Voz ===
Nuestra Voz, which means “our voice” in Spanish, brings school students from the Isla Vista Teen Center together with UCSB Drama students to collaborate and create original theatrical works. Nuestra Voz began in 2005 as a solo performance festival.

The partnership between UCSB and the Isla Vista Teen Center continued with "The Monument Project" in May 2006. Isla Vista teenagers teamed with senior citizens and UCSB students to create prototype monuments for their community. The Monument Project was presented in conjunction with the University of California Institute for Research in the Arts (UCIRA) conference hosted by UCSB.

In the spring of 2007, local high school students created a performance in conjunction with the students in UCSB's course "Teatro as a Teaching Tool". The performance, titled Mosaic, was produced on June 2 in Embarcadero Hall.

In 2008, Nuestra Voz produced "Isla Vista: The Video Game", a play about the importance of the Isla Vista Teen Center after it was closed due to damage. They performed it for local elected officials and community leaders.

In the summer of 2009, 14 teens spent 5 weeks in UCSB’s Studio Theater. They wrote, rehearsed, danced, built sets, and handled lighting and sound equipment.

== History ==
IV Arts began as part of UCSB's response to the 2001 Isla Vista killings, providing weekend evening activities for students as an alternative to alcohol-centered events. On the evening of the 2014 Isla Vista killings, IV Arts was hosting its weekly improv comedy show, and it locked the doors of the theater and continued performing beyond the scheduled end time to protect and keep occupied the college students and local school children in the audience.

IV Arts is supported by a fee paid by UCSB students.
