= Isla Vista Municipal Advisory Council =

The Isla Vista Municipal Advisory Council was a local government agency in the Isla Vista district of Santa Barbara County, California. It was among the first Municipal Advisory Councils of California, elected representative bodies created in 1970/1971 in certain localities in response to riots.

== Background ==
The State of California created a new special form of local government agency in 1970 with the creation of Municipal Advisory Councils, legislation enacted in response to the increasing frequency of violent race riots and other disturbances in its urban settings. The new legislation was intended to empower local unincorporated communities and their involvement in policy decisions resulting in the provision of standard municipal services in areas distant to elected officials and seats of local government.

== First Municipal Advisory Councils ==
Among the first counties in the State to enable Municipal Advisory Councils (MACs) were Santa Barbara and San Mateo, which set up Councils in Isla Vista and in East Palo Alto in response to extensive riots in these unincorporated areas. These two MAC's became the most well-known examples in the State of this new form of quasi-representative government. The Isla Vista Municipal Advisory Council held its first election in early 1971 with nine local residents of the student community elected to the government with funding from the County of Santa Barbara to finance its operations. The new Council members elected were a mix of university students, local property owners and owners of commercial outlets, although this mix of residents is not legally mandated. In the same year, the County formed another special district with the creation of the Isla Vista Recreation and Park District.

The state legislation authorized the election of local community members in specified unincorporated areas of counties and the placement of such elections on the official ballot as well community issues to be voted on in a plebiscite. Upon election of nine residents, the Santa Barbara County Board of Supervisors appointed the same members, by official resolution, to the open seats on Isla Vista Municipal Advisory Council (IVMAC) for a one-year term. Six of the seats were determined by district elections while three remaining positions were at-large seats. Council members were eligible for re-election and re-appointment Council members were first elected to the Isla Vista Community Council. The enabling State legislation also provided for local plebiscites on planning, land use and economic development issues of community importance.
