= Kim Yasuda =

American artist (born 1960)

Kim Teru Yasuda
- Born: 1960 (age 65–66); Oakland, California
- Education: B.F.A., San Jose State University; M.F.A., University of Southern California
- Known for: Sculpture, Public Art, Site-Specific Art, Social Practice

Kim Teru Yasuda (born 1960) is an American artist known for her sculptures, site-specific installations and public art projects exploring themes of memory, identity, and social engagement in public spaces.

== Work ==
Born in Oakland, California, Yasuda is a professor of Public Practice in the Art Department at University of California, Santa Barbara and previously served as the co-director of the UC Institute for Research in the Arts (UCIRA). She obtained her B.F.A. from San Jose State University in 1983 and her M.F.A. from the University of Southern California in 1988.

Yasuda has received fellowships and awards from the National Endowment for the Arts, the Joan Mitchell Foundation, and the Anonymous Was a Woman Foundation. Her work has been exhibited at the New Museum of Contemporary Art, New York, the Smithsonian American Art Museum, Washington D.C., the Oakland Museum of Art, California and Camerawork Gallery, London.

Yasuda has received commissions for public art from the Metropolitan Transit Authority of Los Angeles as well as the cities of St. Louis, San Jose and Hollywood. Yasuda incorporates a variety of media in her work, including light, which she has used to signify memory or a depiction of one's interior landscape.

Her artistic practice and teaching is open and collaborative, often engaging her students directly with communities where the art projects are situated. In 2008 Yasuda established WORD Magazine, a student-run arts and culture magazine associated with a UCSB class and part of Isla Vista Arts, as a way to redefine misconceptions of Isla Vista. Following the 2014 Isla Vista killings, Yasuda developed a class for UCSB students called IVOpenLab to facilitate students' active learning within the Isla Vista community through social engagement, research, and participation.
