= Municipal advisory council =

A municipal advisory council in the United States is an organization composed of elected or appointed members whose purpose is to advise a city or county government about the activities and problems of the area represented.

In California state government, for example, the councils serve unincorporated communities as links to county boards of supervisors under authorization of a 1971 legislative statute, amended in 1978.

Such a council is an advisory body of local citizens elected by the community or appointed by the board of supervisors with the purpose of representing the community to the board. Although a municipal advisory council is a governing body, it has no fiscal authority or administrative organization. Because it lacks authority to implement its position directly, it seeks to accomplish its goals through county government.

A number of these Municipal Advisory Councils, such as East Palo Alto and Isla Vista, have initiated incorporation proposals to create new cities out of formerly unincorporated areas. The former succeeded in 1999 while the later failed twice in 1974 and 1976 and remains orphaned

These councils face two ways: toward the county, offering the views of the community; and toward the community, supplying information about county proposals and a place where individuals can air opinions on community problems and perhaps receive help. The councils hold public meetings, survey community opinion and speak for the community to the board of supervisors. The most common subject of activity is land-use planning. The county often uses the group as a planning advisory council to draft or revise the community's portion of the county general plan.

In 1977, the California State Office of Planning and Research conducted an extensive study on Municipal Advisory Councils up to that point evaluating their effectiveness and usefulness. Beth Meyerson-Martinez studied MACs again in her Fall 1985 thesis "Municipal Advisory Councils: An Alternative for the Unincorporated Community" focusing specifically on Stanislaus County. There has been little substantive research on the subject since then.

== Controversy ==
Some residents of unincorporated communities represented by MAC boards have raised concerns about their representatives being appointed rather than elected. This issue arises time and again with Alameda County's Castro Valley MAC, which is purported to be composed of the appointing supervisor's campaign donors. This issue of "elected vs. appointed" arose in Stanislaus County in November 2018 when the county sent letters to their MACs notifying them this change would be implemented. After some protests, Stanislaus County decided to let their MAC boards vote on the issue in January and February 2019.

== List of municipal advisory councils ==
=== California ===
- Alamo, Contra Costa,
- Bay Point, Contra Costa,
- Bethel Island, Contra Costa,
- Bloomington, San Bernardino County
- Byron, Contra Costa,
- Cascadel Woods, Madera County, 1984
- Castro Valley, Alameda County, 1981
- Contra Costa Centre, Contra Costa,
- Denair, Stanislaus County, 1992,
- Donner Summit, Placer County, 2010
- East Richmond Heights, Contra Costa, 2017
- El Mirage, San Bernardino County
- El Sobrante, Contra Costa,
- Foresthill Forum, Placer County, 2005
- Granite Bay, Placer County, 2005
- Greater Eureka Area, Humboldt County,
- Hickman, Stanislaus, 1994
- Inyokern, Kern County, 1983
- Kensington, Contra Costa,
- Knights Ferry, Stanislaus, 1983
- Keyes, Stanislaus, 1994
- Knightsen, Contra Costa,
- McKinleyville, Humboldt County,
- Meadow Vista, Placer County, 1989
- Midcoast Community Council, San Mateo County, 1991
- Middletown Area, Lake County, 2006
- Mountain Communities, Kern County, 2009
- North Auburn, Placer County
- North Fair Oaks Community Council Council, San Mateo County, 1990
- North Richmond, Contra Costa,
- North Tahoe, Placer County, 1989
- Oak Hills, San Bernardino County
- Olympic Valley, Placer County
- Pacheco, Contra Costa,
- Pescadero, San Mateo County, 1992
- Rodeo, Contra Costa,
- Rosamond, Kern County, 2005
- Salida, Stanislaus County, 1984
- Searles Valley-Trona , San Bernardino County
- South Modesto, Stanislaus, 2006
- Temescal Canyon, Riverside County
- Tehachapi, Kern County, 2010
- Valley Home, Stanislaus, 2007
- Weimer–Applegate–Colfax, Placer County, 2005
- Winchester-Homeland, Riverside County, 2011
- Wood Colony, Stanislaus County, 2017
- Wrightwood, San Bernardino County
