= Thor Christiansen =

American serial killer (1957–1981)

- Mugshot of Christiansen
- Born: Thor Nis Christiansen; December 28, 1957; Denmark
- Died: March 30, 1981 (aged 23); Folsom State Prison, Folsom, California, U.S.
- Cause of death: Stab wound to chest
- Other names: The Hitchhiker Slayer; The Look-Alike Murderer
- Penalty: Life imprisonment

Details
- Victims: 4
- Span of crimes: November 20, 1976 – April 18, 1979
- Country: United States
- State: California
- Weapon: .22 caliber pistol
- Date apprehended: July 11, 1979

Thor Nis Christiansen (December 28, 1957 – March 30, 1981) was a Danish-American serial killer and necrophile from Solvang, California, who committed the murders of four women in southern California between 1976 and 1979. He committed his first three murders in Isla Vista, which motivated large demonstrations opposed to violence against women and in favor of better transportation for the young people residing in Isla Vista. He later attacked two further women in Los Angeles, killing one while the other escaped with a bullet in her head, and later identified him in a Los Angeles bar.

== Early life ==
Thor Nis Christiansen was born in Denmark, and immigrated to the United States with his parents when he was five years old. The family initially settled in Inglewood, California, and then moved to Solvang, where his father, Nis, ran a restaurant. Christiansen was a good student until his junior year of high school, when he began neglecting his schoolwork. He moved out of his parents' house, dropped out of school, and began working as a gas station attendant. During this time, Christiansen gained a great deal of weight, at one point weighing 275 pounds (125 kg).

== Murders ==
Christiansen's modus operandi was to pick up hitchhikers, shoot them in the head with a .22 caliber pistol, and sexually assault them post-mortem. His victims had long, straight hair, wore similar clothing, and had about the same build. Accordingly, the killings in Isla Vista were dubbed the "look-alike" murders.

On January 20, 1977, the body of Jacqueline Rook, 21, was found, shot in the head, in Refugio Canyon near Santa Barbara. She was last seen on November 20, 1976.

On May 22, 1977, the remains of Mary Sarris, 19, were discovered in a remote area near Los Alamos Canyon. She had been missing since December 6, 1976.

On January 19, 1977, Patricia Laney, 21, was found shot to death, the day after she was reported missing, in Refugio Canyon near Santa Barbara.

On May 26, 1979, the decomposed body of Laura Benjamin, 22, was found in a drainage culvert near Big Tujunga Dam. She was shot twice in the head, sometime in April.

On April 18, 1979, Christiansen offered Lydia Preston, 24, a ride. Minutes later, he shot her in the ear. Preston jumped out of the car and made it to the hospital; the bullet was removed and she recovered. On July 11, 1979, Preston spotted Christiansen at a bar in Hollywood. She reported the sighting to police and he was later arrested.

== Arrest ==
On July 27, 1979, after interviewing more than 115 people over the previous two years, police arrested Christiansen for the murders of Patricia Laney, Jacqueline Rook, and Mary Sarris. He was held in a Santa Barbara County jail on $500,000 bond. He caught the attention of investigators in February 1977, when he was cited for being a minor in possession of liquor. The citation noted that Christiansen had a .22 caliber pistol in his car, which was confiscated by the police. However, his arrest came about when Lydia Preston called investigators on July 11, 1979, stating she saw her attacker at a bar in Hollywood.

On August 20, 1979, Christiansen was charged with the murder of Laura Benjamin. The following day, he was charged with the attempted murder of Lydia Preston.

== Trial ==
On December 26, 1979, Christiansen entered a plea of "not guilty by reason of insanity," in addition to his previous "not guilty" plea. He was scheduled to stand trial in Los Angeles on February 4, 1980, for the 1977 murder of Laura Benjamin, and in Santa Barbara on March 17, 1980, for the Isla Vista murders.

=== Los Angeles trial ===
Following a delay, on March 24, 1980, Christiansen withdrew his double plea in favor of a diminished capacity defense. However, on April 16, 1980, Christiansen was found guilty of first-degree murder and assault, after a psychiatrist testified that Christiansen displayed some degree of "provisional planning."

During the trial, a psychiatric evaluation of Christiansen revealed he suffered from an "intermittent explosive disorder," a paranoid personality, chronic drug use, and necrophilia. Christiansen also said he killed his victims, took them to a secluded place, unclothed them, and sexually explored their bodies. On May 14, 1980, Christiansen was sentenced to 25 years to life for the murder of Laura Benjamin, and 9 years for the attempted murder of Lydia Preston.

=== Santa Barbara trial ===
To the prosecution's surprise, when the trial began on May 28, 1980, Christiansen pleaded guilty to all three counts of murder. The plea change came just weeks after the Los Angeles trial, where Christiansen was found sane by six out of at least seven psychiatrists. On June 18, 1980, Christiansen was sentenced to life in a maximum security prison.

== Death ==
On March 30, 1981, Christiansen died after being stabbed once in the chest while walking in the exercise yard at Folsom State Prison. His killer was not identified.

== Aftermath ==
Patricia Laney has become a prominent symbol for groups that advocate against violence to women in the Santa Barbara/Goleta/Isla Vista area. She had been a community volunteer with organizations that advocated against violence to women. The Isla Vista Juggling Festival has been held annually in her memory since 1977, and is still active as of 2024.

== See also ==
- List of serial killers in the United States
- List of unsolved murders (1980–1999)

== Sources ==
- Los Angeles Times: Jan. 20, 1977 p. B26; Jan. 21, 1977 p. 3; Jan. 21, 1977 p. B23; Jan. 26, 1977 p. A3; May 25, 1977 p. B3;Jul. 28, 1979 p. B1; Aug. 21, 1979 p. C8; Sep. 12, 1979, p. B2; Dec. 11, 1979, p. C7; Feb. 15, 1980, p. B2; May 15, 1980, p. B25; Jun. 8, 1980, p. H2; Mar. 31, 1981, p. C.
- Santa Barbara News-Press: Jan. 20, 1977 p. A1; Jan. 21, 1977 p. A1; Jan. 22, 1977 p. A1; Jan. 23, 1977 p. A1; Jan. 24, 1977 p. A1; Jan. 25, 197 p. A1, p. C12; Jul. 27, 1979 p. A1; Jul. 27, 1979 p. A1; Jun. 18, 1980 p. B1; Mar. 31, 1981.
- YouTube: "The Hitchhiker Slayer"
- SB Juggler's
