= Community federal credit union =

Member-owned local financial cooperative

A community federal credit union, is a credit union in the United States that are based upon the cooperative concept but differs in its scope of membership in that it is based on geographical membership. Unlike the majority of credit unions, the community credit union is based upon geographical membership and not worksite or union commonality.

== History ==
The very first such credit union in the United States was founded in 1970 in Isla Vista, California (Santa Barbara County) as a direct result of the burning of a branch of Bank of America. Initial organizers and members of the credit union Board of Directors included Wanda Michalenko, Matthew Steen, David Vaughn, Charlie Jones, David Bearman and others.

This modest founding model later grew into community organizing against redlining and the eventual passage of the Community Reinvestment Act in the State of California and other states that currently allow government reserves and other municipal funds to be transferred into CUNA-insured local credit unions as an alternative to full-service banking institutions. The first actual transfer of government funds in the United States occurred with the Isla Vista Community Federal Credit Union when the Associated Students of the University of California, Santa Barbara transferred part of its financial reserves from the Bank of America in 1977.

== See also ==
- Credit union service organization
- Credit union
- National Credit Union Administration
