= Isla Vista, California =

Community in California, United States

- Unincorporated community census-designated place
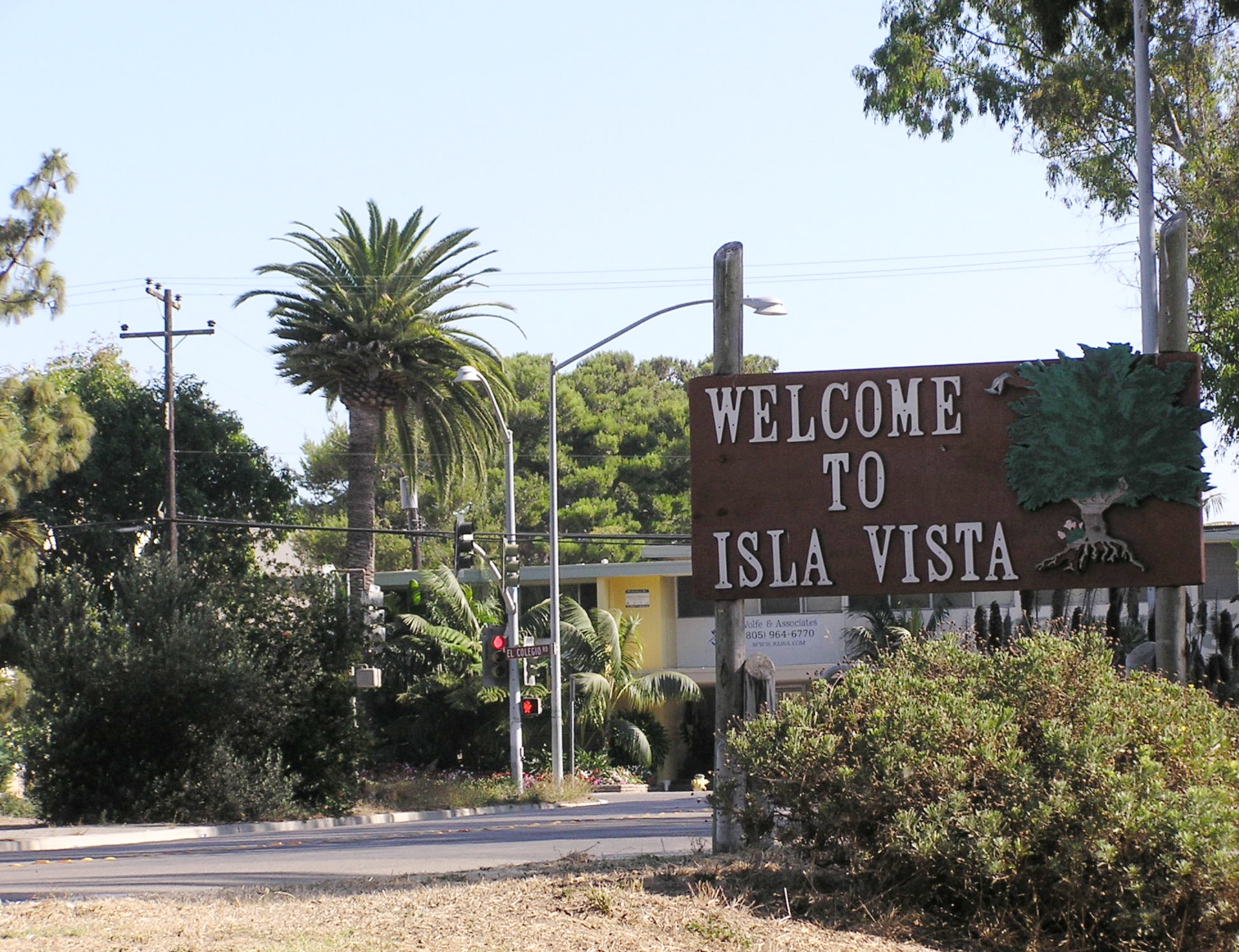
- A welcome sign in Isla Vista
- Nickname: I.V.
- Interactive map of Isla Vista, California
- Location in the United States Isla Vista, California (California) Isla Vista, California (the United States)
- Coordinates: 34°24′48″N 119°51′39″W
- Country: United States
- State: California
- County: Santa Barbara

Government
  - County Supervisor: Joan Hartmann
  - Senate: Monique Limón (D)
  - Assembly: Gregg Hart (D)
  - U.S. Congress: Salud Carbajal (D)

Area
  - Total: 0.595 sq mi (1.542 km^{2})
  - Land: 0.551 sq mi (1.428 km^{2})
  - Water: 0.044 sq mi (0.114 km^{2}) 7.38%
- Elevation: 46 ft (14 m)

Population (2020)
  - Total: 15,500
  - Density: 28,000/sq mi (10,900/km^{2})
- Time zone: UTC-8 (PST)
  - Summer (DST): UTC-7 (PDT)
- ZIP code: 93117
- Area code: 805
- FIPS code: 06-36868
- GNIS feature ID: 1702880
- Website: islavistacsd.ca.gov

Isla Vista (English: /ˈaɪlə ˈvɪstə/ EYE-luh VIS-tuh; Spanish: [ˈisla ˈβista], lit. 'island view') is an unincorporated community in Santa Barbara County, California, United States. As of 2020 census, the community had a population of 15,500. For statistical purposes, the United States Census Bureau has defined the community as a census-designated place (CDP). The majority of residents are college students at the University of California, Santa Barbara, or Santa Barbara City College. The beachside community of Isla Vista lies on a flat plateau about 30 feet (9 m) in elevation, separated from the beach by a bluff.

Isla Vista enjoys a Mediterranean climate and often has slightly less precipitation than Santa Barbara and Goleta. Isla Vista is located on a south-facing portion of the Santa Barbara County coast, between Coal Oil Point and Campus Point in view of the Channel Islands. During El Niño years, precipitation in Isla Vista can be excessive and potentially dangerous. Some homes and apartments built on the south side of Del Playa Drive, most popular with students due to their direct ocean views, are built on eroding bluffs thirty to sixty feet above the Pacific Ocean. Recent erosion has exposed foundation supports in several of the properties closest to the nearby UC Santa Barbara campus.

As Isla Vista is on the south coast of Santa Barbara County, which has some of the highest housing prices in the United States, the student population shares densely packed housing with a working class Hispanic population. While the main campus is to the east, the community is surrounded on three sides by university property governed by the state Board of Regents.

Isla Vista is home to a student housing cooperative, the Santa Barbara Student Housing Coop, as well as a food cooperative, the Isla Vista Food Co-op.

== History ==
=== Early days ===
The earliest human occupants of Isla Vista were the Chumash or their forebears. They called the Isla Vista mesa Anisq'oyo (related to the Chumash word for "manzanita") and had permanent settlements near Cheadle Hall and the 217 entrance on the UCSB Campus; these villages were collectively called Heliyik. Eventually the Franciscan Fathers forced the Chumash to move to the Santa Barbara Mission.

The Isla Vista mesa was part of the Mexican land grant Rancho Dos Pueblos made in 1842 to Nicolas A. Den. Den's son, Alfonso Den, inherited the land. He and some of his nine siblings were plaintiffs in a famous lawsuit; when they were minors their land had been illegally sold in 1869 by the administrator of their estate, Charles E. Huse, to Col. William Welles Hollister, namesake of Hollister Avenue in Goleta, the Hollister Ranch, and Hollister, California. San Francisco lawyer Thomas B. Bishop sued Hollister on behalf of the Den children in 1876, and won the case in 1885. Bishop took much of the prime land owned by the Den children as a legal fee, and to this day some of that land, in the city of Goleta near Glen Annie Road, is called the Bishop Ranch. The least attractive land was left to the Den children, and that included the Rincon Ranch, which was at that time the name of the entire Isla Vista mesa, from present-day UCSB west to Coal Oil Point. The Rincon (Spanish for angle or corner) is the corner where Storke Road turns into El Colegio; until 1930 or so, Storke to El Colegio was the only road into Isla Vista, because other roads such as Los Carneros or Ward Memorial did not exist, because the Goleta Slough prevented passage. The Rincon Ranch had very little fresh water, was marginal for agriculture, and was split between three of the Den children: Augusto Den, who had mental disabilities, got the land that now forms the UCSB Main Campus and Alfonso got the land that is now Isla Vista.

A portion of Alfonso Den's land was purchased by John and Pauline Ilharreguy, residents of Fillmore in 1915. The Ilharreguys arranged in 1925 the subdivision of the central tract they named Isla Vista (ungrammatical Spanish), and also laid out and named the four streets closest to the bluff: Del Playa (ungrammatical Spanish), Sabado Tarde, Trigo, and Pasado. The tract between Isla Vista and today's UCSB campus, owned by two Santa Barbara attorneys and partners Alfred W. Robertson (namesake of UCSB's Robertson Gymnasium) and James R. Thompson, was subdivided and named Ocean Terrace in 1926. The third tract that comprises today's Isla Vista, Orilla Del Mar, to the west of the Isla Vista tract, was owned by two Santa Barbara sisters, Harriett (who designed a number of "fairy tale" homes on the South Coast of Santa Barbara County) and Brenda Moody, and was subdivided in 1926.

The Isla Vista subdivisions are the earliest urban subdivisions performed in the Goleta Valley in the 20th century. The narrow streets of Isla Vista are characteristic of 1920s land planning. Plans for water, electricity, road building, and sewage were not made in the 1920s; the subdivision was speculative. Some of the speculation was related to ocean-front real estate, but an equally important motive was the likelihood of oil reserves' being accessible from Isla Vista property. To aid speculation, the lots in the subdivision were narrow, and mineral rights were pooled among blocks of lots. Some oil was found, but the wells did not sustain oil production, unlike the very productive Ellwood Oil Field just to the west of Isla Vista. An oil deposit about one mile (1.6 km) south of Isla Vista under the Santa Barbara Channel, known as the South Ellwood field, was eventually found, but has never been fully developed, due to local political opposition after the 1969 Santa Barbara oil spill. The South Ellwood field contains upward of 100 million barrels (16,000,000 m^{3}) of oil, and attempts by ARCO (in the 1980s) and by Mobil (in the 1990s) to develop the field have been rebuffed by local opposition.

Even though the Isla Vista lots were sold to several hundred owners in the 1920s, only a few vacation cottages were built before the 1940s. Scarcity of water, which had to be trucked in, as well as primitive sewage and refuse collection kept the development modest. A few dirt farmers raised beans, and piled their refuse into large heaps. One prominent early resident was architect E. Keith Lockard, designer of a number of buildings in Santa Barbara County.

=== World War II ===
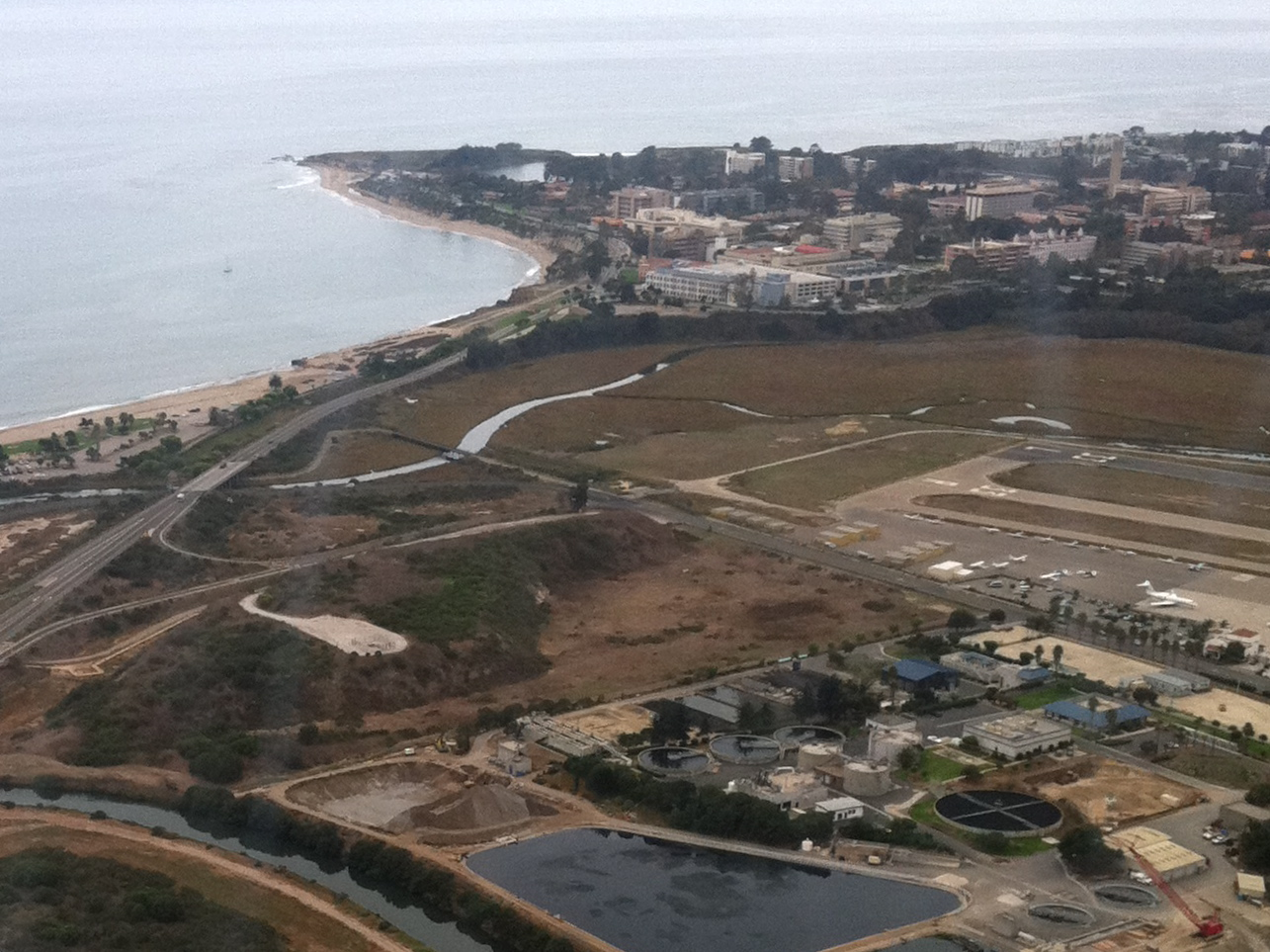
Aerial view of the remaining part of Mescalitan Island (left) and the Goleta Sanitary Sewage Treatment Plant, with UCSB in the distance

On February 23, 1942, a Japanese submarine attacked the Ellwood oil field to the west of Isla Vista. The United States Marine Corps took over the land immediately to the east of Isla Vista (now the UCSB campus) and the land that now forms the Santa Barbara Airport. The Marine Corps developed Marine Corps Air Station Santa Barbara as an important flight training facility for squadrons fighting the Japanese in the Western Pacific, most notably the famed Blacksheep of VMF-214 trained here until their ill-fated deployment aboard the USS Franklin (CV-13). In the process of this crucial war-time development of the air base, Mescalitan Island, home of a tribal king and site of extensive sacred Chumash cemeteries, was bulldozed to fill most remaining portions of the Goleta Slough, once an extensive estuary that sustained a few thousand Chumash. The slough was at one time deep enough that Spanish explorers were able to sail near to the foothills, past the location of present-day Hollister Avenue. By this time, however, most of the slough had been silted in by the enormous deluge of 1861–62, as well as by dirt loosened from agricultural operations in the area. The Marine Corps filled in the remaining deep channels, particularly one that is now under the primary runway used for civil aviation today. The Marine Corps then built a sewage processing facility which is the site of the Goleta Sanitary District facility.

The Marine Corps Air facility was deemed superfluous after World War II, and the airport was transferred to the City of Santa Barbara, while the blufftop barracks and land were transferred to the University of California in 1948.

Water became available from a reservoir in the Santa Ynez Mountains, Lake Cachuma, in the early 1950s. The Isla Vista Sanitary District (now called the Goleta West Sanitary District) was established in 1954.

=== University ===
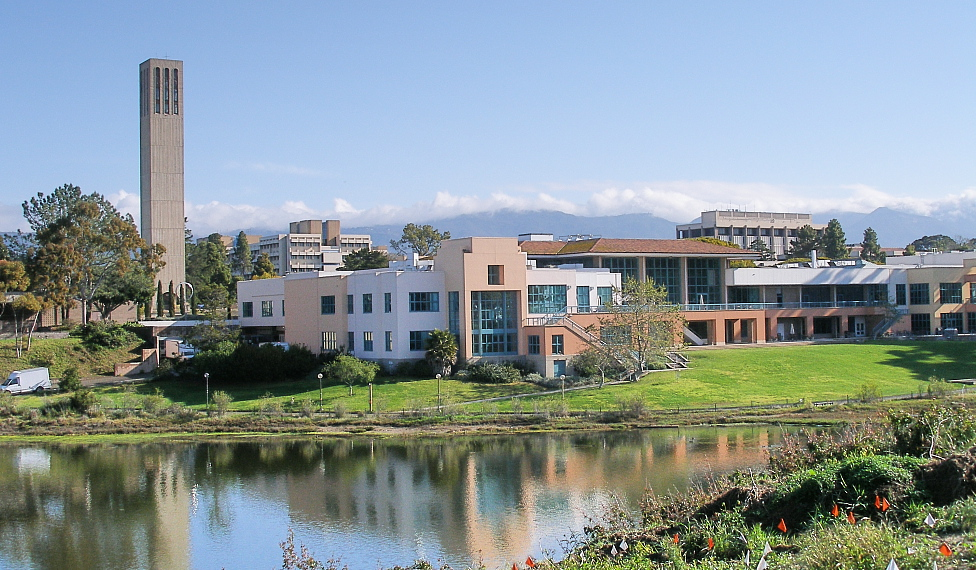
UC Santa Barbara campus

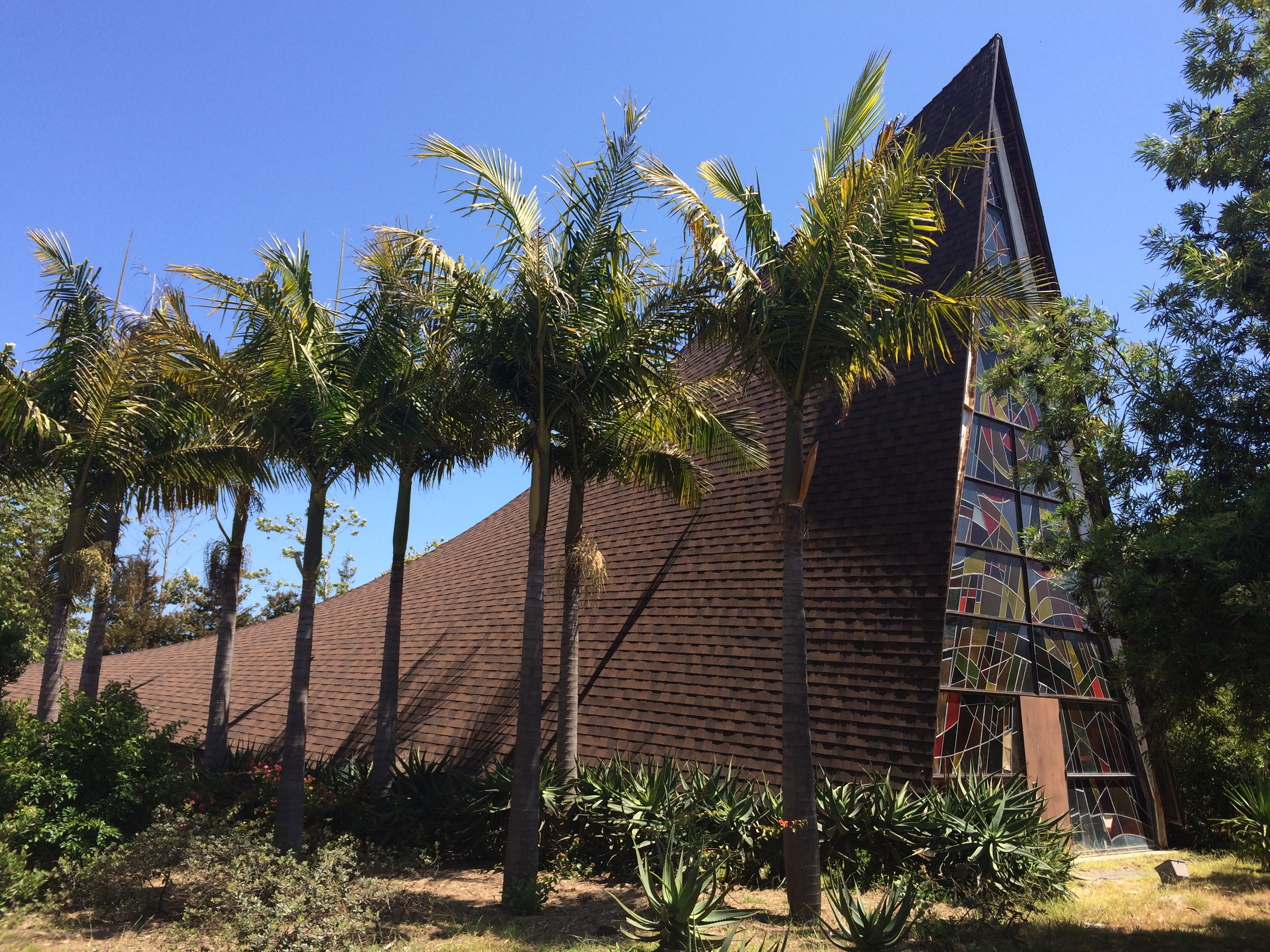
St. Michael's Church, established in 1954, chapel built in 1963

The University of California, Santa Barbara, moved to its new campus in 1954, and a gala inauguration was held.

Clark G. Kuebler, was brought in to lead the new campus. Kuebler had been the president of Ripon College, a small liberal arts college in Wisconsin. Kuebler was also a prominent leader in the Episcopal Church and helped establish Isla Vista's first church, St. Michael and All Angels at Camino Pescadero and Picasso. Kuebler resigned in 1955, after accusations that he had solicited another man in New York City.

In the 1950s, UCSB professor Douwe Stuurman hosted the famed writer Aldous Huxley at his home on Del Playa. Huxley delivered a series of lectures at UCSB and in the Santa Barbara area.

By the late 1950s, with the end of World War II, the Baby Boom, and the G.I. Bill, it became clear that thousands of students would flood the University of California.

The development of Isla Vista as a housing site for UCSB students attending a much larger institution began with regulated dormitories located along El Colegio Road. UCSB administrators recruited developers to build large complexes on El Colegio, which in 1960 were considered to be forward-looking and modern, winning several design awards. Some of these dorms were portrayed in the mystery novels of Ross Macdonald.

=== 1960s and 1970s ===
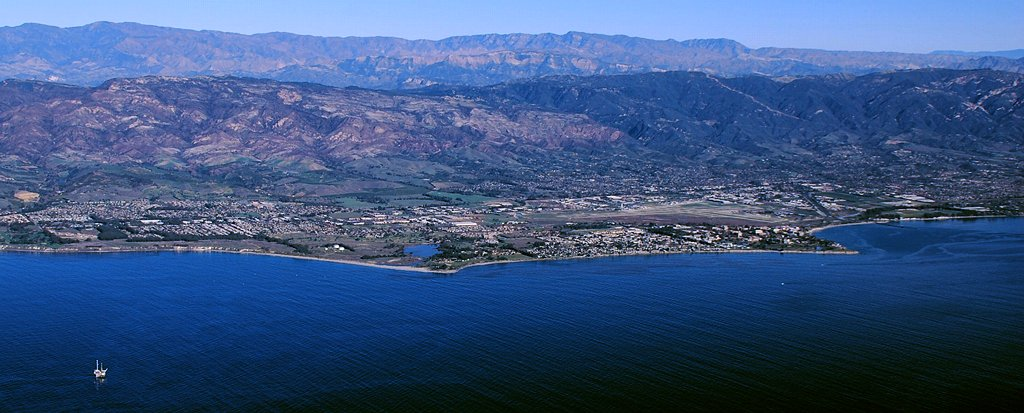
An aerial shot spanning Ellwood, Isla Vista, and Santa Barbara

By the early 1960s, older students became frustrated with the curfews and entry restrictions in the dormitories and drove demand for unregulated apartments in Isla Vista. Very aggressive developers built apartments to meet the demand and successfully lobbied County Supervisors to drive down the requirements for parking places associated with the apartments, and to further drive up the density of dwelling units. At the same time, efforts to unify the owners of commercially zoned property around the Embarcadero Loop failed, leaving issues of coordinated business development and parking for commercial customers unresolved.

By 1967, Isla Vista had hundreds of cheaply constructed multiple dwelling units, and a commercial center that included physician and dental offices, jewelers, insurance and financial offices, as well as eclectic bookstores and an art-house movie theater. Trees and landscaping had not grown to appreciable heights, giving the town a barren look, and trash collected in empty lots. About that time, the youth culture or counterculture ramped up, and Isla Vista became a natural waystation for youth who were hitchhiking up and down the coast of California.

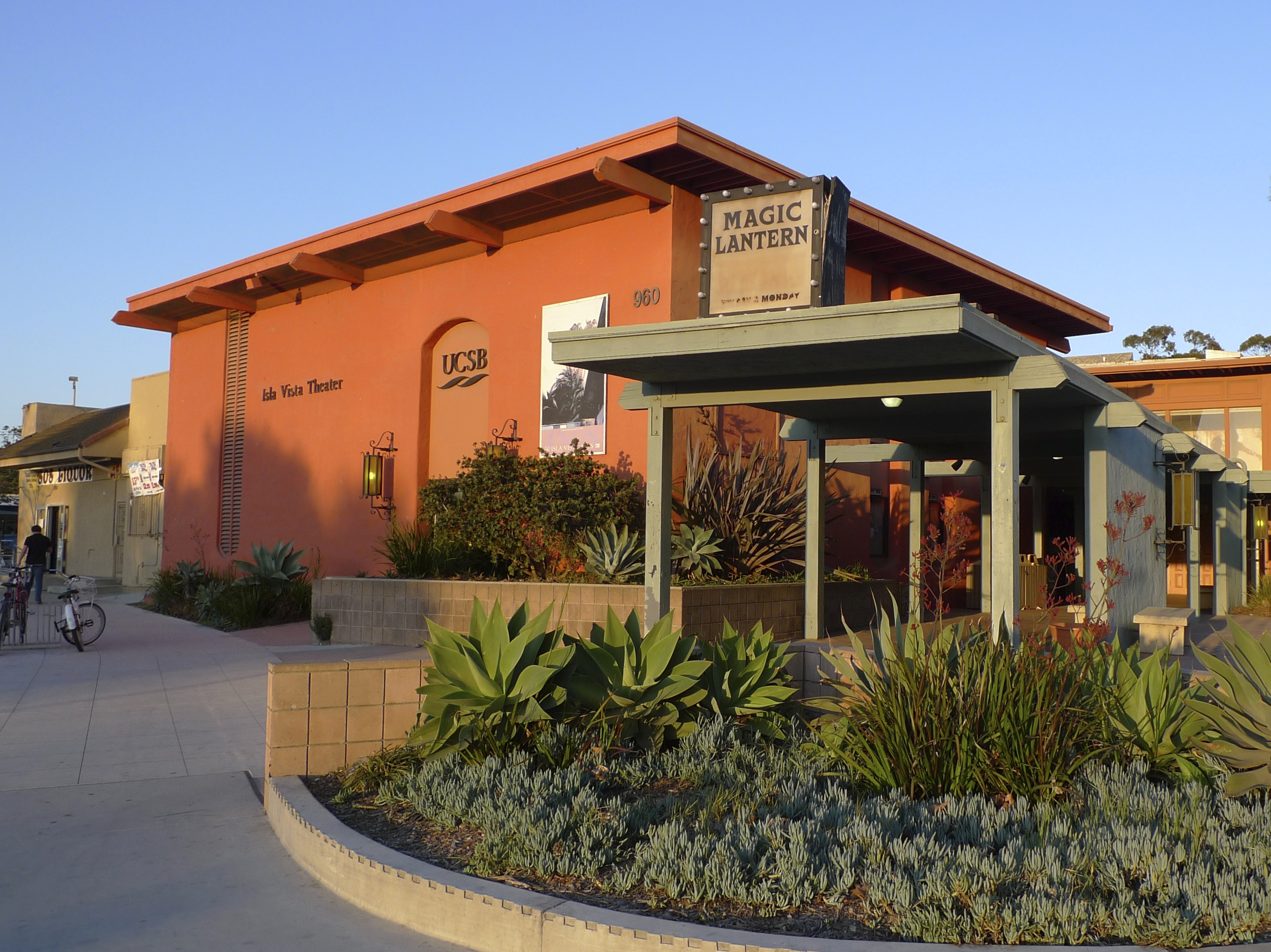
UCSB lecture halls that were formerly the Magic Lantern movie theater, established in 1965. UCSB sponsors a film screening series called Magic Lantern, part of Isla Vista Arts.

Richard Brautigan did his first reading of Trout Fishing in America in Isla Vista in October 1967, at the Unicorn Book Shop. The surrounding Santa Barbara community was uncomfortable with the flotsam and jetsam of the counterculture who were pausing in Isla Vista, and the District Attorney raided the art-house movie theater, the Magic Lantern, while it showed a movie containing full frontal nudity. The operators were charged with obscenity, lost financing, and then lost their business. County Sheriffs Deputies were uncomfortable with the open marijuana use and drug dealing on the streets, and tensions grew. It is local folklore that Jim Morrison of The Doors wrote the song "The Crystal Ship" one night while on an acid trip on Sands Beach, watching the bright lights on the oil platform Holly a few miles off the southwest tip of Isla Vista.

A student group known as the "IV League" organized itself to take civic responsibility for Isla Vista and coordinated street parties, meetings with the deputies, cleanups, and planting of street trees. The IV League was viewed as too moderate and lost influence.

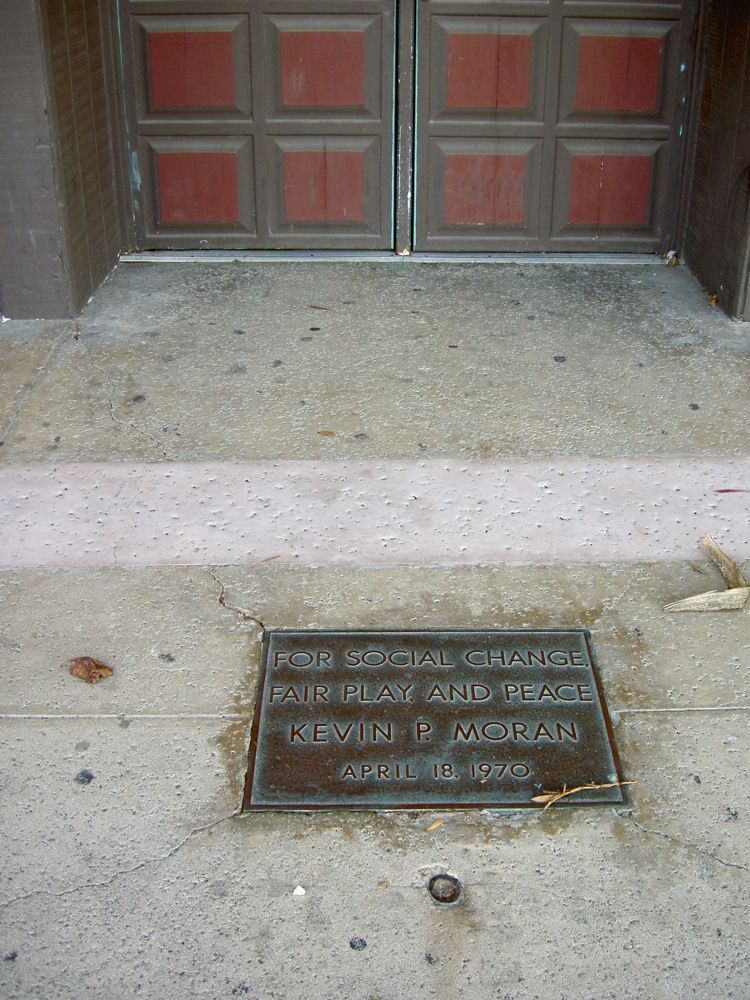
Memorial plaque for Kevin Moran at Embarcadero Hall, the former location of the Bank of America

The Bank of America building was burned by rioting students on February 25, 1970. Tensions escalated after students were walking back after listening to a speaker opposed to the Vietnam War, when the police beat and arrested a student. According to Cril Payne, author of Deep Cover, a history of his career in the FBI, the FBI was very active in Santa Barbara, and the charge of "students" that resulted in the burning of the Bank of America was a COINTELPRO FBI operation. Kevin Moran, a student who put out a fire in the temporary Bank of America during a riot in April 1970, was killed by police fire, and during a June 1970 riot, Los Angeles County sheriff's deputies ran amok, prompting criticism from William F. Buckley, Jr., the conservative commentator.

At some time on the night of July 4–5, 1970, three men in sleeping bags on the beach near the UCSB Campus Point were attacked by three men with axes or a machete and knives. Two of the victims died at the scene and the third victim, Thomas M. Hayes, somehow survived the attack and told authorities at least one of his attackers was Asian. No money or jewelry was taken from the victims, so robbery was not a motive. Five other murders on nearby beaches happened between February 1970 and June 1972, three of which occurred in Santa Barbara, and two of which occurred in Isla Vista.

In the early 1970s, state officials created municipal advisory councils to deal with civil unrest in urban settings, by giving unincorporated communities quasi-representation in policy decisions to provide standard municipal services. Santa Barbara was among the first counties in the state the use them.

The Isla Vista Municipal Advisory Council held its first election in early 1971 with nine local residents of the student community elected to the government with funding from the county for operations. The advisory council tried to incorporate Isla Vista in 1973, 1975 and again in 1985, but none of the efforts succeeded. The council was eventually dissolved.

Also in the 1970s, the now-defunct Isla Vista Community Council, funded by the university, was created. The Council ran its own elections and provided a central focus for the community.

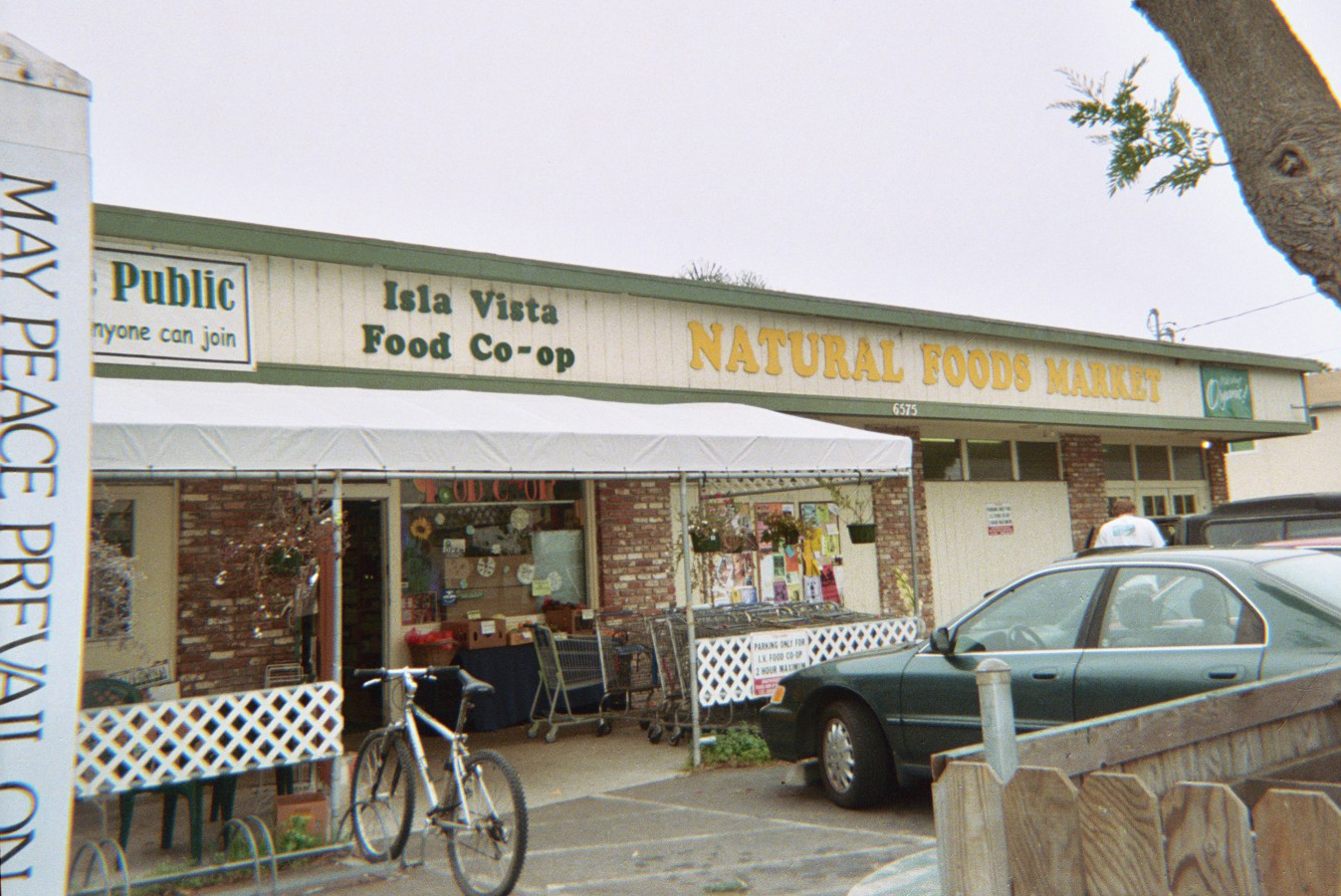
The Isla Vista Food Co-op, with a Peace pole visible in the foreground

Additionally, many alternative organizations were created, including the second free clinic in the State after the original Haight Ashbury Free Clinic. The Isla Vista Recreation and Park District was founded in 1972, the second special district in Isla Vista (the first was the Isla Vista Sanitary District, now known as the Goleta West Sanitary District). It was also in the 1970s that the Isla Vista Food Cooperative was created, and a community federal credit union based on geography for membership was founded. The Community Council implemented a variety of other services, including animal control, but these projects languished due to lack of monetary support from County government.

Several businesses were created. Paul Orfalea founded Kinko's in Isla Vista in 1970. Many traditional businesses, including dentists, jewelers, and hairdressers fled Isla Vista. Isla Vista became sundered from the surrounding communities, and in the long run, most of the eclectic Isla Vista businesses have disappeared.

Efforts to incorporate Isla Vista as a city failed in 1973, 1975, and 1985, in each case due to the Local Agency Formation Commission (LAFCO) voting down incorporation.

Starting in the 1970s, Isla Vista became more and more dominated by students from UCSB and nearby Santa Barbara City College. As UCSB grew and expanded its enrollment, the economic power of the students drove non-student residents out.

In late 1976 to early 1977 (and later 1979), four young women from Isla Vista were kidnapped and killed. These murders motivated large demonstrations opposed to violence against women and in favor of better transportation for the young people residing in Isla Vista.

=== 1980s and later ===
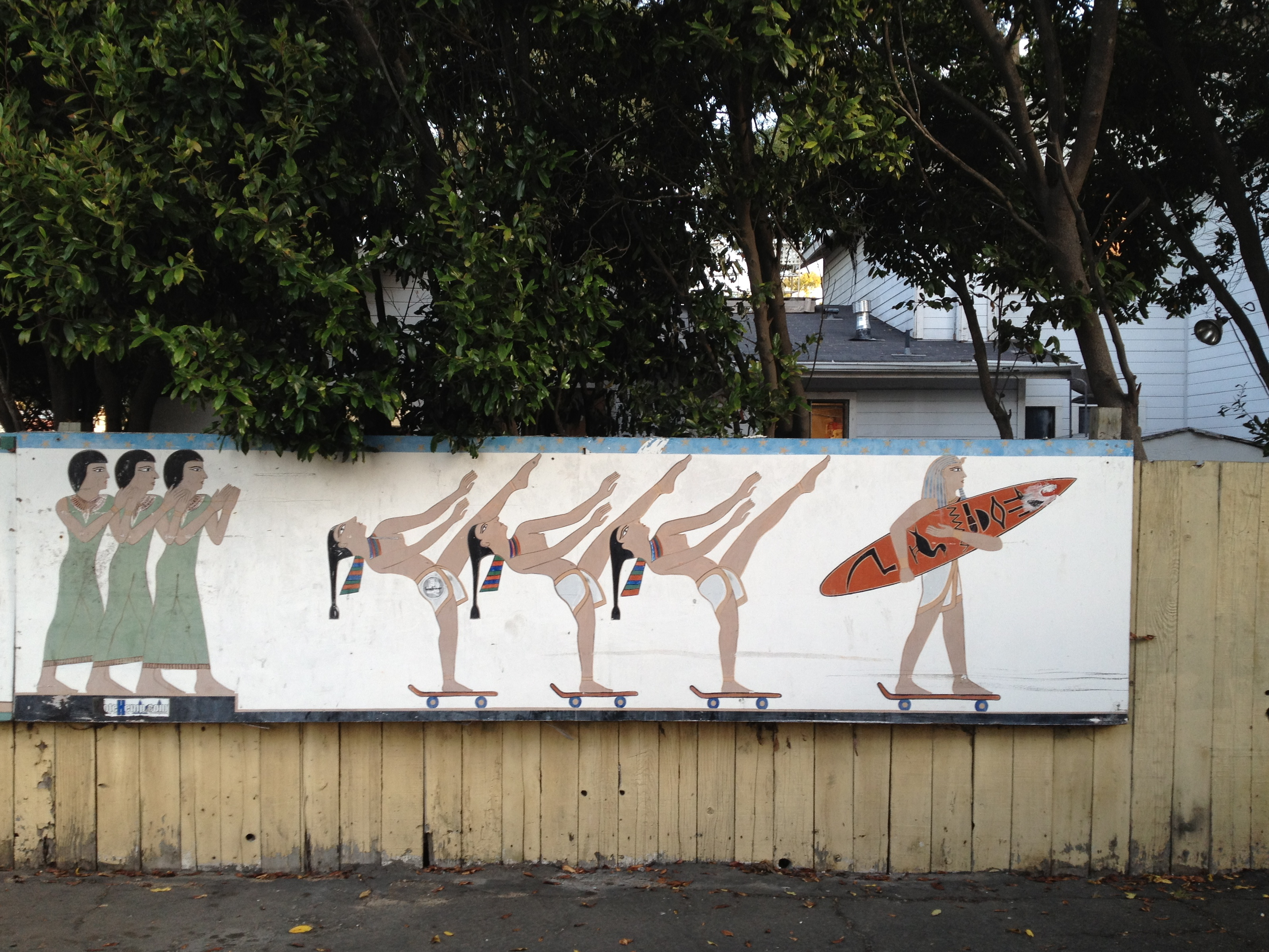
Mural that was in the parking lot of the band studio and storage unit buildings on Seville Road

Isla Vista has been an incubator for youth culture and has always had a number of local bands. Beginning around 1980, many of these bands used storage garages in the 6500 block of Seville Road owned by Sid Goren, as rehearsal spaces. In the late 1980s, alt-rockers Toad the Wet Sprocket rehearsed there, and although their origin is Goleta, they often performed in Isla Vista. Other performers from the area that have garnered substantial notability include Animal Liberation Orchestra, Jack Johnson, Steve Aoki, Lagwagon, Thriving Ivory, Rebelution, Ugly Kid Joe, Iration and Nezara. The Seville Road practice spaces were demolished in 2012 to make way for one of many luxury student housing complexes.

When the City of Goleta was incorporated in 2001, the residents of Goleta successfully persuaded LAFCO to exclude Isla Vista from the new city's boundaries. Many observers noted that Isla Vistans shop mostly in Goleta, because county planners channeled commercial business development into Goleta. A vocal and organized group of Isla Vista residents argued for inclusion of Isla Vista in the new City of Goleta but encountered strong opposition from the chair and executive director of LAFCO. LAFCO enabled the City of Goleta to garner the tax revenue from Isla Vista's economic activity, without civic responsibility for Isla Vista's infrastructure. Some note also that Santa Barbara County gets net revenue from Isla Vista and so has a financial interest in maintaining Isla Vista's unincorporated status. The official reason for the exclusion of Isla Vista given by the executive director of LAFCO was "political infeasibility." The only wide poll of the greater Goleta area, conducted by the Goleta Roundtable, indicated that a city including Isla Vista would pass at the ballot box, however.

The 2001 Isla Vista killings occurred when UCSB freshman David Attias killed four students and a fifth was critically injured on the night of February 23, 2001, by slamming his car into several parked cars and pedestrians on the 6500 block of Sabado Tarde Road. Although initially charged with four counts of murder, four counts of vehicular manslaughter with gross negligence, and five counts of felony driving under the influence, Attias was later found to be legally insane.

On April 5, 2014, during an annual celebration known as Deltopia (formerly known as Floatopia), a riot broke out in Isla Vista after a police officer tried to arrest a partygoer, only to be hit in the head with a bag of bottles from behind. The subsequent police response to the assault drew a large crowd to protest, some of whom eventually began throwing objects at the police. By the end of the night, nearly 100 people were arrested. Subsequently, IV Foot Patrol deputies were some of the first officers in the county to use body cameras.

On May 23, 2014, the 2014 Isla Vista killings occurred where seven people, including the attacker, were killed and fourteen others were injured. The attacks took place at seventeen separate crime scenes, including a sorority house, a deli, and the attacker's own apartment. Twenty-two-year-old former Santa Barbara City College student Elliot Rodger stabbed three men to death in his apartment, then fired at UCSB students and other pedestrians in which ten were shot, three fatally, hitting several, and also struck seven others, all of them non-fatally, with his BMW. Rodger had left a YouTube video recorded on the day of his killing spree in which he blamed young women who he claimed rejected his advances. Rodger died of a gunshot wound to the head, apparently a suicide, as Santa Barbara County Sheriff's deputies closed in on his crashed vehicle.

== Geography ==
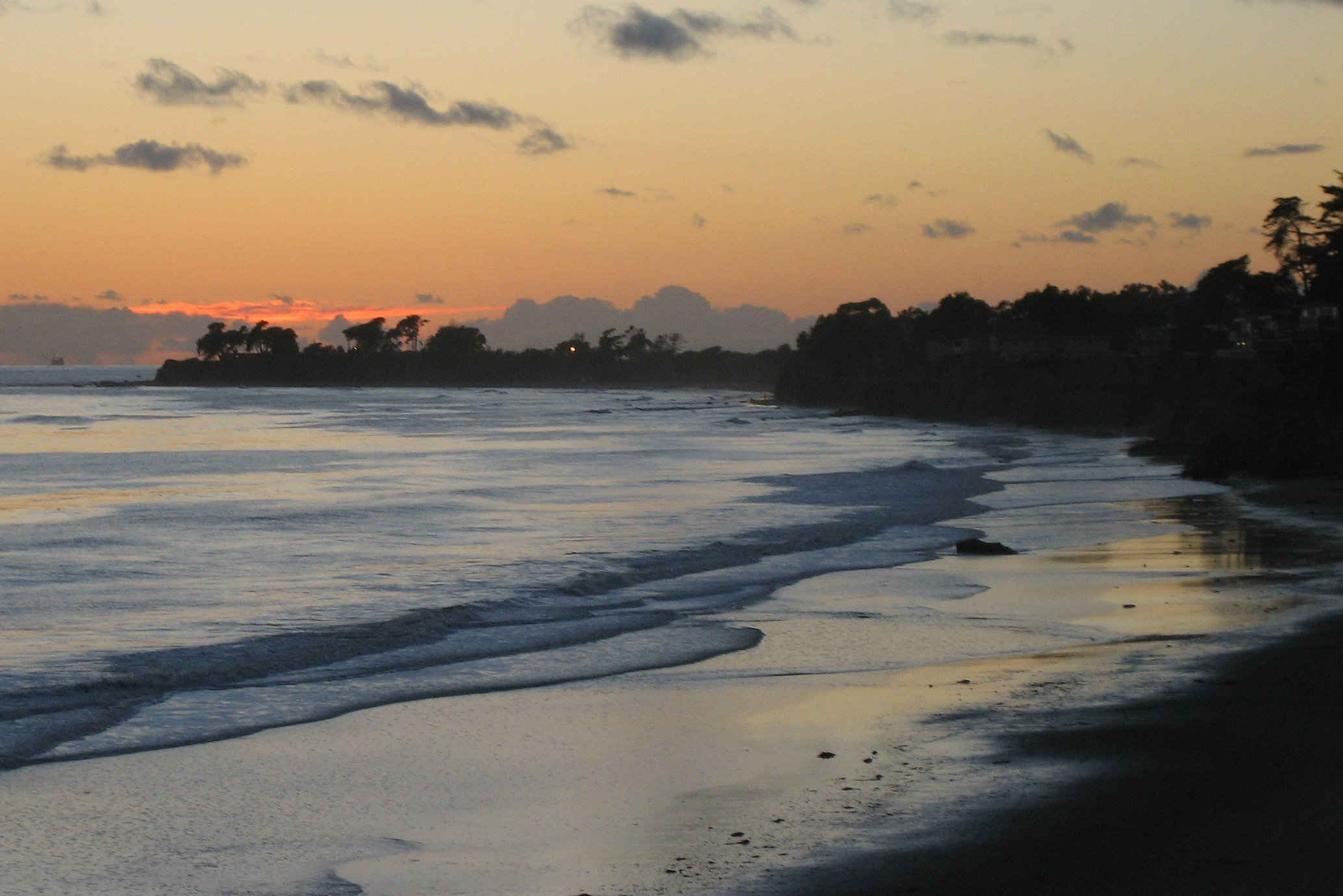
Isla Vista beachfront at sunset

Traditionally, Isla Vista is the area boxed in by El Colegio Road to the north, Ocean Road to the east, the beach to the south, and Camino Majorca to the west. The 2000 census showed 13,465 residents in this area of about 0.55 square miles (1.4 km^{2}). The 2010 census showed population growth in this area of 10.2%, to 14,843. The densest (by population per land area) of the three subdivisions in the box, also called Isla Vista, was in 2010 the 87th densest census tract in California.

The Isla Vista census-designated place defined in 2000 adds considerable land "outside the box", including the UCSB campus, Storke Ranch, and the area between Los Carneros and Storke Road north to Hollister Avenue, and contained a population of 18,344 and a land area of 2.2 square miles (5.7 km^{2}). In the 2000 census, a mistake was made, and about 2,000 UCSB dormitory residents were listed as residing at the Santa Barbara Airport, and thus were outside the CDP. Starting in 2010, the Isla Vista CDP boundaries were revised to exclude various areas, including Storke Ranch and the Storke Plaza shopping center, which are now in the City of Goleta, reducing the CDP land area to 1.9 square miles (4.9 km^{2}).

"Isla Vista" is actually the name of the first subdivision built in the center of the community which gave it its name. The Isla Vista subdivision proper is between Camino Pescadero on the east and Camino Corto on the west. The Isla Vista subdivision was established in 1925, the Ocean Terrace subdivision between University of California, Santa Barbara (UCSB) and Camino Pescadero, and the Orilla del Mar subdivision between Camino Corto and the UCSB West Campus, both built in 1926. A number of east–west streets undergo "jogs" at the boundaries of the three subdivisions, because Santa Barbara County never required the three subdivisions to use a common street layout. The three subdivisions now are collectively called Isla Vista, and their total extent occupies land inherited by Alfonso Den, son of Nicolas A. Den, grantee of the Mexican land grant Rancho Dos Pueblos.

In the 2001 incorporation of Goleta, inland to the north and up the coast to the west, Isla Vista was excluded. Whether or not to include Isla Vista was a subject of debate during incorporation planning, where a Goleta resident expressed concern about polls that indicated opposition to Isla Vista by all Goletans. Eventually, the LAFCO recommended the exclusion of Isla Vista from the City of Goleta, although LAFCO projections indicated that the City of Goleta gave up $33 million in revenue over 10 years by excluding Isla Vista. The reason that LAFCO cited for recommending the exclusion of Isla Vista was "community identity".

Isla Vista is located at 34°24'53" North, 119°51'38" West (34.414595, −119.860418).

According to the United States Census Bureau, the CDP has a total area of 0.595 square miles (1.54 km^{2}), of which 92.62% of it is land and 7.38% of it is water.

=== Major streets ===
==== Del Playa Drive ====
Looking eastward from the end of the 6700 block of Del Playa Drive

Del Playa Drive (also known as D.P.) stretches four blocks over the full length of Isla Vista (about one mile). It begins at the bike path bordering the campus and continues to Camino Majorca, where it ends at the entrance to the trails to Sands Beach. Del Playa Drive is a large component of the University of California Santa Barbara off-campus social life.

Del Playa Drive has also been a source of housing controversy, as some of the apartment buildings are falling off of the rapidly eroding cliffs. Recently, however, steps have been taken to slow the erosion by reinforcing the cliffs with imported rock, concrete and other artificial support structures, and by redirecting water runoff through the cliffs, rather than over them as it would flow naturally.

=== Beaches ===
==== Devereux ====
A favourite among surfers, Devereux Beach is on the east side of Coal Oil Point in Isla Vista, California. Behind the beach is the west campus of the University of California Santa Barbara.

=== Climate ===
Climate data for Isla Vista, California
Month	Jan	Feb	Mar	Apr	May	Jun	Jul	Aug	Sep	Oct	Nov	Dec	Year
Record high °F (°C)	86 (30)	87 (31)	90 (32)	99 (37)	100 (38)	103 (39)	108 (42)	100 (38)	105 (41)	99 (37)	96 (36)	89 (32)	108 (42)
Mean daily maximum °F (°C)	62.7 (17.1)	63.8 (17.7)	64.4 (18.0)	67.0 (19.4)	68.9 (20.5)	70.3 (21.3)	73.0 (22.8)	73.5 (23.1)	73.3 (22.9)	71.6 (22.0)	67.7 (19.8)	63.1 (17.3)	68.3 (20.2)
Mean daily minimum °F (°C)	42.8 (6.0)	44.7 (7.1)	47.0 (8.3)	48.9 (9.4)	52.1 (11.2)	54.9 (12.7)	57.7 (14.3)	57.9 (14.4)	56.7 (13.7)	52.6 (11.4)	46.7 (8.2)	42.7 (5.9)	50.4 (10.2)
Record low °F (°C)	26 (−3)	31 (−1)	31 (−1)	33 (1)	39 (4)	41 (5)	45 (7)	43 (6)	42 (6)	37 (3)	30 (−1)	28 (−2)	26 (−3)
Average precipitation inches (mm)	3.70 (94)	4.33 (110)	3.56 (90)	0.79 (20)	0.30 (7.6)	0.05 (1.3)	0.03 (0.76)	0.10 (2.5)	0.41 (10)	0.56 (14)	1.39 (35)	2.36 (60)	17.57 (446)

== Demographics ==
Historical population
Census	Pop.	Note	%±
1970	13,441		—
1990	20,395		—
2000	18,344		−10.1%
2010	23,096		25.9%
2020	15,500		−32.9%
U.S. Decennial Census; 1860–1870 1880-1890; 1900 1910 1920; 1930 1940 1950; 1960 1970 1980; 1990 2000 2010; 2020

Isla Vista first appeared as a census designated place in the 1990 U.S. census.

=== Racial and ethnic composition ===
Isla Vista CDP, California – Racial and ethnic composition Note: the US Census treats Hispanic/Latino as an ethnic category. This table excludes Latinos from the racial categories and assigns them to a separate category. Hispanics/Latinos may be of any race.
Race / Ethnicity (NH = Non-Hispanic)	Pop 2000	Pop 2010	Pop 2020	% 2000	% 2010	% 2020
White alone (NH)	11,326	12,854	6,513	61.74%	55.65%	42.02%
Black or African American alone (NH)	341	521	316	1.86%	2.26%	2.04%
Native American or Alaska Native alone (NH)	58	42	15	0.32%	0.18%	0.10%
Asian alone (NH)	2,087	3,316	3,210	11.38%	14.36%	20.71%
Native Hawaiian or Pacific Islander alone (NH)	35	38	14	0.19%	0.16%	0.09%
Other race alone (NH)	52	70	134	0.28%	0.30%	0.86%
Mixed race or Multiracial (NH)	774	990	1,059	4.22%	4.29%	6.83%
Hispanic or Latino (any race)	3,671	5,265	4,239	20.01%	22.80%	27.35%
Total	18,344	23,096	15,500	100.00%	100.00%	100.00%

=== 2020 census ===
As of the 2020 census, Isla Vista had a population of 15,500. The population density was 28,130.7 inhabitants per square mile (10,861.3/km^{2}). The racial makeup of Isla Vista was 48.2% White, 2.2% African American, 0.6% Native American, 20.9% Asian, 0.1% Pacific Islander, 12.7% from other races, and 15.2% from two or more races. Hispanic or Latino of any race were 27.3% of the population.

The median age was 21.4 years. The age distribution was 8.5% under the age of 18, 74.6% aged 18 to 24, 10.2% aged 25 to 44, 3.9% aged 45 to 64, and 2.8% who were 65 years of age or older. For every 100 females, there were 88.7 males, and for every 100 females age 18 and over there were 86.7 males age 18 and over.

100.0% of residents lived in urban areas, while 0.0% lived in rural areas. The census reported that 88.9% of the population lived in households, 11.1% lived in non-institutionalized group quarters, and no one was institutionalized.

There were 4,465 households, out of which 12.1% included children under the age of 18, 6.5% were married-couple households, 6.2% were cohabiting couple households, 44.7% had a female householder with no spouse or partner present, and 42.6% had a male householder with no spouse or partner present. 29.2% of households were one person, and 6.4% were one person aged 65 or older. The average household size was 3.09. There were 869 families (19.5% of all households).

There were 4,665 housing units at an average density of 8,466.4 units per square mile (3,268.9 units/km^{2}), of which 4,465 (95.7%) were occupied. Of these, 1.9% were owner-occupied, and 98.1% were occupied by renters. Of all housing units, 4.3% were vacant; the homeowner vacancy rate was 0.0% and the rental vacancy rate was 2.8%.

=== Demographic estimates ===
In 2023, the US Census Bureau estimated that 11.7% of the population were foreign-born. Of all people aged 5 or older, 73.1% spoke only English at home, 13.0% spoke Spanish, 4.5% spoke other Indo-European languages, 8.4% spoke Asian or Pacific Islander languages, and 0.9% spoke other languages. Of those aged 25 or older, 90.6% were high school graduates and 40.8% had a bachelor's degree.

=== Income and poverty ===
The median household income in 2023 was $24,428, and the per capita income was $13,289. About 6.7% of families and 69.3% of the population were below the poverty line.

The high percentage of non-family residents living below the poverty line can be attributed to the fact that Isla Vista is a town populated predominantly by college students.

=== 2010 census ===
The 2010 United States census reported that the Isla Vista CDP had a population of 23,096. The population density of the CDP was 12,376.4 people per square mile (4,778.6 people/km^{2}), making the Isla Vista CDP the community with the 26th-highest population density in California. The racial makeup of Isla Vista was 14,875 (64.4%) White, 594 (2.6%) African American, 104 (0.5%) Native American, 3,387 (14.7%) Asian, 45 (0.2%) Pacific Islander, 2,686 (11.6%) from other races, and 1,405 (6.1%) from two or more races. Hispanic or Latino of any race were 5,265 persons (22.8%).

The Census reported that 15,067 people (65.2% of the population) lived in households, 7,999 (34.6%) lived in non-institutionalized group quarters, and 30 (0.1%) were institutionalized.

There were 4,898 households, out of which 374 (7.6%) had children under the age of 18 living in them, 497 (10.1%) were opposite-sex married couples living together, 166 (3.4%) had a female householder with no husband present, 99 (2.0%) had a male householder with no wife present. There were 227 (4.6%) unmarried opposite-sex partnerships, and 32 (0.7%) same-sex married couples or partnerships. 961 households (19.6%) were made up of individuals, and 195 (4.0%) had someone living alone who was 65 years of age or older. The average household size was 3.08. There were 762 families (15.6% of all households); the average family size was 2.94.

The population was spread out, with 700 people (3.0%) under the age of 18, 19,574 people (84.8%) aged 18 to 24, 2,076 people (9.0%) aged 25 to 44, 449 people (1.9%) aged 45 to 64, and 297 people (1.3%) who were 65 years of age or older. The median age was 20.7 years. For every 100 females, there were 97.1 males. For every 100 females age 18 and over, there were 96.8 males.

There were 5,091 housing units at an average density of 2,728.1 units per square mile (1,053.3 units/km^{2}), of which 129 (2.6%) were owner-occupied, and 4,769 (97.4%) were occupied by renters. The homeowner vacancy rate was 1.5%; the rental vacancy rate was 1.9%. 344 people (1.5% of the population) lived in owner-occupied housing units and 14,723 people (63.7%) lived in rental housing units.

== Arts and culture ==
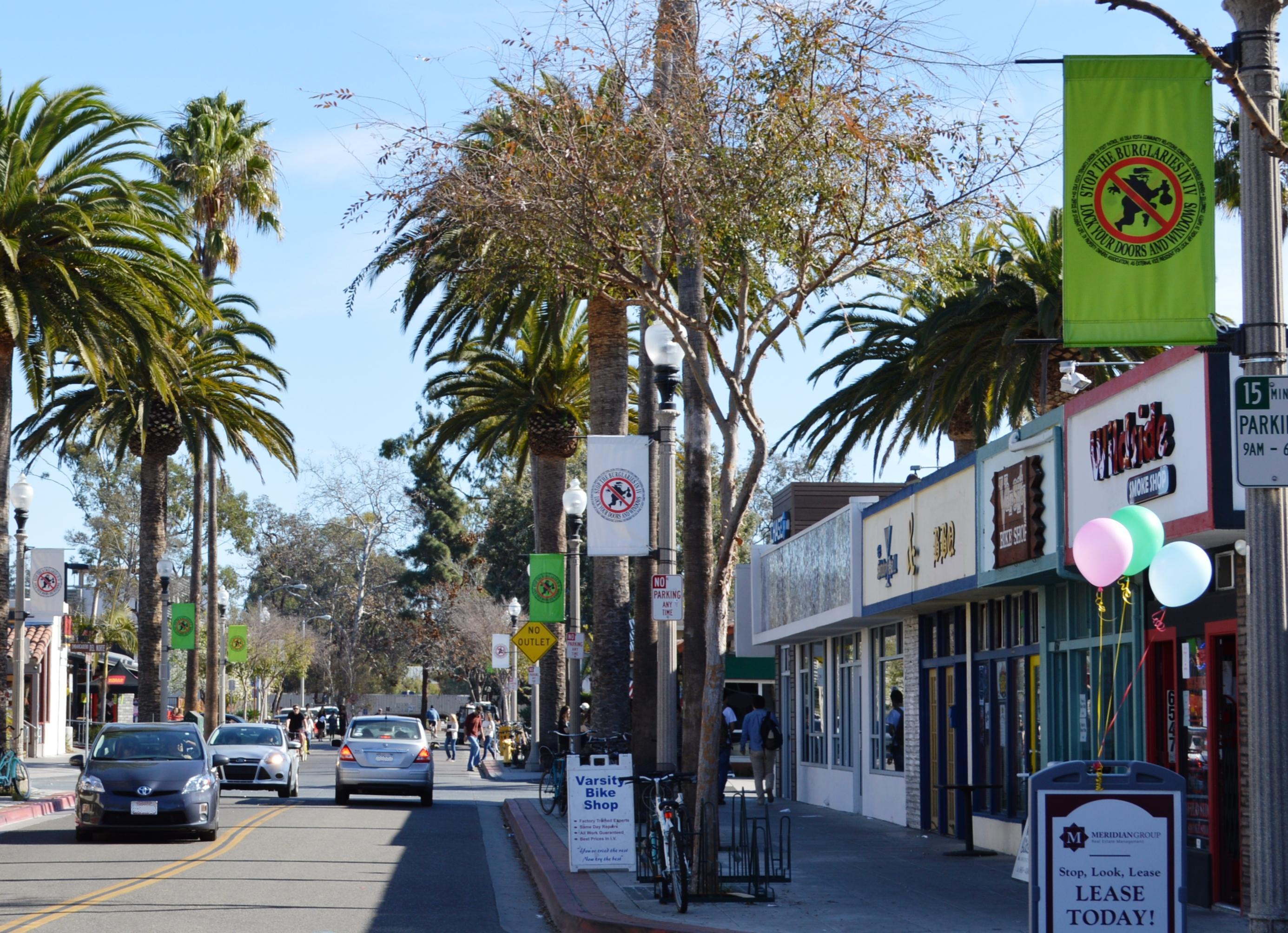
Pardall Road, the main commercial street

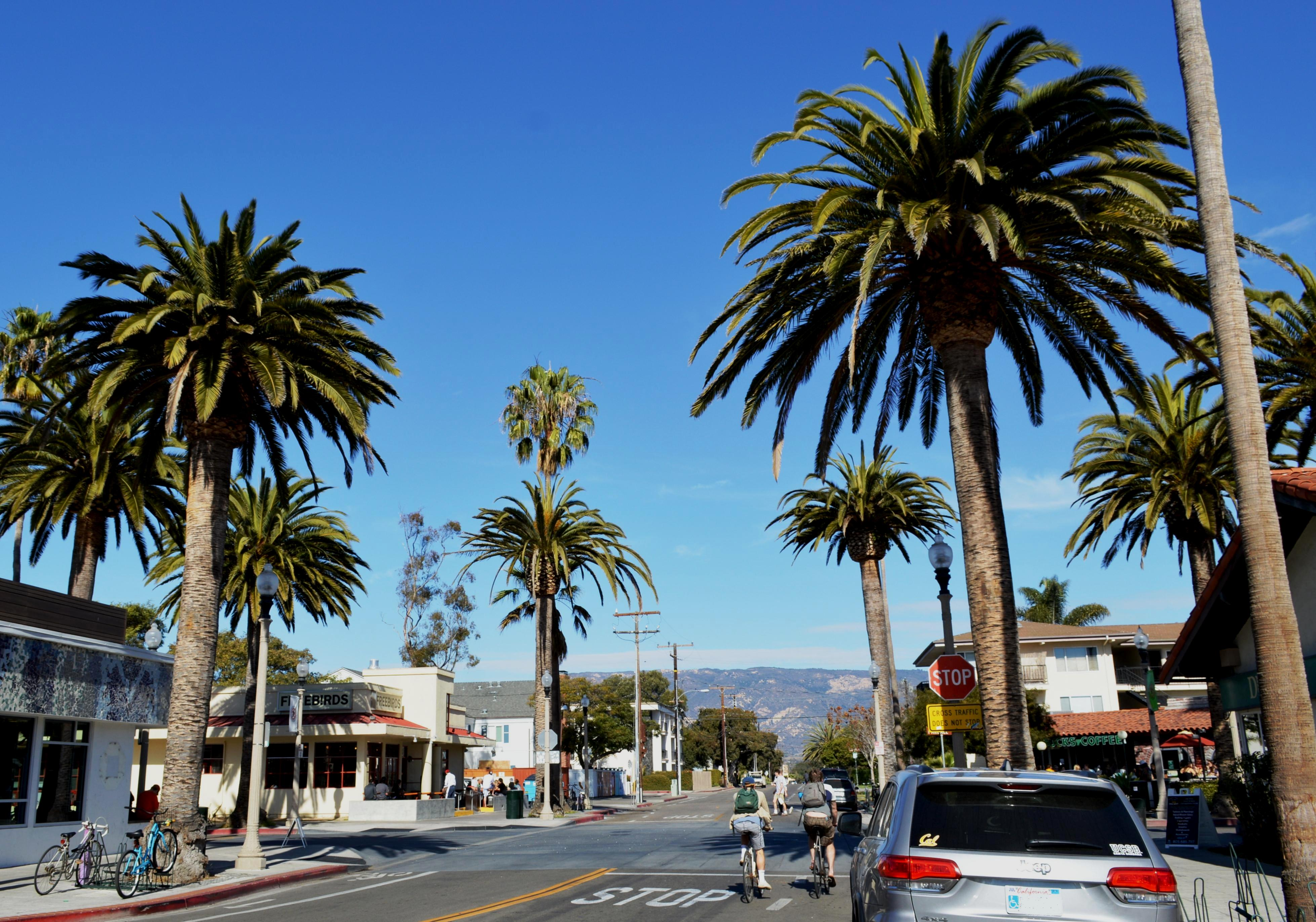
Pardall Road and Embarcadero del Norte

With a population consisting largely of UCSB and Santa Barbara City College students, Isla Vista is noted for its student and beach culture. Major events have included the Earth Day festival, Chilla Vista festival, Island View Classic bike races, Extravaganza, and All Sorority Volleyball Tournament.

=== Halloween in Isla Vista ===
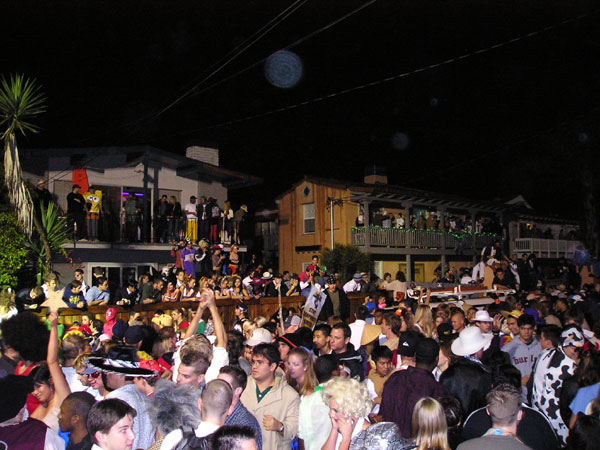
Halloween revelers on Del Playa Drive

The first notable Halloween rumpus in Isla Vista occurred in 1962. When UCSB moved from downtown Santa Barbara to Isla Vista in 1954, students were relocated from an established community to an isolated place. Some have argued that the isolation accentuated and amplified risky behaviors of some students. A festival started in the 1930s, "The Barbary Coast", where students dressed up and held events evocative of Gold Rush era San Francisco, became rowdy and was cancelled by the student government in 1959. Halloween, as an annual event in Isla Vista, took off in the late 1970s, but even at that point it involved primarily UCSB students and a few other locals. By the early 1980s, word of mouth had spread and students from schools all over California began to converge on Isla Vista for Halloween. Rowdiness in county-administered Isla Vista increased, despite admonitions of UCSB administrators. At that time, the County sheriffs deputies viewed enforcement of "quality of life" laws in Isla Vista as a low priority and consigned matters to UCSB police. A unique sharing of law enforcement responsibilities for county land between county sheriff's deputies and UCSB campus police commenced.

As the Halloween tradition grew, an increasing number of high school-aged students converged, leading to countermeasures to Halloween and generic partying in Isla Vista. In 1993, law enforcement drafted a "Five Year Plan", which included confiscation of dangerous costume props, restricted parking, zero tolerance for open alcohol on the street, increased ID checks to make sure alcohol consumers were at least 21, a strict noise ordinance, enforcement of drunk-in-public laws and restrictions on open kegs at parties. Halloween remained Isla Vista's biggest annual event for many years, often drawing crowds of 20,000–40,000 people. Each year the crowds and people became more violent and assaultive toward law enforcement, increasing the strictness. The residents and students who resided in Isla Vista tended to have a negative view of the overcrowded event, as visitors tended to litter, trashed the neighborhood, and made it impossible to find parking or even drive around.

The rowdiness and volume of the massive party culminated in a complete shut down starting around 2014. Since then, Halloween in Isla Vista now has 6:00pm noise curfews, increased foot patrol, and many streets blocked off for non-residents.

The explosive demonstrations of the 1960s changed the tenor of Isla Vista for a while and led to the establishment of the Isla Vista Foot Patrol, now a joint effort of Santa Barbara County Sheriff's Office Deputies, the University of California Police Department and the California Highway Patrol. Following the 2014 Deltopia riots, Isla Vista Foot Patrol implemented police body cameras by the end of 2015.

Halloween in 2014 had 300 police officers on call for the entire weekend. The tallies that were released by the Santa Barbara County Sheriff's office showed a decrease in citations and arrests compared to the year before on the two-day Halloween period.

== Government ==
=== Self-government ===
Isla Vista is an unincorporated community within Santa Barbara County, California. Since civil unrest in the 1970s, the community began organizing for self-rule. This culminated in the creation of the Isla Vista Recreation and Park District (IVRPD) in 1972. This was followed by creation of the Isla Vista Community Services District in 2015 with the passage of Assembly Bill 3, "Isla Vista Community Services District." Isla Vista residents passed Measure E in 2016, formally establishing the District. Additional services are provided by Isla Vista Recreation & Parks District. Measure R was passed with over 82% of the vote in 2018, establishing a utility tax to fund the Isla Vista Community Services District. It also receives funding from the University of California, Santa Barbara, and other sources as outlined in its annual budget.

=== Community efforts ===
In 2009, the UCSB Associated Students president outlined a bill emphasizing the importance of public safety in Isla Vista.

In 2013, Santa Barbara supervisor Doreen Farr said one of the ways to improve safety was to improve lighting in Isla Vista.

That same year, the Santa Barbara County Board of Supervisors approved $100,000 in community block grants to replace bulbs on Del Playa Drive, Sabado Tarde Road, Trigo Road and Pasado Road with energy-efficient LED lamps. This was accomplished as a group effort of UCSB students led by Associated Students of Local Affairs.

The Isla Vista community has also made efforts in tackling other existing issues, such as sexual assault, by educating others through UCSB's Campus Advocacy Resources and Education (CARE) program.

The creation of the Isla Vista Community Services District in 2015 led to a variety of new community services, including a Survivor Resource Center in partnership with Standing Together to End Sexual Assault (STESA), a full-time Interpersonal Violence Investigator, Homelessness Resources, a Compost Collective, a beautification program, a street lighting program, IV Safety Stations, and a Community Center that was opened in 2019.

== Media ==
=== Print ===
Since July 21, 2023, Isla Vista is served by only one adjudicated, general circulation Santa Barbara newspaper: The Santa Barbara Independent. a weekly with 40,000 audited circulation. The daily Santa Barbara News-Press (sold by the New York Times Company in 2000 to local resident Wendy P. McCaw), filed for bankruptcy and ceased publishing in July 2023. Other media available include Edhat Online Magazine, an aggregation of citizen news and links to other media websites; the Daily Nexus, UC Santa Barbara's independent student paper; The Bottom Line, UC Santa Barbara's weekly student-run newspaper; and Noozhawk, a local affairs website.

=== Television ===
- KEYT 3, an ABC television affiliate;
- KPMR 38, a Univision affiliate
- Santa Barbara Channels; 17 (Public-access television) and 21 Arts & Education (formerly owned by Cox Communications).
- Other television stations can be received from Santa Maria, San Luis Obispo, and Los Angeles.

=== Radio ===
- KJEE (92.9 MHz),
- KSBL (101.7 MHz) owned by Rincon Broadcasting
- KTYD (99.9 MHz)
- The Vibe:Hip Hop y Mas 103.3, formerly easy listening station KRUZ. It broadcasts from Broadcast Peak at an altitude of 4,060 feet (1,240 m) and can sometimes be heard in San Diego despite a distance of 200 miles (320 km) because it propagates across the ocean.

Some Los Angeles and San Diego radio stations can be heard, although somewhat faintly due to the 85-mile (137 km) distance. Santa Monica-based NPR radio station KCRW can be heard in Santa Barbara at 106.9 MHz, and San Luis Obispo-based NPR station KCBX at 89.5 MHz and 90.9 MHz. There is an NPR station, KCLU (102.3 FM, 1340 AM), that has a news team in Santa Barbara and covers stories, news and programming for the area. The only non-commercial radio station based in Santa Barbara is KCSB-FM, at 91.9 MHz, which is housed on the UC Santa Barbara campus and funded by the students of University of California, Santa Barbara.

== Notable people ==
- Urijah Faber, mixed martial artist
- Jay Freeman, creator of Cydia, iOS package manager

== See also ==
- Campus Point State Marine Conservation Area
- Hodgkins and Skubic House
- Isla Vista Arts
- Isla Vista virus
