= 2001 Isla Vista killings =

Vehicular assault in Isla Vista, California

- Isla Vista (southern California) Isla Vista (the United States)
- Location: 34.4104°N 119.8538°W; Isla Vista, California, U.S.
- Date: February 23, 2001; 25 years ago ≈ 11:00 p.m. (PST UTC−8:00)
- Target: Pedestrians
- Attack type: Vehicular homicide, mass murder
- Weapon: 1991 Saab 9000
- Deaths: 5 (including a victim who died in 2016)
- Injuries: 0
- Charges: Murder (driving under the influence)
- Convictions: Four counts of second-degree murder
- Convicted: David Attias

On February 23, 2001, a vehicular homicide and assault occurred in the student community of Isla Vista, California, near the University of California, Santa Barbara (UCSB) campus. Four people were killed and a fifth, who suffered critical injuries, died in October 2016. The driver, David Attias (son of television director Dan Attias), was ruled legally insane and sentenced to 60 years in a mental institution. In September 2012, a court approved Attias' release after 10 years.

== Details ==
On the evening of February 23, 2001, just after 11:00 p.m., UCSB student David Attias, the 18-year-old son of television director Dan Attias, drove his father's 1991 Saab 9000 down the 6500 block of Sabado Tarde Road at a speed of 50 to 65 miles per hour. He killed four pedestrians and critically injured a fifth.

According to witnesses, Attias got out and yelled "I am the Angel of Death!" He continued to taunt a growing crowd, until he was subdued by the first CHP officer to arrive on the scene. It was initially unclear if Attias was affected by drugs or if the attack was intentional. Blood tests later showed that Attias was under the influence of marijuana and Lidocaine, but neither were deemed significant to the incident.

=== Victims ===
Four people were killed in the assault: 20-year-old UCSB students Nicholas Bourdakis and Christopher Divis, 27-year-old San Francisco resident Elie Israel, and 20-year-old Santa Barbara City College student Ruth Levy. A fifth person, Albert Arthur Levy, 27, Ruth's brother, was critically injured but survived. His injuries consisted of crushed legs and a severely battered head, and he died in October 2016 after having seizures for years caused by the injury.

== Aftermath ==
=== Trial ===
Attias was charged with four counts of murder, four counts of vehicular manslaughter with gross negligence, and five counts of felony driving under the influence. Residents of his hall told police and the campus paper that Attias had been known for his erratic behavior, including stalking another student. Several students referred to him as "Crazy Dave" and "Tweaker." The case received additional media attention because David Attias is the son of Dan Attias, a prominent Hollywood TV director. Attias pleaded not guilty by reason of insanity, and his trial sparked significant interest.

On June 11, 2002, Attias was convicted in a jury trial of four counts of second-degree murder. He was acquitted of driving under the influence. One week later, the same jury found that Attias was legally insane. This resulted in a sentence of up to 60 years at Patton State Hospital in San Bernardino.

=== Memorial ===
A memorial to the victims was installed in Little Acorn Park. The park borders the intersection where Attias struck and killed them.

=== Release ===
While at Patton, Attias was treated for substance abuse, bipolar disorder and pervasive developmental disorder. In May 2012, Attias asked the courts to transfer him from Patton to an outpatient psychiatric facility, stating he has his bipolar disorder under control. The news of his request prompted expressions of concern about his potential risk of relapse or danger from survivors and family of his victims at court hearings on this proposed action. Testimony was heard from mental health professionals. Attias was given a conditional release from Patton State and transferred to a supervised "unlocked outpatient treatment program" on September 4, 2012.

== See also ==
- List of homicides in California
