= Swank Motion Pictures =

American film distributor

Swank Motion Pictures, Inc. is an international, non-theatrical, film distributor and licensor. Founded in 1937, it is privately owned and operated by the Swank family. It is one of the world's largest non-theatrical distributors of motion pictures for public performance. Based in Sunset Hills, a suburb of St. Louis, Swank also maintains a sales office in Paris.

Swank represents major Hollywood and independent movie studios to distribute movies licensed for public performance to non-theatrical venues.

== Studios represented ==
- A24 Films
- CBS Films
- Cohen Media
- Columbia Pictures
- DreamWorks Pictures
- eOne Entertainment
- Fine Line Features
- Focus Features
- Hallmark Hall of Fame
- HBO
- Hollywood Pictures
- Image Entertainment
- Lionsgate
- Magnolia Pictures
- MGM
- Millennium Entertainment
- Miramax Films
- Monterey Media
- National Geographic
- New Line Cinema
- Paramount Pictures
- Relativity Media
- Sony Pictures
- Summit Entertainment
- Touchstone Pictures
- TriStar Pictures
- United Artists
- Universal Studios
- Walt Disney Pictures
- Warner Bros.
- Warner Independent Pictures
- The Weinstein Company
- other independent studios

== Public performance licensing ==
Swank Motion Pictures provides both public performance licensing rights and licensed movies to numerous non-theatrical markets.

- Public performance: any performance, display, exhibition, showing, etc. of a copyrighted piece of work that occurs outside of a home.
- Non-theatrical: any venue, other than a theater, that is outside of the home.

== Non-theatrical venues ==
- U.S. colleges and universities
- Worldwide cruise lines
- Parks and recreation facilities
- K–12 schools
- Libraries
- Correctional facilities
- Museums
- Film societies
- Restaurants
- Bars
- Churches, synagogues and other faith-based organizations
- Businesses
- Trade shows and conventions
- Healthcare facilities
- American military hospitals
- Motor coaches
- Amtrak trains
- Clubs
- Camps and other outdoor venues

== History ==
Swank Motion Pictures, Inc. was founded in 1937 by P. Ray Swank and began operations in St. Louis as a "portable projection service." This period predated such familiar entertainment standards as color film, 35mm slides, audiotape and television. The company's projection service consisted of providing short entertainment films and slides, the motion picture projector, sound system and lantern slide projector. These services, along with the equipment operators, were provided at locations where customers were conducting meetings. These local organizations, civic groups, schools and churches relied on Swank to "set up and run the show" for their entertainment. Over the years the needs for equipment and the actual movie separated, and, in turn, so did the company.

The two divisions became known as Swank Motion Pictures, which provided the licensed movie content, and Swank Audio Visuals, which provided the audiovisual equipment. The audiovisual division gradually migrated to working primarily with hotels as an in-house service. Swank Audio Visuals was sold by the Swank family in the 2000s.

Swank Motion Pictures, Inc. continues to distribute licensed motion pictures to non-theatrical markets both domestically and internationally.

== Divisions of Swank Motion Pictures, Inc. ==
- Digital Campus
- Motorcoach Movies
- Movie Licensing USA
- On-Board Movies
- Residence Life Cinema
- Swank Films Distribution France
- Swank Filmverleih, Germany
- Swank Motion Pictures
