= Rancho San Emidio =

Mexican land grant in Kern County, California

Coordinates: 34.970°N 119.220°W

Rancho San Emidio was a 17,710-acre (71.7 km^{2}) Mexican land grant in present-day Kern County, California given in 1842 by Governor Juan Alvarado to José Antonio Dominguez. The grant was located along San Emigdio Creek in the northeastern foothills of the San Emigdio Mountains, between Santiago Creek on the west and Pleitito Creek on the east.

There is speculation on the name. Either it is an alternative spelling of San Emigdio (Saint Emygdius the protector Saint against earthquakes), or an intentional corruption, meant as a witticism since "emidio" means tired or weary. The rancho was established at a way stop at the foot of San Emigdio Canyon on El Camino Viejo ('the old road,' 18th-19th century) that ran along the eastern edge of the San Joaquin Valley from Pueblo de Los Angeles to the Mission Santa Clara de Asís and later on to Rancho San Antonio, on San Francisco Bay.

== History ==
José Antonio Dominguez (1796–1844), was a soldier at the Presidio of Santa Barbara. In 1819 Dominguez married Maria Francisca Antonia Villa. Their daughter, Maria Antonia Dominguez, was later the grantee of Rancho Sisquoc (to west near present-day Lompoc). José Antonio Dominguez received the four square league Rancho San Emidio in 1842. Dominguez died during the winter of 1843-44, and his widow and seven children moved back to Santa Barbara. John C. Frémont acquired a half interest in the rancho from the Dominguez heirs.

With the cession of California to the United States following the Mexican-American War, the 1848 Treaty of Guadalupe Hidalgo provided that the land grants would be honored. As required by the Land Act of 1851, a claim for Rancho San Emidio was filed with the Public Land Commission in 1853, and the grant was patented to Francisco Dominguez and John C. Frémont in 1866.

The Dominguez half share was sold to David W. Alexander and Francisco P. Temple, who sold to E.C. Singletary. In 1860, the Frémont half share went to his daughter, Frances Cornelia Fremont Porter, who in 1868 sold to Edward Fitzgerald Beale, owner the Tejon Ranch. Beale sold the share to E.C. Singletary in 1877. In 1878, James Ben Ali Haggin bought the whole rancho from E.C. Singletary (who may have been acting as an agent for Haggin). Haggin transferred the rancho to the Kern County Land Company on its incorporation in 1890. Tenneco acquired Kern County Land in 1970. In 1996, The Wildlands Conservancy acquired the land, which is now its Wind Wolves Preserve.

== See also ==
- El Camino Viejo topics
- List of Ranchos of California
- Ranchos of Kern County, California
