= Blue Ridge National Wildlife Refuge =

Nature preserve in California, United States

- IUCN category IV (habitat/species management area)
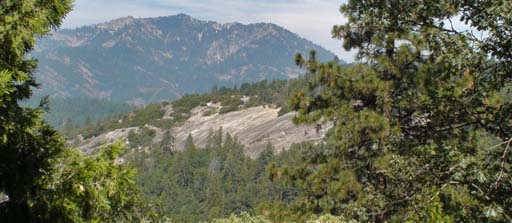

- Location within California Location within the United States
- Location: Tulare County, California, United States
- Nearest city: Springville, California
- Coordinates: 36.2798°N 118.8446°W
- Area: 897 acres (3.63 km^{2})
- Established: 1982
- Governing body: U.S. Fish and Wildlife Service
- Website: Blue Ridge National Wildlife Refuge

Blue Ridge National Wildlife Refuge is located in the Sierra Nevada, in Tulare County, California. The refuge is one of four units of the Hopper Mountain National Wildlife Refuge Complex for California condors.

== Geography ==
The Blue Ridge National Wildlife Refuge is part of the cooperatively-managed Blue Ridge Wildlife Habitat Area, an 11,000-acre (45 km^{2}) area set aside as an important roosting area located close to historic nesting and foraging habitat for the California condor. This refuge consists of almost 900 acres (3.6 km^{2}) of coniferous forests dominated by Ponderosa Pine and Incense Cedar.

As of July 2014, there is a total population of 437 condors living in sites in California, Baja California and Arizona. This includes a wild population of 232 and a captive population of 205. 68 free-flying Condors are managed by the US Fish & Wildlife Service in Southern California.

=== Owners ===
There are three principal private owners, and four public owners:

- U.S. Fish and Wildlife Service
- Bureau of Land Management
- USDA Forest Service
- California Department of Fish and Game.
