= San Emigdio Creek =

San Emigdio Creek San Emidio Creek
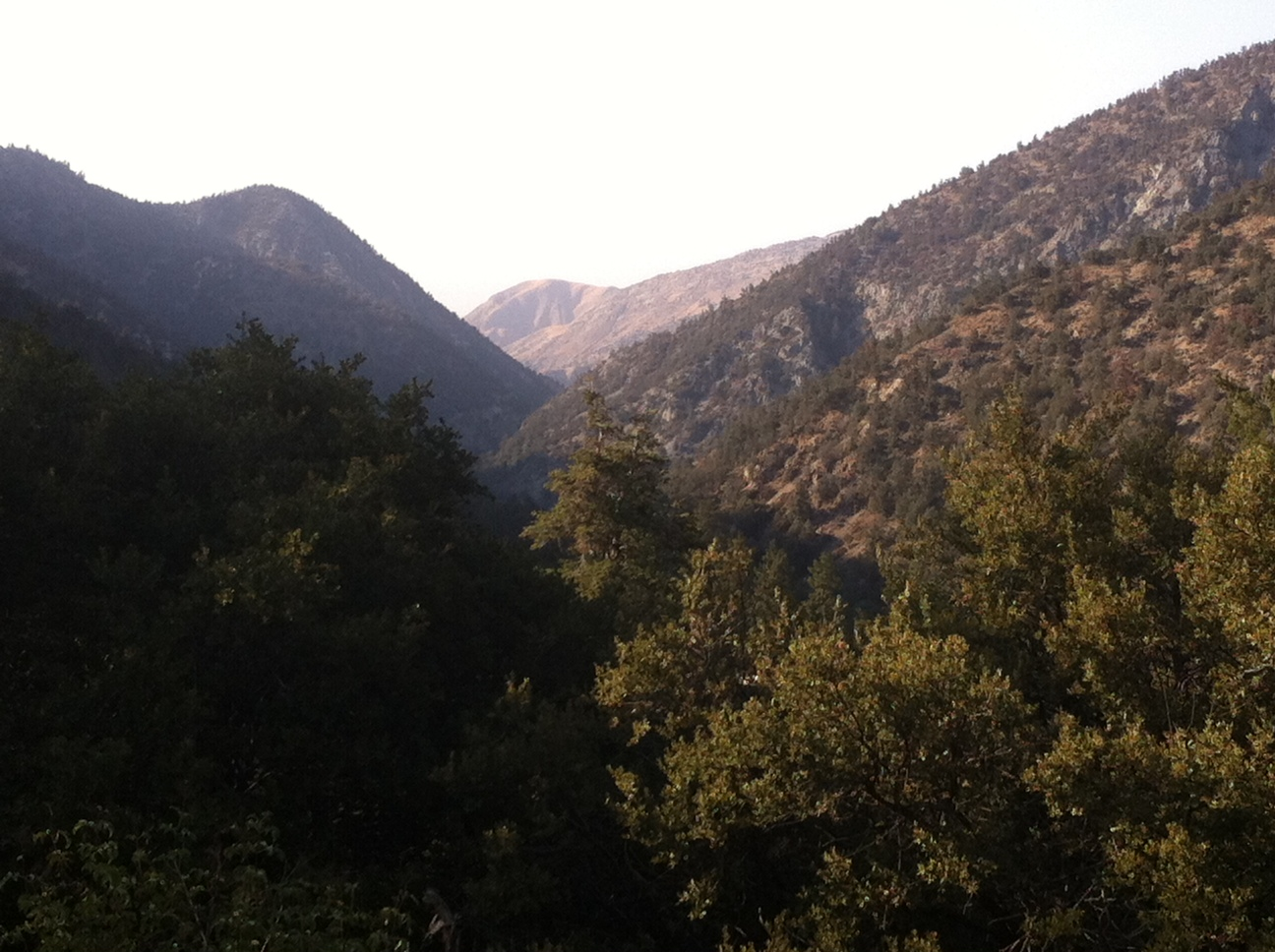
- San Emigdio Creek Canyon in the San Emigdio Mountains, looking north
- Etymology: Spanish
- Native name: Arroyo de San Emigdio (Spanish)

Location
- Country: United States
- State: California
- Region: Kern County

Physical characteristics
- Source: source
  - location: Mount Pinos (northeast slopes), San Emigdio Mountains
  - coordinates: 34°49′42″N 119°06′03″W
  - elevation: 7,000 ft (2,100 m)
- Mouth: mouth
  - location: 4 miles southwest of Lake View (Kern County), San Joaquin Valley
  - coordinates: 35°03′31″N 119°10′49″W
  - elevation: 597 ft (182 m)

San Emigdio Creek, formerly Arroyo de San Emigdio (Spanish for Saint Emygdius Creek), is a 33 kilometres (21 mi) northward-flowing stream in western Kern County, central California.

== Geography ==
The San Emigdio Creek headwaters are on the northeast slope of Mount Pinos, 2 miles (3.2 km) south of Tecuya Ridge in the San Emigdio Mountains. The creek flows north through San Emigdio Canyon before reaching the western San Joaquin Valley, where it terminates 4 miles (6.4 km) southwest of Lakeview.

A substantial portion of the creek's course lies within the Wind Wolves Preserve, where the corridor extends from the valley floor into San Emigdio Canyon and meets the boundary of Los Padres National Forest.

In years of heavy rainfall it would be a tributary to the Connecting Slough, the slough between Kern Lake and Buena Vista Lake which has been dry for decades due to agricultural diversion, pumping, and a lowering groundwater table.

== Public access and conservation ==
San Emigdio Creek is primarily accessible through the Wind Wolves Preserve, a nature reserve managed by The Wildlands Conservancy. Trails follow the creek along the lower riparian zone and continue into San Emigdio Canyon, providing public access well into the mountains. The preserve's corridor connects with Los Padres National Forest, allowing for extended hiking opportunities along the creek.

== History ==
Arroyo San Emigdio was a stream whose canyon provided the route followed by the 18th–19th century El Camino Viejo, through the San Emigdio Mountains between the Cuddy Valley and San Joaquin Valley. Its mouth provided a watering place between Cuddy Valley in the south and Arroyo de Amargosa (Bitterwater Creek) to the northwest near Buena Vista Lake.

The place where the creek emerged from the foothills of the San Emigdio Mountains was the location of Mexican land grant Rancho San Emidio of Alta California, granted in 1842 to José Antonio Dominguez. The location was a rancho and station of Mission Santa Barbara as early as 1824, and the 1842 land grant continued the rancho.

== See also ==
- Wind Wolves Preserve
