= Hopper Mountain National Wildlife Refuge Complex =

Coordinates: 35.3°N 118.8°W

Hopper Mountain National Wildlife Refuge Complex is a National Wildlife Refuge complex in the state of California.

== Refuges within the complex ==
- Bitter Creek National Wildlife Refuge
- Blue Ridge National Wildlife Refuge
- Hopper Mountain National Wildlife Refuge
- Guadalupe-Nipomo Dunes National Wildlife Refuge
