= Rancho Sisquoc =

Land grant in California

Coordinates: 34.850°N 120.130°W

Rancho Sisquoc was a 35,486-acre (143.61 km^{2}) Mexican land grant and current winery in the San Rafael Mountains region of present-day northeastern Santa Barbara County, California.

It was given in 1845 by Governor Pío Pico to María Antonia Dominguez de Caballero. The grant extended along the Sisquoc River, east of present-day Lompoc.

== History ==
Francisco Cavalleri (1814 –1877) (often spelt "Caballero") came to Santa Barbara in 1838 and married Maria Antonia Dominguez (1828–1874) in 1841. Maria's father, José Antonio Dominguez (1796–1844), was the grantee of Rancho San Emidio. Maria's grandfather, Ildefonso Dominguez, came to California as a soldier with the 1781 Rivera expedition. Maria Antonia Dominguez de Cavalleri was granted the eight square league Rancho Sisquoc in 1845. After Maria's death, Francisco Cavalleri married Ramona Pico (1831-) in 1876.

In 1851 Francisco Cavalleri and Maria Antonia Dominguez, sold the grant to James B. Huie. Huie was chairman of the first San Francisco Committee of Vigilance.

With the cession of California to the United States following the Mexican-American War, the 1848 Treaty of Guadalupe Hidalgo provided that the land grants would be honored. As required by the Land Act of 1851, a claim for Rancho Sisquoc was filed with the Public Land Commission in 1852, and the grant was patented to James B. Huie et al. in 1866.

In the 1880s, the rancho was acquired by San Francisco hardware store operator, Rockwell Stone (1806–1887). His son and daughter inherited the rancho. His son, Lucius D. Stone, went bankrupt in 1888, and lost his share through foreclosure to William Harris. John T. Porter and Thomas B. Bishop acquired the daughter's interest in 1892, and the Harris interest in 1893. The two men formed the Sisquoc Investment Company in 1899.

In 1952, the ranch was purchased by members of the Flood family, who currently operate it as a winery.

== See also ==
- Ranchos of Santa Barbara County, California
- San Rafael Mountains range
- List of Ranchos of California
