= Bitter Creek National Wildlife Refuge =

Wildlife refuge in Kern County, California

- IUCN category IV (habitat/species management area)
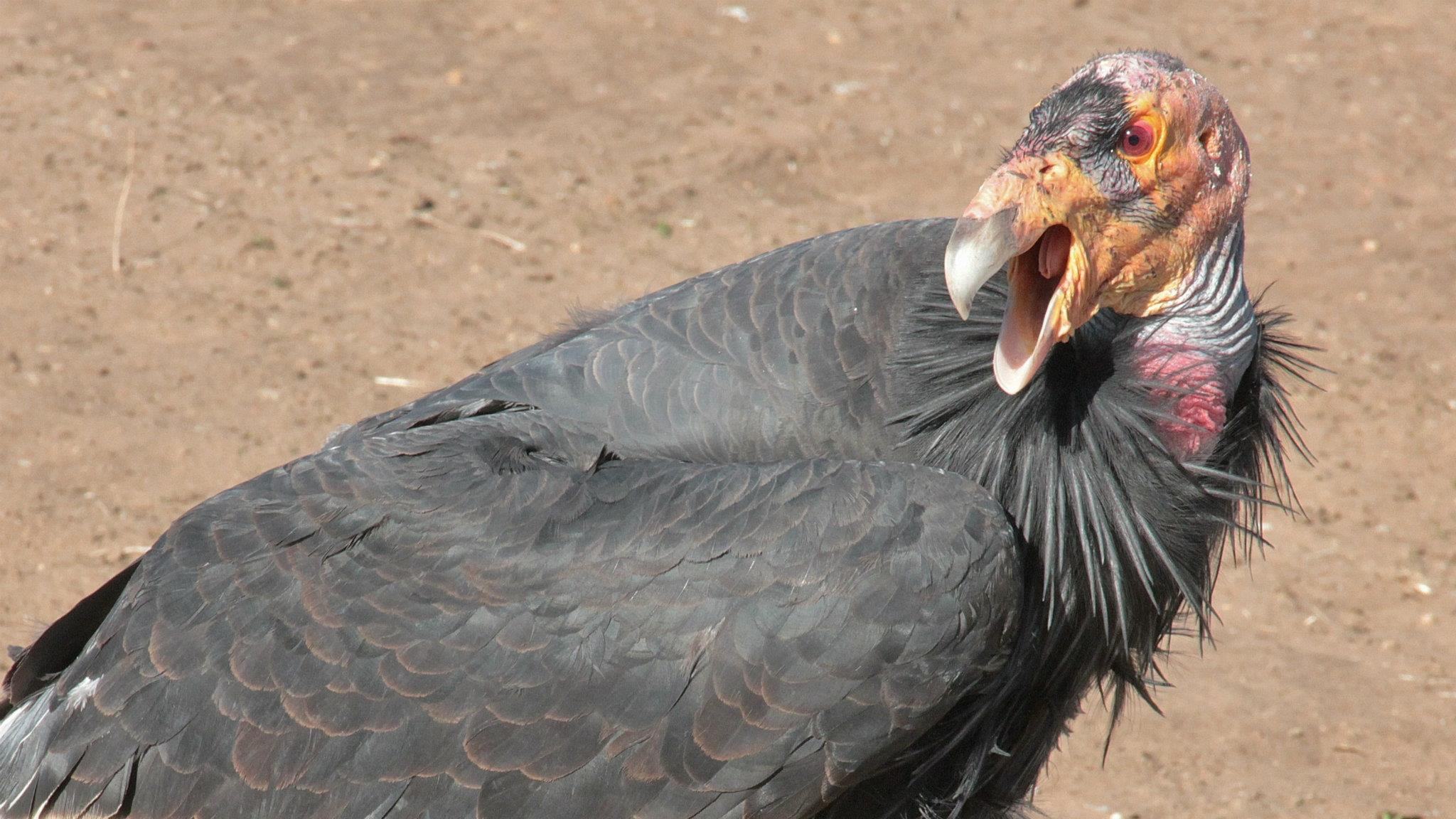
- California condor at the refuge

- Location within southern California Location within California Location within the United States
- Interactive map of Bitter Creek National Wildlife Refuge
- Location: Kern County, California, United States
- Nearest city: Maricopa, California
- Coordinates: 34.9383°N 119.3865°W
- Area: 14,097 acres (57.05 km^{2})
- Max. elevation: 4,680 feet (1,430 m)
- Min. elevation: 1,600 feet (490 m)
- Established: 1985
- Governing body: U.S. Fish and Wildlife Service
- Website: Bitter Creek National Wildlife Refuge

The Bitter Creek National Wildlife Refuge is located in the foothills of the southwestern San Joaquin Valley in Kern County, California. The refuge is one of four units of the Hopper Mountain National Wildlife Refuge Complex for California condors.

== Geography ==
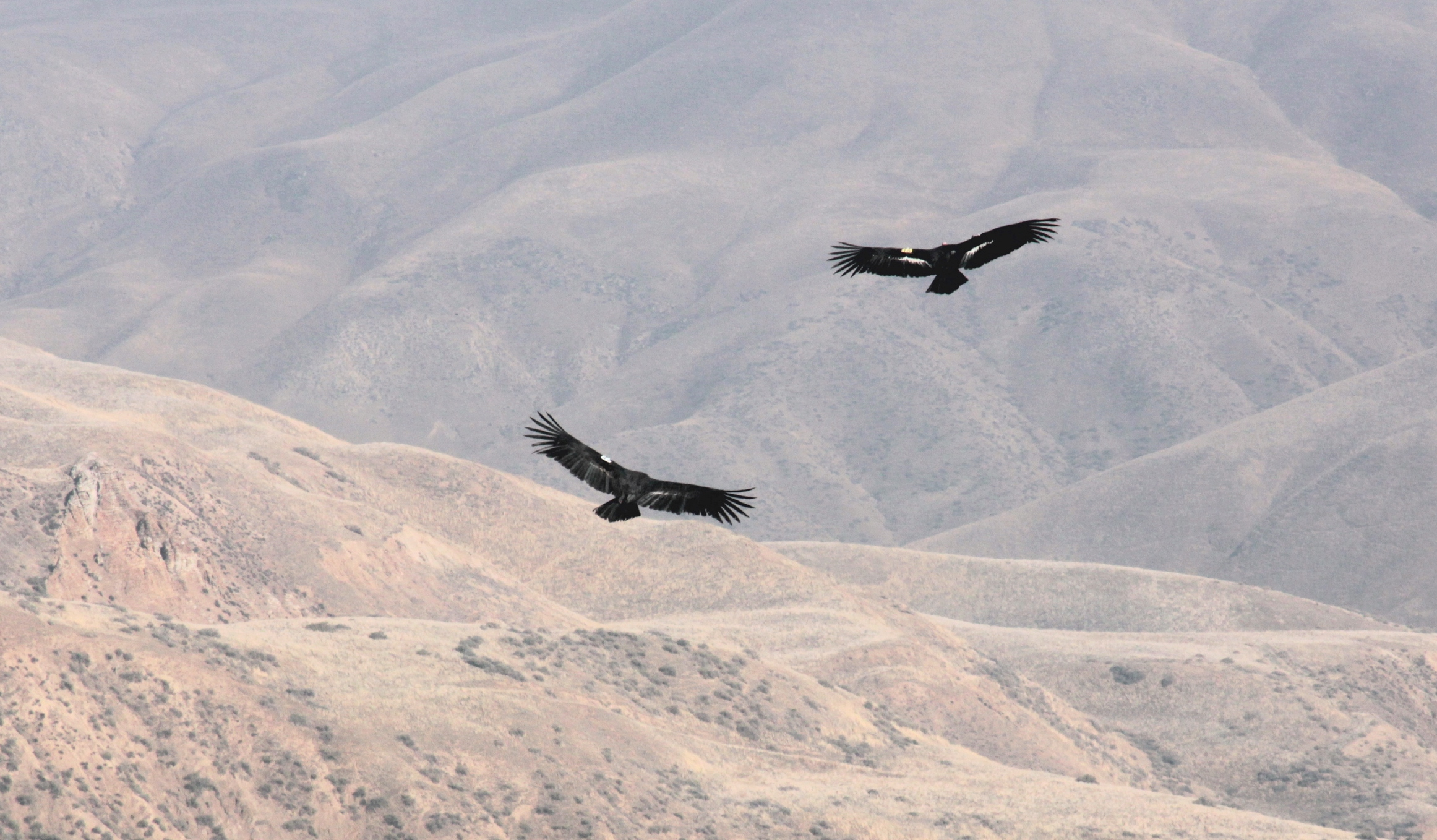
Condors flying over canyons

The San Andreas Fault Rift Zone bisects the refuge from northwest to southeast and has contributed to the formation of steep canyons within the refuge, including Bitter Creek Canyon.

The South Coast Missing Linkages plan identifies the refuge within several regional connections, including the Tehachapi, Santa Monica–Sierra Madre, and Sierra Madre–Castaic linkages.

== Flora and fauna ==
The refuge is a major location used by California condors for feeding and roosting, with high use relative to nearby sites. The refuge is an integral part of the Service's condor monitoring activities.

The refuge has been used for California condor trapping, monitoring, health examinations, and release management activities.

In addition to the California condor, the Bitter Creek Refuge provides grassland, oak woodland, chaparral, pinion pine/juniper/oak woodland, and riparian and wetland habitat for federally listed endangered San Joaquin kit fox, blunt-nosed leopard lizard, giant kangaroo rat, and species of Federal concern such as the western spadefoot toad, the western horned lizard and the tri-colored blackbird.

Other terrestrial species on the refuge include coyote, bobcat, mountain lion, mule deer, pronghorn, tule elk, and western rattlesnake. A total of 119 bird species have been recorded on the refuge including 90 migratory species.

Some tule elk on the refuge dispersed from herds reintroduced at Wind Wolves Preserve in 1998 and 2005.

== History ==
This region was used as a cattle ranch prior to creation of the refuge.

The refuge was established in 1985 to preserve essential foraging and roosting habitat for the California condor

The last wild condor was trapped here in 1987.

== Recreation ==
Public access is limited to guided interpretive tours. No general public access is allowed since focus is protecting the sensitive California condor habitat.

== See also ==
- Wind Wolves Preserve
- Carrizo Plain
