= Thomas B. Bishop =

American lawyer

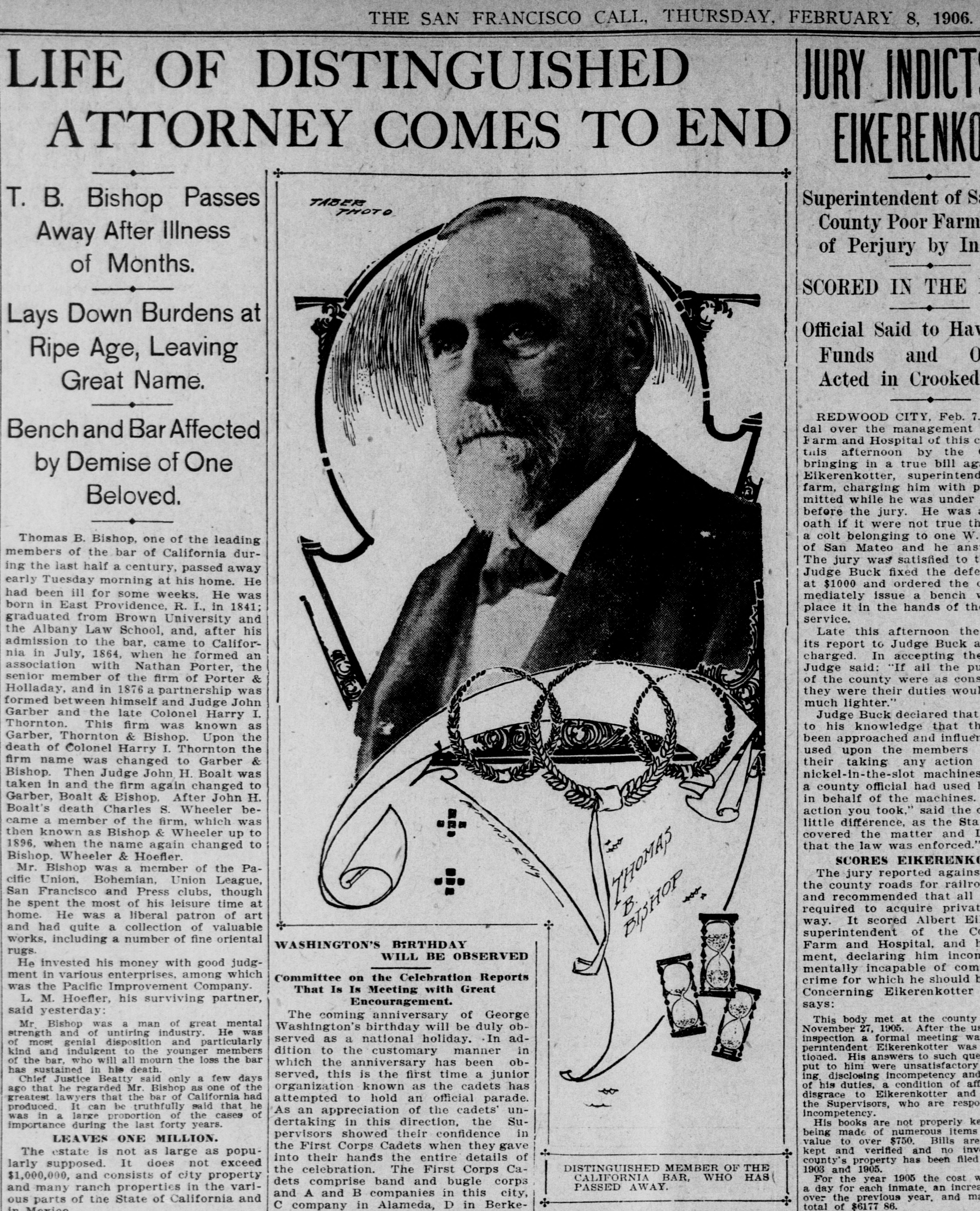
The San Francisco Call, February 8, 1906, with notice of Bishop's death

Thomas Benton Bishop (1840 – February 8, 1906) was a well-known and successful San Francisco attorney.

== Biography ==
Bishop practiced law as Garber, Thornton & Bishop; Garber, Boalt & Bishop; Garber & Bishop; Bishop& Wheeler; Bishop, Wheeler & Hoefler; and as Bishop, Hoefler, Cook & Harwood.

In 1890, Bishop acquired one third of Rancho Dos Pueblos in Santa Barbara County as payment for a lawsuit by the heirs of Nicolas A. Den against Colonel W.W. Hollister (1818 - 1886). Bishop took title of the ranch and renamed it Corona del Mar. The balance of the ranch went to the Den heirs. Bishop did not spend much time at the ranch as he lived in his palatial home in Pacific Heights in San Francisco.

In 1892, Bishop acquired Rancho Sisquoc in Santa Barbara County. In 1894, Bishop argued the U.S. Supreme Court case California Powder Works vs Isaac E. Davis over title to Rancho Cañada del Rincon en el Rio San Lorenzo in Santa Cruz County.

In 1895, Bishop acquired 3,000 acres (12 km^{2}) of Norris land (after a divorce case in which Bishop's law firm represented Margaret Norris) in San Ramon. The San Ramon Bishop Ranch raised cattle and sheep and was planted to hay, grain, diversified fruit crops and walnuts. Bishop's Shropshire purebred sheep earned numerous awards. The Ranch was partially irrigated from an underground aquifer and at one point possessed the world's largest single orchard of Bartlett pears.

Josephine Hall Bishop (1841 - 1917), wife of Thomas Benton Bishop, collected and maintained her own private museum on Washington Street in San Francisco.
