= Wind Wolves Preserve =

Nature preserve in Kern County, California

- IUCN category V (protected landscape/seascape)
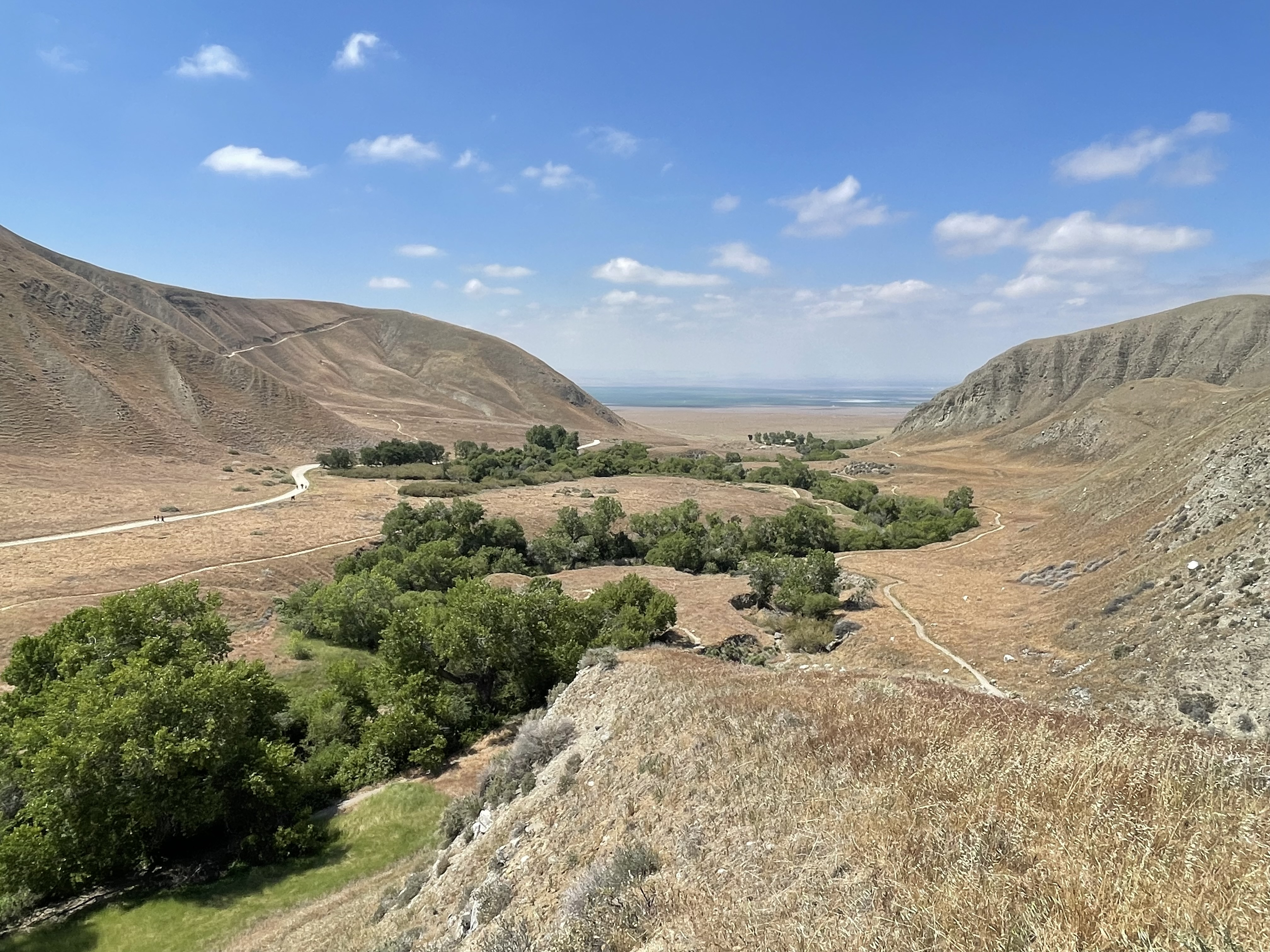
- San Emigdio Canyon riparian zone

- Location within California
- Interactive map of Wind Wolves Preserve
- Location: Kern County, California
- Nearest city: Maricopa, California
- Coordinates: 34°59′3″N 119°11′13″W
- Area: 93,000 acres (38,000 ha)
- Max. elevation: 6,005 ft (1,830 m)
- Min. elevation: 640 ft (200 m)
- Created: 1996
- Visitors: 80000 (in 2022)
- Operator: The Wildlands Conservancy
- Website: Wind Wolves Preserve

Wind Wolves Preserve is a nature preserve in the southern Transverse Ranges at the edge of California's Central Valley, where grasslands transition into oak woodlands and higher-elevation forests. The property borders Los Padres National Forest and forms part of the regional wildlife corridor linking the Sierra Nevada and Coast Range. The preserve supports wildlife such as tule elk and contains Native American archaeological sites. The 93,000 acres (38,000 ha) preserve is owned and managed by The Wildlands Conservancy as part of its system of preserves.

== Geography ==
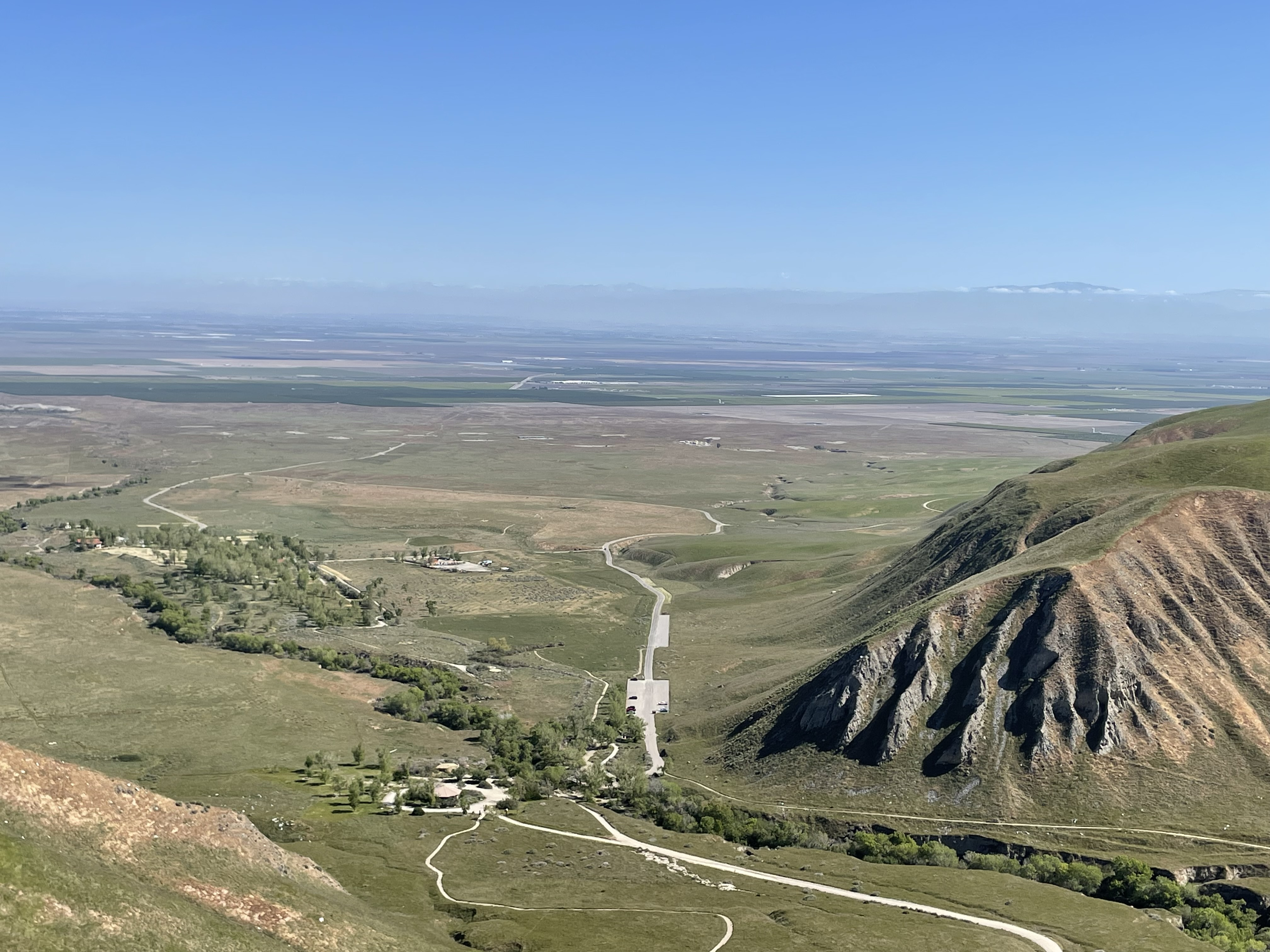
Mouth of San Emigdio Canyon

The preserve lies at the southern edge of the Central Valley, in a region where the land rises into the Transverse Ranges. It includes the San Emigdio Mountains and Pleito Hills, with elevations ranging from 640 feet (200 m) to 6,005 feet (1,830 m). Terrain within the preserve varies from grasslands near the valley floor to woodlands and montane habitats at higher elevations.

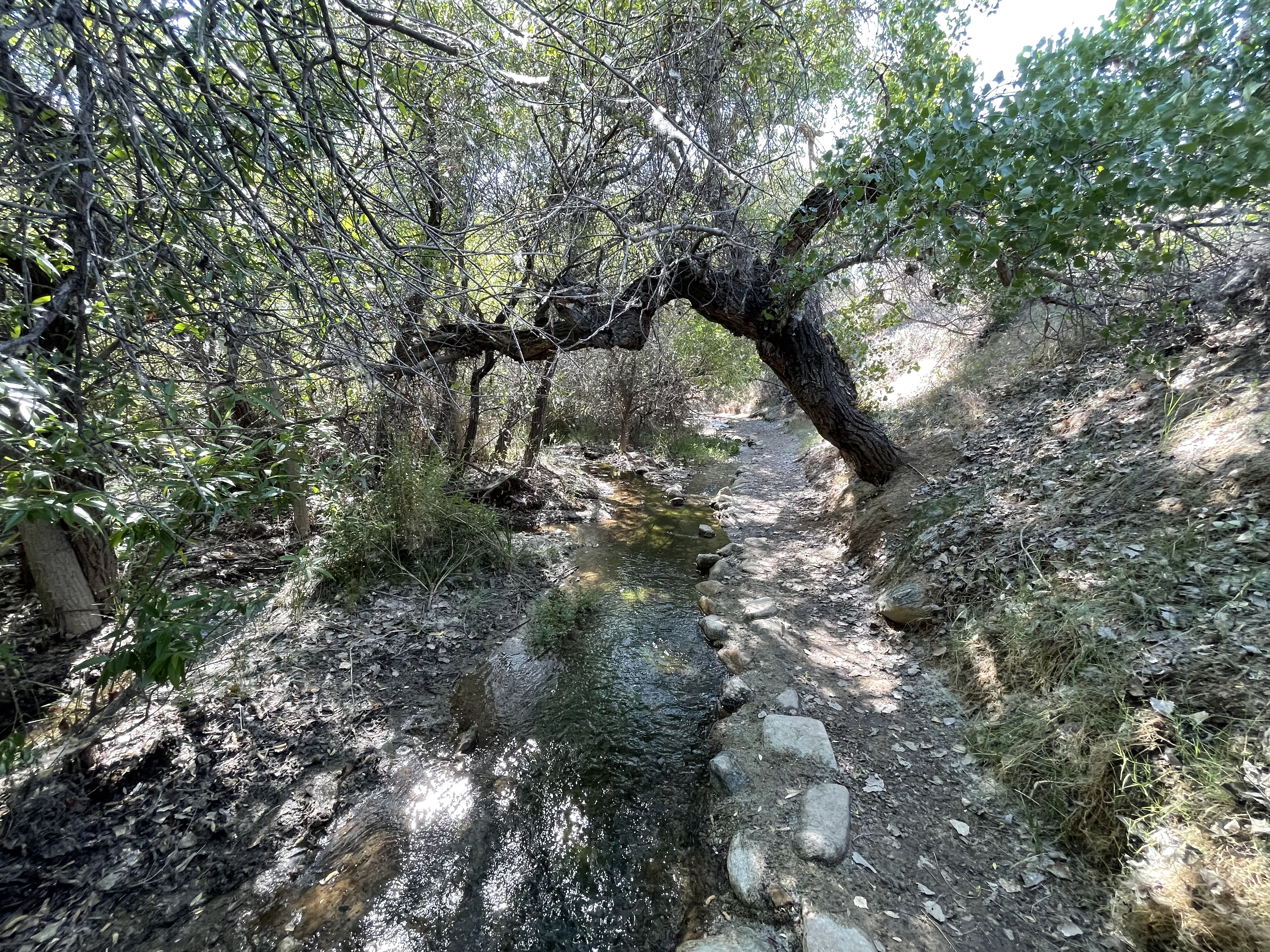
San Emigdio Creek under riparian canopy

Multiple canyons cut through the preserve. San Emigdio Canyon includes San Emigdio Creek, a perennial stream.

Wind Wolves Preserve is part of a regional wildlife corridor linking the Sierra Nevada and Coast Range. Nearby conserved lands include Tejon Ranch and the Frank and Joan Randall Preserve. The South Coast Missing Linkages plan identifies the preserve within several regional connections, including the Tehachapi, Santa Monica–Sierra Madre, and Sierra Madre–Castaic linkages.

== Flora and fauna ==
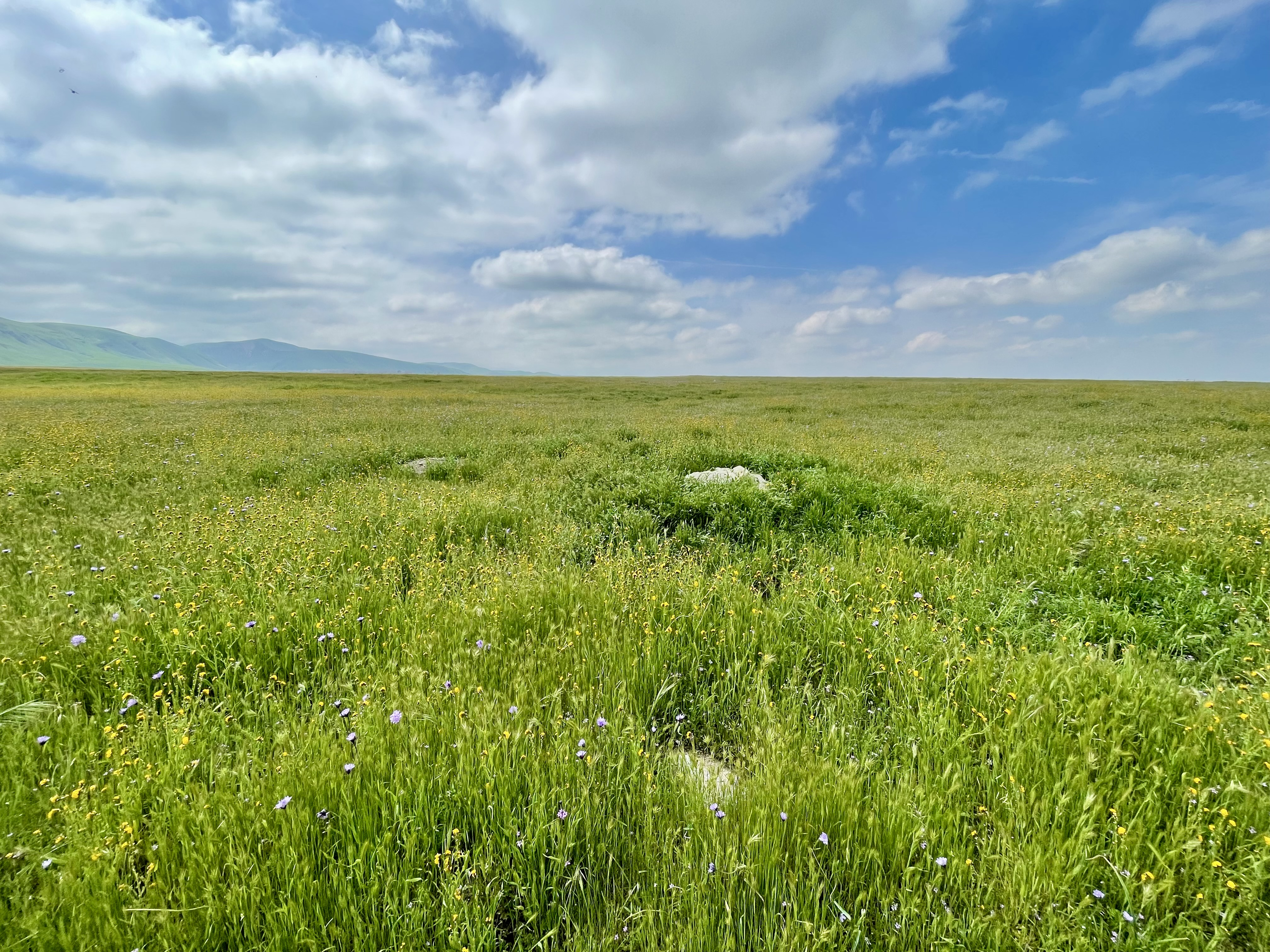
Wildflower Loop Trail

Wind Wolves Preserve includes grasslands, oak savanna, riparian wetlands, pinyon, juniper, and conifer forests. Wildlife includes tule elk and tricolored blackbirds.

Surveys conducted in 2010–2011 documented a range of plant, animal, and bird species at the preserve, including several sensitive species.

The preserve supports a large population of tule elk. In 1998, 19 elk were translocated by the California Department of Fish and Wildlife, the first of 88 elk reintroduced between 1998 and 2005. Inventories are conducted every fall with the help of volunteer teams that survey different areas of the preserve. In 2022, 445 elk were counted.

The preserve is used by California condors as part of a broader foraging and movement area, with moderate use relative to nearby core sites such as Bitter Creek National Wildlife Refuge.

In 2015, thousands of tricolored blackbirds were observed nesting at the preserve. Wetland restoration has supported more than 5,000 nesting pairs along Pleito Creek.

Endangered species recorded at the preserve include the Buena Vista Lake shrew, blunt-nosed leopard lizard, and the Bakersfield cactus. A study examined conservation done for the Bakersfield cactus. A 2011 assessment identified the preserve as a potential site for reintroduction of the endangered San Joaquin kit fox based on habitat extent and landscape connectivity.

== Archaeology ==
The preserve contains Native American archaeological sites. Pleito is a Chumash rock art site associated with the Rock art of the Chumash people, and Cache Cave contains artifacts.

Research at these sites has used noninvasive techniques to study pigments, superimposed paintings, and fragile basketry. Methods include portable X-ray fluorescence, reflectance transformation imaging, and 3D scanning. At the Three Springs rockshelter, analysis identified "Emigdiano Blue", a visual effect produced by combining black and white materials rather than a true blue mineral pigment.

A research project ("Unravelling the Gordian Knot") combined pXRF, Raman spectroscopy, photogrammetry, and other methods to analyze Pleito's superimposed imagery and create a detailed 3D model. Researchers later developed a virtual-reality platform that allowed archaeologists, land managers, and Native American stakeholders to remotely examine Pleito's imagery. At one point, the preserve provided headsets for visitors to explore the sites virtually.

Archaeological research at Pinwheel Cave in the Tehachapi foothills examined evidence regarding the use of hallucinogens in rock art contexts.

== History ==
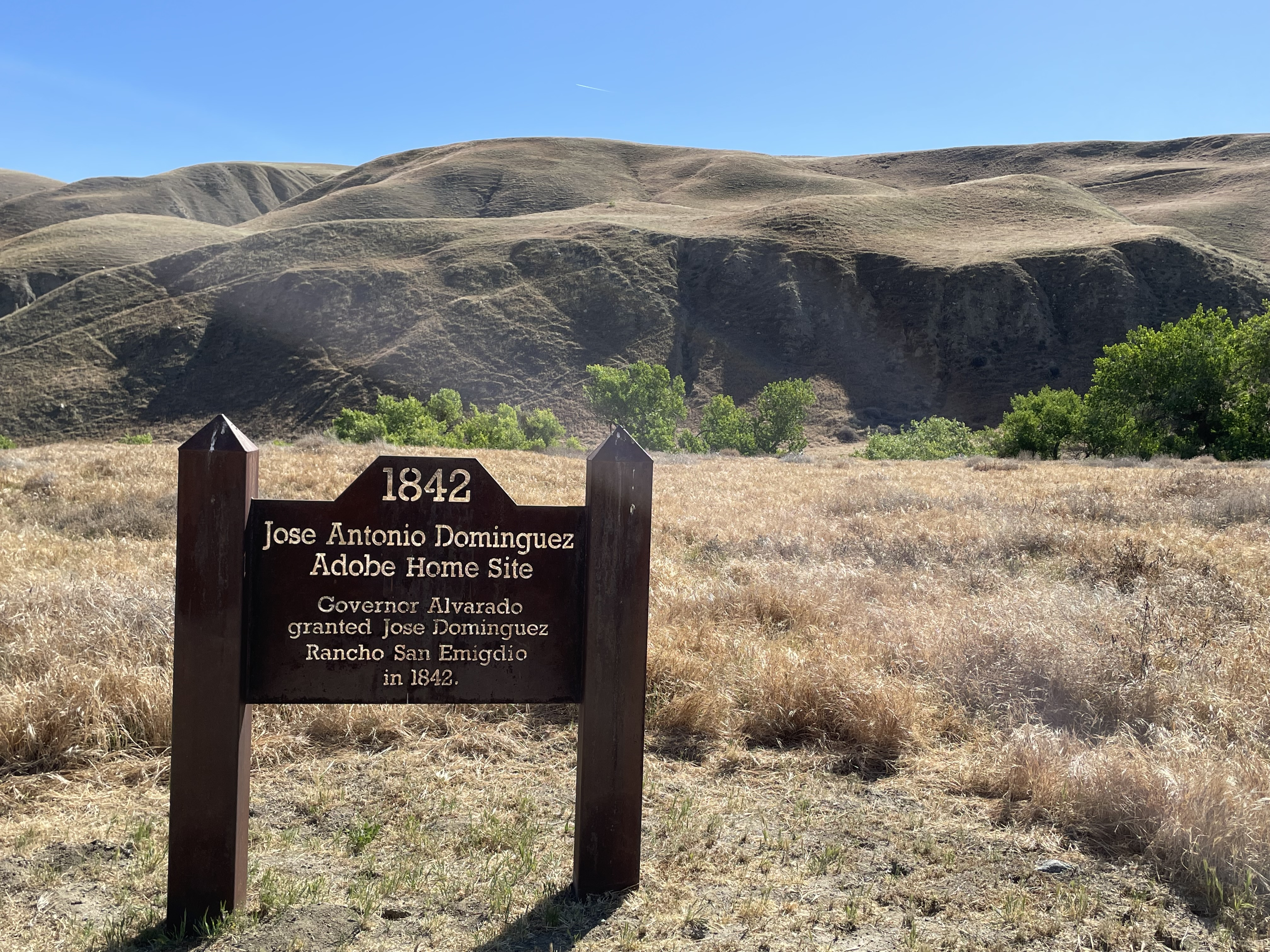
San Emidio Historic Marker

Chumash, Yokuts, and Kitanemuk peoples lived in the area. In the 1820s, El Camino Viejo, the original inland route between San Francisco and Los Angeles, passed through the region. In 1842, the land was included in the Mexican land grant of Rancho San Emidio, later associated with figures such as John C. Frémont. From the mid-19th century through the 1990s, the property was operated as a cattle ranch.

In 1996, The Wildlands Conservancy acquired the property and opened it to the public as Wind Wolves Preserve. The name "Wind Wolves" refers to the visual effect of tall grasses bending and parting in gusts of wind, resembling unseen animals running across the slopes. Livestock grazing continues on some portions of the preserve as part of land management practices.

The 2011 Knob Fire, ignited by lightning in the Pleito Hills, killed an estimated 11% of the local population of the endangered Bakersfield cactus. Restoration efforts included propagation of cactus pads and establishment of new populations on the preserve.

In 2021, a conservation easement was placed on 14,631 acres (5,921 ha) of the preserve, monitored by the California Rangeland Trust. The easement formalized ongoing seasonal cattle grazing on these lands, with 3,500 head of cattle.

== Recreation ==
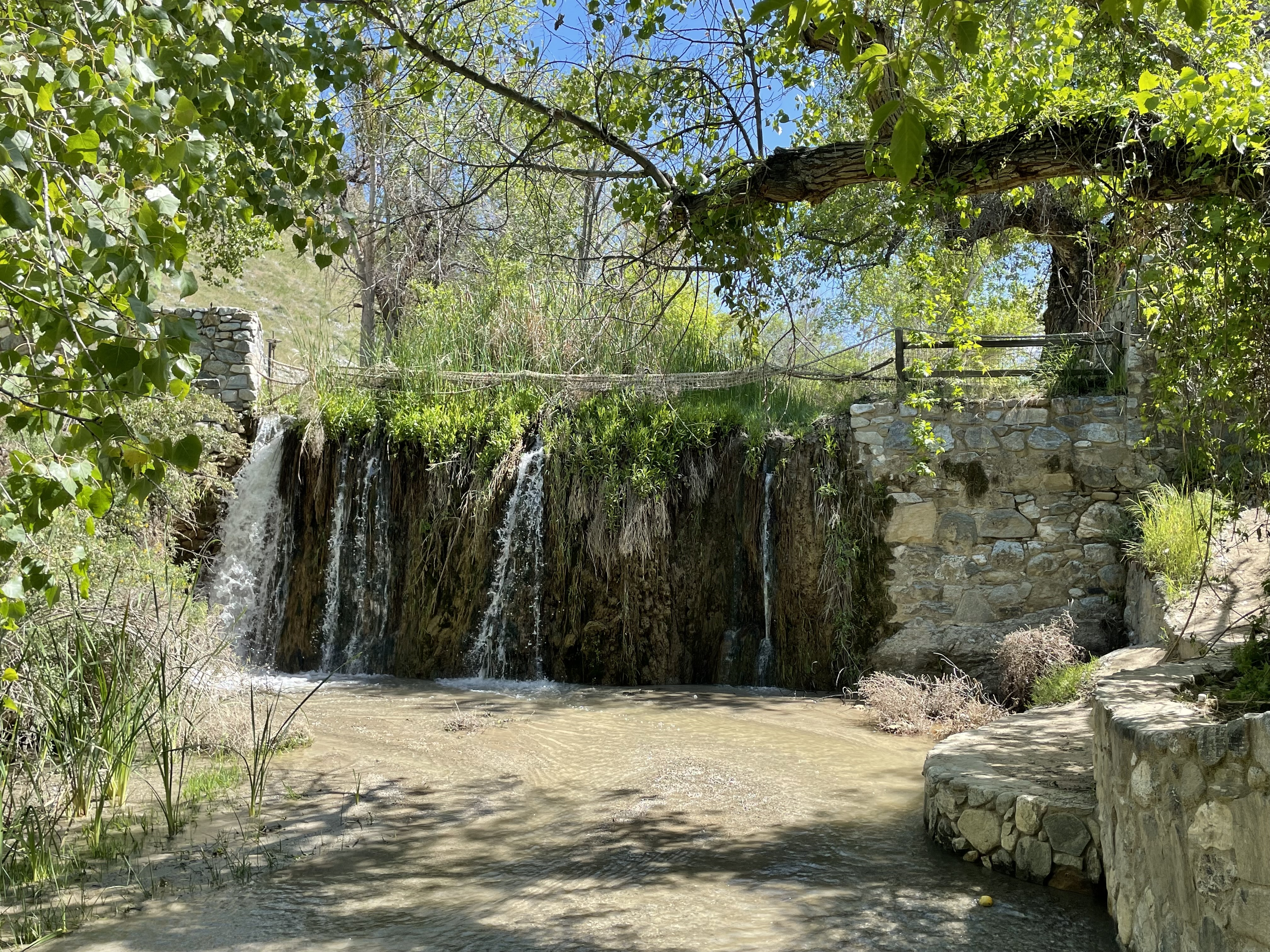
Waterfall

The Wildflower Loop and Redtail Trail are short loop trails. The San Emigdio Canyon Trail follows a creek and provides some shade. Raven's Landing and the Tule Elk Overlook provide views of San Emigdio Canyon and toward the Los Padres Mountains. The Reflection Pond Trail leads to a dry pond area with exposed sandstone.

Visitor facilities include campgrounds, picnic areas, gazebos, stone restrooms, and ponds. A small waterfall is located nearby the main trailhead.

== Education and programs ==
The preserve offers outdoor education programs. Since 1996, more than 157,000 students in Kern County, California have participated.

Programs serve K–12 students and include topics such as Native American lifeways, ecology, wetland ecosystems, and geology.

The Science Sleuths program provides nature-based activities for children ages 10 and up.

== Events ==
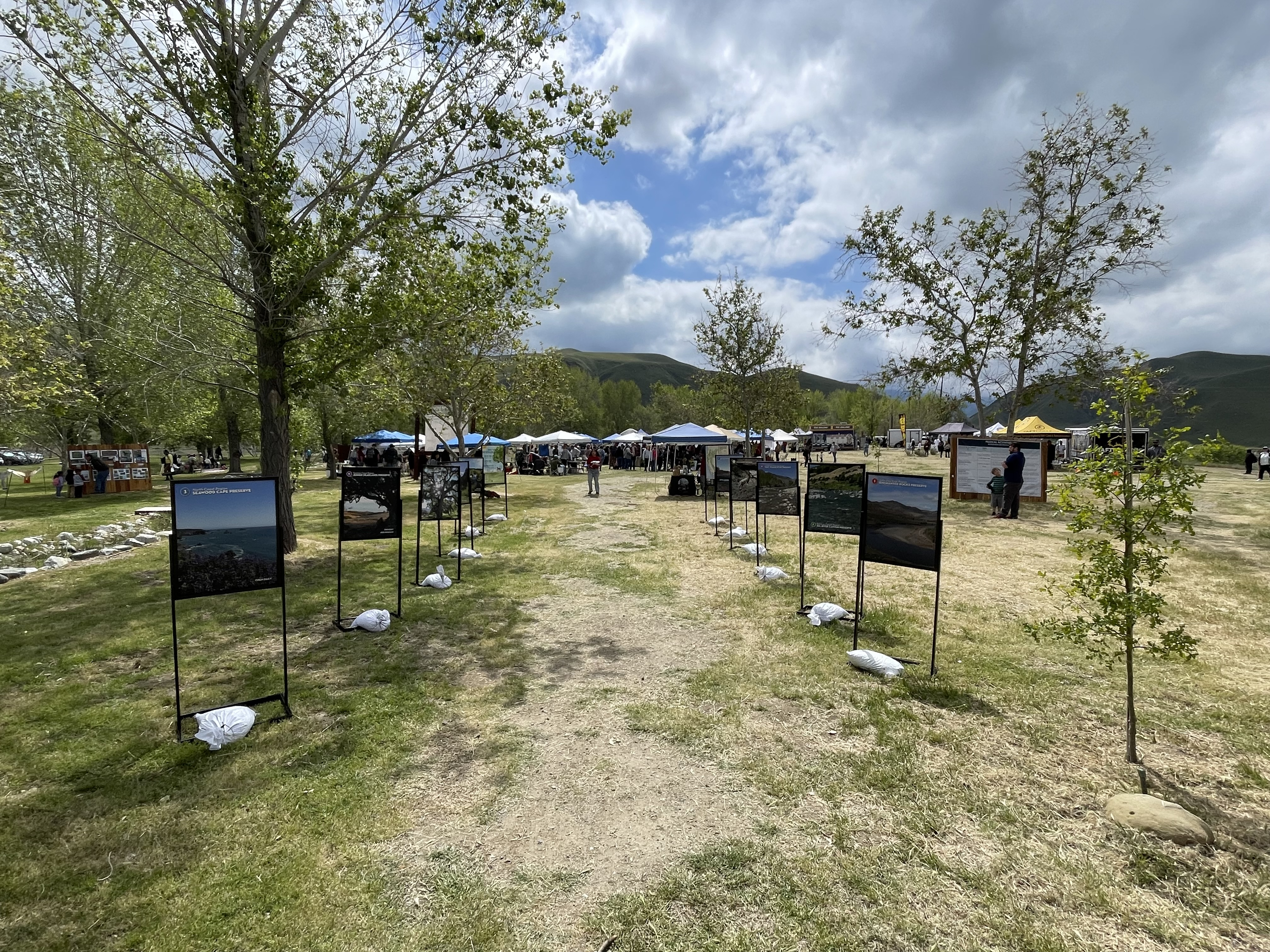
Spring Nature Festival displays

The Spring Nature Festival is a two-day annual event featuring guided hikes, wildlife presentations, educational booths hosted by regional organizations, and wildflower viewing.

The preserve also hosts a variety of seasonal programs and community events, including family programs, educational workshops, and volunteer activities.

== Works ==
- "Carmel Valley's Newest Preserve and Kern County's Tule Elk". OpenRoad. Episode 92. April 7, 2024. NBC Bay Area.

== See also ==
- List of The Wildlands Conservancy preserves
- Bitter Creek National Wildlife Refuge
