= Shoals (disambiguation) =

Shoals are a coastal landform.

Shoals may also refer to:

== Places ==
- Shoals, Indiana
- Shoals, North Carolina
- Shoals, West Virginia
- Shoals Township, Surry County, North Carolina
- The Shoals, the Florence–Muscle Shoals metropolitan area in Alabama

== Other ==
- Shoals (album), a 2022 album by Palace
- Shoals (horse)
- Shoals High School, a high school in Martin County, Indiana
- Shoals Marine Laboratory, a marine field station in Maine

== See also ==
- Bay of Shoals
- Bull Shoals (disambiguation)
- Isles of Shoals
- Shoal (disambiguation)
- Muscle Shoals (disambiguation)
- Mussel Shoals (disambiguation)
