= Greka Energy =

Privately held company engaged in hydrocarbon exploration

HVI Cat Canyon Inc.
- Type: Privately held company
- Industry: Petroleum industry Mining
- Founded: 1999; 27 years ago (Saba; Horizontal Ventures)
- Headquarters: Santa Maria, California, U.S.
- Area served: Central California
- Key people: Randeep Grewal, Owner and CEO; Andrew DeVegvar, President
- Products: Petroleum; Asphalt; Emulsion
- Number of employees: 200
- Website: www.greka.com

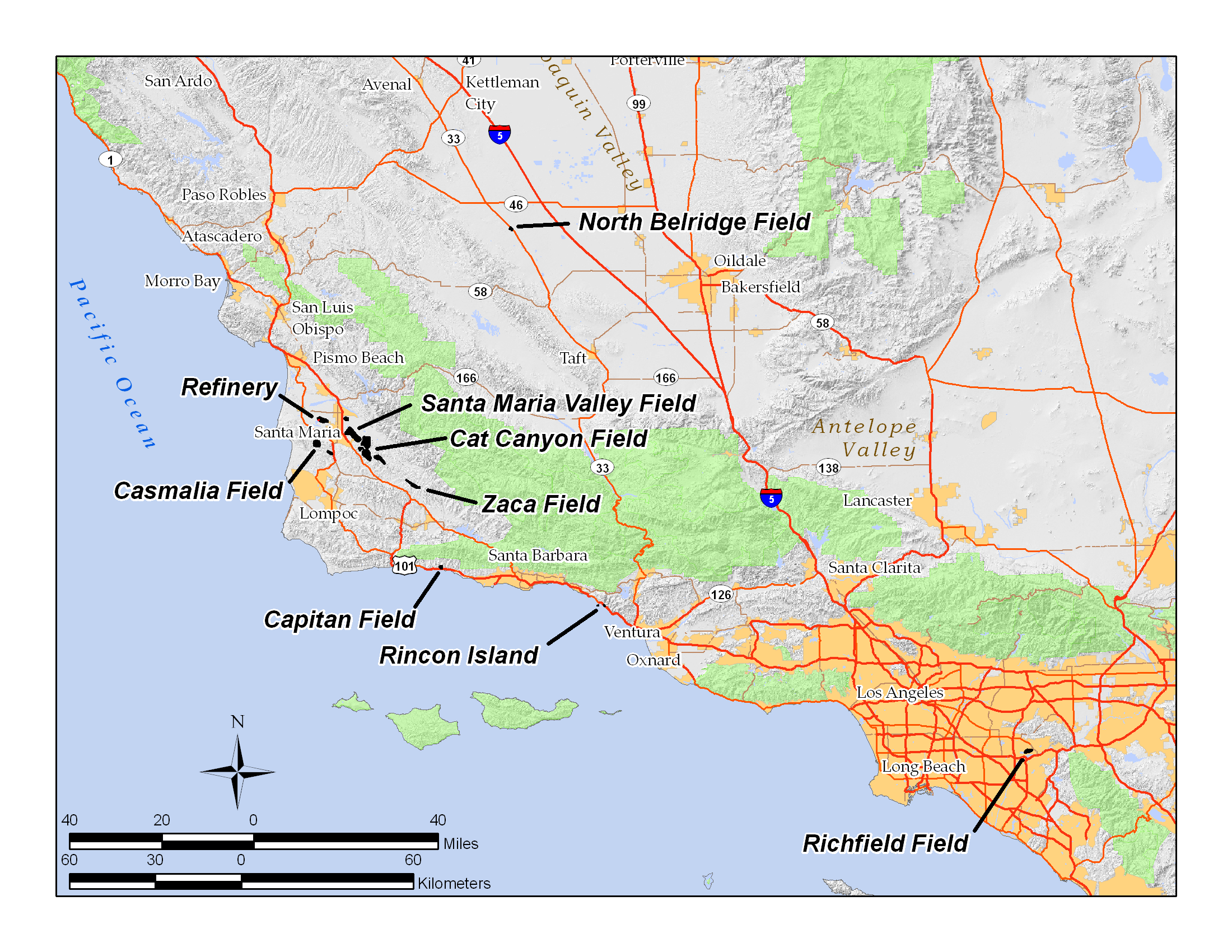
Location of Greka facilities in California, as of 2009.

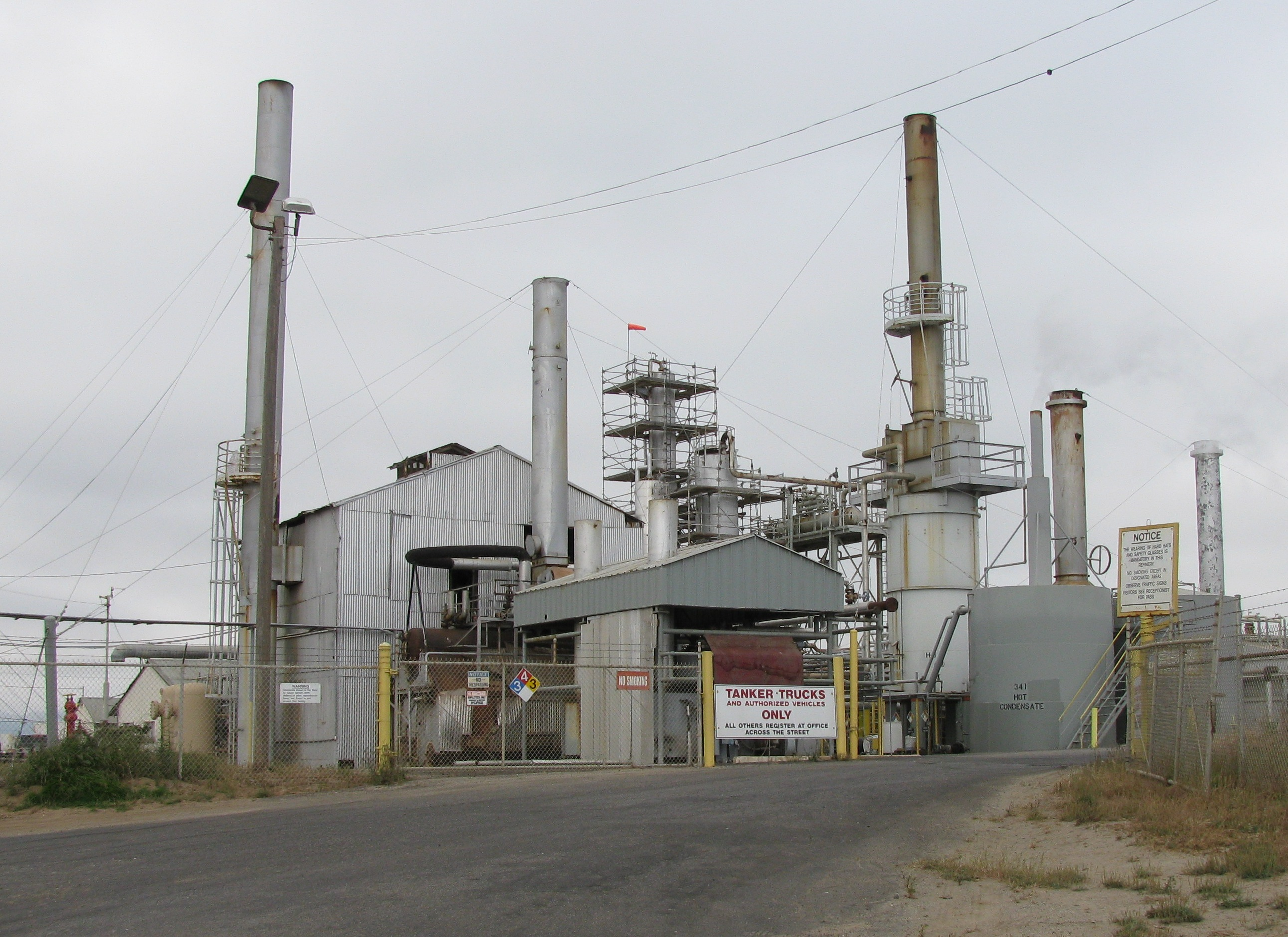
Main entrance to Greka Refinery, Santa Maria, California

Greka Energy, legally HVI Cat Canyon Inc., is a privately held company engaged in hydrocarbon exploration principally in Santa Barbara County, California. Formed in 1999 after the acquisition and merger of several smaller firms, it is a subsidiary of Greka Integrated, Inc., a holding company headquartered in Santa Maria, California, and is wholly owned by Randeep Grewal.

In May 2011, the company changed its name from Greka Oil & Gas Inc. to HVI Cat Canyon Inc.

In June 2019, the company filed bankruptcy after federal and state authorities, including the United States Environmental Protection Agency (EPA) and the United States Department of Justice (DOJ), fined the company for oil spills.

Greka focuses on petroleum extraction and asphalt processing in California, with holdings in Santa Barbara, Ventura, Kern, and Orange Counties. It is the largest onshore oil operator in Santa Barbara County.

In 2008, after several oil spills, the company was referred to by state and federal officials as "California's number one inland oil polluter".

== China-based affiliate ==
When Greka was still a publicly traded company, in 2002 and early 2003, the China operations were part of the firm; Grewal separated them out later as Green Dragon Gas, a public company (GDG on the London Stock Exchange), which is also majority owned and controlled by Grewal. Green Dragon Gas was incorporated in 2006 in Hong Kong, and mainly extracts coal bed methane in China.

== History ==
Greka was originally named Kiwi III, Ltd, and was created as a Colorado corporation in 1988. This firm, renamed to Petro Union, Inc., filed for bankruptcy in 1996.

In 1998, with his newly purchased Horizontal Ventures, which was then a private entity, Randeep Grewal acquired the assets of Petro Union, which was just then emerging from its 1996 bankruptcy filing in Indiana. In 1999, Randeep Grewal acquired the assets of Saba Petroleum, which was founded in 1981, changing the company's name to Greka. Grewal formed Greka Energy by combining these entities in 1999.

In an October 2000 interview with The Wall Street Transcript, Randeep Grewal stated that the company's motto was "Working for Profits".

Greka acquired Windsor Energy US Corporation and Rincon Island Limited Partnership in 2002, thereby adding assets in Rincon Island in Ventura County. Also in 2002, it acquired the properties of Vintage Petroleum in northern Santa Barbara County, which included about 110 producing wells on portions of five oil fields, principally in the Santa Maria Valley and the surrounding hills.

As of 1999, Greka had holdings in Canada, Colombia, Indonesia, and China, in addition to oil fields and other facilities in California, Texas, New Mexico and Louisiana.

In 2003, Randeep Grewal acquired all outstanding shares of the company for $6.25 per share or $32 million.

In November 2005, Saba Enterprises filed bankruptcy. Neither the producing operations – which included several leases in Santa Barbara County, Rincon Island, Orange County, and Kern County – nor the asphalt plant were included in the liquidation filing.

Greka appointed former Greka CFO, Andrew deVegvar as president in January 2008.

DeVegvar began a "Greka Green" campaign to counter the perception that the company was environmentally careless. The company also hired corporate security consultant, Tom Parker, a former Sr. FBI agent and Deputy Chief of the Los Angeles Regional Office of the FBI, in order to investigate alleged sabotage at its facilities in late 2007 and early 2008 seemingly timed to coincide with the political meetings regarding Greka.

On August 20, 2008, Greka settled a lawsuit brought from the trustees of the owners of the mineral rights to several leases on the Cat Canyon Field. Greka paid $5 million to the trustees through Wells Fargo and Union Bank. At issue was the transfer in 2002 of production from Vintage Petroleum, the original operator hired in 1992, to Greka, which allegedly took place without the trustee's permission. According to Greka, the operations on the three leases on the field were only a small part of its local operations.

Due to the decline in oil prices during the Great Recession, Greka laid off 30 people in March 2009, representing about 20% of its staff in the Santa Maria area.

Greka changed its name to HVI Cat Canyon, Inc. in May 2011, going back to a name it had used prior to 1999 for its operations on the East Cat Canyon Oil Field. The name "HVI Cat Canyon Inc." had been the name of a small subsidiary of Horizontal Ventures, Inc. prior to its 1998 merger with Saba Petroleum Corporation. The entity which resulted from this merger was named "Greka Energy", a name which it retained until 2011.

=== Asphalt refinery ===
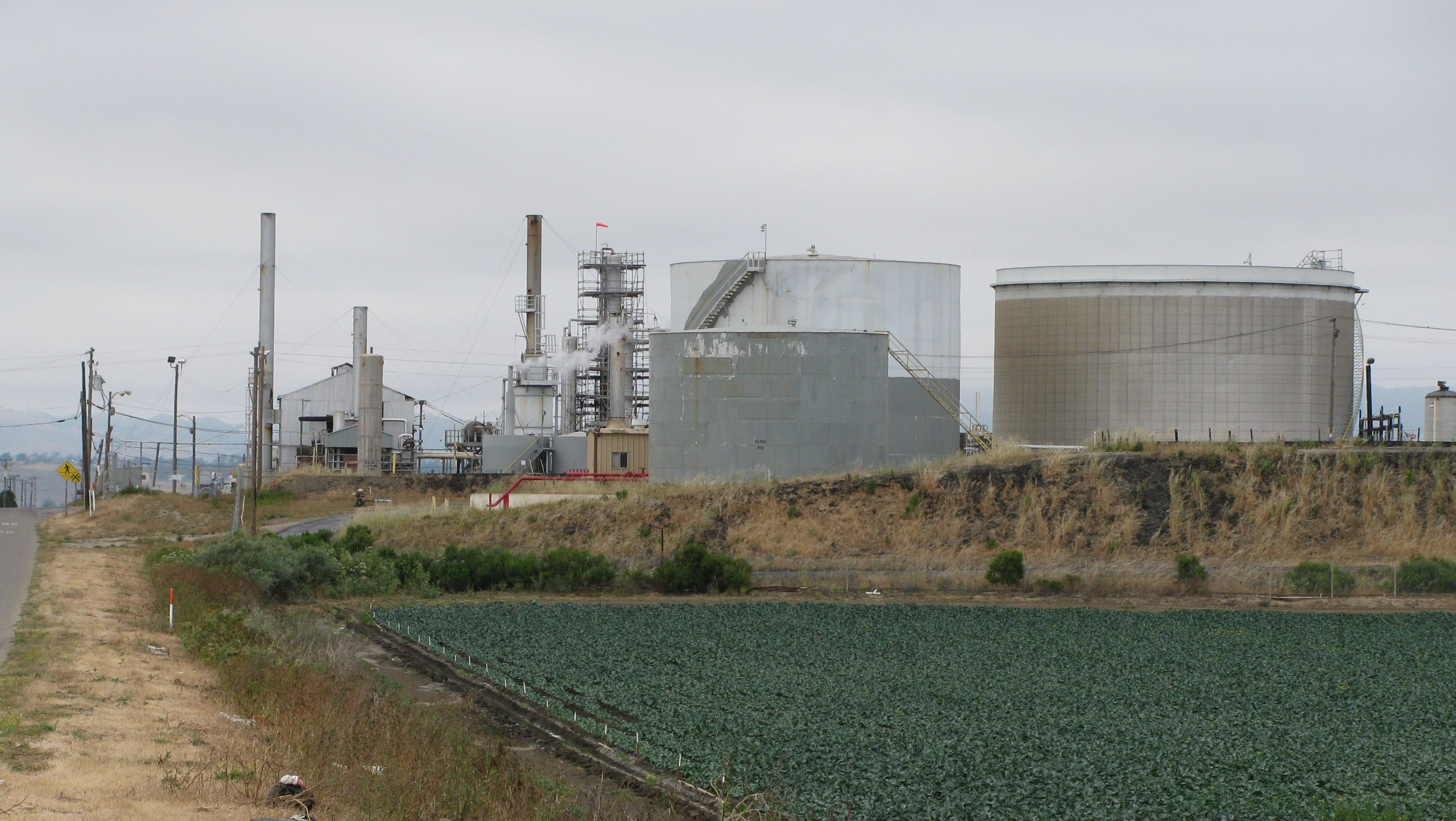
Greka Asphalt Refinery on Sinton Road, Santa Maria, adjacent to agricultural fields

Greka owns and operates an asphalt refinery northwest of Santa Maria. It sits on 30 acres (120,000 m^{2}) of land surrounded by an agricultural area, but within the still-operational portion of the Santa Maria Valley oil field. Greka's heavy oil operations in North Belridge and elsewhere provide feedstock to the refinery, especially when the price of oil is low. The refinery is able to separate heavy oil into distillates and heavy fractions at approximately 125 barrels (19.9 m^{3}) per hour; the company then ships the resulting product out by truck. Products of the refinery, in addition to asphalt, include naphtha, asphalt emulsion, and gas oil. Some of the distillates are used by regional oil fields as a diluent, aiding in oil recovery.

The refinery was constructed in 1935, prior to the creation of zoning laws in the county, which accounts for its unusual position as an isolated industrial parcel within a mostly agricultural area. Previous owners of the refinery included Conoco and Saba. Saba took over the refinery in 1994, closing it while it performed equipment upgrades, and reopening it in 1996. In 1999, Greka acquired the refinery along with Saba's other assets as part of its acquisition of Saba. In the early 2000s the facility was subject to numerous safety audits and facility upgrades, completed in 2004. In 2005, Greka shut the plant down temporarily in a planned 10-year turnaround to upgrade the equipment further, and in November of that year received a permit to process wastewater, which is now used to irrigate surrounding cropland.

The asphalt plant functioned as a hedge. When oil prices were high, the company was able to sell on the open market the heavy crude produced from the Cat Canyon, Santa Maria Valley, and North Belridge fields; when the price of oil was low, the company used it instead to make asphalt at its Santa Maria refinery, since asphalt keeps a relatively constant price. In 2002, Greka announced that it had approximately 800 million barrels (130,000,000 m^{3}) of heavy crude oil recoverable with current technologies. Greka was able to capture this resource since the heavy oil existed in a shallower, neglected reservoir, primarily the contained in the Sisquoc Formation. When the major oil companies – Union, Conoco, Shell, and others – extracted oil in the Santa Maria Valley from the 1920s to the 1980s, the company mainly pumped from the deeper formations with lighter oil which was more valuable; when the company pulled out of the county in the 1980s and 1990s, it left behind considerable reserves of difficult-to-extract heavy oil, which however made good feedstock for the asphalt refinery.

=== Onshore oil production ===
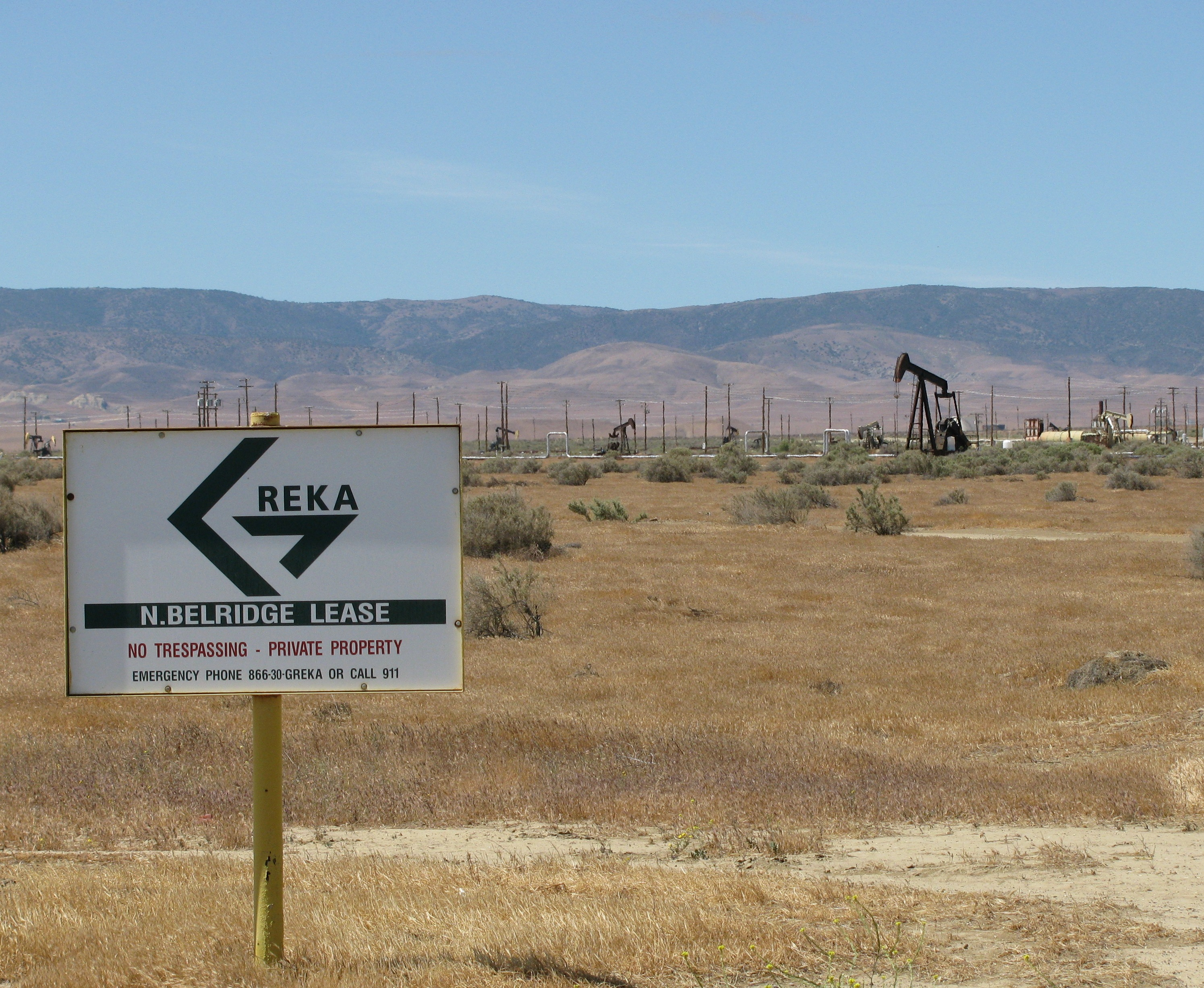
Greka lease on the North Belridge Oil Field; oil wells and steam injection apparatus are visible in the distance.

As of the beginning of 2009, Greka ran onshore oil production facilities in four California counties: Santa Barbara, Kern, Ventura, and Orange. In Santa Barbara county, the company actively produced oil from the Santa Maria Valley, Casmalia, Zaca, and Cat Canyon fields. Greka operates wells at the North Belridge Oil Field in Kern County, the Casmalia Oil Field, Cat Canyon Oil Field, Zaca Oil Field, and Santa Maria Valley Oil Field in Santa Barbara County, and the Richfield Oil Field in Orange County.

=== Rincon Island former operations ===
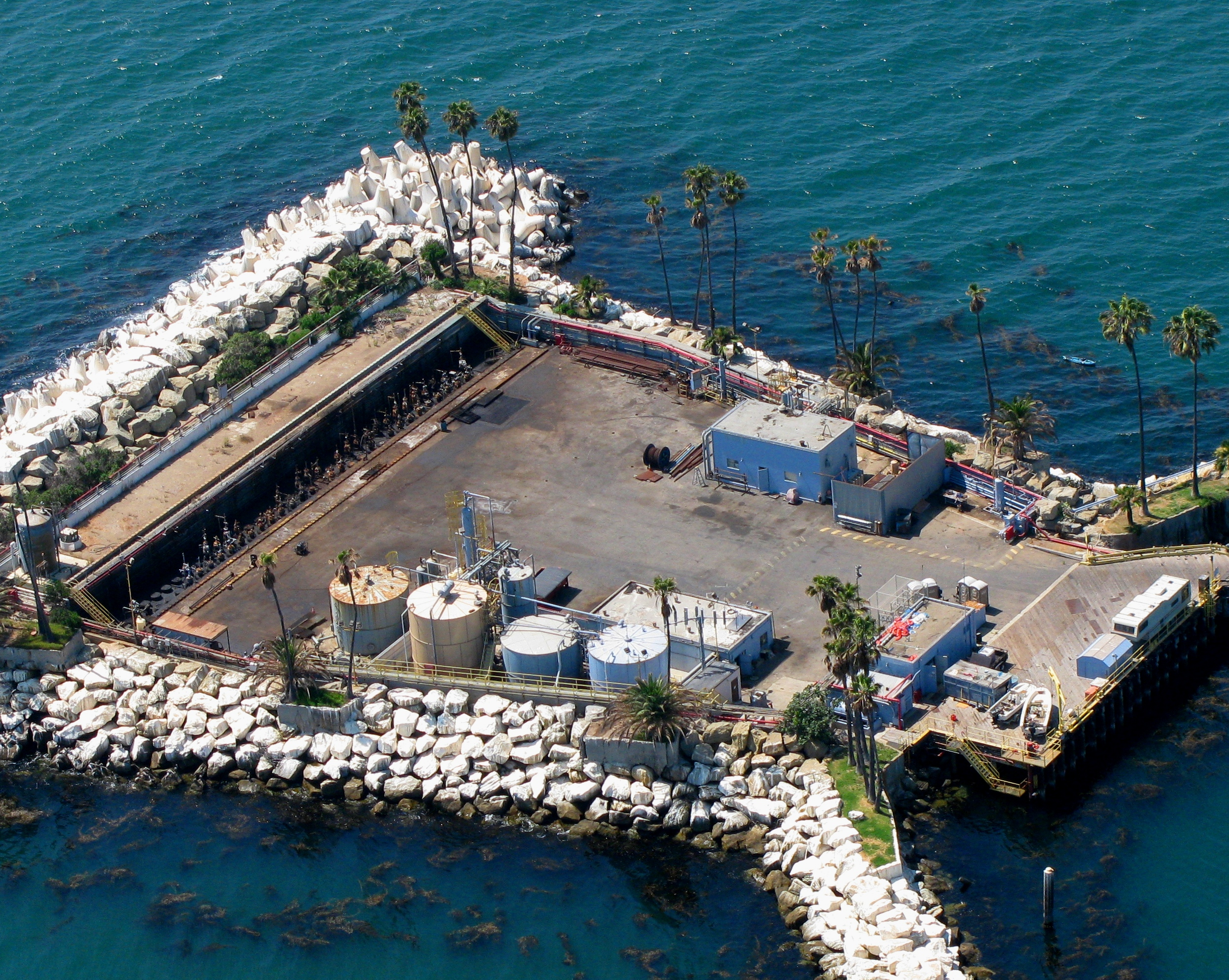
Central area of operations on Rincon Island

Rincon Island, California, is a small artificial island about a mile offshore from Punta Gorda in Ventura County. It is in state waters in the eastern portion of State PRC Lease 1466 in the Rincon Oil Field. Greka acquired it in 2002 with the purchase of Rincon Island Ltd. Partnership; the island itself dates from 1958.

Also in early January 2008, Greka through Rincon Partnership voluntarily shut down the causeway leading to the Rincon Island facility so that it could repair damage to the pilings caused by the El Nino storms. Consequently, production from the Rincon Island was suspended (as no other method of moving oil to shore was available). Rincon Partnership has promised to repair the causeway.

At the beginning of 2009, there were 20 active oil wells within the approximately 1.5-acre (6,100 m^{2}) area enclosed by the berm. Rincon Island Limited Partnership, the subsidiary of the company that held the assets in Rincon Island, filed bankruptcy in 2016 to block California from forcing the company to perform extensive remediation on its wells amid environmental concerns. In December 2017, the bankruptcy trustee gave ownership of the property to the state via quitclaim deed.

== Oil spills and environmental compliance issues ==
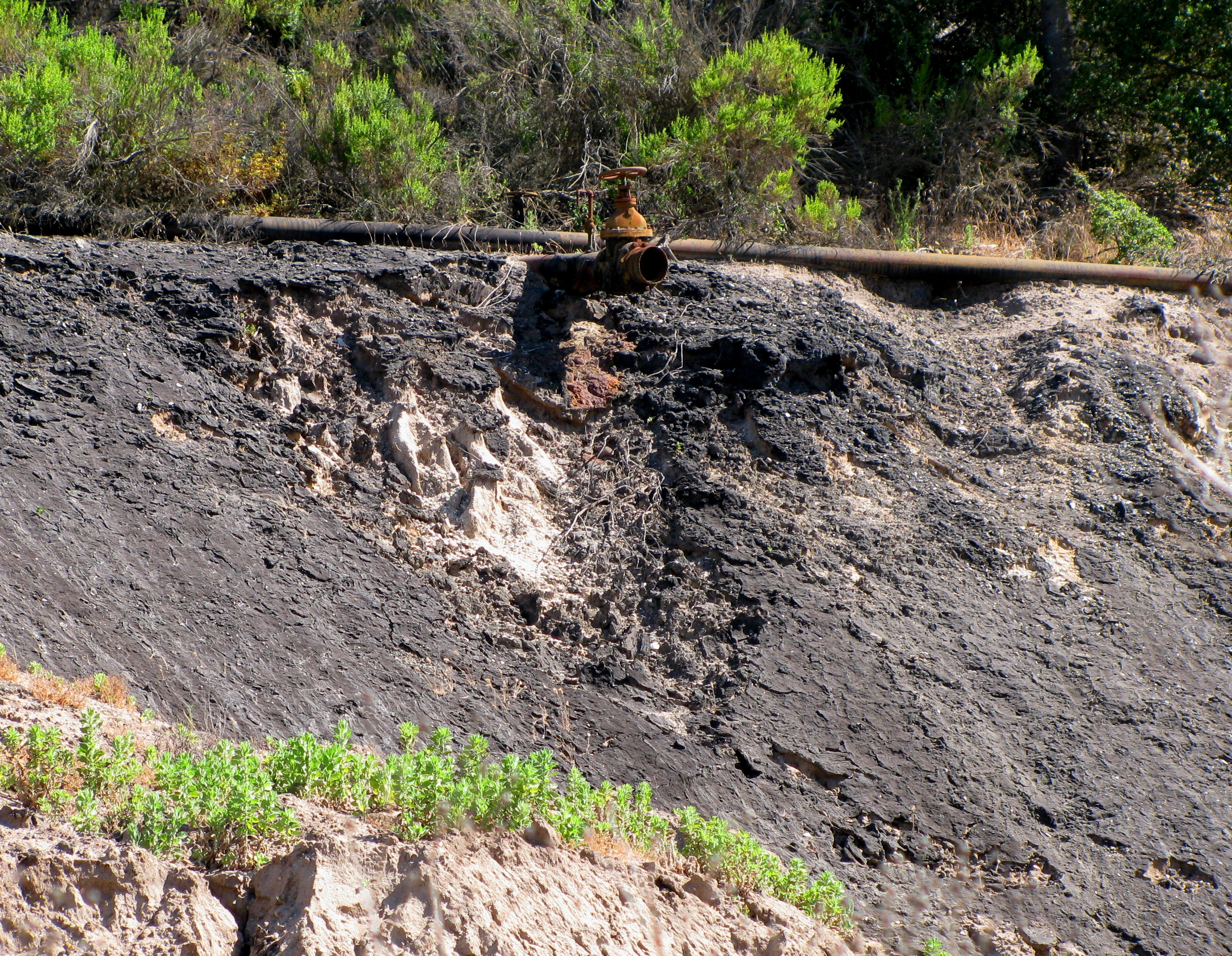
Oil spill on a hillside on the Bell Lease, Cat Canyon Field, showing pipeline.

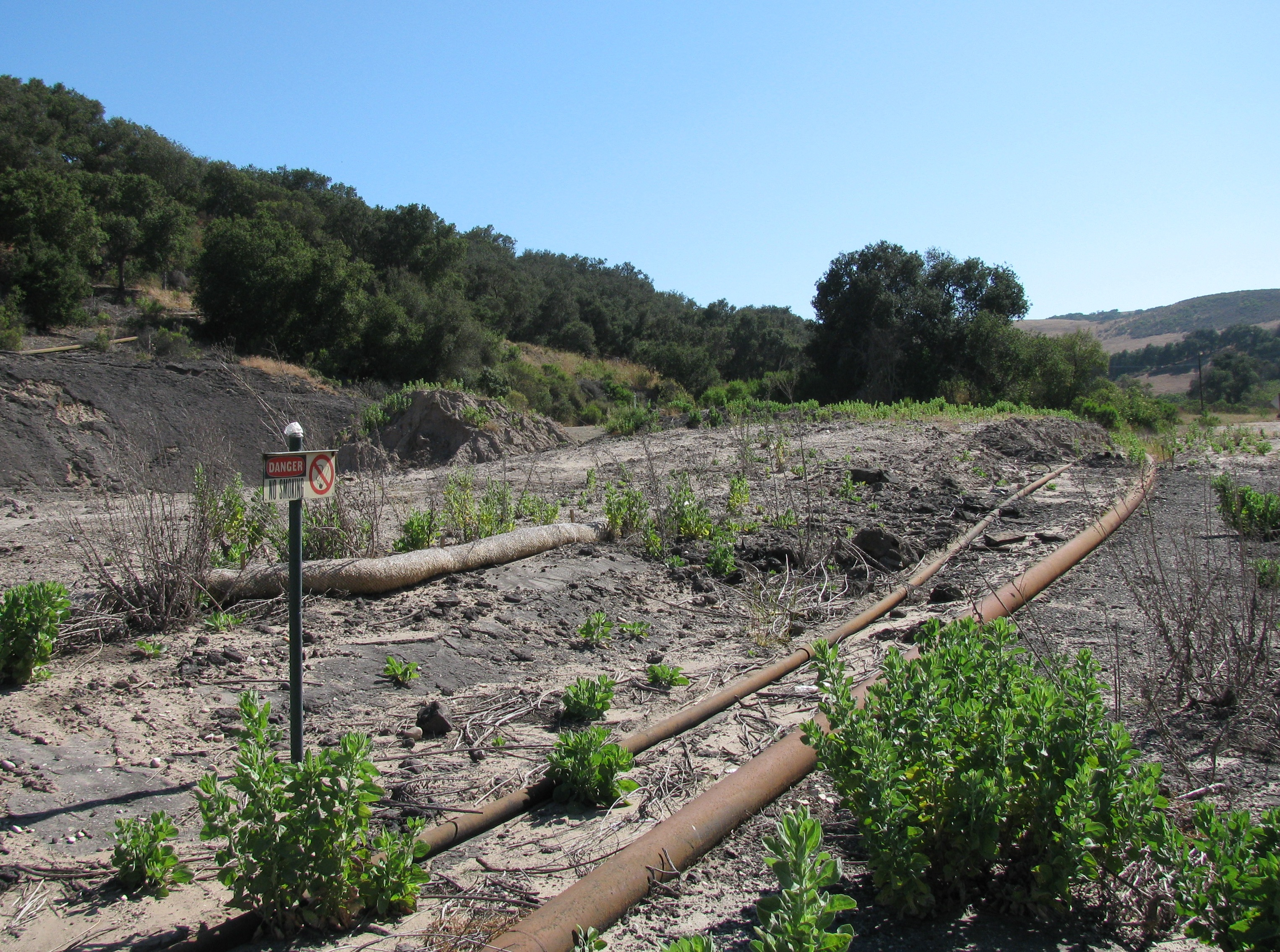
Partially cleaned oil spill along Palmer Road, near Santa Maria, California. The asphaltic material throughout the photograph is weathered crude oil; a containment boom is visible at left center, and two pipelines run along the right of the picture.

In 1999, Greka began operations in Santa Barbara County by acquiring the aging infrastructure left behind by companies that were pulling out of the county to pursue better opportunities. In 2009, only Chevron Corporation was left of the major companies; Aera Energy LLC, a joint venture of Shell and Mobil, also retained some operations at the Cat Canyon Oil Field.

Between 1999 and 2008, the Santa Barbara County Fire Department responded to over 400 waste leaks and spills at Greka. According to EPA Superfund Division employee Robert Wise, speaking to the Associated Press, "I've been in the hazardous materials business for 20 years and this is the worst oil company I've ever seen." Fines, legal action, and EPA investigations have all resulted from the numerous releases at Greka facilities. In 2008, a Fish and Game official called Greka the worst inland oil polluter in California.

On June 1, 2006, The EPA fined Greka $127,500 for improperly disposing of industrial wastewater by injecting it into disposal wells on its Union Sugar and Morganti Leases in the Santa Maria Field, not far from its refinery. While some water disposal is permitted in wells – indeed, wastewater is often used to recharge oil reservoirs to improve recovery – industrial wastewater is considered to be a greater danger to drinking water and must be treated differently, and can only be injected into wells meeting specific criteria. Injecting such water into Class II wells is a violation of the federal Safe Drinking Water Act of 1974.

In June 2007, the company was fined $1 million for violating the Safe Drinking Water Act. The EPA and the DOJ determined that Santa Maria Refining Company disposed of contaminated wastewater into wells that were not permitted for that use, posing a risk to groundwater supplies. The company was also sentenced for making false statements to the EPA.

On December 7, 2007, Greka spilled over 58,000 US gallons (220 m^{3}) of oil at its Bell Lease in the East Cat Canyon Oil Field along Palmer Road southwest of Santa Maria. Greka's attorney, however, claimed that some of the recent spills were the work of an eco-terrorist at large. Pipes and wires were cut, valves were opened, and alarms disabled. Some of the wires had been cut with a crimping device. Attorney Robert O'Brien also emphasized that Greka is meticulous in its reporting of the exact amount spilled, unlike other operators in the county.

A spill occurred on January 5, 2008 at the Zaca-Davis tank battery in the Zaca Oil Field, along Zaca Station Road. Approximately 8,400 US gallons (32 m^{3}) of oil and produced water overflowed the containment area – escaping the large secondary containment through an open 12-inch (300 mm) drainage pipe – and contaminated about one mile (1.6 km) of Zaca Creek. Greka claimed that this spill was also the result of sabotage.

On January 15, 2008, the Santa Barbara County Board of Supervisors held a hearing and 25 Greka employees attended. Greka had spilled approximately 500,000 US gallons (1,900 m^{3}) of liquids in the county – both oil and produced water, a total of about 12,000 barrels (1,900 m^{3}) – in the four years from 2003, when the company went private, to the end of 2007, while it also had the largest number of active wells.

In 2008, Greka launched the "Greka Green" initiative, intending to establish itself as an environmental leader in the Santa Barbara County petroleum industry. As part of this initiative, it would repair or remove much of the decaying infrastructure which had been responsible for many of the leaks, spills, and releases that had brought the company to the attention of regulators and the public.

The EPA removed Greka's contractor from the cleanup effort in February 2008, stating that Greka and its contractors were inefficient and incompetent, and repeatedly "failed to meet federal standards." In particular, the EPA found that Greka employees were covering spilled oil in the creek with fresh soil, rather than removing it; therefore EPA removed them from the cleanup exercise. Greka dismissed its cleanup contractor in March, and the contractor the company hired to replace them failed the EPA's Hazardous Waste Operations and Emergency Response Standards (HAZWOPER), so EPA dismissed them, and carried out the cleanup themselves. On the same day that the EPA dismissed Greka from its own cleanup, February 1, Congresswoman Lois Capps wrote in a letter to the EPA: "Given the apparent haphazard manner in which the Greka sites are managed and the devastating effects this mismanagement is having on the local environment, it is crucial that EPA continue working with appropriate federal, state, and local agencies to put an end to this intolerable situation." Greka countered that the EPA's action had effectively prevented the company from finishing its own cleanup efficiently and on time.

In October 2008, EPA took over the cleanup of a Greka spill for the third time, this one at the Gato Lease in the Cat Canyon Oil Field and stated that it would seek to have Greka reimburse its expenses.

In February 2008, Assembly Bill 1960 was introduced in the state legislature, largely in response to spills at Greka. It was approved in September 2008.

On January 21, 2009, Greka sued Santa Barbara County, California, alleging that it used its "repeat offenders" rule to shut down non-polluting facilities along with polluting ones, a situation Greka maintained was unconstitutional. The County agreed with Greka that the retroactive application of the rule would be unconstitutional. The remaining claims were dismissed by a U.S. District Court.

On July 10, 2009, the California Regional Water Quality Control Board, at a meeting in Watsonville, California, recommended Greka be referred to the Attorney General of California for prosecution due to its repeated waste spills. In 2008 alone, Greka had spilled more than 157,000 US gallons (590 m^{3}) of waste (oil and produced water); Greka had spilled more than a 500,000 US gallons (1,900 m^{3}) since going private in 2003, resulting in over 400 hazardous materials teams responses; the firm had been fined more than $2.6 million by the different regulatory agencies during this time.

In March 2011, Greka agreed to pay $2 million between 2011 and 2014 as compensation for the series of spills which occurred in late 2007 and early 2008, events which included more than 1,700 violations. Additionally, Greka promised to improve its infrastructure to make future spills less likely, including reinforcing containment structures.

On June 17, 2011, the DOJ, California Department of Fish and Wildlife, and California Regional Water Quality Control Board filed suit against Greka in Federal court in Los Angeles for having failed to comply with the requirements of the Clean Water Act, citing 21 oil and contaminated water spills between 2005 and 2010. The amount sought was in excess of $2.4 million.

In Santa Barbara County, from 2015 through 2017, there 161 notices of violation of which, 145 were directed toward Greka, which also received 35 of the 36 fines that were levied.

In May 2018, the company was fined $12.5 million for 1,500 operating violations at an oil field located in Orange County. It was the highest fine ever levied in the history of the California Department of Conservation.

In December 2018, EPA officials served search warrants at Greka facilities on Sinton Road. In February 2019, the EPA ordered the company to conduct sampling to determine whether its operations resulted in contaminated local soil and groundwater.

In August 2019, the company had a leak from a tank at its asphalt refinery on Sinton Road.

In November 2019, up to 10 barrels of oil leaked from a facility of the company on Black Road in Santa Barbara County.

== Public relations ==
In Santa Barbara County, the company has occasionally hired retired County Supervisor Mike Stoker as a spokesman. In 2018, Stoker went to work for the EPA. In 2008, the company hired Tony Knight from the public relations firm Sitrick and Company.
