= Shoal (disambiguation) =

A shoal is a sandbank or reef creating shallow water, especially where it forms a hazard to shipping.

Shoal, shoals or shoaling may also refer to:

== Locations ==
- The Shoals, a region in northwest Alabama, United States
- Shoals, Indiana, a town in the United States

== Science ==
- Wave shoaling, the change of wave height for sea waves propagating into shallow water
- Shoaling and schooling, ways that fish and other aquatic animals behave when in large groups

== Other ==
- Project Shoal, an underground nuclear test
- Project Shoal (software), a java based scalable dynamic clustering framework.
- Shoal draught (or draft), of a boat with shallow draught which can pass over some shoals: see Draft (hull)

== See also ==
- Shoals (disambiguation)
- Shoal Creek (disambiguation)
