= International joint venture =

Type of business

An international joint venture (IJV) occurs when two businesses based in two or more countries form a partnership. A company that wants to explore international trade without taking on the full responsibilities of cross-border business transactions has the option of forming a joint venture with a foreign partner. International investors entering into a joint venture minimize the risk that comes with an outright acquisition of a business. In international business development, performing due diligence on the foreign country and the partner limits the risks involved in such a business transaction.

IJVs aid companies to form strategic alliances, which allow them to gain competitive advantage through access to a partner's resources, including markets, technologies, capital and people. International joint ventures are viewed as a practical vehicle for knowledge transfer, such as technology transfer, from multinational expertise to local companies, and such knowledge transfer can contribute to the performance improvement of local companies. Within IJVs one or more of the parties is located where the operations of the IJV take place and also involve a local and foreign company.

== Basic elements ==
These include:

- Contractual Agreement - IJVs are established by express contracts that consist of one or more agreements involving two or more individuals or organizations and that are entered into for a specific business purpose.
- Specific Limited Purpose and Duration - IJVs are formed for a specific business objective and can have a limited life span or be long-term. IJVs are frequently established for a limited duration because (a) the complementary activities involve a limited amount of assets; (b) the complementary assets have only a limited service life; and/or (c) the complementary production activities will be of only limited efficacy.
- Joint Property Interest - Each IJV participant contributes property, cash, or other properties and organizational capital for the pursuit of a common and specific business purpose. Thus, an IJV is not merely a contractual relationship, but rather the contributions are made to a newly formed business enterprise, usually a corporation, limited liability company, or partnership. As such, the participants acquire a joint property interest in the assets and subject matter of the IJV.
- Common Financial and Intangible Goals and Objectives - The IJV participants share a common expectation regarding the nature and amount of the expected financial and intangible goals and objectives of the IJV. The goals and objectives of an IJV tend to be narrowly focused, recognizing that the assets deployed by each participant represent only a portion of the overall resource base.
- Shared Profits, Losses, Management, and Control - The IJV participants share in the specific and identifiable financial and intangible profits and losses, as well as in certain elements of the management and control of the IJV.

== Reasons for forming ==
There are many motivations that lead to the formation of a JV (joint venture). They include:

- Risk sharing – Risk sharing is a common reason to form a JV, particularly, in highly capital intensive industries and in industries where the high costs of product development equal a high likelihood of failure of any particular product.
- Economies of scale – If an industry has high fixed costs, a JV with a larger company can provide the economies of scale necessary to compete globally and can be an effective way by which two companies can pool resources and achieve critical mass.
- Market access – For companies that lack a basic understanding of customers and the relationship / infrastructure to distribute their products to customers, forming a JV with the right partner can provide instant access to established, efficient and effective distribution channels and receptive customer bases. This is important to a company because creating new distribution channels and identifying new customer bases can be extremely difficult, time-consuming and expensive activities.
- Geographical reason – When there is an attractive business opportunity in a foreign market, partnering with a local company is attractive to a foreign company because penetrating a foreign market can be difficult both because of a lack of experience in such market and local barriers to foreign-owned or foreign-controlled companies.
- Funding constraints – When a company is confronted with high up-front development costs, finding the right JV can provide necessary financing and credibility with third parties.
- Acquisition – When a company wants to acquire another but cannot due to cost, size, or geographical restrictions or legal barriers, teaming up with a company in a JV is an attractive option. The JV is substantially less costly and thus less risky than complete acquisitions, and is sometimes used as a first step to a complete acquisition with the JV. Such an arrangement allows the purchaser the flexibility to cut its losses if the investment proves less fruitful than anticipated or to acquire the remainder of the company under certain circumstances.

== Due diligence ==
Before entering an international joint venture, businesses are advised by business advisers to do a thorough due diligence on the country, the business, and the partner. Due diligence is the investigation of a country, business or person, for the purpose of obtaining useful information on the potential benefits, pitfalls and costs. It helps investors to make better profit and mitigate risk. It includes thorough research about the potential partners through channels like internet, database and media search, establishing each partner's duties and responsibilities, management control, agreeing on splits of returns, exit strategies, contingency plans, etc. International law firms working with businesses who are considering a joint venture will use a due diligence checklist to ensure that it is a sound business development.

== Advantages ==
Many of the benefits associated with international joint ventures are that they provide companies with the opportunity to obtain new capacity and expertise and they allow companies to enter into related business or new geographic markets or obtain new technological knowledge. Furthermore, international joint ventures in most cases have a short life span, allowing companies to make short-term commitments rather than long-term commitments. Through international joint ventures, companies are given opportunities to increase profit margins, accelerate their revenue growth, produce new products, expand to new domestic markets, gain financial support, and share scientists or other professionals that have unique skills that will benefit the companies.

== Structure ==
International joint ventures are developed when two companies work together to meet a specific goal. For example, Company A and Company B first begin by identifying and selecting an IJV partner. This process involves several steps such as market research, partner search, evaluating options, negotiations, business valuation, business planning, and due diligence. These steps are taken on by each company. There are also legal procedures involved such as IJV agreement, ancillary agreements, and regulatory approvals. Once this process is complete, the IJV Company is formed and during this final procedure the steps taken are formation and management.

Structuring IJVs can pose a challenge when parties are from two different cultural backgrounds or jurisdictions Once both parties have come to an agreement on fundamental issues such as commercial nature, scope and mutual objectives of the joint venture, the parties must decide on where, geographically, the venture will take place and what the legal structure for the venture will look like. Most of the time, the structure agreed on will be between different types of corporations, partnerships, or some form of a limited liability company.

=== Limited liability ===
Limited liability allows to limit debts and losses to the assets of the venture and protect the assets of the members themselves from being liable for the venture's debts.

In a limited liability partnership (LLP), the partners have limited liability and can be held liable only to the extent of their capital investments. In the U.S., in addition to limited liability partners, the law requires that every limited partnership have at least one general partner who has unlimited liability. The general partner can be held responsible for all the liabilities of the limited partnership. Many ventures resolve this problem by forming a special purpose entity, usually a limited liability company or a corporation, which then acts as the general partner.

A joint venture formed as limited liability company (LLC) offers protection to the partners by providing limited liability to all of its members. Unlike a limited liability partnership (LLP), there is no requirement to have a general partner who has unlimited liability and can be held responsible for all the liabilities.

Both limited partnerships and limited companies in the U.S. enjoy the advantage of being pass-through entities for U.S. tax purposes. The limited partnership does not pay taxes. Instead, the tax liability of the venture is allocated to the members of the LLP in proportion to their interests in the venture.

== Management ==
There are two types of international joint ventures: dominant parent and shared management. Within dominant parent IJVs, all projects are managed by one parent who decides on all the functional managers for the venture. The board of directors, which is made up of executives from each parent, also plays a key role in managing the venture by making all the operating and strategic decisions. A dominant parent enterprise is beneficial where an international joint venture parent is selected for reasons outside of managerial input.

On the other hand, shared management ventures consist of both parents managing the enterprise. Each parent organizes functional managers and executives that will be within the board of directors. In this form of management, there are also two types of shared management ventures. The first type is 50:50 IJV and this is where each partner puts in 50% of the equity in return for 50% participating control. The second type is where both partners can negotiate that not all shared management ventures are 50:50 and that one partner has more than a co-equal role in the IJV.

== Finance ==
When two or more partners get together and form an international joint venture agreement, they must decide early on in regards to what the financial structure will entail as this will aid in management and control. Some of the steps include establishing the capital required to start the IJV, the impact of securing a strong strategic alliance partner, and financial reporting. Once an arrangement is made, a tax-planned joint venture will be created which will aid in maximizing the after-tax returns.

== Factors affecting International Joint Ventures ==
=== Economic factors ===
formation and planning

Problems that arise in joint ventures are usually as a result of poor planning or the parties involved being too hasty to set up shop. For example, a marketing strategy may fail if a product was inappropriate for the joint venture or if the parties involved failed to appropriately assess the factors involved. Parties must pay attention to several analyses both of the environment and customers they hope to operate in. Failure to do this sets off a bad tone for the venture, creating future problems.

financial performance

One of the fastest ways for a joint venture is to fail is financial disputes between parties. This usually happens when the financial performance is poorer than expected either due to poor sales, cost overruns or others. Poor financial performance could also be as a result of poor planning by the parties before setting up a joint venture, failure to approach the market with sufficient management efficiency and unanticipated changes in the market situation. A good solution to this is to evaluate financial situations thoroughly before and during every step of the joint venture.

Manager Another issue that can affect the success of joint ventures is the ineffective blending of managers who are not used to working together or have entirely different ways of approaching issues affecting the organization. Many joint ventures come apart due to misunderstanding over leadership strategies. For a successful joint venture, there has to be understanding and compromise between parties, respect and integration of the strengths of both sides to overcome the weaker points and make their alliance stronger.

management structure In a bid to have equal rights in the venture, there could be a misfit of managers. As a result, there is a major slowdown of decision making processes. Daily operational decisions that are best made quickly for more efficiency of the business tends to be slowed down because there is now a ‘committee’ that is in place to make sure both parties support every little decision. This could distract from the bigger picture leading to major problems in the long run.

=== Economic environment of IJV ===
The goal of a JV partnership is more customers and a stronger body. To ensure a JV's partnerships are profitable, it helps to look at them from the customer's point of view. The features a JV partnership should aim to acquire for a marketing campaign are channeling the expertise and strengths of both parties to maximize value for the customers and stakeholders, while downplaying the weaknesses and presenting a united front.

=== Cultures of IJV ===
When a joint venture is formed, it is an attempt at blending two or more cultures in the hope of leveraging on the strength of each party. Lack of understanding of the cultures of the individual parties poses a problem if not addressed. A common problem in these multi-cultural enterprises is that the culture is not considered in their initial formation. It is usually assumed that the cultural issues will be addressed later when the new unit has been created. Usually, compromises are reached and certain cultural from the parties are kept on while others are others are either out right discarded or modified.

== Potential disputes and agreements when entering IJV's ==
When two or more partners agree on an international joint venture, there are possibilities for disputes to arise. Particularly in IJVs, there can be issues between the partners who are likely to want their home country's governing law and jurisdiction to apply to any disputes that may come up; therefore, to avoid such a problem, a neutral governing law and jurisdiction is chosen in some cases. A popular dispute resolution technique used in IJVs is arbitration; however, many times a court process is given priority as this system has more authority. Other dispute resolution strategies utilized are mediation and litigation. Entering into an international joint venture agreement begins with the selection of partners and then generally this process continues to a Memorandum of Understanding or a Letter of Intent is signed by both parties. The Memorandum of Understanding is a document describing an agreement between parties. On the other hand, a Letter of Intent is a document outlining an agreement between the parties before the agreement is finalized. Before signing an IJV, specific aspects of the agreement must be addressed such as applicable law, holding shares, transfer of shares, board of directors, dividend policy, funding, access, confidentiality and termination.

== IJV in different countries ==
=== China ===
An IJV is an attractive way to get into Chinese market for businesses that are unfamiliar with the completed culture and the less open market. However, China is becoming more and more global and familiar to the world. As such, IJV is falling out of practice because of the practical difficulties in picking a proper partner, management, technology transfer, profit sharing and so on.

There are two main types of IJV in China: Equity Joint Ventures and Cooperative Joint Ventures.

==== Equity joint ventures (EJVs) ====
An equity joint venture is a partnership between an overseas and a Chinese individual, enterprises or financial organizations approved by the Chinese government. Companies in an equity joint venture share both mutual rewards, risks and losses according to the ratio of investment.

A minimum of 25% the capital must be contributed by the foreign partners, and no minimum investment for the Chinese partners.

A joint venture is free to hire Chinese nationals without the interference from government employment industries by abiding Chinese Labor Law, and purchase land, build their own buildings, and privileges prevented to representative offices.

==== Cooperative joint ventures (CJVs) ====
CJVs are a rather unevenly regulated form of IJV between Chinese and foreign-based companies. They are usually found in venture, which are both technology-based and have a substantial requirement for fixed assets, for example infrastructure and volume manufacturing.

No minimum foreign contribution is required to initiate cooperative ventures, and the contributions made by the investors are not necessarily expressed in a monetary value. These contributions can include excluded in the equity joint venture process can be contributed such as labor, resources, and services.

Greater flexibility in the structuring of a cooperative venture is also permissible including the structure of the organization, management, and assets.

=== Turkey ===
International joint ventures have played a significant role in the reform and liberalization of the laws governing foreign investors as part of Turkey's economic program adopted after 2001. Turkey lies on the borders between Europe and Asia and is used as a way to achieve strategic goals to enter into the Asian or European market, which is important for those wanting to enter EU market since Turkey signed the European Customs Union (ECU). The Turkish Accounting Standards Board requires that all enterprises established under the Turkish Commercial Code in Turkey must prepare statutory financial statements in compliance with the Turkish Accounting Standards Board, which makes all accounting data transparent and more reliable for all parties involved. Under Turkish Law, a joint venture may be formed under two ‘umbrellas’: Commercial Company, governed by the Turkish Commercial Code or Ordinary Company, Governed by the Turkish Code of Obligations.

== Examples of successful IJVs ==
=== Aera Energy ===
Aera Energy covers a large area of California. The state's leading oil and gas producer (accounting for 30% of California's total production), Aera Energy's properties extend from the Los Angeles Basin in the south to Coalinga in the north. It has daily production of 165,000 barrels of oil and 50 million cubic feet of natural gas and boasts proved onshore and offshore reserves of 800 million barrels of oil equivalent. Aera Energy also has interests in real estate operations (in partnership with homebuilder Toll Brothers). The exploration and production company is a joint venture of affiliates of ExxonMobil and Shell.

=== Omega Navigation Enterprises Inc. ===
Omega Navigation Enterprises Inc. is an international provider of marine transportation services focusing on seaborne transportation of refined petroleum products. One of the vessels, namely the Omega Duke, is owned through a 50% controlled joint venture with Topley Corporation, a wholly owned subsidiary of Glencore. They have also formed an equal partnership joint venture company with Topley Corporation, namely Megacore Shipping Ltd.

=== Japan Nuclear Fuel Co., Ltd. (JNF) ===
Japan Nuclear Fuel Co., Ltd. (JNF), the predecessor of Global Nuclear Fuel – Japan Co., Ltd. (GNF-J), started operation in Kurihama in 1967 as a nuclear fuel manufacturing joint venture among General Electric (US), Toshiba and Hitachi. Since it began supplying the first domestically produced nuclear fuel in 1971, GNF-J, a pioneer nuclear fuel manufacturer, has delivered more than 70,000 fuel bundles to various nuclear power plants across the country and contributed to the stable supply of energy in Japan. On January 1, 2000, the sales, design and development operations were transferred from the three joint venture partners to JNF, and JNF made a new start as a GE group company, later changing its name to GNF-J, by offering core management services as well as handling MOX fuel design and quality control.
