= Zaca =

Zaca may refer to:

- Huehue Zaca, a 15th-century Aztec noble and a warrior
- The Zaca Fire, the second largest wildfire in modern California history
- Zaca Creek, an American country music group
- Zaca Creek, a tributary of the Santa Ynez River
- Zaca Oil Field, along Zaca Creek
- Two U.S. Navy ships named USS Zaca
