= North Belridge Oil Field =

Oil field along in Kern County, California, USA

Coordinates: 35.5452°N 119.7942°W

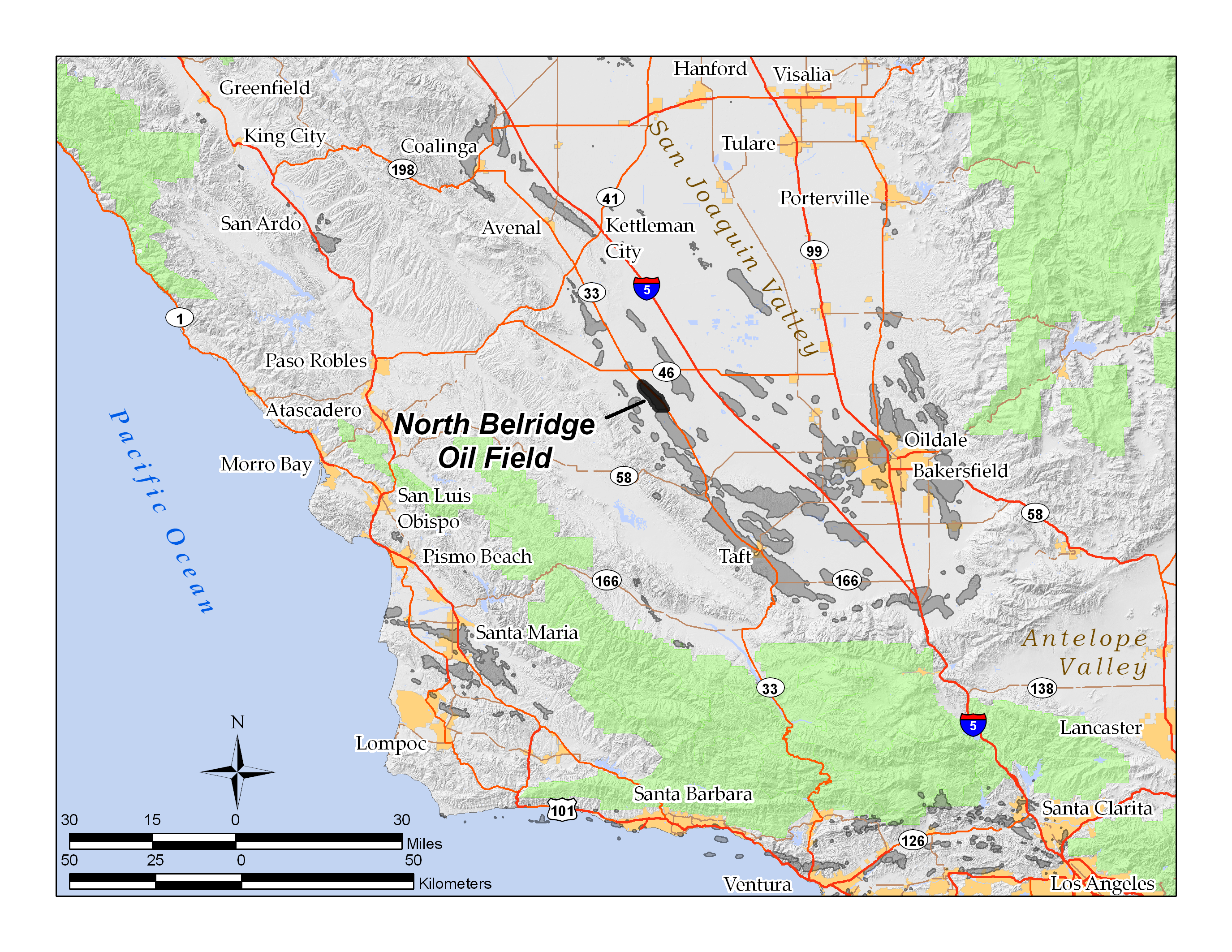
The North Belridge Oil Field in Kern County, California. Other oil fields are shown in gray.

The North Belridge Oil Field is a large oil field along California State Route 33 in the northwestern portion of Kern County, California, about 45 miles west of Bakersfield. It is contiguous with the larger South Belridge Oil Field to the southeast, in a region of highly productive and mature fields. Discovered in 1912, it has had a cumulative production of 136,553,000 barrels (21,710,200 m^{3}) of oil, and retains 27,443,000 barrels (4,363,100 m^{3}) in reserve, as of the end of 2006, making it the 40th largest oil field in the state.

== Setting ==
The oil field is located along the west side of State Route 33, beginning about four miles south of its junction with State Route 46. It is about 5 miles (8.0 km) long by 1 mile (1.6 km) across, paralleling the highway on the southwest. The low Antelope Hills run adjacent to the field on the southwest, and the entire area slopes gently down to the northeast, towards the San Joaquin Valley; agricultural fields and orchards begin on the other side of Highway 33 from the field. Elevations on the field range from about 600 to 700 feet (180 to 210 m) above sea level, while the floor of the valley to the northeast is around 250 feet (76 m). The main production area of the field is almost completely flat.

The North Belridge Oil Field is part of the larger Belridge Producing Complex of Aera Energy LLC, which includes also the much larger oil fields of South Belridge, Lost Hills, and Cymric, all in northwestern Kern County. Other nearby oil fields include the small Antelope Hills and McDonald Anticline fields several miles to the southwest, and the large Lost Hills Oil Field to the northeast, adjacent to the town of Lost Hills.

The climate in the North Belridge area is arid to semi-arid, with an average annual rainfall of 5 to 6 inches (130 to 150 mm), almost all in the winter months. Temperatures in the summer routinely top 100 °F (38 °C); occasional freezes occur in the winter. Native vegetation in the vicinity of the field is mostly grassland and sparse scrub, although most of the vegetation has been removed from the area of most active operations, with the land in these central areas now almost completely barren except for oil rigs, drilling pads, and associated equipment.

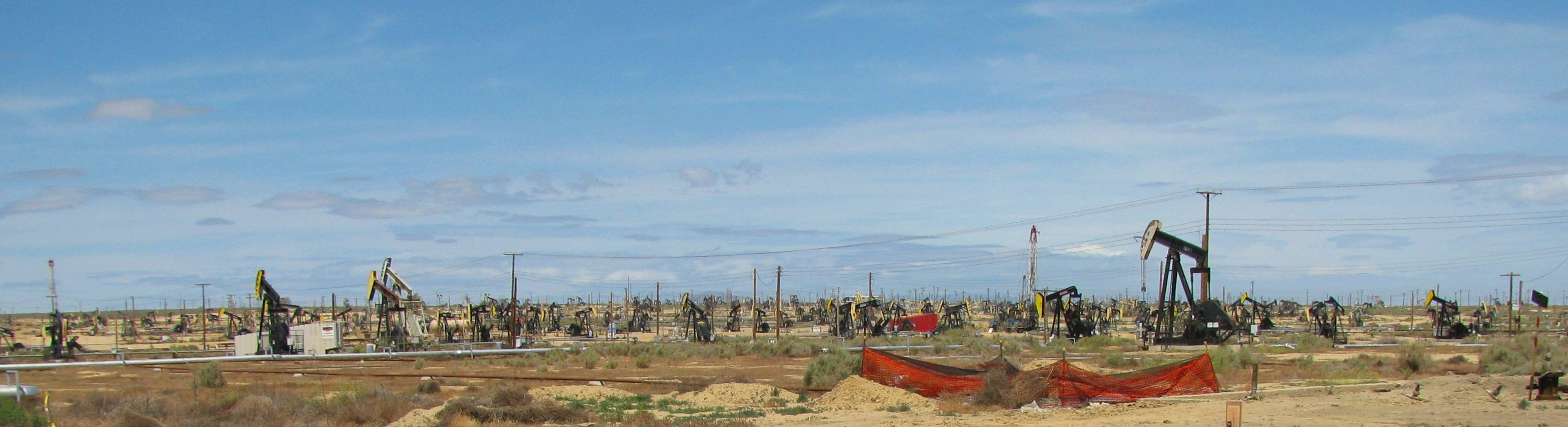
Wells on the North Belridge Field, stretching to the horizon.

== Geology ==
The North Belridge Field, like the South Belridge and the others nearby (Cymric, Monument Junction, McKittrick, Antelope Hills, and others) is near the western margin of the huge San Joaquin Basin, a region of extensive sedimentary rocks of varying porosity and permeability, containing anticlinal folds and copious quantities of petroleum, much of which has been extracted in the early and middle 20th century. The San Andreas Fault, the boundary of the Pacific and North American plates, borders the basin on the west; it is about 10 miles (16 km) from the North Belridge Field, on the other side of the Temblor Range.

In the North Belridge Field, most oil is trapped in anticlinal formations. There are eight separate pools within the field. The following list gives them in order by depth from top to bottom, along with the year of discovery for each:

- Tulare-Etchegoin (1917)
- Diatomite (1978)
- Fractured Shale (1912)
- Temblor Sand (1930)
- Carneros (1966)
- R Sand (1939)
- Bloemer/Belridge 64/Gibson (1932)
- Y Sand (1942)

The age range of the pools and their corresponding geologic formations is from Pliocene-Miocene for the uppermost members, to Eocene for the oceanic Y Sand, which is at a depth of over 8,500 feet (2,600 m). The fourth pool – the Temblor Sand – is within the Monterey Formation, the wide-ranging unit throughout much of coastal California which is the probable source rock for much of the state's oil. The Oligocene portions of the stratigraphy, including the Bloemer/Belridge 64/Gibson pools, are an old submarine fan, cut off from its source units by movement of the plates along the San Andreas Fault.

Oil viscosity and quality from the field is widely variable. Greka's lease produces mostly heavy oil, with an API of around 13 and a high sulfur content, which it uses either as feedstock for its asphalt refinery in Santa Maria (when the price of oil is low) or sells on the open market (when the price is high). Some of the pools produce light oil with an API as high as 52, for example the "R Sand", at which production peaked in 1951.

== History, production, and operations ==
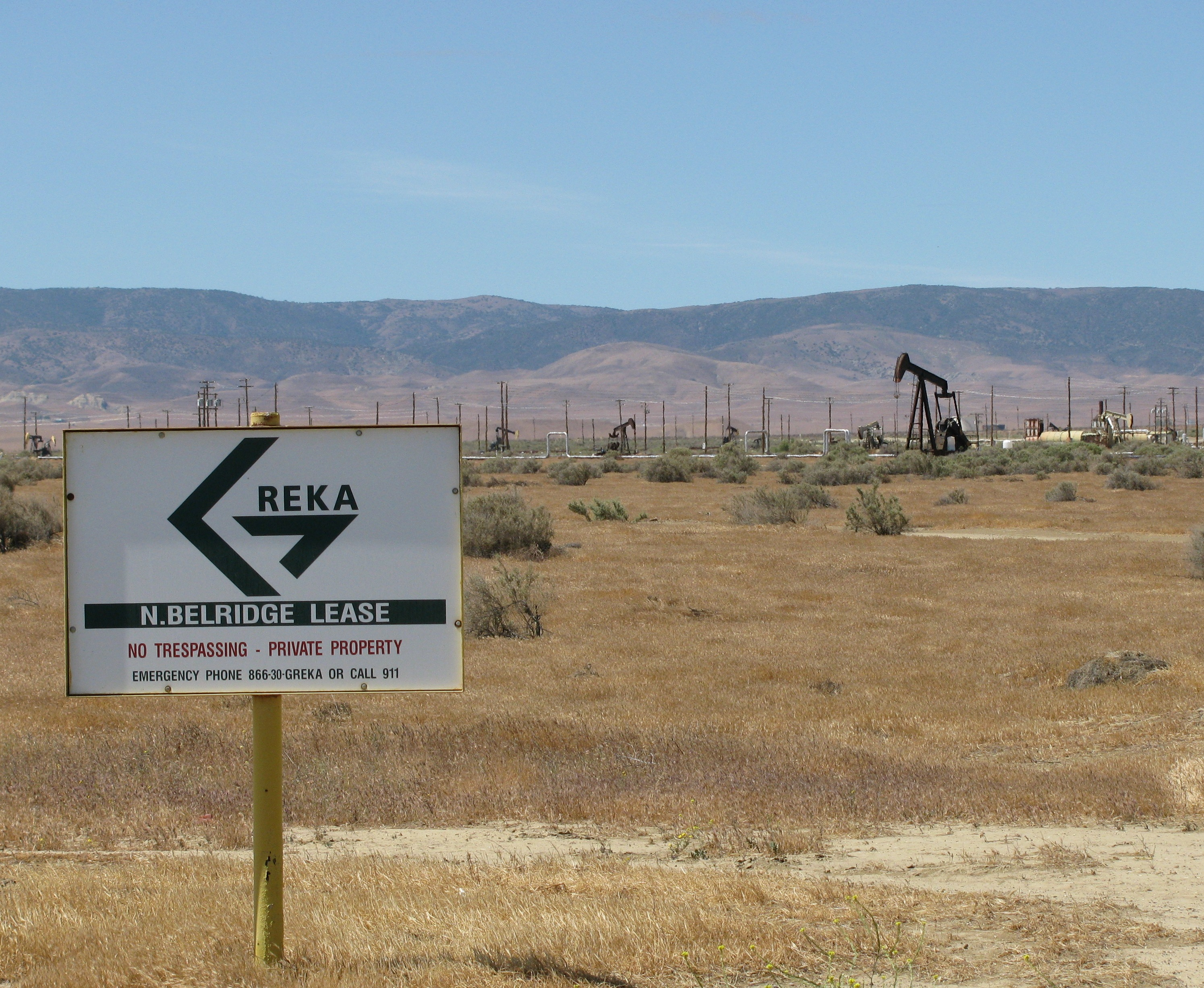
View into the Greka operations on their lease on the North Belridge Field; the Temblor Range is in the distance.

The discovery well was drilled by Mannell-Minor Petroleum Company, "M.M. No. 1", in 1912, into the "Fractured Shale" Pool. No initial production data were compiled, and it was not until 1915 that oil recovery amounts in barrels per day are available.

In 1979, Shell Oil acquired Belridge Oil Company, the long-time operator of the field, and maintained most of the production until 1997, at which time Aera Energy LLC, a joint venture of Shell and Mobil Oil Company, took over. However the North Belridge component of the giant field had several small independent operators, most of which have either left or have been acquired by larger companies. Current operators on the field as of 2008 include Aera Energy LLC; American Energy Operations, Inc.; and Greka Energy. In 2008 Aera was the largest operator, with approximately 1,300 active oil wells. American Energy had approximately 150, and Greka Energy 73. American Energy produces from the Dow Chanslor lease, which straddles the boundary between the North and South Belridge fields, while Greka maintains a group of production wells along Highway 33 in the northeast portion, in the Belridge, Gibson and McPhail leases.

Several enhanced recovery methods have been employed at the North Belridge Field, including cyclic steam (the "huff and puff" method, on the heavy oil in the Tulare pool); steam flooding; gas injection (on the Temblor Sands and the Y Sand); and waterflooding.

Over 2,800 wells had been drilled on the field since its discovery in 1912.

== See also ==
- South Belridge Oil Field
