= Cat Canyon Oil Field =

Oil field in California, US

Coordinates: 34.8336°N 120.3042°W

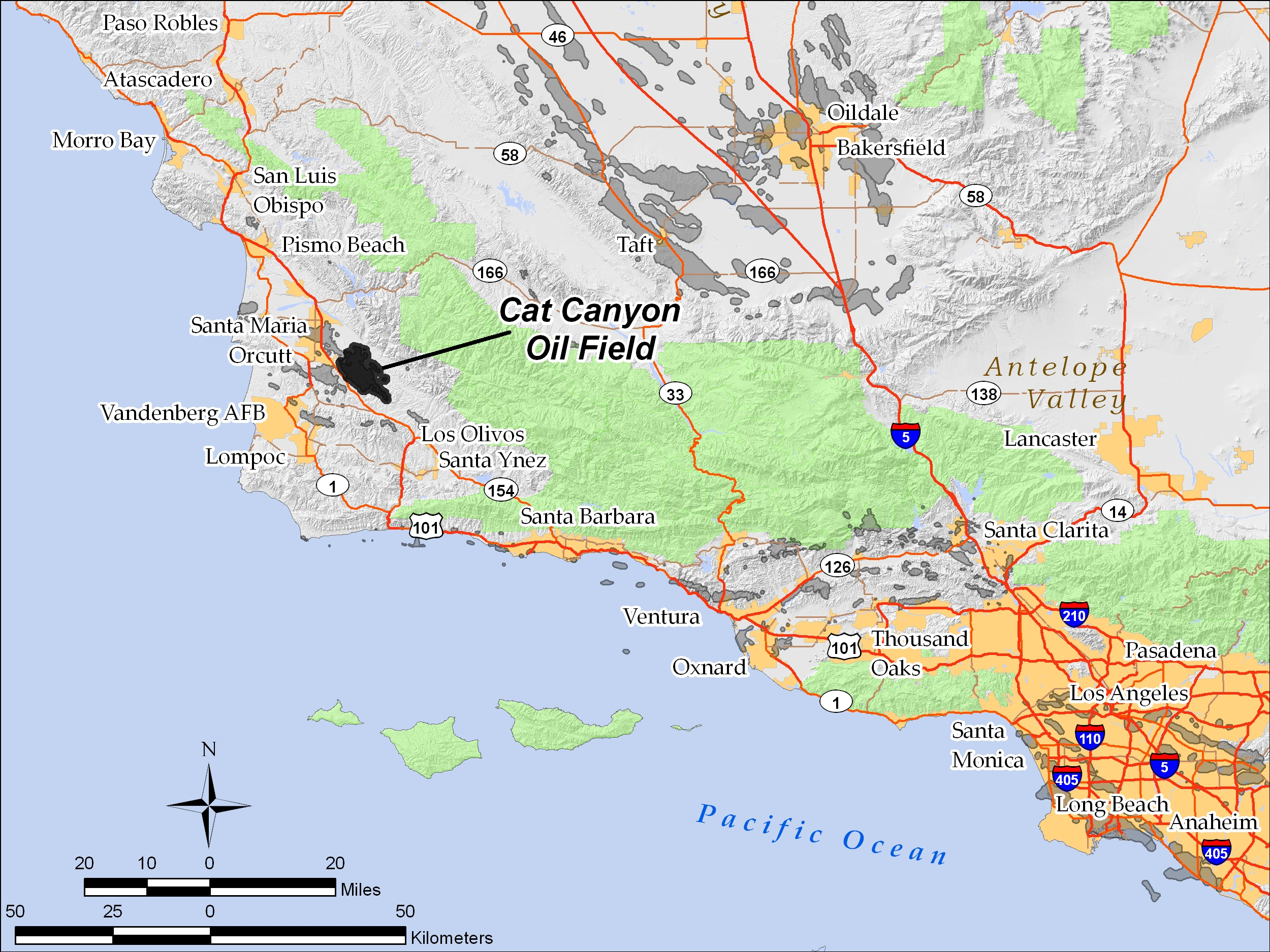
- The Cat Canyon Oil Field in Santa Barbara County, California
- Country: United States
- Region: Santa Maria Basin
- Location: Santa Barbara County, California
- Offshore/onshore: onshore
- Operators: Greka Energy (HVI Cat Canyon, Inc.), ERG Operating Company LLC, Vintage Production, B.E. Conway

Field history
- Discovery: 1908
- Start of development: 1908
- Start of production: 1908
- Peak year: 1953

Production
- Current production of oil: 795 barrels per day (~39,600 t/a)
- Year of current production of oil: 2009
- Estimated oil in place: 2.132 million barrels (~2.909×10^{5} t)
- Producing formations: Monterey Shale (fractured), Sisquoc Formation

The Cat Canyon Oil Field is a large oil field in the Solomon Hills of central Santa Barbara County, California, about 10 miles southeast of Santa Maria. It is the largest oil field in Santa Barbara County, and as of 2010 is the 20th-largest in California by cumulative production.

The field was discovered in 1908, just seven years after the nearby Orcutt field. At first it was developed slowly, because of difficulties in drilling and keeping wells productive, but as ever-richer reservoirs were revealed in the next two decades it gradually became one of the most productive fields in the state. A mature field in decline, estimated reserves have dwindled to 2.3 million barrels, less than one percent of the total produced in the preceding century. A total of 243 wells remained active, although a field revitalization program commenced by ERG Resources in 2011 intends to extend the field's lifetime by extracting reserves previously considered unrecoverable. The largest operators currently active on the field are Greka Energy with 168 active wells, and ERG, who plans to bring over 300 shut-in wells back into production.

== Geographic setting ==
The oil field extends from the southeastern extreme of the flat Santa Maria Valley south and southeast into the Solomon Hills. It is approximately ten miles long on the northwest to southeast axis, and four miles across at its widest point. It is divided into three major areas: East/Central, West, and Sisquoc. In addition to these major areas, the field has three smaller, outlying areas: Olivera Canyon, Tinaquaic, and Gato Ridge. The Gato Ridge area in the extreme southeast was once considered to be a separate field. Total productive area of the oil field is 8,970 acres.

Vegetation in the area is predominantly chaparral and oak woodlands (California montane chaparral and woodlands), with riparian areas along the creeks and grasslands on many hillsides. Some of the flat areas are agricultural, and much of the area which is not either farmed or directly used for oil production is also used for grazing. Wine grapes are also grown in the area: Sutter Home Winery owns a vineyard adjacent to the oil field on Cat Canyon Road near U.S. Highway 101. Terrain is rolling to steep, with some flat bottomlands along the more significant watercourses, such as the Sisquoc River, and the terrain also flattens to the north-northwest at the boundary of the Santa Maria Valley. Most of the Solomon Hills east of U.S. Highway 101 are included within the oilfield boundary.

The region has a Mediterranean climate, with cool and rainy winters, and dry summers during which the heat is moderated by prevailing winds from the cold waters of the Pacific Ocean, 20 miles to the west. Approximately 15 inches (38 cm) of rain falls in a typical winter, with the rainy season lasting from around November to April. Drainage for the central and eastern portions of the field is to the north and northeast along Cat Canyon into the Sisquoc River. To the west and southwest, water flows out to the sea by way of San Antonio Creek.

== Geology ==
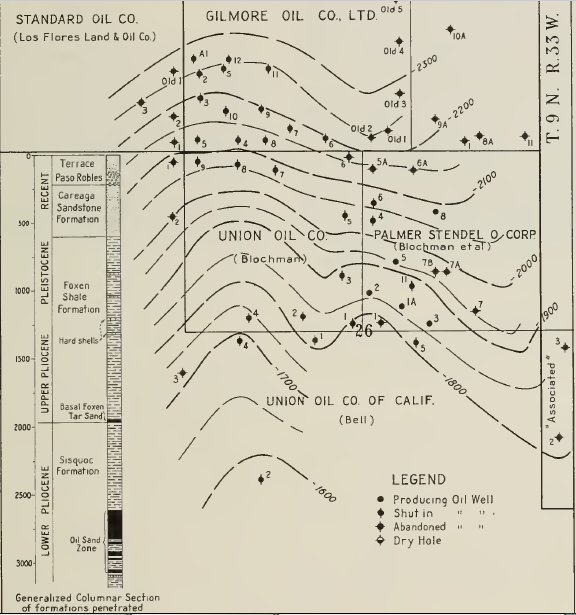
West Cat Canyon Oil Field Structure Map

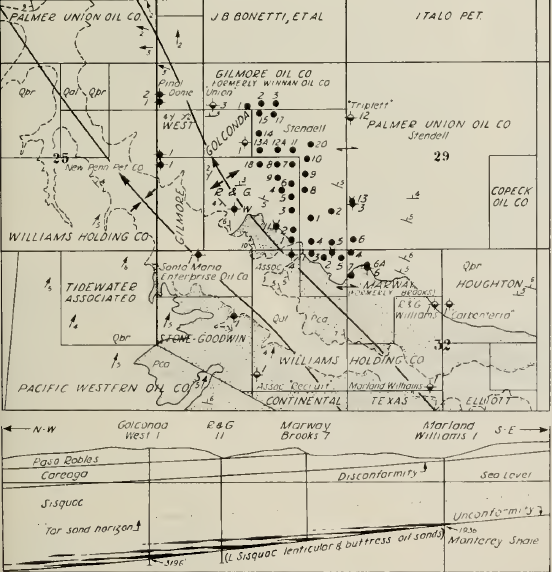
East Cat Canyon Oil Field Structure Map

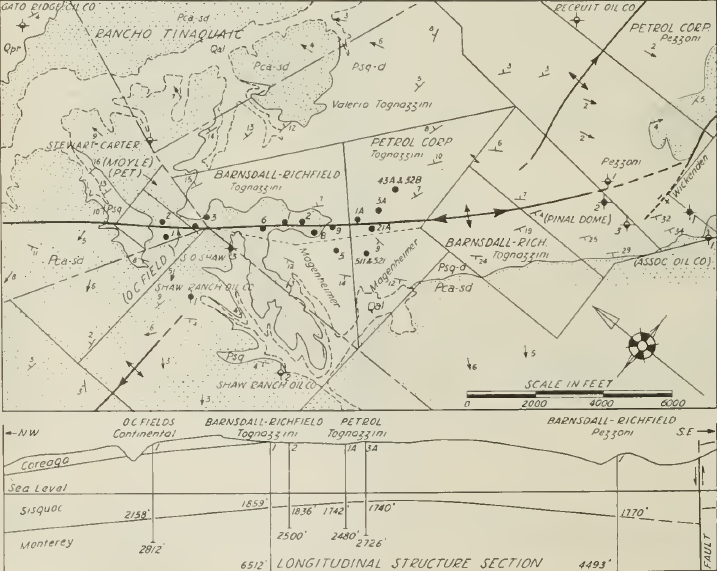
Gato Ridge Area of Cat Canyon Oil Field Structure Map

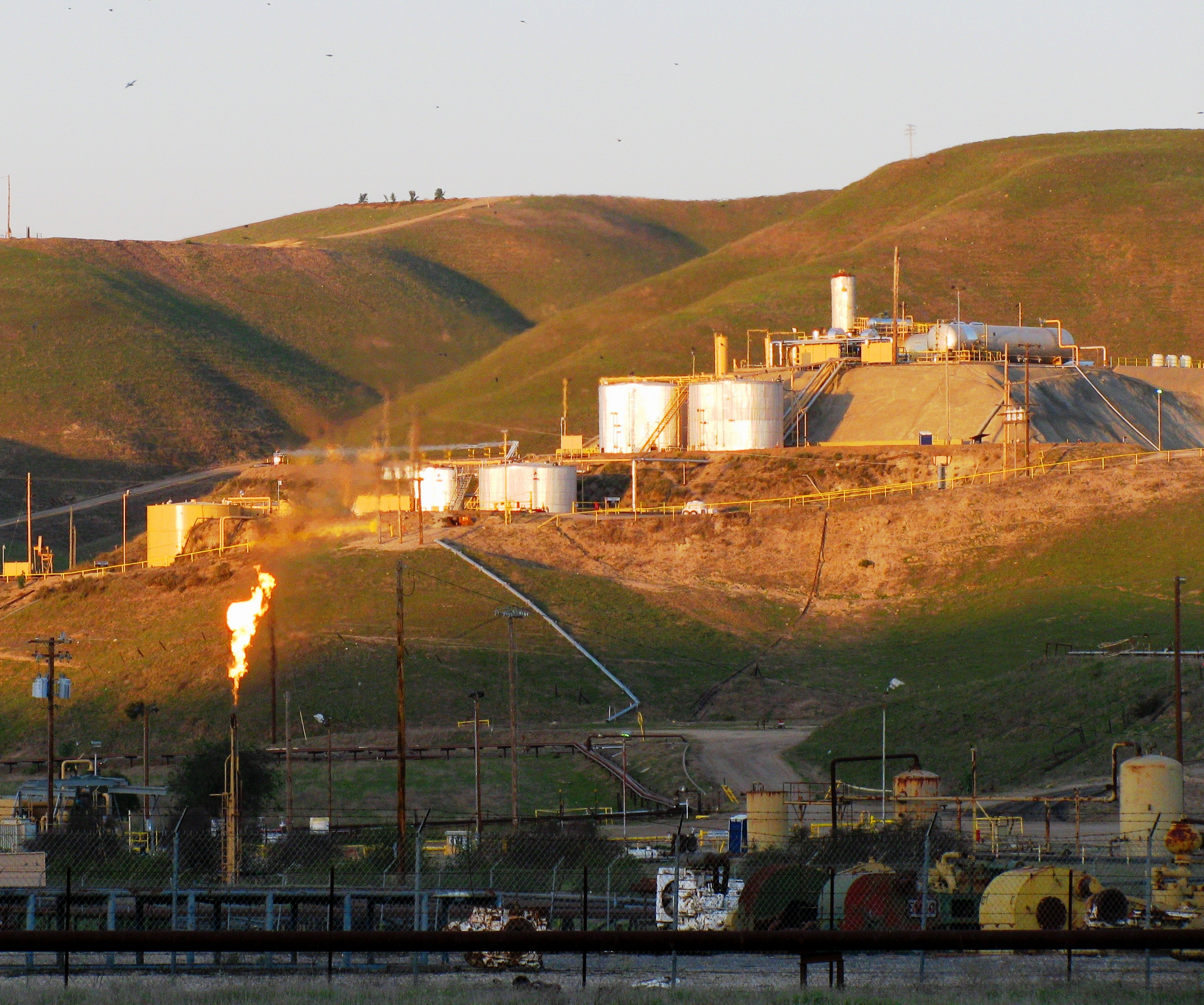
Tank batteries and laydown area for ERG Resources development in the Cat Canyon field

The Cat Canyon field is one of several in the Santa Maria Basin in which the Monterey Formation is both the primary source rock and the primary reservoir rock. Deposited in Miocene time, approximately 6 to 16 million years ago, the rock is rich in organic carbon – averaging 3.5%, but ranging from 1 to 20% – and has aged sufficiently to allow the organic detritus to evolve into oil, mostly heavy and with high sulfur content. Another possible source rock other than the Monterey is the Rincon Formation, which underlies the Monterey in some parts of the oil field. Oil produced from these source rocks has migrated upwards, forming reservoirs in both structural and stratigraphic traps. The Cat Canyon field shows both types of trapping mechanisms. In the West Area, oil is present in the overlying Sisquoc Formation in several sand units, in stratigraphic traps – pinched out within less-permeable units – while deeper oil is trapped in the structural trap of the faulted Las Flores anticline, within the fractured shale of the Monterey Formation.

The most productive portions of the Cat Canyon field are along and northeast of the southeast-to-northwest trending Las Flores anticline, the surface expression of which is the crest of the Solomon Hills. The Gato Ridge anticline to the southeast has a similar function with respect to that detached part of the oil field. Overlying the oil-bearing rocks of the Sisquoc and the Monterey formations, throughout the field, are several layers of less permeable, non-oil-bearing rocks, including the Foxen, Careaga, and Paso Robles formations.

Oil in the field is generally heavy, with API gravity ranging from 6 to 18, except in the West Area where the range is 11 to 23. In the low ranges, especially when below 10 degrees API, oil has difficulty flowing and usually requires assistance from a diluent, steam, water flooding, or another mechanism. Diluents, steam, and water flooding have all been used on the Cat Canyon field. Sulfur content of oil from the field is high, ranging from 3 to 6 percent by weight.

== History ==
Oil discoveries in the 1880s and 1890s in Los Angeles County, and along the south coast of Santa Barbara County, encouraged drillers to investigate the northern part of Santa Barbara County, and they were quickly rewarded, with the discovery of the huge Orcutt field in 1901 and the Lompoc field in 1903. The first attempts to find oil in the Cat Canyon area took place in 1904, with two attempts by Rice Ranch Oil Co. to find oil or gas. Both wells failed on boulders and loose sand which plugged the well bores. Palmer Oil Company succeeded in 1908, drilling to 3,200 feet with a well that produced 150 barrels a day. Compared to the gigantic gushers of the Orcutt field, it was a modest success at first. However, after several months it began to flow, and then spout, becoming an immense gusher producing in excess of 10,000 barrels per day before clogging up with sand and ceasing altogether. Similarly, oil in the east area of Cat Canyon was discovered by Brooks Oil Company in 1909 when Well No. 1 was drilled to a depth of 2,615 feet.

In the early years, numerous small oil companies drilled the field, with little coordination. Palmer Oil was the most successful of the early producers, along with Pinal Dome Oil Company, Santa Maria Oil Fields Inc., and Union Oil Company of California, which preceded Unocal. By 1912, there were 35 wells on the field, developed by 26 different companies, but only three of the wells were consistent producers; all of the others had failed on heaving sands or other unfavorable subsurface conditions.

The field expanded until the end of the First World War, at which time drilling slowed down, ceasing entirely in 1927. The field was difficult, its oil was heavy and difficult to market except for asphalt, and the plunge in oil prices during the Great Depression discouraged further exploration.

With the discovery of the adjacent Santa Maria Valley field in 1934, interest in the area was renewed, and a new period of drilling and production began in 1938 when the rich Los Flores pool was discovered in a new type of reservoir, the fractured shale of the Monterey Formation. Drilling was continuous through the Second World War, and by 1952 there were 80 new wells just in the west part of the field.

As production began its inevitable decline with the exhaustion of easily recovered oil, and consequent drop in reservoir pressure, drillers began trying secondary recovery techniques. Gas injection was used from 1947 in the west part of the field, and several waterfloods were attempted as well. Peak oil production from the entire Cat Canyon field was in 1953, coinciding with development of newly discovered pools and enhanced recovery techniques in existing drilling operations.

The advent of tertiary recovery techniques in the 1960s made possible another pulse of development of the field. In 1963, several cyclic steam projects commenced, followed by steam flooding, and in some cases fire flooding – all techniques for mobilizing heavy, viscous oil relatively close to the surface. At the end of 2009, all of the cyclic steam and steam flood wells were reported to be shut in, while water flood and water disposal wells remained in use on the field.

In July 2010 ERG Resources, LLC, of Houston, Texas, acquired the assets of Chevron on the field, consisting of over 300 wells, most of which had been out of production for more than 20 years. The company stated the intention to return most of them to production. Given that the price of oil had risen to over $80 per barrel at the time of purchase, and that recovery technology for heavy oil had greatly advanced since Chevron had produced the wells, the operation would be profitable to ERG. In November 2011, ERG acquired permits to drill another 15 to 20 wells, and was preparing applications for about twice that many more.

== Production and operations ==
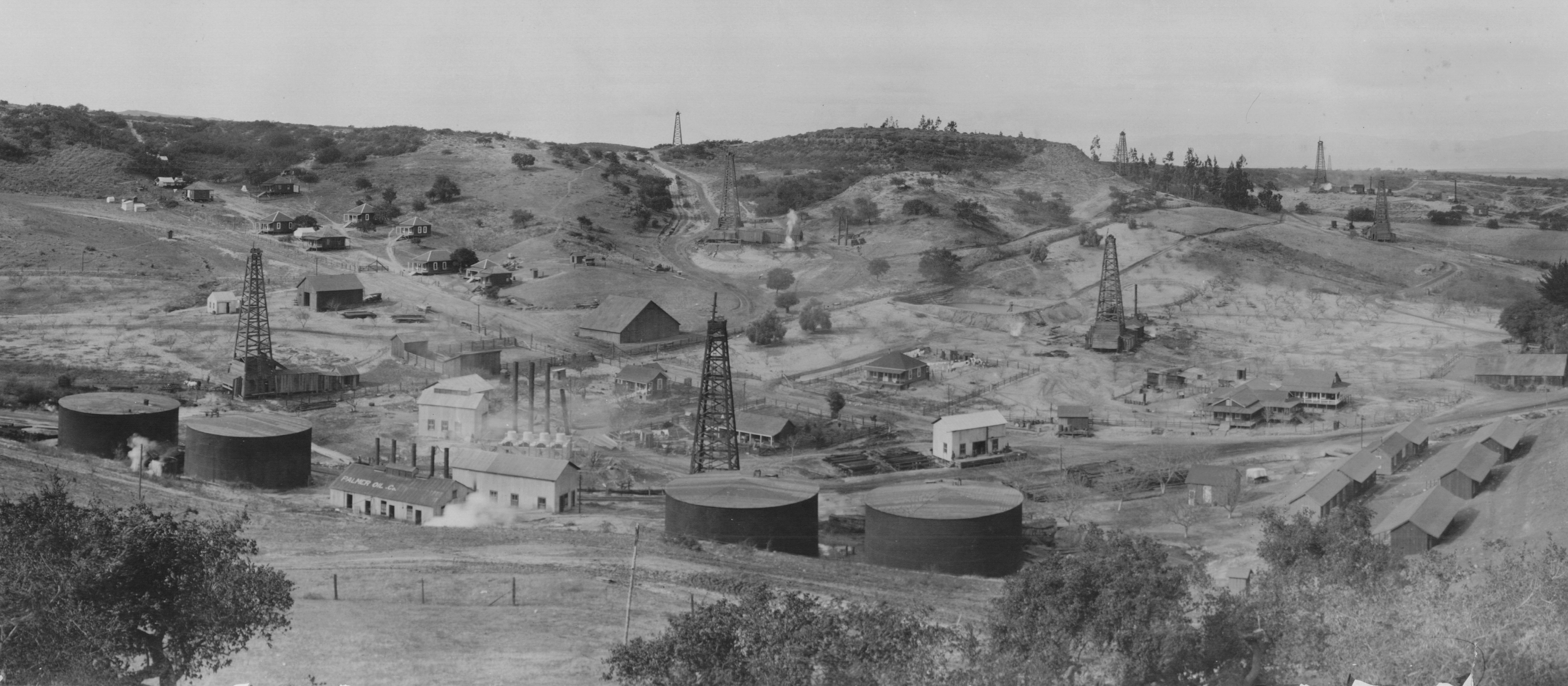
Cat Canyon Oil Field circa 1910-1912, showing Palmer Oil Co., oil derricks, newly constructed worker housing and other facilities

As of the beginning of 2010, there were 243 active oil wells on the field, with another 727 shut in. The West Area had the most active wells, with 99, followed by the Sisquoc Area with 64 and the Gato Ridge Area with 43. The East Area had the highest proportion of shut in wells to active, with 269 and 20 respectively. This area was formerly produced by Aera Energy. Throughout the field the average water cut – the percentage of liquid drawn from wells which is water – was 92.4 percent, indicative of a mature field.

Greka processes its oil onsite at the Bell Lease. The processing and treatment facility consists of boilers, an oil-water separator, storage tanks, and pipelines both for gathering oil and gas from the wells and for sending it offsite. Gas from the field is used as a fuel onsite to heat oil in the tanks and power the pumping units, and some is sent by pipeline offsite. Sulfur is scrubbed from the gas prior to use. Oil leaves the field both by pipeline and by truck. Water separated from the oil is disposed by reinjection into the producing formation.

In early 2012 the four operators with the most active wells on the field were Greka Energy, B.E. Conway, ERG, and Vintage Petroleum.

== Environmental compliance issues ==
Greka's Cat Canyon operation has been listed by the Santa Barbara County Air Pollution Control District as a "significant risk facility". Three Health Risk Assessments have been performed, in 1991, 1994, and 1998, all before Greka acquired the facilities, and they showed steadily decreasing cancer and non-cancer risks. From 1991 to 1998, the cancer risk had declined from 63 in a million to 12 in a million.

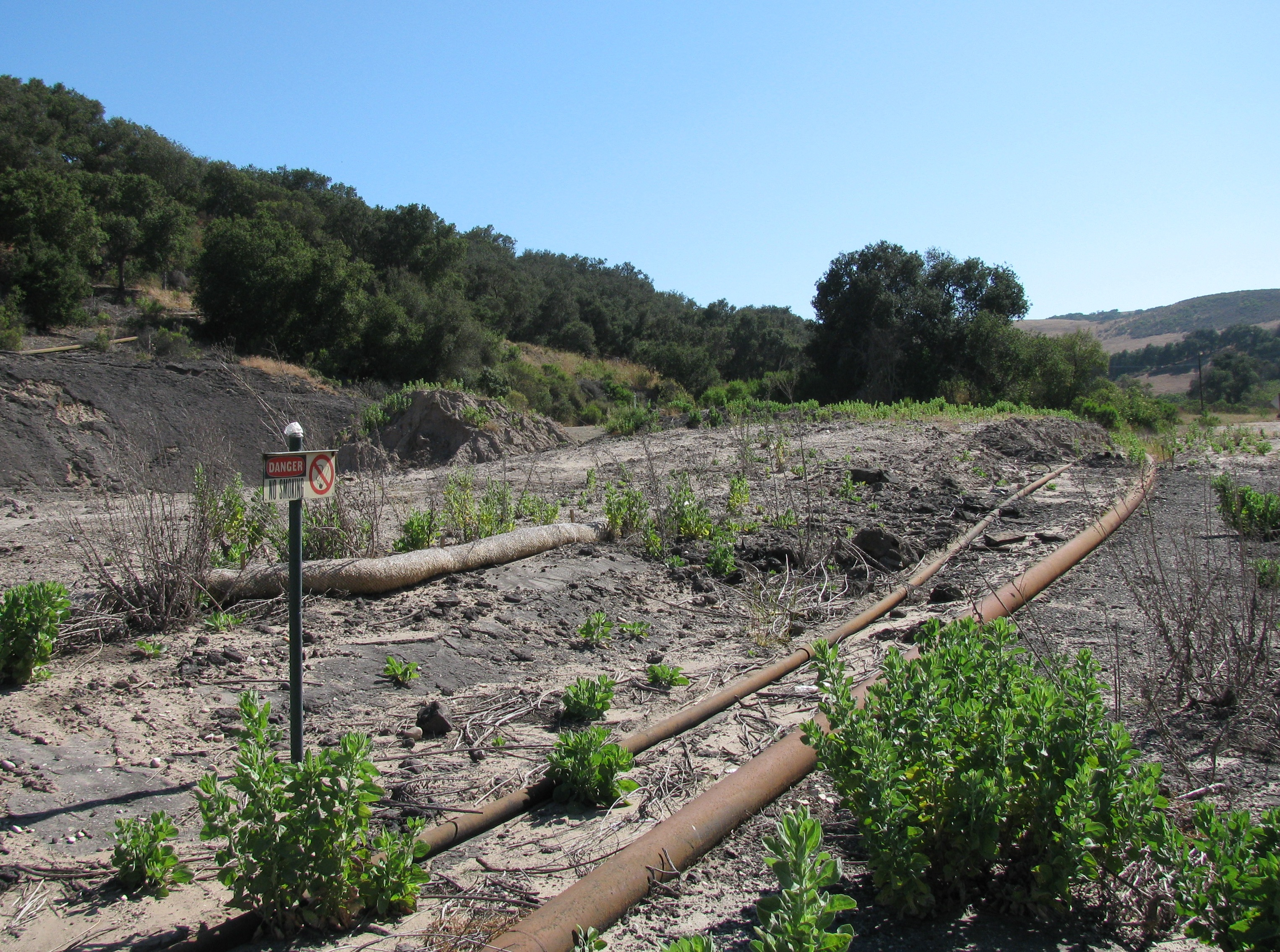
Partially cleaned oil spill along Palmer Road, on the Bell Lease of the Cat Canyon Field. The asphaltic material throughout the photograph is weathered crude oil; a containment boom is visible at left center, and two pipelines run along the right of the picture.

On December 7, 2007, Greka spilled over 58,000 US gallons (220 m^{3}) of oil at their Bell Lease on the field, along Palmer Road. The U.S. EPA took control of the cleanup effort on this and two other spills on the same lease after Greka failed to comply with their requirements. Greka claimed that they were progressing on an initiative to become more eco-friendly – "Greka Green" – by replacing corroding infrastructure with more modern equipment less likely to emit pollutants.
