= Mussel Shoals =

Mussel Shoals may refer to:

- Mussel Shoals, California
- Muscle Shoals, Alabama, sometimes misspelled "Mussel Shoals"

== See also ==
- Muscle Shoals (disambiguation)
