= Rincon Island (California) =

Artificial island for oil well drilling offshore of Ventura County, California

Coordinates: 34.347365°N 119.445253°W

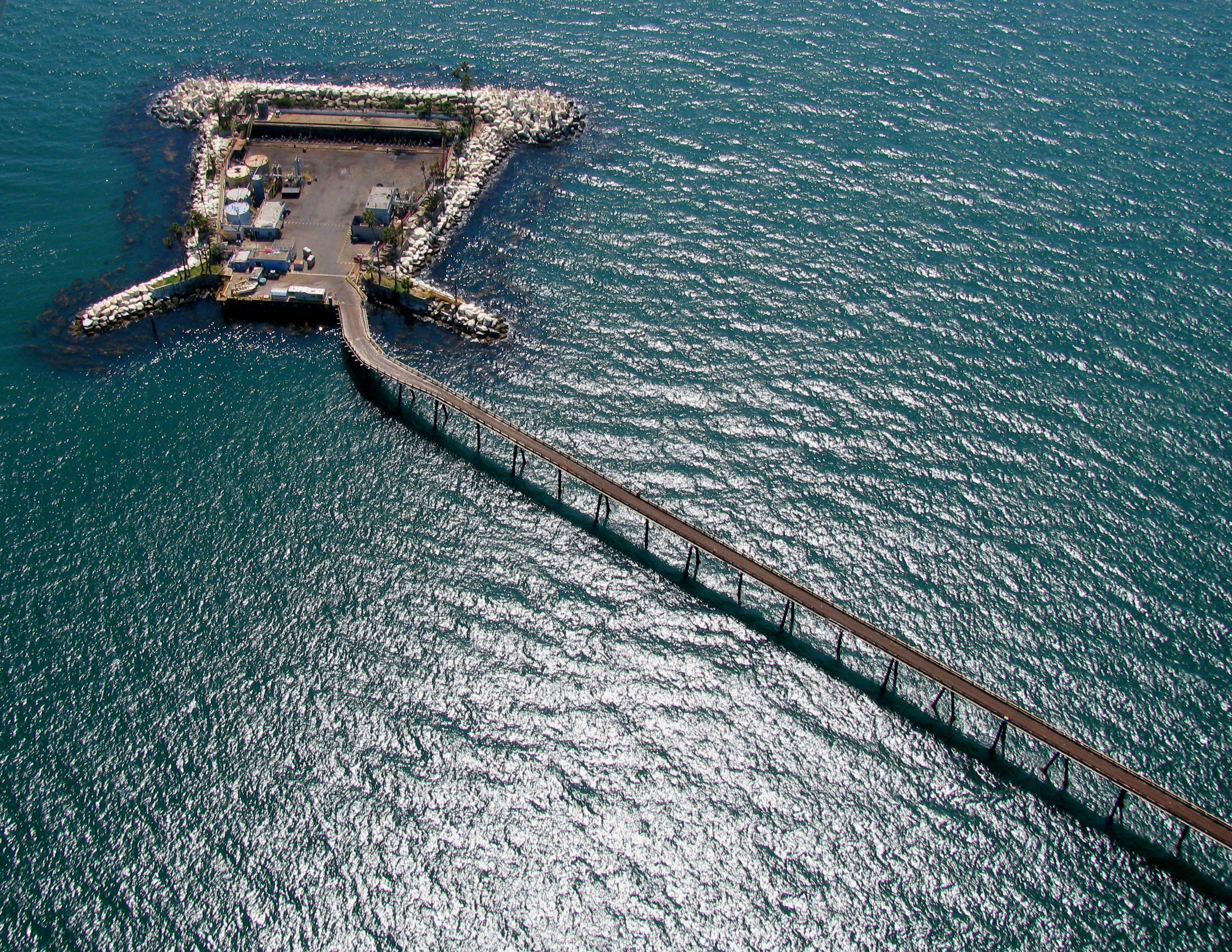
Rincon Island, showing the causeway connecting it to the mainland.

Rincon Island (Spanish: Rincón, meaning "Corner") is a small 2.3-acre artificial island located off Mussel Shoals (also called "Little Rincon") in Ventura County, California on public land leased from the California State Lands Commission (CSLC). The island is situated approximately 3,000 feet (910 m) offshore in 55 feet (17 m) of water. The island was constructed in 1958 for the specific purpose of well drilling and oil and gas production. It is near the seaside communities of Mussel Shoals and La Conchita. The island is connected to the mainland by the Richfield Pier.

The Rincon basin properties cover approximately 1,700 mineral acres (6.9 km^{2}), including a 2.3-acre (9,300 m^{2}) island connected to land by a 2,700-foot (820 m) causeway containing the gas and oil pipelines and facilitating vehicular access. Greka Energy, the last petroleum company operating at the site, faced numerous safety and permit violations.

== Area history ==
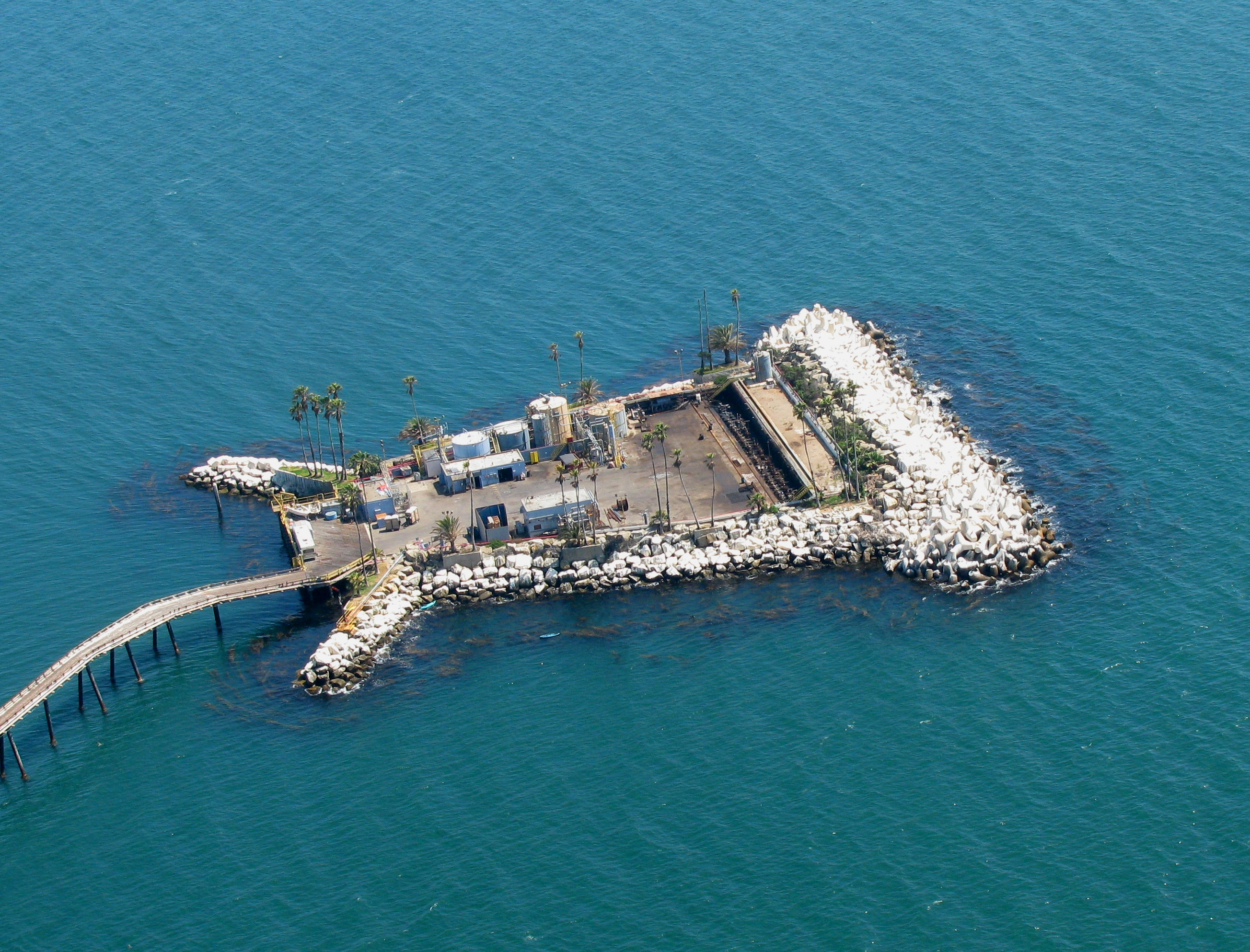
Rincon Island; view from above, looking southeast

Rincon means "corner" in Spanish. The area was said to be a battleground of the Chumash and the site of an 1838 battle between Alvarado and Pio Pico, described in poem by Bayard Taylor, "The Fight of the Paso del Mar."

The Chumash Indians were once the largest cultural group in California. They were native inhabitants of what is today Ventura County, which was formed by splitting Santa Barbara County in 1873.

In 1913, the Rincon Sea Level Road opened between Santa Barbara and Ventura. Portions of the road through this area were causeways constructed on wood planks and pilings, as the area was passable before only at low tide.

The first oil production in the Rincon Beach area took place in 1928. This portion of the coast has good surf spots, including Rincon Point, just north at the county line.

== Usable land ==
Approximately one acre of usable space on Rincon Island lies within the depressed interior of the island which is surrounded by a perimeter berm, approximately 30 feet (9.1 m) high on the ocean/weather side and slightly lower on the land side. This berm is planted with scattered palm trees. The island's total area at ground surface is about 2.3 acres (9,300 m^{2}), rising from a base of 6 acres (24,000 m^{2}) on the sea floor. Oil production facilities are partially hidden from view within the island's interior acre, and also partially shielded by the palm trees. A one-lane causeway, 3,000 feet (910 m) long, connects the Island to shore at Punta Gorda.

== Environment ==
The local physical environment consists of the Pacific Ocean, local coastal mountains, U.S. Highway 101, several beach homes and a hotel located approximately 3,000 feet (910 m) north near the Mussel Shoals exit along Highway 101, the nearby community of La Conchita, and other nearby petroleum production facilities.

In 1978, a study was conducted on the impact of the island, "Ecological Effects of an Artificial Island, Rincon Island." The study documented marine ecological conditions. Habitat features associated with the armor rock and concrete tetrapods surrounding the island support a microecosystem, a rich and varied fauna and flora associated with the high-relief solid substrate of the island, which differs substantially from the more depauperate natural bottom habitats in the area.

== Rincon Oil Field ==
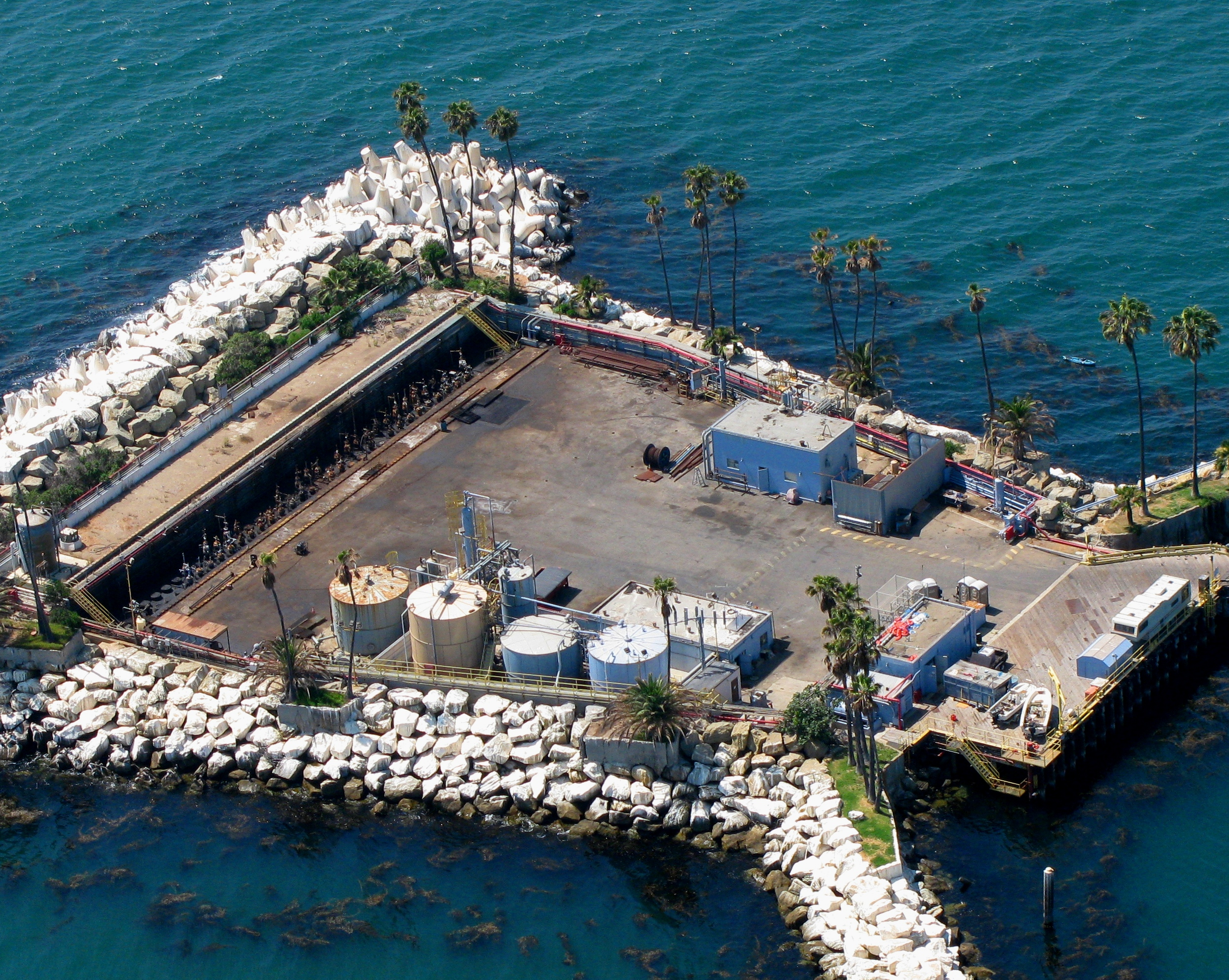
Central area of operations on Rincon Island

The offshore leasing of the Rincon Oil Field began from 1929 to 1931 with the issuance of leases for the lands and ended in 1955 with the issuance of a new state lease, PRC 1466. Several different oil companies have held these leases over the years. By the end of the 1980s, ARCO and Berry Corporation held all the various state leasehold interests at Rincon, except one small portion owned by Energy Development Corporation.

In 1992, the California State Lands Commission approved the assignment by ARCO to Berry of all its interests in the Rincon leases. When approving that assignment, the Commission required that ARCO remain liable for removing Rincon Island and the causeway leading to it. BP, which acquired ARCO, now has this liability. In 1995, the Commission approved the assignment of Berry’s interest in the Rincon leases to RILP with the condition that Berry remain liable for removing the Island and the causeway.

=== Production ===
In early 1997, Calgary, Alberta-based Windsor Energy Corporation, whose principal property was the Rincon Island property, completed its second long reach well on its Rincon Island lease. Here production increased from about 200 barrels (32 cubic metres) per day of oil equivalent in 1995 to about 3,000 bbl (480 m^{3}) per day by 1998.

When Windsor acquired the Rincon Island Field, 16 wells were producing and 51 wells were shut-in. Windsor quickly brought six of the shut-in wells back into production, abandoned six considered non-commercial, and drilled 19 new commercial wells. The wells at Rincon produced from depths between 1,700 and 2,800 feet (850 m) from the Miley sands of the Upper Pliocene-aged Pico Formation in an anticline, which plunges from the west towards the east.

=== Key party bankruptcies ===
On August 20, 1998, Rincon Island Limited Partnership (RILP) and its managing general partner, Canada's Windsor Energy, filed a voluntary petition in the Bankruptcy Court, seeking relief under Chapter 11 of the Bankruptcy Code. On 29 January of that year, Stanton Capital Corp., a private investment firm, agreed to buy about half of the parent's assets, including the Rincon Island partnership, for approximately $170 million. On May 13, the parent announced that the proposed sale had fallen through because low product prices rendered Stanton's plan to add capital to the assets and take them public unfeasible.

Pursuant to a confirmed plan of reorganization, Rincon continues to operate the state leases, subject to the continuing jurisdiction of the Bankruptcy Court. Compass Bank, the principal creditor of RILP, held a first priority lien on the assets of RILP, the stock of RILP's managing general partner, Windsor, and the partner's equity interest in RILP.

In June 2001, Compass Bank foreclosed on all of the stock of Windsor and the partner's interest in RILP, thereby assuming indirect control of RILP. RILP, under the indirect control of Compass Bank, continues to operate the state leases on an interim basis. Compass Bank has indicated to staff that it acquired RILP with the intent of disposing of the limited partnership, or all of the assets, as quickly as possible. Compass Bank has actively been seeking a buyer for the properties.

== Greka acquisition ==
In October 2002, Greka Energy Corp., then a publicly traded company based in New York, bought the Rincon Island operation, which included 56 wells, and assumed about $1.7 million of debt. Greka's current primary areas of activity are in California, where it has interests in heavy oil fields and an asphalt plant. A separate Greka entity, also owned by CEO Randeep Grewal, is active in China, where it has signed production agreements for coalbed methane properties.

Greka is Santa Barbara County's largest onshore oil producer and is also a major employer in Santa Maria. Greka also owns and operates the only asphalt plant in the county, producing asphalt for most of the area's roads, highways and parking lots.

Greka was formed in 1999 after the merger of two publicly traded companies, Saba Petroleum Company and Horizontal Ventures. In May 2003, Greka chairman and chief executive officer Randeep S. Grewal formed Alexi Holdings Ltd. to effect a reverse merger with Greka, taking the company private. Prior to the buyout, he held a 14.3% stake in the company. The price paid for the buyout was a 69% premium over the $3.70 closing price for Greka's stock May 19, 2003, the day before Grewal announced his intent to take the company private. CIBC World Markets advised Greka on Grewal's offer.

In 2005, Greka Energy filed for voluntary Chapter 7 bankruptcy liquidation in New York, beset by legal judgments, state environmental litigation and a federal criminal probe. Greka's Nov 30, 2005, bankruptcy filing, under the name Saba Enterprises and including Greka, Horizontal Ventures and Petro Union, listed debts of up to $50 million but assets of less than $50,000, and Greka listed unsecured creditors including Chevron's UNOCAL arm.

As all petroleum extracted from California state lands is subject to a royalty, Greka has paid the state about $143,000 for oil and gas pumped from Rincon Island during the first half of 2007.

== Spills, safety, lease termination, and quitclaim to state ==
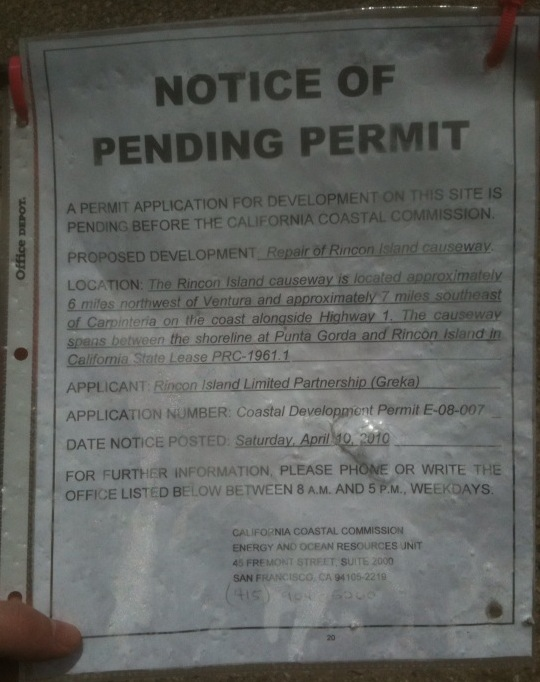
Planning Permission posted at Rincon Island

Rincon Island's production history includes spills and safety issues. In February 1998, the Los Angeles Times reported the island facility spilled 130 gallons of crude oil.

Starting in 1999, the Santa Barbara Air Pollution Control District inspected Greka facilities 855 times, citing about 300 violations. During a nine-year period, more than 200 Greka spills threatened or polluted state waters 20 times, according to published reports.

On January 3, 2008, the California State Lands Commission shut down Rincon Island due to unsafe conditions at the bridge, which pipes the oil from the island to the shoreline.

Greka resumed oil production and, by the beginning of June 2008, had produced 240 barrels of oil at Rincon Island.

As of October 2008, production was again suspended at Rincon Island when testing showed that serious structural deficiencies exist with the causeway to the island. Employees use a golf cart to reach the island because vehicle traffic is deemed too dangerous. As of the end of 2008, the lease has produced 2,622 barrels of oil for the year. The gross revenue to the State of California for 2008 is under $20,000. As indicated by the State Lands Commission Audit Program, the cost of enforcement and monitoring by the State Lands Commission of the Rincon Island 1466 lease is well in excess of $100,000 per year.

On June 17, 2011, the federal government sued Greka for over $2.4 million in cleanup costs.

Facing a potential termination of its lease by the State Lands Commission for "imprudent oil and gas operations," Rincon Island Limited Partnership, a subsidiary of Greka Energy, filed for bankruptcy on August 9, 2016. At the time, the company had not produced oil or gas from Rincon Island since October 2008.

On November 30, 2017, the Bankruptcy Court approved a joint motion to grant the State Lands Commission a quitclaim over Rincon Island, which was effected on December 6, 2017. As a result, Rincon Island was added to the California Coastal Sanctuary and the last operational oil drilling and production facility in the Santa Barbara Channel ended.

== Decommissioning ==
The California State Lands Commission has indicated that the disposition of Rincon Island and its causeway is scheduled in the second phase of its ongoing decommissioning of the former Rincon Island Limited Partnership wells. The final disposition of the island and causeway will require an environmental analysis under CEQA, public input, discretionary approval by the commission itself and other agencies, funding, and hiring a decommissioning contractor. The CEQA process for decommissioning was anticipated to begin in 2020.

The commission approved the final environmental report for the decommissioning plan in August 2024.

== See also ==
- List of islands of California
- List of artificial islands
- THUMS Islands
