= Mussel Shoals, California =

Unincorporated community in California, United States

Coordinates: 34°21′23″N 119°26′33″W

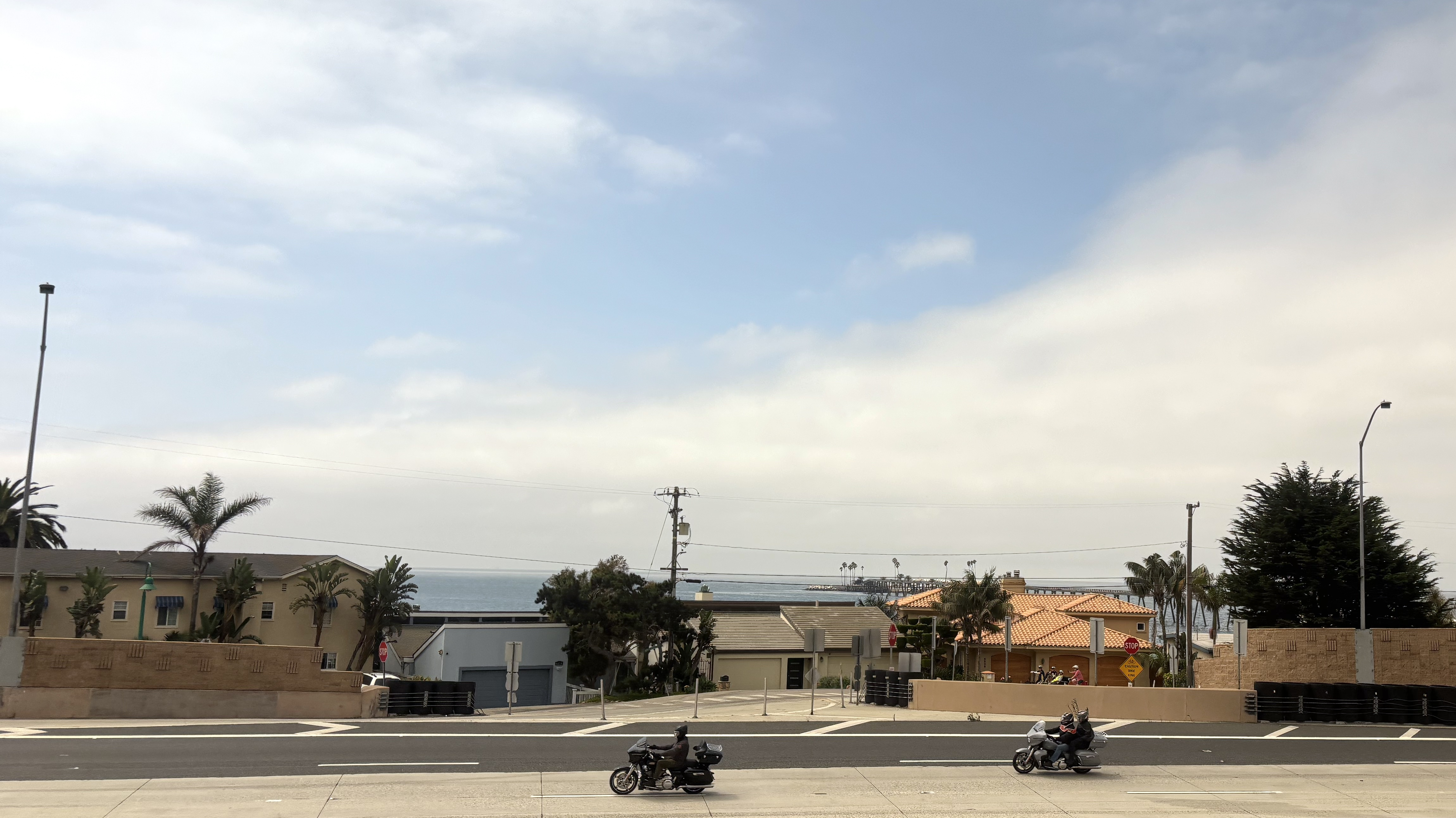
View of Mussel Shoals from passing Amtrak Coast Starlight train

Mussel Shoals is a coastal unincorporated community in Ventura County, California, United States, between Ventura and the Santa Barbara County city of Carpinteria, and not to be confused with Muscle Shoals.

The community lies along U.S. Route 101 southeast of La Conchita and northwest of Faria. A one-lane causeway links the community with artificial Rincon Island. There is public beach access, but parking is limited.

Until the 1930s, the area from Bates Road down to Mussel Shoals (then known as Mussel Rock) was referred to as La Conchita.

The community has a hotel, the Cliff House Inn. Actor Bryan Cranston purchased a home in Mussel Shoals in 2007, renovated it, and put it up for sale in 2025.
