= Zaca Oil Field =

Oil field in Santa Barbara County, California, United States

Coordinates: 34.7245°N 120.1448°W

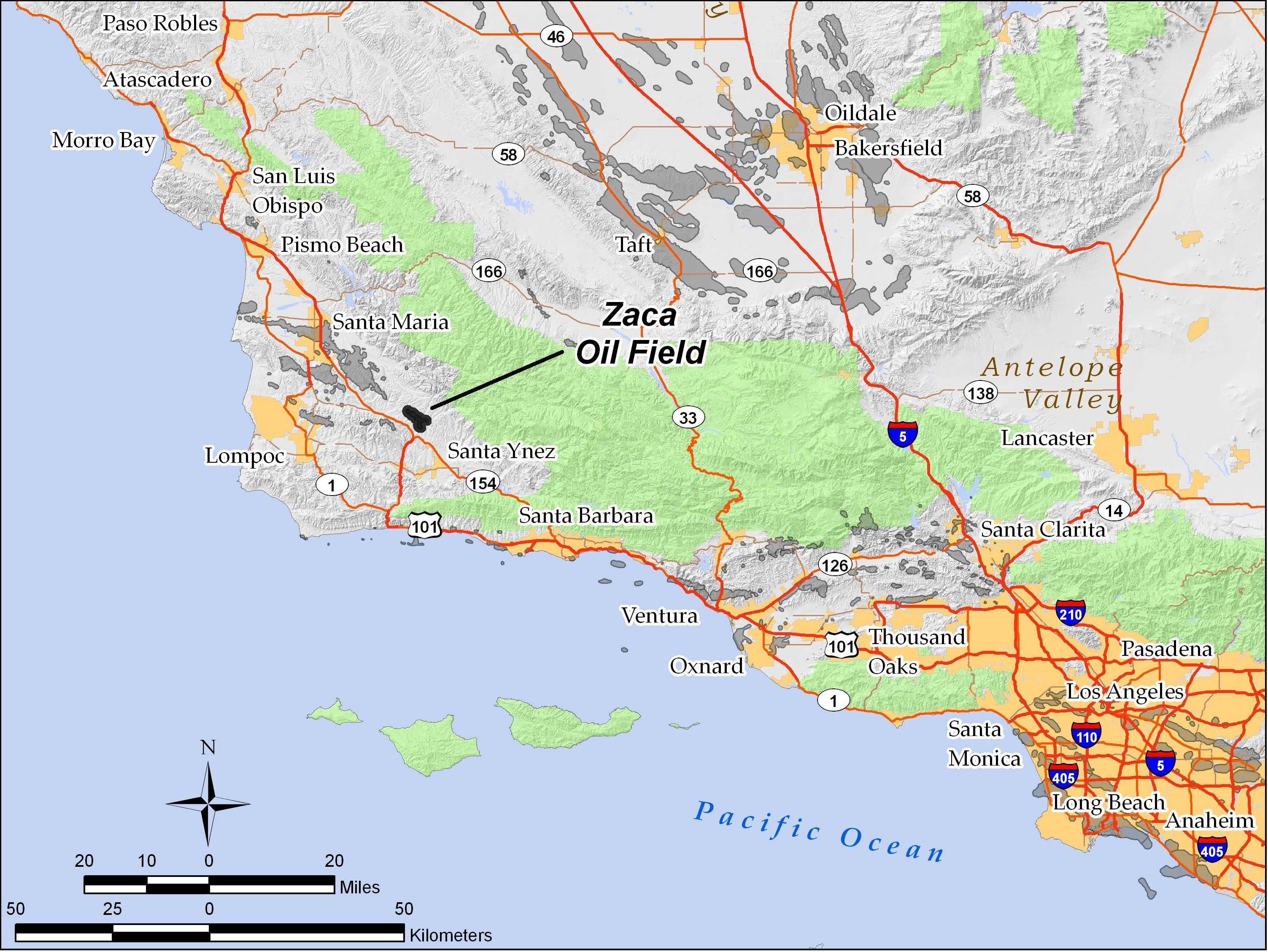
- The Zaca Oil Field in Santa Barbara County, California.
- Country: United States
- Region: Santa Maria Basin
- Location: Santa Barbara County, California
- Offshore/onshore: onshore
- Operators: Underground Energy, Greka Energy (HVI Cat Canyon, Inc.)

Field history
- Discovery: 1942
- Start of development: 1942
- Start of production: 1942
- Peak year: 1954

Production
- Current production of oil: 4,682 barrels per day (~2.333×10^{5} t/a)
- Year of current production of oil: 1954
- Estimated oil in place: 2.036 million barrels (~2.778×10^{5} t)
- Producing formations: Monterey Shale (fractured)

The Zaca Oil Field is an oil field in central Santa Barbara County, California, about 20 miles southeast of Santa Maria. One of several oil fields in the county which produce heavy oil from the Monterey Formation, the field is hidden within a region of rolling hills, north of the Santa Ynez Valley. As of 2011, the principal operator of the oil field is Greka Energy and the operator of the "Zaca Field Extension Project" is Underground Energy. The field is known to contain heavy crude oil and Underground Energy has recently discovered a lower sub-thrust block in the field, which was not previously produced by the field's historical operators. The field was discovered in 1942, reached peak production in 1954, and remains active with more than thirty oil wells and continues to grow.

== Geographic setting ==
The Zaca oil field is about four miles long by a quarter-mile across, running from northwest to southeast, paralleling U.S. Highway 101, which is about two miles to the southwest. Its southern extent is about four miles north of the town of Los Olivos, not counting the eastern "Zaca Field Extension Project", which surrounds the existing oil field and increases the southern extent by another three miles. Underground Energy acquired the acreage which circles the existing Zaca Oil Field in an acquisition completed in November of 2011. Total productive area of the oil field is approximately one square mile.

The oil field lies perpendicular to a series of ridges which form the foothills of the San Rafael Mountains, and from northwest to southeast is dissected by San Antonio Creek, Canada del Comasa, and Zaca Creek. Drainage is to the southwest, and out to the Pacific Ocean via San Antonio Creek to the west, for San Antonio Creek and Canada del Comasa, and the Santa Ynez River to the southwest, for Zaca Creek. Terrain is rolling to steep, with flat bottomlands along Zaca Creek. Most of the oilfield operations are invisible from public rights-of-way with the exception of oil pumps and a water evaporation pond along Foxen Canyon Road. Native vegetation is a mix of chaparral and oak woodlands (California montane chaparral and woodlands), with vineyards and agricultural land uses interspersed with oilfield operations (the Firestone Vineyard is adjacent to the southeastern end of the oil field; some of the oil pumps are on Firestone-owned land).

The region has a Mediterranean climate, with cool and rainy winters, and dry summers during which the heat is greatly diminished by prevailing winds from the cold waters of the Pacific Ocean, thirty miles to the west. Approximately 15 inches (38 cm) of rain falls in a typical winter, with the rainy season lasting from around November to April.

== Geology ==
The overall structure of the Zaca field is an anticline, with the oil-bearing units capped by impermeable beds covering them like the gabled roof on a house.

The productive unit in the Zaca field is fractured shale of the Monterey Formation. This is the same unit which is productive in the nearby Orcutt and Lompoc fields. As in those fields, oil has pooled in the abundant pore space provided by the fractures and along bedding planes in the unit. The Monterey Formation in this area dips to the south, and oil migrating updip has pooled against a vertical fault which marks the northeastern boundary of the field. The depth to the oil reservoir below ground surface varies from 4,000 feet at the northwestern extent of the field to about 1,000 feet at the southeastern end, with an average thickness of around 1,700 feet. Above the reservoir are the non-oil-bearing Sisquoc, Foxen, and Paso Robles formations.

Oil in the reservoir is in the "extra heavy" range, with API gravity ranging from 6 to 13.5, and averaging 8.0. In these low ranges, oil has difficulty flowing and usually requires assistance from a diluent, steam, water flooding, or another mechanism. Steam and water flooding have both been used on the Zaca field. Sulfur content of oil from the field is among the highest from any California reservoir, ranging from 6.76 to 8.00 percent by weight. Even in the earliest days of production, operators injected diluent in order to mobilize the heavy oil.

== History ==
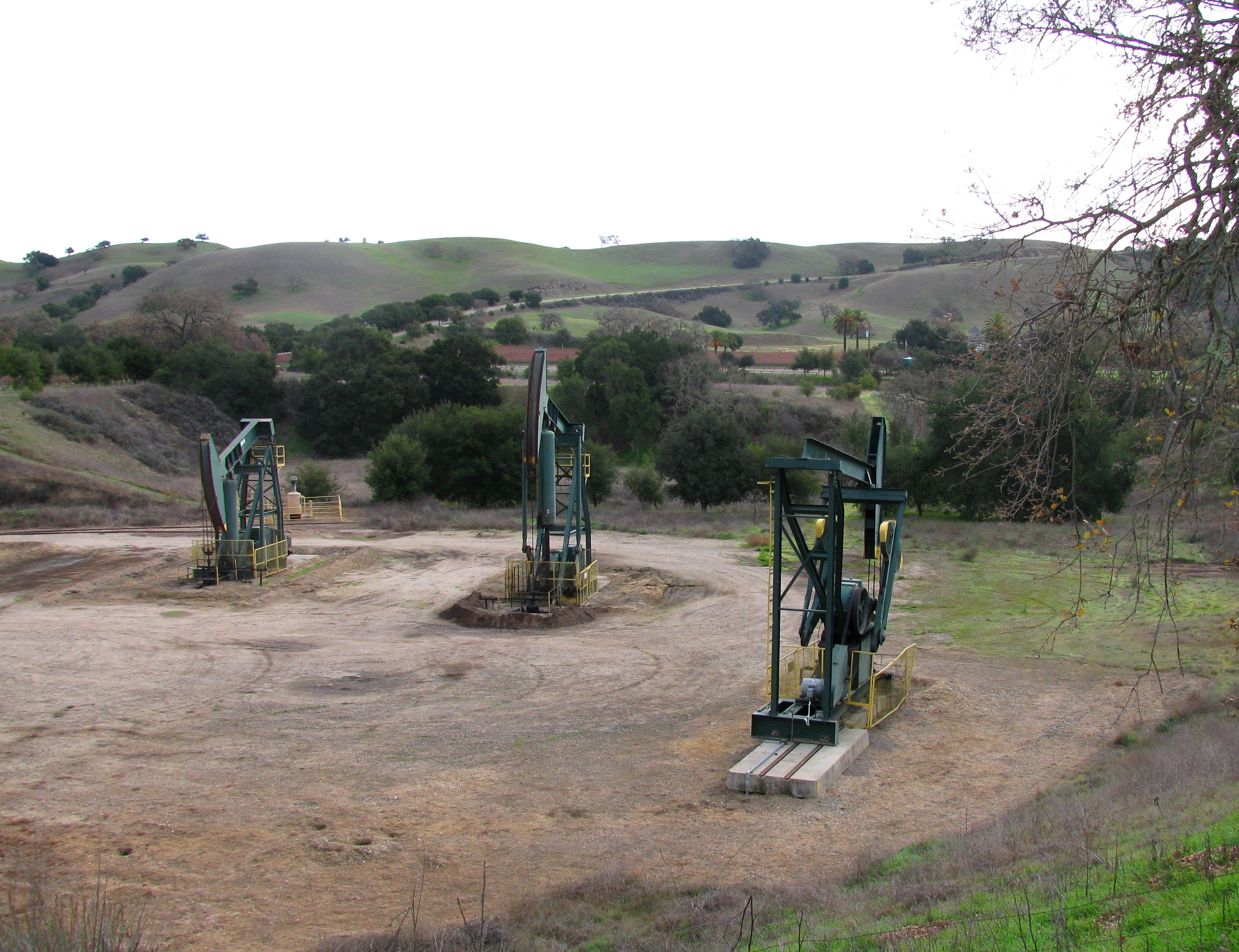
Wells in the Brown and Davis leases on the Zaca field. Wells in this cluster are directionally drilled.

Tidewater Associated Oil Company drilled the discovery well for the Zaca field in November 1942, during a period of rapid exploration for oil to aid the World War II war effort. The Davis No. 1 well produced from the fractured shale of the Monterey Formation, initially at 94 barrels a day, and settling at 150. Tidewater followed on this modest success by drilling other wells into the reservoir, and by 1948 there were ten wells producing, and it had extracted 348,000 barrels of oil. In 1953, J. Paul Getty's Getty Oil acquired Tidewater, commencing a waterflooding operation to boost production, and by 1954 the field reached its peak annual production of 1.7 million barrels.

The field operators attempted a cyclic steam recovery process in 1964, but abandoned it two years later. In 1967, Getty merged Tidewater with Missouri Oil, retiring the Tidewater name, and the field continued to produce under the new name. Texaco bought Getty Oil in 1984, and with it the operations on the Zaca field. Vintage Petroleum, then a separate company, purchased the field from Texaco in 1995 during a period in which the major oil companies were divesting many of their onshore California operations and selling them to smaller operators. Greka bought the field from Vintage in August 2002, and remains the principal operator as of 2011, though now under the name HVI Cat Canyon, Inc.

On November 1, 2011, Underground Energy, a Santa Barbara-based oil company specializing in extracting petroleum from difficult shale formations, acquired 7,750 acres adjacent to the field on the eastern side – the "Zaca Field Extension Project" – which they stated is estimated to contain over 20 million barrels of combined proved, probable, possible, and prospective reserves. Netherland, Sewell and Associates Inc., an independent resource audit firm, stated their best estimate in their report dated August 23, 2012 Underground Energy's "Zaca Field Extension Project" has 493.2 million barrels of total petroleum initially-in-place on their acreage. This report also stated the company's interests includes 12.3 million barrels of contingent oil resources and 37 million barrels of prospective oil resources.

=== Environmental compliance issues ===
The environmental compliance history of the field includes several risk assessment and remediation orders by the Santa Barbara County Air Pollution Control District (SBCAPCD), and since the purchase by Greka, several significant oil and contaminated water spills, two of which were taken over by the U.S. Environmental Protection Agency.

In 1991, the SBCAPCD ordered a Health Risk Assessment (HRA) of operations on the field, which at that time was run by Texaco. The assessment found significant cancer and non-cancer risks from emissions at several locations on the facility. At the time of the next assessment, 1994, the risks had increased, from 29 in a million for cancer to 37 in a million, and in 1998 they had dropped to 22.58 in a million, with a "significance" threshold of 10 in a million. The contaminants driving the risk analysis were polycyclic aromatic hydrocarbons (PAHs) which were produced primarily by internal combustion engines on the site. After the 2003 HRA Greka was able to reduce emissions both for cancer and non-cancer risks to "non-significance" by removing some of the engines. As a result, SBCAPCD no longer considers the Zaca field to be a significant risk facility.

However, several oil spills from facilities on the field brought Greka media attention. In 2007, Greka paid a fine of $17,500 for a tank leak at the Zaca field in which oil and produced water reached Zaca Creek.

Another more significant spill occurred on January 5, 2008, during a rainstorm. During this event, between 800 and 1200 barrels of crude oil, and a larger amount of produced water, escaped from a storage tank through a damaged pump. Of this amount, an initially estimated 20 barrels of crude oil and 50 gallons of produced water breached the secondary containment berm and entered Zaca Creek. The U.S. EPA became involved in the incident in February 2008, issuing an order to Greka to clean up the spill pursuant to the Clean Water Act, since the spill was still present in the creek three weeks after the initial event, and had fouled the creekbed for more than a mile downstream. California Department of Fish and Game estimated the total spill amount to have been 1200 barrels of crude oil.

However, Underground Energy has had a clean environmental compliance record and safety reports since they became the operator of the "Zaca Field Extension Project" in November 2011.

== Production and operations ==
As of the beginning of 2009, there were 30 active oil wells on the site, with another 16 shut in. Twelve wells were on the Monterey North Block and 18 on the South Block. Daily production was 7.6 barrels of oil per well in 2009, with an average water cut (the percentage of water in the total fluid pumped from the well) of 96.9 percent.

Oil from the field is treated onsite at a small processing facility on the Davis Lease, consisting of heaters, an oil-water separator, and storage tanks. Gas from the field is used as fuel onsite to heat the oil in the tanks and power the pumping units. Excess gas is flared; none leaves the site. Sulfur is scrubbed from the gas prior to use. Water separated from the oil is reinjected into the producing formation, where it serves as a flooding mechanism to assist in moving the heavy oil to production wells.
