= Bull Shoals =

Bull Shoals may refer to:

- Bull Shoals Dam, a concrete gravity dam on the White River in northern Arkansas
- Bull Shoals Lake, an artificial lake formed by the Bull Shoals Dam
- Bull Shoals, Arkansas, a city near the dam
- Bull Shoals-White River State Park, an Arkansas state park below the dam
