= Muscle Shoals (disambiguation) =

Muscle Shoals is a city in Alabama.

Muscle Shoals also may refer to:

- Muscle Shoals Sound Studio, an American recording studio in Sheffield, Alabama

- Muscle Shoals (film), a 2013 documentary about the studio

- Muscle Shoals Rhythm Section, a group of American session musicians based in Muscle Shoals, Alabama
- Leo "Muscle" Shoals (1916–1999), baseball player

== See also ==
- Mussel Shoals (disambiguation)
