= GlassFish Shoal =

Project Shoal
- Developer(s): Oracle Corporation
- Stable release: 1.1 / Nov 2010
- Repository: github.com/eclipse-ee4j/glassfish-shoal
- Operating system: Cross-platform
- Available in: Java 6 or Higher
- Type: Clustering Framework
- License: CDDL version 1.0 and GPL v2 license
- Website: http://shoal.java.net/

Project Shoal is a java based scalable dynamic clustering framework that provides infrastructure to build fault tolerance, reliability and availability and can be plugged into the GlassFish Application Server.

The framework can be plugged into any product needing clustering and related distributed systems capabilities without tightly binding to a specific communications infrastructure. The framework can be plugged in as an in-process component. The framework will have two broad categories of public APIs, namely, a Client API, and a Group Communication Provider API.

Some of the Shoal Capabilities are

- Shoal Group Event Notifications
- Distributed State Cache
- Shoal Automated Delegated Recovery Initiation
- Shoal Messaging
