= Aera Energy =

American gas and oil company

Aera Energy LLC
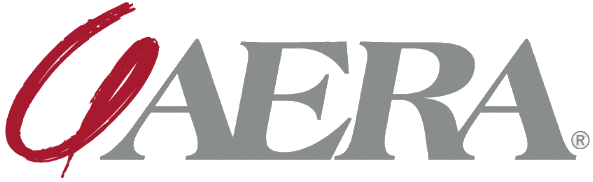
- Type: Private
- Industry: Petroleum
- Founded: 1997; 29 years ago
- Founder: Shell plc and Mobil
- Headquarters: Aera Oaks, Bakersfield, California, United States
- Area served: California
- Key people: Erik Bartsch (CEO)
- Products: Petroleum, natural gas
- Number of employees: 1,100
- Parent: California Resources Corporation
- Website: aeraenergy.com

Aera Energy LLC (or simply Aera) is a natural gas, oil exploration and extraction company started as a joint venture between Shell plc (through Shell USA) and Mobil (which later merged to form ExxonMobil). Headquartered in Bakersfield, California, Aera Energy LLC is a California limited liability company, and one of California's largest oil and natural gas extractors, with an approximate 2015 revenues of over $2 billion. Aera is operated as a stand-alone company through its board of managers.

In August 2022, IKAV, a European investment company, announced it was buying Aera from Shell and ExxonMobil. In July 2024, California Resources Corporation completed a $2.1 billion, all-stock purchase acquisition of Aera.

== Business areas ==
Most of Aera's production is located in the San Joaquin Valley. The company also has oil field operations in Ventura, Monterey and Fresno counties and has begun the permitting process to redevelop the East Cat Canyon oilfield in northern Santa Barbara County. Aera produces approximately 126,300 barrels of oil and 32 million cubic feet of natural gas each day, and has proved oil and natural gas reserves equivalent to approximately 536 million barrels of oil. Aera produces nearly 25 percent of California's oil and natural gas.

The work force needs of Aera are provided by Aera Energy Services Company (Aera Services), a Delaware corporation. Aera and Aera Services employ about 1,100 people and hundreds of contractor companies.

The company began operating as Aera Energy LLC on June 1, 1997, and consists of the California onshore and offshore exploration and production assets previously operated by CalResources LLC (a former Shell affiliate), Mobil Exploration & Producing US Inc. (now an ExxonMobil affiliate), and ARCO.

== Other business interests ==
=== Belridge Project ===
In 2017, Aera Energy launched its plan to build California's largest solar field in partnership with GlassPoint Solar. This initiative called Belridge Project covers 770 acres and it is constructed to assist the company's oil extraction process and make it more sustainable.

=== Coles Levee Ecosystem Preserve ===
The Coles Levee Ecosystem Preserve, located about 20 miles (32 km) southwest of Bakersfield, consists of 6,059 acres (24.52 km^{2}) of habitat.^{6} More than a dozen rare, threatened and endangered birds, animals and plant life can be found in the preserve. The preserve encompasses the last two miles (3 km) of riparian habitat along the Kern River, where it drains into Buena Vista Lake.

Established in 1992 by ARCO and the California Department of Fish and Game, the preserve was acquired by Aera in 1998. The preserve is largely riparian habitat and is surrounded by active oil fields (the North Coles Levee Oil Field and South Coles Levee Oil Field, as well as the Elk Hills Oil Field to the west, operated by California Resources Corporation.^{7}

=== Real estate development ===
As oil and gas production declines in the Los Angeles Basin, Aera is planning to develop some property holdings in Orange and Los Angeles counties for residential, commercial, and recreation uses while setting aside large portions of its property as natural open space. The company calls this initiative Brea 265, which aims to develop former oil fields into residential areas.

The master planned community of Vista Del Verde, Aera's first real estate development, followed the decommissioning and cleanup of the 850-acre (3.4 km^{2}) Yorba Linda oil field. The community includes housing, parks, an elementary school, and a city-owned golf course, Black Gold Golf Club. As part of the development, Aera added more than 1,000 acres (4.0 km^{2}) of adjacent, company-owned land to the Chino Hills State Park, and provided funding for the restoration, enhancement, and maintenance of native habitats within the park.

Two additional real estate projects are being planned. The Aera Master Planned Community would develop approximately 3,000 acres (12 km^{2}) of company-owned land in unincorporated Los Angeles and Orange counties, approximately where the county line intersects the Orange Freeway (SR-57). Part of the larger Brea-Olinda Oil Field, the property has been used for oil operations dating back to the 1890s and cattle grazing operations since the 1850s. Aera is pursuing approvals to develop this property for residential and commercial uses while devoting more than 1,500 acres (6.1 km^{2}) to recreation uses and open space restoration. The project will also preserve and enhance a wildlife corridor to improve regional open space connectivity.

Aera owns a 50 percent interest in approximately 400 acres (1.6 km^{2}) known as the Newport Banning Ranch property on the western edge of the city of Newport Beach. Aera is a participant in Newport Banning Ranch, LLC, which has submitted a proposal to build 1,375 homes, parks, a coastal inn, and a small commercial center on about 153 acres (0.62 km^{2}) of the site, while preserving and restoring more than 55 percent of the property for open space and wildlife habitat uses. The project would remove oil facilities and restore the surface of most of the oil operations areas on the property, consolidating the remaining oil operations to two sites totaling about 20 acres (81,000 m^{2}).

== Lawsuits ==
A lawsuit, filed October 2001, alleged Aera Energy allowed 600 million barrels of oil wastewater to seep into the subsurface aquifers of the Starrh Farms after putting oil drilling waste into a mile of unlined percolation ponds near the farm. In 2004, a Kern County Superior Court jury awarded the Fred Starrh family more than $7 million, though they originally sought $3 to $4 billion for damages and cleanup. Both sides appealed to the California Court of Appeal, Fifth District. The Court granted a partial directed verdict and ordered a new trial. In 2009, Starrh refiled the lawsuit in the Kern County Superior Court. There were two subsequent jury trials, in 2009 and 2013. Aera Energy was found liable and ordered to pay $9 million.

Aera Energy is also involved in a legal tussle with the state of California over its de facto ban on fracking, an oil field extraction technique. In 2021, Aera filed a lawsuit against the state after it denied 49 of its fracking permit applications based on climate change concerns.

== Awards ==
In 2002 Aera's Belridge Producing Complex won the prestigious North American Maintenance Excellence (NAME) Award for its maintenance and reliability program and results. ^{8} In 2004 Aera's North Midway Sunset Unit was awarded a NAME Award.^{8} Aera is the first oil exploration and production company to win the award previously given only to manufacturing organizations. In 2011 Aera's development team was awarded the Association for Manufacturing Excellence (AME) Manufacturing Excellence Award. Aera is the first energy company to receive the award.^{9}

== In popular culture ==
Aera Energy is depicted as "Shore Oil" in the 2019 American film, The Devil Has a Name, inspired by true events depicted in the pollution lawsuits by Starrh Farms.
