= Lompoc Oil Field =

Oil field in California, United States

Coordinates: 34.7287°N 120.4375°W

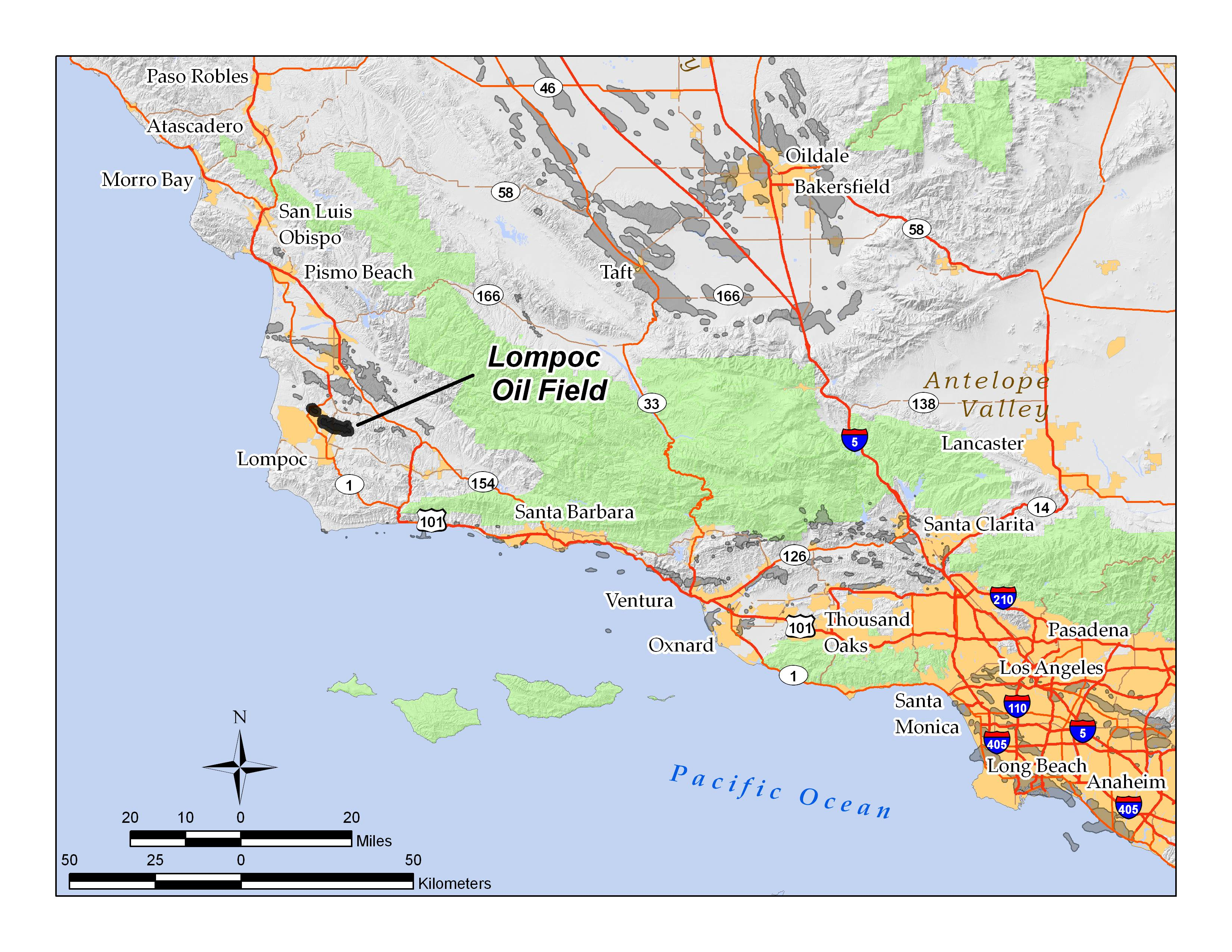
Location of the Lompoc Oil Field in southern and central California. Other oil fields are shown in dark gray.

The Lompoc Oil Field is a large oil field in the Purisima Hills north of Lompoc, California, in Santa Barbara County. Discovered in 1903, two years after the discovery of the Orcutt Oil Field in the Solomon Hills, it is one of the oldest oil fields in northern Santa Barbara County, and one of the closest to exhaustion, reporting only 1.7 million barrels (270,000 m^{3}) of recoverable oil remaining out of its original 50 million barrels (7,900,000 m^{3}) as of the end of 2008. Its sole operator is Sentinel Peak Resources, who acquired it from Freeport-McMoRan. In 2009, the proposed decommissioning and habitat restoration of the 3,700-acre (15 km^{2}) field was part of a controversial and so-far unsuccessful deal between Plains, several environmental groups, Santa Barbara County, and the State of California, to allow Plains to carry out new offshore oil drilling on the Tranquillon Ridge, in the Pacific Ocean about twenty miles (32 km) southwest of the Lompoc field.

== Setting ==
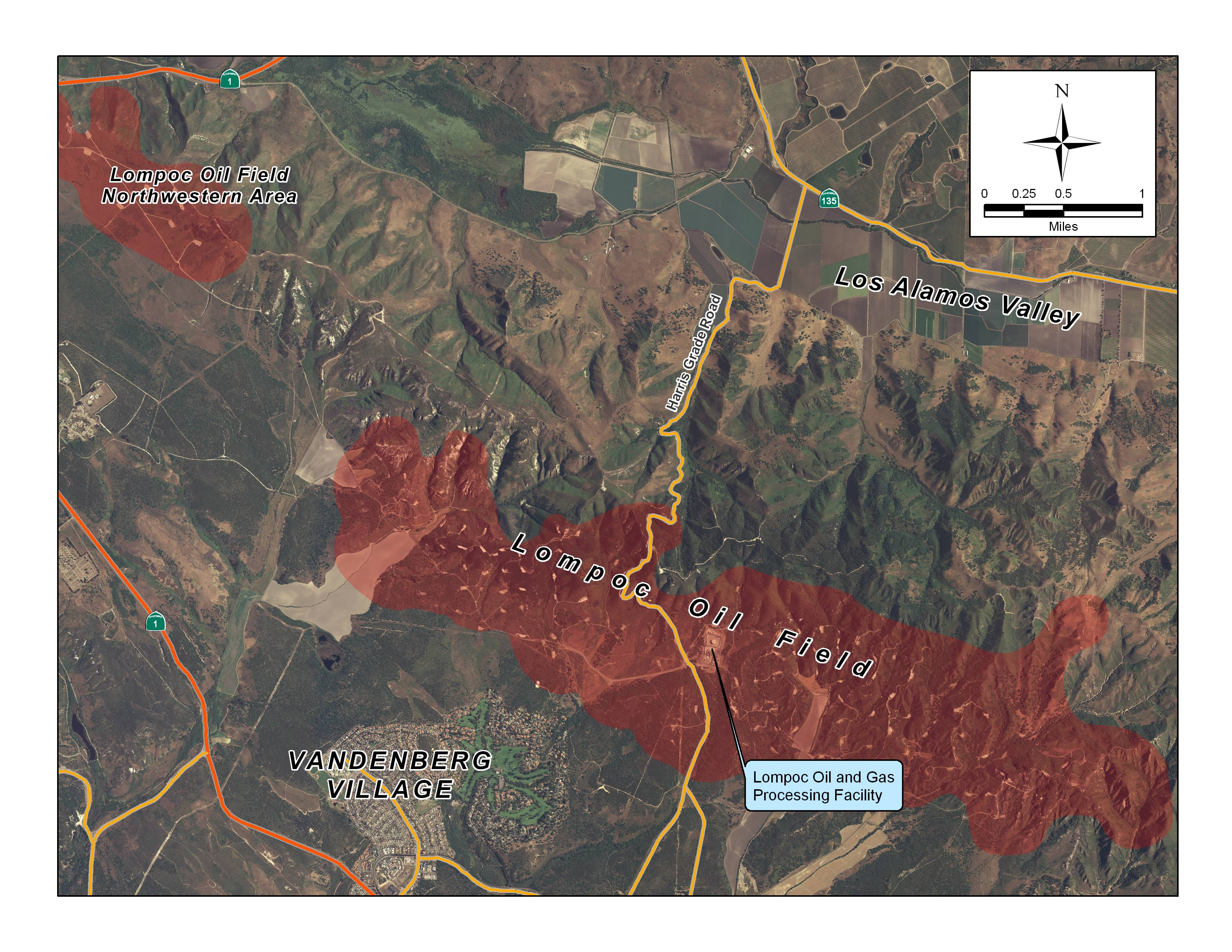
Detail of the Lompoc field, showing Vandenberg Village to the south and the Los Alamos Valley to the north.

The Lompoc field follows the line of the Purisima Hills, a northwest-to-southeast trending range dividing the Santa Ynez Valley on the south from the Los Alamos Valley to the north, and the field is about five miles (8.0 km) long by one-half to one mile (0.80 to 1.61 km) across. The hills are a part of the Burton Mesa region, much of which is an ecological reserve maintained by the California Department of Fish and Game. Populated places close to the field include Vandenberg Village and Lompoc to the south, Vandenberg Space Force Base to the west, and Los Alamos to the east. One public road, Harris Grade Road, traverses the field from north to south. Several access points to the field are along this road. Most of the field's productive area, and most of the oil wells, are on the southern slope of the hills. Elevations on the oil field range from around 400 feet (120 m) on the west to 1,242 feet (379 m) at the summit of the Purisima Hills.

Climate in the region is Mediterranean, with cool, rainy winters and dry summers during which the heat is greatly diminished by fog and northwesterly winds from the cold waters of the Pacific Ocean, which is about 12 miles (19 km) west of the field. Prevailing winds year-round are from the west-northwest. The north slopes of the hills contain stands of bishop pine as well as coast live oak forest; the south-facing slopes have mostly chaparral vegetation types, including coastal sage scrub. fourteen inches (36 cm) of rain falls in a typical winter. Drainage on the south side of the hills is to the Santa Ynez River, and then out to the sea via Lompoc; to the north, runoff goes to San Antonio Creek, which exits to the ocean through Vandenberg Space Force Base.

A small discontiguous part of the field, the Northwest Area, is situated about a mile and a half northwest of the main part of the field, close to the main gate of Vandenberg Space Force Base. As of 2009, that area had 9 actively producing wells, as well as three used for water disposal.

== Geology ==
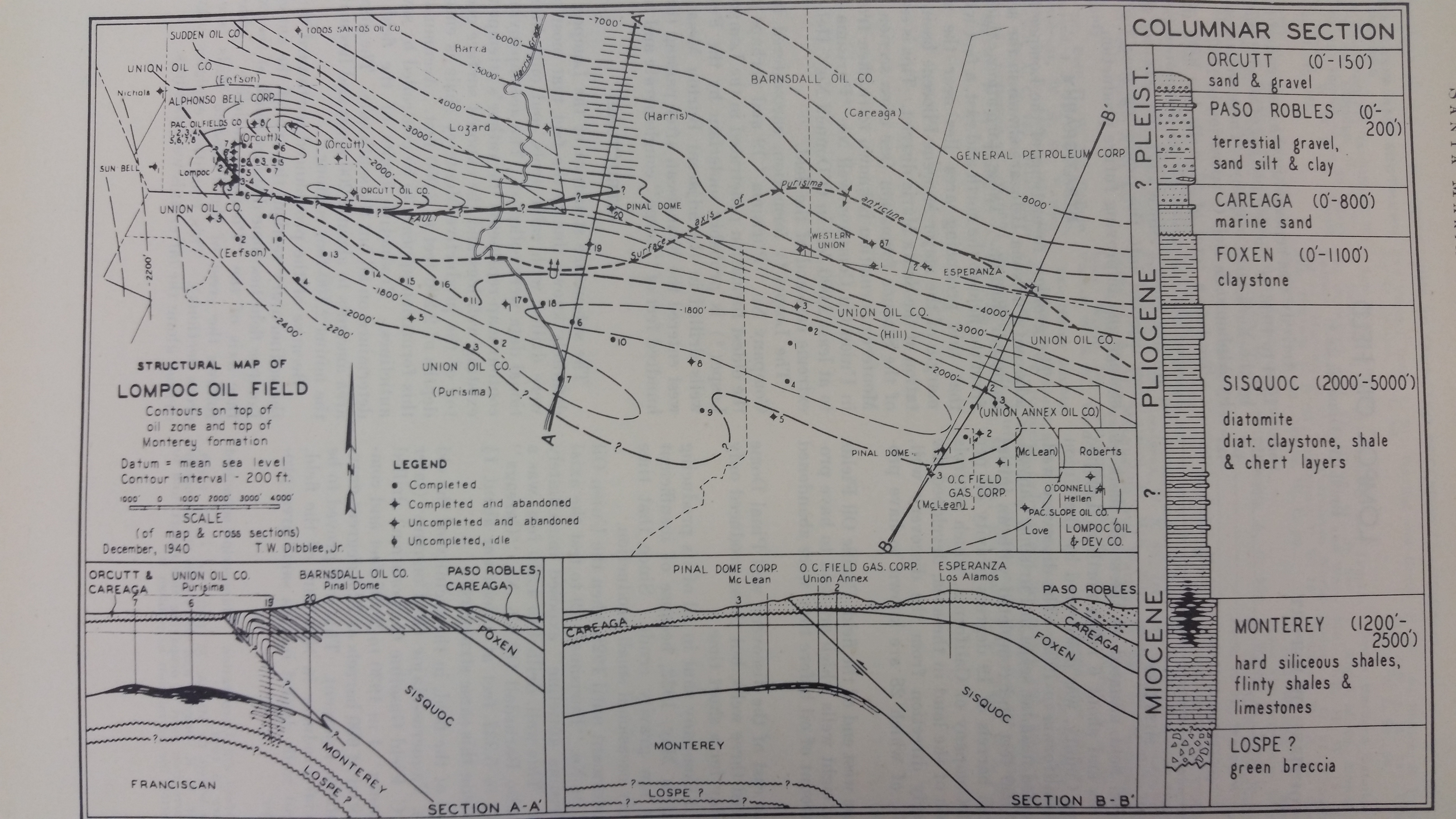
Lompoc Oil Field Structure Map

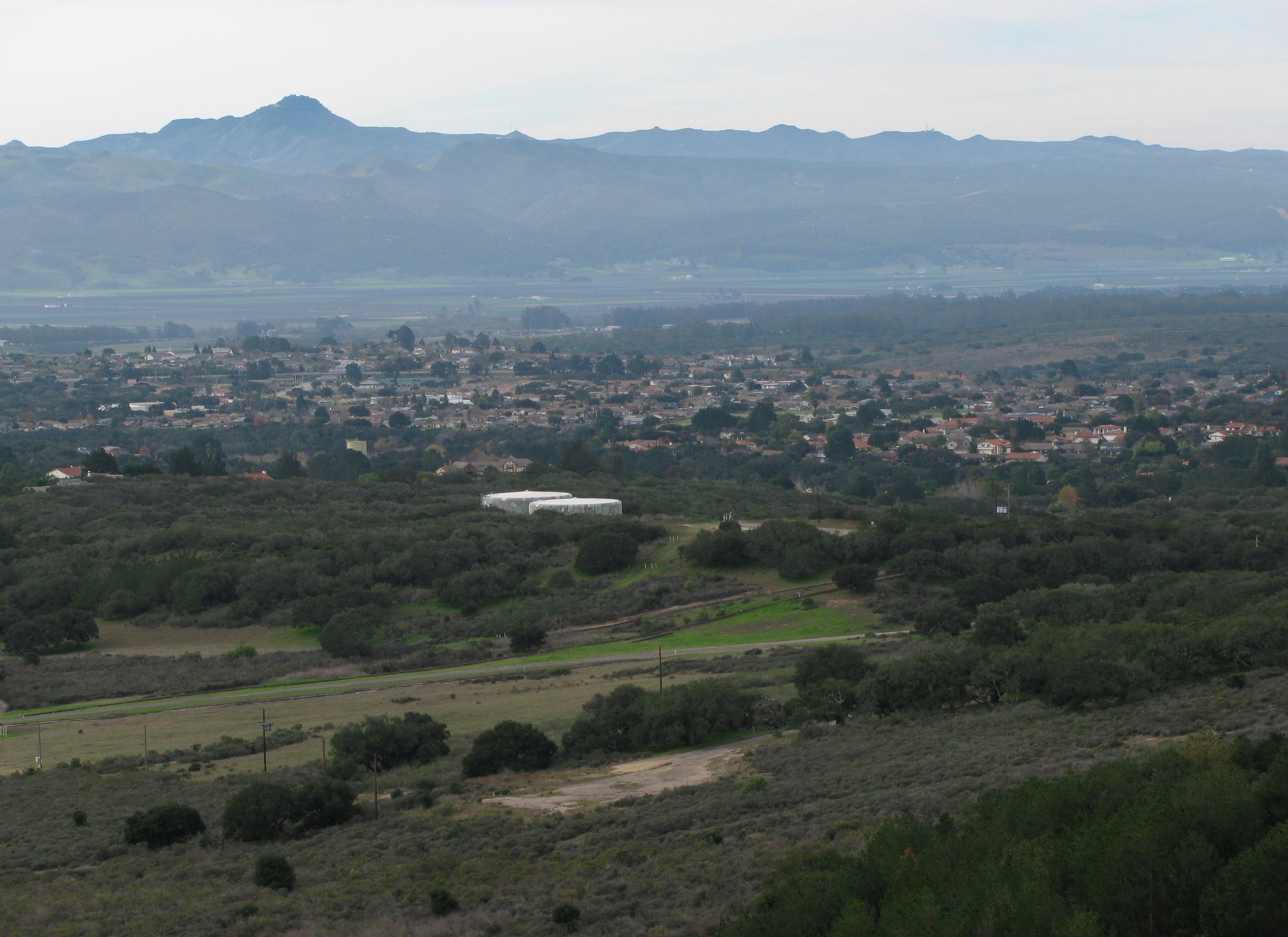
View from Harris Grade Road within the Lompoc Oil Field, south towards Vandenberg Village. The two storage tanks in the middle distance are on the field.

The hills are the surface expression of an anticlinal structure consisting of the adjacent Lompoc Anticline and the Purisima Anticline, which are offset from each other by faults. The surface Paso Robles and Careaga formations are Pleistocene sediments. Underneath them is the relatively impermeable Sisquoc Formation, of Pliocene and Miocene age. Beneath this unit, and separated by an unconformity, is the oil-bearing rock, the fractured shale of the Miocene-age Monterey Formation, at the top of which oil has pooled, halted in its upward migration by the impermeable cap of the Sisquoc. The minimum depth at which oil has been recovered in the Lompoc field is approximately 2,250 feet (690 m), and the average net thickness of the oil-bearing rock is 450 to 500 feet (150 m). Total productive area of the field is 2,350 acres (9.5 km^{2}).

In the main part of the Lompoc field oil is medium grade, with an API gravity of 15 to 26; in the Northwest Area it is heavier and more viscous, with a gravity of 17 to 19.5. Only one pool or producing horizon has been defined, the "Monterey", discovered in 1903 and still producing as of 2009. The discontiguous Northwest Area also produces from the Monterey, but at a depth of approximately 2,700 feet (820 m), and with a net thickness of 280 feet (85 m).

== History, operations, and production ==
With the success of the drilling in the Los Angeles Basin around 1900, and similar discoveries of oil in Kern County around the same time, prospecting for oil began to occur in Santa Barbara County as well. In 1901 the Orcutt field was discovered, and in 1903 the discovery well for the Lompoc field was drilled, after several failed attempts to find oil in the obviously promising anticlinal structure. A 1902 well was wrecked in an earthquake before it found oil. The discovery well, by the Union Oil Company of California, hit oil in March 1903, and initially produced 225 barrels per day (35.8 m^{3}/d). By 1911, the field had 33 producing wells on the field, six in the process of being drilled, and 15 had already been abandoned, either as dry holes or insufficient producers. Union Oil Company of California's 1905 Well, Hill 4 was the first oil well in which a shutoff was attained by pumping cement through the tubing and back of the casing.

Peak production on the field did not occur until 1951, during which the operators reported almost 2.5 million barrels (400,000 m^{3}) of oil. An enhanced recovery project – gas injection to increase reservoir pressure – which had commenced in 1929 was discontinued in 1960, and production from the field continued to decline.

However the field was not played out. In 1983, Unocal discovered the Northwest Area, a small but productive region about a mile and a half northwest of the main part of the field, following the anticlinal trend of the hills, on the Jesus Maria lease. They reached peak production of 210,000 barrels (33,000 m^{3}) of oil from this area in 1989. However, interest in oil drilling in California had been moving offshore, particularly for the major oil companies, who had the resources to build offshore platforms and invest large sums of money in long-term prospects which had considerably greater reserves than the mature and declining onshore fields. Unocal, the operator of the Lompoc field as well as several others in the Santa Maria area, chose the Lompoc field as a central location to build an oil and gas processing plant, while maintaining operations as the production declined.

In 1986 the Santa Barbara County Board of Supervisors approved a request by Unocal, after an extensive environmental review, to develop an offshore oil platform in Federal waters (Platform Irene), a series of pipelines connecting it to a proposed new oil processing facility on the grounds of the Lompoc Oil Field. The plant was built shortly after, and went online in 1987.

Unocal divested most of its California assets in February 1996, selling them to Nuevo Energy. Plains acquired the field in 2002 with its purchase of Nuevo Energy, and continues to operate it as of the beginning of 2010. The Lompoc field was one of the properties transferred, along with the Lompoc Oil and Gas Plant, which then became, and remains, the principal processing plant for Plains's operations in the region. A total of 34 oil wells continued to pump from the field at the beginning of 2009, including 8 in the Northwest Area. Several others were used for water injection – primarily of produced water from offshore Platform Irene, as the most convenient disposal for this otherwise unusable water is to reinject it into the geologic formations which once contained petroleum.

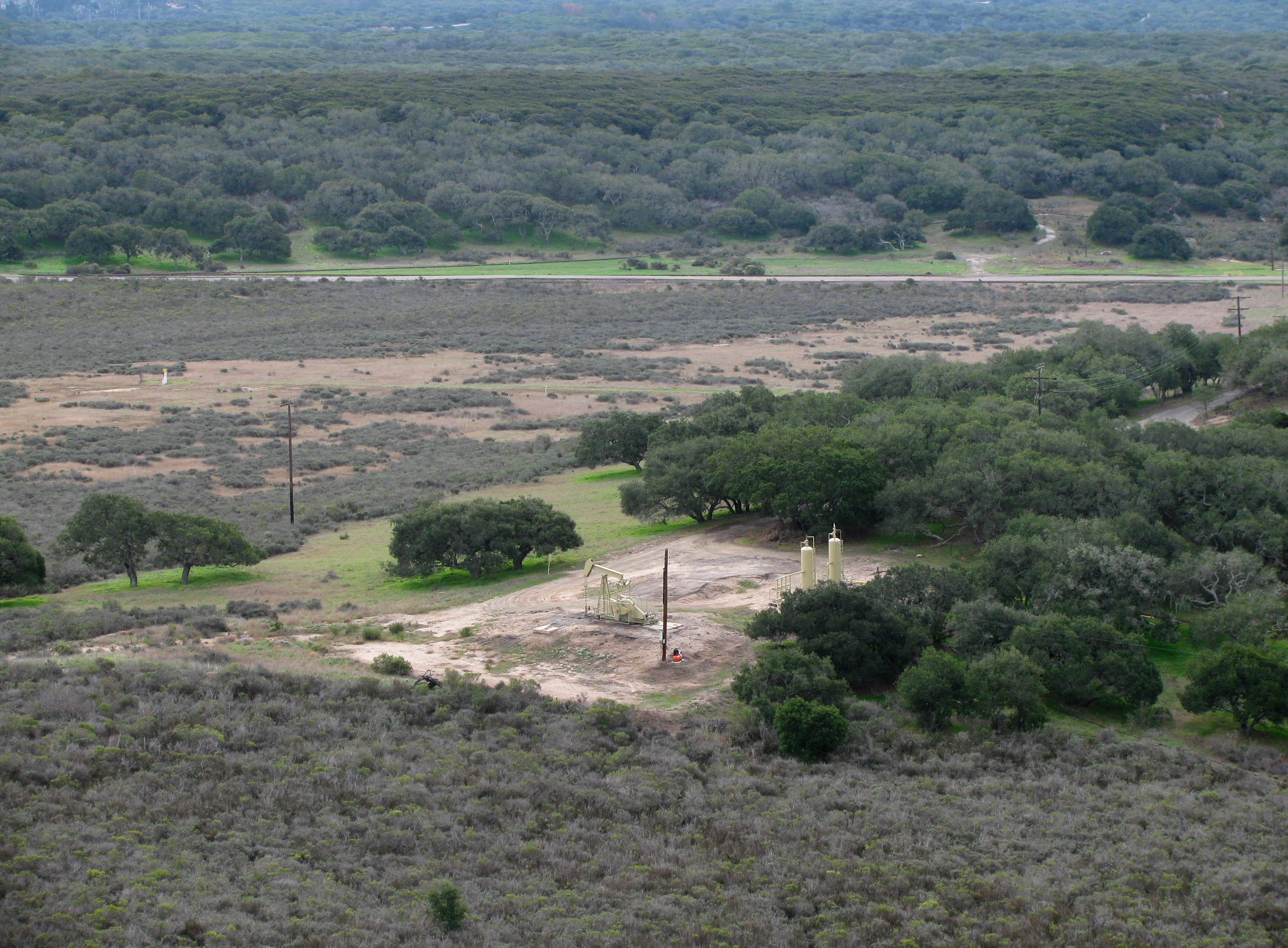
A solitary Plains pumpjack on the Lompoc field. Under the terms of the Tranquillon Ridge deal, this and the adjacent area would be converted to protected open space, effectively increasing the area of the Burton Mesa Ecological Reserve, the wooded area in the background, by 3,700 acres.

As part of a deal with various environmental groups, including the Santa Barbara-based Environmental Defense Center and Get Oil Out!, both venerable opponents of the oil industry in California, Plains offered to decommission the entire Lompoc Field in 2022, donating it as a permanent public nature preserve, in return for being able to slant drill from its existing Platform Irene in Federal waters into the previously untapped Tranquillon Ridge field, in state waters close to shore. Under the terms of the deal, oil produced at Platform Irene from the new field would be pumped to shore through existing pipelines and treated at the Lompoc Oil and Gas Processing plant. Platform Irene, the Lompoc Field, and the Processing Plant would be shut down by 2022, and in the meantime the state would have received approximately $2 billion in tax revenues, while Santa Barbara County would have gotten $350 million. The deal was defeated by a 2–1 vote of the State Lands Commission on January 29, 2009, who cited the unenforceability of the sunset clause.

Freeport McMoRan Oil and Gas acquired the operations in the field with their 2013 purchase of Plains Exploration & Production
