= Orcutt Oil Field =

Oil field in California, US

Coordinates: 34.8241°N 120.4059°W

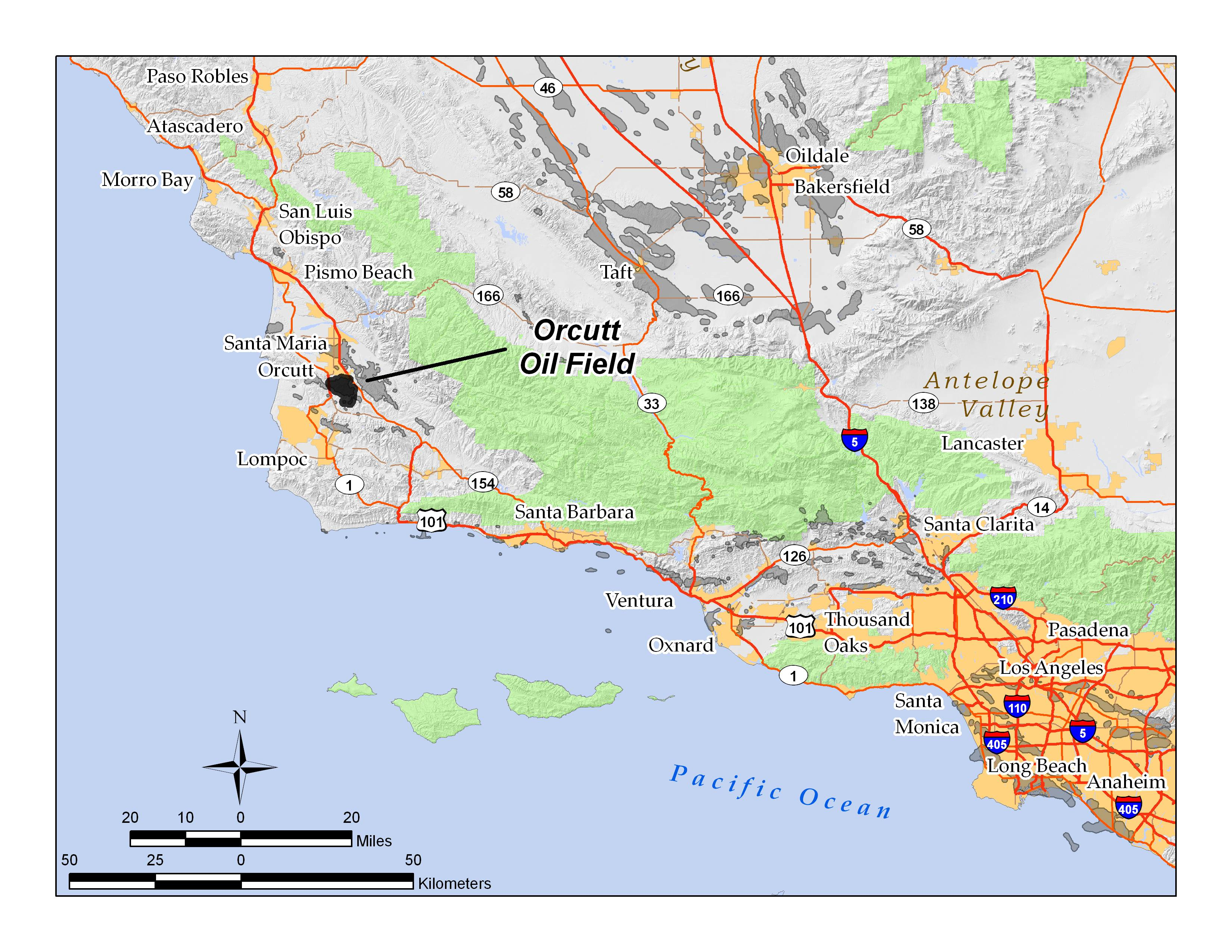
Location of the Orcutt Oil Field in southern and central California. Other oil fields are shown in dark gray.

The Orcutt Oil Field is a large oil field in the Solomon Hills south of Orcutt, in Santa Barbara County, California, United States. Discovered in 1901 by William Warren Orcutt, it was the first giant field (over 100 million barrels (16,000,000 m^{3}) in ultimate recovery) to be found in Santa Barbara County, and its development led to the boom town of Orcutt, now the major unincorporated southern suburb of Santa Maria. With a cumulative production in 2008 of 870,000 barrels (138,000 m^{3}) of oil, it is the largest onshore producing field in Santa Barbara County.

The Orcutt field was called the "Santa Maria Field" until the discovery of the larger Santa Maria Valley Oil Field on the plain to the north, an area which is now largely covered with the urban and suburban development. Several oil companies, including Pacific Coast Energy Company (PCEC) and Phoenix Energy, LLC are still actively producing from the Orcutt field. The field, mostly located on the old Careaga family ranch, also contains the remains of the ghost town of Bicknell, a company town built for oil workers in the early years of the 20th century, but abandoned in the mid-1930s.

== Setting ==
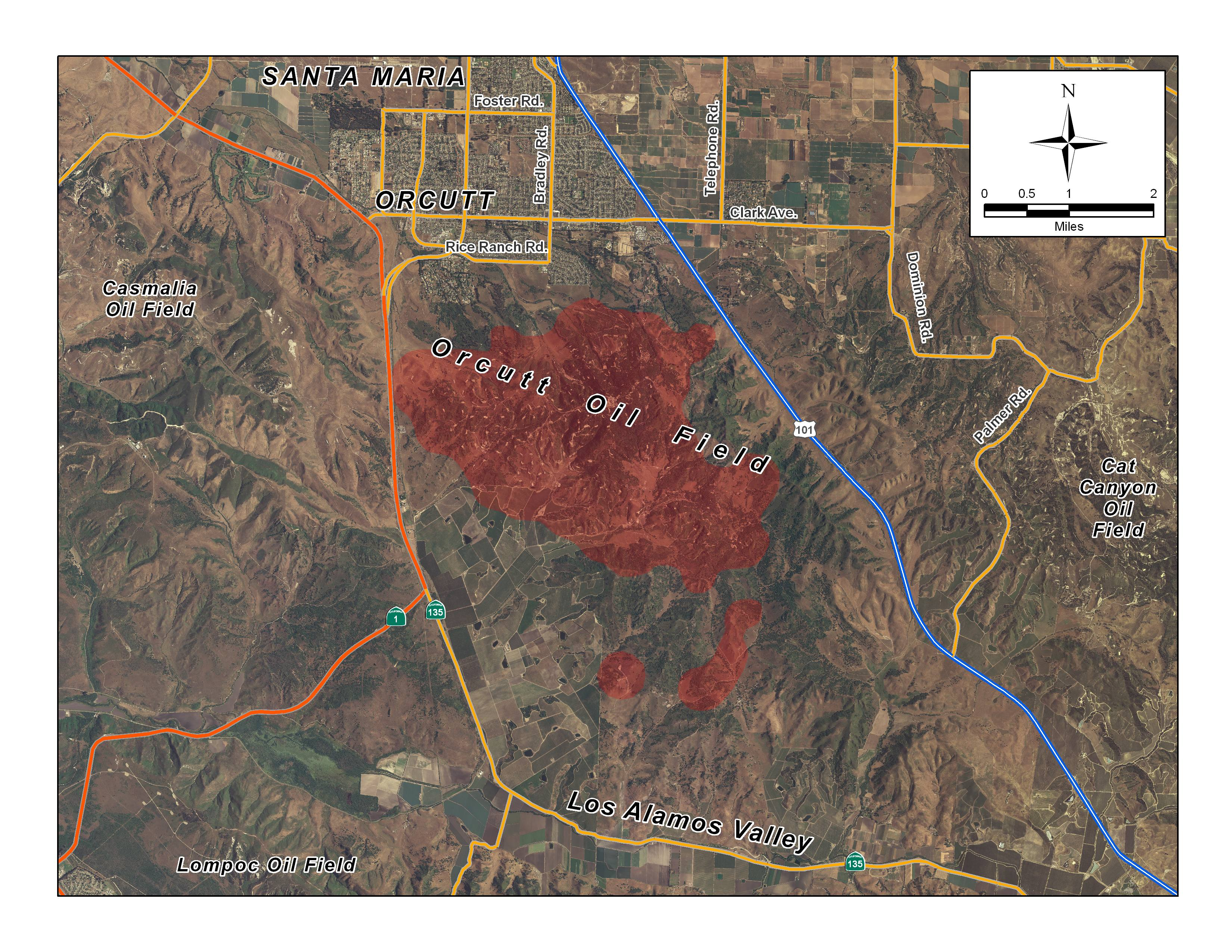
Detail of the Orcutt field, showing adjacent highways and the town of Orcutt to the north.

The Orcutt field occupies a large portion of the Solomon Hills and Careaga canyon south of Orcutt, including most of the otherwise undeveloped land between Highway 101 on the east and State Route 135 on the west. Its total productive area is 4,220 acres (17.1 km^{2}), almost 7 square miles (18 km^{2}). Most of the active oilfield operations are invisible from the populated parts of the Santa Maria Valley, as the wells, tanks, and other facilities are behind the Graciosa Ridge, which rises to 1,346 feet (410 m) elevation at Mount Solomon, and the most active part of the field in 2009 was on the south slope of the range. There are no public roads entering the field.

Terrain is rolling and occasionally steep, with wellpads cut into hillsides or occupying flat areas. Native vegetation is a mix of chaparral and oak woodlands (California montane chaparral and woodlands), with some stands of Bishop pine (Pinus muricata) on north-facing slopes.

The region has a Mediterranean climate, with cool and rainy winters, and dry summers during which the heat is greatly diminished by fog and northwesterly winds from the cold waters of the Pacific Ocean, which is about 15 miles (24 km) west of the field. Prevailing winds year-round are from the west-northwest. Approximately 14 inches (36 cm) of rain falls in a typical winter, with the rainy season lasting from around November to April. Drainage on the south side of the hills is down Harris Canyon, Long Canyon, and Careaga Canyon, to San Antonio Creek, which exits to the ocean through Vandenberg Air Force Base. Drainage to the north is to Orcutt Creek, which passes Old Town Orcutt on the north on its way to its juncture with the Santa Maria River and the Pacific Ocean near Guadalupe.

== Geology ==
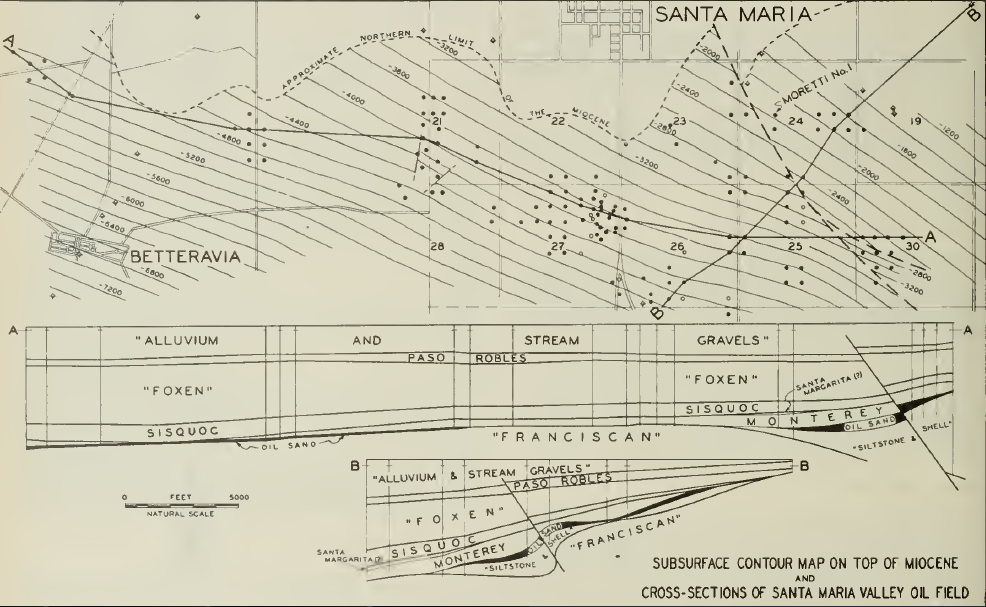
Santa Maria Valley Oil Field Structure Map, 1943

The Orcutt field is one of several along the Casmalia-Orcutt Anticline, one of several anticlinal structures in the region along which oil fields are found, with the Solomon Hills being the surface expression of this anticline. In the Orcutt field, oil has pooled in a dome-like structure bounded on the north by the Orcutt Fault and on the southwest by the Casmalia Fault, at a minimum depth of 900 feet (270 m) in a diatomite formation. The deepest oil-producing horizon was not discovered until 1981, and yields oil from about 9,300 feet (2,800 m) below ground surface.

The capping geologic units are the Sisquoc, Careaga, and Foxen formations. The Careaga and Foxen are of Pliocene age, while the thicker, diatomaceous Sisquoc is both Pliocene and Upper Miocene. Beneath these, separated by an unconformity, is the fractured shale of the Monterey Formation which has been richly productive for over 100 years. This is the same producing formation as in many other California oil fields, including the Lompoc Oil Field in the similarly anticlinal ridge of the Purisima Hills to the south, and the Zaca field to the southeast.

Oil from the field is heavy in the main Monterey producing horizon, with API gravity of 14-17. The Point Sal, discovered in 1905 at a depth of 2,700 feet (820 m), has lighter oil, with gravity 22-24. Some of the more recently discovered deep horizons, such as the Lospe in the Careaga Area, or the Deep Monterey in the field's Main Area, are lighter yet. These two pools were discovered in 1985 and 1981, respectively.

== History, operations, and production ==
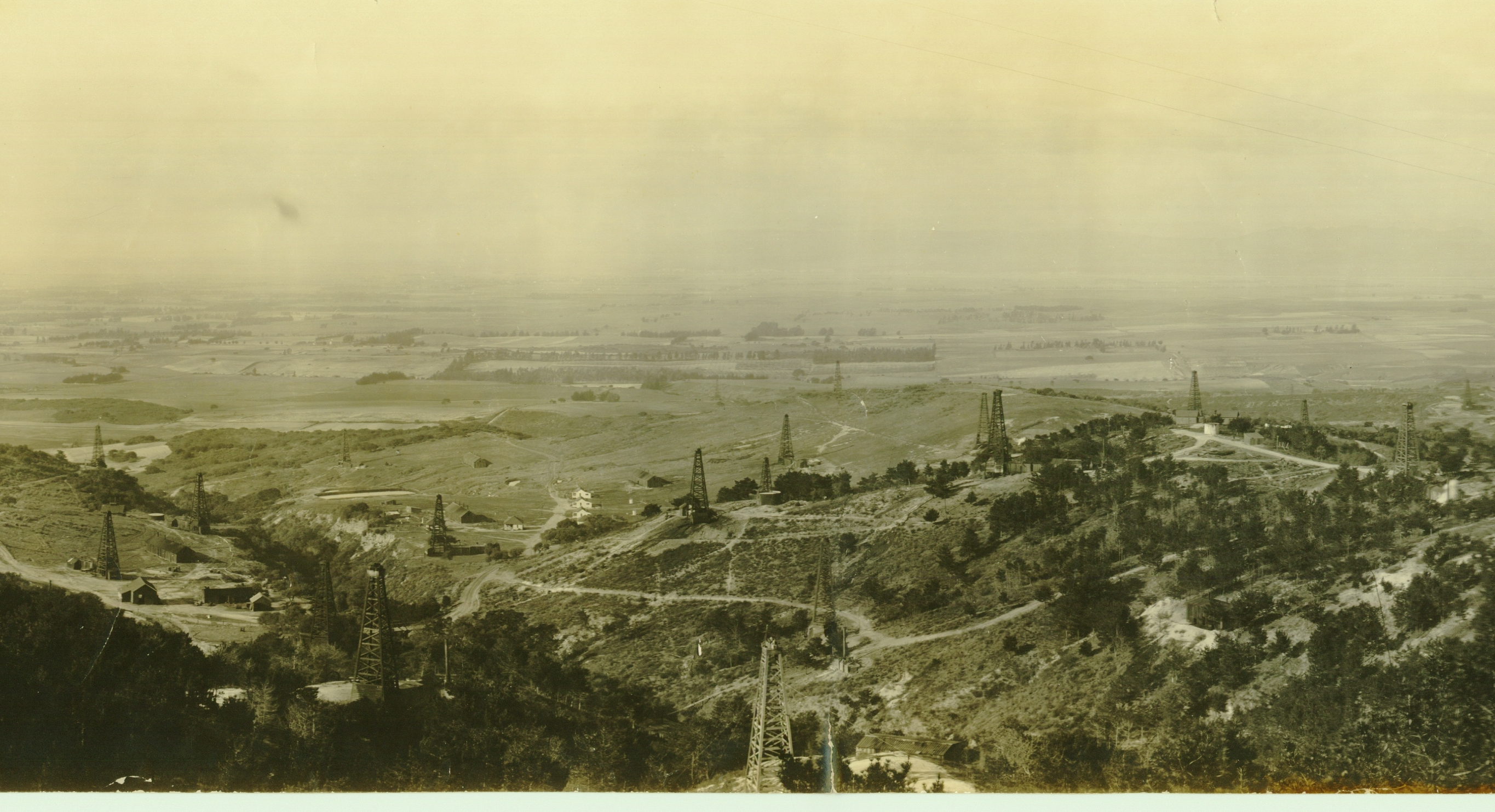
Orcutt field, looking north from the Solomon Hills. Detail of a panorama; around 1910.

Prospectors long suspected the presence of oil in the Santa Maria Valley and surrounding hills, but the late 19th-century attempts to find it were either shallow or misplaced. Union Oil Co. geologist William Warren Orcutt, for whom the town is named, was tasked by Union Oil to survey the area in 1901. Orcutt came back with a report that made Union Oil aggressive in the area. Following his report, the company leased around 70,000 acres (280 km^{2}) in the valley and vicinity, including the hills, and began drilling. In October 1901, their third well on the Careaga lease came in at 150 barrels per day (24 m^{3}/d), beginning the field's long history.

The most productive well of all, and one of the most productive in the history of the industry, was the result of an accident. In 1904 a drilling crew was transporting their equipment to a pre-determined location, but a road accident on the way upended the boiler they had been carrying. Rather than putting the rig back together and continuing, they decided to make their work easier and drill on the spot. It turned out to be a good idea. "Old Maud", as the well became known, came in as a spectacular gusher, producing 12,000 barrels per day (1,900 m^{3}/d) and flooding a canyon with oil as crews struggled to contain tens of thousands of barrels of black goo running downhill by hurriedly constructing earthen dams. This well was the largest oil producer on the continent up until this time, with Spindletop in Texas being a close second. It produced over 2 million barrels (320,000 m^{3}) in its long history, not being plugged and abandoned until 1988. The origin of the name "Old Maud" has not been definitively determined; some sources attribute it to the name of a mule, others to a favored town prostitute.

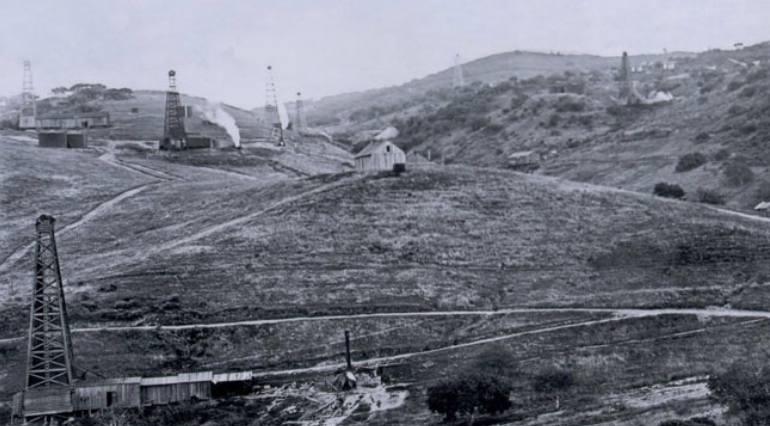
Orcutt Oil Field (Early 1900’s)

Peak oil production from the Orcutt field – or the Santa Maria field as it was known then – occurred early, in 1908, at 8.7 million barrels (1,380,000 m^{3}) in that year. By this year the boom town of Orcutt, built to house the oilfield workers, already had approximately 1,000 residents, along with saloons, hotels, and restaurants. Production from the field began to slow after the peak, and in the late 1920s Union Oil, which by then owned the majority of the field, cut production in half. During the boom period, Union Oil built a small company town on the field itself. Bicknell, which still appears on USGS topographic maps, was abandoned in the 1930s, with some of the houses themselves being moved down the hill to Orcutt. At its peak it included a post office, swimming pool, grocery store, and school house, in addition to over 900 residences. The school house is the solitary remaining building, and is currently in use by Pacific Coast Energy Company (PCEC), who operates much of the field.

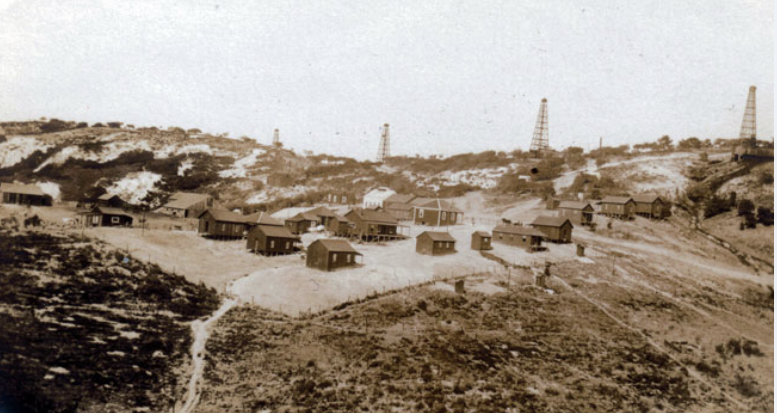
Town of Bicknell, 1900s

In 1947 the name of the field was changed officially from "Santa Maria" to "Orcutt", to differentiate it from the Santa Maria Valley field to the north, discovered in 1934.

Several enhanced recovery operations have been used on the field, beginning with waterflooding in 1951 (a technique of filling a depleting reservoir with wastewater, both to dispose of produced water and to increase reservoir pressure, allowing more oil to be pumped out). Both gas injection and alkaline flood operations have been used in the Point Sal horizon in the Main Area.

Unocal sold the field in the 1990s along with other assets in California. Other owners have included Nuevo Energy, who sold the field in 2003 to Energy Reserves Group LLC. This company operated the field for one year before selling to Breitburn Energy in 2004 for $46.7 million. Breitburn remains the largest operator on the field. Another operator active as of 2010 is Pacific Resources, LLC, a division of Santa Maria Pacific.

== See also ==
- Lompoc Oil Field
- Orcutt Ranch Horticulture Center
