= Careaga =

Careaga is a Spanish surname. Notable people with the surname include:

- Careaga family of California
- Antonio Menchaca Careaga (1921–2002), Spanish novelist and poet
- Alfredo Careaga (born 1942), Mexican engineer, physicist, mathematician, conservationist, and ecologist
- Domingo Careaga (1897–1947), Spanish footballer
- Enrique Careaga (1872–1936), Spanish engineer and footballer
- Federico Chaves Careaga (1882–1978), Paraguayan politician and soldier who served as President of Paraguay
- Javier Careaga (born 1967), Mexican former breaststroke swimmer Olympian
- Gabriel Careaga Medina (1941–2004), Spanish sociologist, academic, and essayist
- Gloria Careaga Pérez (born 1947), Mexican social psychologist and feminist
- Pilar Careaga (1908–1993) was a Spanish politician and industrial engineer. She was the first woman to be mayor
- Samuel Careaga (born 2002), Argentine footballer
