= Daisy Ryan =

American chef and restaurateur

- Born: Daisy Freitas; California
- Education: Culinary Institute of America
- Culinary career
- Rating: Michelin stars
- Current restaurant: Bell's
- Award won: Best New Chefs 2020, Food & Wine

Daisy Ryan is an American chef and restaurateur. Her restaurant, Bell's, in Los Alamos, California, was awarded a Michelin star in 2021. Food & Wine named her one of their Best New Chefs in 2020.

== Early life and education ==
Ryan grew up in the Santa Ynez Valley near Los Alamos, California and attended the Culinary Institute of America. Her parents, Brent and Suzi Freitas, owned a garden center.

== Career ==
After graduating from culinary school, Ryan was hired by Per Se into a front-of-house position. She worked at other New York City and Austin, Texas, restaurants. In 2014 she moved to Los Angeles with her husband and helped Roy Choi open a hotel and restaurant complex in Koreatown.

Ryan owns and operates Bell's, a bistro in Los Alamos, California, with her husband, Greg. The couple opened the restaurant in January 2018 with a goal of creating a restaurant that was not chef-driven but was focussed on diner experience. Ryan describes the restaurant's menus as "Franch", a portmanteau of French and ranch, meaning the dishes are French-inspired but more relaxed; the term also references the many ranches in the area which the restaurant showcases.

Ryan and her husband have helped incubate other food businesses in the Los Alamos area.

== Recognition ==
in 2020 Food & Wine named her one of their Best New Chefs. Bell's was named a Wine Spectator Aware of Excellence winner in 2020 and awarded a Michelin star in 2021. Ryan was named a semifinalist in the Best Chef:California category of the 2026 James Beard Awards.

== Personal life ==
Ryan met her husband in 2008 while they were both working at Per Se. The couple have a son born in 2017.
