= San Antonio Creek (Santa Barbara County, California) =

San Antonio Creek (Santa Barbara County, California) Arroyo De Los Alamos, Guaymas Creek, Guaymas River, Jesus Maria Creek, Jesus Maria River, Los Alamos Creek

Location
- Country: United States
- State: California
- Region: Santa Barbara County
- City: Los Alamos, California

Physical characteristics
- Source
  - location: Solomon Hills
  - coordinates: 34°44′50″N 120°08′17″W
  - elevation: 1,400 ft (430 m)
- Mouth: Pacific Ocean
  - coordinates: 34°48′00″N 120°37′16″W
  - elevation: 7 ft (2.1 m)

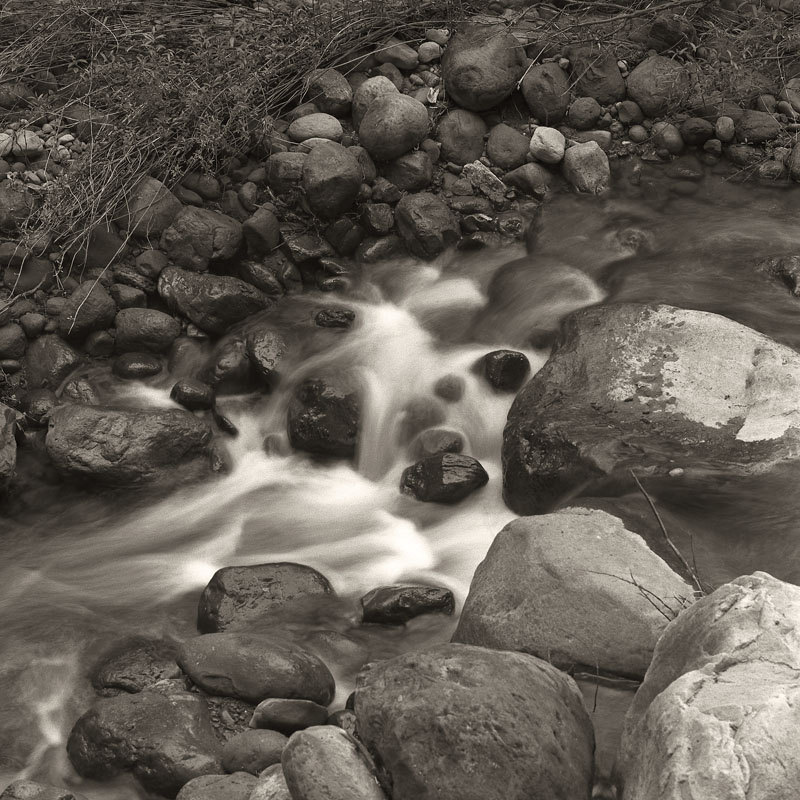
San Antonio Creek

San Antonio Creek is a creek flowing from the Solomon Hills to the Pacific Ocean, located in Santa Barbara County, California.

== Course ==
The creek originates about 10 miles (16 km) east of Los Alamos in the Solomon Hills. It flows westerly from the hills, through the Los Alamos Valley, the Barka Slough, and the San Antonio Valley, to its river mouth north of Purisima Point on the Pacific coast. It passes through the town of Los Alamos, California and downstream flows through Vandenberg Space Force Base.

=== Water ===
The lower course through Vandenberg SFB has a perennial flow, in part because of irrigation tailwater, but primarily because of a geologic rift at Barka Slough which causes an upwelling.

The principal crops grown within its watershed are vegetables in the flat fields, and winegrapes in the transitional upland slopes. All are irrigated from groundwater aquifer resources. In 1996 almost all of the water supply used by Vandenberg AFB was pumped from the San Antonio Aquifer. 36% of the San Antonio Creek Hydrological Unit is within Vandenberg.

== Ecology ==
West of Barca Slough, San Antonio Creek is inhabited by the endangered Unarmored Three-spined stickleback (Gasterosteus aculeatus williamsoni) which, for all practical purposes, prohibits any stream maintenance. The endangered Tidewater goby (Eucyclogobius newberryi) is also found in the creek's brackish coastal lagoon and several miles upstream in sections of stream impounded by California Golden beavers (Castor canadensis subauratus) which provide ideal slow-moving water habitat for gobies.

San Antonio Creek, from Rancho del las Flores Bridge at State Highway 135 to the Railroad Bridge downstream, is impaired from boron, ammonia, and nitrite pollution.

== History ==
The first European land exploration of Alta California, the Spanish Portolà expedition, camped near the creek on August 31, 1769. Franciscan missionary Juan Crespi noted in his diary that they found "a large pond of fresh water" which has since mostly filled in, leaving a series of small ponds and marshy areas upstream of the creek mouth (Barka Slough).

When Mission La Purisima was established in 1787, the San Antonio Creek area became part of the mission's pasture land. In 1837, following secularization of the mission, the area became part of the Rancho Lompoc Mexican land grant.

== See also ==
- La Purisima Mission State Historic Park
- Rivers of Santa Barbara County, California
- Tidewater goby
- California Fur Rush
