= 1880 Union Hotel =

Historic hotel and saloon in Los Alamos, California, United States

Coordinates: 34.7438°N 120.2803°W

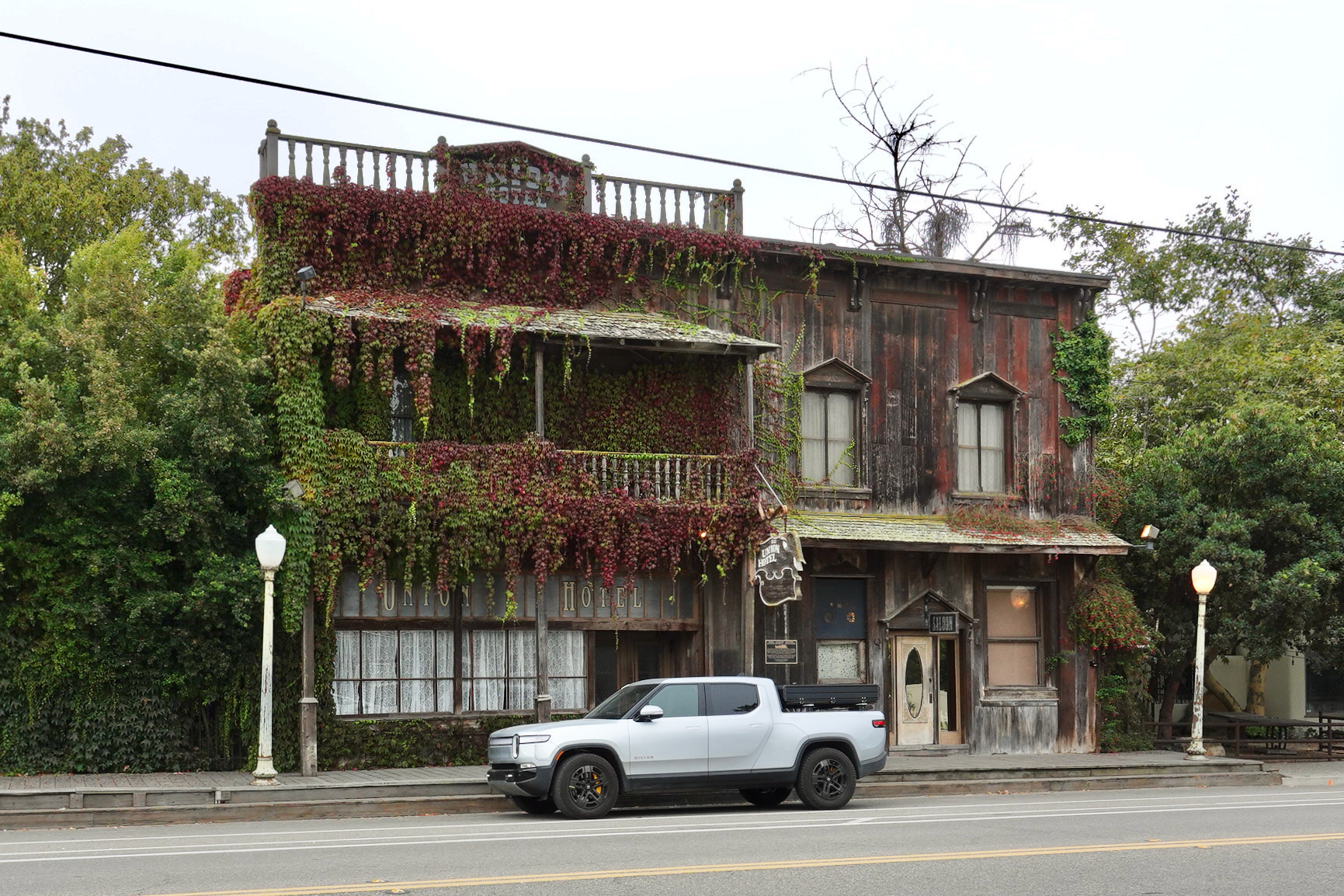
- 1880 Union Hotel in October 2025
- Type: Hotel, saloon
- Location: Los Alamos, California
- Founder: J.D. Snyder
- Built: 1880
- Rebuilt: 1915

The 1880 Union Hotel, located in Los Alamos, California, is a hotel and saloon and an historic landmark.

== History ==
It was constructed in 1880 by Wells Fargo agent J. D. Snyder as a telegraph office and Wells Fargo stagecoach stop. It was a telegraph station, a showroom and a hotel for traveling salesmen. It burned down on February 16, 1893. Rebuilt in 1915 by J. P. Loustalot, it then serviced stagecoach and early railroad passengers with food, drink and lodging.

Johnny Cash sang at the hotel in the 1950s. It was named Santa Barbara County Landmark #39 on December 13, 1998. In 1972, then owner Dick Langdon restored the 1880 Union to its original condition.

== Modern use ==
It was the site of the music video "Say Say Say" by Michael Jackson and Paul McCartney, released in 1983. It served wine from actor Kurt Russell. It now operates as a hotel, saloon and event venue with 14 rooms and the look of the Old West.

The saloon includes only three wine labels, including Kurt Russell's Gogi Wines, Ampelos and Kate Hudson and Matt Bellamy's Hudson-Bellamy rose.
