= Careaga family of California =

Californio family of Central California

The Careaga family is a Californio family of Central California.

== History ==
Colonel Satornino Careaga was the first of the family to immigrate to California. He was son of Sinforiano Careaga, a Spanish nobleman descended from the famous Captain Juan de Careaga (of the Vizcayan Armada) and later sent to Mexico as a military man by the King of Spain. He was a member of Captain Muñoz's command who risked his life and suffered great pains to protect an exposed and seemingly doomed San Jose Mission. He was survived by two sons, Ramon Francis Careaga and Juan B. Careaga. Along with a mutual friend, Daniel Harris, the brothers bought approximately 18,000 acres (73 km^{2}) of land formerly belonging to the De la Guerra family (early Spaniards who figured prominently in the state history). Later, in the division, Harris took some 7,500 acres (30 km^{2}) while the Careaga brothers held 10,500. This land was later split again in a settlement between Juan's only progeny and the five children of Ramon F Careaga I. It was on Ramon Careaga's land that oil from the Orcutt Oil Field was first discovered in the Santa Maria Valley. There are several ancestors of Ramon F Careaga that still receive minor oil royalties, but since 1931, the Ramon F Careaga III lineage was not compensated, due to his selling the rights back to his mother, Cora.

The land was all sold away in a forced settlement initiated by lawsuit from Charles Careaga in 1962, that finally finished with the death of Albert Careaga in 1992. The Careaga Ranch/Los Flores Preserve is currently owned and utilized by Steve Lyons, and the Santa Barbara Land Trust.

== Alternate name spellings ==
The alternate spellings of the esteemed surname is "Kareaga," "Carreaga", "Carriaga", or "Cariaga." It is derived from the Spanish "kare" (lime) and "aga" (place), thus seems to refer to a "limy place." Several medieval estates of the family's continue to exist in Spain today, including two located in Markina-Xemein and Murelaga. The family coat of arms is distinguishable by its gold and silver tones as well as two wolves of saber.

== See also ==
- List of Californios people
