= Los Alamos, California =

Los Alamos
- Unincorporated community Census-designated place
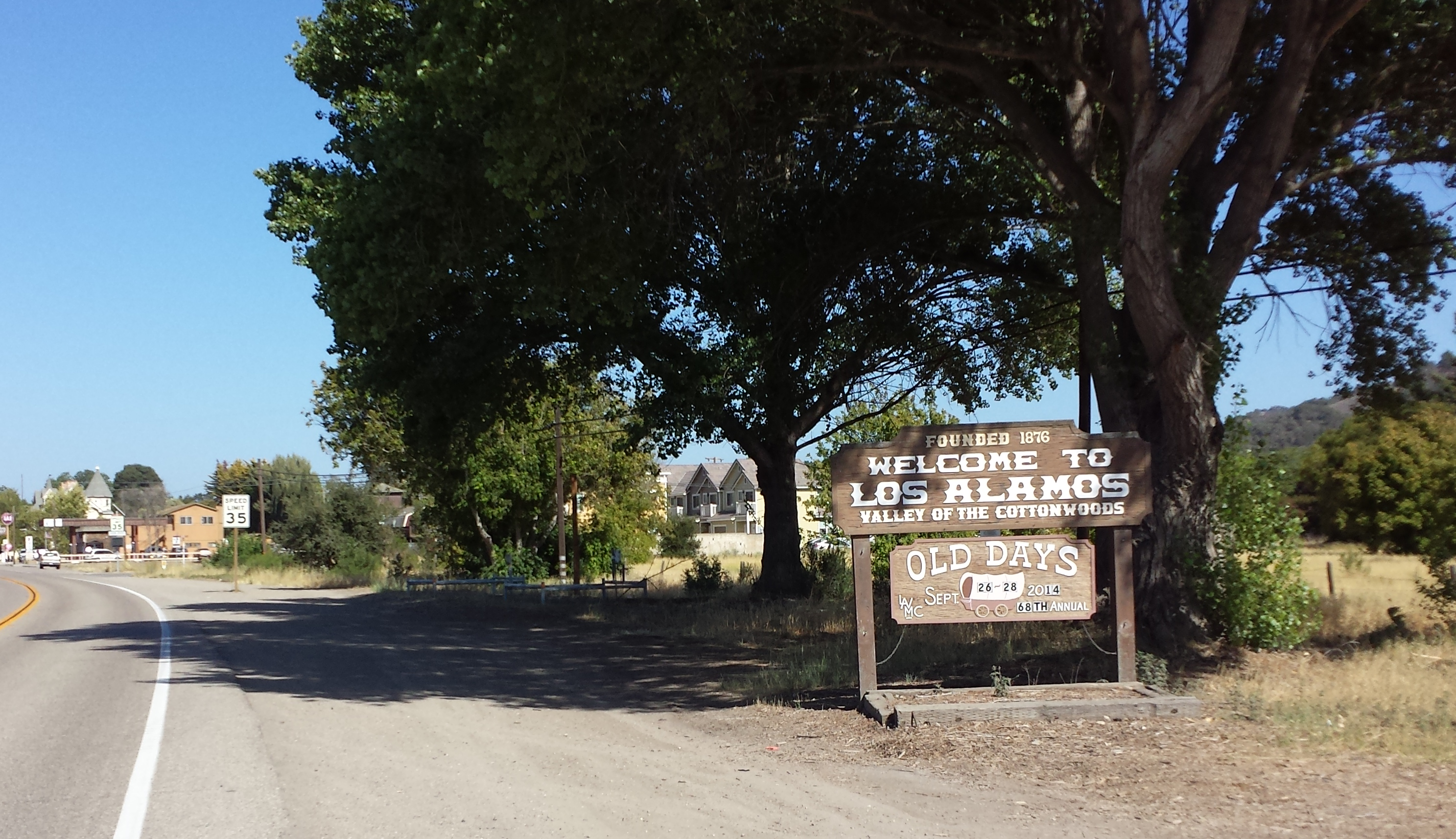
- The Los Alamos welcome sign on Bell Street

- Location in Santa Barbara County and the state of California
- Coordinates: 34°44′31″N 120°16′31″W
- Country: United States
- State: California
- County: Santa Barbara

Government
  - State senator: Monique Limón (D)
  - Assemblymember: Gregg Hart (D)
  - U. S. rep.: Salud Carbajal (D)

Area
  - Total: 0.904 sq mi (2.341 km^{2})
  - Land: 0.904 sq mi (2.341 km^{2})
  - Water: 0 sq mi (0 km^{2}) 0%
- Elevation: 571 ft (174 m)

Population (2020)
  - Total: 1,839
  - Density: 2,035/sq mi (785.6/km^{2})
- Time zone: UTC-8 (Pacific)
  - Summer (DST): UTC-7 (PDT)
- ZIP code: 93440
- Area code: 805
- FIPS code: 06-43252
- GNIS feature IDs: 245130, 2408131

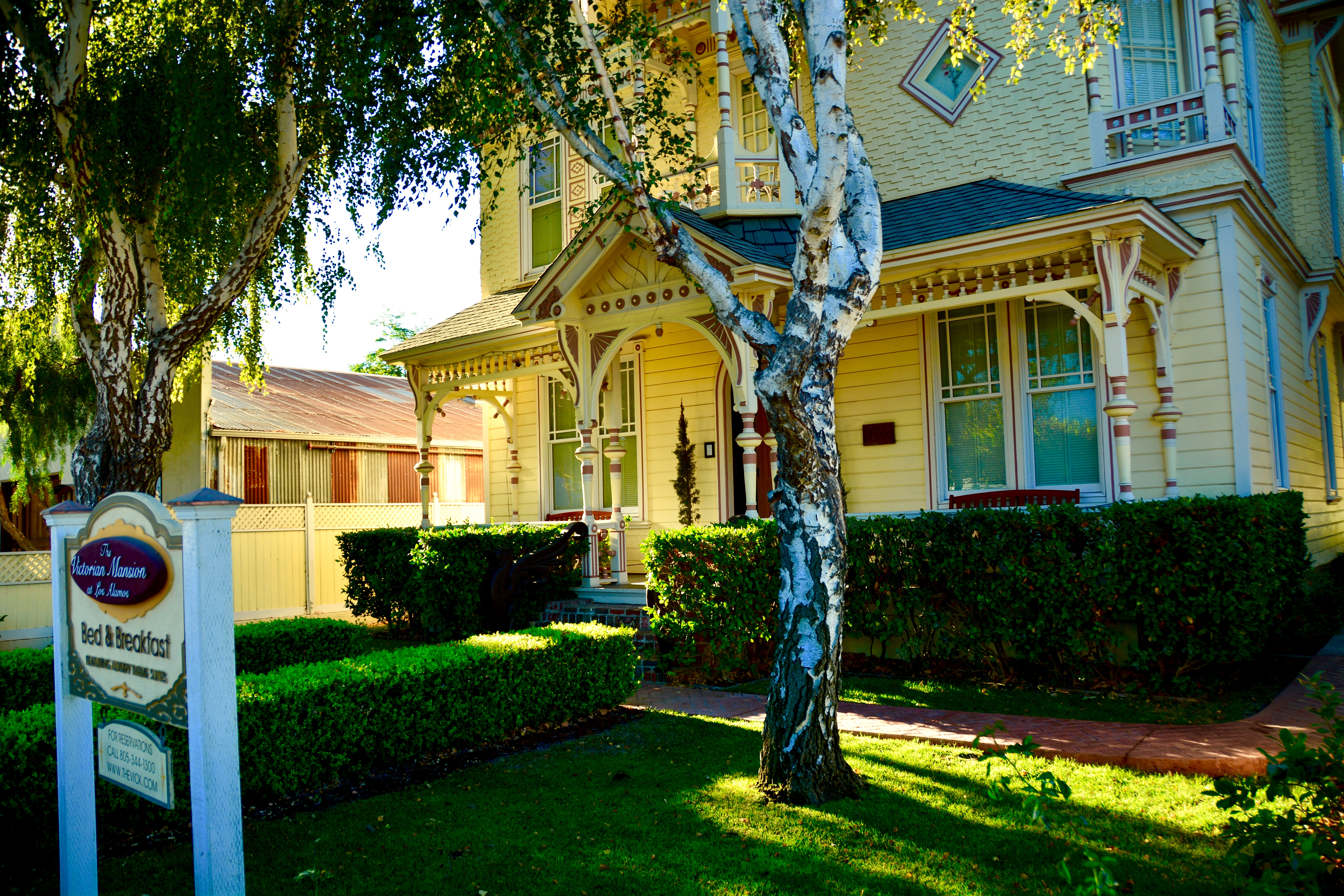
Victorian Inn B&B, Los Alamos

Los Alamos (Spanish: Los Álamos, meaning The Cottonwoods) is an unincorporated community in Santa Barbara County, California, United States. Located in the Los Alamos Valley, the town of Los Alamos is considered to be a part of the Santa Ynez Valley community. It is 140 miles (230 kilometres) northwest of Los Angeles and 281 miles (452 km) south of San Francisco. The population was 1,839 at the 2020 census, down from 1,890 at the 2010 census. For statistical purposes, the United States Census Bureau has defined Los Alamos as a census-designated place (CDP).

== History ==
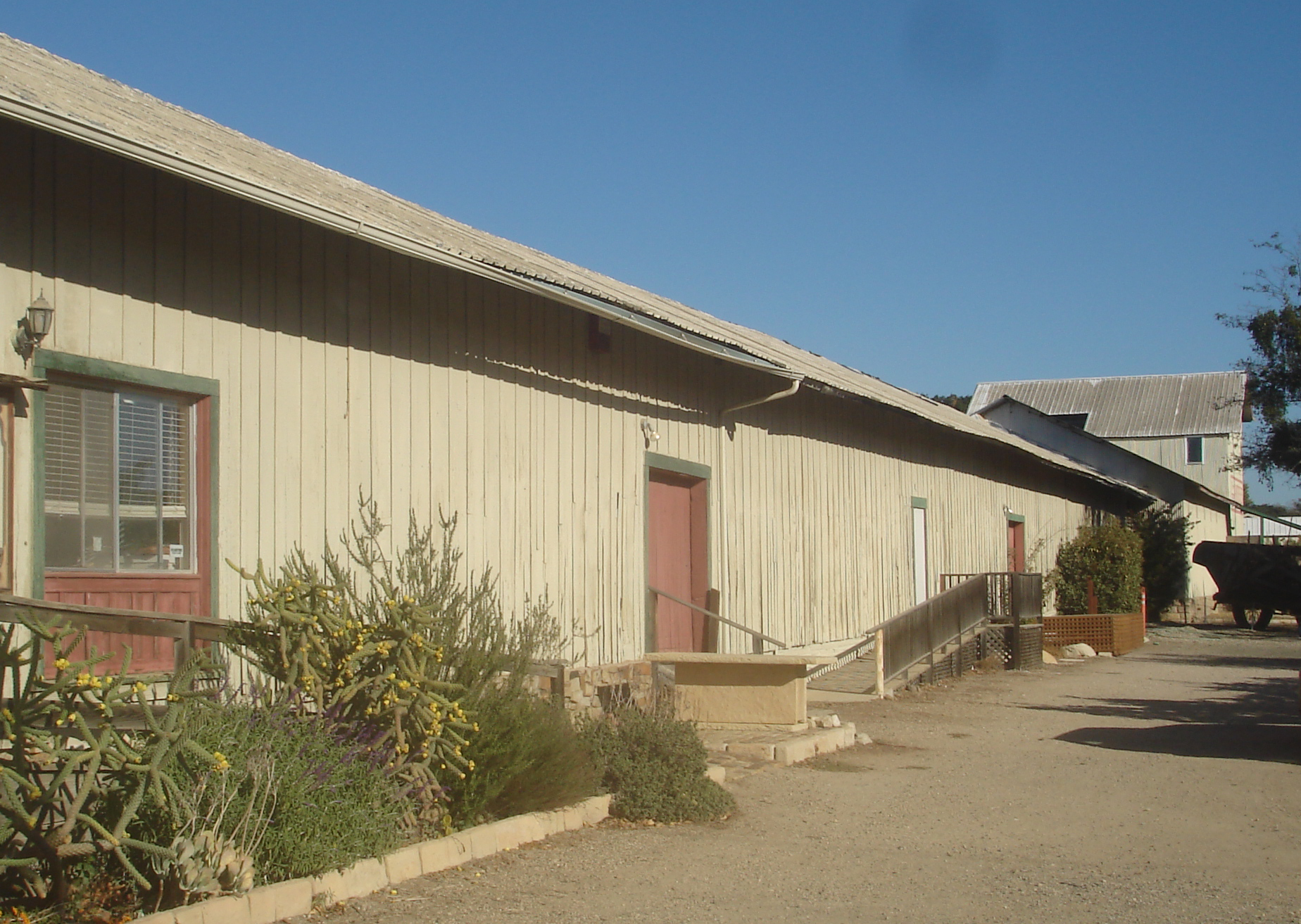
Former Pacific Coast Railway freight shed in Los Alamos, 2014

In 1839, José Antonio de la Guerra, a son of José de la Guerra y Noriega received the Rancho Los Alamos Mexican land grant. The hills above Rancho Los Alamos served as a hideout for bandito Salomon Pico, whose escapades were popularized by the character "Zorro". During the U.S.'s centennial year of 1876, Thomas Bell along with his nephew John S. Bell, and Dr. James B. Shaw (all from San Francisco), purchased acreage from Rancho Los Alamos and neighboring Rancho La Laguna. Both families allocated a half square mile from each of their new ranches to create the Los Alamos town site with "Centennial Street" as the central thoroughfare.

The Los Alamos Valley prospered and grew quickly serving as a popular stagecoach stop from 1861 to 1901. The Union Hotel opened in 1880 to serve overnight travelers. The narrow-gauge Pacific Coast Railway also ran to Los Alamos from San Luis Obispo between 1882 and 1940. Oil was discovered at the Orcutt field in the hills north of Valley in 1901, and in the Purisima Hills south of the valley at the Lompoc Oil Field in 1903, providing more economic prosperity. The town flagpole at Centennial and Bell Street was dedicated in 1918. The Chamber of Commerce was active from 1920 to 1932 and instrumental in forming a lighting district, obtaining telephone service, street paving and mail service. Residents today still pick-up their mail from the Post Office downtown, as no street delivery is available.

Los Alamos, California, is home to the last standing Pacific Coast Railway station, and is now also home to various wine tasting rooms, restaurants, and antique stores.

== Geography ==
According to the United States Census Bureau, the CDP has a total area of 0.9 square miles (2.3 square kilometres), all land. At the 2010 census, it was larger, with an area of 3.9 square miles (10 square kilometres). At the 2000 census, its area was 2.3 square miles (6.0 square kilometres).

Los Alamos is located near the Santa Ynez Valley in the heart of the Santa Barbara wine country, on U.S. Route 101. While Los Alamos is in a narrow valley, the surrounding terrain consists of rolling hills.

Los Alamos is located off U.S. Route 101, approximately 10 miles (16 km) north of Buellton, and 15 miles (24 km) south of Santa Maria. Los Alamos is approximately 140 miles (230 km) northwest of Los Angeles and 281 miles (452 km) south of San Francisco.

Los Alamos is relatively isolated. It is about 10 miles (16 km) to Buellton, California, and Solvang, California and Los Olivos, California to the southeast, Guadalupe, Orcutt and Santa Maria, California to the northwest along Highway 101, 135, Vandenberg Road and Cabrillo Highway. Lompoc, California and Vandenberg Air Force Base are to the west and southwest, respectively. California State Route 135 is the main road to the base. The large Cat Canyon Oil Field is in the hills to the northeast, the Zaca Oil Field to the east-southeast, and the Orcutt Oil Field is in the hills to the northwest of the town.

San Antonio Creek passes through the town on the way to the ocean.

=== Climate ===
This region experiences warm (but not hot) and dry summers, with no average monthly temperatures above 83 degrees Fahrenheit (28 degrees Celsius). According to the Köppen Climate Classification system, Los Alamos has a warm-summer Mediterranean climate, abbreviated "Csb" on climate maps.

Climate data for Los Alamos, California
| Month | Jan | Feb | Mar | Apr | May | Jun | Jul | Aug | Sep | Oct | Nov | Dec | Year |
|---|---|---|---|---|---|---|---|---|---|---|---|---|---|
| Mean daily maximum °C (°F) | 64 (18) | 64 (18) | 68 (20) | 71 (22) | 76 (24) | 78 (26) | 81 (27) | 83 (28) | 82 (28) | 78 (26) | 70 (21) | 65 (18) | 73 (23) |
| Mean daily minimum °C (°F) | 38 (3) | 39 (4) | 40 (4) | 41 (5) | 46 (8) | 49 (9) | 52 (11) | 53 (12) | 51 (11) | 44 (7) | 41 (5) | 36 (2) | 44 (7) |
| Average precipitation mm (inches) | 3.2 (81) | 3.2 (81) | 2.8 (71) | 1.2 (30) | 0.3 (7.6) | 0.1 (2.5) | 0 (0) | 0 (0) | 0.2 (5.1) | 0.6 (15) | 1.4 (36) | 2.5 (64) | 15.5 (390) |
Source: Weatherbase

== Demographics ==
Historical population
| Census | Pop. | Note | %± |
|---|---|---|---|
| 2000 | 1,372 | | — |
| 2010 | 1,890 | | 37.8% |
| 2020 | 1,839 | | −2.7% |
U.S. Decennial Census; 1860–1870 1880-1890; 1900 1910 1920; 1930 1940 1950; 1960 1970 1980; 1990 2000 2010; 2020

Los Alamos first appeared as a census designated place in the 2000 U.S. census.

=== Racial and ethnic composition ===
Los Alamos CDP, California – Racial and ethnic composition Note: the US Census treats Hispanic/Latino as an ethnic category. This table excludes Latinos from the racial categories and assigns them to a separate category. Hispanics/Latinos may be of any race.
| Race / Ethnicity (NH = Non-Hispanic) | Pop 2000 | Pop 2010 | Pop 2020 | % 2000 | % 2010 | % 2020 |
|---|---|---|---|---|---|---|
| White alone (NH) | 838 | 1,057 | 800 | 61.08% | 55.93% | 43.50% |
| Black or African American alone (NH) | 1 | 4 | 8 | 0.07% | 0.21% | 0.44% |
| Native American or Alaska Native alone (NH) | 20 | 3 | 24 | 1.46% | 0.16% | 1.31% |
| Asian alone (NH) | 10 | 32 | 20 | 0.73% | 1.69% | 1.09% |
| Native Hawaiian or Pacific Islander alone (NH) | 7 | 0 | 0 | 0.51% | 0.00% | 0.00% |
| Other race alone (NH) | 0 | 0 | 7 | 0.00% | 0.00% | 0.38% |
| Mixed race or Multiracial (NH) | 20 | 21 | 52 | 1.46% | 1.11% | 2.83% |
| Hispanic or Latino (any race) | 476 | 773 | 928 | 34.69% | 40.90% | 50.46% |
| Total | 1,372 | 1,890 | 1,839 | 100.00% | 100.00% | 100.00% |

=== 2020 census ===
As of the 2020 census, Los Alamos had a population of 1,839. The population density was 2,034.3 inhabitants per square mile (785.4/km^{2}). The racial makeup of Los Alamos was 990 (53.8%) White, 12 (0.7%) African American, 55 (3.0%) Native American, 20 (1.1%) Asian, 0 (0.0%) Pacific Islander, 380 (20.7%) from other races, and 382 (20.8%) from two or more races. Hispanic or Latino of any race were 928 persons (50.5%).

The census reported that 99.1% of the population lived in households, 17 people (0.9%) lived in non-institutionalized group quarters, and no one was institutionalized. In addition, 0.0% of residents lived in urban areas, while 100.0% lived in rural areas.

There were 644 households, out of which 187 (29.0%) had children under the age of 18 living in them, 376 (58.4%) were married-couple households, 30 (4.7%) were cohabiting couple households, 138 (21.4%) had a female householder with no partner present, and 100 (15.5%) had a male householder with no partner present. About 139 households (21.6%) were one person, and 60 (9.3%) were one person aged 65 or older. The average household size was 2.83. There were 466 families (72.4% of all households).

The age distribution was 438 people (23.8%) under the age of 18, 156 people (8.5%) aged 18 to 24, 436 people (23.7%) aged 25 to 44, 516 people (28.1%) aged 45 to 64, and 293 people (15.9%) who were 65 years of age or older. The median age was 39.4 years. For every 100 females, there were 99.0 males, and for every 100 females age 18 and over there were 95.7 males.

There were 676 housing units at an average density of 747.8 units per square mile (288.7 units/km^{2}), of which 644 (95.3%) were occupied. Of these, 404 (62.7%) were owner-occupied, and 240 (37.3%) were occupied by renters. The homeowner vacancy rate was 3.6% and the rental vacancy rate was 0.0%.

=== Income and poverty ===
In 2023, the US Census Bureau estimated that the median household income was $53,673, and the per capita income was $44,049. About 0.0% of families and 3.3% of the population were below the poverty line.

=== 2010 census ===
The 2010 United States census reported that Los Alamos had a population of 1,890. The population density was 488.6 inhabitants per square mile (188.6/km^{2}). The racial makeup of Los Alamos was 1,667 (88.2 percent) White, 5 (0.3 percent) African American, 10 (0.5 percent) Native American, 32 (1.7 percent) Asian, 0 (0.0 percent) Pacific Islander, 134 (7.1 percent) from other races, and 42 (2.2 percent) from two or more races. Hispanic or Latino of any race were 773 persons (40.9 percent).

The Census reported that 1,890 people (100 percent of the population) lived in households, 0 (0 percent) lived in non-institutionalized group quarters, and 0 (0 percent) were institutionalized.

There were 628 households, out of which 244 (38.9 percent) had children under the age of 18 living in them, 369 (58.8 percent) were opposite-sex married couples living together, 55 (8.8 percent) had a female householder with no husband present, 37 (5.9 percent) had a male householder with no wife present. There were 30 (4.8 percent) unmarried opposite-sex partnerships, and 8 (1.3 percent) same-sex married couples or partnerships. 124 households (19.7 percent) were made up of individuals, and 28 (4.5 percent) had someone living alone who was 65 years of age or older. The average household size was 3.01. There were 461 families (73.4 percent of all households); the average family size was 3.52.

The population was spread out, with 495 people (26.2 percent) under the age of 18, 173 people (9.2 percent) aged 18 to 24, 454 people (24.0 percent) aged 25 to 44, 589 people (31.2 percent) aged 45 to 64, and 179 people (9.5 percent) who were 65 years of age or older. The median age was 38.2 years. For every 100 females, there were 100.2 males. For every 100 females age 18 and over, there were 95.4 males.

There were 681 housing units at an average density of 176.0 per square mile (68.0/km^{2}), of which 386 (61.5 percent) were owner-occupied, and 242 (38.5 percent) were occupied by renters. The homeowner vacancy rate was 1.5 percent; the rental vacancy rate was 6.4 percent. 1,141 people (60.4 percent of the population) lived in owner-occupied housing units and 749 people (39.6 percent) lived in rental housing units.

== Economy ==
Los Alamos is a small, unincorporated town in a region of ranches, oil fields, vegetable farms (broccoli, lettuce and strawberries), and wine grape vineyards.

The main street in Los Alamos is Bell Street, or California Route 135. Many businesses line this area. Several of these eateries and wineries were featured in the summer 2012 issue of Edible Santa Barbara.

== Parks and recreation ==
The local elementary school, Olga Reed School, is located next to Los Alamos County Park. The second park in Los Alamos is Arthur Ferrini Park, located next to the Los Alamos Market. Many locals walk or ride their bicycles around town.

== Arts and culture ==
Los Alamos Old Days is a celebration held in September annually on Bell Street. Los Alamos Old Days is usually two days long and offers stands and booths as well as a parade that celebrates the agriculture and history around Los Alamos Valley, the Valley of the Cottonwoods. In local Spanish, "álamo" refers to Fremont Cottonwood (Populus fremontii) trees, native to the area. Many of these "cottonwoods" grew along the banks of San Antonio Creek.

== In popular culture ==
The town was featured in Visiting... with Huell Howser Episode 1022.

In the 2004 film Sideways, Stephanie, one of the four main characters played by Sandra Oh, lives in Los Alamos.

The town, particularly the Union Hotel, served as the shooting location for the music video for Say Say Say by Michael Jackson and Paul McCartney.
