= Sisquoc Formation =

Sedimentary geologic unit widespread in Southern California

- Stratigraphic range: Late Miocene to early Pliocene, 6–3.8 Ma
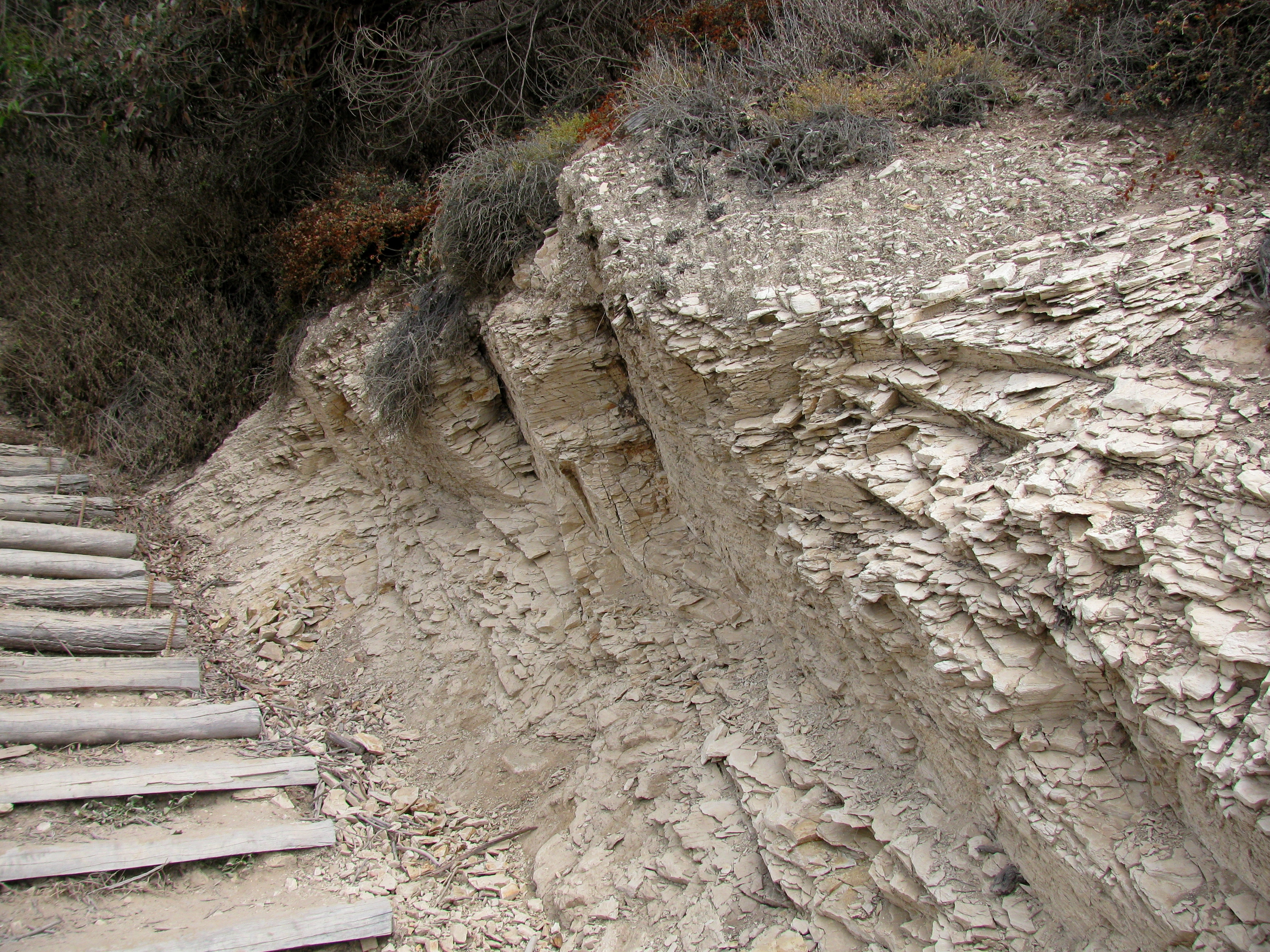
- Sisquoc Formation at the stairs to More Mesa Beach, Santa Barbara, California
- Type: Sedimentary
- Unit of: Los Angeles Basin
- Underlies: Pico Formation, Santa Barbara Formation, Foxen Mudstone, others
- Overlies: Monterey Formation
- Thickness: Up to 1000 feet in Santa Barbara area; 1100 feet at type locality; up to 5000 feet south of Lompoc.

Lithology
- Primary: mudstone, shale, diatomite
- Other: conglomerate

Location
- Region: Southern California
- Country: United States

Type section
- Named for: Sisquoc River, about 10 miles southeast of Santa Maria, California
- Named by: Porter (1932)

The Sisquoc Formation is a sedimentary geologic unit widespread in Southern California, both on the coast and in mountains near the coast. Overlying the Monterey Formation, it is of upper Miocene and lower Pliocene age (from about 4 to 6 million years old). The formation consists of claystone, mudstone, siltstone, shale, diatomite, and conglomerates, with considerable regional variation, and was deposited in a moderately deep marine environment at a depth of approximately 500–5,000 feet (150–1,520 m). Since some of its diatomites, along with those of the underlying Monterey Formation, are of unusual purity and extent, they can be mined as diatomaceous earth. France-based Imerys operates a mine in the Sisquoc and Monterey Formations in the hills south of Lompoc, California, the largest such operation in the world.

== Type locality, description, and occurrence ==
The type locality for the Sisquoc Formation is along the Sisquoc River, in northern Santa Barbara County, about 1 mile (1.6 km) east of its confluence with Foxen Canyon. In this location the formation consists mainly of sandstones, but also some siltstone and diatomite, and is about 1,100 feet (340 m) thick. In other places, such as in the Purisima Hills north of Lompoc, in and adjacent to the Lompoc Oil Field, its total thickness reaches 5,000 feet (1,500 m). Diatomite is a major component of the formation in the hills north and south of Lompoc, where it is interbedded with diatomaceous clay shale. The lowest portion of the formation in the Purisima Hills contains tar, for it is here that the unit forms an impermeable cap on the underlying Monterey reservoir of the Lompoc Oil Field.

The Sisquoc Formation is not as resistant to erosion as other formations in the stratigraphic sequence in coastal California, and south of the Santa Ynez Mountains. It weathers to hilly terrain with gray soil that supports grasses. It outcrops rarely, being best exposed in road cuts, along rivers, and especially along the cliffs on the coast, where it is easily visible from the beach. Many prominent exposures of the Sisquoc occur at the beaches along the Gaviota Coast from Santa Barbara west to Gaviota. In the Santa Maria Basin – the area surrounding the city of Santa Maria and the hills to the south and southwest – well-weathered outcrops of the formation are often bleached white.

== Deposition environment ==
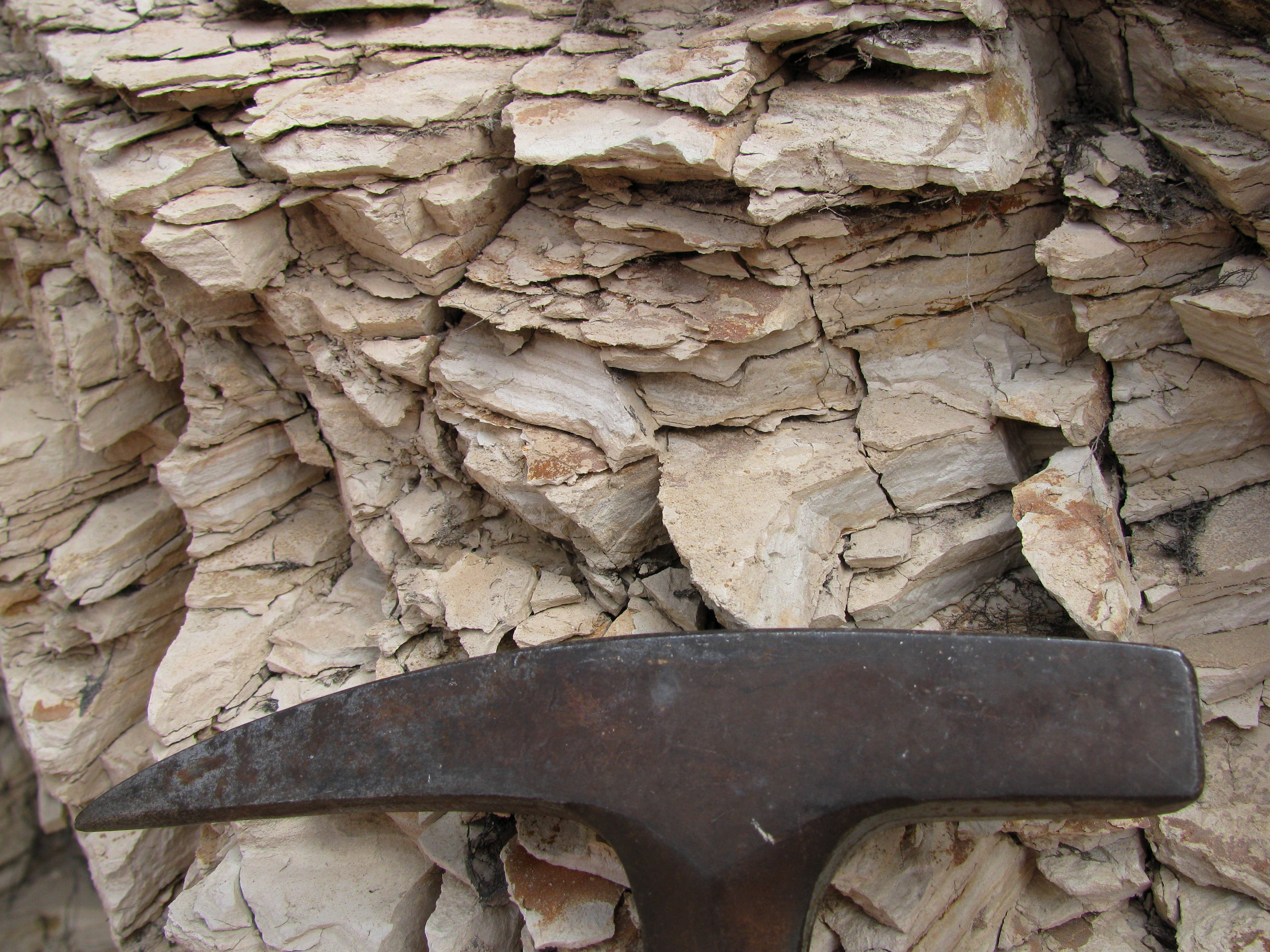
Close-up photograph of the Sisquoc Formation, showing the friable, planiform nature of the rock on a weathered surface. Rock hammer for scale.

The Sisquoc Formation was deposited in a middle bathyal environment, at a depth of between 150 and 1500 meters, between approximately 4 and 6 million years ago – the upper Miocene and lower Pliocene eras. During this time, the region was continuing to subside; as a result, sediments deposited later in the period tend to be finer-grained, since the deeper the water, the finer the sediment deposited there. Even though the deposition environment was far from shore, the unit contains occasional conglomerates. One such unit near More Mesa Beach in Santa Barbara, containing clasts from the underlying Monterey Formation, was probably the result of a submarine landslide, bringing down pebbles and boulders from that older formation, which had already been uplifted onshore.

The bulk of the Sisquoc north of the Santa Ynez River was deposited as a fine mud, rich with diatoms. Tests of these tiny marine creatures form diatomite, and some of their organic remains persist as the high organic carbon content of parts of the formation (when conditions are right, these organic remains form petroleum reservoirs). South of the Santa Ynez Mountains, the ocean was deeper and the formation consists of finer muds and clays.

Going east along the Santa Ynez River, the Sisquoc Formation grades into the Tequepis Sandstone, in which diatomite is gradually replaced by sandstones of granitic origin.

== Paleontology ==
Numerous fossils have been found in the Sisquoc Formation. Within Santa Barbara County, the Sisquoc alone has produced 127 separate finds, which are catalogued by the University of California, Berkeley Museum of Paleontology. In addition to the abundant diatoms which make up the diatomite, fossils include vertebrates such as sea lions and walruses, bony and cartilaginous fishes, and birds. Additional fossils include radiolarians, arenaceous foraminifers, and remains of sponges.

== Economic importance ==
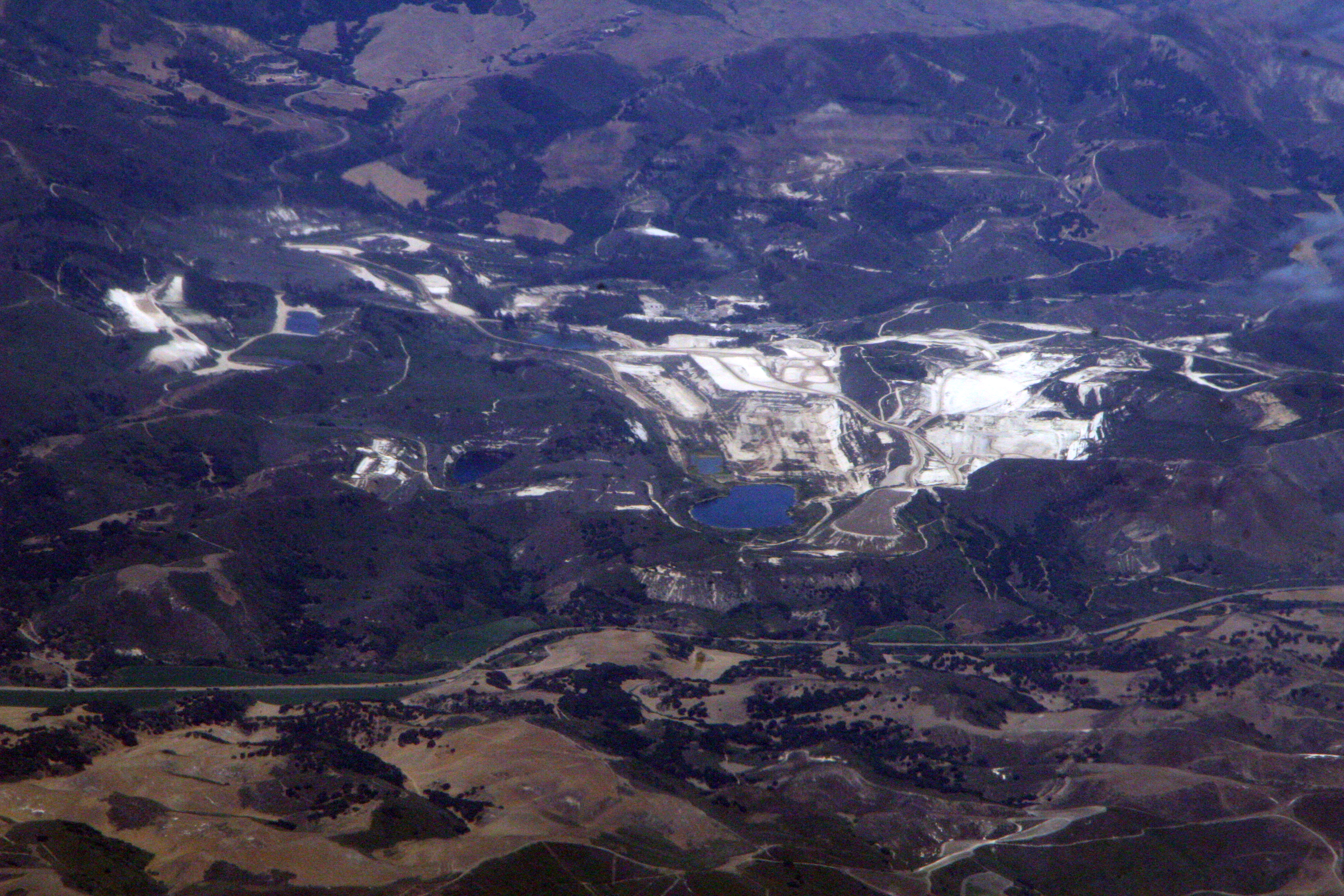
Diatomite quarries near Lompoc, California (2009), are a major source of diatomaceous earth.

The Sisquoc Formation is important as a source of diatomaceous earth and as a petroleum reservoir.

As a stratigraphic member of petroleum reservoirs, it can be both a reservoir and a sealing unit. Sometimes, as in the Lompoc Oil Field, it serves as an impermeable cap rock to an oil-bearing unit, in that case in the Monterey Formation; in other cases, such as in the Casmalia Oil Field and the offshore portion of the Ellwood Oil Field, it is an oil-bearing unit in its own right. In the Casmalia field, west of Santa Maria, pebbly and high-porosity units contain a considerable amount of oil, while clay-rich and diatomaceous mudstones contain almost none.

While most of the oil found in the Sisquoc Formation has gotten there by migrating upward from the underlying Monterey Formation, the primary source rock for petroleum in southwestern California, sometimes the Sisquoc is itself a source rock. In places the formation contains enough organic carbon – up to six percent – to generate oil under the right conditions, such as burial in deep synclines with high enough temperature and sufficient time (several million years) to cause the kerogen from the decomposing organic matter to be matured, via hydrocarbon cracking, into petroleum.

The diatomites of the Sisquoc, like those of the Monterey, can function both as oil-bearing units – where they have been capped with impermeable beds – or they may be oil-free, in which case, if they are near the surface and of sufficient purity, they can be mined as diatomaceous earth. The world's largest such deposit, operated by Imerys, is in the Sisquoc and Monterey formations in the hills south of Lompoc, California; the USGS estimates that the Lompoc mine alone with its large reserves could meet the needs of the entire world for centuries.
