= Antonio Menchaca Careaga =

Spanish novelist and poet (1921–2002)

Antonio Menchaca Careaga (15 July 1921 – 2002) was a Spanish novelist and poet. He was born at Las Arenas, province of Vizcaya, educated at Catholic institutions, Oxford University, and the University of Madrid. He had a maritime career at first but was committed to peace in the world. He is regarded as a liberal defender of democracy under the fascist dictatorship of Franco. After he signed a manifesto ("of the 500") against the Law of Succession to the Headship of the State in 1947, the navy expelled him. Thereafter he worked for a shipping company, while continuing to write.

== Works ==
- Bandera negra (Black Flag). Ed. Plaza y Janés, Barcelona, 1964
- Mar de fondo (Sea of Background), novela, finalista Premio Nadal en 1965
- Las cenizas del esplendor (The Ashes of Splendour), Amor siempre asediado y La crisálida. Trilogía de novelas históricas que narran desde la guerra Carlista de 1870 hasta cien años después.
- Resucitar en Palermo (Resurrection in Palermo)
- La Rosa de los vientos. A historiographic work that tells the story of the Bodega y Quadra exploration.
- El camino de Roma (The Way of Rome) a travel book.
- Cara a España (Face to Spain).
- Bilbaíno en Londres (Bilbaino in London)
- Las horas decisivas. Memorias (The Decisive Hours). Ed. Espasa-Calpe, Madrid, 1992
