= Gabriel Careaga Medina =

Gabriel Careaga Medina (15 June 1941 – 12 January 2004) was a sociologist, academic, and essayist. His fields of interest were politics and society in Mexico. He studied sociology at Universidad Nacional Autónoma de México (UNAM), and later earned a master's degree in economics at the College of Mexico. He was a professor on the faculty of Science, Politics, and Society at UNAM for three decades. He died of cancer at the age of 62.

== Career ==
Medina edited Spanish-language periodicals, such as, El Universal, Revista de Bellas Artes, Revista Mexicana de Cultura, La Guía, Revista de revistas, La Cultura, and Uno más uno. His work in sociology followed three themes: intellectuals and their relationship to politics, economic development and modernization, and the middle class and urban life.

== Works ==
Medina authored the following publications, all in Spanish:

- Biografía de un joven de la clase media
- Sociedad y teatro moderno en México
- Erotismo, violencia y política en el cine
- Estrellas de cine: los mitos del siglo XX
- Los espejismos del desarrollo: entre la utopía y el progreso
- Los intelectuales y la política en México
- Los intelectuales y el poder
- El siglo desgarrado
- Crisis de la razón y de la modernidad
- La ciudad emmascarada y Cuba, el fin de una utopía

== Death ==
Medina died of cancer on 12 January 2004.
