= Diatomaceous earth =

Soft, siliceous sedimentary rock

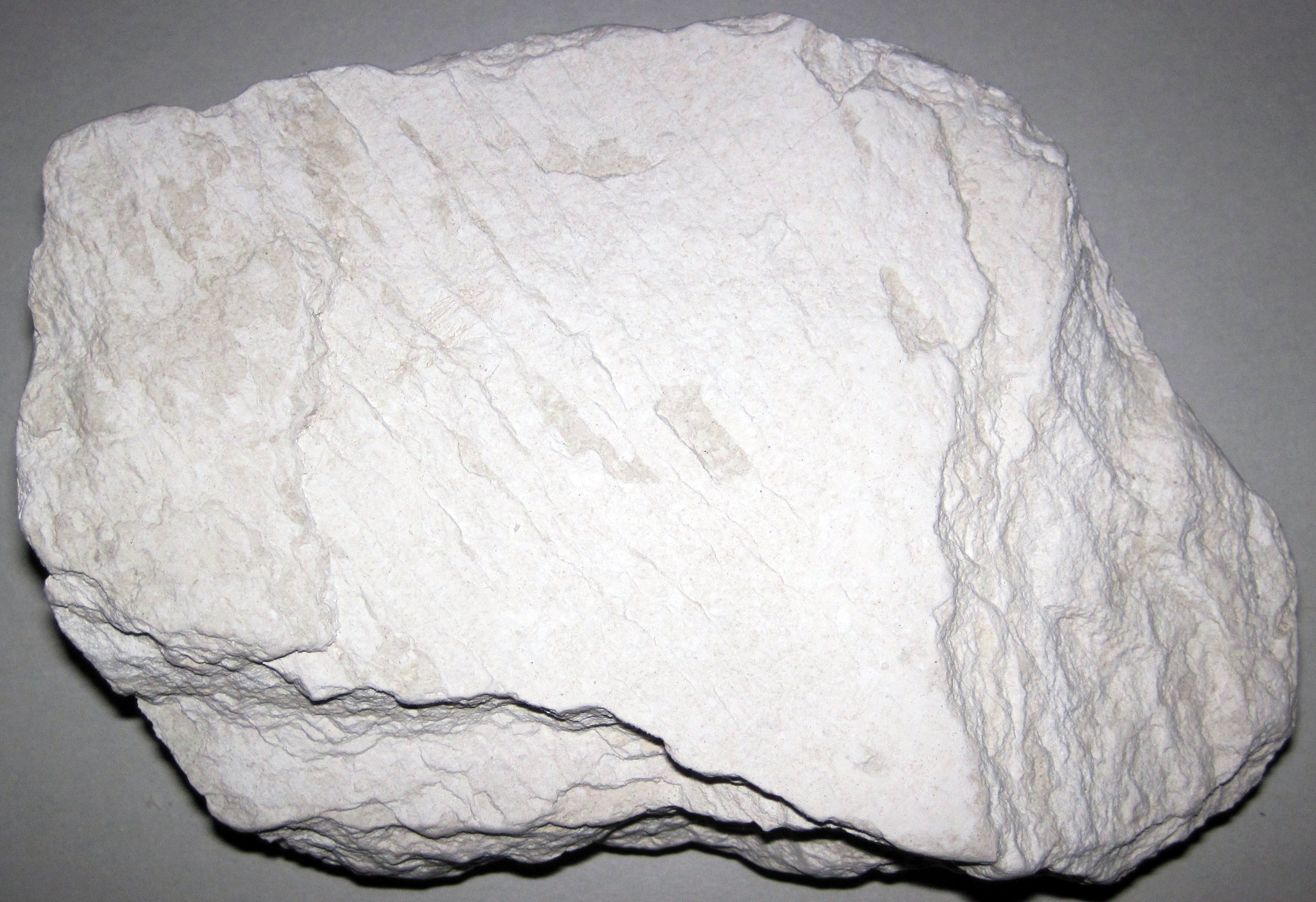
Diatomite rock sample from the Sisquoc Formation

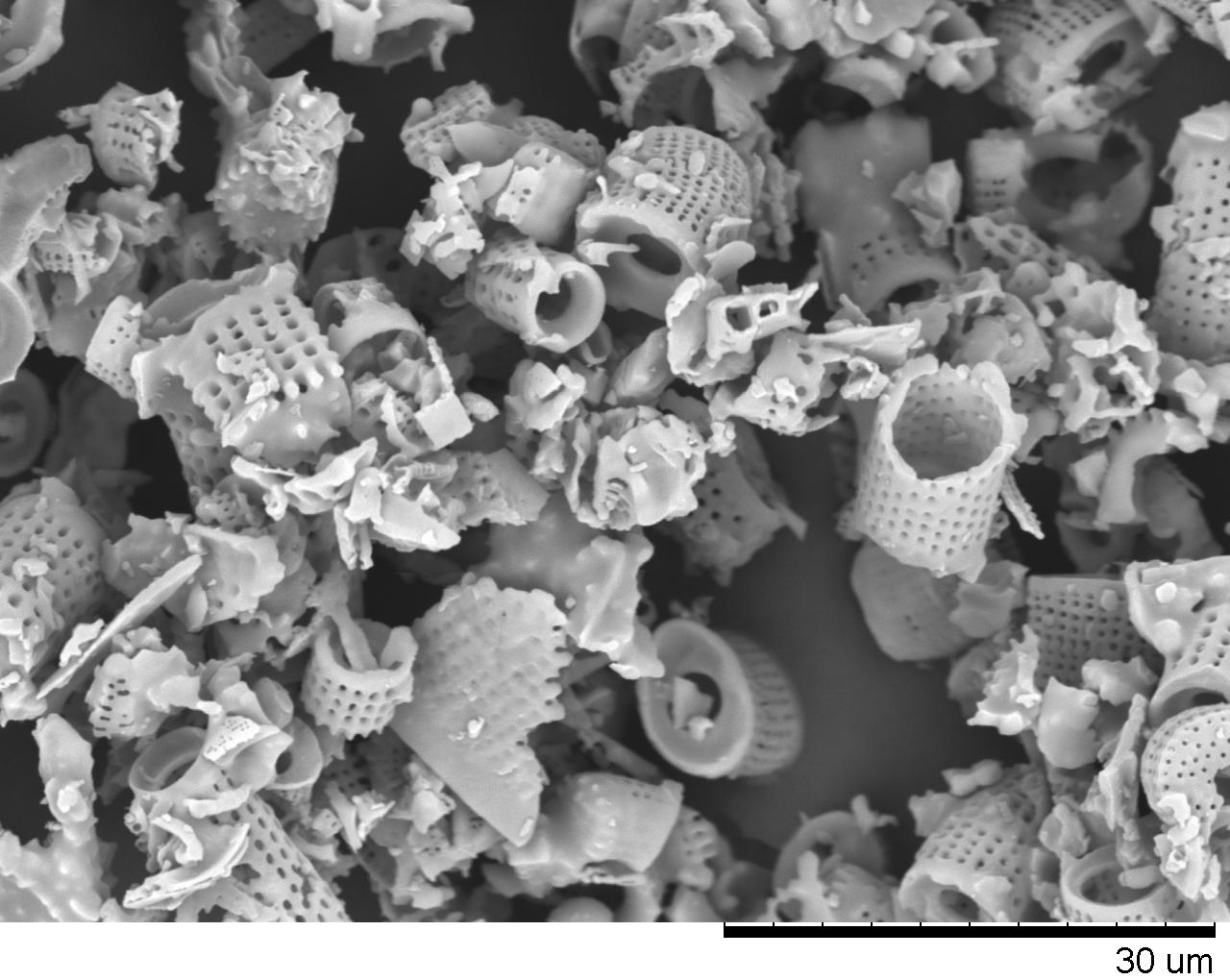
Scanning electron micrograph of diatomaceous earth

Diatomaceous earth (/ˌdaɪ.ətəˈmeɪʃəs/ DY-ə-tə-MAY-shəs), also known as diatomite (/daɪˈætəmaɪt/ dy-AT-ə-myte), celite, or kieselgur, is a naturally occurring, soft, siliceous sedimentary rock that can be crumbled into a fine white to off-white powder. It has a particle size ranging from more than 3 mm to less than 1 μm, but typically 10 to 200 μm. Depending on the granularity, this powder can have an abrasive feel, like that of pumice powder, and has a low density as a result of its high porosity. The typical chemical composition of oven-dried diatomaceous earth is 80–90% silica, with 2–4% alumina (attributed mostly to clay minerals), and 0.5–2% iron oxide.

Diatomaceous earth consists of the fossilized remains of diatoms, a type of hard-shelled microalgae, that have accumulated over millions of years. It is used as a filtration aid, mild abrasive in products including metal polishes and toothpaste, mechanical insecticide, absorbent for liquids, matting agent for coatings, reinforcing filler in plastics and rubber, anti-block in plastic films, porous support for chemical catalysts, cat litter, deodorant, activator in coagulation studies, stabilizing component of dynamite, thermal insulator, and soil for potted plants and trees as in the art of bonsai. It is also used in gas chromatography packed columns made with glass or metal as stationary phase.

== Composition ==
Diatomaceous earth consists of the fossilized remains of diatoms that accumulated over millions of years. It is usually composed of 80% to 90% silica, 2% to 4% alumina minerals, and 0.5% to 2% iron oxide, although the precise composition of every deposit is different. Deposits may contain different amounts of silica depending on the sedimentation conditions, the presence of other sediments (clay, sand, volcanic ashes), and the age of the deposit (diagenesis, silica (SiO_{2}) dissolution/precipitation, diatoms tests ageing). The species of diatom may also differ among deposits. The species of diatom is dependent upon the age and paleoecology of the deposit. In turn, the shape of a diatom is determined by its species.

Many deposits throughout British Columbia, such as Red Lake Earth, are from the Miocene epoch and contain a species of diatom known as Melosira granulata. These diatoms have a small globular shape. A deposit containing diatoms from this epoch can provide certain benefits over others. For example, diatoms from the Eocene epoch are not as effective in their ability to absorb fluids because as older diatoms recrystallize, their small pores become filled with silica.

== Formation ==
Diatomite forms by the accumulation of the amorphous silica (opal, SiO_{2}·nH_{2}O) remains of dead diatoms (microscopic single-celled algae) in lake sediment or marine sediments. The fossil remains consist of a pair of symmetrical shells or frustules. Marine diatomites are found in association with a wide variety of other rock types but lacustrine diatomites are almost always associated with volcanic rock. Diatomaceous chert consists of diatomite that has been cemented with silica.

Diatoms are able to extract silica from water that is less than 1% saturated in amorphous silica (saturation index (SI): -2). Their frustules remain undissolved because they are surrounded by an organic matrix. Clay minerals may also precipitate on the frustules and protect them from dissolution in sea water. When the diatom dies, the frustule is stripped of its organic layer and exposed to sea water. As a result, only 1% to 10% of frustules survive long enough to be buried under sediments and some of this is dissolved within the sediments. Only an estimated 0.05% to 0.15% of the original amount of silica produced by diatoms is preserved in the sedimentary record.

== Discovery ==
In 1836 or 1837, German peasant Peter Kasten discovered diatomaceous earth (German: Kieselgur) when sinking a well on the northern slopes of the Haußelberg hill, on Lüneburg Heath in North Germany.

The extraction site on Lüneburg Heath from 1863 to 1994 was Neuohe, while the storage sites were:

Storage site	from	to
Wiechel	1871	1978
Hützel	1876	1969
Hösseringen	c. 1880	1894
Hammerstorf	c. 1880	1920
Oberohe	1884	1970
Schmarbeck	1896	c. 1925
Steinbeck	1897	1928
Breloh	1907	1975
Schwindebeck	1913	1973
Hetendorf	1970	1994

The deposits are up to 28 meters (92 ft) thick and are all of freshwater diatomaceous earth.

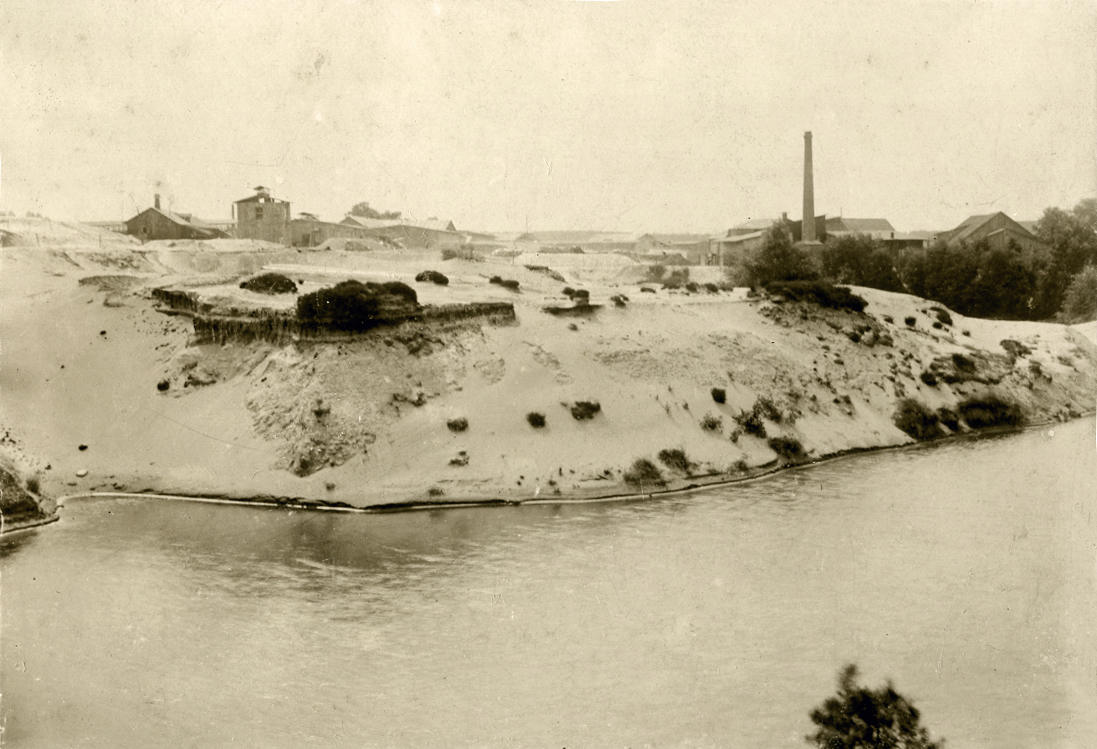
c. 1900–1910 Diatomaceous earth pit at Neuohe

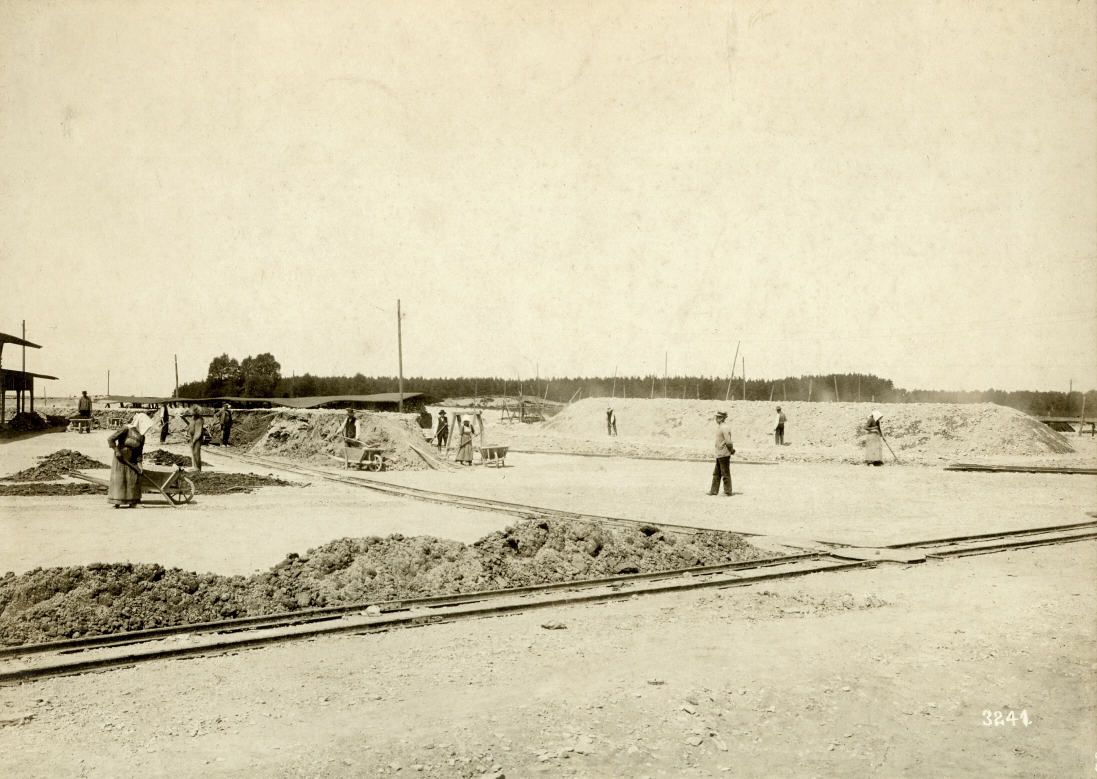
c. 1900–1910 a drying area: One firing pile is being prepared; another is under way.

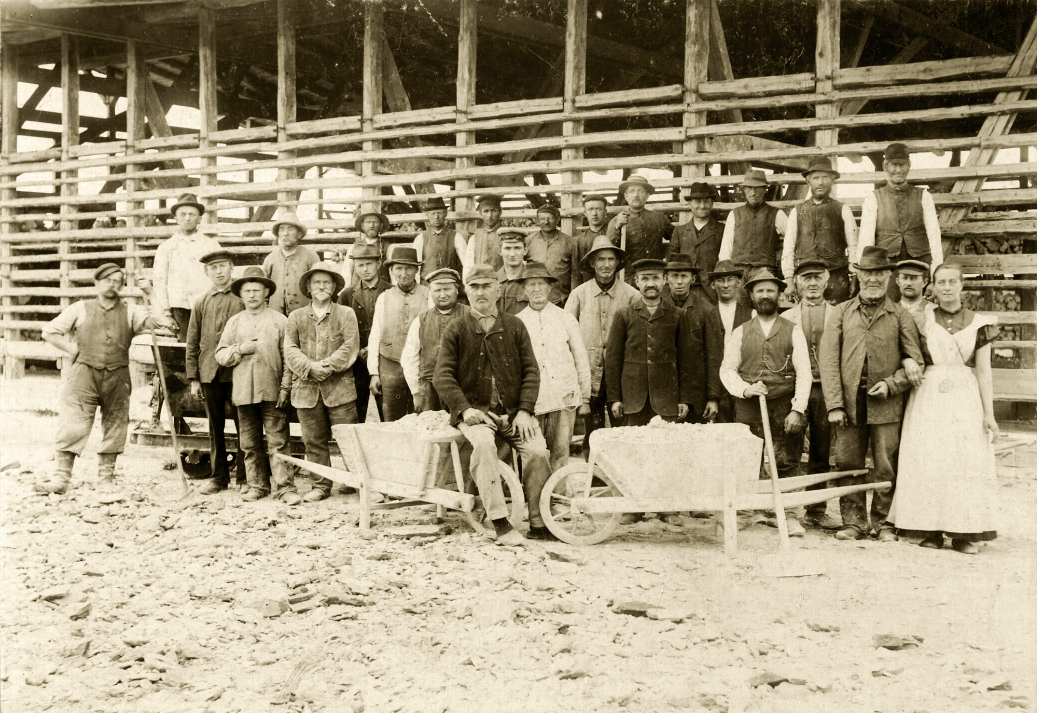
1913: Staff at the Neuohe factory, with male workers and a female cook in front of a drying shed

Until World War I, almost the entire worldwide production of diatomaceous earth was from this region.

== Other deposits ==
In Poland diatomaceous earth deposits are found in Jawornik, and are composed mostly of diatomaceous skeletons (frustules).

In Germany, diatomaceous earth was also extracted at Altenschlirf on the Vogelsberg (Upper Hesse) and at Klieken (Saxony-Anhalt).

There is a layer of diatomaceous earth more than 6 meters (20 ft) thick in the nature reserve of Soos in the Czech Republic.

Deposits on the Isle of Skye, off the west coast of Scotland, were mined until 1960.

In Colorado and in Clark County, Nevada, United States, there are deposits that are up to several hundred meters thick in places. Marine deposits have been worked in the Sisquoc Formation in Santa Barbara County, California near Lompoc and along the Southern California coast. This is the world's largest deposit of diatomite. Additional marine deposits have been worked in Maryland, Virginia, Algeria and the MoClay of Denmark. Freshwater lake deposits occur in Nevada, Oregon, Washington and California. Lake deposits also occur in interglacial lakes in the eastern United States, in Canada and in Europe in Germany, France, Denmark and the Czech Republic. The worldwide association of diatomite deposits and volcanic deposits suggests that the availability of silica from volcanic ash may be necessary for thick diatomite deposits.

Diatomaceous earth is sometimes found on desert surfaces. Research has shown that the erosion of diatomaceous earth in such areas (such as the Bodélé Depression in the Sahara) is one of the most important sources of climate-affecting dust in the atmosphere.

The siliceous frustules of diatoms accumulate in fresh and brackish wetlands and lakes. Some peats and mucks contain a sufficient abundance of frustules such that they can be mined. Most of Florida's diatomaceous earths have been found in the muck of wetlands or lakes. The American Diatomite Corporation, from 1935 to 1946, refined a maximum of 145 tons per year from their processing plant near Clermont, Florida. Muck from several locations in Lake County, Florida was dried and burned (calcined) to produce the diatomaceous earth.

It was formerly extracted from Lake Mývatn in Iceland.

The commercial deposits of diatomite are restricted to Tertiary or Quaternary periods. Older deposits from as early as the Cretaceous Period are known, but are of low quality.

Diatomite deposits rich in fossils have been located in New Zealand, but mining of the Foulden Maar deposits on an industrial scale, for conversion to animal feed, has drawn strong opposition.

== Commercial form ==
Diatomaceous earth is available commercially in several formats:

- granulated diatomaceous earth is a raw material simply crushed for convenient packaging
- milled or micronized diatomaceous earth is especially fine (10 μm to 50 μm) and used for insecticides
- calcined diatomaceous earth is heat-treated and activated for filters

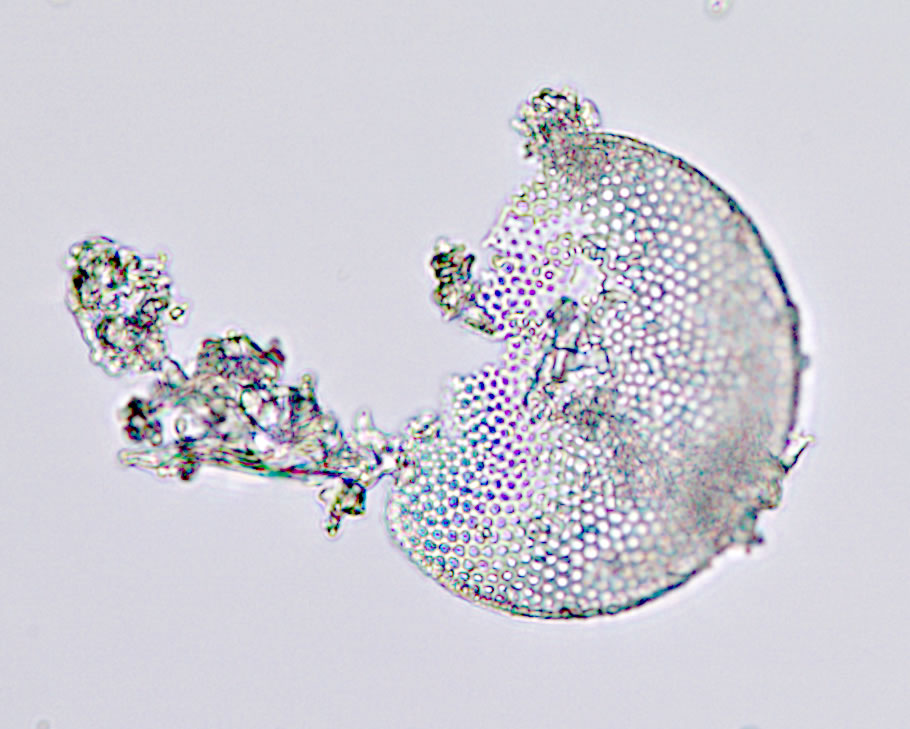
Individual diatom cell walls often maintain their shape even in commercially processed filter media, such as this one for swimming pools.

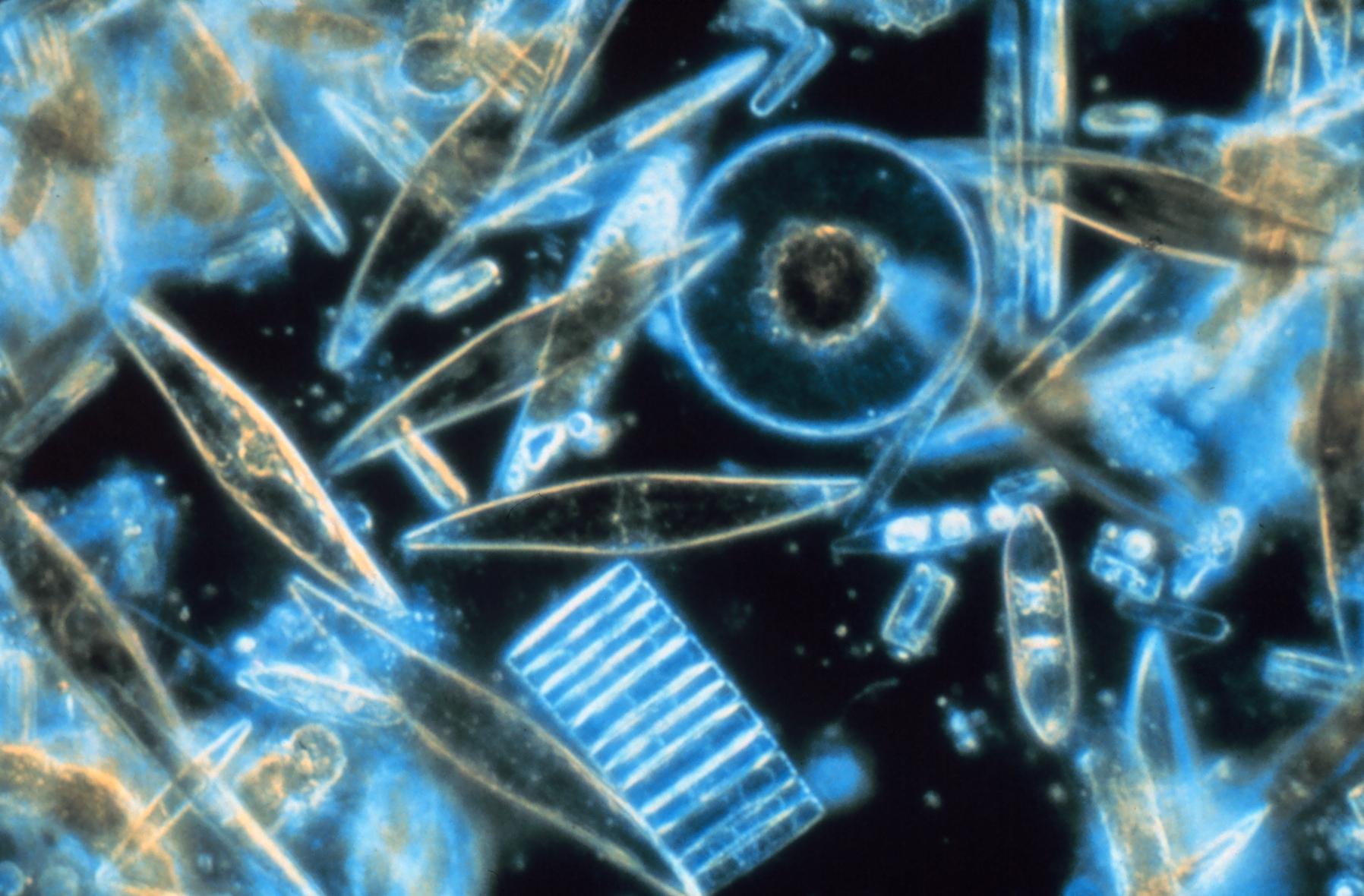
Live marine diatoms from Antarctica (magnified)

== Usage ==
=== Explosives ===
In 1866, Alfred Nobel discovered that nitroglycerin could be made more stable if absorbed in diatomite (kieselgur in German). This allowed safer transport and handling than pure nitroglycerin in liquid form. Nobel patented this mixture as dynamite in 1867; the mixture is also called guhr dynamite in reference to the kieselgur.

=== Filtration ===
The Celle engineer, Wilhelm Berkefeld, recognized the ability of diatomaceous earth to filter and developed tubular filters (known as filter candles) fired from diatomaceous earth. During the cholera epidemic in Hamburg in 1892, these Berkefeld filters were used successfully.

One form of diatomaceous earth is used as a filter medium, especially for swimming pools. It has a high porosity because it is composed of microscopically small, hollow particles. Diatomaceous earth (sometimes referred to by trademarked brand names such as Celite) is used in chemistry as a filtration aid, to increase flow rate, and filter very fine particles that would otherwise pass through or clog filter paper. It is also used to filter water, particularly in the drinking water treatment process and in fish tanks, and other liquids, such as beer and wine. It can also filter syrups, sugar, and honey without removing or altering their color, taste, or nutritional properties.

=== Abrasive ===
The oldest use of diatomite is as a very mild abrasive and has been used in toothpaste, metal polishes, and some facial scrubs.

=== Pest control ===
Diatomite is of value as an insecticide because of its abrasive and physico-sorptive properties. The fine powder adsorbs lipids from the waxy outer layer of the exoskeletons of many species of insects. This layer acts as a barrier that resists the loss of water vapour from the insect's body. Damaging the layer increases the evaporation of water from their bodies, so that they dehydrate, often fatally.

This also works against gastropods and is commonly employed in gardening to defeat slugs. However, since slugs inhabit humid environments, efficacy is low. Diatomaceous earth is sometimes mixed with an attractant or other additives to increase its effectiveness.

The shape of diatoms has not been proven to affect their functionality as regarding adsorption of lipids. However, certain applications, such as that for slugs and snails, work best when a particularly shaped diatom is used, suggesting that lipid adsorption is not the only factor involved. For example, in the case of slugs and snails, large, spiny diatoms work best to lacerate the epithelium of the mollusk. Diatom shells will work to some degree on the vast majority of animals that undergo ecdysis in shedding cuticle, such as arthropods or nematodes. It also may have other effects on lophotrochozoans, such as mollusks or annelids.

Medical-grade diatomite has been studied for its efficacy as a deworming agent in cattle; in both studies cited the groups being treated with diatomaceous earth did not fare any better than control groups. It is commonly used in lieu of boric acid and can be used to help control and possibly eliminate bed bugs, house dust mite, cockroach, ant, and flea infestations.

Diatomaceous earth is widely applied for insect control in grain storage. It is used to control cannibalistic behaviors in confused flour beetles, which infest flour storages.

To be effective as an insecticide, diatomaceous earth must have a mean particle size below about 12 μm (i.e., food grade—see below); and it must be uncalcinated (i.e., it must not be heat-treated prior to application).

Although considered to be relatively low-risk, pesticides containing diatomaceous earth are not exempt from regulation in the United States under the Federal Insecticide, Fungicide, and Rodenticide Act and must be registered with the Environmental Protection Agency.

=== Thermal ===
Its thermal properties enable it to be used as the barrier material in some fire-resistant safes. It is also used in evacuated powder insulation for use with cryogenics. Diatomaceous earth powder is inserted into the vacuum space to aid in the effectiveness of vacuum insulation. It was used in the classical AGA cookers as a thermal heat barrier.

=== Catalyst support ===
Diatomaceous earth also finds some use as a support for catalysts, generally serving to maximize a catalyst's surface area and activity. For example, nickel can be supported on the material—the combination is called Ni–Kieselgur—to improve its activity as a hydrogenation catalyst.

=== Agriculture ===
Natural freshwater diatomaceous earth is used in agriculture for grain storage as an anticaking agent, as well as an insecticide. It is approved by the U.S. Food and Drug Administration as a feed additive to prevent caking.

Some believe it may be used as a natural anthelmintic (dewormer), although studies have not shown it to be effective. Some farmers add it to their livestock and poultry feed to prevent the caking of feed. "Food-Grade Diatomaceous Earth" is widely available in agricultural feed supply stores.

Freshwater diatomite can be used as a growing medium in hydroponic gardens.

It is also used as a growing medium in potted plants, particularly as bonsai soil. Bonsai enthusiasts use it as a soil additive, or pot a bonsai tree in 100% diatomaceous earth. In vegetable gardening it is sometimes used as a soil conditioner, because like perlite, vermiculite, and expanded clay, it retains water and nutrients, while draining fast and freely, allowing high oxygen circulation within the growing medium.

=== Marker in livestock nutrition experiments ===
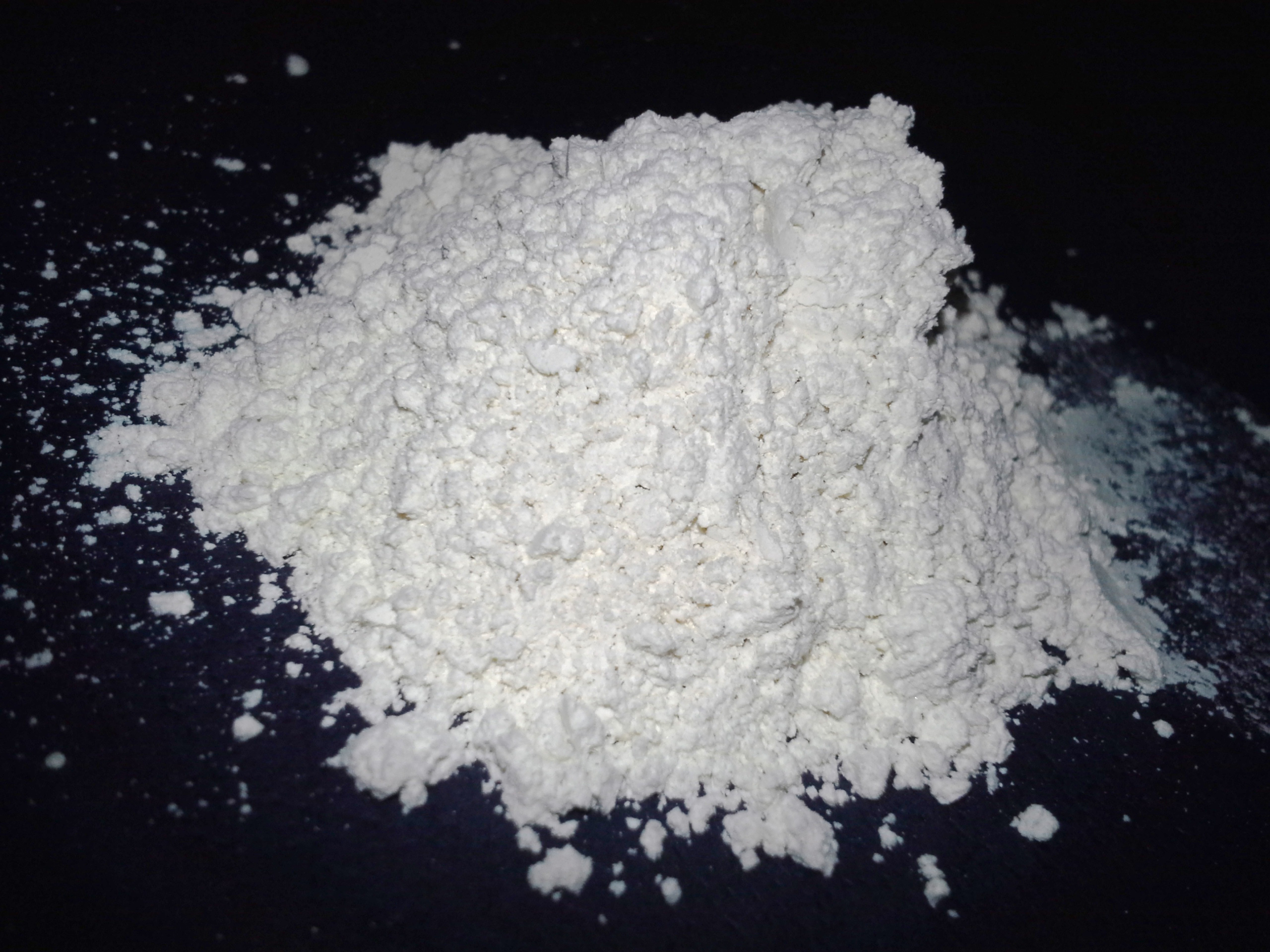
A sample of food-grade diatomaceous earth

Natural dried, not calcinated diatomaceous earth is regularly used in livestock nutrition research as a source of acid-insoluble ash (AIA), which is used as an indigestible marker. By measuring the content of AIA relative to nutrients in test diets and feces or digesta sampled from the terminal ileum (last third of the small intestine) the percentage of that nutrient digested can be calculated using the following equation:

$N = \left ( 1 - \frac{N_f}{N_F} \times \frac{A_F}{A_f} \right ) \times 100$

where:

N is the nutrient digestibility (%)
N_{f} is the amount of nutrients in the feces (%)
N_{F} is the amount of nutrients in the feed (%)
A_{f} is the amount of AIA in the feces (%)
A_{F} is the amount of AIA in the feed (%)

Natural freshwater diatomaceous earth is preferred by many researchers over chromic oxide, which has been widely used for the same purpose, the latter being a known carcinogen and, therefore, a potential hazard to research personnel.

=== Construction ===
Spent diatomaceous earth from the brewing process can be added to ceramic mass for the production of red bricks with higher open porosity.

Diatomaceous earth is considered a prominent inorganic non-metallic material that can be used for the production of various ceramics, including production of porous ceramics under low temperature hydrothermal technology.

=== Home goods ===
Diatomaceous earth (DE) is used in some home products where dryness or the ability to wick away moisture is needed. In particular there are bath mats made of DE which absorb water from the bather and allow it to spread the material and rapidly evaporate. There are also spoons made of DE for scooping sugar and other hygroscopic kitchen ingredients.

== Specific varieties ==
- Tripolite is the variety found in Tripoli, Libya.
- Bann clay is the variety found in the Lower Bann valley in Northern Ireland.
- Moler (mo-clay) is the variety found in northwestern Denmark, especially on the islands of Fur and Mors.
- Freshwater-derived food grade diatomaceous earth is the type used in United States agriculture for grain storage, as feed supplement, and as an insecticide. It is produced uncalcinated, has a very fine particle size, and is very low in crystal silica (<2%).
- Salt-water-derived pool / beer / wine filter grade is not suitable for human consumption or effective as an insecticide. Usually calcinated before being sold to remove impurities and undesirable volatile contents, it is composed of larger particles than the freshwater version and has a high crystalline silica content (>60%).

== Microbial degradation ==
Certain species of bacteria in oceans and lakes can accelerate the rate of dissolution of silica in dead and living diatoms by using hydrolytic enzymes to break down the organic algal material.

== Climatologic importance ==
The Earth's climate is affected by dust in the atmosphere, so locating major sources of atmospheric dust is important for climatology. Research indicates that surface deposits of diatomaceous earth play an important role. Research shows that significant dust comes from the Bodélé Depression in Chad, where storms push diatomite gravel over dunes, generating dust by abrasion.

== Safety considerations ==
Inhalation of crystalline silica harms the lungs, causing silicosis. Amorphous silica is considered to have low toxicity, but prolonged inhalation causes lung changes. Diatomaceous earth is mainly amorphous silica but contains some crystalline silica, especially in the saltwater forms. In a 1978 study of workers, those exposed to natural diatomaceous earth for over five years had no significant lung changes while 40% of those exposed to the calcined form had developed pneumoconiosis. Today's standard diatomaceous earth formulations are safer to use, as they are predominantly made of amorphous silica and contain little or no crystalline silica.

The crystalline silica content of diatomaceous earth is regulated in the United States by the Occupational Safety and Health Administration (OSHA). There are guidelines from the National Institute for Occupational Safety and Health that set maximum amounts allowable in the product (1%) and in the air near the breathing zone of workers, with a recommended exposure limit at 6 mg/m^{3} over an 8-hour workday. OSHA has set a permissible exposure limit for diatomaceous earth as 20 mppcf (80 mg/m^{3}/%SiO_{2}). At levels of 3,000 mg/m^{3}, diatomaceous earth is immediately dangerous to life and health.

In the 1930s, workers with long-term occupational exposure in the cristobalite diatomaceous earth industry who were exposed to high levels of airborne crystalline silica over decades were found to have an increased risk of silicosis.

Diatomite produced for pool filters is treated with high heat (calcination) and a fluxing agent (soda ash), causing the formerly harmless amorphous silicon dioxide to assume its crystalline form.

== See also ==
- Aerogel – Synthetic ultralight solid
- Biomineralization – Process by which living organisms produce minerals
- Fuller's earth – Any clay material that can decolorise oil or other liquids
- Perlite – Amorphous volcanic glass
- Rock flour – Glacier-generated sediment
- Siliceous ooze – Biogenic pelagic sediment located on the deep ocean floor
- Zeolite – Microporous, aluminosilicate mineral group
