= Solomon Hills =

Mountain range in California, United States

- Location within California Location within the United States

Highest point
- Elevation: 401 m (1,316 ft)

Geography
- Country: United States
- State: California
- District: Santa Barbara County
- Range coordinates: 34°50′5.929″N 120°22′59.579″W
- Topo map: USGS Orcutt

The Solomon Hills are a low mountain range in the western Transverse Ranges, in northern Santa Barbara County, California. The Hills separate the Santa Maria Valley and Santa Maria to the north, from the Los Alamos Valley and the Santa Ynez Valley to the south.

== History ==
The Solomon Hills are named for Salomon Pico, the 19th century Mexican—Californio patriot and bandit of Alta California, that is said to have ambushed, robbed and killed many of his victims in the area between 1849 and 1852.

The Orcutt Oil Field, discovered in 1901, occupies the westernmost portion of the Solomon Hills range.
