= Mesa Oil Field =

Abandoned oil field in Santa Barbara, California

Coordinates: 34.3997°N 119.7111°W

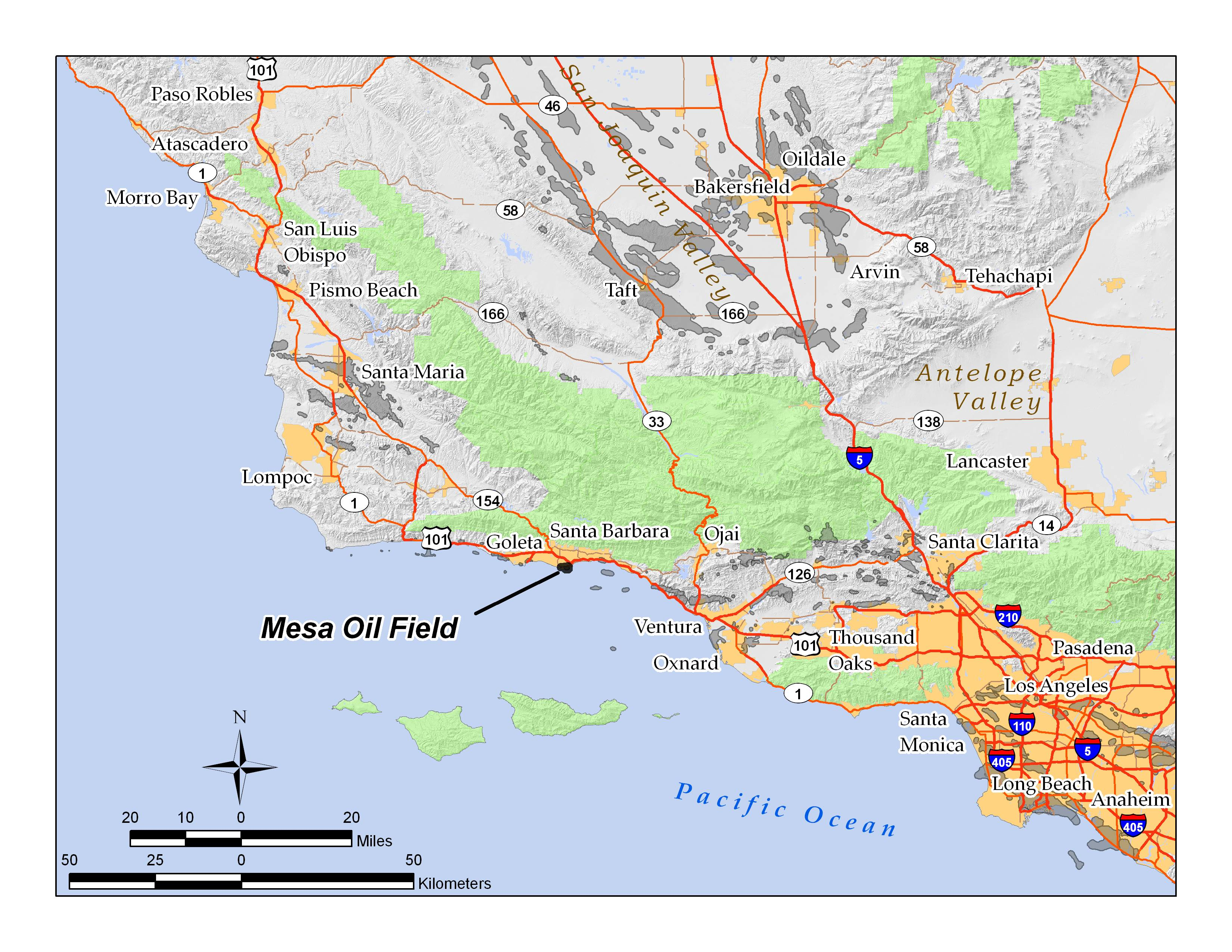
- The Mesa Oil Field in Santa Barbara County, California. Other oil fields are shown in light gray.
- Country: United States
- Region: Santa Barbara south coast
- Location: Santa Barbara County, California
- Offshore/onshore: onshore
- Operators: Town-lot field; numerous small operators

Field history
- Discovery: 1929
- Start of development: 1929
- Start of production: 1929
- Peak year: 1935
- Abandonment: 1976

Production
- Estimated oil in place: 3.7 million barrels (~5.0×10^{5} t)
- Producing formations: Vaqueros Sandstone (Lower Miocene)

The Mesa Oil Field is an abandoned oil field entirely within the city limits of Santa Barbara, California, in the United States. Discovered in 1929, it was quickly developed and quickly declined, as it proved to be but a relatively small accumulation of oil in a single geological formation. While the field was active in the 1930s, residential development in most of the Mesa neighborhood of Santa Barbara came to a halt. The field included two major productive areas with a total surface extent of only 210 acres (0.85 km^{2}), and produced 3,700,000 barrels (590,000 m^{3}) of oil during its brief lifetime.

== Geographic setting ==
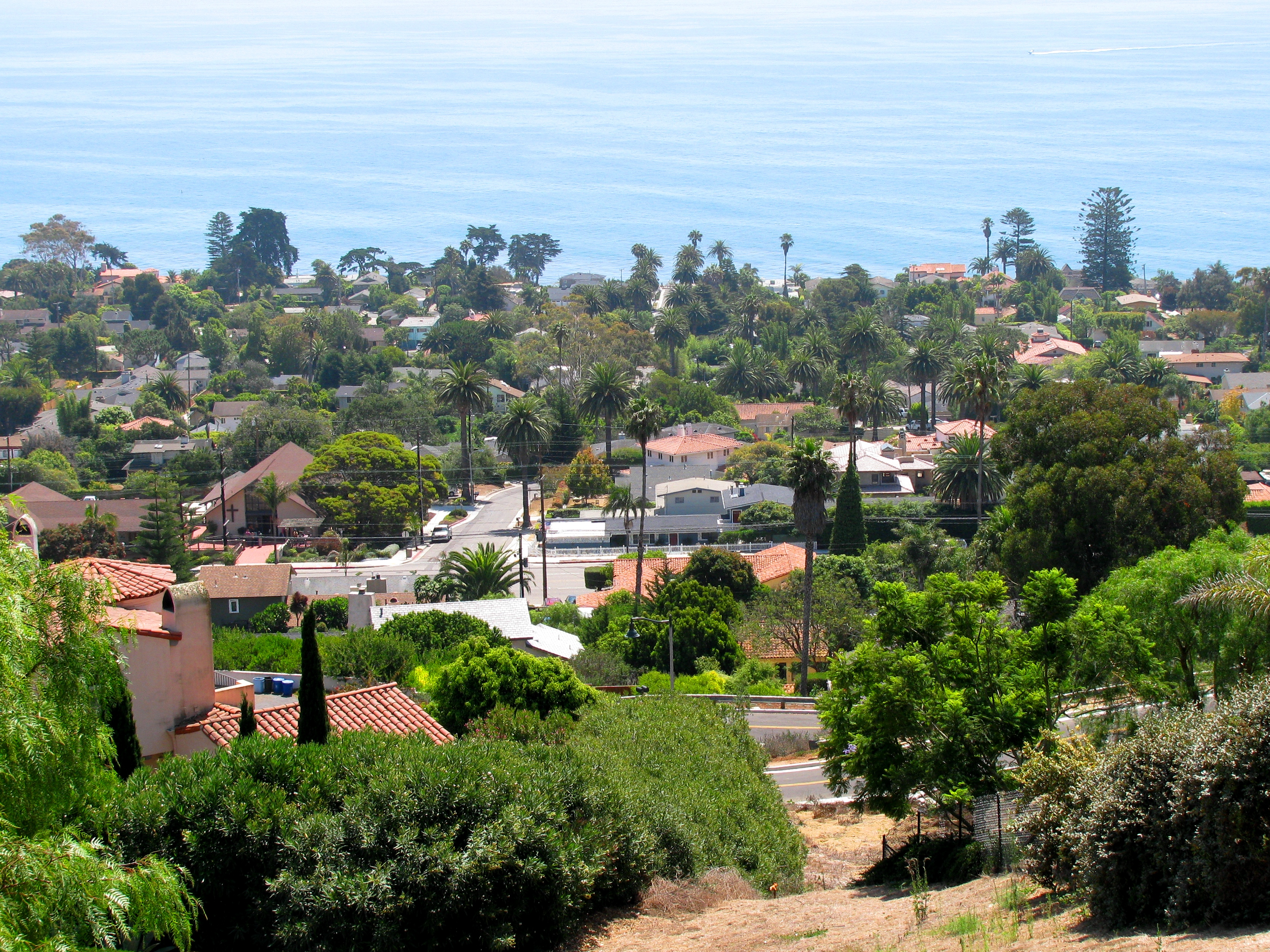
The Mesa neighborhood of Santa Barbara, showing the approximate center of the field's main area of production. In the 1930s there were no houses here, but dozens of oil derricks.

The field occupied a small area on a mesa to the west of the Santa Barbara Harbor, within the limits of the City of Santa Barbara, now the location of the neighborhood known as "The Mesa". The mesa from which the neighborhood takes its name is about two miles (3.2 km) long from west to east and about 3,000 feet (910 m) across from north to south. The northern boundary is Lavigia Hill, which rises north of Cliff Drive; some of the oil wells were drilled on the southern slopes. The southern boundary of the mesa is the abrupt drop-off at the cliff overlooking the ocean. The cliffs rise 120 feet (37 m) above the beach at the western end of the mesa, gradually diminishing in height to only 40 feet (12 m) at the eastern end, near Santa Barbara City College. Prior to the oil field being developed, the flat top of the mesa was farmland, with one imposing former residence, the abandoned and earthquake-damaged "Dibblee Castle" built at the eastern end, overlooking Santa Barbara harbor.

Climate in the area is Mediterranean, with mild, sometimes rainy winters and dry summers, with the temperature moderated by ocean breezes and a morning marine layer. Freezes are extremely rare. Mean annual temperature is approximately 60 °F (16 °C), and the growing season is year-round.

Numerous other oil fields exist within the region. The Summerland Oil Field, location of the world's first offshore oil wells into the ocean, is about seven miles (11 km) to the east of the field; the large Ellwood Oil Field is about ten miles (16 km) to the west. Approximately seven miles to the southeast in the Santa Barbara Channel is the Dos Cuadras Oil Field, source of the 1969 Santa Barbara oil spill.

== Geology ==
The structure of the Mesa field is relatively simple. Oil was trapped in two anticlinal structures in a band of the porous Miocene-age Vaqueros Sandstone formation, at a depth of between 2,000 and 2,500 feet (760 m). The two oil accumulations were about two-thirds of a mile apart horizontally, and around the same depth. Trapping the oil was the overlying impermeable Rincon Shale, also of Miocene age, and above that unit is the Monterey Formation. A thin layer of Pleistocene sediments known as the Santa Barbara Formation lies between the Monterey and ground surface. Underneath the Vaqueros formation and separated by an unconformity is the Oligocene-age Sespe Formation; no oil has been found in or beneath this unit, even though one well had been drilled into it to a total depth of over 10,000 feet (3,000 m). The Sespe and Vaqueros Formations together form the second-most-prolific oil-producing unit in Southern California.

Oil from the Mesa field was medium to heavy. Early reports give a value of 17 to 18 degrees Baumé; the California Department of Natural Resources reports the same oil as having API gravity of 20 to 24. Sulfur content was 0.45 percent. As its quality was relatively low, it was mainly used for fuel oil, road oil and asphalt.

Wells rarely produced for long, and a common experience of operators was fast production when the well first hit the oil-bearing sandstone, followed by swift decline, with late production mostly water. The overall structure of the field was imperfectly understood, with some wells producing poorly near to better producers; some geologists attributed such discrepancies to faulting not visible in well cores, and others to impermeable sand lenses in the Vaqueros. Total recoverable oil was limited since oil appeared only in one relatively thin rock formation, and even the more productive wells became uneconomic to operate within a few years of their drilling.

== History, production, and operations ==
The Mesa field was discovered during a time in California history when oil exploration and drilling was virtually unregulated. When oil was found it was typically developed to the maximum extent possible given the constraints of technology. Cities such as Los Angeles are built over numerous large oil fields, and smaller cities like Ventura and Santa Maria grew with the petroleum industry being the primary economic driver. Santa Barbara alone of the cities in the region opposed the development of oil fields within its boundaries, with most of the population seeing the industry as incompatible with the town's character with regard to aesthetic and environmental values. In the 1890s and 1900s The Summerland Oil Field sprouted hundreds of oil derricks on the beach and along piers into the surf, just five miles (8.0 km) east of the Santa Barbara city boundary; its westward expansion occasioned a midnight raid by a party of vigilantes, led by Reginald Fernald, son of newspaper publisher Charles Fernald, who tore down one of the derricks that had just been built on Miramar Beach.

The first well drilled in the Mesa area was by Puritan Oil Co. in 1922, at 601 Flora Vista Drive. It was a wildcat well, and while not commercially viable and quickly abandoned, suggested to prospectors that it was worth looking more carefully for oil in the vicinity.

The discovery of the giant Ellwood Oil Field in 1929 in a similar geographic setting – a blufftop mesa twelve miles (19 km) west of Santa Barbara – commenced a frenzy of wildcat well drilling along the entire coastline from Carpinteria to Gaviota. It was during this burst of activity that the discovery well for the Mesa field was put in, May 1929, by Olympic Refining Company in the Palisades residential tract, near the intersection of Mohawk Drive and Hudson Road. By the end of the summer, there were 31 oil wells in this small area, just recently subdivided into residential lots. These wells went dry quickly, and the area was abandoned by the next summer, having only produced 20,909 barrels (3,324.3 m^{3}) of oil in all. However, residential construction stopped completely; wooden derricks sprung up on many of the small adjacent lots. The sight of these derricks, plainly visible from Santa Barbara harbor, occasioned the first anti-oil protest within the city of Santa Barbara, but since an ordinance had been enacted specifically allowing oil production on the Mesa, which had only recently been considered for residential development, the protests failed to stop drilling and development.

Three months after the abandonment of the Palisades area, in September 1930, drillers discovered the much more productive Vista del Oceano area, about two-thirds of a mile east of Palisades along Cliff Drive and on the hillside overlooking the Mesa and the ocean (hence the name). An even more productive area, Fair Acres, came online in March 1934 south of Cliff Drive, extending south across the Mesa all the way to the bluffs overlooking the beach. Sixty-five wells were drilled in the Fair Acres area by 1940. The most prolific producer was well "Cole No. 1" which flowed at an uncontrolled 1,500 barrels per day (240 m^{3}/d) into an open sump for two weeks, before being placed on production at around one-tenth of that rate. As the Fair Acres and Vista del Oceano areas are adjacent and not geologically distinct, the California Department of Conservation lumps them together into a single area dubbed the "Main Area".

The Mesa field was entirely developed by small operators. As the land was subdivided into parcels before oil was discovered, it was a "town-lot" field, and parcel owners were able to drill on their own land without regard for the optimum spacing of wells on a field-wide basis (well spacing is now more tightly regulated in California). In 1934 there were 34 separate operators on 35 leases; the largest operator had only six wells.

Even the best-producing wells began to peter out by the late 1930s, and by 1940 only 22 wells out of 107 drilled were still producing, at an average rate of about 10 barrels per day (1.6 m^{3}/d). The field had not been particularly profitable. According to S.G. Dolman, writing in 1940, "... It is doubtful if the field has returned in dividends the money invested. Like most town-lot fields, there are 10 wells where one would have sufficed." Residential construction resumed after the Second World War, as wells were abandoned and sumps filled. The last well was capped in 1972 and the field formally abandoned in 1976.
