= Geology of Bonaire =

The island of Bonaire began to form as part of the Lesser Antilles island arc in the past 145 million years, beginning in the Cretaceous. The island has been submerged or partially submerged for much of its existence, forming large limestone and sedimentary rock formations, atop a thick basement of volcanic rocks.

== Stratigraphy and geologic history ==
The Washikemba Formation and Rincon Formation are the two oldest rock formations on Bonaire, both dating to the Cretaceous. The Washikemba Formation is five kilometers thick and contains basalt pillow lava formed as lava rapidly cooled in seawater, as well as submarine pyroclastic flows and some ammonite fossils in sedimentary rocks formed in a deep water environment. In addition to basalt, there is also rhyolite and basaltic andesite. Together, the formation was affected by low-grade metamorphism and primary minerals such as pyroxene, plagioclase and hornblende altered to prehnite, pumpellyite and zeolite. The Rincon Formation is a 30-meter succession of marl and calcareous sandstone outcropping in the center of the island and is faulted from the Washikemba Formation, making their exact relationship difficult to determine. It contains Maastrichtian Late Cretaceous shallow water fossils such as foraminifera, algae, gastropods, bivalves and rudists.

=== Cenozoic (66 million years ago-present) ===
The Paleocene Soebi Blanco Formation is a 400-meter thick sequence of conglomerates, sandstones and mudstones at Seroe Largo in central Bonaire. It is similar to the Midden Curacao Formation in that it contains fragments of exotic rock not found in the area, such as quartzite, gneiss and schist. Uranium-lead dating gives an age of 1.15 billion years old on zircon fragments within a granulite pebble from the formation, suggesting that it is eroded material from much older rock in South America. In other cases, fragments of Cretaceous limestone are included as well.

Outcropping southwest of Montagne is the Eocene Montagne Formation, made up of yellow, weathering limestones. A lower limestone unit contains molluscs while an upper unit includes echinoids and large foramina. The Seroe Domi Formation spans Bonaire and neighboring Curacao and Aruba. Its base is volcanic breccia but on Bonaire contains Miocene fossils not found on the other islands. The largely dolomite formation seems to have formed in a deep reef offshore environment. Five limestone terrace formed during the past 2.5 million years of the Quaternary.
