= James P. Kennett =

American paleoceanographer

- Born: James Peter Kennett; September 3, 1940 (age 86); Wellington
- Other name: Jim
- Known for: Paleoceanography; Younger Dryas impact hypothesis
- Spouse: Diana Kennett
- Children: Douglas J Kennett
- Scientific career
- Fields: Paleoceanography
- Workplaces: University of California Santa Barbara
- Thesis: The Kapitean Stage (Upper Miocene) of New Zealand (1965)
- Doctoral advisor: Paul Vella
- Doctoral students: Tessa M. Hill
- Website: kennett.faculty.geol.ucsb.edu

James Peter Kennett is an American paleoceanographer.

Kennet has a PhD from Victoria University of Wellington, with a thesis on the Kapitean Stage in New Zealand. In 1986, Kennett became the founding editor of Paleoceanography, and in May 2000, he was elected as a member of the National Academy of Sciences.

In 1972, Kennett was one of the co-chief scientist of the Deep Sea Drilling Project. In the 1980s he published a book on marine geology, founded the journal Paleoceanography, and served as the Director of the Marine Science Institute. His studies on the contribution of methane to climatic shifts were published in 2002, but were not widely accepted by the climate community.

He is a cofounder and member of the Comet Research Group (CRG), and is known for his contributions to the controversial and refuted Younger Dryas impact hypothesis which asserts that the Clovis culture was destroyed by a shower of comets.

He co-authored a paper in collaboration with biblical archaeologists, who believed to have discovered the ancient city of Sodom and evidence of its destruction by a comet at Tell el-Hammam, Jordon. The paper was retracted by Nature in 2025, citing concerns about methodology, analysis, and data interpretation.

He is the founding editor of the journal Paleoceanography. He is also the author of the textbook Marine Geology, which integrates plate tectonics with Earth’s environmental evolution as recorded in ocean sediments.
