= Tessa M. Hill =

Oceanographer, researcher

Tessa Michelle Hill
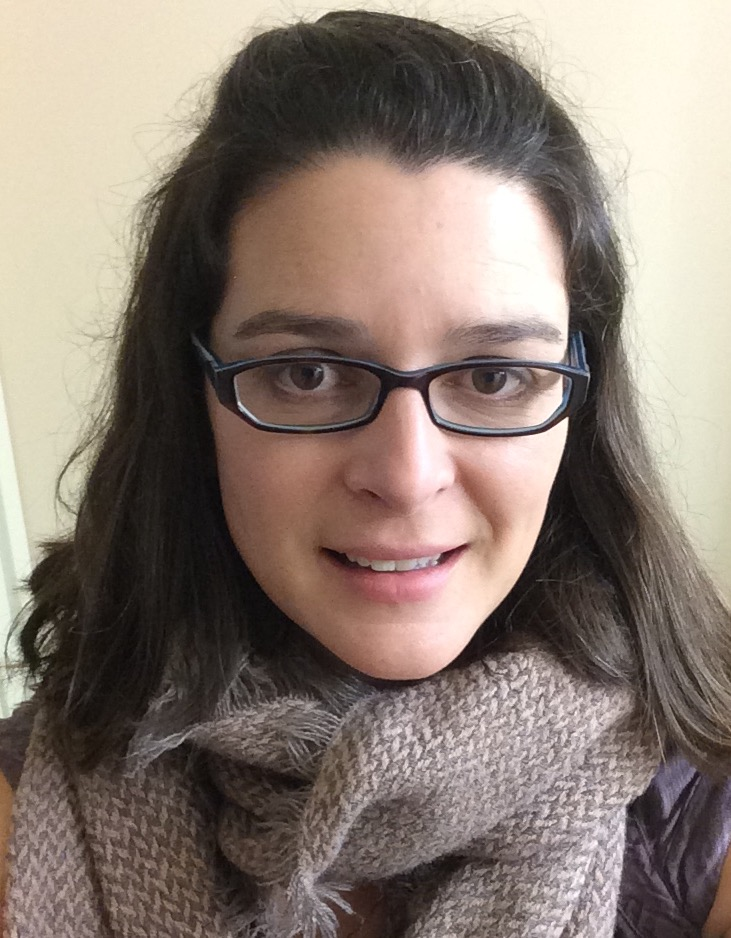
- Hill in 2016
- Born: Tacoma, Washington, USA
- Education: University of California, Santa Barbara
- Known for: ocean acidification, methane cycle in the ocean, climate change and the ocean, outreach to the public and K-12
- Awards: National Science Foundation CAREER Awards; US Presidential Early Career Award for Scientists and Engineers PECASE
- Scientific career
- Fields: marine geology; oceanography; micropaleontology; biogeochemistry
- Workplaces: University of California, Davis
- Doctoral advisor: James P. Kennett
- Website: bml.ucdavis.edu/research/faculty/tessa-hill

Tessa Michelle Hill is an American marine geochemist and oceanographer. She is a professor at the University of California, Davis, and a resident professor at its Bodega Marine Laboratory. She is a Fellow of the California Academy of Sciences, and in 2016 was named a Leshner Public Engagement Fellow of the American Association for the Advancement of Science. In that year she also received the US Presidential Early Career Award for Scientists and Engineers (PECASE).

Her research and wider public influence focuses on the effects of climate change on the global ocean, including ocean acidification.

== Early life and education ==
Hill was born in Tacoma, Washington, U.S. and raised in the Pacific Northwest, where she attended Stadium High School. She gained a Bachelor in Science degree in marine science from Eckerd College. After graduating she studied marine micropaleontology and climate change at UC Santa Barbara. After receiving her Ph.D. in 2004 she was given a University of California President's Postdoctoral Fellowship at UC Davis for two years, before joining its faculty of the Earth and Planetary Sciences department.

== Research areas ==
Hill's research includes methane in the ocean (methane in hydrocarbon seeps, and clathrate dissociation), changing ocean oxygenation and the effects of a warmer more acidic ocean on bivalves, coral, and foraminifera.

=== Methane in the Ocean ===
Early in her career, Hill investigated the role of oceanic methane sources in modifying environments at the sea floor and releasing methane to the water column and atmosphere. This work utilized modern methane seep environments to investigate the biological and chemical responses to methane. It included reconstructing past intervals of methane and hydrocarbon seepage on the California margin.

=== Ocean acidification ===
At Bodega Marine Laboratory (near Bodega Head), Hill and colleagues studied the effect of ocean acidification in the natural laboratory of the California continental margin. Here, upwelling of carbon dioxide-rich water seasonally decreases the pH in local marine environments. One theory about this region is that local fauna would be well adapted to acidic (low pH) water. Hill and colleagues have shown that acidic waters have an adverse impact on growth characteristics of the protozoan zooplankton foraminifera, oysters, and mussels. Oysters and mussels play an important role as foundation species in marine ecosystems, and zooplankton are an important source of food for many organisms. These findings indicate that ocean acidification may have a significant impact on California marine ecosystems.

Hill has been a contributing author to several governmental reports on ocean acidification and climate impacts, including the West Coast Ocean Acidification & Hypoxia Panel, Indicators of Climate Change in California, and the Fourth Climate Assessment for California.

=== Past climate change and the ocean ===
Hill has utilized records of climate to understand how temperature, productivity, and oxygen changes in the past have influenced ocean ecosystems. Hill utilizes deep sea corals to reconstruct changes in the ocean through hundreds of years. Hill uses microfossils in sediment cores to understand how the ocean has changed over thousands of years, including dramatic temperature and oxygen changes associated with the transition from Earth's most recent glaciation to the modern, warmer climate. Hill and colleague Eric Simons have written a book that provides a comprehensive review of the impact of climate change on the health of the global ocean and the efforts of a broad spectrum of people to address it.

== Awards and honors ==
Tessa Hill earned a US National Science Foundation CAREER award in 2013 for her research on marine ecosystem shifts due to climate change, and her work to integrate climate science into K-12 education.

In 2014 she was elected Fellow of the California Academy of Sciences. She was named a Leshner Public Engagement Fellow of the American Association for the Advancement of Science in 2016.

Also in 2016, Hill received the US Presidential Early Career Award for Scientists and Engineers (PECASE). The PECASE citation reads:

For her transdisciplinary research that places modern ocean acidification and ocean oxygenation into a long-term Earth-system context, and for training and outreach to K-12 teachers and students that offers them a better understanding of ocean science and climate change through inquiry-based learning.

== Public engagement on scientific research ==
=== Outreach ===
In May 2017, Hill was invited to give the Rosenburg Institute Public Forum lecture at San Francisco State University and in May 2018 she gave the Riser Lecture at Northeastern University.

As part of a program supported by the National Science Foundation, Hill leads a program that trains future K-12 teachers in ocean, environmental and climate science. This program has supported curriculum development and research experiences for students in the Math and Science Teaching Program at UC Davis.

Hill serves on the Advisory Council for Cordell Bank National Marine Sanctuary, the Board of Trustees for the California Academy of Sciences and the Board of Trustees for the Society for Science and the Public.

=== Media ===
Tessa Hill's research has been featured in print and radio media on topics concerning climate science, deep sea corals, and ocean acidification. These include a New York Times opinion article, a radio interview on Science Friday, and an interview about the impacts of ocean acidification on shellfish on US National Public Radio (NPR). In addition, she has been profiled in a program featuring climate scientists on NPR.

An interview on corals appeared in Al Jazeera America. Hill published an Op Ed in the Santa Rosa, CA Press Democrat on the role of federal science funding in supporting innovation in the United States. She was profiled as a Scientist-to-Watch in The Scientist magazine, and is a regular contributor of essays and blogs including for the Union of Concerned Scientists.

== Selected works ==
- Benthic foraminifera of the Holocene transgressive west-central Florida inner shelf: paleoenvironmental implications. Marine Geology, v. 200, p. 263-272. Hill, T.M., Brooks, G.R., Duncan, D.S., Medioli, F.S. (2003).
- High-resolution records of methane hydrate dissociation: ODP Site 893, Santa Barbara Basin. Earth & Planetary Science Letters, v.223 (1–2), p. 127-140. Hill, T.M., Kennett, J.P., Spero, H.J. (2004).
- Isotopic evidence of methane-derived carbon into living foraminifera from modern methane seeps, Hydrate Ridge, OR. Geochimica et Cosmochimica Acta, v. 68 (22), p. 4619-4627. Hill, T.M., Kennett, J.P., Valentine D.L. (2004).
- Effects of carbon dioxide sequestration on California margin deep-sea foraminiferal assemblages. Marine Micropaleontology, v. 72, p. 165-175. Ricketts, E.R., Kennett, J.P., Hill, T.M., Barry, J.P. (2009).
- Temperature and vital effect controls on Bamboo Coral (Isididae) isotope geochemistry: A test of the “lines method”. Geochemistry, Geophysics, Geosystems, dos 10.1029/2010GC003443. Hill, T.M., Spero, H.J., Guilderson, T.P., LaVigne, M., Clague, D., Macalello, S., Jang, N. (2011).
- Glacial and deglacial sea floor methane emissions from pockmarks on the northern flank of the Storegga Slide complex. Geo-Marine Letters, dos: 10.1007/s00367-011-0258-7. Hill, T.M., Critser, R.B., Paull, C.K. (2011).
- Bamboo coral Ba/Ca: Calibration of a new deep ocean refractory nutrient proxy. Earth and Planetary Science Letters, 312: 506–515. LaVigne, M., Hill, T.M., Spero, H.J., Guilderson, T.P. (2011).
- High-resolution climate “windows” from Santa Barbara Basin: Investigations of Quaternary rapid change. Paleoceanography. v. 28, 1–14, doi: 10.1002/palo.20022. White, S.M., Hill, T.M., Kennett, J.P., Behl. R. (2013).
- Effects of increased pCO2 and geographic origin on purple sea urchin (Strongylocentrotus purpuratus) calcite elemental composition. Biogeosciences. v. 10, p. 3465-3477, dos: 10.5194/bg-10-3465-2013. LaVigne, M., Hill, T.M., Sanford, E., Gaylord, B., Russell A., Lenz, E., Young, M., Hosfelt, J. (2013).
- Vertical oxygen minimum zone oscillation during the last 20 ka in Santa Barbara Basin: A benthic foraminiferal perspective. Paleoceanography. v. 29, 1–14. dos: 10.1002/PA002483. Moffitt, S., Hill, T.M., Ohkushi, K., Kennett, J.P., Behl, R. (2014).
- Nighttime dissolution in a temperate coastal ocean ecosystem increases under acidification. Scientific Reports, dos: 10.1038/srep22984. *Kwiatowski, L., Gaylord, B.P., Hill, T., Hosfelt, J.D., Kroeker, K.J., Nebuchina, Y., Ninokawa, A., Russell, A.D., Rivest, E.B., Sesboue, M., Caldeira, K. (2016).
- Ocean acidification alters the response of intertidal snails to a key sea star predator. Proceedings of the Royal Society B, 20160890. https://dx.doi.org/10.1098/rspb.2016.0890. Jellison, B.M., Ninokawa, A.T., Hill, T.M., Sanford, E., Gaylord, B. (2016).
- Reproducibility of Ba/Ca variations recorded by northeast Pacific bamboo corals. Paleoceanography, v. 32 (9), 966–979. Serrato Marks, G., LaVigne, M., Hill, T.M., Sauthoff, W., Guilderson, T.P., Roark, E.B., Dunbar, R.B., Horner, T.J. (2017).
