= Coal Oil Point seep field =

Marine petroleum seep area near Goleta, California

Coordinates: 34°24′0″N 119°53′0″W

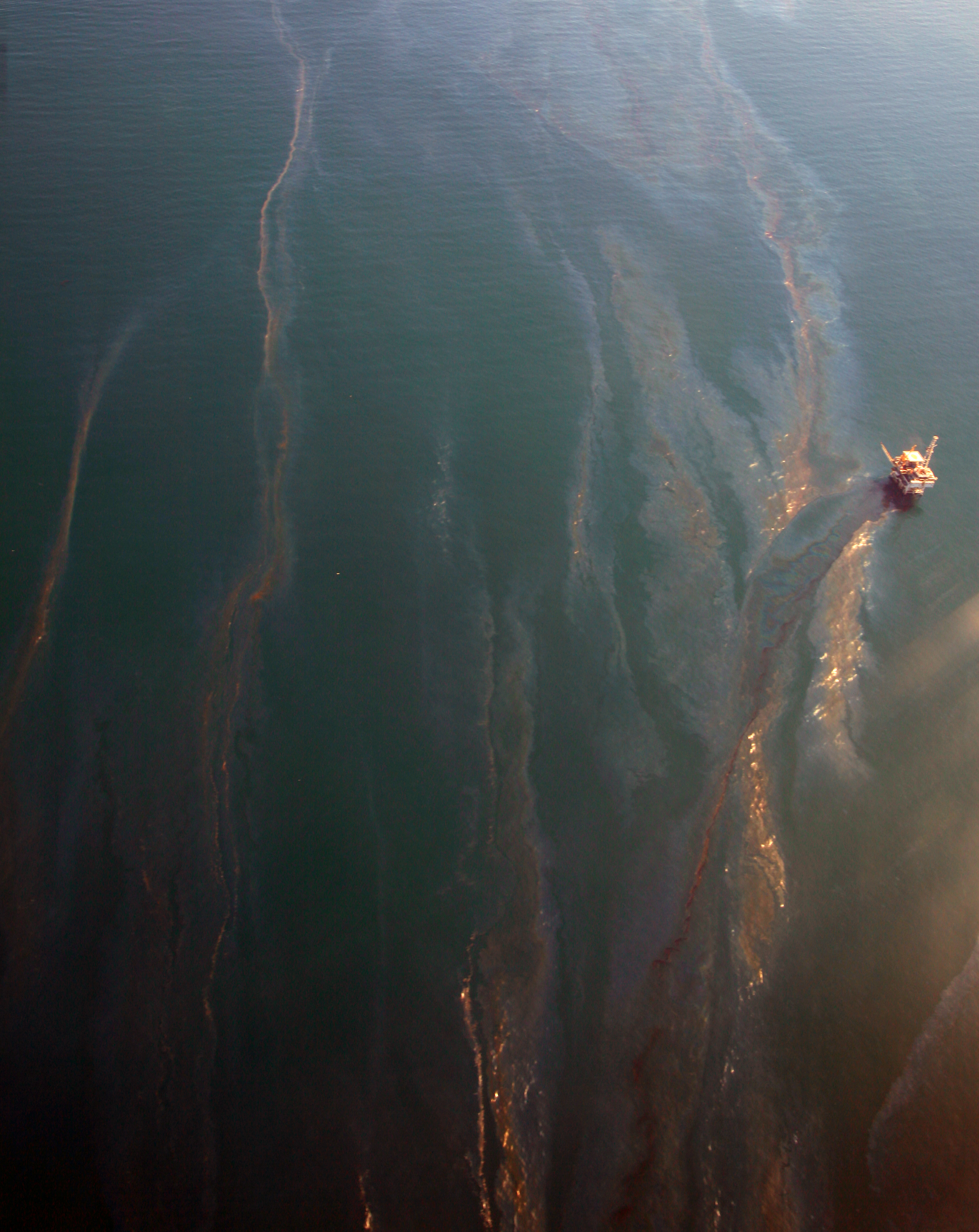
Platform Holly & oil slick in water, February 2016. Doc Searls, the photographer, a frequent flyer from SB, said this was more oil than he is used to seeing. Oil slicks increase after earthquakes.

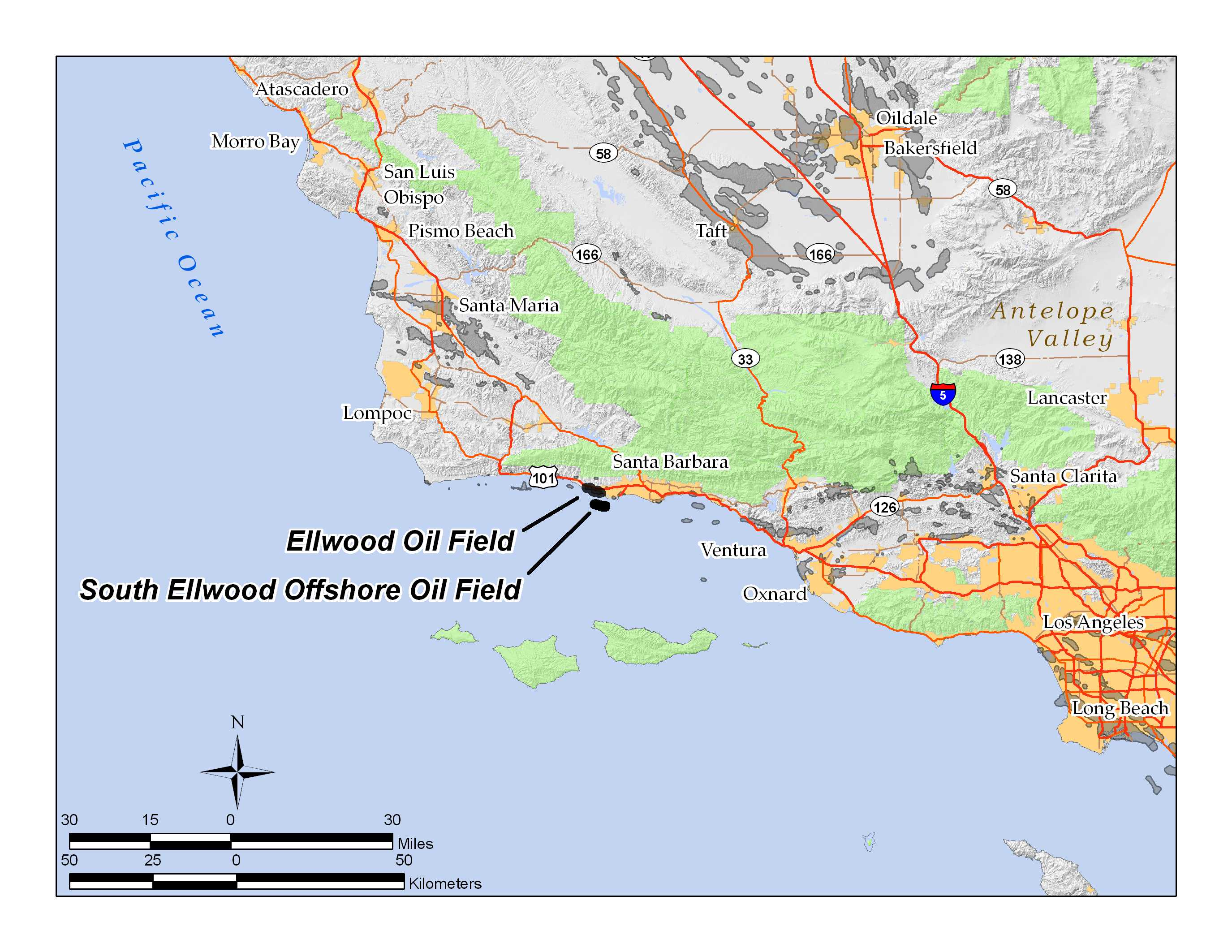
Ellwood Oil Fields, sources of the seeps

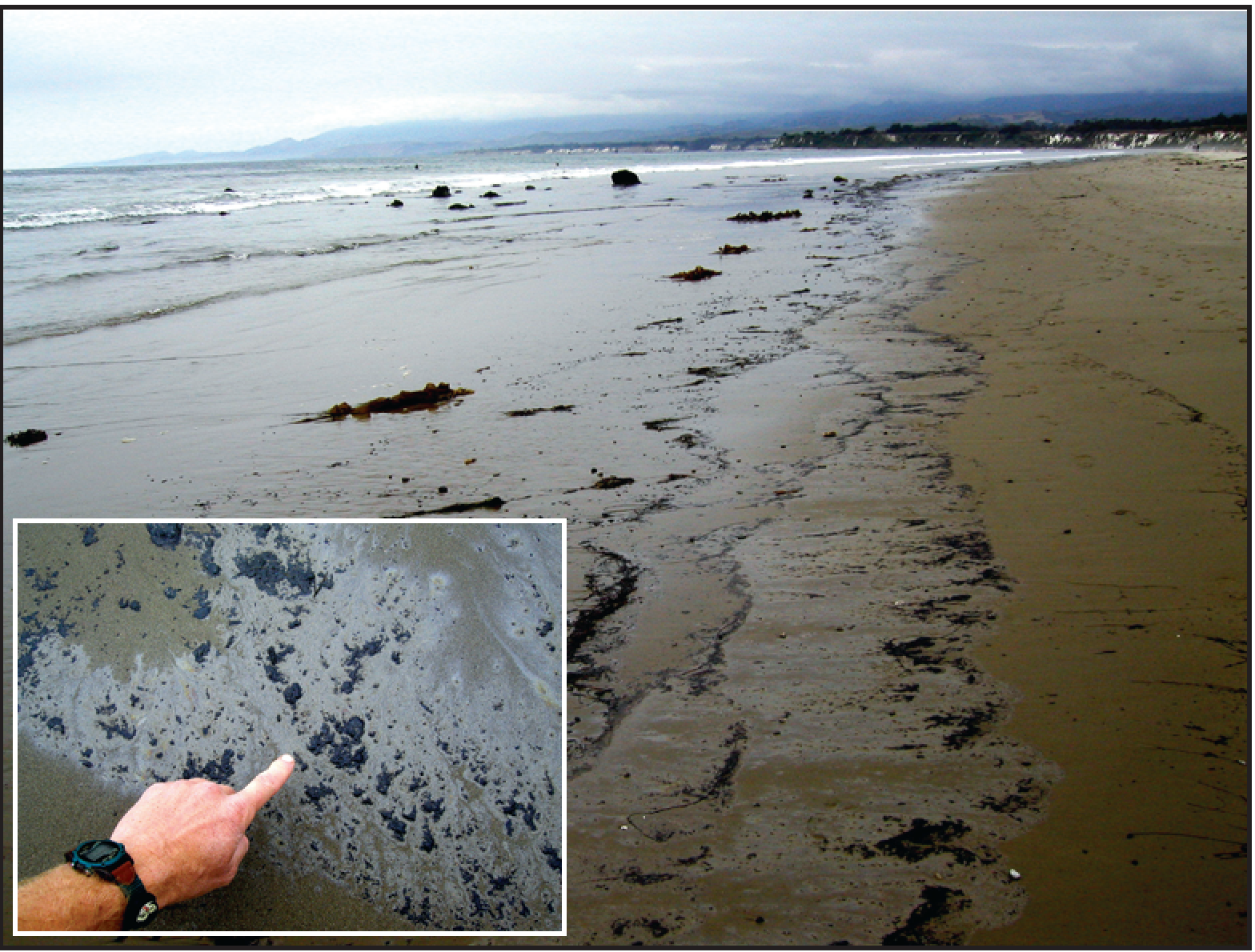
Tar balls at the beach, Coal Oil Point, looking WNW. This was an unusually heavy accumulation, in June 2003. Inset shows oily sheen from fresh tar balls.

The Coal Oil Point seep field (COP) in the Santa Barbara Channel offshore from Goleta, California, is a marine petroleum seep area of about three square kilometres, within the Offshore South Ellwood Oil Field and stretching from the coastline southward more than three kilometers (1.9 mi). Major seeps are located in water depths from 20 to 80 meters (66 to 262 ft). The seep field is among the largest and best studied areas of active marine seepage in the world. These perennial and continuous oil and gas seeps have been active on the northern edge of the Santa Barbara Channel for at least 500,000 years. The combined seeps in the field release about 40 tons of methane per day and about 19 tons of reactive organic gas (ethane, propane, butane and higher hydrocarbons); about twice the hydrocarbon air pollution released by all the cars and trucks in Santa Barbara County in 1990. The liquid petroleum produces a slick that is many kilometres long and when degraded by evaporation and weathering, produces tar balls which wash up on the beaches for miles around.

This seep also releases on the order of 100 to 150 barrels (16 to 24 m^{3}) of liquid petroleum per day. The field produces about 9 cubic meters of natural gas per barrel of petroleum.

Leakage from the natural seeps near Platform Holly, the production platform for the South Ellwood Offshore oilfield, has decreased substantially, probably from the decrease in reservoir pressure due to the oil and gas produced at the platform.

== History ==
Written records, dating from as early as 1792, describe effects of offshore seeps in the Santa Barbara Channel. Oil and tar "slicks" have long been a trademark of the area. In 1792, Captain Cook's navigator George Vancouver recorded on passing through the channel:

The surface of the sea, which was perfectly smooth and tranquil, was covered with a thick, slimy substance, which when separated or disturbed by a little agitation, became very luminous, whilst the light breeze, which came principally from the shore, brought with it a strong smell of tar, or some such resinous substance.

Archaeologists found that the mainland Chumash used asphalt from nearby onshore seeps in beach cliffs to seal their plank canoes and baskets. These seeps must be sourced from a similar subsurface reservoir system, but exposure to oxidation makes the material hard and useful.

In February 2019, a rare hoodwinker sunfish (Mola tecta) washed ashore on Sands Beach in the Coal Oil Point Reserve.

== Scientific Investigations ==
The location of the COP seep field offshore from the University of California, Santa Barbara (UCSB) has situated it as a natural laboratory for study of the phenomena of oil and gas introduced into the ocean from the sea bed, along with the role of geologic methane from seeps worldwide in the global methane budget. Since the 1990s almost a dozen UCSB researchers along with their graduate students have studied the geology, chemistry, oceanography and ecology of the marine seep system at COP. Many of these studies were in partnership with oil companies including Mobil and Venoco, which produced oil from reservoirs below the seeps, and the U.S. Geological Survey and California State Lands Commission.

The marine hydrocarbon seep system comprises a seabed source (vent) of oil and gas bubbles coated with oil, that transit the shallow water column while partially dissolving into the ocean. At the surface, various gases are discharged to the atmosphere and the oil volatilizes as it is transported by currents, leaving a tarry residue at the sea surface.

At the sea surface the seeps are marked by oil slicks, and in places, bubble froth. Since the 1970s and later, oil slicks from COP and others in the Santa Barbara Channel have been successfully mapped by remote sensing. Because the COP seeps are characterized by large visible gas bubble plumes they can be detected and mapped by sonar backscatter. The first attempts at this were made by Peter Fischer and colleagues of California State University, Northridge in the early 1970s. They produced reconnaissance level maps of bubble plumes at COP and at other locations in the Santa Barbara Channel. They noted that because the COP seeps were associated with a producing oil platform then operated by ARCO, continued oil production might result in a decrease in volume of seep discharge.

Scott Hornafius and Bruce Luyendyk, along with graduate student Derek Quigley made sonar surveys of the COP field two decades later using 50 kHz sonar and 3.5 kHz sonar equipment that matched that used by Fischer and colleagues. They calibrated the sonar data with seafloor artificial sources to estimate the volume of gas discharge cited above. Using an estimate of the gas/oil ratio along with capture of oil with a floating boom, they also estimated the volume of oil discharge (above). Comparing the surveys made in the mid 1990s with the early 1970s data of Fischer and colleagues they determined that seepage near the producing platform Holly had decreased by half. This observation was supported by gas capture data recorded by two sea floor tent structures that covered one large seepage area.

Surveys continued over the 1990s and 2000s using more sophisticated sonars including chirp and multibeam sonars. These repeat sonar surveys did not detect further decrease in seepage, while during the same period oil production continued.

== See also ==
- Refugio oil spill
- University of California Natural Reserve System
- Tessa M. Hill
