= Paleoceanography and Paleoclimatology =

Peer-reviewed scientific journal published by the American Geophysical Union

- Discipline: Paleoceanography, paleoclimatology
- Language: English
- Edited by: Matthew Huber, Ursula Röhl

Publication details
- Former name: Paleoceanography
- History: 1986–present
- Publisher: American Geophysical Union (United States)
- Frequency: Monthly
- Impact factor: 3.2 (2024)

Standard abbreviations
- ISO 4: Paleoceanogr. Paleoclimatol.

Indexing
- CODEN: POCGEP
- ISSN: 0883-8305 (print); 1944-9186 (web)
- LCCN: 94660715
- OCLC no.: 12224892

Links
- Journal homepage

Paleoceanography and Paleoclimatology is a peer-reviewed scientific journal published by the American Geophysical Union. It covers all aspects of understanding and reconstructing Earth's past climate and environments from the Precambrian to modern analogs.

The journal was established in 1986 as Paleoceanography and adopted its current title on 1 January 2018.

The founding editor-in-chief was James P. Kennett. The current editors are Matthew Huber (Purdue University) and Ursula Röhl (University of Bremen).

== Abstracting and indexing ==
The journal is abstracted and indexed in GEOBASE, GeoRef, Scopus, and several CSA databases. According to the Journal Citation Reports, the journal had a 2024 impact factor of 3.2.

== Notable articles ==
As of January 2014, the three most highly cited articles in the journal were:

- Lisiecki, Lorraine E.; Maureen E. Raymo (March 2005). "A Pliocene-Pleistocene stack of 57 globally distributed benthic δ^{18}O records". Paleoceanography. 20 (1): PA1003. Bibcode:2005PalOc..20.1003L. doi:10.1029/2004PA001071. hdl:2027.42/149224. S2CID 12788441.
- Martin, John H. (February 1990). "Glacial-interglacial CO_{2} change: The Iron Hypothesis". Paleoceanography. 5 (1): 1–13. Bibcode:1990PalOc...5....1M. doi:10.1029/PA005i001p00001.
- Duplessy, J. C.; N. J. Shackleton; R. G. Fairbanks; L. Labeyrie; Delia Oppo; N. Kallel (June 1988). "Deepwater source variations during the last climatic cycle and their impact on the global deepwater circulation" (PDF). Paleoceanography. 3 (3): 343–360. Bibcode:1988PalOc...3..343D. doi:10.1029/PA003i003p00343.
