= Vaqueros Formation =

Sedimentary geologic unit of Upper Oligocene and Lower Miocene in California

- Stratigraphic range: Late Oligocene-Early MioceneChattian–Aquitanian
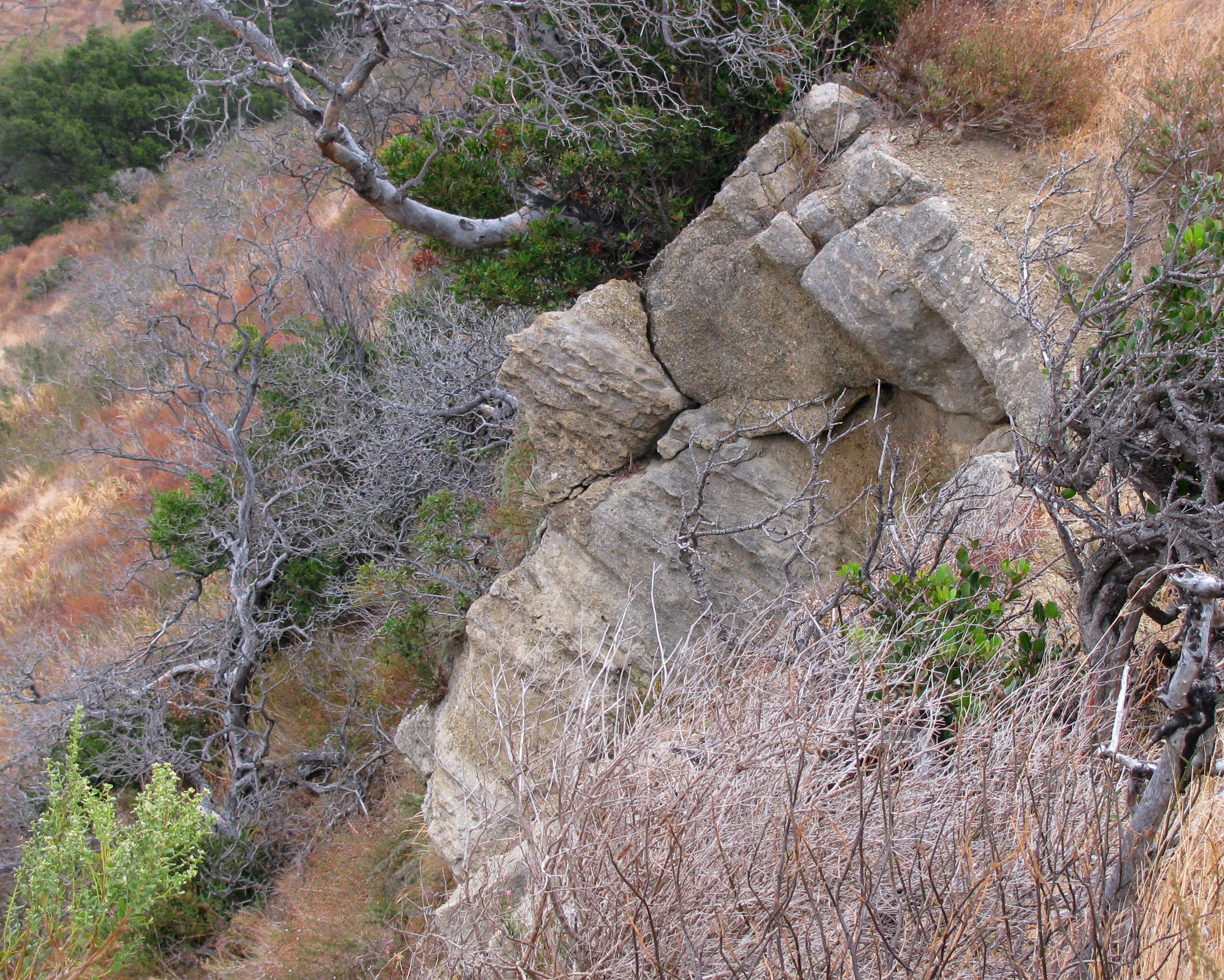
- Outcrop of the Vaqueros Formation in Gaviota State Park, California.
- Type: sedimentary
- Underlies: Rincon Formation, Monterey Formation
- Overlies: Sespe Formation, Kreyenhagen Formation
- Thickness: 0-500+ ft

Lithology
- Primary: sandstone

Location
- Region: Coastal California and the Central Valley
- Country: United States

Type section
- Named for: Vaqueros Canyon, Santa Lucia Mountains
- Named by: Hamlin (1904)

The Vaqueros Formation is a sedimentary geologic unit primarily of Upper Oligocene and Lower Miocene age, which is widespread on the California coast and coastal ranges in approximately the southern half of the state. It is predominantly a medium-grained sandstone unit, deposited in a shallow marine environment. Because of its high porosity and nearness to petroleum source rocks, in many places it is an oil-bearing unit, wherever it has been configured into structural or stratigraphic traps by folding and faulting. Being resistant to erosion, it forms dramatic outcrops in the coastal mountains. Its color ranges from grayish-green to light gray when freshly broken, and it weathers to a light brown or buff color.

== Type locality and deposition environment ==
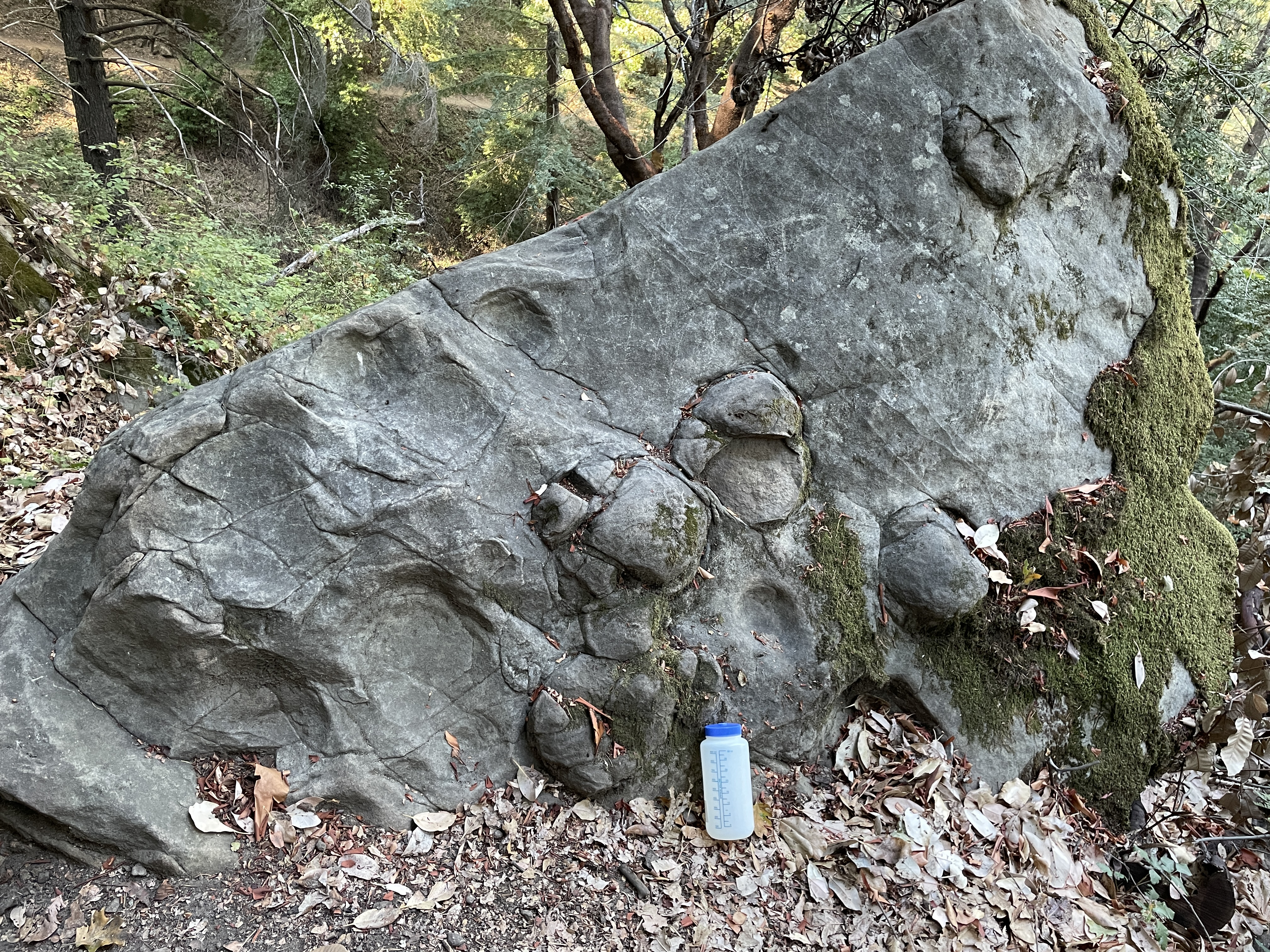
Vaqueros Formation sandstone with concretions

The type locality of the Vaqueros is from Vaqueros Canyon in the Santa Lucia Mountains, about eight miles southwest of Greenfield. The formation was first described by Homer Hamlin in 1904, as part of a report on the water resources of the Salinas Valley.

The sandstone unit consists of well-sorted grains, averaging medium-size, typically quartz and feldspar with some black flecks, and in form it ranges from cross-bedded to massive and thick-bedded. Occasionally it contains pebbles, especially near its base where it sits on the red non-marine Sespe Formation. Some fossils – including mollusks and barnacles – can be found in the Vaqueros, also near the base of the unit where the depositional environment was nearest shore.

The unit was deposited by runoff from highlands to the east into a shallow, warm marine environment, as the ocean transgressed on the subsiding floodplain containing the Sespe in the late Oligocene age, between 26 and 28 Ma (million years before present) to 24 to 25 Ma. As the land continued to subside, the ocean depth increased with a corresponding drop in grain size in higher strata. The topmost part of the Vaqueros contains interbedded mudstones, silstones, and fine-grained sandstones, representing this shift. The unit above the Vaqueros, the Rincon Formation, consists of deepwater shales.

The Vaqueros weathers to a clayey soil which supports chaparral, and on the southern slopes of the Santa Ynez Mountains in southern Santa Barbara County, its contact with the Rincon Formation is easily visible for it correlates closely to the line where the grassland or coastal sage scrub, nearer the coast, abruptly changes to dense chaparral on the mountainside.

== Paleontology ==
Fossils found in the Vaqueros are mostly near-shore marine organisms, such as mollusks, scallops, and oysters (Turritella sp., Pecten sp., Ostrea sp.) While the molluscan stage is hard to date and ranges from the Miocene epoch, strata from Simi Valley have sampled in the upper Oligocene period.

=== Mammals ===
Mammals reported from the Vaqueros Formation
Genus	Species	Stratigraphic position	Material	Notes	Images
Allodelphis	A. woodburnei	Lower		A river dolphin.	
"Cetotherium"	"C." furlongi	Upper unit (Early Miocene)		Type specimen missing. A Cetotheriid baleen whale	
Salishicetus	cf. S. sp.		A partial mandible and two teeth.	An aetiocetid baleen whale	

=== Molluscs ===
Molluscs reported from the Vaqueros Formation
Genus	Species	Member	Stratigraphic position	Notes	Images
Crepidula	C. diminutiva	Piru Creek area		A gastropod.	Crepidula neritoides
Turritella	T. sp.			A gastropod.	Turritella cingulifera
Anadara	A. hamelini	Piru Creek area		A bivalve.	Anadara granosa
Anadara	A. santaclarana	Piru Creek area		A bivalve.	Anadara granosa
Anadara	A. santana	Piru Creek area		A bivalve.	Anadara granosa
Anomia	A. vaquerosensis	Piru Creek area		A bivalve.	Anomia ephippium
Clementia	C. pertenius conradiana	Piru Creek area		A bivalve.	
Chione	cf. C. richthofeni	Piru Creek area		A bivalve.	Chione elevata
Eucrassatella	E. granti	Piru Creek area		A bivalve.	Eucrassatella donacina
Lucina	L. wattsi	Piru Creek area		A bivalve.	L. sp. from Italy
Macoma	M. arctata	Piru Creek area		A bivalve.	Macoma secta
Ostrea	O. sp.			A bivalve.	Ostrea edulis
Ostrea	O. howelli	Piru Creek area		A bivalve.	
Ostrea	O. eldridgei	Piru Creek area		A bivalve.	
Pecten	P. sp.	Piru Creek area		A bivalve.	Pecten maximus
Panopea	P. abrupta	Piru Creek area		A bivalve.	Panopea zelandica
Solen	S. gravidus baileyi	Piru Creek area			Gould's razor shell (Solen strictus))
Ceratostoma	C. sp.	Piru Creek area		A Sea Snail	Ceratostoma foliatum
Ocenebra	O. dorrancei	Piru Creek area		A Sea Snail	Ocenebra dorrancei
Olivella	O. pedroana subpedroana	Piru Creek area		A Sea Snail	
Potamides	P. sespeensis	Piru Creek area		A Sea Snail	Potamides migralis
Rapana	R. vaquerosensis	Piru Creek area		A Sea Snail	Rapana venosa
Sinum	S. scopulosum	Piru Creek area		A Sea Snail	Sinum cymba
Balanus	B. sp.	Piru Creek area		A barnacle.	Balanus nubilus

== As a petroleum-bearing unit ==
In some places, the Vaqueros has been deformed into anticlinal structures, or pinched out into structural traps, allowing petroleum to become trapped in economically recoverable quantities. Some locations where this has occurred include the Ellwood and Mesa Oil Fields in Santa Barbara County, and the Kettleman North Dome and Coalinga Oil Fields in the Central Valley. When grouped with the underlying Sespe Formation, because of its high porosity and the presence of an impermeable cap in the overlying Rincon Formation, it is the second-most important producing horizon in Southern California.
