= Sespe Formation =

Widespread fossiliferous sedimentary geologic unit in California

- Stratigraphic range: Late Eocene-Early Miocene
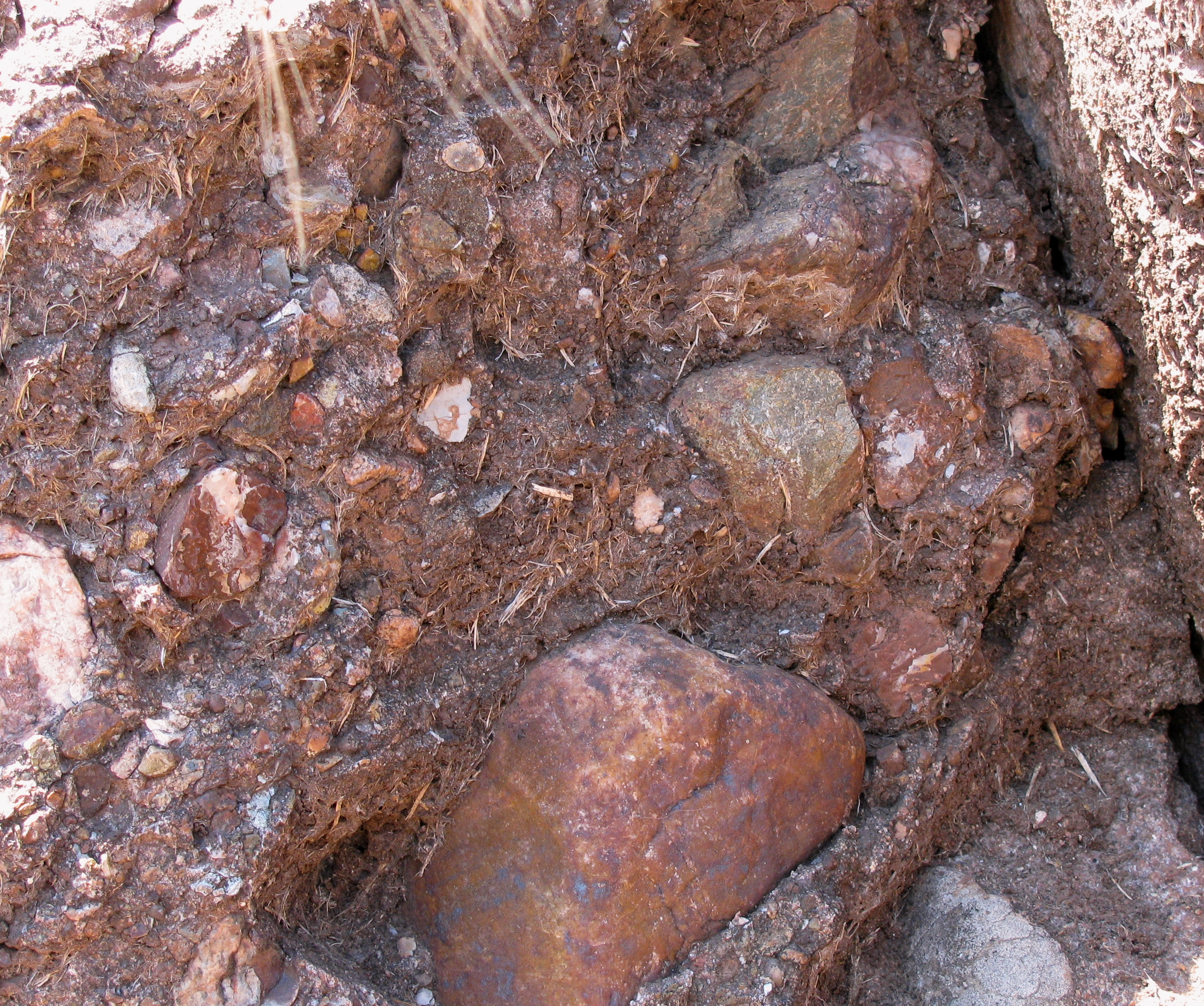
- Weathered, poorly sorted conglomerate from the lower member of the Sespe Formation, Santa Ynez Mountains, California. The clasts range in size from boulders to small pebbles.
- Type: sedimentary
- Underlies: Vaqueros Formation, Monterey Formation
- Overlies: Coldwater Formation ("Coldwater Sandstone", "Coldwater Shale")
- Thickness: 0–7,500 ft (0–2,286 m)

Lithology
- Primary: Sandstone, conglomerate
- Other: Mudstone, occasional shale

Location
- Region: Southern and south central California
- Country: United States

Type section
- Named for: Sespe Creek
- Named by: Watts (1897); redefined by Kew (1924)

The Sespe Formation is a widespread fossiliferous sedimentary geologic unit in southern and south central California in the United States. It is of nonmarine origin, consisting predominantly of sandstones and conglomerates laid down in a riverine, shoreline, and floodplain environment between the upper Eocene Epoch (around 40 million years ago) through the lower Miocene. It is often distinctive in appearance, with its sandstones weathering to reddish-brown, maroon, pinkish-gray, tan, and green. Since many of its sandstones are more resistant to erosion than many other regional sedimentary units it often forms dramatic outcrops and ridgelines in many local mountain ranges.

== Type locality ==
The type locality of the Sespe is along Sespe Creek in the Topatopa Mountains, about four miles (6 km) north of Fillmore, where it was first named in 1897 and redefined in 1924.

== Subdivision ==
The Sespe Formation has been divided into three clearly differentiable subunits, designed Lower, Middle, and Upper.

- The Lower Unit has a large proportion of conglomerate, as well as sandstone, and a smaller amount of mudstone and shale. Distinguishing this unit are the clasts within the conglomerate, which originated from a source terrane with granitic and volcanic rocks, probably in the vicinity of the modern-day Mojave Desert.
- The Middle Unit also contains conglomerates and sandstones, but the clasts within the conglomerates include chert and sandstones of the Franciscan complex.
- The Upper Unit of the Sespe Formation consists of interbedded sandstone, mudstone, and siltstones, without the conglomerates; the depositional environment at this time no longer included the pebbles and boulders which result in conglomerate beds.

== Depositional environment and paleontology ==
During the Oligocene Epoch, the granitic and volcanic mountain ranges in the present-day vicinity of San Diego County eroded over many millions of years, with their alluvium, ranging in size from microscopic particles to pebbles and even larger rocks, deposited in an extensive coastal floodplain intersected with rivers. The sedimentary rocks which resulted from the millions of years of deposition included mudstones, siltstones, and abundant sandstones and conglomerates. During this time the seashore gradually regressed to the west, as the large mountains eroded and filled the floodplain with alluvium. Over time the depositional environment changed from continental to marine, due to changes in surface elevation and sea level; the marine sedimentary formation equivalent to the Sespe is known as the Alegria Formation, and is more often found to the west, for example in southwestern Santa Barbara County. A peculiarity of the Sespe Formation is the presence of an unconformity throughout much of the geographic distribution of the unit, representing a gap of millions of years and including most or all of the early Oligocene; in the vicinity of Simi Valley, the gap corresponded to an erosional event lasting about 8 million years.

The redbeds found in the Sespe are similar to those characteristic of the Permian period, and the sudden occurrence of redbeds have been used – for example by Thomas Dibblee – to demarcate the beginning of the Sespe from the end of the Coldwater Sandstone in the stratigraphic column.

In the Oligocene the land subsided, creating a shallow, warm marine environment. Sediments continued to accrete, but now they were mixed with the shells of near-shore creatures, similar to those in modern shallow tropical seas. The geologic unit which resulted from deposition in this environment, and which follows the Sespe in lithologic sequence, is named the Vaqueros Formation.

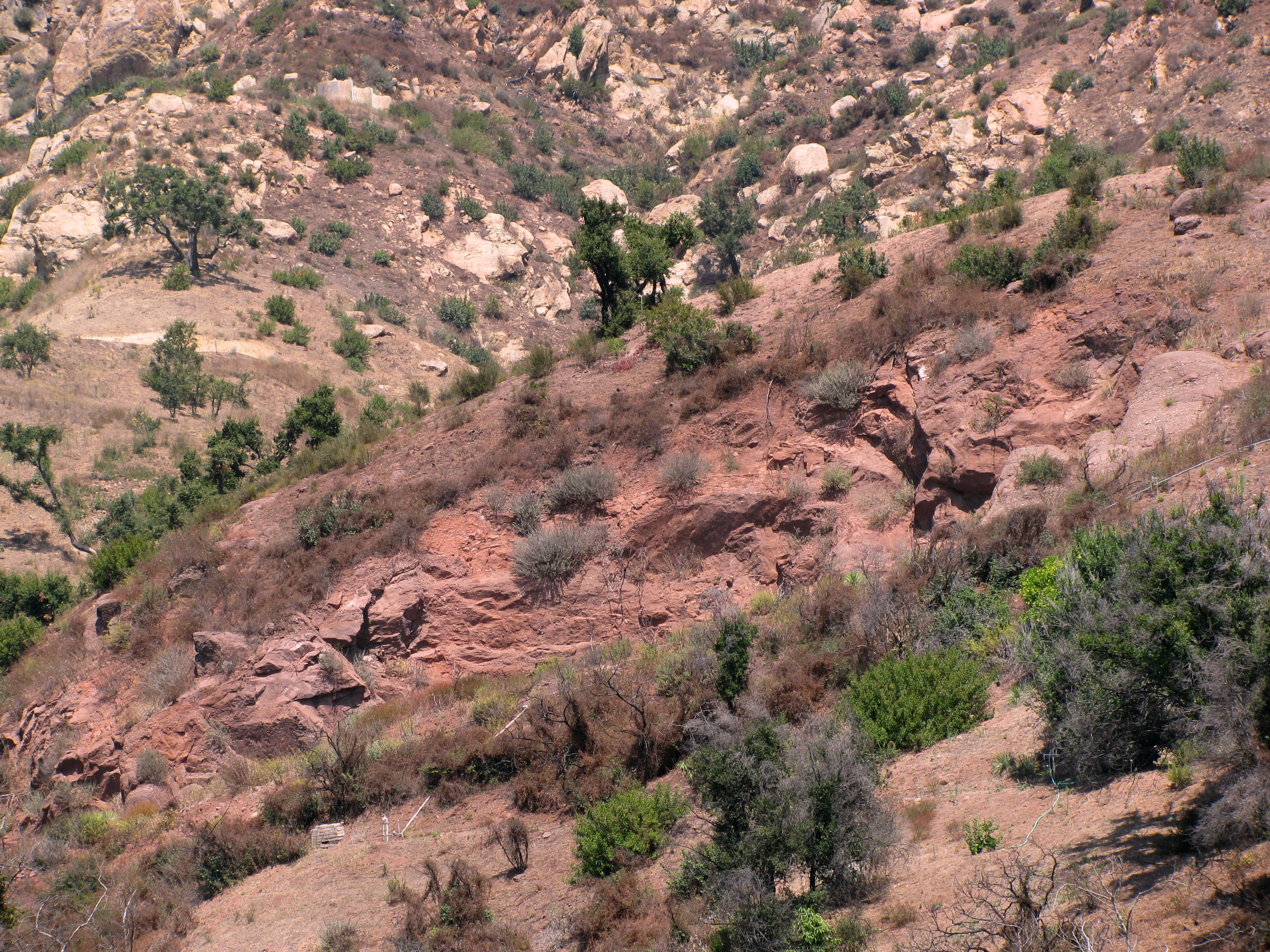
Typical outcrop of the Sespe Formation, north of Santa Barbara, California. The red rocks in the center are Sespe; lighter-colored rocks on the mountainside in the background are the Coldwater Formation.

Numerous vertebrate fossils have been found in the Sespe, with the principal locations of the finds north of Simi Valley in Ventura County. A few of the many species associated with the Sespe include Amynodontopsis (an Eocene rhinoceros), Simimys, a rodent, and Sespedectes singularis.

== Economic importance ==
In some places, certain high-porosity sandstones within the Sespe unit have been deformed into anticlinal structures, and contain considerable amounts of petroleum and has produced 400 million barrels (64,000,000 m^{3}) of oil in Ventura County, California. For example, both the South Mountain and West Montalvo Oil Fields have producing horizons within the Sespe, and as such the unit is of economic importance. Within Southern California, the combined Sespe-Vaqueros coarse-grained clastic rocks form the second-most important petroleum-bearing unit, second only to the Pliocene-age Pico and Repetto Formations, which are usually much nearer the surface. The overlying Rincon Formation, a shale deposited in a deep-sea environment, serves as an impermeable cap.

The Sespe Formation contains Uranium deposits of potential economic value.

Sandstone from the Sespe also is used as a building material, and colorful boulders of its sandstones are sometimes used for landscaping.

== See also ==
- Vaqueros Formation
- Monterey Formation
- Coldwater Formation
- Rincon Formation
