= Rincon Formation =

Sedimentary geologic unit in Santa Barbara County, California

- Stratigraphic range: Miocene
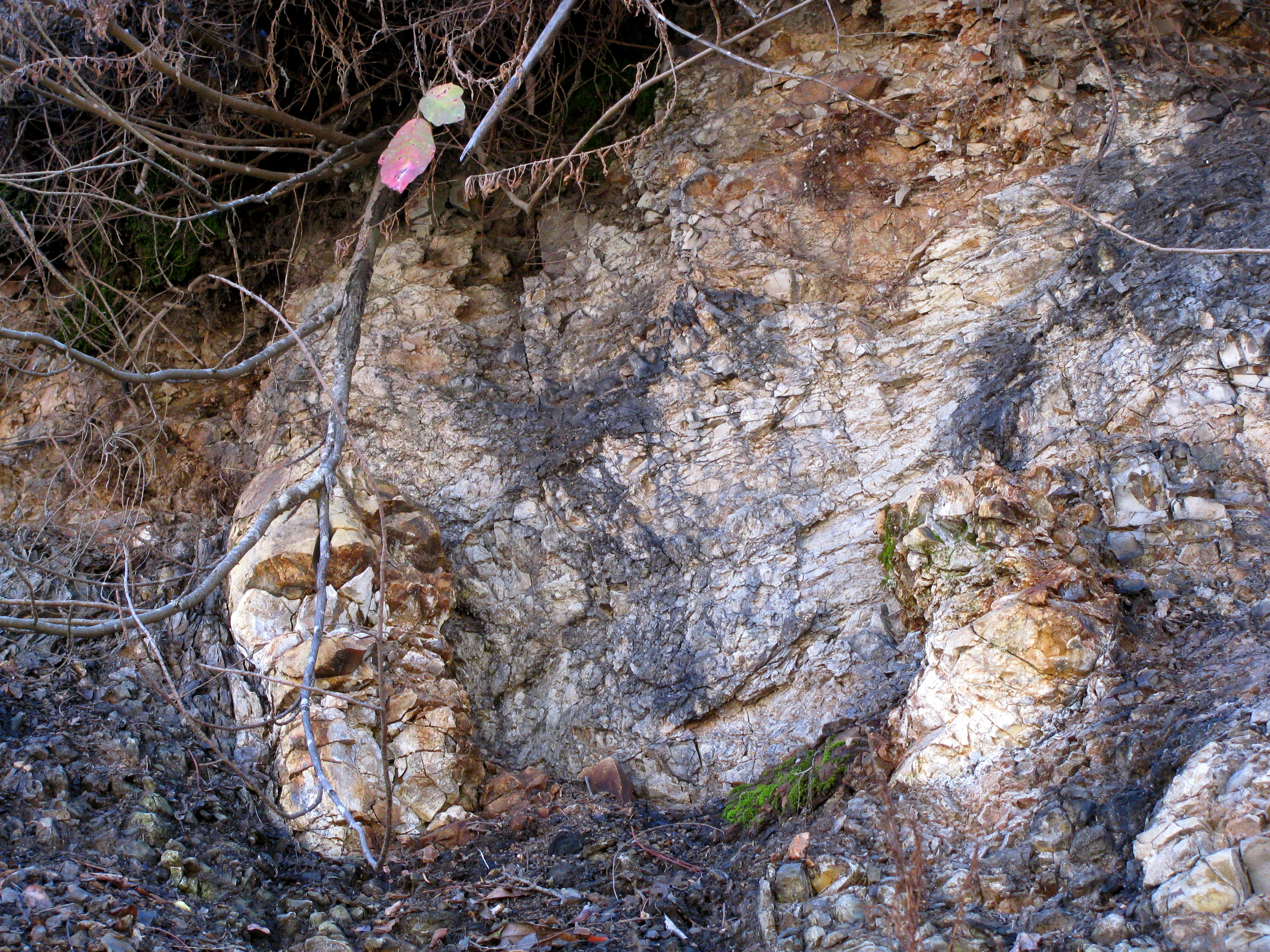
- Weathered outcrop of the Rincon Formation, Sycamore Canyon, Santa Barbara, California.
- Type: sedimentary
- Underlies: Monterey Formation
- Overlies: Vaqueros Formation
- Thickness: 500 to 1700 feet

Lithology
- Primary: shale
- Other: siltstone, mudstone, with minor sandstone beds

Location
- Region: Coastal southern California
- Country: United States

Type section
- Named for: Rincon Mountain (east slope, Los Sauces Canyon), Ventura County
- Named by: Kerr, 1936

The Rincon Formation (or Rincon Shale) is a sedimentary geologic unit of Lower Miocene age, abundant in the coastal portions of southern Santa Barbara County, California eastward into Ventura County. Consisting of massive to poorly bedded shale, mudstone, and siltstone, it weathers readily to a rounded hilly topography with clayey, loamy soils in which landslides and slumps are frequent. It is recognizable on the south slopes of the Santa Ynez Mountains as the band at the base of the mountains which supports grasses rather than chaparral. Outcrops of the unit are infrequent, with the best exposures on the coastal bluffs near Naples, in the San Marcos Foothills, at the Tajiguas Landfill, and in road cuts. The geologic unit is notorious as a source of radon gas related to its high uranium content, released by radioactive decay.

== Type locality and extent ==
The type locality of the unit is in Ventura County, on the east side of Rincon Mountain, where the formation is exposed in the south-flowing Los Sauces Canyon, north of U.S. Highway 101 and in the vicinity of the Rincon Oil Field. The unit is mapped from Ventura County westward along the south slope of the Santa Ynez Mountains, as well as on portions of the north slope. It also occurs in a few places north of the Santa Ynez Fault, but outcrops nowhere north of the Santa Ynez River. In the subsurface it frequently is found in well cores, underlying the Monterey Formation and overlying the Vaqueros Formation. At the ground surface, the contact with the Vaqueros is obvious along the south slope of the mountains, for it is almost always defined by the line dividing the rounded, grassy foothills from the more rugged, chaparral-covered sandstones upslope.

Thickness of the unit at the surface ranges from about 1,400 to 1,700 feet (430 to 520 m) south of the mountain crest, averaging 1600 feet. It is less thick north of the mountains, attaining a maximum thickness of around 1,000 feet (300 m) at the western end of its range, and thinning to the east. In the subsurface under the Santa Barbara Channel the thickness is variable but generally less than onshore. In well cores in the Hondo Offshore Oil Field the thickness is around 600 feet (180 m), while in the abandoned Coal Oil Point field it is 900 feet (270 m), and in the Cuarta Offshore Oil Field it is over 1,200 feet (370 m) thick.

== Lithology and deposition environment ==
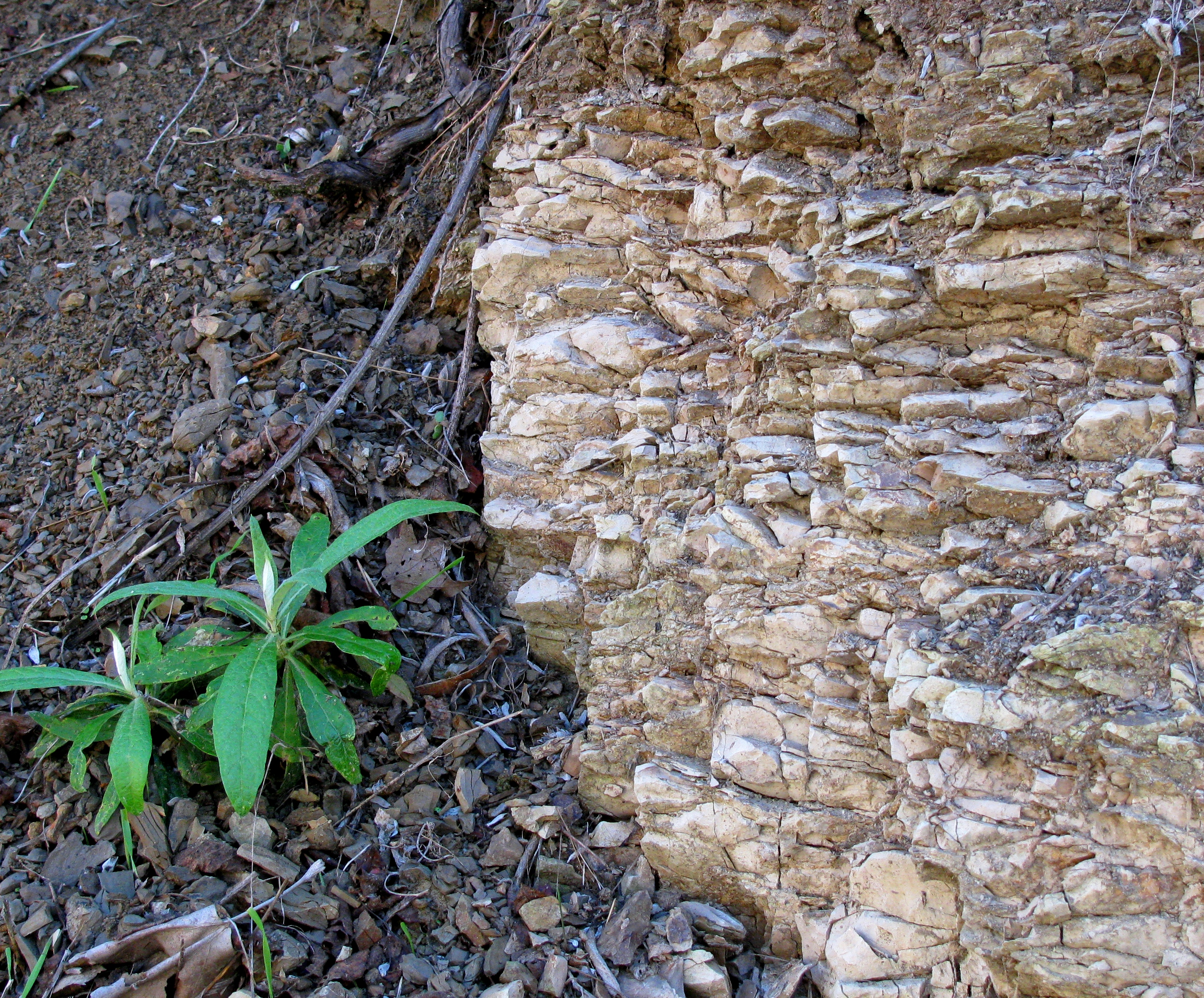
Close-up of the Rincon Shale in a road cut, showing weathered, highly fractured surface.

The Rincon Formation is massive to poorly bedded, and consists of predominantly argillaceous to silty shale and mudstone, with occasional dolomite. Two layers of siliceous shale are found in the middle of the unit, and they outcrop noticeably in the region west of Goleta. The base of the unit, which rests conformably on the shallower-water Vaqueros Formation, contains a glauconitic layer. Several thin layers of bentonite occur within the unit, and the unit is capped by one as well, which forms the base of the conformably overlying Monterey Formation. North of the Santa Ynez River, the Rincon is typically capped not by the Monterey but by the Temblor Formation, a sandstone similar to the underlying Vaqueros; additionally, north of the river the Rincon Formation grades into this sandstone to the east. Northeast of Blue Canyon and the Little Pine Fault, in the backcountry of easternmost Santa Barbara County and Ventura County, the Rincon Formation disappears, and the Temblor Formation rests unconformably on the much older Cozy Dell Shale.

The Rincon Shale was deposited on the deep sea floor during the time at which the Miocene sea reached its greatest depth. The faunal assemblage found as fossils and fragmentary fossils indicates that the sea was tropical to subtropical at this time. During this period the sea deepened due to tectonic forces, as the area of deposition was at the collision boundary of the North American and Pacific Plates, shortly after the Farallon Plate had been completely buried beneath the American plate.

At that time only clay- and mud-sized grains could reach the deposition location, since it was far from the shore, and sediment accumulated slowly. The unit represents a period of around 7.5 million years – from 24 Ma (million years before present) to 17.5 – covering, with the Vaqueros Formation, the entirety of the lower Miocene.

The Rincon Formation weathers to a distinctive loamy, black soil with a high expansion-contraction potential, presenting a risk to structures built on soils derived from the formation. Landslides and slumps are frequent on soils produced from the Rincon, although they usually are not large, limited to about 15 feet (4.6 m) in depth.

As is common with shale units, the formation has a low permeability, and therefore where oil and gas reservoirs occur in the area it serves as the impermeable cap keeping the hydrocarbons in place. Some of these reservoirs include the Ellwood Oil Field, Gaviota Offshore Gas Field, Cuarta Offshore Oil Field, Molino Gas Field, and others.

== Paleontology ==
Microfossils are common in the Rincon, and have been helpful in dating the unit. Foraminiferal remains in particular are abundant, and the various types have allowed staging of the layers into Upper Zemorrian and Lower and Upper Saucesian. Within Santa Barbara County, two significant fossil finds (aside from microfossils) have been made in the Rincon Formation. In Ventura County, the exposure of the formation along Los Sauces Creek has yielded ten different species of ostracoda; a detailed study suggested that the sea bottom they inhabited was around 6,600 feet (2,000 m) deep, very near to the edge of the continental shelf.

== Radon ==
Naturally high in uranium, the Rincon Formation is a notorious source of radon gas emissions in Santa Barbara and Ventura Counties, making them the counties with the greatest radon hazard in California. Radon is a byproduct of radioactive decay of uranium, which is present in the Rincon at around 20 to 30 parts per million (ppm). A 1993 study found that approximately 74% of homes built on the Rincon Formation, or on alluvium or soils derived from the Rincon Formation, showed interior radon concentrations in excess of 4 picocuries per liter (pCi/L), the U.S. EPA action level, and 26% had measured levels of radon over 20 pCi/L. According to the U.S. EPA, non-smokers exposed to radon at the 20 pCi/L level over a lifetime had a risk of dying from lung cancer at 36 in 1000, as opposed to 7 in 1000 at the 4 pCi/L level, and 2 per 1000 at the average indoor radon level in the United States of 1.3 pCi/L. Smokers were at a much greater risk, with fully 260 out of 1,000 expected to die of lung cancer with a lifetime exposure of 20 pCi/L of radon.

Radon migrates upwards from its source, entering buildings wherever the bottom is imperfectly sealed, for example through cracks in a concrete slab. If a structure is poorly ventilated – such as when the windows remain shut during the cool season – radon can accumulate to a hazardous level. Some of the mitigation measures employed in houses on the Rincon Formation since the discovery of the problem in the 1990s include building ventilation systems for the air space beneath the structure, performing "soil suction" in which the gas is pulled directly from the soil under the building, and active house pressurization, which keeps the gas from entering.
