= Carpinteria Offshore Oil Field =

Oil and gas field in southern California

Coordinates: 34.3416°N 119.5248°W

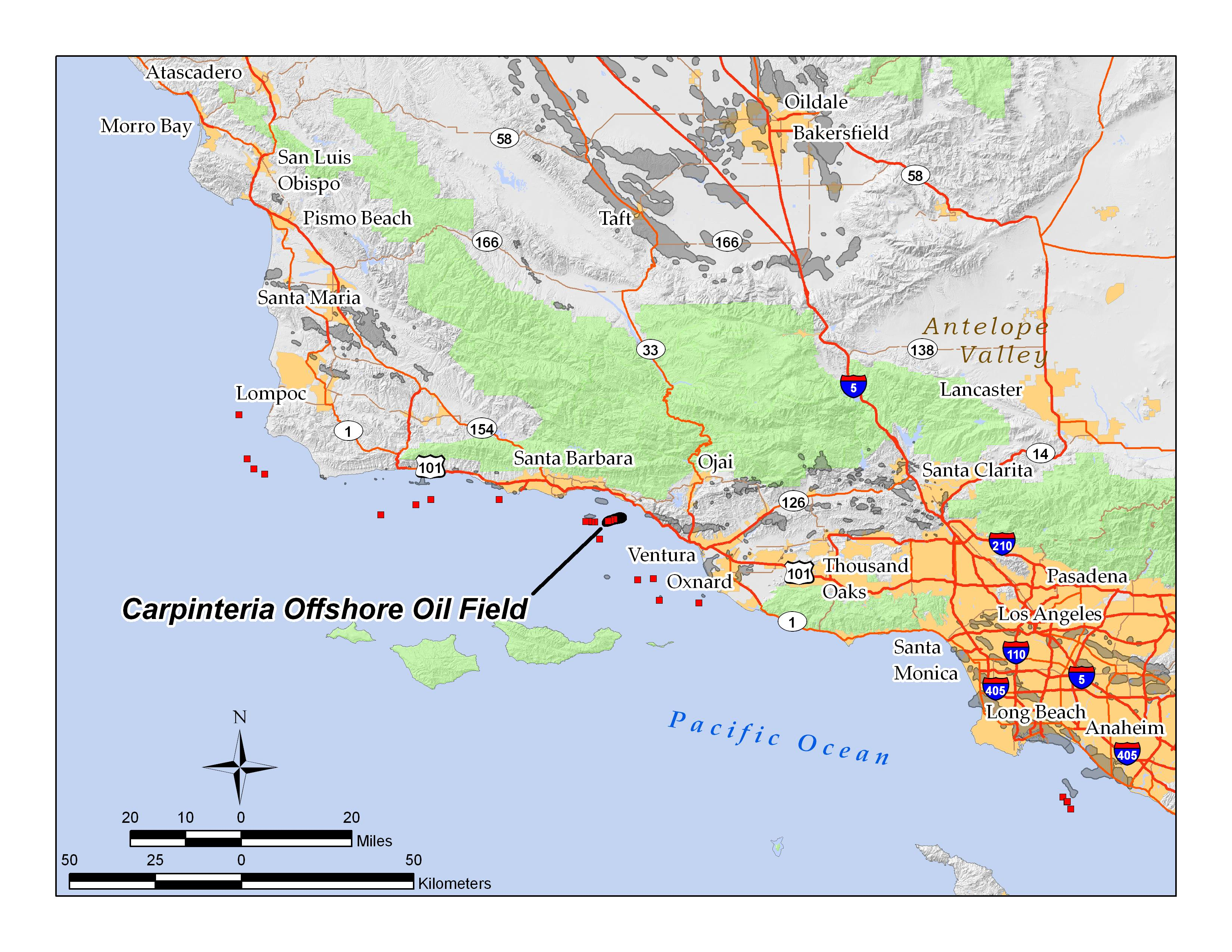
- The Carpinteria Offshore Oil Field in the waters off southern California. Other oil fields are shown in dark gray. Small red squares mark the locations of drilling platforms.
- Country: United States
- Region: Southern California
- Location: Santa Barbara County, both in State and Federal waters
- Offshore/onshore: offshore
- Operators: Pacific Operators Offshore LLC (PACOPS), Dos Cuadras Offshore Resources (DCOR)

Field history
- Discovery: 1964
- Start of development: 1965
- Start of production: 1965
- Peak year: 1969

Production
- Current production of oil: 1,345 barrels per day (~67,020 t/a)
- Year of current production of oil: 2008
- Producing formations: Pico (lower Pliocene)

The Carpinteria Offshore Oil Field is an oil and gas field in Santa Barbara Channel, south of the city of Carpinteria in southern California in the United States. Discovered in 1964, and reaching peak production in 1969, it has produced over 106 million barrels of oil in its lifetime, and retains approximately 2 million barrels in reserve recoverable with present technology, according to the California State Department of Natural Resources. Currently the field is produced from three drilling platforms four to five miles (8 km) offshore, within Federal waters outside of the tidelands zone. Two of the platforms are operated by Pacific Operators Offshore LLC (PACOPS), the operating arm of Carpinteria-based Carone Petroleum; the other platform is operated by Dos Cuadras Offshore Resources (DCOR). The Carpinteria field is the 50th largest field in California by total original oil in place, as of the end of 2008.

The Carpinteria field is one of the only fields offshore California to straddle the line between state and federal waters. The portion of the field in state waters was abandoned in 1996 with the dismantling of the two platforms operated by Chevron.

== Setting ==
The oil field is one of many discovered in the 1960s and 1970s underneath the ocean bottom offshore of Southern California. Most of the field is in relatively shallow water, with the water depths ranging from about 120 to 200 feet (61 m). It is about three miles (5 km) long by one half mile across, extending from west-southwest to east-northeast, and has a total productive surface area of approximately 340 acres (1.4 km^{2}).

The field is divided into five leases, with three in the state tidelands zone, and two in the federal Outer Continental Shelf (OCS) zone. The three drilling and production platforms remaining of the original five are in the western part of the field, arranged in a line running from west to east, with Henry on the west, followed by Platform Houchin and Platform Hogan, with Hogan nearest to the state tidelands boundary and the shore. Oil and gas from Platform Henry moves via undersea pipeline to DCOR's Rincon Plant processing facility, and oil and gas from Houchin and Hogan runs to PACOPS's La Conchita Plant, about two miles (3 km) northwest of the Rincon Facility, near the town of La Conchita.

The three platforms are in 154 to 173 feet (53 m) of water, and range from 3.7 to 4.3 miles (6.9 km) from land.

== Geology ==
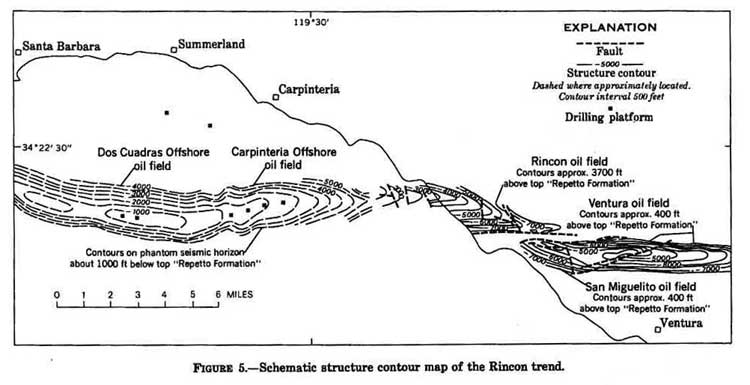
Map showing relation of the Carpinteria field to the Rincon anticlinal trend and the adjacent Dos Cuadras field.

Along with the Dos Cuadras field to the west, the Carpinteria offshore field is part of a larger anticlinal trend beginning on land north of Ventura with the Ventura Oil Field, and continuing with breaks west through the San Miguelito and Rincon oil fields, then running offshore to the Carpinteria and Dos Cuadras fields underneath the Santa Barbara Channel.

Producing units are primarily in the Lower Pliocene Pico Sands. Rather than being one continuous oil reservoir, the oil is trapped in a series of narrow stratigraphic traps, with the more porous, oil-bearing sections of the sandstone interbedded with impermeable units, rather like a long layer cake slightly warped up along its long axis. Oil has pooled at the top of the anticlinal fold for each unit. A fault underneath this large interbedded sand unit has allowed the formation of yet another producing formation, called the Subthrust Pico; in this unit oil has pooled up against the fault, which has positioned impermeable units on top of porous, oil-bearing sand strata turned on their side. Average depth to the Pico Sands unit is about 3,800 feet (1,200 m), and depth to the Subthrust Pico is around 6,000 feet (1,800 m). Overall, 29 separate productive units have been isolated within the field, as of a 1997 reservoir modeling exercise carried out by Los Alamos National Laboratory and Pacific Operators Offshore.

Oil from the field is medium-grade, with an API gravity from 26 to 27.

== History, operations, and production ==
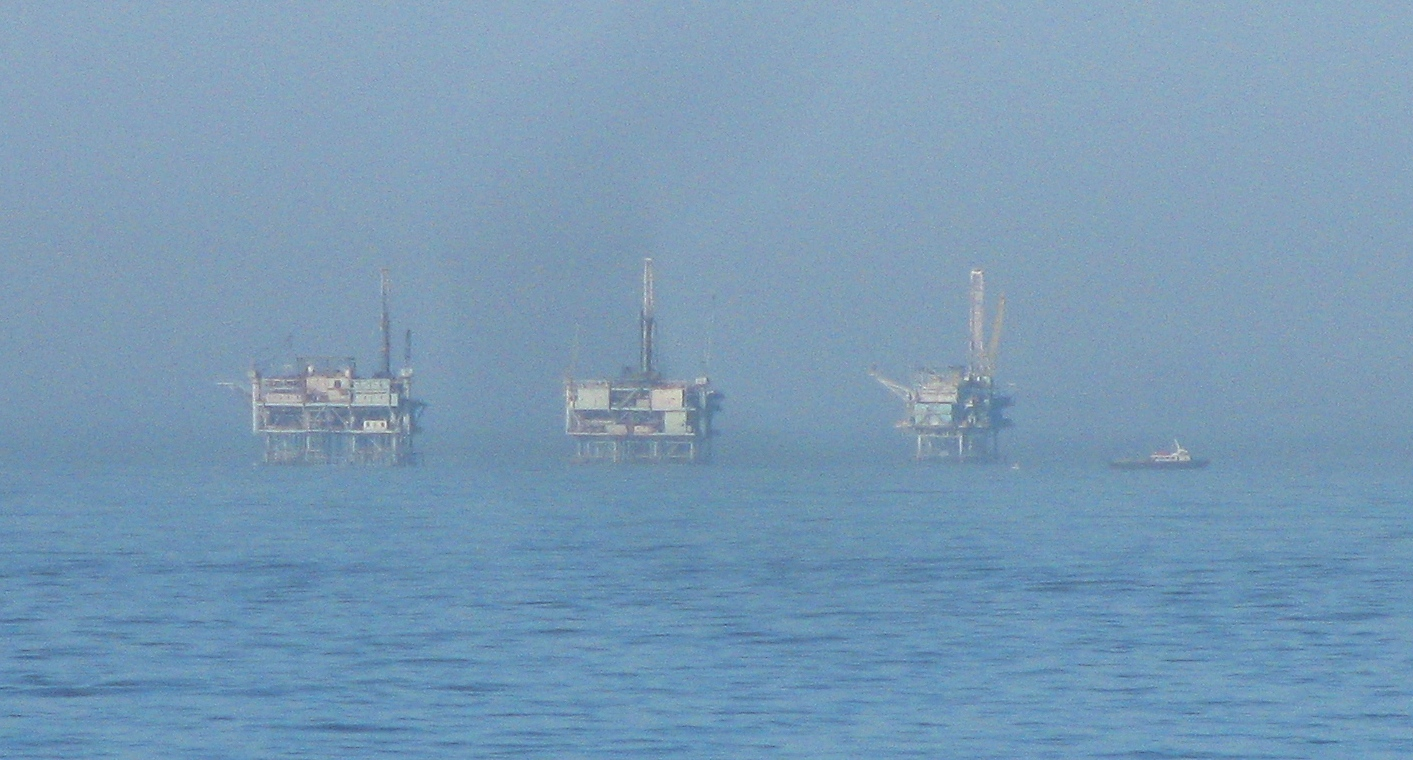
The three platforms of the Carpinteria field, as seen from the shore north of La Conchita. From left to right they are Platforms Hogan, Houchin, and Henry.

The Carpinteria offshore field was discovered in 1964 by geologists from Chevron and ARCO following the Rincon anticlinal trend, which implied the existence of oil reserves offshore. Production had already peaked at many onshore fields, and technology for drilling and producing offshore was just becoming available. The first part of the field to be found was within the state tidelands zone, and Standard Oil Company installed platforms Hope and Heidi in 1965 to produce from the field out to the tidelands limit. Federal lease OCS-P 0166 – the first federal lease in the Santa Barbara Channel – was awarded to Phillips Petroleum on December 15, 1966, and they installed platforms Hogan and Houchin on September 1, 1967, and June 10, 1968, respectively, to produce from the federal portion of the field.

Signal Petroleum, a subsidiary of the current owner (Carone Petroleum), took over operation of platforms Houchin and Hogan in 1990, becoming the first independent oil and gas operator offshore on the west coast; at this time, the other offshore platforms were still operated by the majors (primarily Union, Exxon, Texaco, Chevron, and Phillips). In addition to the platforms, the company acquired the oil and gas processing plant at La Conchita, on the mountain side of the U.S. Highway 101 freeway where it runs along the sea.

Platform Henry, in federal lease OCS-P 0240, has a more convoluted history. The federal government awarded the lease to Sunray DX on April 1, 1968, but their successor (Sun Oil Co.) did not install Platform Henry until August 31, 1979. The platform passed over to Unocal in 1990, and then to Torch Energy in 1996. Torch sold to Nuevo Energy in 1997, and when Plains Exploration & Production acquired Nuevo in 2004 the platform became one of several operated by Plains. Plains sold their operations on the field to DCOR on March 22, 2005.

Chevron Corp., the successor to Standard Oil, ran the two platforms in the State leases, ceasing operations in 1992 due to the decline in oil prices and in reservoir productivity. They shut in the wells, and then formally abandoned them and removed both platforms in 1996. Believing that the state portion of the field could be made economical again, and that reserves were not completely depleted, in June 2001 Carone Petroleum proposed to reopen that part of the field by directionally drilling from platform Hogan, which is in federal waters. As of 2010 that has not occurred.

At the end of 2008, there were 44 producing wells remaining on the Carpinteria offshore field distributed between the three platforms, and they reported a water cut of 82%, indicating a mature field in decline (of all the fluid pumped from the field, 82% was water).

== See also ==
- Offshore oil and gas in California
