= Dos Cuadras Offshore Oil Field =

Oil and gas field in California

Coordinates: 34.3466°N 119.6184°W

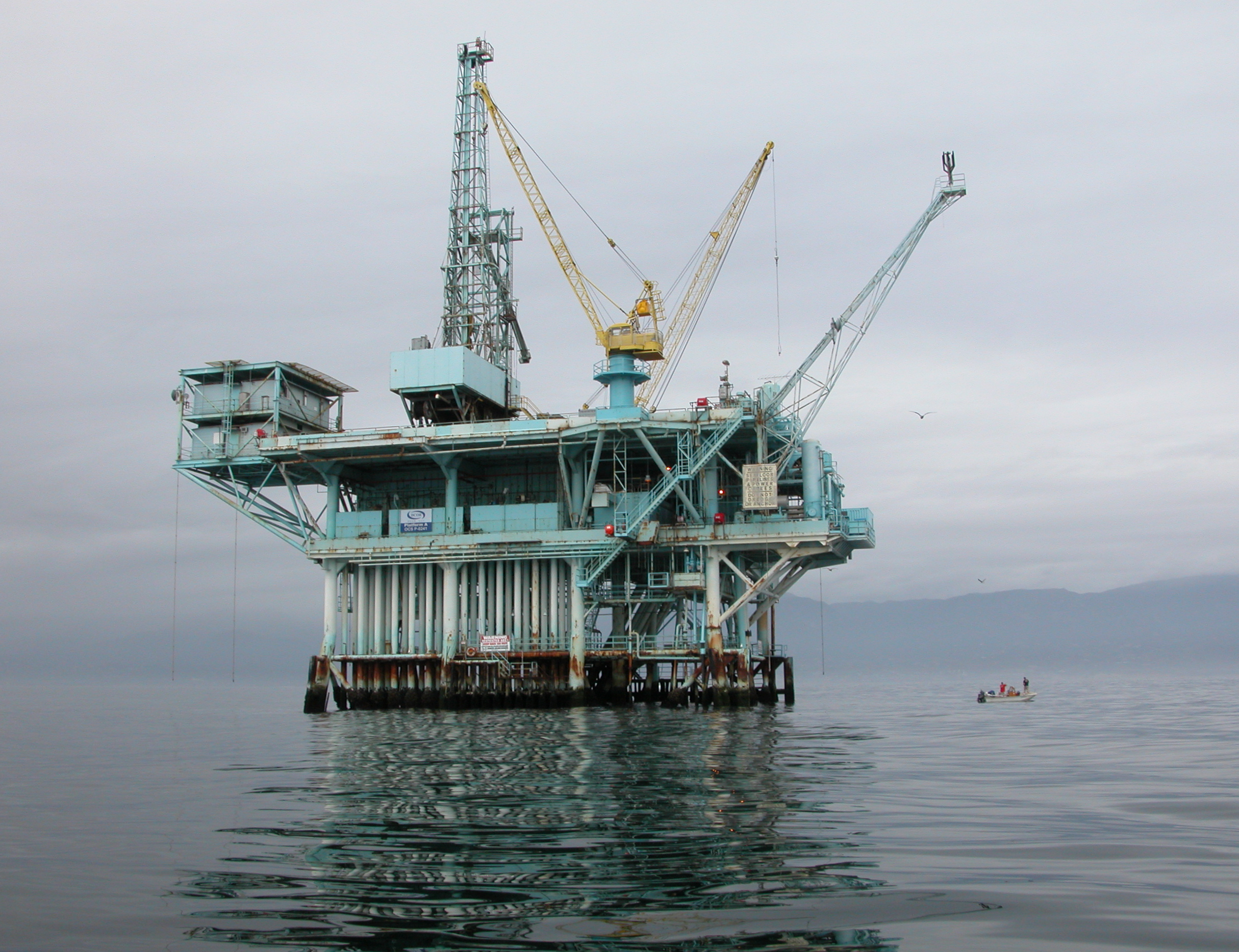
Platform A, Dos Cuadras Oilfield, 2006 photo. The 1969 Santa Barbara Oil Spill originated from this platform.

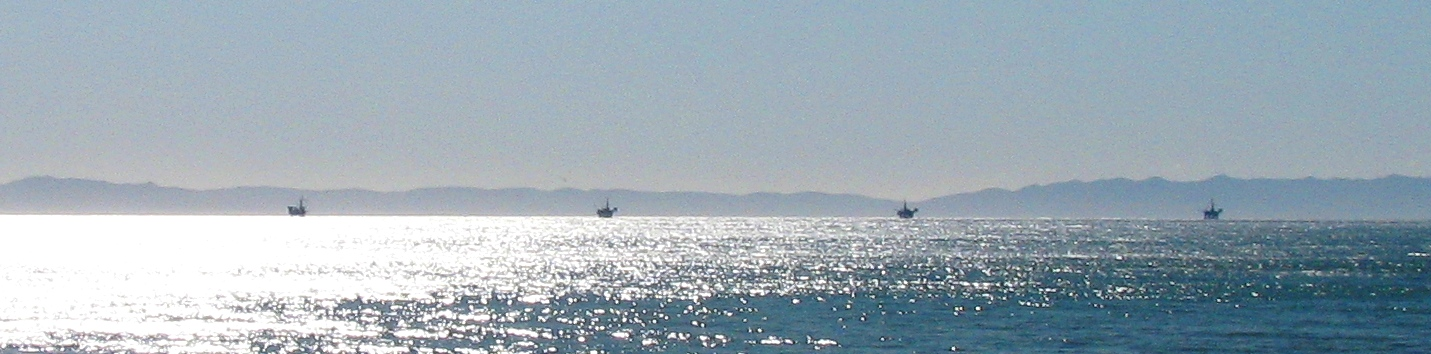
The four platforms producing from the Dos Cuadras Field, as seen from Summerland, California. They are, in order from left to right: Platforms Hillhouse, "A", "B", and "C". Santa Cruz Island in background.

The Dos Cuadras Offshore Oil Field is a large oil and gas field underneath the Santa Barbara Channel about eight miles southeast of Santa Barbara, California. Discovered in 1968, and with a cumulative production of over 260 million barrels of oil, it is the 24th-largest oil field within California and the adjacent waters. As it is in the Pacific Ocean outside of the 3-mile tidelands limit, it is a federally leased field, regulated by the U.S. Department of the Interior rather than the California Department of Conservation. It is entirely produced from four drilling and production platforms in the channel, which as of 2009 were operated by Dos Cuadras Offshore Resources (DCOR), LLC, a private firm based in Ventura. A blowout near one of these platforms – Unocal's Platform A – was responsible for the 1969 Santa Barbara oil spill that was formative for the modern environmental movement, and spurred the passage of the National Environmental Policy Act.

== Setting ==
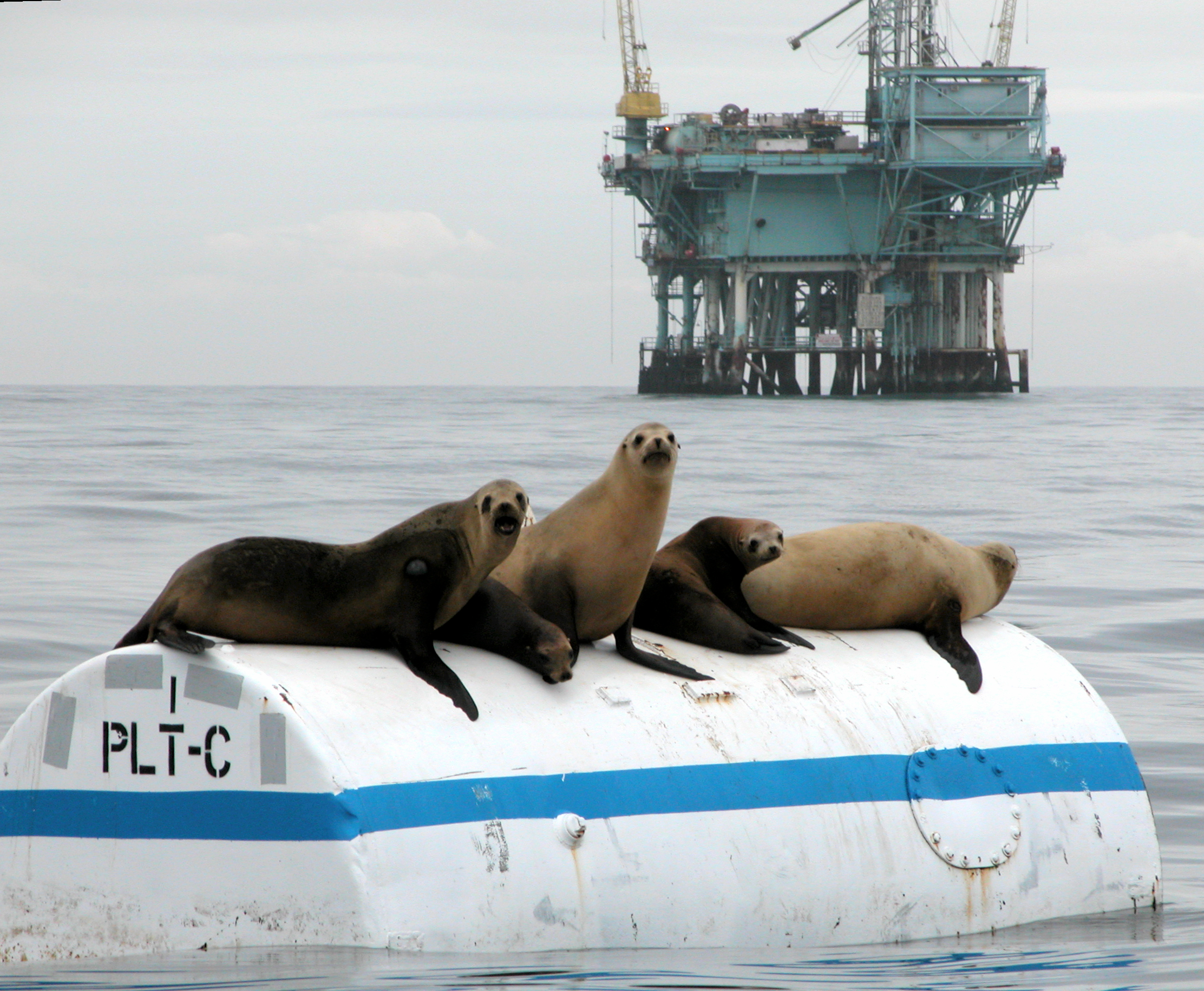
Sea lions on a float at Platform C, Dos Cuadras oilfield

The Dos Cuadras field is one of many underneath the ocean bottom offshore of Southern California, most of which were discovered in the 1960s and 1970s. All of the field is outside of the 3-mile geographic limit, making it subject to U.S. government rather than California regulation. The four platforms are arranged in a line running from east to west, spaced one-half mile apart, with Platform Hillhouse on the east, and Platforms "A", "B", and "C" in order to the west.

A pair of undersea pipelines, one for oil and one for gas, connect the four platforms to the shore near La Conchita. Oil and gas produced on the Dos Cuadras field are pumped about 12 miles east to the Rincon Oil & Gas Processing Plant on a hilltop adjacent to the Rincon Oil Field, about a mile southeast of La Conchita. From there oil travels down to Ventura along the M-143 pipeline to the Ventura pump station, and then to Los Angeles area refineries by way of a TOSCO pipeline in the Santa Clara River Valley.

The ocean bottom is relatively flat in the vicinity of the field, and all platforms are in a water depth of approximately 190 feet.

== Geology ==
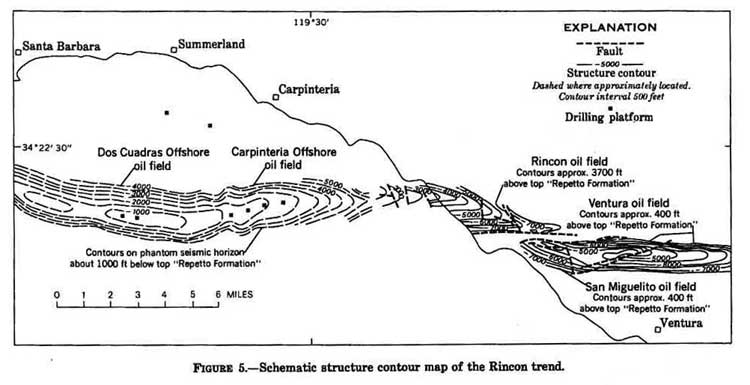
Map showing relation of the Dos Cuadras Field to the Rincon anticlinal trend.

The Dos Cuadras field is a faulted anticlinal structure which plunges at both ends, thereby forming an ideal trap for hydrocarbon accumulation. It is part of the larger Rincon Anticlinal Trend, which includes the Carpinteria Offshore Oil Field to the east, as well as the Rincon, San Miguelito, and Ventura fields onshore. Oil is found in two formations, the Pliocene-age Pico Formation and the underlying Miocene Santa Margarita Formation. By far the most productive unit is the Repetto Sands portion of the Pico Formation. Only one well has produced from the Santa Margarita; all the others are in the Repetto Sands.

The Repetto Sands unit consists of layers of mudstone, siltstone, and shale, and due to its depositional environment the general grain size and porosity increase towards the east. It is the same formation which is richly productive in the oil fields of the Los Angeles Basin, such as the Salt Lake and Beverly Hills fields, where it is also folded into anticlinal traps. In the Dos Cuadras field, the oil-bearing strata are at depths ranging from 500 to 4,200 feet below the sea floor, and individual strata are separated by impermeable layers of shaly material.

Oil from the field averages API gravity of 25, with a range from 18 to 34, which classifies as medium-grade crude. Reservoir pressure began at 750 psi, sufficient for easy pumping in the early years of field development.

== History and production ==
Oil has been known in the Santa Barbara Channel since prehistoric times; the native Chumash people used tar from the numerous natural seeps as a sealant, and tar regularly washes up on the beaches from the offshore seeps. The world's first offshore oil drilling took place at the Summerland Oil Field in 1896, only five miles north of the Dos Cuadras field. Those wells were put in from piers in shallow water. Technology for drilling in deeper water from platforms did not come about until the middle of the 20th century.

While the existence of the field was suspected in the 1950s, the field was not discovered until 1968. Unocal and several other oil companies took out leases on the field in February 1968, and put in the first well, and the first platform, that same year. Data regarding the four platforms are as follows:

Name	Installed	First production	Water depth
Platform A	September 14, 1968	March 3, 1969	188 feet
Platform B	November 8, 1968	July 19, 1969	190 feet
Platform Hillhouse	November 26, 1969	July 21, 1970	190 feet
Platform C	February 28, 1977	August 1, 1977	192 feet

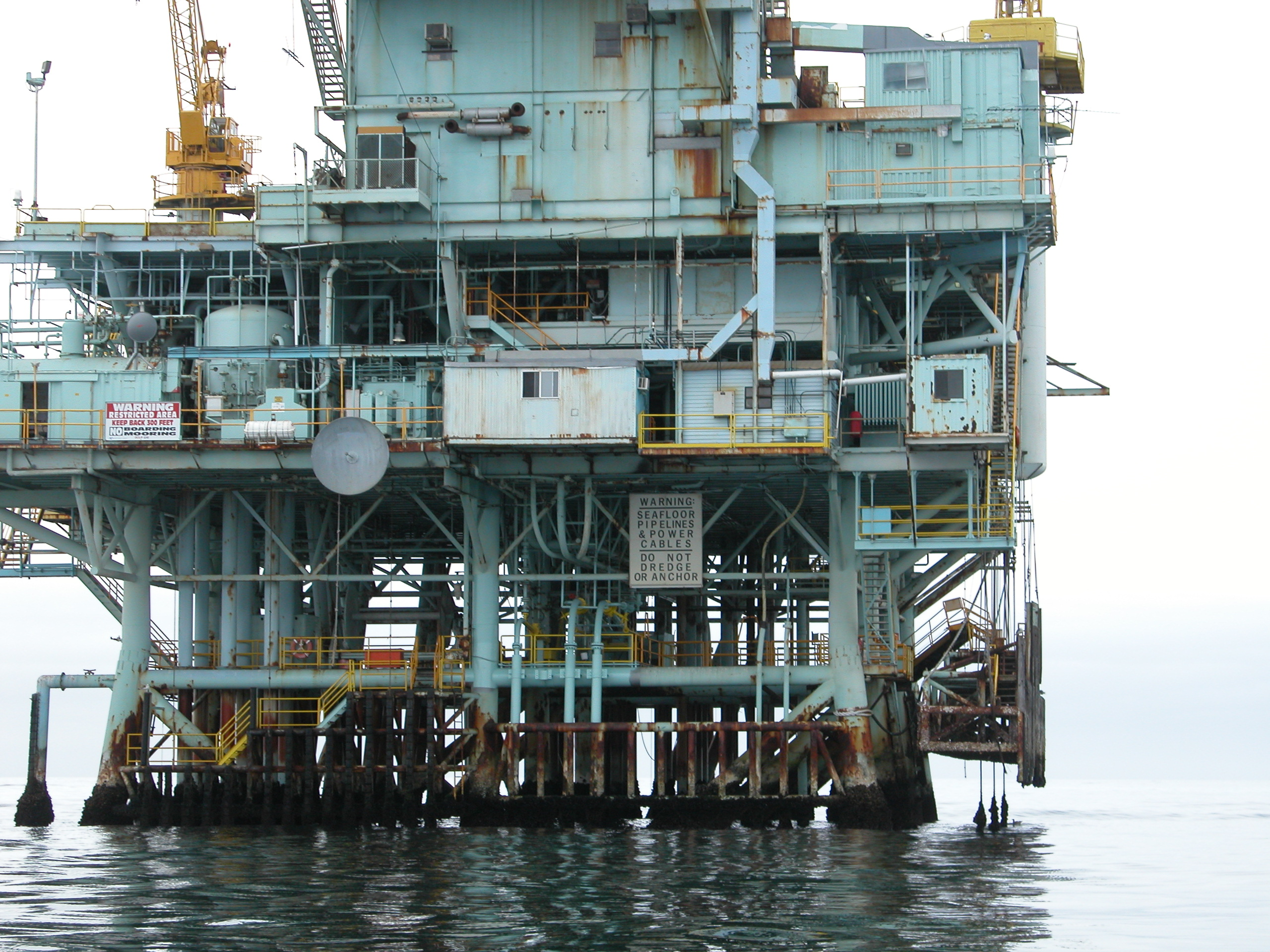
"Hillhouse" platform, Dos Cuadras. 2006 photo by Doc Searls.

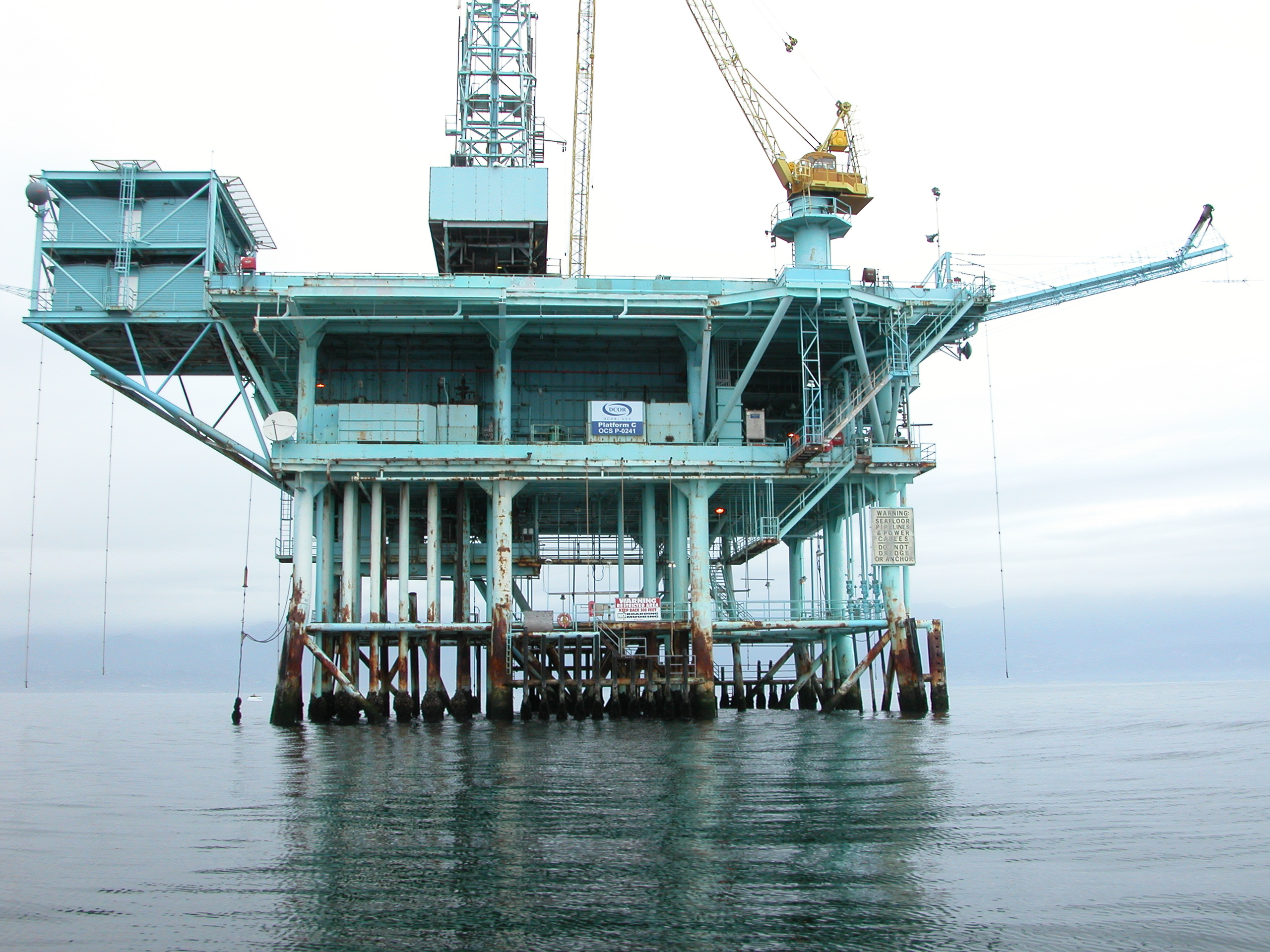
Platform C, Dos Cuadras, 2006

Unocal succeeded in installing the first four wells from its Platform A by January 1969, but their attempt to install the fifth well was catastrophic, and resulted in one of the most notorious environmental disasters in United States history. Because the drillers were using an insufficient length of protective casing, when the well hit a high-pressure zone in the field, it blew out, spewing enormous quantities of oil and gas into the water from the sea floor. While crews were able to cap the wellhead and relieve the pressure there, the adjacent geologic formations were not strong enough to contain the pressure, and lacking a steel protective casing, the reservoir fluid and gas ripped through the sedimentary sand layers directly on the ocean floor; the result was the 1969 Santa Barbara oil spill of 80,000 to 100,000 barrels, which eventually coated over 40 miles of southern California coastline with oil, an ecological disaster which killed upward of 10,000 birds and numerous sea mammals and other creatures.

Following the spill, the Secretary of the Interior ended all offshore oil drilling in the Outer Continental Shelf (OCS) until measures for better oversight were put in place, which happened in 1970 with the passage of the federal National Environmental Policy Act (NEPA), and in California, with the California Environmental Quality Act (CEQA). Opposition to oil drilling was nothing new in Santa Barbara – local residents, led by a newspaper publisher, objected enough to the expansion of the Summerland field in the 1890s to organize a late-night derrick-destroying party near the present-day Miramar Hotel – but the spill intensified the local hostility to oil drilling to the point that few new platforms were installed, and none at all within the 3-mile limit.

After the disaster and cleanup, Unocal continued drilling wells from the two platforms that were already in place ("A" and "B", began producing from them in March 1969, and installed two more platforms ("C" and "Hillhouse"). Production from the field peaked quickly, reaching a maximum in 1971, during which year almost 28 million barrels of oil were extracted. The field experienced a gradual decline in production afterwards, approximately 8 percent per year, as is typical of fields when the reservoir pressure declines, and in the absence of secondary recovery technologies (such as water or gas injection). In 1985, Unocal tried waterflooding, and then polymer flooding, to improve production rates, and then in 1990 they began a horizontal drilling program to reach reservoirs impractical to exploit any other way.

Unocal continued to produce from the field until they sold all of their California production assets in 1996 to Nuevo Energy, as operated by Torch Energy Advisors. In 1997 Nuevo took over the operations of the four platforms directly, and in 2004 passed them on to Plains Exploration & Production on that firm's acquisition of Nuevo. Plains only ran the platforms for a little more than four months, selling the operation to DCOR in March 2005. As of 2009, DCOR retains operational control of the Dos Cuadras field.

According to the Minerals Management Service (MMS), the field retains about 11.4 million barrels of oil in reserves recoverable with current technology. At the beginning of 2008, there were 145 producing oil wells distributed between the four platforms.
