= Rincon Oil Field =

Large oil field on the central coast of southern California

Coordinates: 34.3406°N 119.3895°W

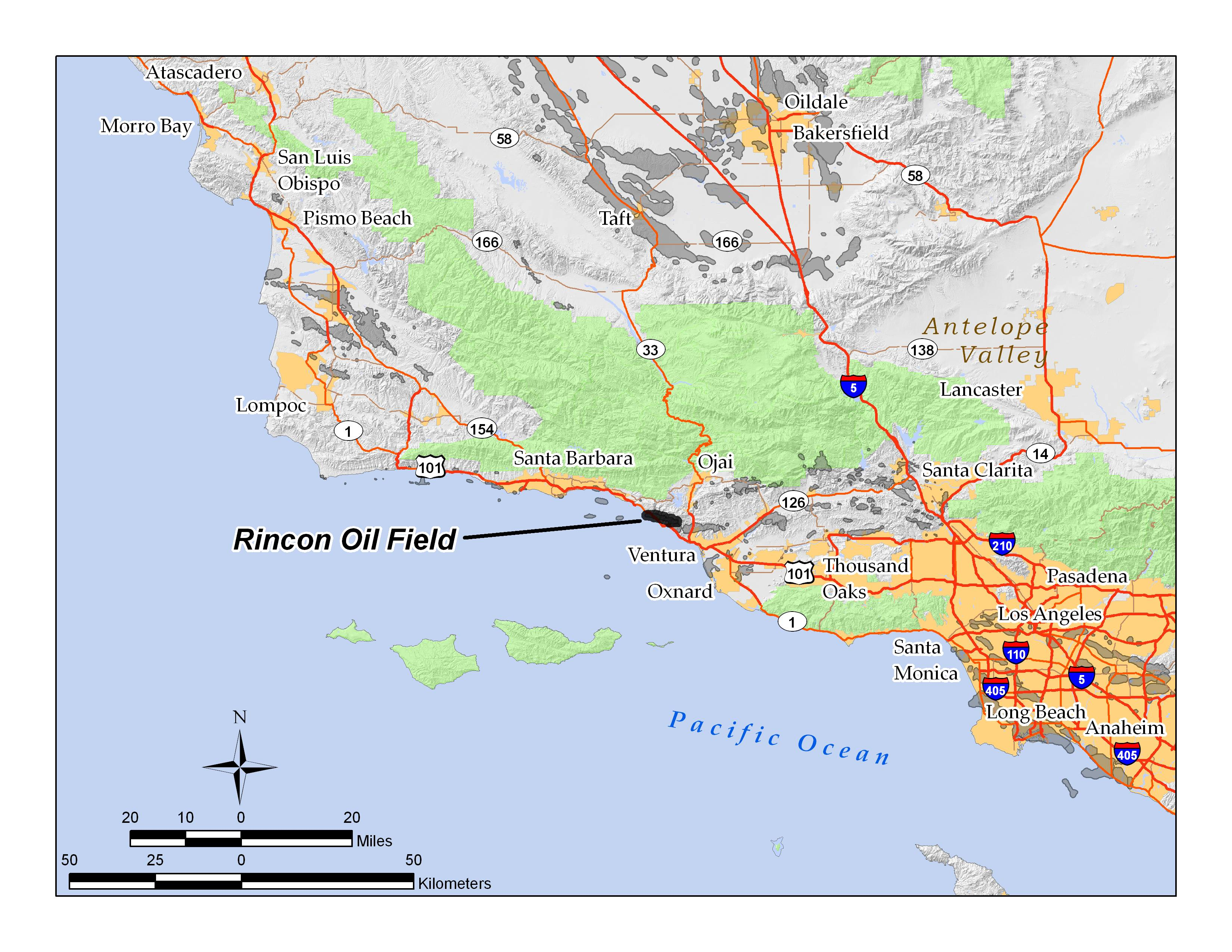
Location of the Rincon Oil Field in Southern California. Other oil fields are shown in dark gray.

The Rincon Oil Field is a large oil field on the coast of southern California, about 10 miles (16 km) northwest of the city of Ventura, and about 20 miles (32 km) east-southeast of the city of Santa Barbara. It is the westernmost onshore field in a series of three fields which follow the Ventura Anticline, an east–west trending feature paralleling the Transverse Ranges. Discovered in 1927, the oil field ranks 36th in California by the size of its recoverable oil reserves. Although mostly depleted—retaining only about 2.5% of its original oil according to the California Department of Conservation—it remained productive, with 77 wells active as of early 2008. Oil produced in the field flows through the M-143 pipeline, which parallels U.S. Highway 101 southeast to the Ventura Pump Station, at which point it joins a Tosco pipeline which carries it to Los Angeles area refineries. As of 2009, the primary operators of the field were Occidental Petroleum for the onshore portion, and Greka Energy for the offshore portion. The offshore part of the field is operated mainly from Rincon Island.

== Geographic setting ==
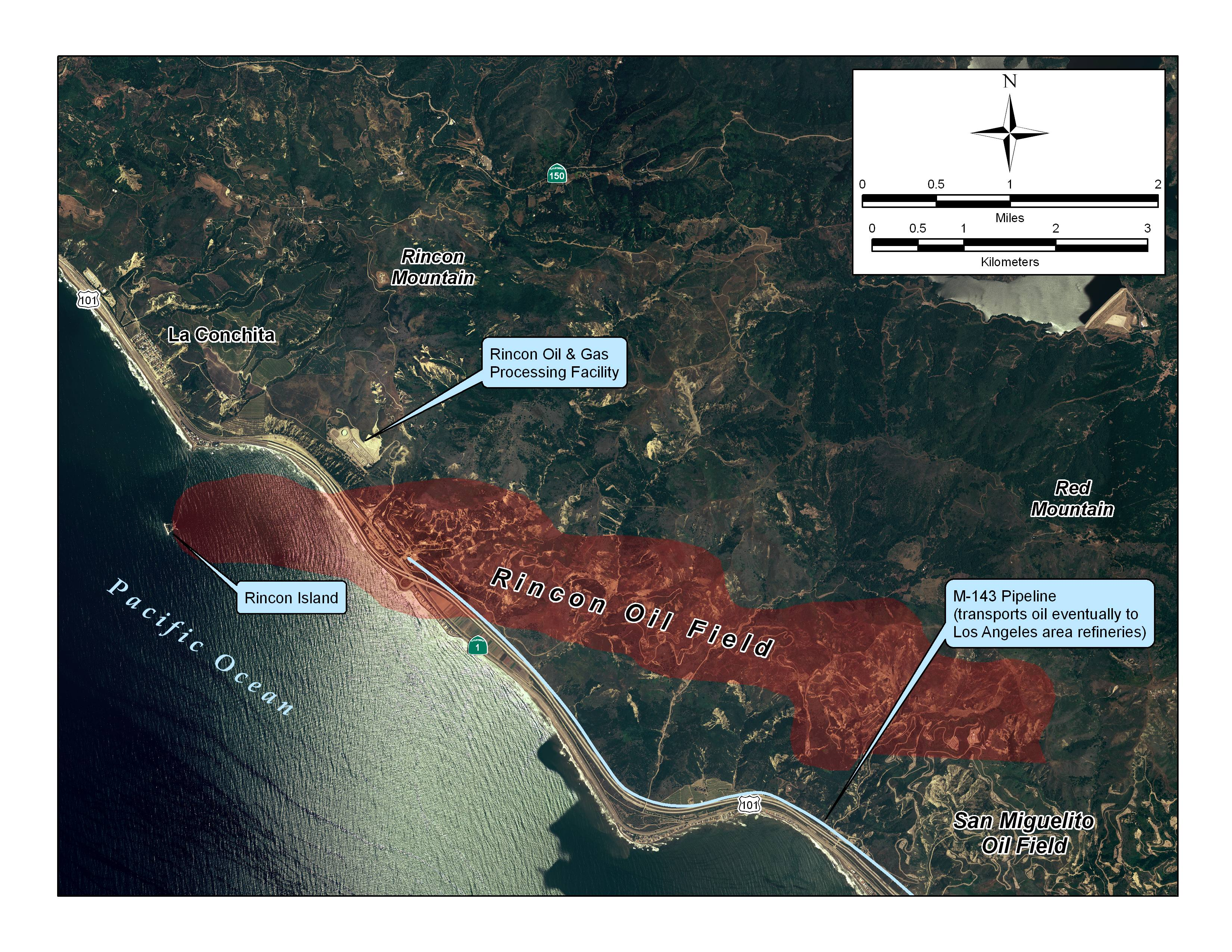
Detail of the Rincon Oil Field, on the Ventura County coast, on an aerial photograph basemap.

The field occupies a range of steep hills, loosely grouped with the Santa Ynez Mountains, which attain heights of over 2100 feet at Rincon Mountain and Red Mountain. Highway 101 runs along a narrow terrace at the base of the hills where they meet the Pacific Ocean. Drainage occurs through ephemeral streams that flow directly into the ocean. The entire area is highly prone to landslides; in 2005, the nearby unincorporated town of La Conchita experienced a deadly landslide that killed 10 people. During exceptionally rainy winters, Highway 101 can be cut by landslides.

Native vegetation consists of coastal sage scrub and chaparral. Climate in the area is Mediterranean, with cool rainy winters and mild summers, the heat being moderated by morning fog and low clouds. About 15 inches of rain fall each year, with slightly more at higher elevations

The Rincon Oil and Gas Processing Facility is adjacent to the oil field, on a hilltop which has been graded flat, about a mile east of Pitas Point. Rather than processing oil from the Rincon field, it receives and processes oil from the offshore Dos Cuadras and Carpinteria fields, feeding it into the M-143 pipeline which crosses through the Rincon field on the way to Ventura. A single massive 268,000 barrel tank, the feature of the plant visible at the greatest distance, stores oil from the Rincon field prior to shipping it through the pipeline.

The offshore portion of the field lies mostly in shallow water and is accessed via Rincon Island—an artificial island located about two-thirds of a mile south of Punta Gorda—connected to the mainland by a 3,000-foot (910 m) causeway. This plank causeway is too narrow for regular vehicular traffic, but contains pipelines to carry oilfield liquids – oil and produced water – as well as natural gas back to the shore, where they are processed at the La Conchita Oil and Gas Processing Facility.

== Geology ==
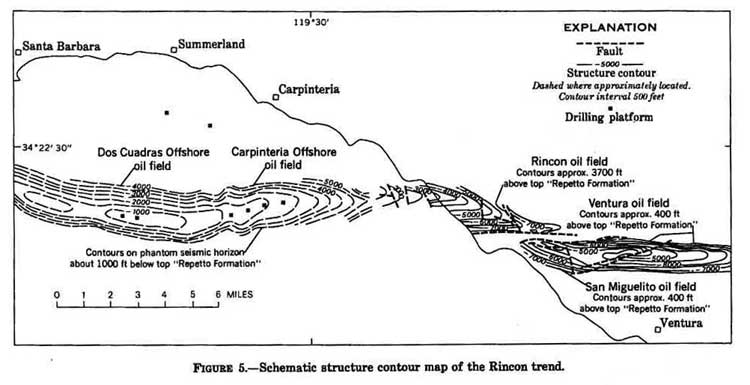
Map showing the Rincon anticlinal trend.

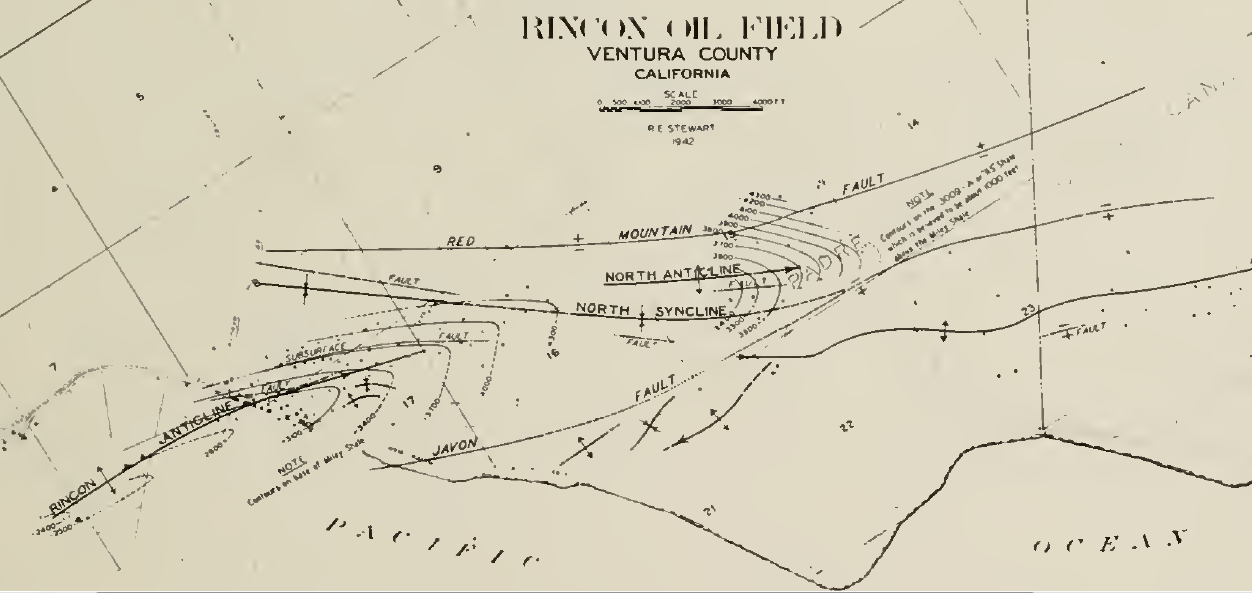
Rincon Oil Field Structure Map

The Rincon field is at the western end of the Ventura Anticline, a long narrow structure rather like the gabled roof on a long house, beneath which petroleum has collected in abundance. Two other similar onshore fields follow the anticline: the San Miguelito field to the southeast and the huge Ventura Oil Field beyond the San Miguelito, directly north of the city of Ventura. West of the Rincon field the anticline continues offshore, containing in the Carpinteria offshore field and the Dos Cuadras field, the source of the notorious 1969 oil spill. The surface geology of the Rincon field is distinctive, including some of the most landslide-prone terrain in California; much of the surface consists of Holocene sedimentary landslide deposits, greatly prone to renewed landslides.

All of the petroleum-bearing horizons in the Rincon field are in the Pico Formation, a thick sedimentary unit deposited in a shallow marine environment during the Pliocene, 5.3 to 1.6 million years ago. This formation contains sandstones, siltstones, and conglomerates, sufficiently porous under the anticline to hold abundant quantities of oil. The field has been divided into three general sections, listed from west to east as the Main Area, Oak Grove, and Padre Canyon areas. Each area has several producing horizons, all in the Pico, and ranging in depth from 3,400 feet in the shallow pool in the western Main Area to the "3rd Grubb" horizon at an average depth of 13,000 feet in the Oak Grove Area. Oil is "medium-grade" throughout the field, ranging in API gravity of 26 to 30.

== History, production, and operations ==
The Rincon field was discovered in December 1927, during the tail end of the California oil boom, the period when most of the state's largest fields were discovered and the transportation and refining infrastructure developed. Pan American Petroleum Company drilled the discovery well, Hobson Fee No. 3, to a depth of 2,557 feet into the "Shallow" and "Top" zones of the Pliocene-age Pico Formation, encountering a 1,500 psi reservoir pressure.

Other discoveries followed in the next several years. None were spectacular gushers, but they were sufficiently profitable to encourage further drilling. The "Miley" producing horizon was discovered in 1928, and other deeper producing zones within the main area appeared in 1929, with the deepest at 7,800 feet in June 1929. Chanslor-Canfield Midway Oil Co. discovered the Oak Grove Area in 1931, and Continental Oil Co. found the Padre Canyon area 1936. The deeper zones from both of these areas were not found for another 30 years.

Waterflooding of the field began in 1961, and most zones had active waterflood operations by the end of the 1960s.

Peak production from the entire field was in 1972, when the various producers reported over 4.6 million barrels for the year. This broke a usual pattern for California oil fields, in which the peak production was typically within the first few years after discovery, with a secondary peak occurring after the development of enhanced-recovery technologies in the 1960s.

In 1993, Vintage Petroleum acquired both the Rincon and adjacent San Miguelito oil fields from Mobil, Conoco, and Santa Fe Energy. For operational efficiency, Vintage combined the two adjacent oil fields into a single operating unit. Occidental Petroleum acquired Vintage in 2006, retaining their name and making them a wholly owned subsidiary, and still operates the onshore portion of the field under the Vintage banner.

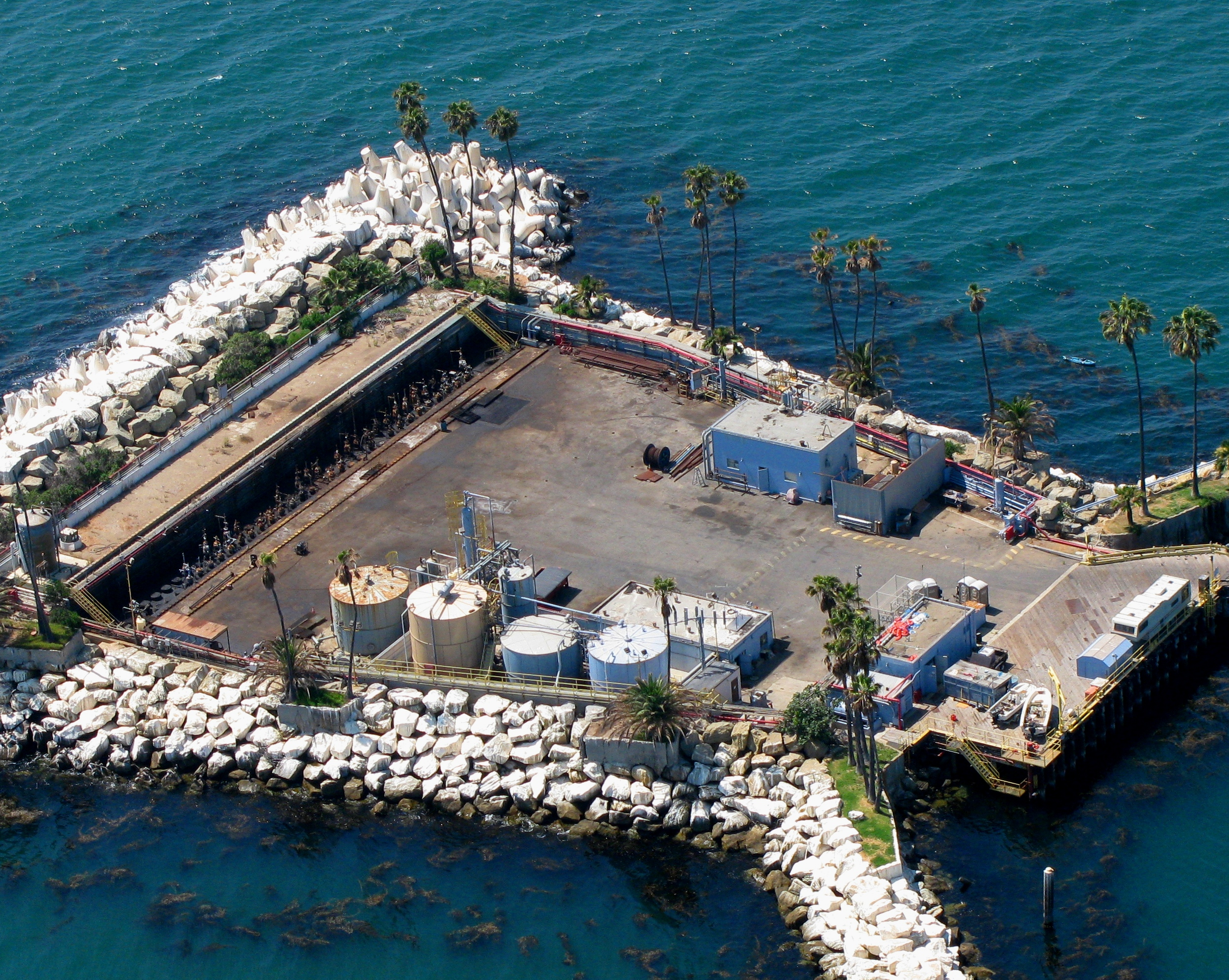
Central area of operations on Rincon Island. The island is connected to the mainland by a narrow 3,000-foot-long (910 m) causeway.

In 2002, Greka Energy acquired Rincon Island Limited Partnership, including Rincon Island and a small onshore area of operations alongside U.S. Highway 101. The onshore area contains a cluster of wells directionally drilled into offshore formations. Greka continues to operate these facilities as of 2010.
