= Santa Barbara Channel =

Pacific Ocean separating California from northern Channel Islands

Coordinates: 34°14′31″N 119°53′24″W

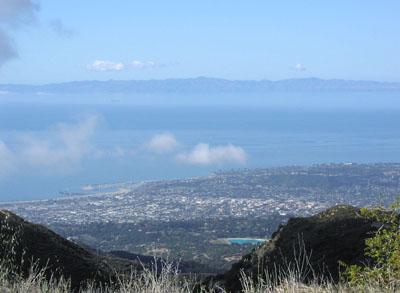
Looking south-southwest, across the Santa Barbara Channel; the city of Santa Barbara, California is below, and Santa Cruz Island is in the distance.

The Santa Barbara Channel is a portion of the Southern California Bight and separates the mainland of California from the northern Channel Islands. It is generally south of the city of Santa Barbara, and west of the Oxnard Plain in Ventura County.

It trends east–west, is approximately 130 kilometres (70 nmi) long and averages about 45 kilometres (24 nmi) across, becoming narrowest at its easternmost extremity where Anacapa Island is about 30 kilometres (16 nmi) from the mainland. During the last ice age, the four northern Channel Islands, including Santa Rosa Island, were conjoined into Santa Rosae, a single island that was only five miles (8 km) off the coast.

The islands are visible from the mainland on clear days. Excursion boats cross the channel, taking visitors to watch whales and visit the islands. In the perpendicular (east-west) direction, huge cargo ships and tankers occupy a major shipping lane on their way to or from the ports of Los Angeles and Long Beach.

The Channel is the location of numerous oil fields, some of which have substantial reserves. These include the Ellwood, Summerland, Carpinteria offshore and Dos Cuadras fields. In 1969, the Dos Cuadras was the point of origin of a major oil spill, which came about when oil spurted at high pressure through faults and cracks around a zone which had recently been drilled for the first time. Public outrage over the massive environmental damage inflicted by this spill, which covered hundreds of square miles of the channel and fouled beaches from Ventura to Goleta, was a major spur to the budding environmental movement. The Santa Barbara Channel contains the world's largest natural oil seepage – Coal Oil Point. Goleta Point is a nearby extension into the channel.

Point Arguello, a headland near the city of Lompoc, was the site of the Honda Point disaster in 1923, in which seven US Navy destroyers ran aground, in the largest peacetime loss of US Navy ships.

== Prehistory ==
Prior to the Holocene era sea levels were considerably lower, such that the water width separating the islands from the mainland was much less, making biological colonization as well as human transport across the channel easier. In recent times the Native American Chumash peoples navigated these waters with ease in small watercraft, allowing communication and trade between island and mainland villages. C. Michael Hogan reviews some of the theories of colonization of the rare species Torrey Pine, Pinus torreyana to the islands, suggesting that it is likely that Chumash peoples carried the initial cones in their Tomols. The pygmy mammoth, an extinct, endemic species, were capable swimmers able to cross the channel and adapt to the island environment by insular dwarfism.

== Risk of ship-whale collisions ==
As of at least 2011, some species of whale (including blue, fin, and humpback) have begun to feed in a new area north of the Santa Cruz and Santa Rosa islands of the Santa Barbara Channel. These whales are at risk to be struck by ships passing through a shipping lane used to move goods south to Los Angeles and Long Beach ports. About 100 collisions have been documented off of the coast of California since 1982, which includes a rate of about 6 per year today, possibly more due to the difficulty of observing the incidents. Scientists estimate that over 80 endangered whales are killed from vessel collisions off the U.S. west coast each year.

== See also ==
- Offshore oil and gas in California
