= San Miguelito Oil Field =

Oil field near Ventura, California

Coordinates: 34.3171°N 119.3471°W

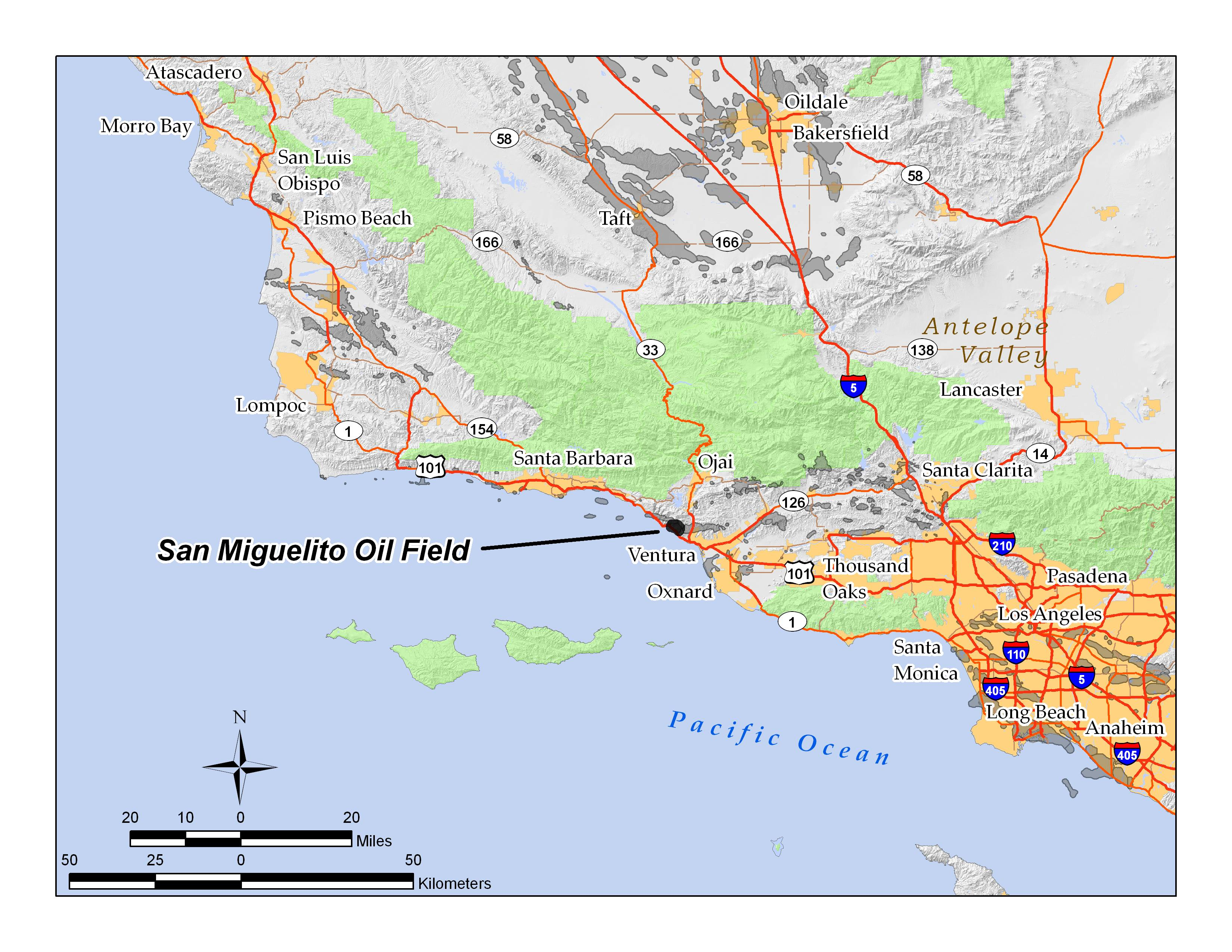
The San Miguelito Oil Field in Ventura County, California. Other oil fields are shown in dark gray.

The San Miguelito Oil Field is a large and currently productive oil field in the hills northwest of the city of Ventura in southern California in the United States. The field is close to the coastline, with U.S. Highway 101 running past at the base of the hills and is sandwiched between the larger Ventura Oil Field to the east and the Rincon Oil Field, which is partially offshore, to the north and northwest. Discovered in 1931, and with about 125 million barrels of cumulative production out of its original 520 million, it ranks 44th in the state by size. It is currently operated by CalNRG Operating LLC which acquired ownership of the field in 2021 after the bankruptcy of California Resources Corporation, a former subsidiary of Occidental Petroleum.

== Geographic setting ==
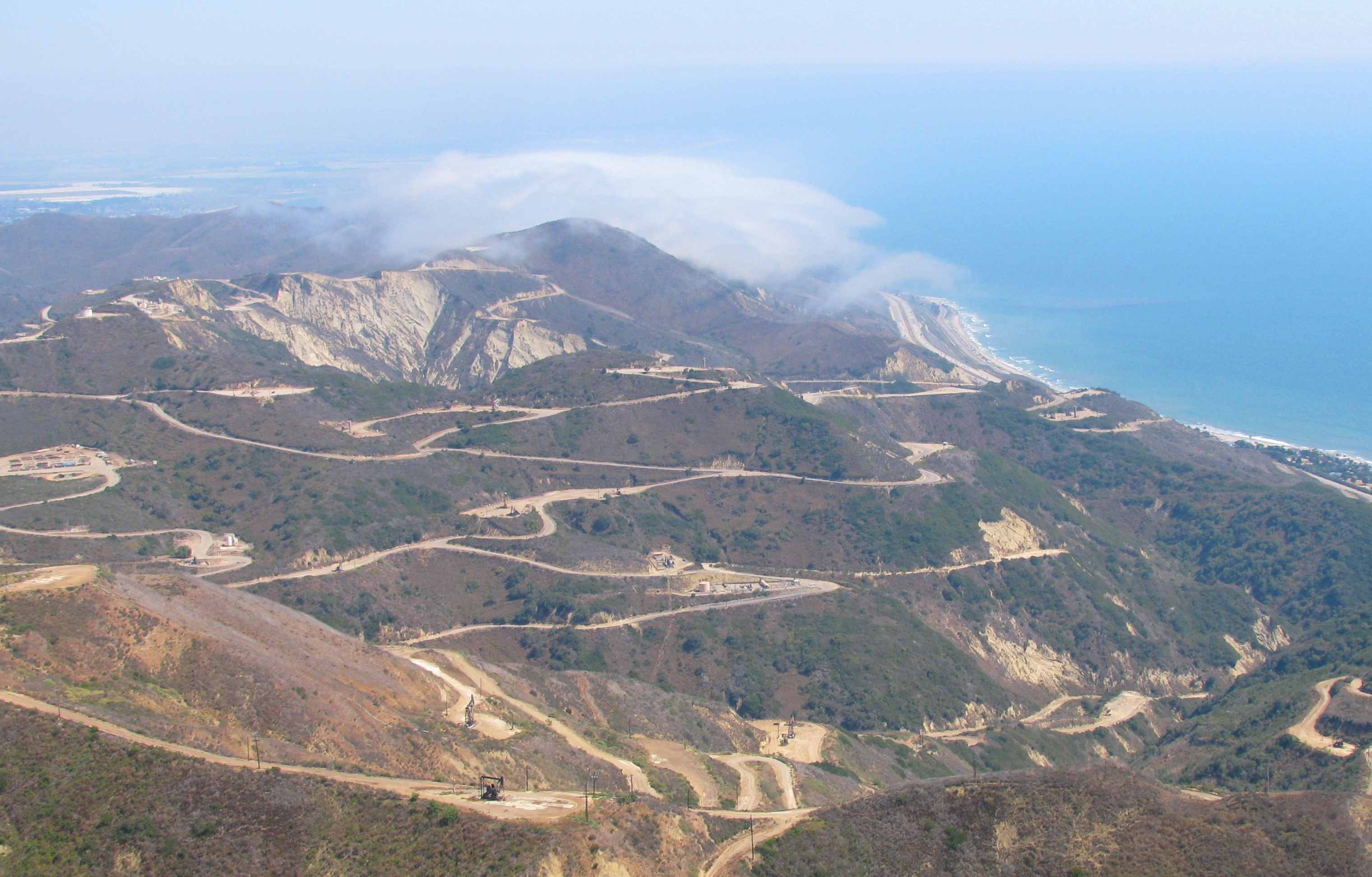
A part of the San Miguelito Field, from the north-northwest, viewed from the air.

The oil field is one of several following the east-west trend of the Transverse Ranges: to the west is the Rincon Oil Field and the offshore Dos Cuadras field, and to the east the much larger Ventura Oil Field. Total productive area of the field, projected to the surface, encompasses about 940 acres (3.8 km^{2}), about one and a half square miles. On the coast between Ventura and Carpinteria, the stretch known locally as "the Rincon", the hills rise steeply from the shore, with the coastal U.S. Highway 101 occupying much of the narrow strip between the beach and the sharply rising hills. A cluster of seaside homes is on the ocean side of Highway 101 at Solimar Beach (marked as "Dulah" on the USGS topographic map of the area). One of the field's pumpjacks is visible on the mountain side of the highway, at sea level, just north of the Solimar Beach exit; almost all the other oil wells are out of the line of sight from any public road, as are the other oilfield structures (tank farms, processing units, and others).

The predominant vegetation in the hills is chaparral and coastal sage scrub. Terrain on the hills is steep, and the unpaved access roads make numerous switchbacks. Some of the hillsides are bare where landslides have stripped them, and the terrain in this area is unusually prone to landslides.

Climate in the area is Mediterranean, with cool, rainy winters and mild, dry summers, cooled by morning coastal clouds. Elevations on the field range from sea level to over 1,200 feet (370 m) on the highest ridgetops. Runoff from the oil field is west and southwest down ephemeral, seasonal drainages into the Pacific Ocean.

== Geology ==
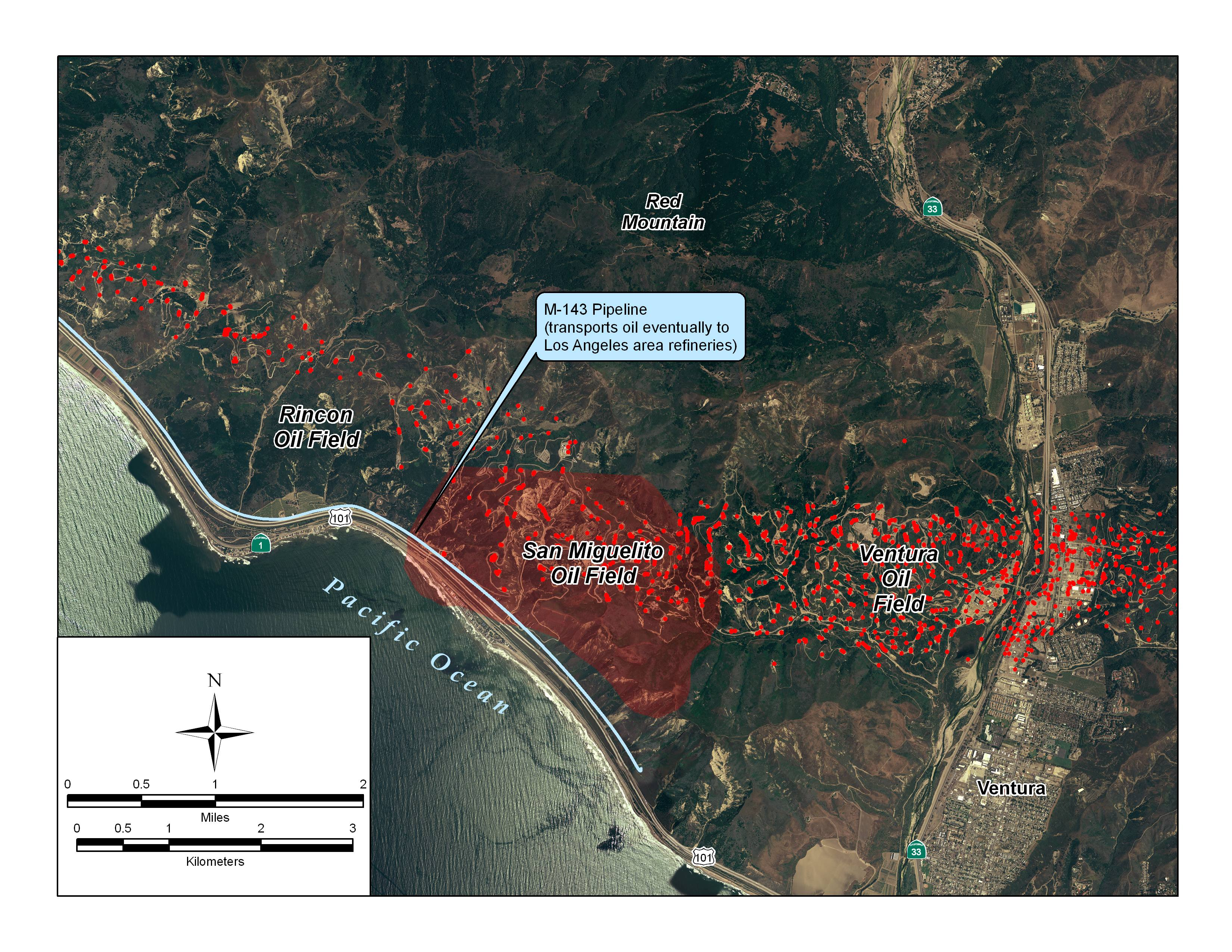
Detail of the San Miguelito field, showing adjacent oil fields. Red dots are locations of active oil wells as of 2008.

The San Miguelito field is an accumulation of oil along the westernmost portion of the Ventura anticline, bounded on the north by the Grubb Thrust Fault, where the fault has pushed another closed anticline above the end of the Ventura Anticline. Petroleum-bearing units are sands of Pliocene and Miocene age, and are given numerical designations increasing with depth: 1st Grubb, 2nd Grubb, down to 5th Grubb (as well as an additional "Grubb D" zone for units lower than 5th Grubb). These units are present on either side of the fault, but are offset by about 4,000 vertical feet. It is a deep reservoir, with the uppermost producing unit at an average depth of 6,800 feet (2,100 m) below ground surface, and the lowest over 14,000 feet (4,300 m) deep. The California Department of Conservation groups together the Grubb 1-3 zones, Grubb 4-5 zones, Grubb D (Deep) zones as three distinct producing horizons.

The oil is medium grade with an API gravity of 31 in the first four Grubb zones, 25 in the 5th.

== History, production and operations ==
While the adjacent large Ventura Avenue oil field was discovered in 1919, it was not until 1931 that prospectors thought of searching for oil near the western end of the Ventura Anticline, where the borehole had to reach a considerable depth before finding oil. The discovery well for the field was the Continental Oil Co. "Grubb No. 1", which reached 7,623 feet (2,323 m) below ground surface, drilling from a ridgeline about a half mile from the ocean, about 800 feet (240 m) above sea level. It flowed over 600 barrels a day, and development of the field began.

In 1944 the 2nd Grubb Zone was discovered, and in 1950, the 3rd Grubb. Peak production from the field was in 1951 at 4.5 million barrels of oil. Further zones were discovered, with the 4th Grubb coming online in 1970, and the 5th Grubb in 1979. By 1983, the deepest well was already producing from 14,752 feet (4,496 m).

In order to increase reservoir pressure, several waterflooding projects have been undertaken on the field, commencing in 1955. Most of the water injection has been done in the Grubb 1-3 zones; only one waterflood well was active as of 2009 in Grubb 4-5, with 31 in Grubb 1-3.

In 1993, Vintage Petroleum acquired both the San Miguelito and adjacent Rincon fields from Mobil, Conoco, and Santa Fe Energy. To improve operational efficiency, Vintage combined the two adjacent oil fields into a single operating unit. Occidental Petroleum acquired Vintage in 2006, retaining their name and making them a wholly owned subsidiary, and operated the Rincon and San Miguelito fields under the Vintage banner. In 2014, Occidental Petroleum spun off their California assets into California Resources Corporation. Finally, both the San Miguelito oil field and adjacent Rincon oil field were acquired by CalNRG Operating LLC in 2021. These fields, in addition to others, have been remediated and rehabilitated after neglect by previous operators.
