= Ventura Oil Field =

Oil field adjacent to the city of Ventura, California, United States

Coordinates: 34.3146°N 119.2685°W

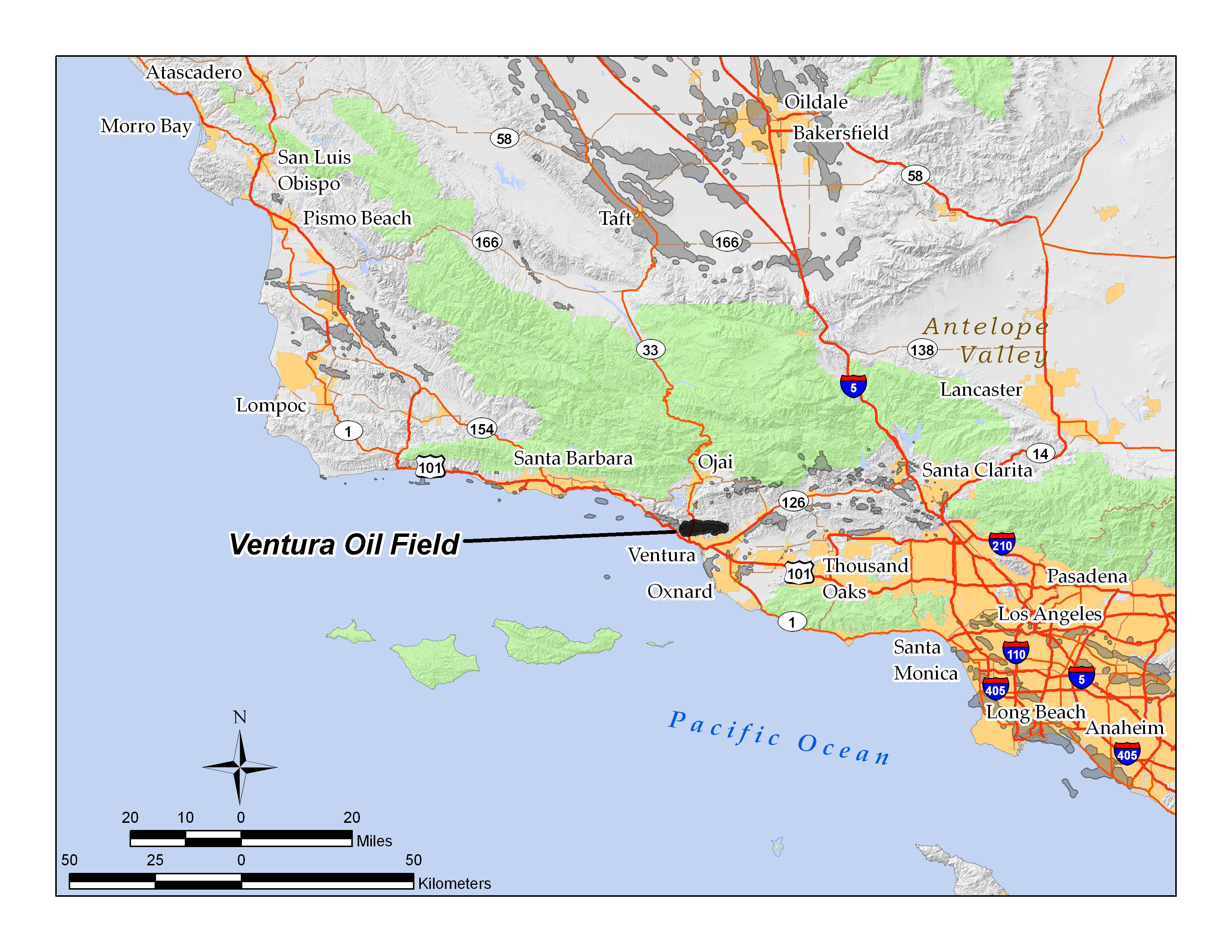
The Ventura Oil Field in Ventura County, California. Other oil fields are shown in dark gray.

The Ventura Oil Field is a large and currently productive oil field in the hills immediately north of the city of Ventura in southern California in the United States. It is bisected by California State Route 33, the freeway connecting Ventura to Ojai, and is about eight miles (13 km) long by two across, with the long axis aligned east to west. Discovered in 1919, and with a cumulative production of over 1 billion barrels (160,000,000 m^{3}) of oil as of 2023 out of its original 3.3 billion. It is the tenth-largest producing oil field in California, retaining approximately 50 million barrels in reserve, and had 423 wells still producing. As of 2009 it was entirely operated by Aera Energy LLC.

== Geographic setting ==
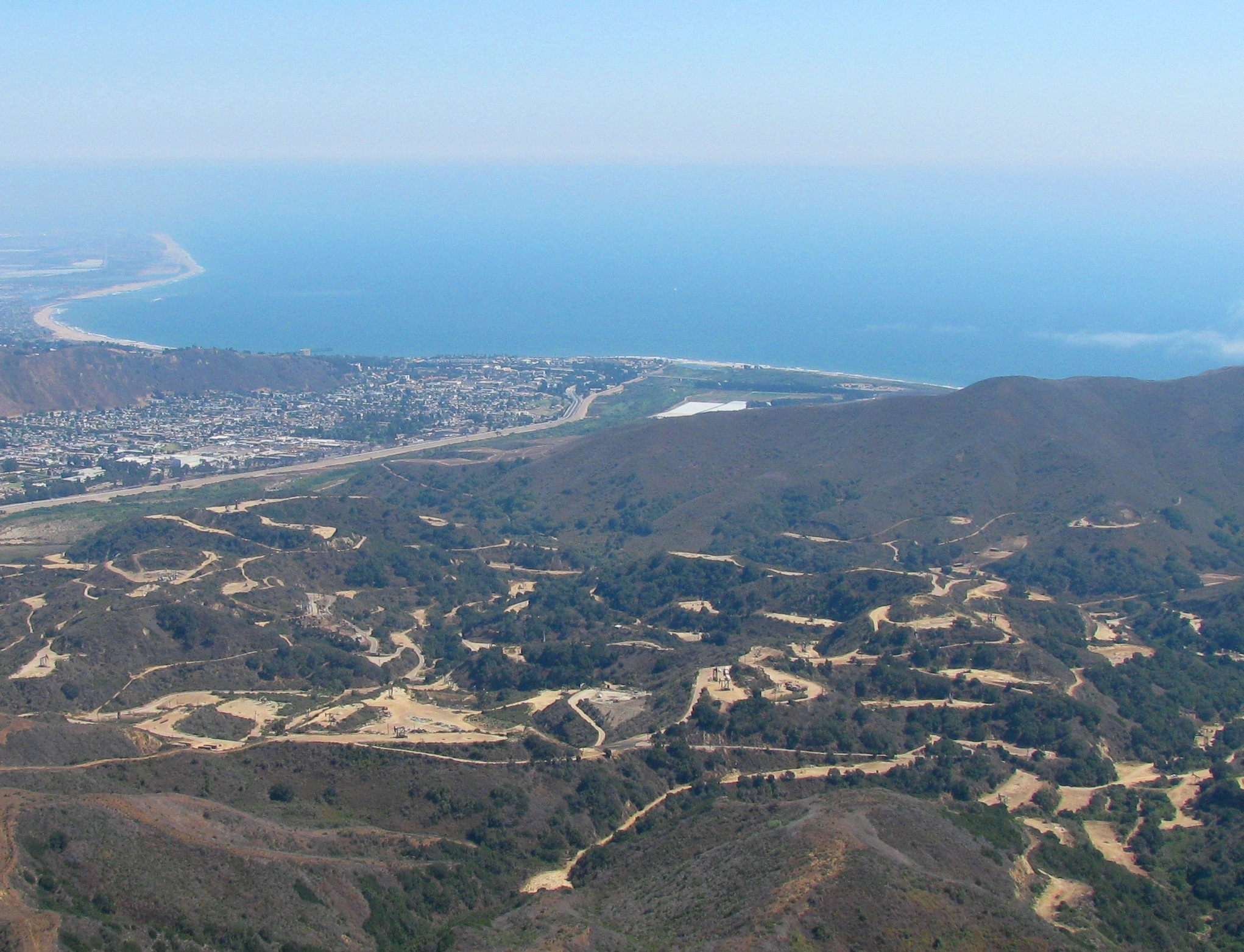
Ventura Oil Field, from the north-northwest, showing the city of Ventura in the distance.

The oil field is on and beneath the ranges of hills northwest, north and northeast of the city of Ventura. The Ventura River, flowing down from Ojai, cuts through the field, and empties into the Pacific Ocean at Ventura. Native vegetation in the hills is predominantly chaparral and coastal sage scrub, and riparian woodland is found along the course of the Ventura River. Terrain on the hills is steep, and the roads to well pads, tanks, and other infrastructure make numerous switchbacks. Most of the field is hidden from view from the city because of the first steep range of hills. The oil field is one of several following the east–west trend of the Transverse Ranges at this point: to the west are the San Miguelito Oil Field and the Rincon Oil Field, and to the east, across the Santa Clara River valley, the large South Mountain Oil Field adjacent to Santa Paula and the smaller Saticoy Oil Field along the Santa Clara River east of Saticoy. To the north are the smaller Ojai and Santa Paula fields. Total productive area of the field, projected to the surface, encompasses 3,410 acres (13.8 km^{2}).

California State Route 33, which follows the route of the Ventura River through the hills and through the field, provides much of the vehicular access, and other access roads come directly from the city of Ventura to the south.

Climate in the area is Mediterranean, with cool, rainy winters and mild, dry summers, cooled by morning coastal clouds. Elevations on the field range from about 40 feet (12 m) above sea level along the Ventura River to around 1,200 feet (370 m) on the highest ridges both east and west of the river. Runoff from the oil field is into the Ventura River, although some of the eastern portions of the field drain south into the Santa Clara River.

== Geology ==
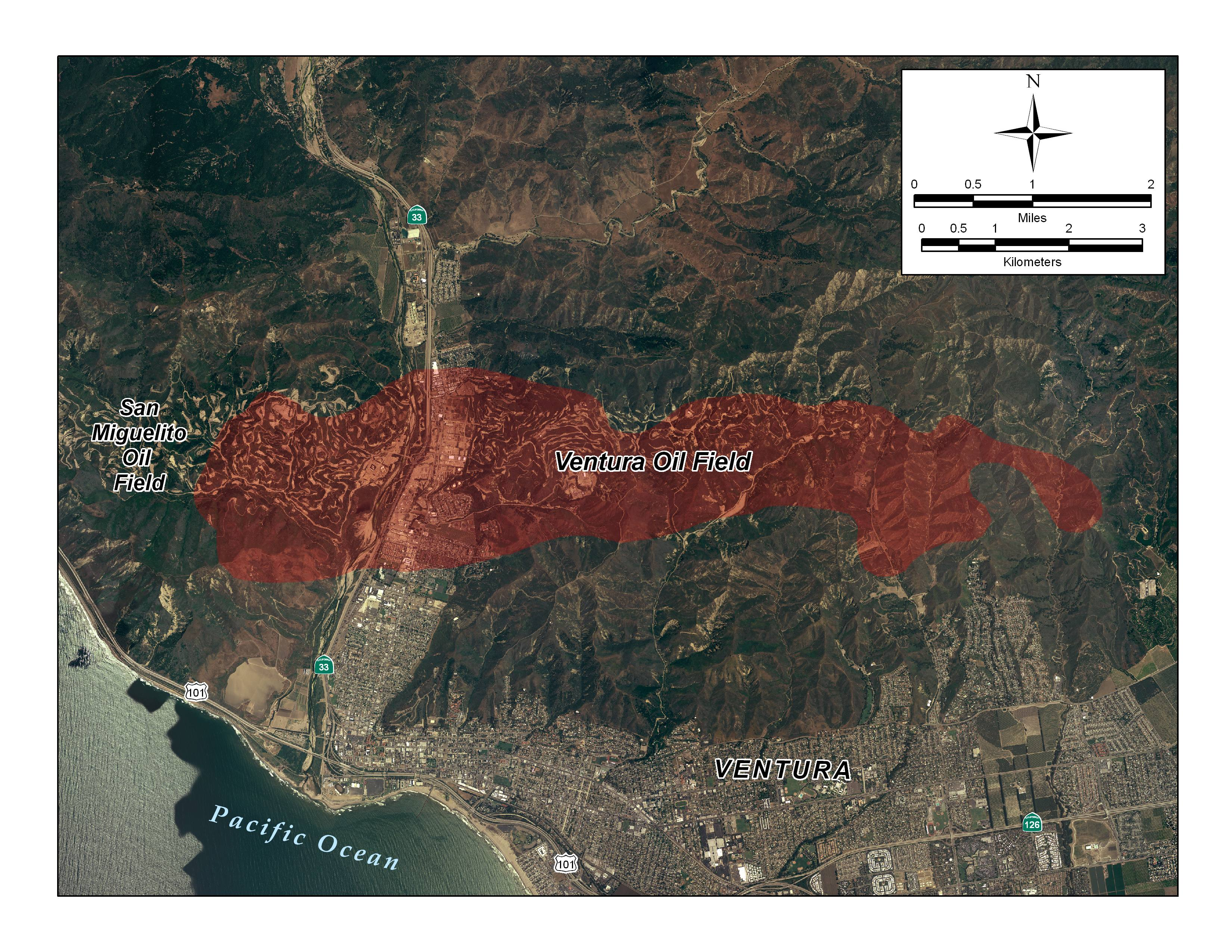
Detail of the Ventura field, showing the city of Ventura

In the Ventura field, the large-scale structural feature responsible for petroleum accumulation is the Ventura Anticline, an east–west trending geologic structure 16 miles (26 km) long, visible in the numerous rock outcrops in the rugged topography of the area. This anticline dips steeply on both sides, with the dip angle ranging from 30 to 60 degrees, resulting in a series of rock beds resembling a long house with a gabled roof, under which oil and gas collect in abundance. Within this feature, the primary petroleum-bearing unit is the Pico Formation, a sedimentary unit of turbidite sands of high porosity (16 to 20 percent)). Additionally, oil is found in the underlying Santa Margarita Formation. Eight different oil-bearing zones have been identified by number, 1st through 8th based on depth, with the 2nd zone the first to be discovered, in March 1919 by the Shell Oil Company. The pools range in depth from 3,680 feet (1,120 m) to over 12,000 feet (3,700 m), although depth within each pool varies greatly; the discovery well into the 2nd zone, which has an average depth of 5,180 feet (1,580 m), had a total depth of only 3,500 feet (1,100 m).

The underlying Monterey Formation is presumed to be the source of the oil accumulations in the Ventura field, as well as the other two fields in the same geologic trend. The Monterey Formation is rich in organic matter, averaging 3-5 percent but reaching 23 percent in some areas. Oil likely migrated upwards during the late Pliocene, becoming trapped in the folds and structural traps of the higher rocks of the anticline which form an impermeable caps. Some of the oil-bearing zones, such as the 4th and 5th, are capped by the Barnard Fault, which provides an additional structural trap. Even with the impermeable caps and structural traps, there are enough breaks in the structure for significant natural tar seeps to occur; indeed the entire region is riddled with natural seeps, and tar was used by the native Chumash peoples as a sealant for their watercraft.

Oil gravity and sulfur content is similar in all pools in the field, with an API gravity of 29-30 and approximately 1 percent sulfur by weight.

== History, production and operations ==
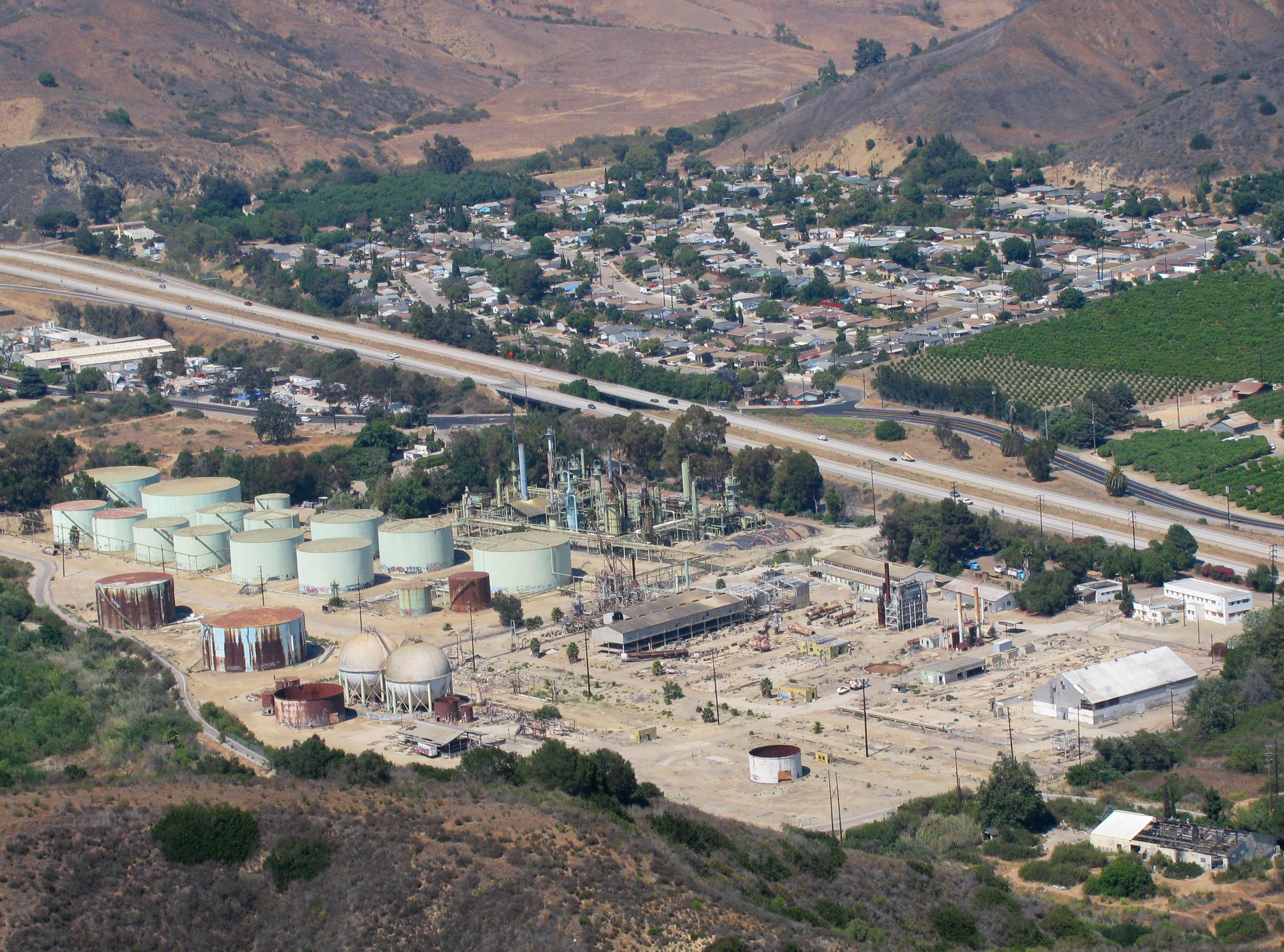
Former oil storage and processing facility along Route 33, across from a residential area

The area was worked initially in 1885, followed by Ventura County Power Company drilling 7 shallow gas wells in 1903. While they reached depths of between 400 and 800 feet (240 m), it is not known if they produced oil. In May 1916 the first commercially viable well, No. "Lloyd" 1, was drilled by State Consolidated Oil Company to a depth of 2,555 feet. Initial production consisted of 100 barrels a day. Shell Oil drilled the first well into what is now known as the 2nd Pool, in the Pico Formation, in March 1919, reaching a depth of 3,498 feet (1,066 m).

A major real estate boom in Ventura resulted with the development of the oil fields in the 1920s. The affordability of automobiles and the building of better roads to Los Angeles and the opening of the Rincon Sea Level Road to Santa Barbara in 1913 also contributed to the rapid growth of the city.

While the field was productive from the earliest years, it had a reputation for difficulty, and challenged the technological skill of the early 20th-century drillers. The Lloyd No. 102 well, operated by the Associated Oil Company, was the deepest production well in the world in 1928, producing from a depth of 7,210 feet (2,200 m). Later wells reached even greater depths, as drillers attempted to find the bottom of this extraordinarily productive but challenging field. Shell Oil Company's Taylor 653 reached a depth of 21,500 feet (6,600 m), penetrating into the Miocene age Monterey Formation, but found no oil at those depths. Deeper reservoir oil was extremely hot; the temperature of oil in the 4th zone, discovered in 1925, and determined later to have an average depth of 9,150 feet (2,790 m), was approximately 300 °F (149 °C).

Production at the field peaked in the 1950s, at which time the field became the 12th most productive in the United States. In 1954 alone the field produced over 31 million barrels of oil. As production began to decline after 1954, technologies for enhanced recovery became available. Waterflooding – the reinjection of produced water to increase reservoir pressure, allowing wells with diminishing returns to flow more freely – commenced in most zones in the late 1950s and 1960s, and continues in the present.

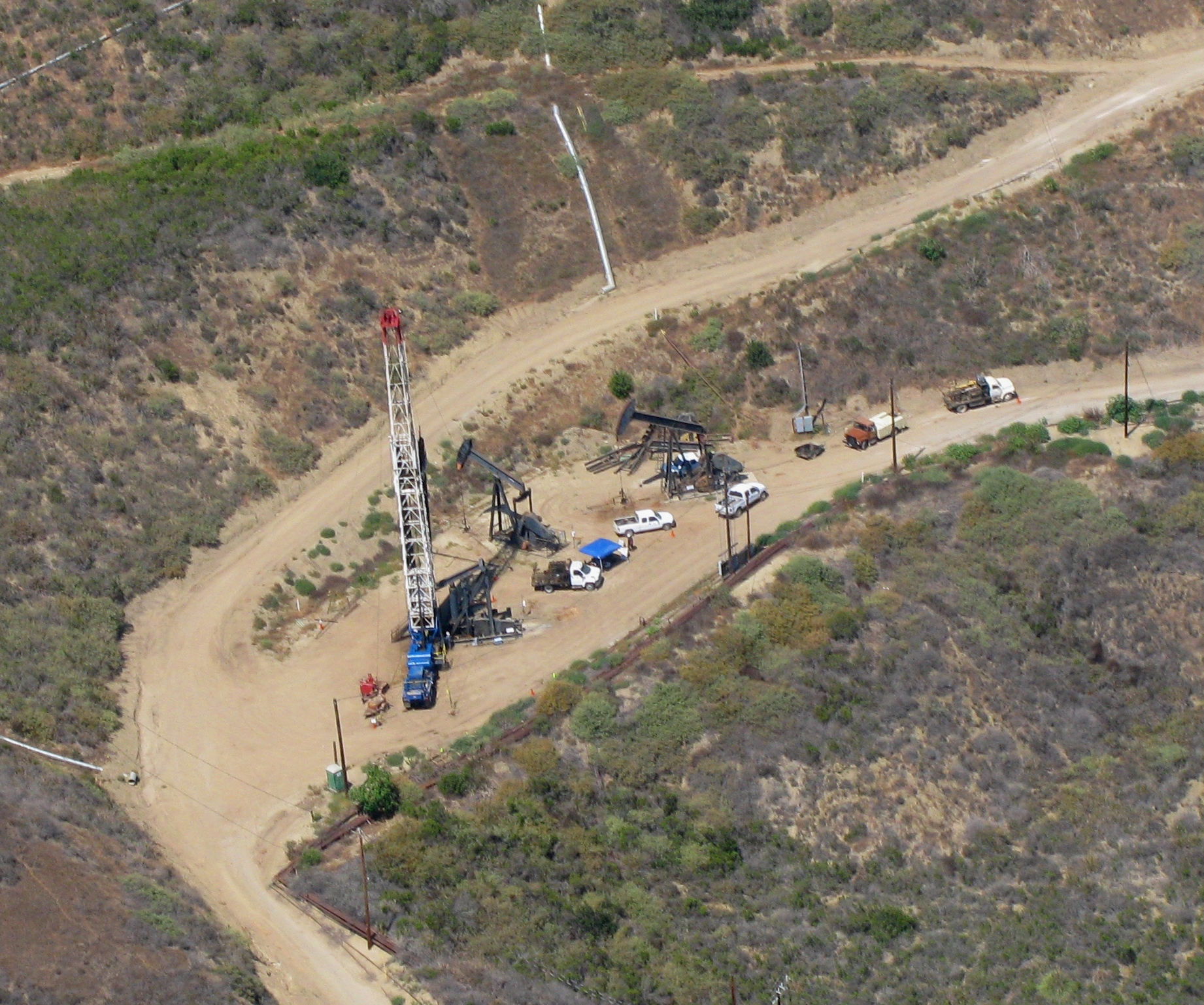
Active workover rig, Ventura Oil Field

Aera Energy LLC, a joint venture of ExxonMobil and Shell Oil Co., eventually acquired the entire field, by consolidation of their predecessor company's operations and acquisition of the few remaining independent operators in the area. Their neighbor on the abutting San Miguelito and Rincon fields to the west is Vintage Petroleum, a subsidiary of Occidental Petroleum.

In 2009 Aera was still producing an average of 11,600 barrels of oil a day from the field, making the company the largest oil and gas producer in Ventura County. Aera reported the production of 14,000 barrels of crude oil and 7.8 billion cubic feet of natural gas a day in 2016 from 414 wells in an area of 4,300 acres (1,700 ha). Aera's permits, approved from 1948 to 1956, were granted without environmental impact reviews. Shell and ExxonMobil agreed in 2022 to sell the all the assets of Aera to a German asset management group IKAV.
