= La Conchita, California =

Unincorporated community in California, United States

- Unincorporated community
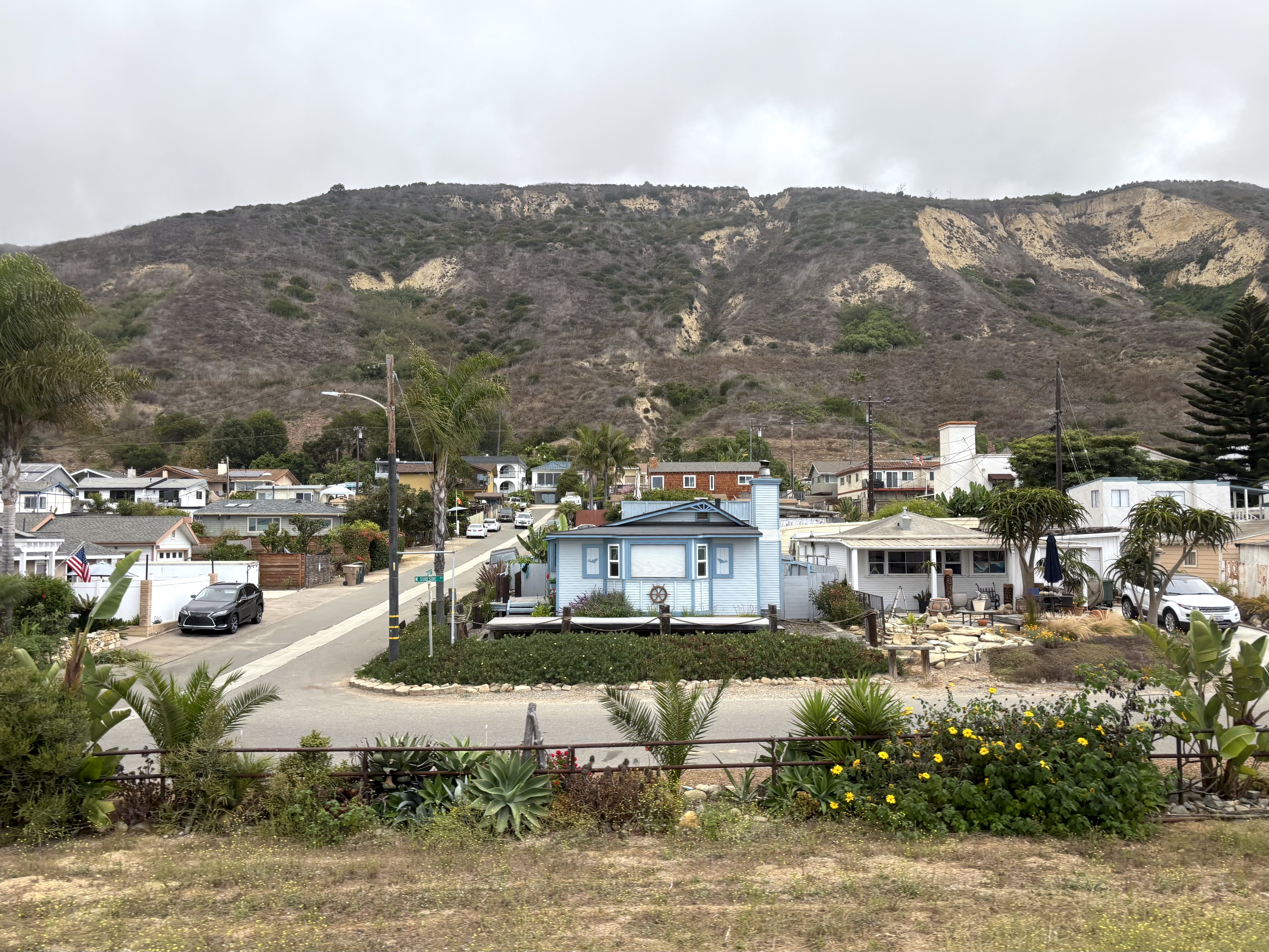

- Location within the state of California La Conchita, California (the United States)
- Coordinates: 34°21′50″N 119°26′53″W
- Country: United States
- State: California
- County: Ventura

Population (2000)
  - Total: 338
- Time zone: UTC-8 (Pacific (PST))
  - Summer (DST): UTC-7 (PDT)
- ZIP codes: 93001
- Area code: 805
- GNIS feature ID: 1661263

La Conchita (/ˌlɑː kənˈtʃiːtə/; Spanish for "The Little Shell") is a small unincorporated community in western Ventura County, California, United States, on U.S. Route 101, just southeast of the Santa Barbara county line. The ZIP Code is 93001, and the community is served by area code 805.

On January 10, 2005, a major landslide occurred in La Conchita. The 2005 landslide killed 10 people, and destroyed or damaged dozens of houses. The landslide recurred over part of a previous landslide in 1995.

== History ==
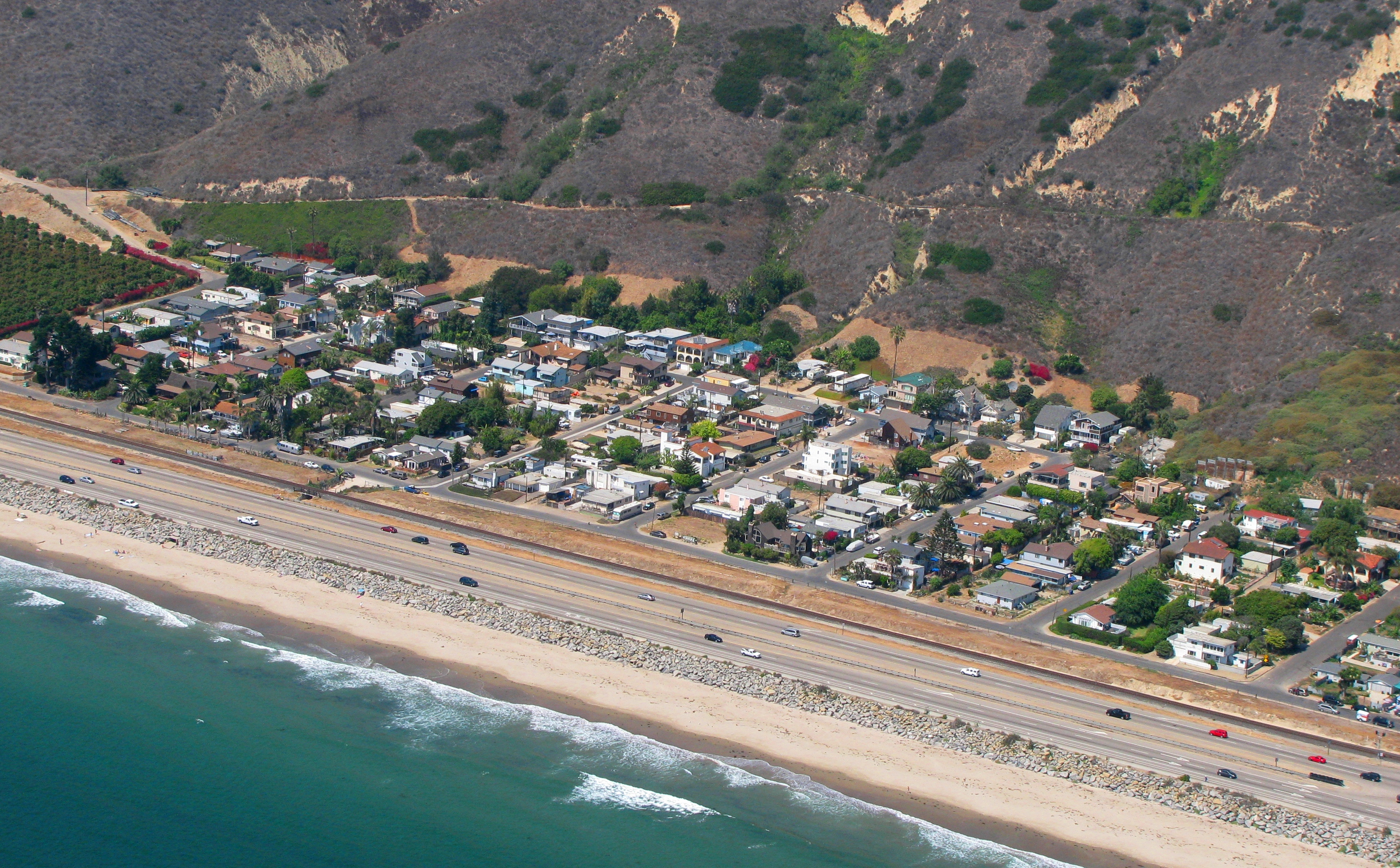
La Conchita from the air, looking northeast; the landslides into the town are visible on the extreme right

"La Conchita", Spanish for little conch shell, was first used as the name of a spur on the Southern Pacific railroad line in the 1880s and it was a name generally used to describe a broader area than the present day village. During this time until 1923, the small beach settlement was named "Punta" and the street names still carried today (San Fernando, Ojai, Bakersfield, Carpinteria, etc.) commemorated the home town areas of the railroad workers who settled in the town while building the Southern Pacific line. The name change and designated area then known as La Conchita are crucially important to any understanding of the region today and its geologic history. Up through the 1930s as historically documented, the area from Bates Road down to Mussel Shoals (then known as Mussel Rock) was referred to as La Conchita.

=== 1817–1912 ===
Prior to the establishment of the village of Punta, the coastal area was named Punta Gorda. "Punta Gorda", Spanish for massive point, referred to the outstanding feature of this coastal area, a large rock promontory. A monk who stopped at the Mission San Buenaventura in 1817 first mentioned the site. The history of the hamlet of La Conchita is closely tied to developments in the Rincon Point area. The name "The Rincon" was also routinely used to designate the area from Carpinteria's Rincon Point to Ventura's Sea Cliff. From 1850 until 1873 when Ventura County was established, Punta Gorda was part of Santa Barbara County.

What is now the community of La Conchita was originally part of the 4,460-acre (18.0 km^{2}) Mexican land grant Rancho El Rincon given by Governor José Figueroa to Teodoro Arrellanes in 1835. Arrellanes’ daughter Maria married Dr. Matthew Biggs, and the property was transferred to Biggs in 1855. During the 1860s following a long period of drought, the record rainfall of 1868 produced major flooding throughout the county. It was during this time that major portions of the old ranchos were subdivided and sold off by heirs to an increasing number of arriving immigrants and settlers. In 1885, Dr. C. B. Bates, born in England, and pharmacist Benigno Gutierrez, born in Chile, bought Dr. Biggs's remaining Rancho El Rincon holdings.

The Homestead Act of 1862 had brought many newcomers to settle in California. Levi Gould Stanchfield, born in Leeds, Maine in 1841, established a ranch at Punta Gorda in 1875 where he raised sheep, grew lima beans and built a ranch house at Mussel Rock. Stanchfield was married to Luisa Arenas. Her father, Luis Arenas, held several land grants, and in 1838 was Mayor of Los Angeles. Her mother Josepfa Palomares was the sister of Ygnacio Palomares one of the first settlers of the San Gabriel Valley. Stanchfield sold the property to Charles. E. Ablett in 1879. Ablett, born in England, was well known as a druggist in Santa Barbara and a key figure in the homesteading activity of the Punta Gorda area from the 1880s on. At this time, the La Conchita section of the Southern Pacific railroad coast route was almost completed and the village of Punta was established. Among the founding families of Punta were the Callis from Kentucky; the Mullins from Charlottetown, Prince Edward Island, Canada; and the Gaynors from Ireland. Members of these families were prominent in local history for the next sixty years.

From 1880-1916 a U.S. post office was sited in Punta, and Punta Gorda served as a stop for both the stagecoach and the railroad. Charles E. Ablett served as the first postmaster. In 1883 the Rincon School district was established and classes were first held in the home of Robert Callis with nine pupils in attendance. The 1883 census listed 17 children living in Punta. In 1890 the name was changed to the Punta Gorda School District, and the first school structure was built in the village. The Ventura County Register of 1890, as well as the Rincon district electoral records from 1900–1916, reflects a varied mix of ethnicities among the residents in Punta and the Rincon area.

A right of way was granted to the Southern Pacific railroad in 1887 and narrow ledges were blasted for the tracks. Since there was no room for a wagon road after that, the idea of building a series of wooden causeway around the cliffs was first developed in 1910. The idea was taken from the European models that existed at the time in Monte Carlo. The "causeway," a timber pile trestle with a 16-foot-wide (4.9 m) roadway, was built as part of the Rincon Sea Level Road, a cooperative project between Santa Barbara and Ventura Counties. By 1912, Rincon Road became part of the state highway system. In 1926, it was replaced with cement concrete pavement.

Farming remained the predominant occupation of the area through the First World War. It was a precarious way of life, since there was little fresh water available. During the severe drought of 1898, news accounts detailed the record number of livestock being driven north to pasture and to early market as well as the constant drilling efforts for sources of artesian water to ease the plight of the farmers.

Oil leasing, which started in the area as early as the 1850s, became increasingly important. The Punta Gorda Land & Oil Company was established in 1900. The Rincon Oil Field, adjacent to the town on the south, was discovered in 1927.

=== 1913–1926 ===
Dr. Bates's son, Robert W. Bates, returned from military service in Europe during World War I and worked the Rincon ranch along with his brother Edward. A parcel map of La Conchita was first recorded in the 1920s. At that time it was primarily occupied by workers in the nearby oil fields.

Robert Bates and Andrew Bailard purchased land in La Conchita in hopes of finding oil in the area. (Andrew Bailard had purchased 500 acres (2.0 km^{2}) of land in Carpinteria in 1868). This enterprise was to fail financially. As noted in the memoirs of Edward Bates, from 1910 until the late 1920s the beach area of the Rincon was viewed as more of a liability than an asset. Unsuccessful drilling for water also began in earnest at this time.

Edward C. Ramelli, bought land that had a resort hotel called the Mussel Rock Inn and property in La Conchita at the water's edge in 1923. His brother Milton was a civil engineer and surveyor. He laid out the first nineteen homes and called it La Conchita del Mar. The following May, Milton Ramelli laid out 327 more lots on a dozen 40-foot-wide (12 m) streets on the uphill side of the railroad tracks. La Conchita del Mar was promoted as an affordable seaside paradise with lots available starting at $200, which included oil rights. It was called a "beach with a future." Milton Ramelli also subdivided the 66-lot community of Mussel Shoals in 1924 on land owned by the Hickey Brothers. Ten years later he also developed Solimar Beach on leased land.

=== 1927–1959 ===
On March 11, 1931, famed German film director F.W. Murnau suffered a severe head injury in a single-car accident on the highway near Rincon Beach. He was taken to a hospital in Santa Barbara where he died the next day.

Successful oil drilling off of Mussel Rock began in 1927. Oil workers leased rental property in La Conchita. A mild interest in beach property began to grow in the early 1930s. However, despite oil fields producing in Sea Cliff and elsewhere on the Rincon, no oil was discovered in La Conchita. The fresh water promised to all lots never materialized either.

For many years La Conchita remained a small and quiet community. Many people who had purchased property here initially built summer homes right on the beach, drawn to the serenity and the unspoiled beauty of the beach, ocean and the view.

The La Conchita Story project used oral histories and memories of a residents of the community from 1928 on. Eleanor Gallardo Ramey was born in La Conchita in 1928 in the house built by her father Joseph Gallardo a year earlier. The Gallardo homestead still stands on Sunland Avenue, which was then known as Ventura Avenue. Joseph Gallardo, a native of Mexico, worked for the railroad as a watchman and Eleanor has vivid memories, as well as photographs, of all the years she attended the Punta Gorda (one room) Schoolhouse in La Conchita. Pete Richardson came to La Conchita in 1928 when he was two years old. His father Harry Richardson was an oil worker who dug the first oil well in Mussel Shoals (then known as Mussel Rock). At that time, Richardson remembers his family as having the only "real house in La Conchita", an adobe, whose foundation can still be found just south of town. Dick Talaugon's father Federico Talaugon leased a large house from the Gaynor family on the site of the current Phillips oil storage facility. The family moved there in the winter of 1932 and were part of a growing Pacific Islander community working the farms and ranches of the major landowners of the region. Here Talaugon farmed lima beans and barley. Both Pete Richardson and Dick Talaugon attended Punta Gorda School, the one-room schoolhouse in La Conchita. The school was moved in the mid-1950s to Santa Clara Street in Ventura and used as a kindergarten. Prior to demolition of the building, part was salvaged and moved to its present location in La Conchita at 6746 Ojai Street. Remnants of the concrete foundation can still be found just west of town near the avocado orchard across from Carpinteria Street.

By 1930 there were a dozen or so families living in small cottages at the foot of the hill. Lima beans grew on either side of the community and the community sloped down to the shore broken only by the railroad tracks and the old Rincon Highway. For 25¢ per five-gallon jug, the Matilja Water Company delivered water to La Conchita residents. A reliable source of water came to the area with the construction of Casitas Dam that was completed in 1959.

In 1931 Rudy Scheidman and Frank Regamey purchased the Mussel Rock Inn on the beach side of the railroad track at Mussel Shoals. It once had a glass-enclosed dance floor over the water, eventually lost to the winter surf and attracted such Hollywood celebrities as Marie Dressler, Warner Oland and opera singer Lotte Lehmann. When the highway was widened to three lanes in 1935, the restaurant had to be moved to the beach at La Conchita and was renamed as Frank and Rudy's. It closed in 1942.

In 1949 the Highway was widened to four lanes with outer edges of the seawall protected by a riprap seawall of boulders weighing up to 10 short tons (9.1 tonnes) brought by rail from Riverside County.

In the early 1950s the La Conchita cottages on the beach were either relocated or demolished when the highway was widened after the state acquired additional property.

During the 1950s and 1960s La Conchita became a popular vacation destination for many families in the San Fernando Valley. Mobile homes and small beach cottages started popping up in the small lots, and as the town became more popular, larger custom homes.

In 1956-7, Richland Oil Company constructed an artificial island, now known as Rincon Island, for oil drilling off Mussel Shoals.

=== 1960–2005 ===
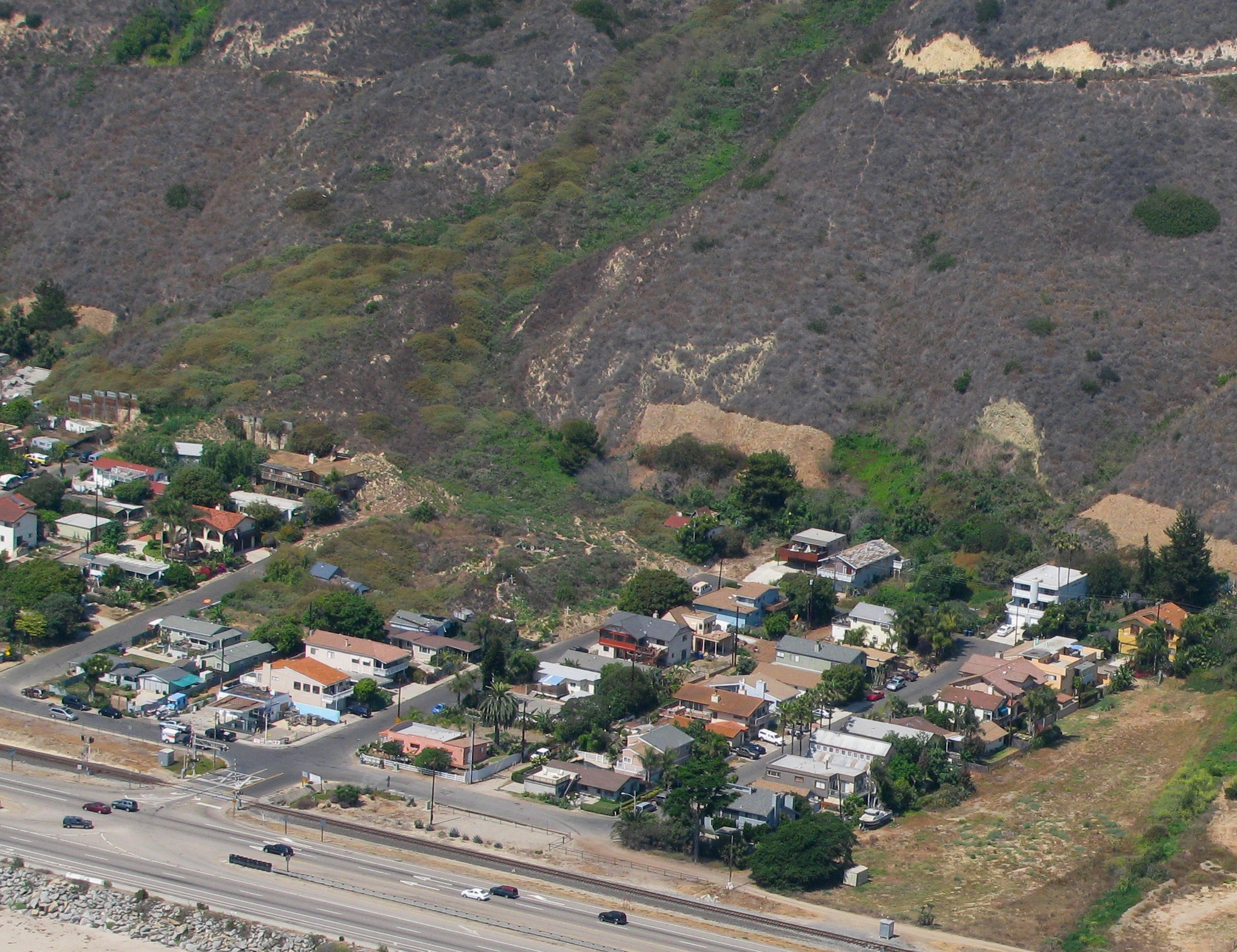
View of the main 2005 landslide, from the air, just offshore. Prior to 2005 the houses formed a straight line along the base of the hill.

1967- Phillips Petroleum Company proposed its processing plant on 15 acres (61,000 m^{2}) previously zoned for homes.

1971- Highway 101 completed

1975- La Conchita Ranch Co. started to farm the plateau, a marine terrace above the community, for citrus and avocado.

1985- Seaside Banana Gardens established in La Conchita

Until its forced closure in 1998, after the financial impact of the 1995 mudslide led to it losing its lease, the Seaside Banana Gardens operated by Doug Richardson (and his partner Paul Turner) were a leading attraction in La Conchita. The Gardens were featured in both national and international publications. Although it was widely assumed that bananas could not be commercially grown in California, the garden cultivated over 50 exotic varieties in the unusual microclimate of the area.

1986- Internationally recognized Artist Roger Brown moves to La Conchita.

Roger Brown (1941–1997) lived primarily in La Conchita from the late 1980s until his untimely death in 1997. The community and its environment inspired many of the artist's paintings during the last decade of his life. Brown was a member of the class-action lawsuit filed against La Conchita Ranch as a result of the 1995 mudslide, and some of his works depict the cataclysmic events of that day rendered in his signature style. His works are in major museums and private collections throughout the country. The artist's estate and collections are maintained at the Roger Brown Study Collection at the School of the Art Institute of Chicago.

1991- "A 1991 slide, far milder than the [March 1995 mudslide], prompted many homeowners to build safety precautions [such as retaining walls and mud-flow channels] against the mud."

1992- renowned Chicago architect Stanley Tigerman Architect, (b. 1930- ) completes the studio home of artist Roger Brown (1941–1997) on Ojai Street.

The pink adobe home has become a significant landmark in La Conchita. Brown had fought for more than two years to get the design of this studio through the Ventura County Planning Commission and even commemorated his frustrations with the Commission in a now famous painting.

1995- first major mudslide affecting the village of La Conchita.

2004- Roger Brown residence purchased by ER Nurse Bill Harbison. 1.5 months later the 2005 landslide occurred, during which he was responsible for two live rescues, for which he was awarded the Medal of Valor by the Ventura County Fire Department and the State of California.

=== 2005–present ===
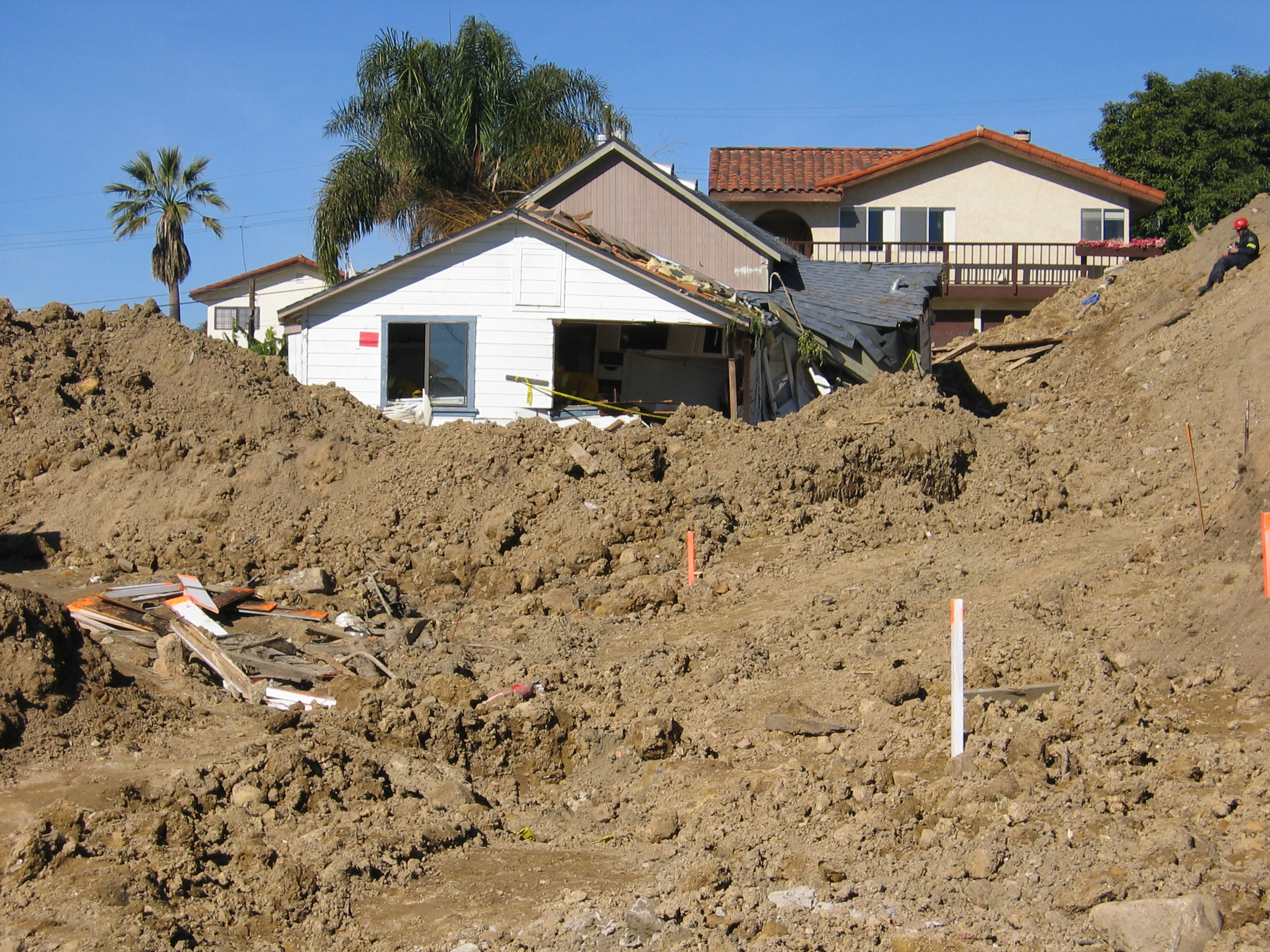
Damaged buildings are surrounded by mud in La Conchita. FEMA photo, 01-15-2005.

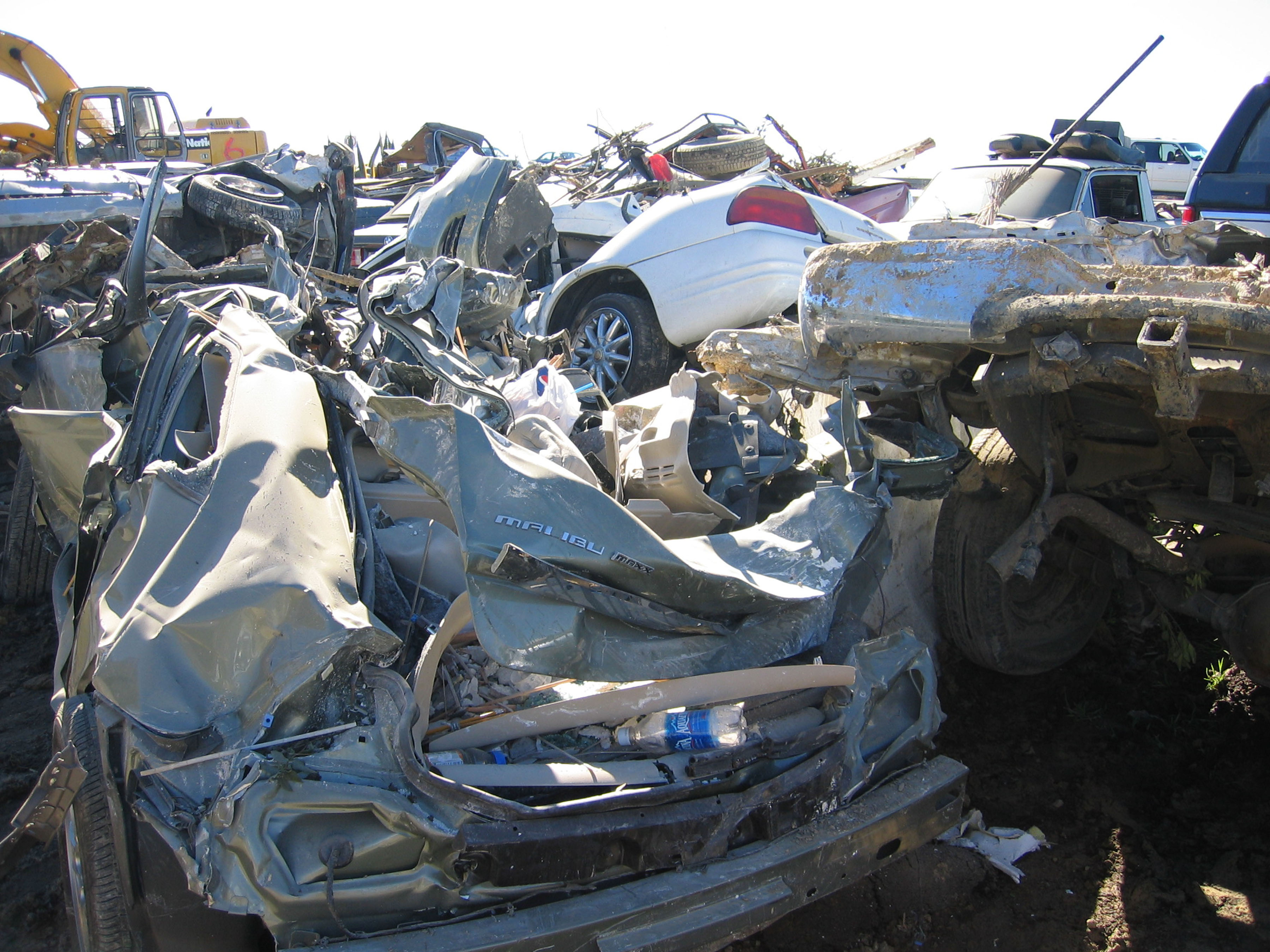
Damaged and destroyed vehicles line the side of the road in La Conchita. FEMA photo, 01-15-2005.

2005- On January 10, 2005, the 2005 La Conchita Landslide took the lives of ten La Conchita residents.

On Jan. 15, 2005 the residents formed the La Conchita Community Organization (LCCO). The LCCO has worked with Local, State and the Federal Government officials to resolve the landslide situation that has affected the community since 1995. In March 2006 Governor Schwarzenegger announced the allocation of $667,000 for a "comprehensive study to examine how to ensure the safety of the beachside community." The contract to the consulting firm was signed in April 2007 and a "draft" report was received at the beginning of 2009.

In 2008 plaintiffs representing family members of those killed and residents who lost property in the 2005 La Conchita mudslide successfully settled a lawsuit filed against the La Conchita Ranch. The Ranch was found partly negligent and settled. The assets of the ranch plus a cash settlement were turned over to the plaintiffs. (See:"Firm to Settle Suit Over Deadly La Conchita Slide "Los Angeles Times, California Section, Sept.9, 2008) among other California papers. The ranch has since been purchased and La Conchita residents are working with the new owners to coordinate the efforts for the future safety of all residents.

The plaintiffs also sued the County of Ventura for damages arising out on the 2005 landslide. Plaintiffs claimed that the wall that the County built at the base of the landslide caused or contributed to their damages. At trial, the County prevailed against the plaintiffs on all claims. Plaintiffs appealed, but the Court of Appeal ruled in favor of the County. It found that warnings the County gave of the dangers of living in La Conchita were "sufficient to advise any reasonable person to stay away from La Conchita..."

As of 2015, La Conchita remains an active community of about 300 residents, despite warnings of a continuing risk of further slides. Proposals have been made to improve the safety of the area by grading the hill, at an estimated cost of $50 million, as well as an alternative proposal for the government to buy up and empty the town through eminent domain, but neither alternative has gone forward.

== Geography ==
The entire town consists of two streets parallel to the shore, with ten short perpendicular streets, ending at the base of Rincon Mountain.

La Conchita is on a southwesterly-facing portion of the coast. The area is called "Punta" on USGS topographic maps. It is between Rincon Point to the northwest and Mussel Shoals to the southeast; 659 m (2,162 ft) Rincon Mountain rises sharply to the northeast. The nearest incorporated town is Carpinteria, about five miles (8.0 km) to the northwest.

=== Landslides ===
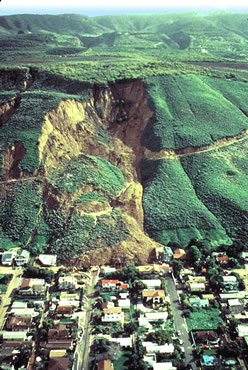
USGS Image of debris flow from 1995 Landslide

The village of La Conchita is along a portion of the coast prone to mudslides, and sits beneath a geologically unstable formation. In 1909, a devastating mudslide occurred approximately one-half mile north of the town.

Sandwiched between a steep, unstable hillside (with the La Conchita Ranch Company situated on the plateau directly over the community), and the Pacific Ocean, La Conchita has been the site of recent major mudslides:

- On March 4, 1995 at 2:03pm, a mudslide buried or damaged seven homes with no injuries. After the main failure, the weather forecast predicted more rain for the following week.
- On March 10, 1995, a debris flow occurred in the canyon west of the March 4 slide, damaging four or five more residences and a banana plantation.
- On January 10, 2005 at 12:30pm, a massive mudslide buried four blocks of the town in over 30 feet (9.1 m) of earth. Ten people were killed by the slide and 14 were injured. The slide closed Highway 101 in both directions. Of the 166 homes in the community, fifteen were destroyed and sixteen more were tagged by the county as uninhabitable.

La Conchita Ranch Co. was sued by those affected by the 2005 landslide. A settlement was reached, giving the plaintiffs the company's assets and $5 million.
