= Santa Barbara, California =

City in California, United States

- City
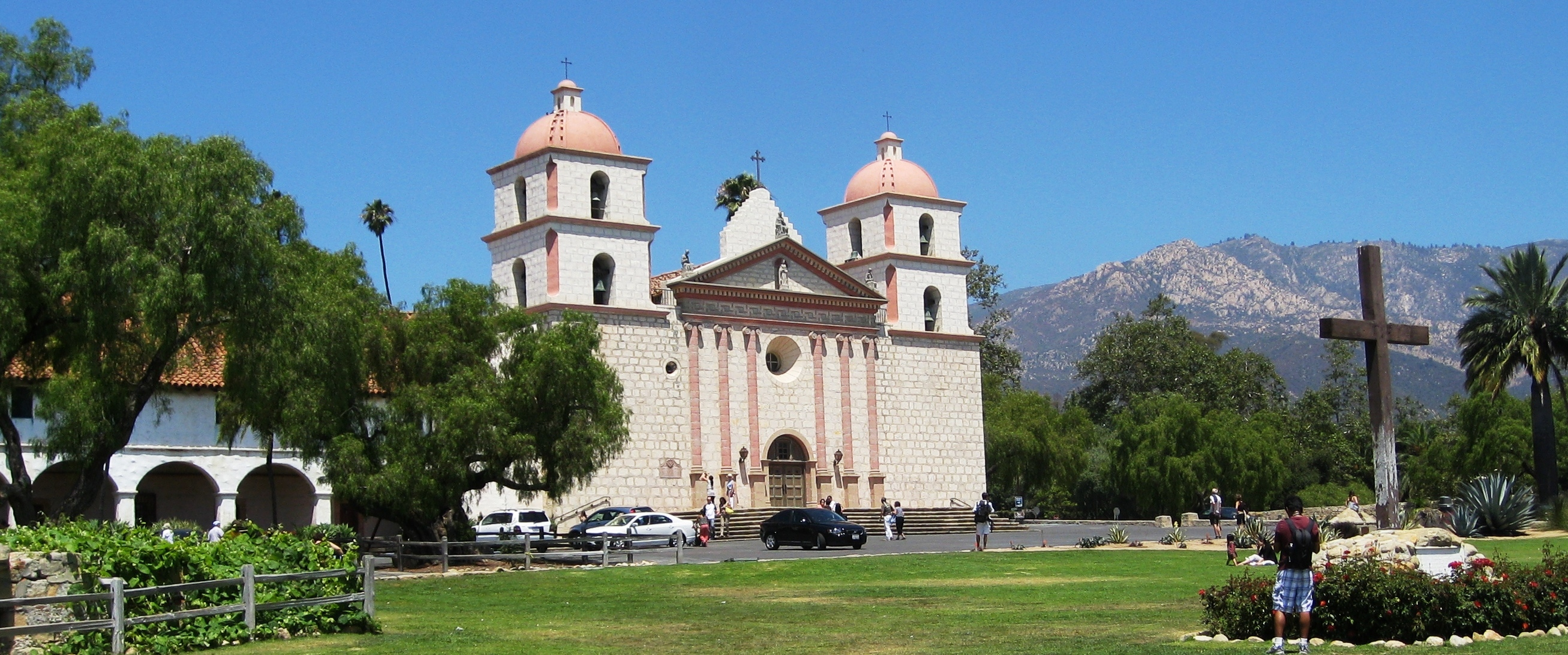
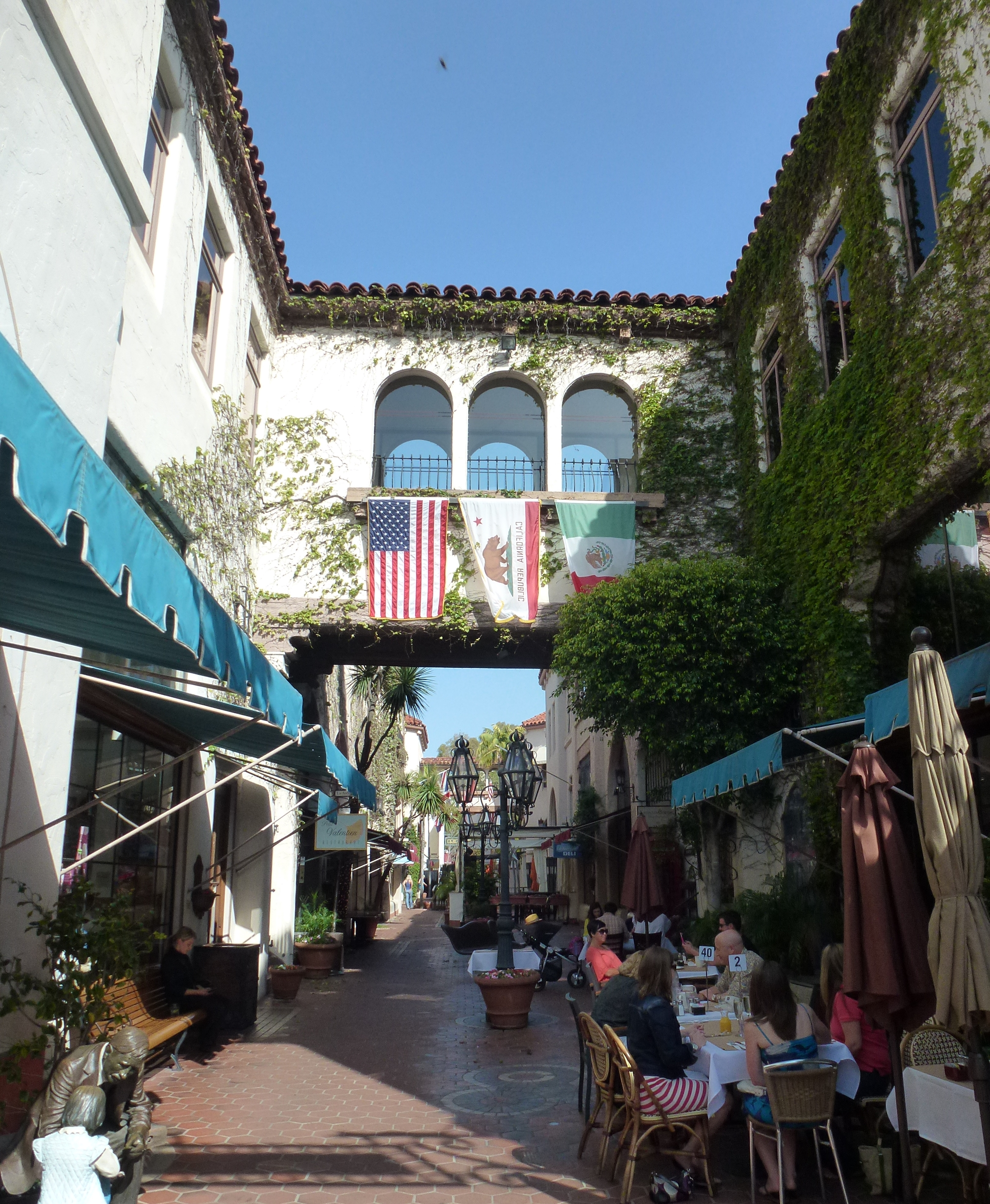
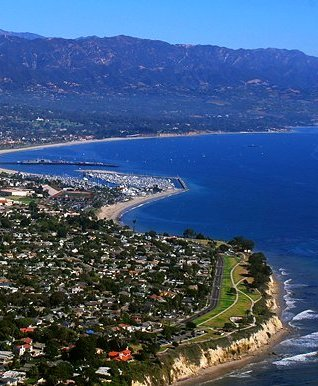
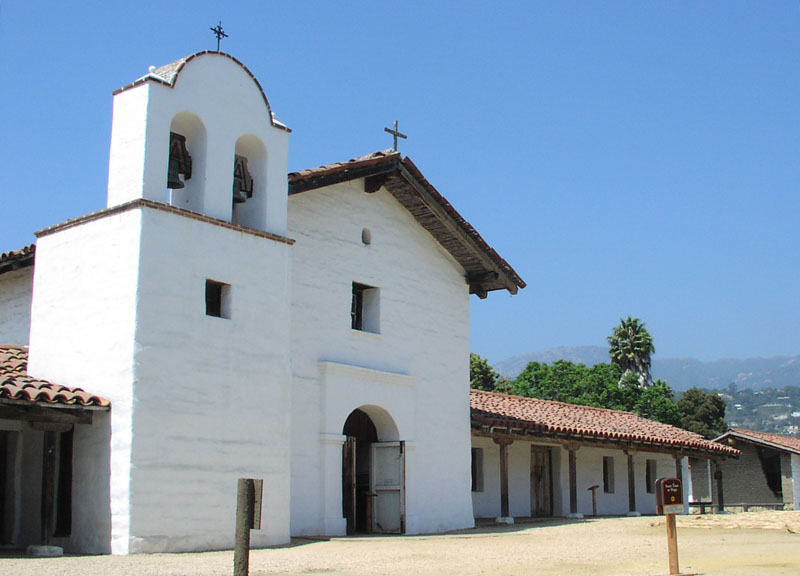
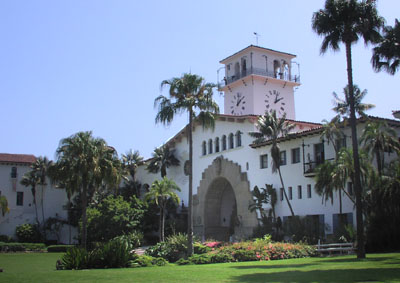
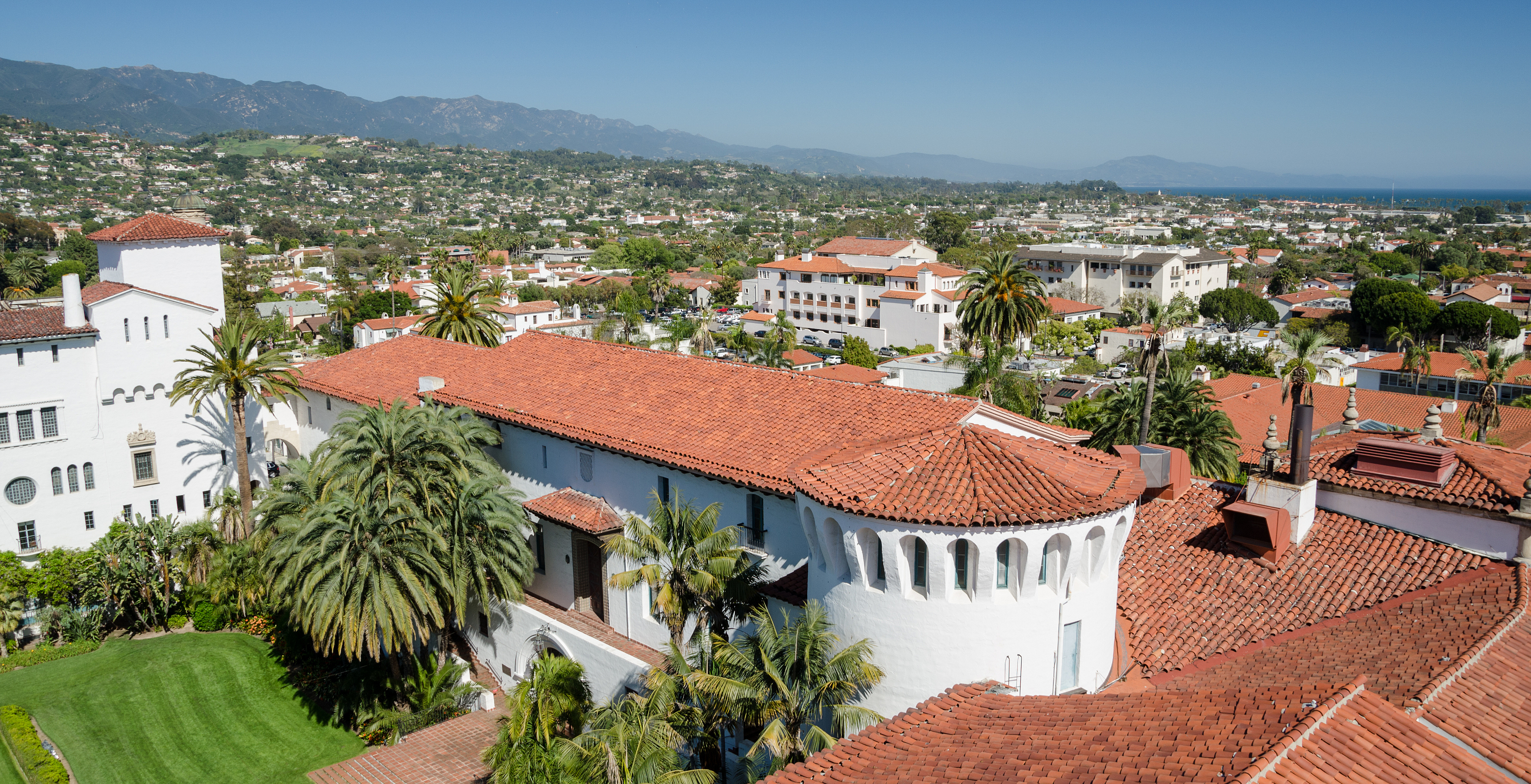
- Clockwise: Mission Santa Barbara; California Riviera; Santa Barbara County Courthouse; View of Downtown; Presidio of Santa Barbara; Downtown Santa Barbara

- Flag Seal
- Nickname: The American Riviera
- Interactive map of Santa Barbara, California
- Location within California Location within the United States
- Coordinates: 34°25′N 119°42′W
- Country: United States
- State: California
- County: Santa Barbara
- Incorporated: April 9, 1850
- Named for: Saint Barbara

Government
  - Type: Council–manager
  - Mayor: Randy Rowse
  - State Senator: Monique Limón (D)
  - CA Assembly: Gregg Hart (D)
  - U.S. Rep.: Salud Carbajal (D)

Area
  - City: 42.00 sq mi (108.79 km^{2})
  - Land: 19.51 sq mi (50.52 km^{2})
  - Water: 22.49 sq mi (58.26 km^{2}) 53.56%
- Elevation: 49 ft (15 m)

Population (2020)
  - City: 88,665
  - Rank: 97th in California
  - Density: 4,546.92/sq mi (1,755.58/km^{2})
  - Urban: 202,197 (US: 190th)
  - Urban density: 3,688.9/sq mi (1,424.3/km^{2})
  - Metro: 446,475 (US: 123rd)
- Time zone: UTC−08:00 (PST)
  - Summer (DST): UTC−07:00 (PDT)
- ZIP Codes: 93101–93103, 93105–93111, 93116–93118, 93120–93121, 93130, 93140, 93150, 93160, 93190, 93199
- Area code: 805
- FIPS code: 06-69070
- GNIS feature IDs: 1661401, 2411815
- Website: santabarbaraca.gov

Santa Barbara (Spanish: Santa Bárbara, meaning 'Saint Barbara') is a coastal city in Santa Barbara County, California, United States, of which it is also the county seat. Situated on a southward-facing section of coastline, the longest such section on the West Coast of the United States excepting Alaska, the city lies between the steeply rising Santa Ynez Mountains and the Pacific Ocean. Santa Barbara's climate is often described as Mediterranean, and the city has been dubbed "The American Riviera". As of the 2020 census, Santa Barbara had a population of 88,665.

In addition to being a popular tourist and resort destination, the city has a diverse economy that includes a large service sector, education, technology, health care, finance and local government. In 2004, the service sector accounted for 35% of local employment. In 2024, the biggest employer in Santa Barbara County was government, followed by private education and healthcare, then leisure and hospitality. Together, these accounted for 50.5% of all employment.

Area institutions of higher learning include the University of California, Santa Barbara, Santa Barbara City College, Westmont College, The Colleges of Law, and Antioch University Santa Barbara.

The city is served by Santa Barbara Municipal Airport and train service is provided by Amtrak, which operates two service lines with stops in Santa Barbara: the Pacific Surfliner, which runs from San Diego to San Luis Obispo, and the Coast Starlight, which runs from Los Angeles to Seattle. The Santa Barbara area is connected via U.S. Highway 101 to Los Angeles 100 mi (160 km) to the southeast and San Francisco 325 mi (525 km) to the northwest.

Behind the city, in and beyond the Santa Ynez Mountains, is the Los Padres National Forest, which contains several remote wilderness areas. Channel Islands National Park and Channel Islands National Marine Sanctuary are located approximately 20 miles (30 km) offshore.

== History ==
Historical affiliations

Spanish Empire 1769–1821
First Mexican Empire 1821–1823
(Mexico) United Mexican States 1823–1848
United States 1848–present

Evidence of human habitation of the area begins at least 13,000 years ago. Evidence for a Paleoindian presence includes a fluted Clovis-like point found in the 1980s along the western Santa Barbara County coast, as well as the remains of Arlington Springs Man, found on Santa Rosa Island in the 1960s. At least 25,000 Chumash natives lived in the region prior to Spanish contact. Five Chumash villages flourished in the area. The present-day area of Santa Barbara City College was the village of Mispu; the site of the Los Baños pool (along west beach) was the village of Syukhtun, chief Yanonalit's large village located between Bath and Chapala streets; Amolomol was at the mouth of Mission Creek; and Swetete, above the bird refuge.

=== Spanish era ===
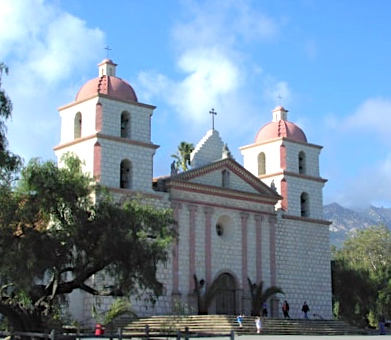
Mission Santa Barbara, known as "the Queen of the Missions", was founded by the Spanish in 1786.

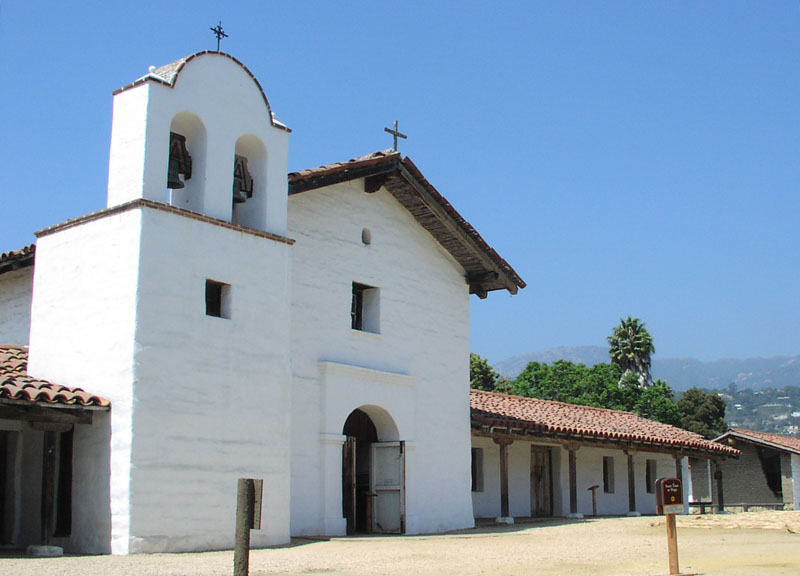
Presidio of Santa Barbara

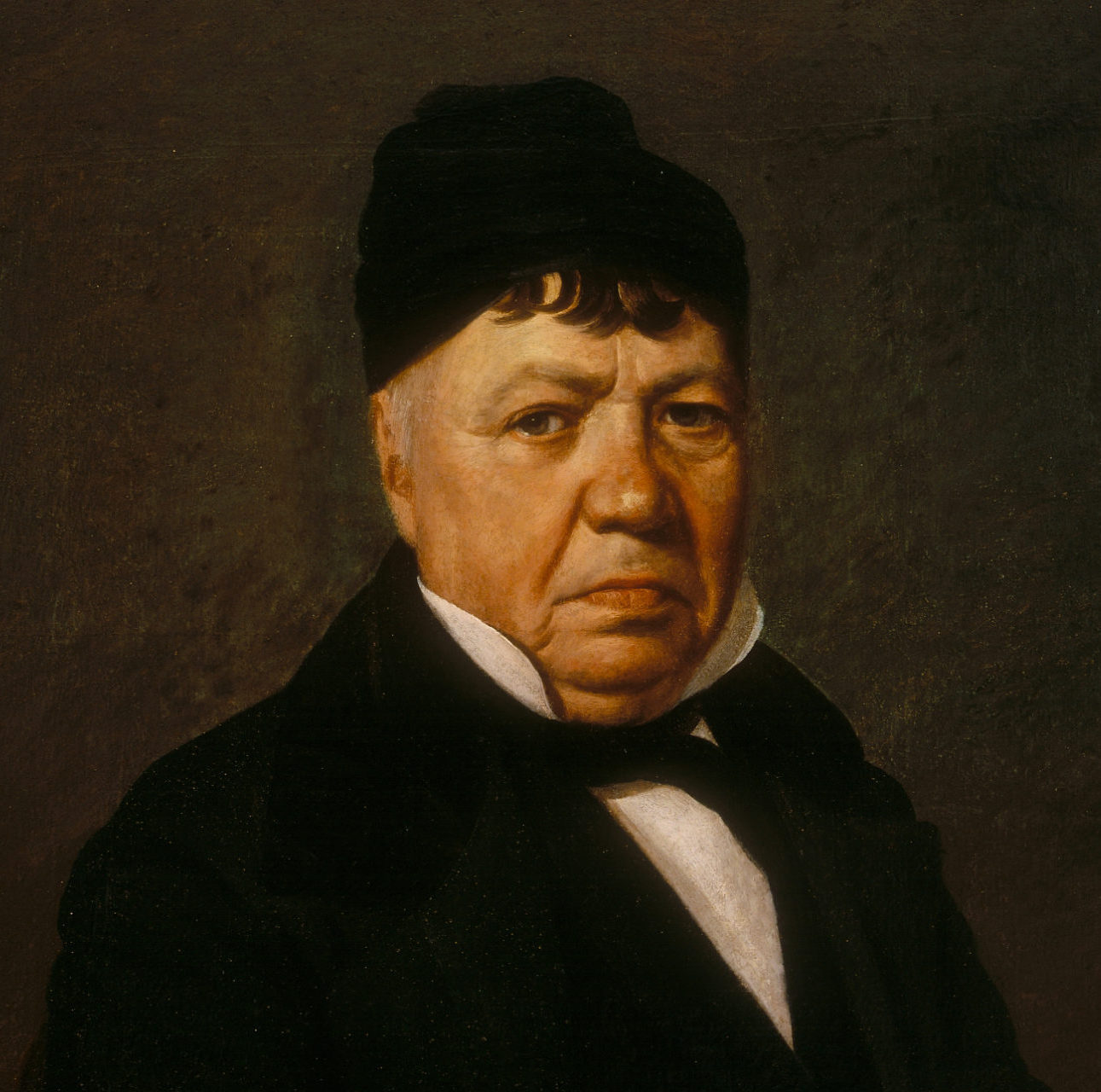
Don José de la Guerra y Noriega served as Commandant of the Presidio of Santa Barbara and founded the Guerra family of California, a prominent Californio family which produced numerous Mayors of Santa Barbara, California Senators, and more.

The explorer Juan Rodríguez Cabrillo, sailing for the King of Spain, departed from the western coast of the Viceroyalty of New Spain (now modern Mexico) on orders from the viceroy in Mexico City and sailed up through what is now called the Santa Barbara Channel in 1542, anchoring briefly in the area. In 1602, Spanish maritime explorer Sebastián Vizcaíno gave the name "Santa Barbara" to the channel and also to one of the Channel Islands.

A land expedition led by Gaspar de Portolà visited around 1769, and Franciscan missionary Juan Crespi, who accompanied the expedition, named a large native town "Laguna de la Concepción". Cabrillo's earlier name, however, is the one that has survived.

The first permanent European residents were Spanish missionaries and soldiers under Felipe de Neve, who arrived in 1782 and constructed the Presidio. They were sent to both secure the Spanish claim to the region and to convert the indigenous peoples to Catholicism. Many of the Spaniards brought their families with them, and those formed the nucleus of the small town – at first just a cluster of adobes – that surrounded the Presidio of Santa Barbara. The Santa Barbara Mission was established on the Feast of Saint Barbara, December 4, 1786. It was the tenth of the California Missions to be founded by the Spanish Franciscans. It was dedicated by Padre Fermín Lasuén, who succeeded Padre Junipero Serra as the second president and founder of the California Franciscan Mission Chain. The Chumash laborers built a connection between the canyon creek and the Santa Barbara Mission water system through the use of a dam and an aqueduct. During the following decades, many of the natives died of diseases such as smallpox, against which they had no natural immunity.

The most dramatic event of the Spanish period was the powerful 1812 earthquake, and tsunami, with an estimated magnitude of 7.1, which destroyed the Mission as well as the rest of the town; water reached as high as present-day Anapamu Street, and carried a ship half a mile up Refugio Canyon. The Mission was rebuilt by 1820 after the earthquake. Following the earthquake, the Mission fathers chose to rebuild in a grander manner, and it is this construction that survives to the present day, the best-preserved of the California Missions, and still functioning as an active church by the Franciscans. After the Mexican government secularized the missions in the 1830s, the baptismal, marriage, and burial records of other missions were transferred to Santa Barbara, and are now found in the Santa Barbara Mission Archive-Library.

The Spanish period ended in 1821 with the conclusion of the Mexican War of Independence, which terminated 300 years of Spanish colonial rule in the Viceroyalty of New Spain and 52 years in California itself, transferred control to the newly independent Mexican government.

Santa Barbara street names reflect the influence of the Spanish period. The names de le Guerra and Carrillo come from the Guerra family of California and Carrillo family of California, respectively. They were instrumental in building up the town, so they were honored by having streets named after them.

=== Mexican era ===
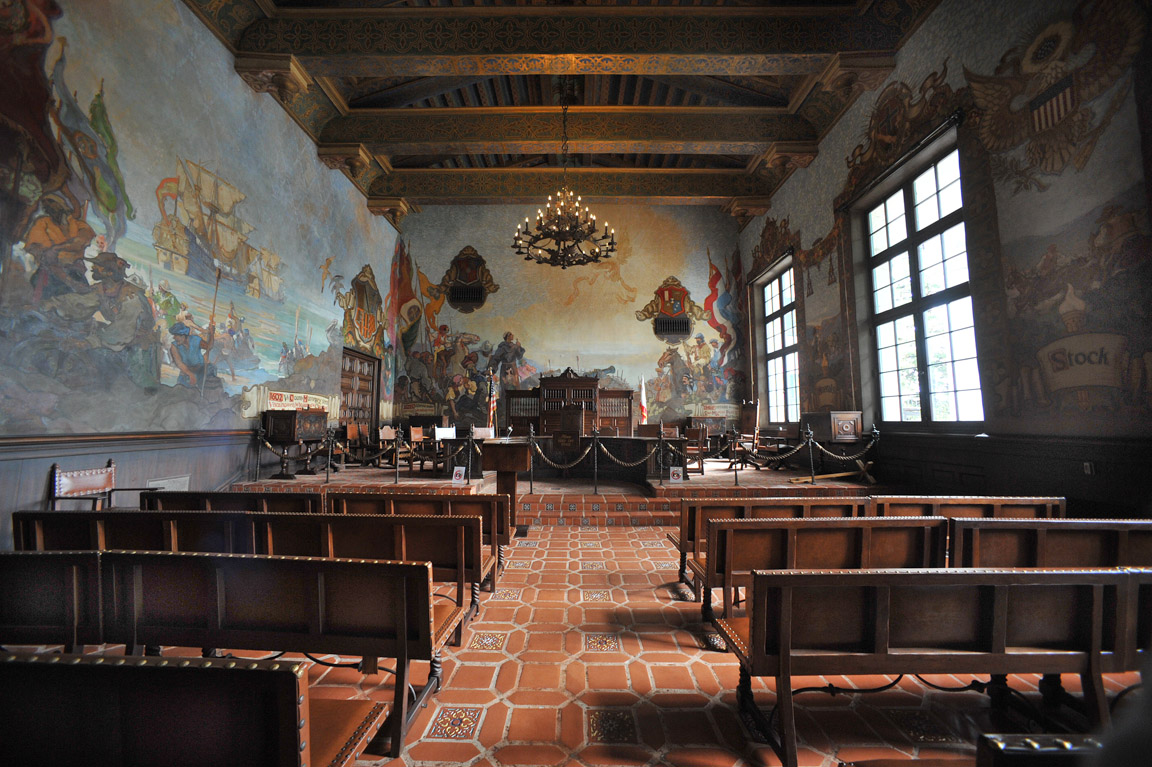
Mural Room (formerly Board of Supervisors' Hearing Room) within the Santa Barbara County Courthouse. Wall murals depict the history of Santa Barbara. The room is used occasionally as a courtroom.

After the forced secularization of the Missions in 1833, successive Mexican Governors distributed the large land tracts formerly held by the Franciscan Order to various families in order to reward service or build alliances. These land grants to local notable families mark the beginning of the "Rancho Period" in California and Santa Barbara history. Fernando Tico was one of the first settlers who received land grants for the local area. Fernando led the Native Americans against the Argentinian pirates in the 1800s. The population remained sparse, with enormous cattle operations run by wealthy families. It was during this period that Richard Henry Dana Jr. first visited Santa Barbara and wrote about the culture and people of Santa Barbara in his 1840 book Two Years Before the Mast.

Santa Barbara fell bloodlessly to a battalion of American soldiers under John C. Frémont on December 27, 1846, during the Mexican–American War, and after the Treaty of Guadalupe Hidalgo in 1848 it became part of the expanding United States.

=== Early United States era ===
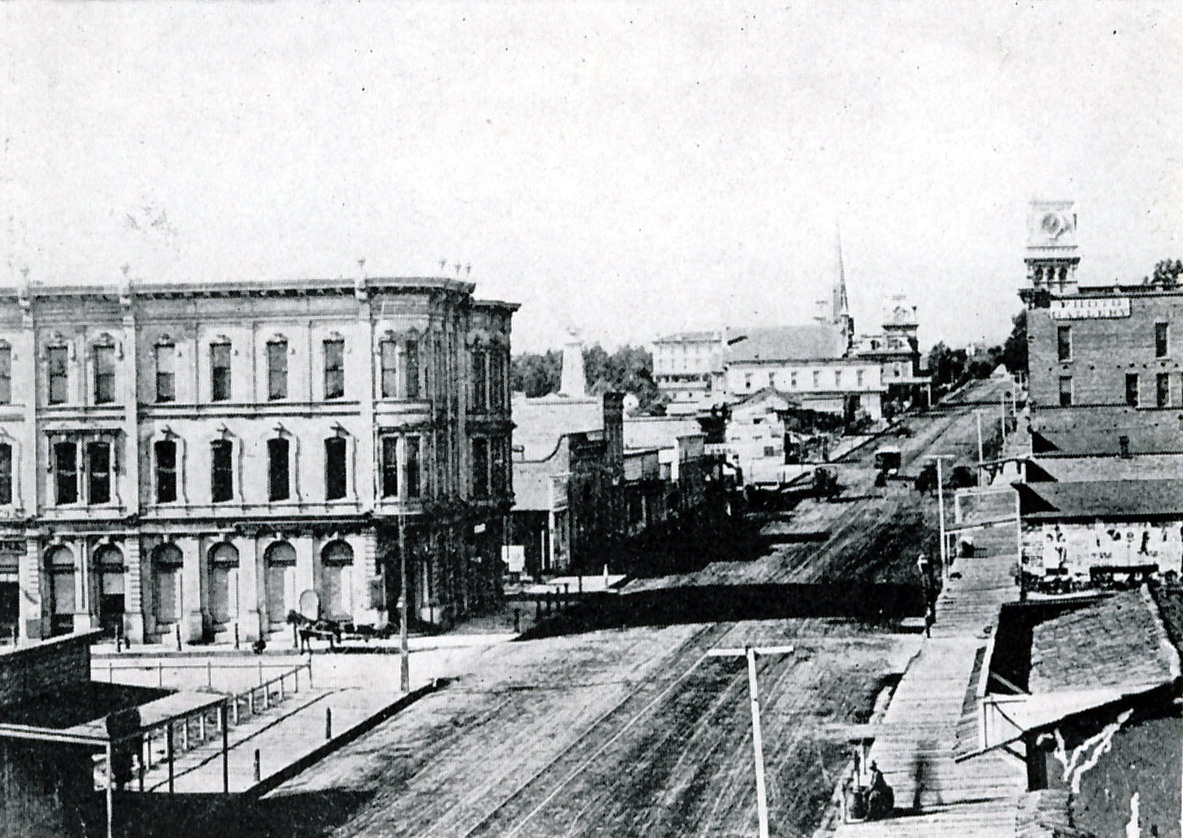
State Street Santa Barbara, California in the 1880s. A view looking north from Canon Perdido Street.

Change came quickly in Santa Barbara following the American Conquest of California. The population doubled between 1850 and 1860. In 1851, land surveyor Salisbury Haley designed the street grid, famously botching the block measurements, misaligning the streets, thereby creating doglegs at certain intersections. Wood construction replaced adobe as American settlers moved in; during the Gold Rush years and following, the town became a haven for bandits and gamblers, and a dangerous and lawless place. Charismatic gambler and highwayman Jack Powers had virtual control of the town in the early 1850s, until driven out by a posse organized in San Luis Obispo. English gradually supplanted Spanish as the language of daily life, becoming the language of official record in 1870. The first newspaper, the Santa Barbara Gazette, was founded in 1855.

While the Civil War had little effect on Santa Barbara, the disastrous drought of 1863 ended the Rancho Period, as most of the cattle died and ranchos were broken up and sold. Mortimer Cook, a wealthy entrepreneur, arrived in 1871 and opened the city's first bank. Cook later served two terms as mayor. Cook founded the first National Gold Bank of Santa Barbara in 1873. The building of Stearns Wharf in 1872 enhanced Santa Barbara's commercial and tourist accessibility; previously goods and visitors had to transfer from steamboats to smaller craft to row ashore. During the 1870s, writer Charles Nordhoff promoted the town as a health resort and destination for well-to-do travelers from other parts of the U.S.; many of them came, and many stayed. The luxurious Arlington Hotel dated from this period. In 1887 the railroad finally went through to Los Angeles, and in 1901 to San Francisco: Santa Barbara was now easily accessible by land and by sea, and subsequent development was brisk. Santa Barbara had a system of street railways that operated from 1875 through 1929. Begun as a single mule-drawn line from the waterfront pier to the Arlington Hotel, over the decades it was incrementally expanded, later electrified, and operated until its closure in June 1929.

Peter J. Barber, an architect, designed many Late Victorian style residences and served twice as mayor, in 1880 and again in 1890. A year after Barber's term as mayor, President Benjamin Harrison became the first of five presidents to visit Santa Barbara.

=== Early 20th century to World War II ===
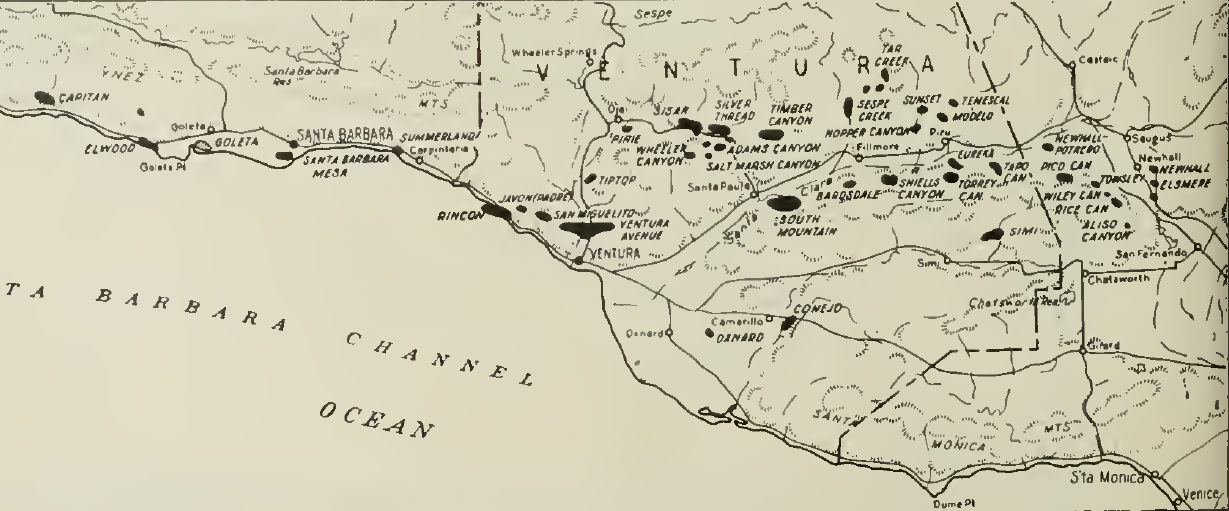
A map of Santa Barbara Oil and Gas Fields

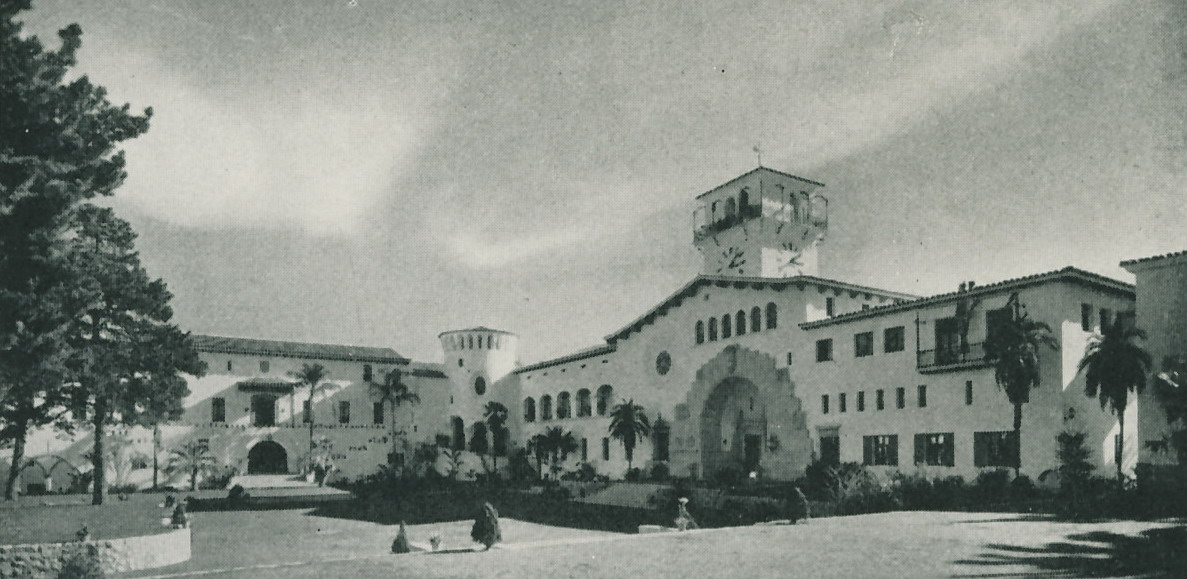
The new Santa Barbara County Courthouse was dedicated on August 14, 1929.

Just before the turn of the 20th century, oil was discovered at the Summerland Oil Field, and the region along the beach east of Santa Barbara sprouted numerous oil derricks and piers for drilling offshore. This was the first offshore oil development in the world; oil drilling offshore would become a contentious practice in the Santa Barbara area, which continues to the present day.

Santa Barbara housed the world's largest movie studio during the era of silent film. Flying A Studios, a division of the American Film Manufacturing Company, operated on two city blocks centered at State and Mission between 1910 and 1922, with the industry shutting down locally and moving to Hollywood once it outgrew the area, needing the resources of a larger city. Flying A and the other smaller local studios produced approximately 1,200 films during their tenure in Santa Barbara, of which approximately 100 survive.

During this period, the Loughead Aircraft Company was established on lower State Street, and regularly tested seaplanes off of East Beach. This was the genesis of what would later become Lockheed.

The magnitude 6.3 earthquake of June 29, 1925, the first destructive earthquake in California since the 1906 San Francisco quake, damaged much of downtown Santa Barbara and killed 13 people. The earthquake caused infrastructure to collapse including the Sheffield Dam. The low death toll is attributed to the early hour (6:44 a.m., before most people were out on the streets, vulnerable to falling masonry). While this quake, like the one in 1812, was centered in the Santa Barbara Channel, it caused no tsunami. It came at an opportune time for rebuilding, since a movement for architectural reform and unification around a Spanish Colonial style was already underway. Many of the city's famous buildings rose as part of the rebuilding process, including the Santa Barbara County Courthouse, sometimes praised as the "most beautiful public building in the United States". In 1907 in northern Santa Barbara county a horrific train accident claimed the lives of 37, the exact cause of which is still unknown. It is still the deadliest disaster in the Santa Barbara history.

During World War II, Santa Barbara was home to Marine Corps Air Station Santa Barbara, and Naval Reserve Center Santa Barbara at the harbor. Up the coast, west of the city, was the Army's Camp Cooke (the present-day Vandenberg Space Force Base). In the city, Hoff General Hospital treated servicemen wounded in the Pacific Theatre. On February 23, 1942, not long after the outbreak of war in the Pacific, the Japanese submarine I-17 surfaced offshore and lobbed 16 shells at the Ellwood Oil Field, about 10 miles (15 km) west of Santa Barbara, in the first shelling attack by an enemy power on the continental U.S. since the bombardment of Orleans in World War I. Although the shelling was inaccurate and only caused about $500 damage to a catwalk, panic was immediate. Many Santa Barbara residents fled, and land values plummeted to historic lows.

=== After World War II ===
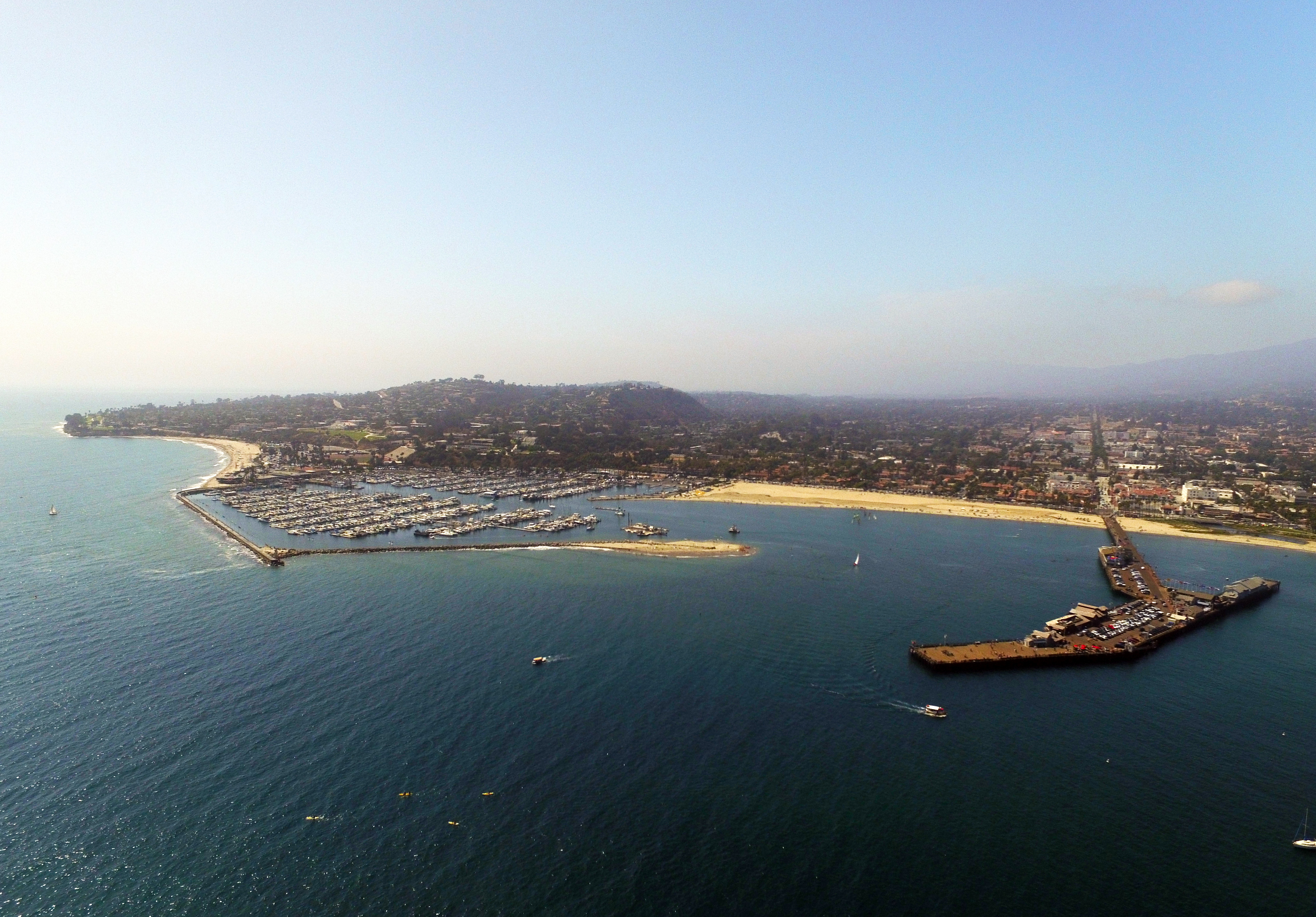
Aerial view of Santa Barbara Harbor and Stearns Wharf

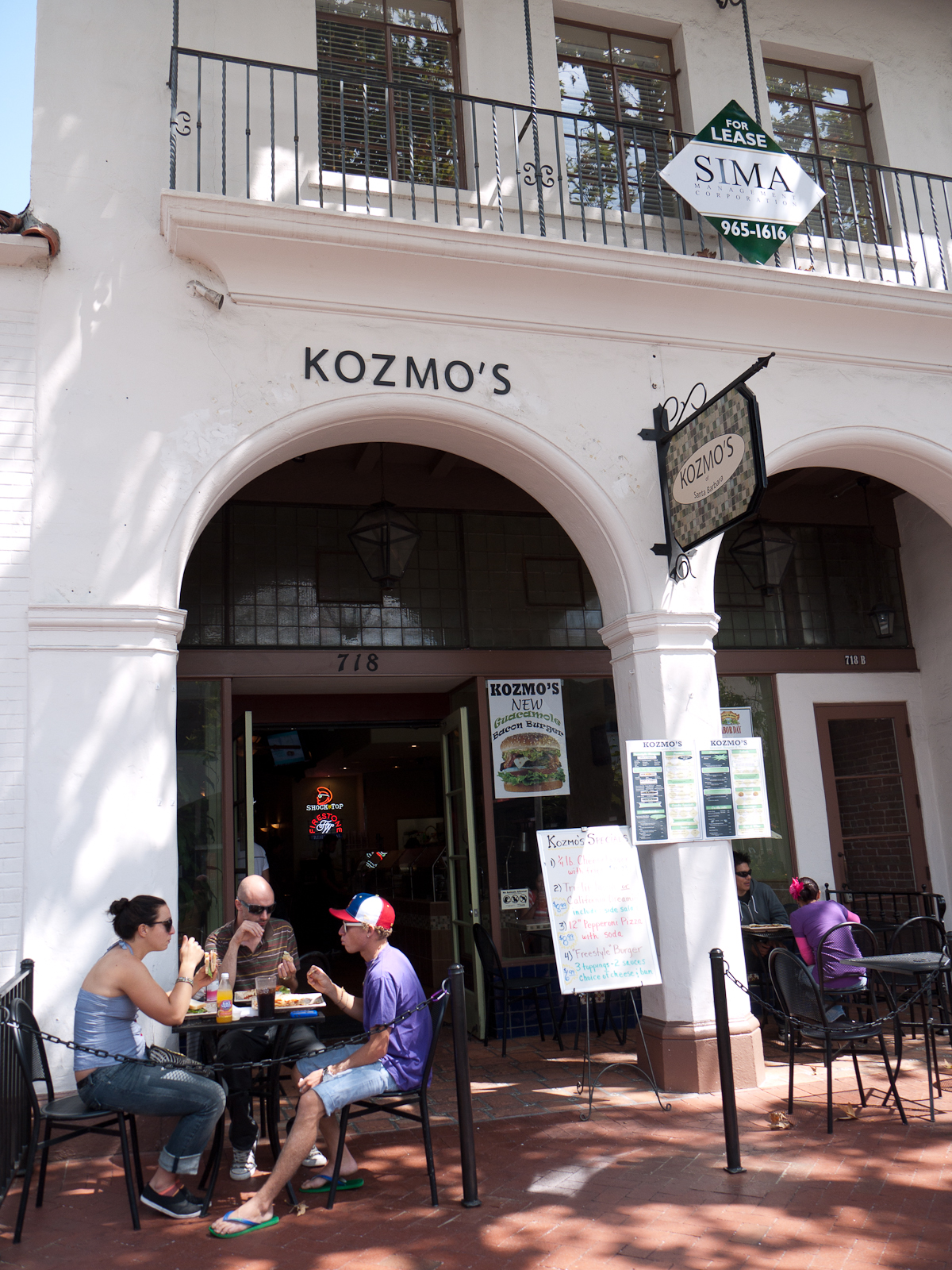
State Street, Santa Barbara

After the war many of the servicemen who had seen Santa Barbara returned to stay. The population surged by 10,000 people between the end of the war and 1950. This burst of growth had dramatic consequences for the local economy and infrastructure. Highway 101 was built through town during this period, and newly built Lake Cachuma began supplying water via a tunnel dug through the mountains between 1950 and 1956.

Local relations with the oil industry gradually soured through the period. Production at Summerland had ended, Elwood was winding down, and to find new fields oil companies carried out seismic exploration of the Channel using explosives, a controversial practice that local fishermen claimed harmed their catch. The culminating disaster, and one of the formative events in the modern environmental movement, was the blowout at Union Oil's Platform A on the Dos Cuadras Field, about eight miles (13 km) southeast of Santa Barbara in the Santa Barbara Channel, on January 28, 1969. Approximately 100,000 barrels (16,000 m^{3}) of oil surged out of a huge undersea break, fouling hundreds of square miles of ocean and all the coastline from Ventura to Goleta, as well north facing beaches on the Channel Islands. Two legislative consequences of the spill in the next year were the passages of the California Environmental Quality Act (CEQA) and the National Environmental Policy Act (NEPA); locally, outraged citizens formed GOO (Get Oil Out).

Santa Barbara's business community strove to attract development until the surge in the managed growth movement in the 1970s. Many "clean" industries, especially aerospace firms such as Raytheon and Delco Electronics, moved to town in the 1950s and 1960s, bringing employees from other parts of the U.S. UCSB itself became a major employer. In 1975, the city reduced density in multiple zones to provide for a built-out population of approximately 85,000, a number that fit within the city's resources of such as water supply and traffic capacity.

When voters approved connection to State water supplies in 1991, parts of the city, especially outlying areas, resumed growth, but more slowly than during the boom period of the 1950s and 1960s. While the slower growth preserved the quality of life for most residents and prevented the urban sprawl notorious in the Los Angeles basin, housing in the Santa Barbara area was in short supply, and prices soared: in 2006, only six percent of residents could afford a median-value house. As a result, many people who work in Santa Barbara commute from adjacent, more affordable areas, such as Santa Maria, Lompoc, and Ventura. The resultant traffic on incoming arteries, in particular the stretch of Highway 101 between Ventura and Santa Barbara, is another problem being addressed by long-range planners.

==== Notable wildfires ====
Since the middle of the twentieth century, several destructive fires have affected Santa Barbara: the 1964 Coyote Fire, which burned 67,000 acres (270 km^{2}) of backcountry along with 106 homes; the smaller, but quickly moving, Sycamore Fire in 1977, which burned 200 homes; the disastrous 1990 Painted Cave Fire, which incinerated over 500 homes in only several hours, during an intense Sundowner wind event; the November 2008 Tea Fire, which destroyed 210 homes in the foothills of Santa Barbara and Montecito; and the 2009 Jesusita Fire that burned 8,733 acres (35.34 km^{2}) and destroyed 160 homes above the San Roque region of Santa Barbara.

The Thomas Fire burned from its origins in Santa Paula 60 miles (100 km) to the east of Santa Barbara and consumed 281,893 acres (1,140.78 km^{2}) in Santa Barbara and Ventura counties, most of which consisted of rural land and wilderness areas. The fire started on December 4, 2017, and was 100% contained by January 12, 2018. 1,050 structures were lost in the Thomas Fire, mostly east of Santa Barbara in Ventura County. The Thomas Fire has been the largest Santa Barbara County fire (in damage, not size) ever recorded to date.

== Geography ==
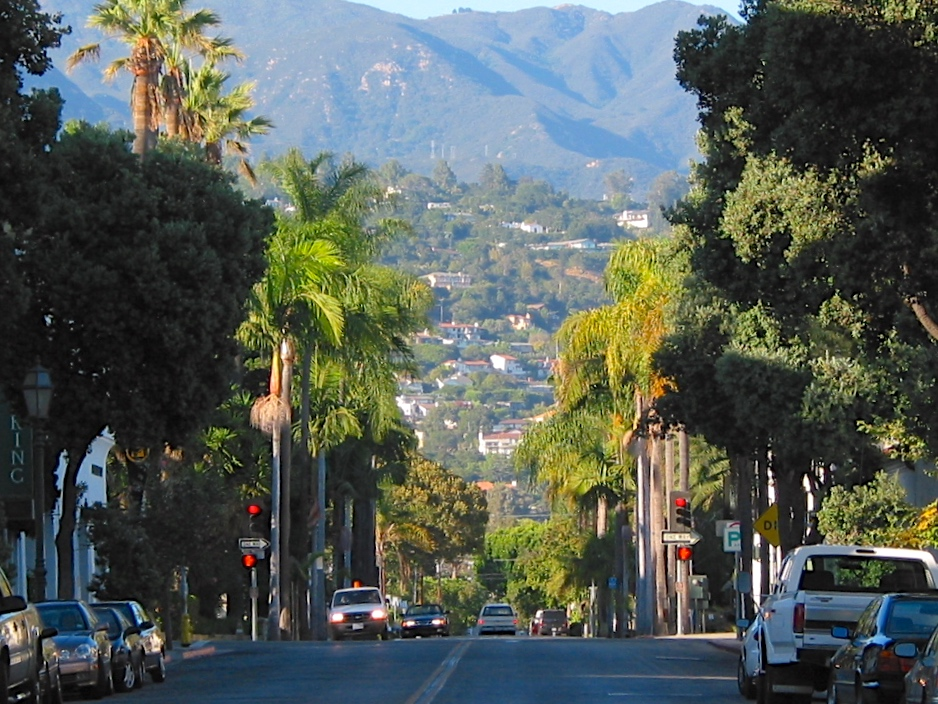
Looking north from a Santa Barbara street toward "the Riviera" and the Santa Ynez Mountains beyond

Santa Barbara is located about 90 miles (145 km) west-northwest of Los Angeles, along the Pacific coast. This stretch of coast along southern Santa Barbara County is sometimes referred to as "The American Riviera", presumably because its geography and climate are similar to those of areas along the northern Mediterranean Sea coast (especially in southern France) known as the Riviera. The Santa Ynez Mountains, an east–west trending range, rise dramatically behind the city, with several peaks exceeding 4,000 feet (1,200 m). Covered with chaparral, oaks and sandstone outcrops, they make a scenic backdrop to the town. Sometimes, perhaps once every three years, snow falls on the mountains, but it rarely stays for more than a few hours. Nearer to town, directly east and adjacent to Mission Santa Barbara, is an east–west ridge known locally as "the Riviera", traversed by a road called "Alameda Padre Serra" (shortened APS, which translates to "Father Serra's pathway").

According to the United States Census Bureau, the city has a total area of 42.0 square miles (108.8 km^{2}), of which 19.5 square miles (51 km^{2}) of it is land and 22.5 square miles (58 km^{2}) of it, or 53.56%, is water. The high official figures for water are due to the extension of the city limit into the ocean, including a strip of city reaching out into the sea and inland again to keep the Santa Barbara Airport (SBA) within the city boundary.

== Climate ==
Santa Barbara experiences a warm summer Mediterranean climate (Köppen: Csb, Trewartha: Csbl) characteristic of coastal California. Santa Barbara's weather was ranked number 1 in the United States in 2023–2024 by U.S. News & World Report. Because the city lies along the ocean and parallel to the predominant westerly winds, sideshore and light onshore breezes moderate temperatures resulting in warmer winters and cooler summers compared with places farther inland.

In the winter, storms reach California, some of which bring heavy rainfall but the rain shadow effect of the coastal mountains can at times moderate or enhance the rainfall depending on local storm wind flows. Local rainfall totals can be enhanced by orographic lift when storms are accompanied by southerly flow pushing moist air over the Santa Ynez mountains, producing greater rainfall than in other coastal areas. Diurnal temperature variation reaches a maximum in winter due to lower humidity and the absence of summer fog. On average, only 1.7 nights have freezing lows.

In general, summers are warm with very few hot days exceeding 90 °F (32 °C), and winters are comfortable and sometimes warm with occasional cooler days topping out around 54–58 °F (12–14 °C). Most days from December to February have highs of 63–69 °F (17–21 °C), and most days from June to August have highs of 72–84 °F (22–29 °C).

Summers in Santa Barbara are mostly rainless due to the presence of a high-pressure area over the eastern Pacific, but summer showers can happen due to tropical hurricane/Monsoonal flows that rarely reach the region; thunderstorms can also occur during the North American Monsoon. In the fall, afternoon or evening downslope winds, locally called "Sundowners", can raise temperatures into the high 90s °F (high 30s °C) and drop humidities into the single digits, increasing the chance of wildfires, along with their severity, due to downed power lines, etc., in the foothills north of the city.

Annual rainfall totals are highly variable and in exceptional years (like 1940–1941 and 1997–1998) over 40 inches (1,000 mm) of rain have fallen in a year, but in dry seasons less than 6 inches (150 mm) is not unheard of. Snow sometimes covers higher elevations of the Santa Ynez Mountains but is extremely rare in the city itself. The most recent accumulating snow to fall near sea level was in January 1949, when approximately 2 inches (5.1 cm) fell in the city.

Climate data for Santa Barbara, California, 1991–2020 Normals, extremes 1893-present
Month	Jan	Feb	Mar	Apr	May	Jun	Jul	Aug	Sep	Oct	Nov	Dec	Year
Record high °F (°C)	90 (32)	94 (34)	96 (36)	101 (38)	101 (38)	115 (46)	108 (42)	109 (43)	108 (42)	103 (39)	98 (37)	92 (33)	115 (46)
Mean maximum °F (°C)	78.8 (26.0)	78.8 (26.0)	81.1 (27.3)	86.2 (30.1)	84.7 (29.3)	82.1 (27.8)	85.1 (29.5)	85.8 (29.9)	88.9 (31.6)	91.4 (33.0)	84.0 (28.9)	75.8 (24.3)	95.1 (35.1)
Mean daily maximum °F (°C)	66.8 (19.3)	66.9 (19.4)	68.3 (20.2)	71.0 (21.7)	71.6 (22.0)	73.0 (22.8)	76.4 (24.7)	77.7 (25.4)	77.7 (25.4)	75.7 (24.3)	71.0 (21.7)	66.2 (19.0)	71.9 (22.2)
Daily mean °F (°C)	56.6 (13.7)	57.1 (13.9)	58.8 (14.9)	61.2 (16.2)	63.0 (17.2)	65.1 (18.4)	68.3 (20.2)	69.0 (20.6)	68.6 (20.3)	65.8 (18.8)	60.6 (15.9)	56.2 (13.4)	62.5 (17.0)
Mean daily minimum °F (°C)	46.5 (8.1)	47.3 (8.5)	49.4 (9.7)	51.4 (10.8)	54.3 (12.4)	57.3 (14.1)	60.2 (15.7)	60.3 (15.7)	59.5 (15.3)	56.0 (13.3)	50.2 (10.1)	46.1 (7.8)	53.2 (11.8)
Mean minimum °F (°C)	38.4 (3.6)	40.2 (4.6)	42.0 (5.6)	44.3 (6.8)	48.2 (9.0)	52.5 (11.4)	54.6 (12.6)	54.7 (12.6)	52.5 (11.4)	48.3 (9.1)	43.7 (6.5)	38.5 (3.6)	36.2 (2.3)
Record low °F (°C)	20 (−7)	27 (−3)	30 (−1)	30 (−1)	34 (1)	40 (4)	44 (7)	40 (4)	33 (1)	31 (−1)	28 (−2)	23 (−5)	20 (−7)
Average precipitation inches (mm)	4.43 (113)	4.41 (112)	3.20 (81)	1.01 (26)	0.41 (10)	0.14 (3.6)	0.01 (0.25)	0.01 (0.25)	0.05 (1.3)	0.84 (21)	1.40 (36)	3.07 (78)	18.98 (482.4)
Average precipitation days (≥ 0.01 in)	6.8	7.4	6.7	3.1	2.0	1.5	0.3	0.4	0.9	2.2	3.3	5.9	40.5
Mean monthly sunshine hours	186	197.8	279	300	310	300	341	310	270	240	180	186	3,099.8
Mean daily sunshine hours	6	7	9	10	10	10	11	10	9	8	6	6	9
Percentage possible sunshine	59	64	75	76	71	69	77	75	73	71	58	61	69
Source 1: NOAA
Source 2: Weather Atlas (sun)

Climate data for Santa Barbara, California, extremes 1859-present
Month	Jan	Feb	Mar	Apr	May	Jun	Jul	Aug	Sep	Oct	Nov	Dec	Year
Record high °F (°C)	90 (32)	94 (34)	96 (36)	101 (38)	101 (38)	133 (56)	108 (42)	109 (43)	108 (42)	103 (39)	98 (37)	92 (33)	133 (56)
Record low °F (°C)	20 (−7)	27 (−3)	30 (−1)	30 (−1)	34 (1)	40 (4)	44 (7)	40 (4)	33 (1)	31 (−1)	28 (−2)	23 (−5)	20 (−7)

== Geology and soils ==
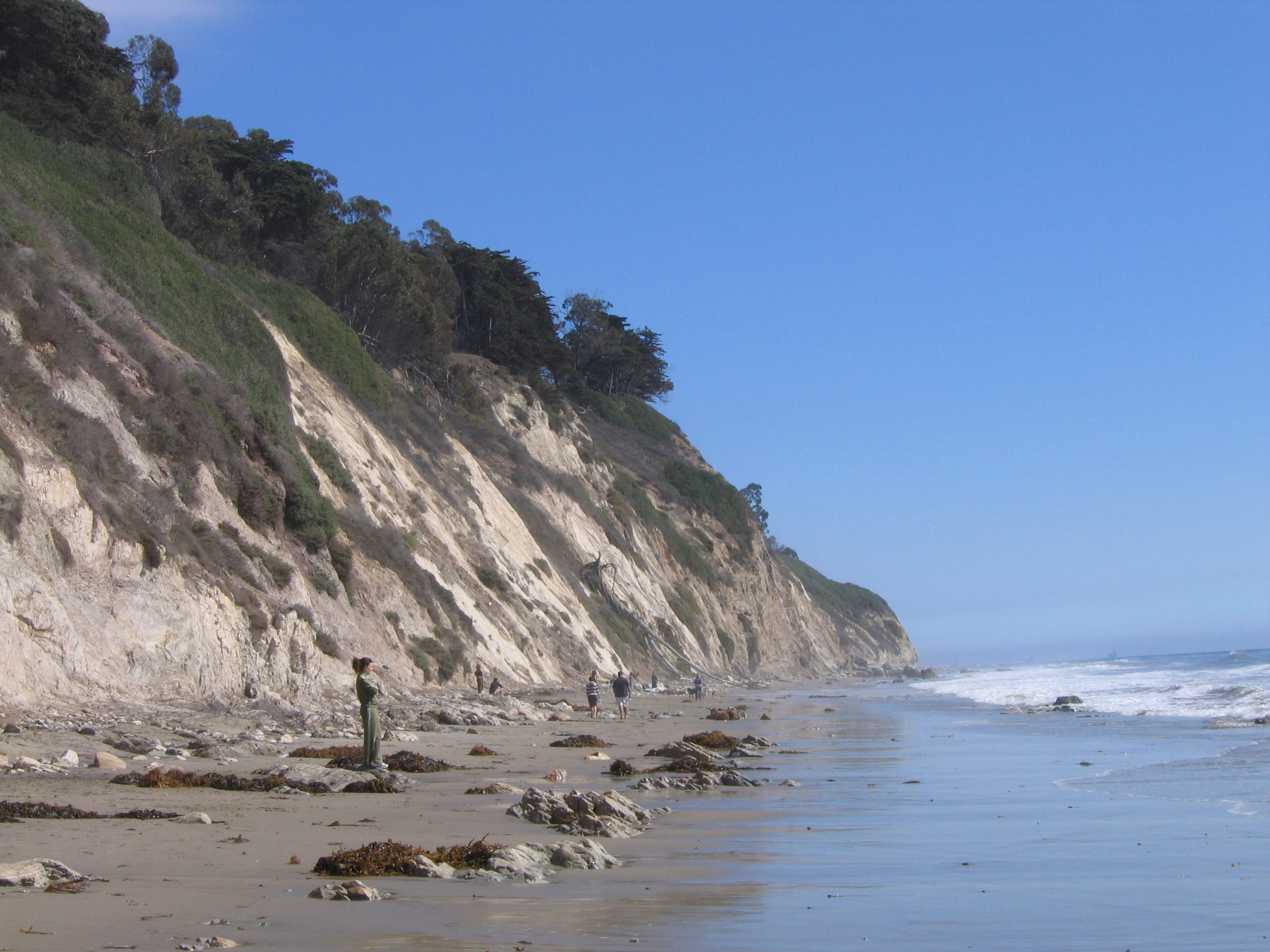
Eastward view of the coastal bluffs of the Douglas Family Preserve park from Arroyo Burro Beach

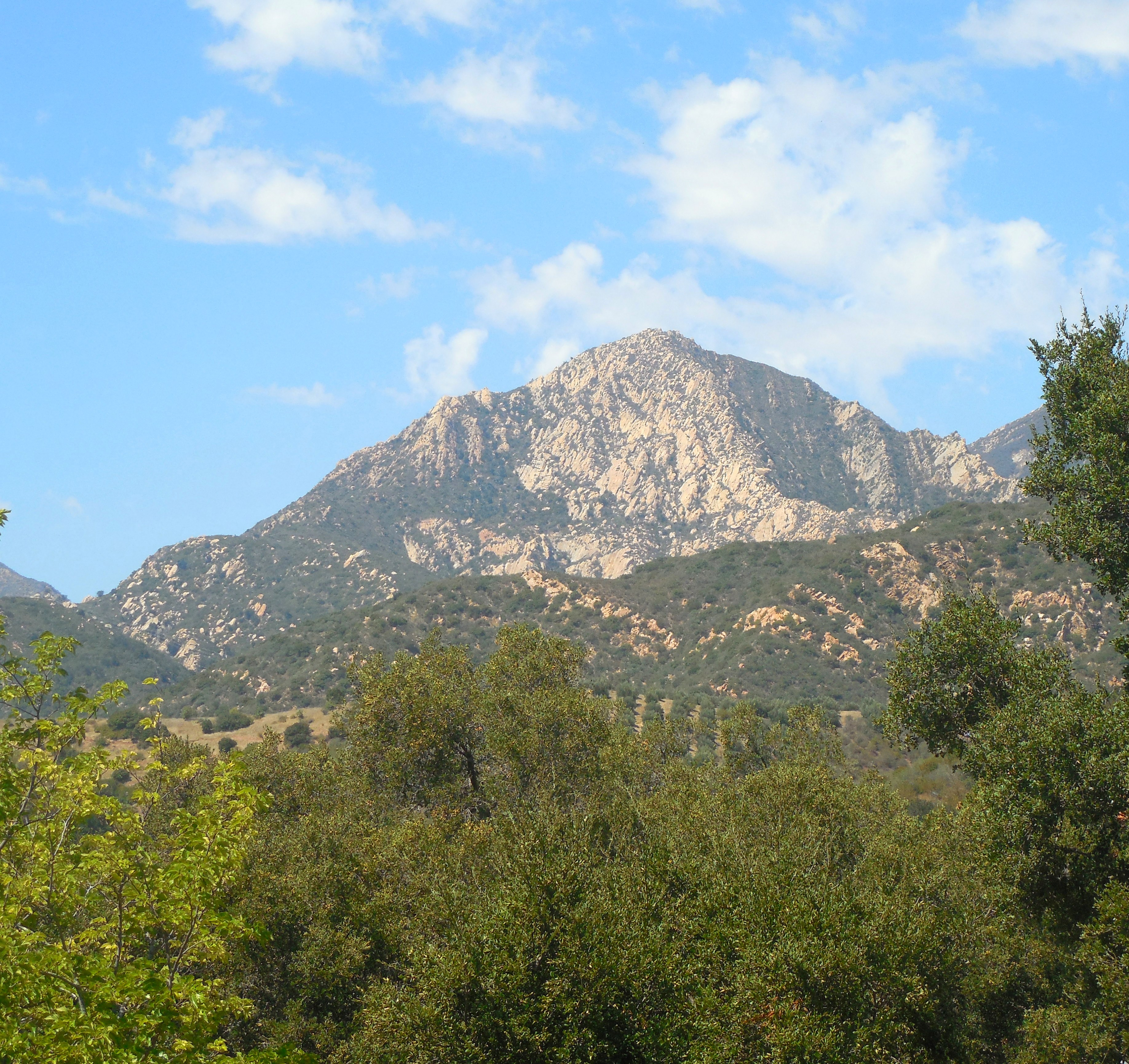
Southern view of Arlington Peak (elevation 3,250 feet; 990 m) of the Santa Ynez Mountains from Skofield Park

The city of Santa Barbara is situated on a coastal plain between the Santa Ynez Mountains and the sea. This coastal plain consists of a complex array of Holocene and Pleistocene alluvial and colluvial deposits, marine terraces, debris flows, and estuarine deposits. Soils are mostly well drained brown fine sandy loam of the Milpitas series. Rapid geologic uplift is characteristic of the entire region, as evidenced by the coastal bluffs and narrow beaches that are present along most of the coastline.

Downtown Santa Barbara occupies a floodplain between two major geologic faults, the Mission Ridge Fault Zone to the north and the Mesa Fault to the south. The Mission Ridge Fault Zone runs along the range of hills known locally as the "Riviera", and the Mesa Fault defines the northern boundary of the band of hills called the "Mesa". These two faults converge near the Five Points Shopping Center at Los Positas and State Streets. Neither is well exposed, with their locations being inferred from topography, springs, seeps, and well logs. The Mesa Fault continues southeast offshore into the Santa Barbara Channel; the portion of the fault offshore is believed to have been responsible for the destructive earthquake of 1925. The Mission Ridge Fault trends east–west, being named the More Ranch Fault west of Santa Barbara, and forms the northern boundary of the uplands which include Isla Vista, More Mesa, and the Hope Ranch Hills.

Three major sedimentary bedrock units underlie the coastal plain: the Monterey Formation, the Sisquoc Formation, and the Santa Barbara Formation. The Santa Barbara Formation is one of the main units in the aquifer underlying the city. Its coarse-grained freshwater-bearing portion, much of which is below sea level, is protected from seawater intrusion by the More Ranch Fault, which has shielded it by uplifting less-permeable rocks between it and the sea. The majority of water wells in the Santa Barbara-Goleta area pull from this geologic unit.

The Santa Ynez Mountains to the north of the city consist of multiple layers of sandstone and conglomerate units dating from the Jurassic Age to the present, uplifted rapidly since the Pliocene, upended, and in some areas completely overturned. Rapid uplift has given these mountains their craggy, scenic character, and numerous landslides and debris flows, which form some of the urban and suburban lowland areas, are testament to their geologically active nature.

== Architecture ==
The first Monterey-style adobe in California was built on State Street of Santa Barbara by the wealthy merchant Alpheus Thompson. The dominant architectural themes of Santa Barbara are the Mediterranean Revival, Spanish Colonial Revival and the related Mission Revival style, encouraged through design guidelines adopted by city leaders after the 1925 earthquake damaged the downtown commercial district. Residential architectural styles in Santa Barbara reflect the era of their construction. Many late-1800s Victorian homes remain downtown and in the "Upper East" neighborhood. California bungalows are common, built in the early decades of the 20th century. Spanish Colonial Revival-style homes built after 1925 are common all over the city. Notable modernist and contemporary homes can be found as well.

== Neighborhoods ==
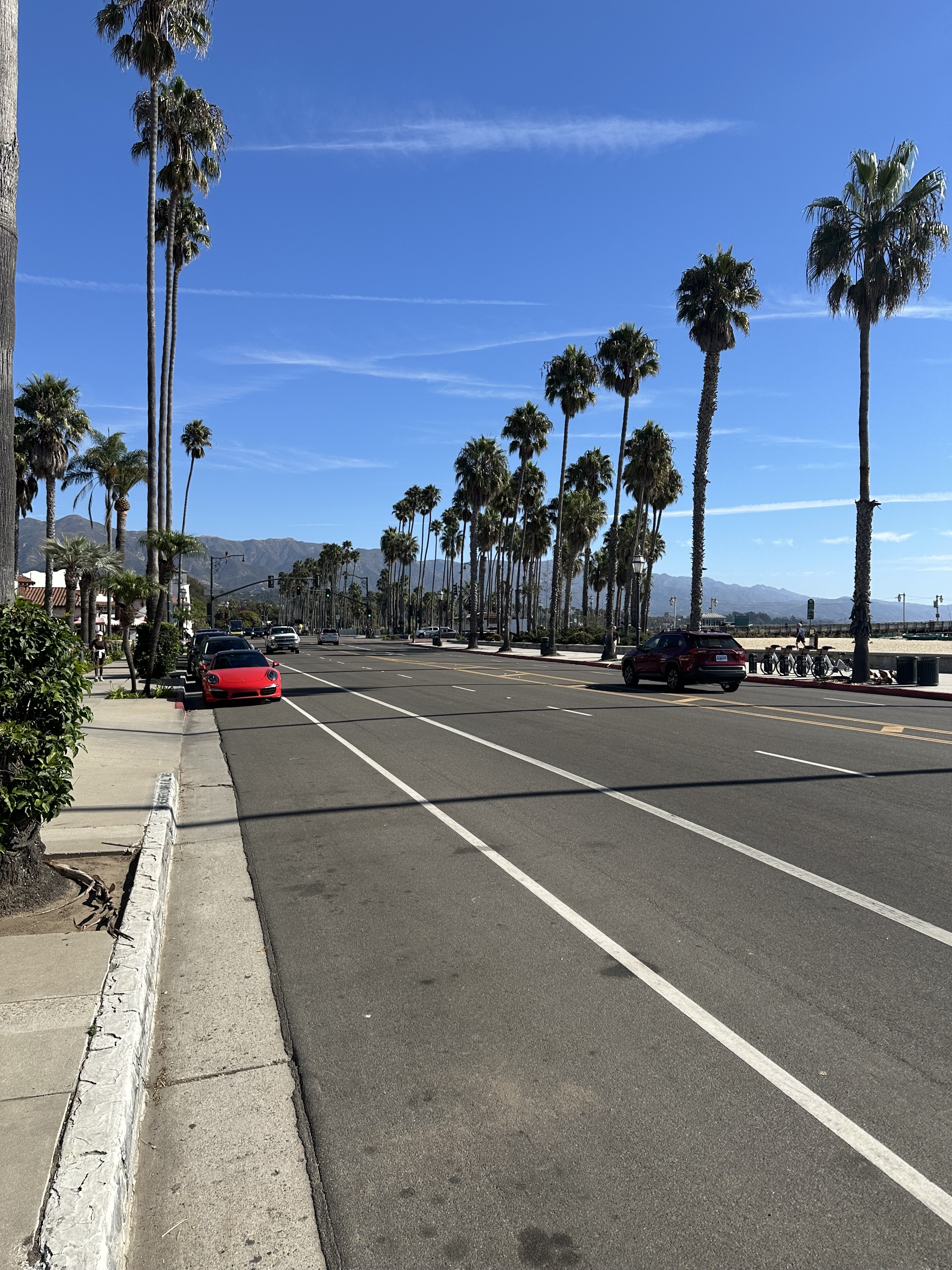
View of The Waterfront from W Cabrillo Blvd in Santa Barbara

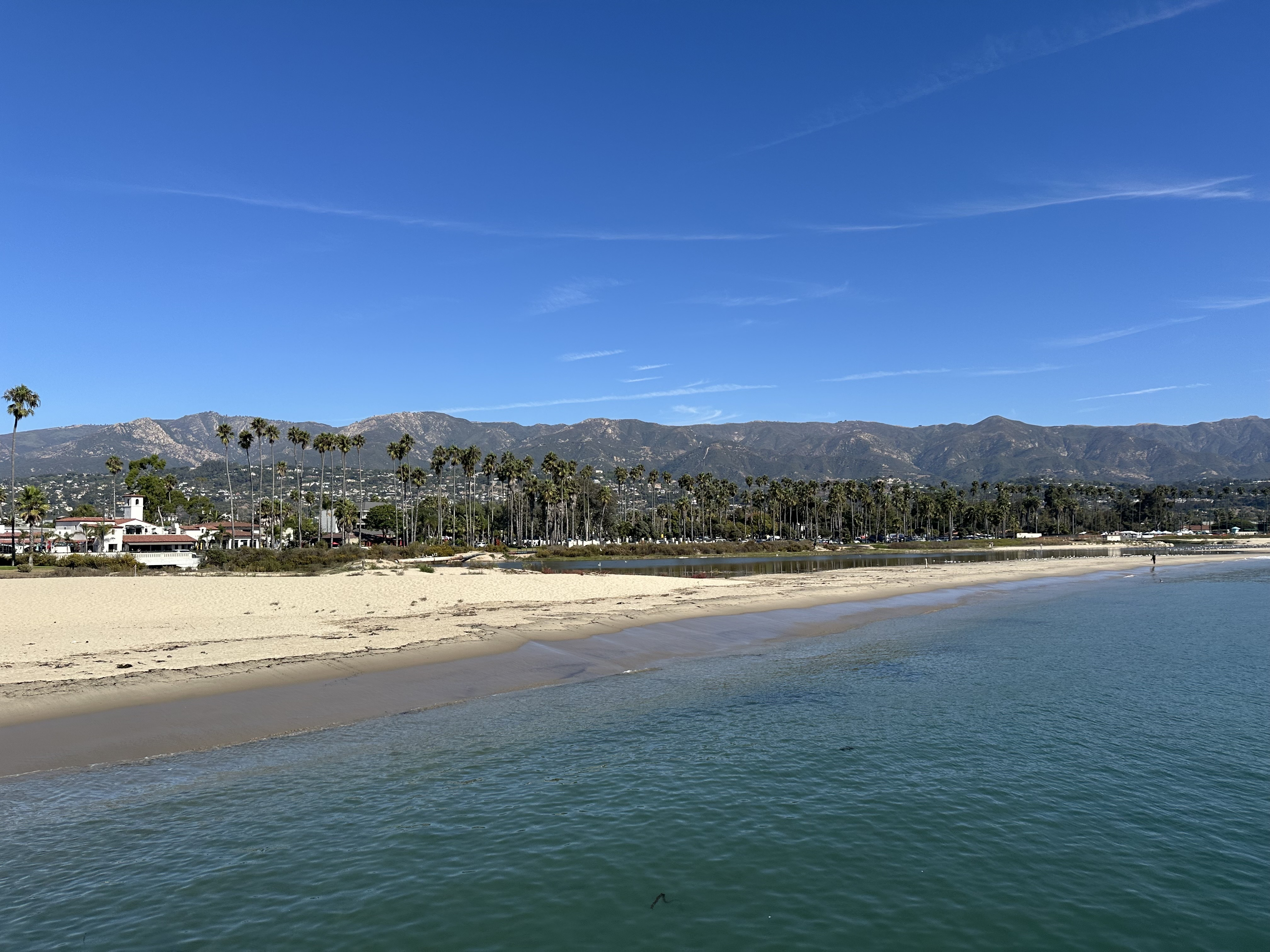
View of the Eastside and Riviera in Santa Barbara from the Stearns Wharf

Santa Barbara has a range of neighborhoods with distinctive histories, architecture, and culture. The significant consensus among locals as to the vernacular names and boundaries of these neighborhoods is generally well-reflected by local media outlets' regular use of them in daily reporting. These widely accepted neighborhood definitions differ somewhat from the City of Santa Barbara's formal administrative maps of city neighborhoods which are sometimes more granular and little used in common parlance or media reporting. Specific municipal service providers such as police, fire, public utilities, and private real estate entities may also use slightly varying neighborhood definitions. The following is a list of the most widely accepted local neighborhoods, grouped by region.

=== Downtown ===
- Downtown is the central commercial district of Santa Barbara and hosts the highest density of restaurants, bars, and nightlife. It is generally bounded by the Granada Theatre in the Northwest, down State Street to the beach.
- Lower State Street is the portion of downtown from the area of Plaza de la Guerra (home to city hall) down to the beach. It hosts the highest density of restaurants, bars, and clubs and includes the Santa Barbara train station and Funk Zone district, known for breweries and tasting rooms.
- The Waterfront comprises commercial and tourist-oriented business structures along Cabrillo Boulevard including Stearns Wharf, the Santa Barbara Harbor, and the breakwater, and extending east toward the Bird Refuge and west along Shoreline Drive above the Santa Barbara City College campus West.

=== The Eastside ===
- The Lower Eastside begins east of State Street and runs northeast to the base of the Riviera. It generally includes Santa Barbara High School, Santa Barbara Junior High School, and the Santa Barbara Bowl. The Milpas Street corridor, running from the Santa Barbara Bowl to the waterfront, is the second most important commercial strip in town, after State Street.
- The Upper Eastside begins east of State Street around Alameda Park and Alice Keck Park and comprises a primarily residential area bounded in the Northeast by Mission Santa Barbara and Alameda Padre Serra (APS) road at the base of the Riviera.
- The Riviera encompasses an ocean-facing hillside and back hillside extending for approximately two miles. The north side extends from Foothill Road to Sycamore Canyon Road, and the south side extends from the Santa Barbara Mission to Salinas Street. The ribbon-like Alameda Padre Serra road serves as the principal artery for the neighborhood. The area has been known as the "American Riviera" since at least the latter half of the 19th century due to its resemblance to the Mediterranean coastal towns of Italy and France. The neighborhood has winding streets with intricate stonework terracing built by early 20th-century Italian immigrants. Most of the topography of the Riviera is relatively steep, making it particularly noteworthy for homes with outstanding views of the City of Santa Barbara and the Pacific Ocean.
- Mission Canyon contains the wooded hilly area beginning at Mission Santa Barbara and extending along Foothill Road, north and east into Mission Canyon Road and Las Canoas Road. A popular spot as an entry-point for weekend foothill hiking, it is a rustically beautiful, though fire-prone area of Santa Barbara due to heavy natural vegetation. The area is administratively outside of Santa Barbara City limits.

=== The Westside ===
- The Westside begins west of State Street and is bounded on its western and southwestern flanks by the Mesa. The area includes residential and commercial stretches on both sides of Highway 101, and reaches down to Cliff Drive, incorporating Santa Barbara City College. At its northern extent, it includes the 'Oak Park' neighborhood and abuts Upper State Street.
- The Mesa stretches 2.5 miles (4.0 km) from Santa Barbara City College in the east to Arroyo Burro County Beach (or "Hendry's/The Pit" to locals) on the west. The neighborhood has beach access to Mesa Lane Beach, as well as Thousand Steps Beach. Residential development began here in the 1920s but was interrupted by the discovery of the Mesa Oil Field. The field was quickly exhausted, and after the Second World War, building of houses resumed, although the last oil tanks and sumps did not disappear until the early 1970s.
- Alta Mesa and Bel Air comprise most of the coastal highlands of Santa Barbara, north (landward) of the Mesa. The area is almost entirely residential and includes Honda Valley Park and Elings Park. The area's northern slope provides notable views of downtown Santa Barbara, the Riviera, the Santa Ynez Mountains, and the coast towards Ventura. The southern slope provides views of the Santa Barbara Channel and Channel Islands National Park. Due to its position along Santa Barbara County's east–west-trending southern coastline, fall and winter sunrises occur over the ocean, a rarity on the Pacific coast of the United States.
- Samarkand is a residential area home to about 2,000 inhabitants. The name Samarkand is derived from old Persian, meaning "the land of heart's desire" and was first applied to a deluxe Persian-style hotel converted from a boys' school in the area in 1920. Samarkand later became the moniker for the general neighborhood located between Las Positas Road, State Street, De La Vina Street, Oak Park, and Highway 101.

=== Upper State Street ===
- Upper State Street is the portion of State Street running east to west from the San Roque area in the east to just past the interchange of Highway 101 and California State Route 154 in the west. It is a primarily commercial corridor bounded by San Roque to its North and Highway 101 to its south. It also generally includes the "Hitchcock" area, comprising a residential portion, as well as the Earl Warren Showgrounds, and an adjacent golf course.
- San Roque is located northwest of the downtown area, bounded to its south by Upper State Street and to its north by the foothills. The area is considered to be somewhat more temperate than surrounding neighborhoods due to its relative distance from the ocean and shielding by the low coastal hills to the south of the 101 freeway. The area is almost exclusively residential except where it abuts the commercial corridor of Upper State Street.

== Demographics ==
Historical population
Census	Pop.	Note	%±
1880	3,460		—
1890	5,864		69.5%
1900	6,587		12.3%
1910	11,659		77.0%
1920	19,441		66.7%
1930	33,613		72.9%
1940	34,958		4.0%
1950	44,854		28.3%
1960	58,768		31.0%
1970	70,215		19.5%
1980	74,414		6.0%
1990	85,571		15.0%
2000	89,600		4.7%
2010	88,410		−1.3%
2020	88,665		0.3%
2024 (est.)	87,291	▼	−1.5%
U.S. Decennial Census; 1860–1870 1880-1890; 1900 1910 1920; 1930 1940 1950; 1960 1970 1980; 1990 2000 2010; 2020

=== Racial and ethnic composition ===
Santa Barbara city, California – Racial and ethnic composition Note: the US Census treats Hispanic/Latino as an ethnic category. This table excludes Latinos from the racial categories and assigns them to a separate category. Hispanics/Latinos may be of any race.
Race / Ethnicity (NH = Non-Hispanic)	Pop 2000	Pop 2010	Pop 2020	% 2000	% 2010	% 2020
White alone (NH)	53,849	48,417	45,882	58.33%	54.76%	51.75%
Black or African American alone (NH)	1,418	1,177	1,086	1.54%	1.33%	1.22%
Native American or Alaska Native alone (NH)	405	313	275	0.44%	0.35%	0.31%
Asian alone (NH)	2,467	2,927	3,047	2.67%	3.31%	3.44%
Pacific Islander alone (NH)	98	94	61	0.11%	0.11%	0.07%
Other Race alone (NH)	180	186	569	0.19%	0.21%	0.64%
Mixed race or Multiracial (NH)	1,578	1,705	3,401	1.71%	1.93%	3.84%
Hispanic or Latino (any race)	32,330	33,591	34,344	35.02%	37.99%	38.73%
Total	92,325	88,410	88,665	100.00%	100.00%	100.00%

=== 2020 census ===
As of the 2020 census, Santa Barbara had a population of 88,665, with 35,383 households and 19,257 families. The population density was 4,545.3 people per square mile (1,755.0 people/km^{2}). There were 38,208 housing units at an average density of 1,958.7 units per square mile (756.3 units/km^{2}).

99.8% of residents lived in urban areas, while 0.2% lived in rural areas.

The racial makeup was 58.5% (51,842) white, 1.4% (1,238) black or African-American, 1.5% (1,320) Native American or Alaska Native, 3.6% (3,184) Asian, 0.1% (80) Pacific Islander or Native Hawaiian, 17.6% (15,623) from other races, and 17.3% (15,378) from two or more races. Hispanic or Latino of any race was 38.7% (34,344) of the population.

Of the 35,383 households, 23.5% had children under the age of 18. Of all households, 38.5% were married-couple households, 21.8% had a male householder with no spouse or partner present, and 31.2% had a female householder with no spouse or partner present. About 32.3% consisted of individuals, and 14.3% had someone living alone who was 65 years of age or older. The average household size was 2.4 and the average family size was 3.0.

Of the 38,208 housing units, 7.4% were vacant. The homeowner vacancy rate was 1.1% and the rental vacancy rate was 4.1%.

The median age was 40.2 years. The age distribution was 16.6% under the age of 18, 9.8% from 18 to 24, 29.4% from 25 to 44, 24.1% from 45 to 64, and 20.1% who were 65 years of age or older. For every 100 females, there were 95.7 males, and for every 100 females age 18 and older, there were 94.6 males age 18 and older.

=== 2016–2020 American Community Survey ===
The percent of those with a bachelor's degree or higher was estimated to be 38.9% of the population.

The 2016–2020 5-year American Community Survey estimates show that the median household income was $81,618 (with a margin of error of +/- $3,653) and the median family income was $105,513 (+/- $9,757). Males had a median income of $44,225 (+/- $2,697) versus $33,978 (+/- $2,747) for females. The median income for those above 16 years old was $40,200 (+/- $1,911). Approximately, 7.2% of families and 12.3% of the population were below the poverty line, including 11.2% of those under the age of 18 and 8.5% of those ages 65 or over.

=== Religion ===
Santa Barbara is home to various religious institutions, including Mission Santa Barbara and Congregation B'nai B'rith, a Reform Jewish synagogue founded in 1927.

=== 2010 census ===
City of Santa Barbara 2010 U.S. Census
Self-identified Race	Percent of population
White alone	75.1%
African American	1.6%
Asian	3.5%
American Indians and Alaska Natives	1.0%
Native Hawaiians and Other Pacific Islanders	0.1%
Two or more races	3.9%
Some Other Race	14.7%
Total	100%
Hispanic and Latino American (of any race): 38.0%

According to the 2010 United States census the racial makeup of Santa Barbara was 66,411 (75.1%) White; 1,420 (1.6%) African American; 892 (1.0%) Native American; 3,062 (3.5%) Asian (1.0% Chinese, 0.6% Filipino, 0.5% Japanese, 0.4% Korean, 0.4% Indian, 0.2% Vietnamese, 0.4% other); 116 (0.1%) Pacific Islander; 13,032 (14.7%) from other races; 3,477 (3.9%) from two or more races. Hispanics or Latinos of any race were 33,591 persons (38.0%). Non-Hispanic Whites were 45,852 persons (52.2%)

The Census reported that 86,783 people (98.2% of the population) lived in households, 1,172 (1.3%) lived in non-institutionalized group quarters, and 455 (0.5%) were institutionalized.

Of the 35,449 households, 8,768 (24.7%) had children under the age of 18 living in them, 13,240 (37.3%) were opposite-sex married couples living together, 3,454 (9.7%) had a female householder with no husband present, and 1,539 (4.3%) had a male householder with no wife present. There were 2,420 (6.8%) unmarried opposite-sex partnerships, and 339 (1.0%) same-sex married couples or partnerships; 11,937 households (33.7%) were made up of individuals, and 4,340 (12.2%) had someone living alone who was 65 years of age or older. The average household size was 2.45. There were 18,233 families (51.4% of all households); the average family size was 3.13.

The age distribution of the city was the following: 16,468 people (18.6%) under the age of 18, 10,823 people (12.2%) aged 18 to 24, 26,241 people (29.7%) aged 25 to 44, 22,305 people (25.2%) aged 45 to 64, and 12,573 people (14.2%) who were 65 years of age or older. The median age was 36.8 years. For every 100 females, there were 98.5 males. For every 100 females age 18 and over, there were 97.7 males.

There were 37,820 housing units at an average density of 901.2 units per square mile (348.0 units/km^{2}), of which 13,784 (38.9%) were owner-occupied, and 21,665 (61.1%) were occupied by renters. The homeowner vacancy rate was 1.3%; the rental vacancy rate was 4.1%; 34,056 people (38.5% of the population) lived in owner-occupied housing units and 52,727 people (59.6%) lived in rental housing units.

=== 2000 census ===
As of the census of 2000, 92,325 people*, 35,605 households, and 18,941 families resided in the city. The population density was 4,865.3 inhabitants per square mile (1,878.5/km^{2}). There were 37,076 housing units at an average density of 1,953.8 units per square mile (754.4 units/km^{2}). The racial makeup of the city was 74.0% White, 1.8% African American, 1.1% Native American, 2.8% Asian, 0.1% Pacific Islander, 16.4% from other races, and 3.9% from two or more races. People of Hispanic or Latino background, of any race, were 35.0% of the population.

Of the 35,605 households, 24.3% had children under the age of 18 living with them, 39.8% were married couples living together, 9.5% had a female householder with no husband present, and 46.8% were not families. About 32.9% of all households were made up of individuals, and 11.4% had someone living alone who was 65 years of age or older. The average household size was 2.47 and the average family size was 3.17.

In the city, the population was distributed as 19.8% under the age of 18, 13.8% from 18 to 24, 32.3% from 25 to 44, 20.4% from 45 to 64, and 13.8% who were 65 years of age or older. The median age was 35 years. For every 100 females, there were 97.0 males. For every 100 females age 18 and over, there were 95.0 males.

The median income for a household in the city was $47,498, and for a family was $57,880. Males had a median income of $37,116 versus $31,911 for females. The per capita income for the city was $26,466. About 7.7% of families and 13.4% of the population were below the poverty line, including 16.8% of those under age 18 and 7.4% of those age 65 or over. If one compares the per capita income to the actual cost of living, the number of people living below the poverty line is considerably higher.

== Economy ==
Aerospace and defense companies such as Alliant Techsystems, Channel Technologies Group, FLIR Systems, and Raytheon have major operations in the area. As a tourist destination, the hospitality industry has a significant presence in the regional economy. Among notable business ventures and innovations, Motel 6 was started in Santa Barbara in 1962. Sambo's Restaurant was founded in Santa Barbara in 1957 by Sam Battistone and Newell Bohnett. The Egg McMuffin was invented by Herb Peterson at the upper State Street McDonald's. The Habit Burger Grill restaurant chain began in Old Town Goleta. Kinko's (now owned by FedEx and known as FedEx Office) was founded by Paul Orfalea in Isla Vista, near UC Santa Barbara, in 1970.

As of June 2021, southern Santa Barbara County employed more than half of the county's total workers. The county's largest employers are:

#	Employer	# of Employees	% of Total Employment
1	County of Santa Barbara	4,307	4.89%
2	University of California, Santa Barbara	4,250	4.83%
3	Cottage Health Organization	4,458 (2024)	3.69%
4	Mission Linen Supply	2,000	2.27%
5	AppFolio	1,350	1.53%
6	Santa Barbara Unified School District	1,350	1.53%
7	City of Santa Barbara	1,200	1.36%
8	Sansum Medical Foundation Clinic	1,200	1.36%
9	Raytheon Electronic Systems	1,100	1.25%
10	Procore	900	1.02%

Other major employers include Jordano's, Marborg Industries, the Santa Barbara Biltmore and San Ysidro Ranch, Westmont College, Mentor, CJ Affiliate, Beachfront Hilton Resort, Belmond El Encanto and QAD.

Retail centers include the traditional downtown area along lower State Street, where the Paseo Nuevo shopping center is located, and La Cumbre Plaza on upper State Street.

== Arts and culture ==
=== Performing arts ===
Santa Barbara contains numerous performing art venues, including the 2,000-seat Arlington Theatre, which is the largest indoor performance venue in Santa Barbara and the site of the annual Santa Barbara International Film Festival. Other major venues include the Lobero Theatre, a historic building and favorite venue for small concerts; the Granada Theatre, the tallest building downtown, originally built by contractor C.B. Urton in 1924, but with the theatre remodeled and reopened in March 2008; and the Santa Barbara Bowl, a 4,562-seat outdoor amphitheater in a canyon at the base of the Riviera.

The city is considered a haven for classical music lovers with the Santa Barbara Symphony Orchestra, a professional opera company, and many non-profit classical music groups (such as CAMA). Several youth orchestras are also located in Santa Barbara, such as the Santa Barbara Youth Symphony. The Music Academy of the West, located in Montecito, hosts an annual music festival in the summer, drawing renowned students and professionals.

=== Tourism ===
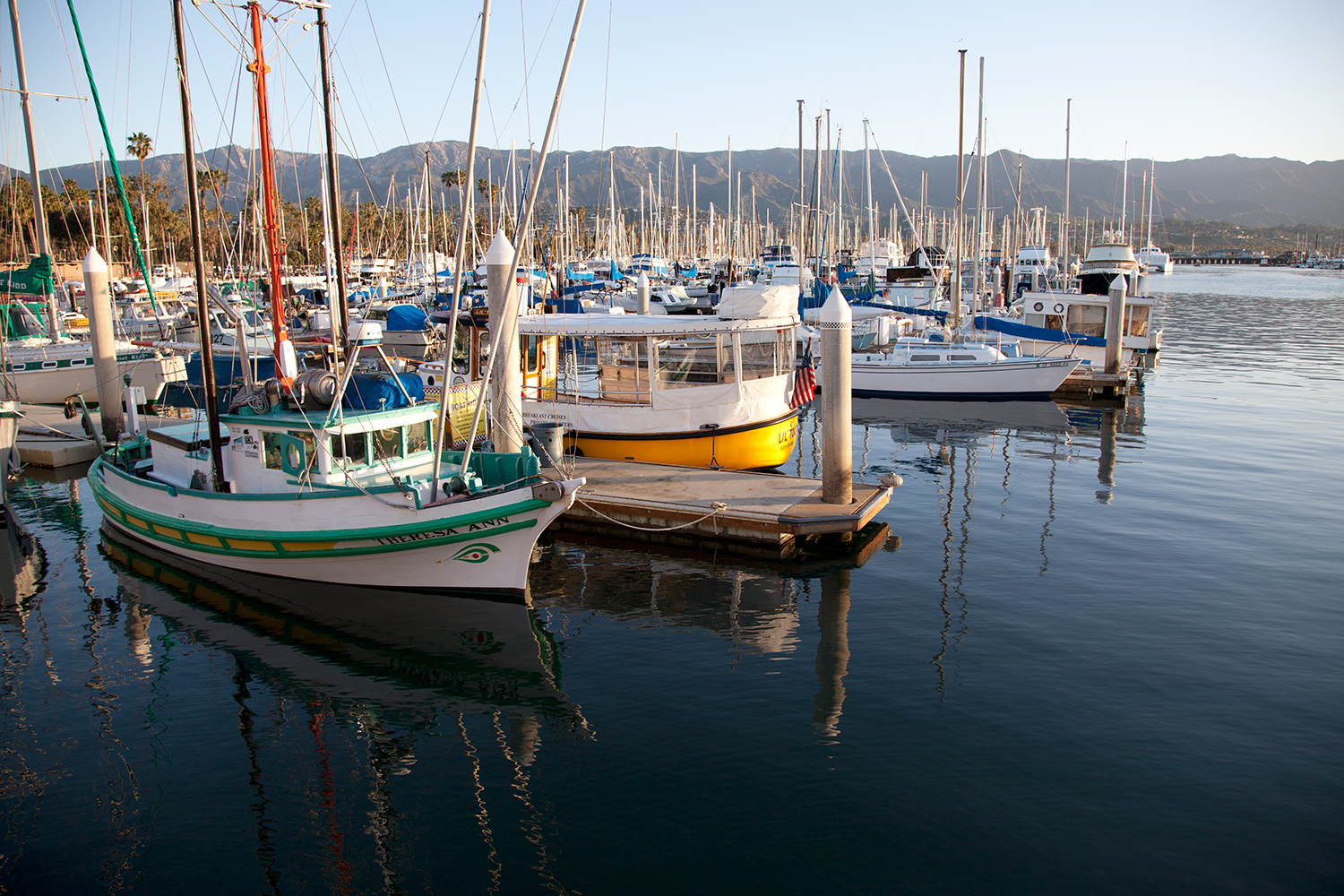
Santa Barbara Harbor

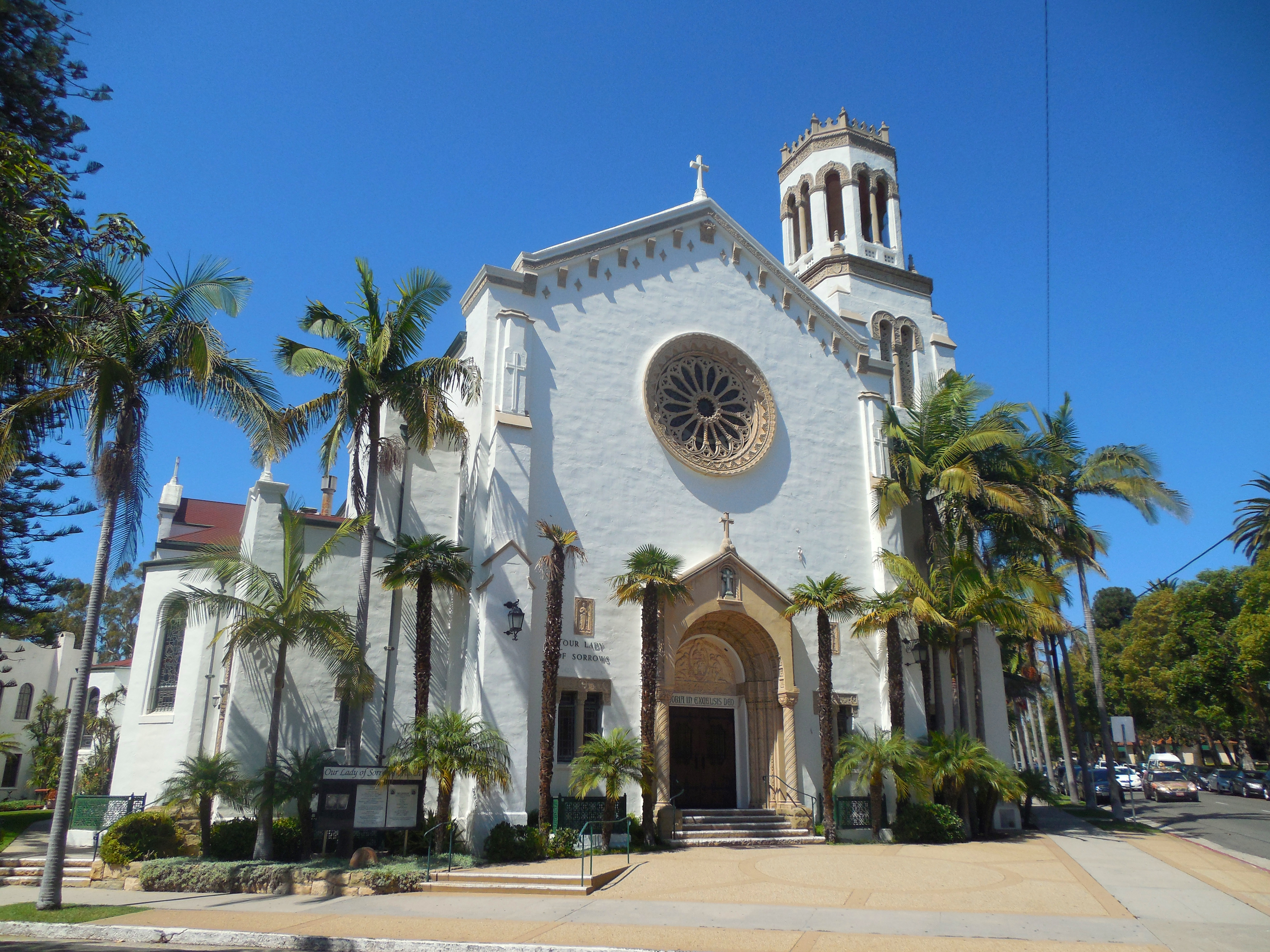
Our Lady of Sorrows Church across from Alameda Park

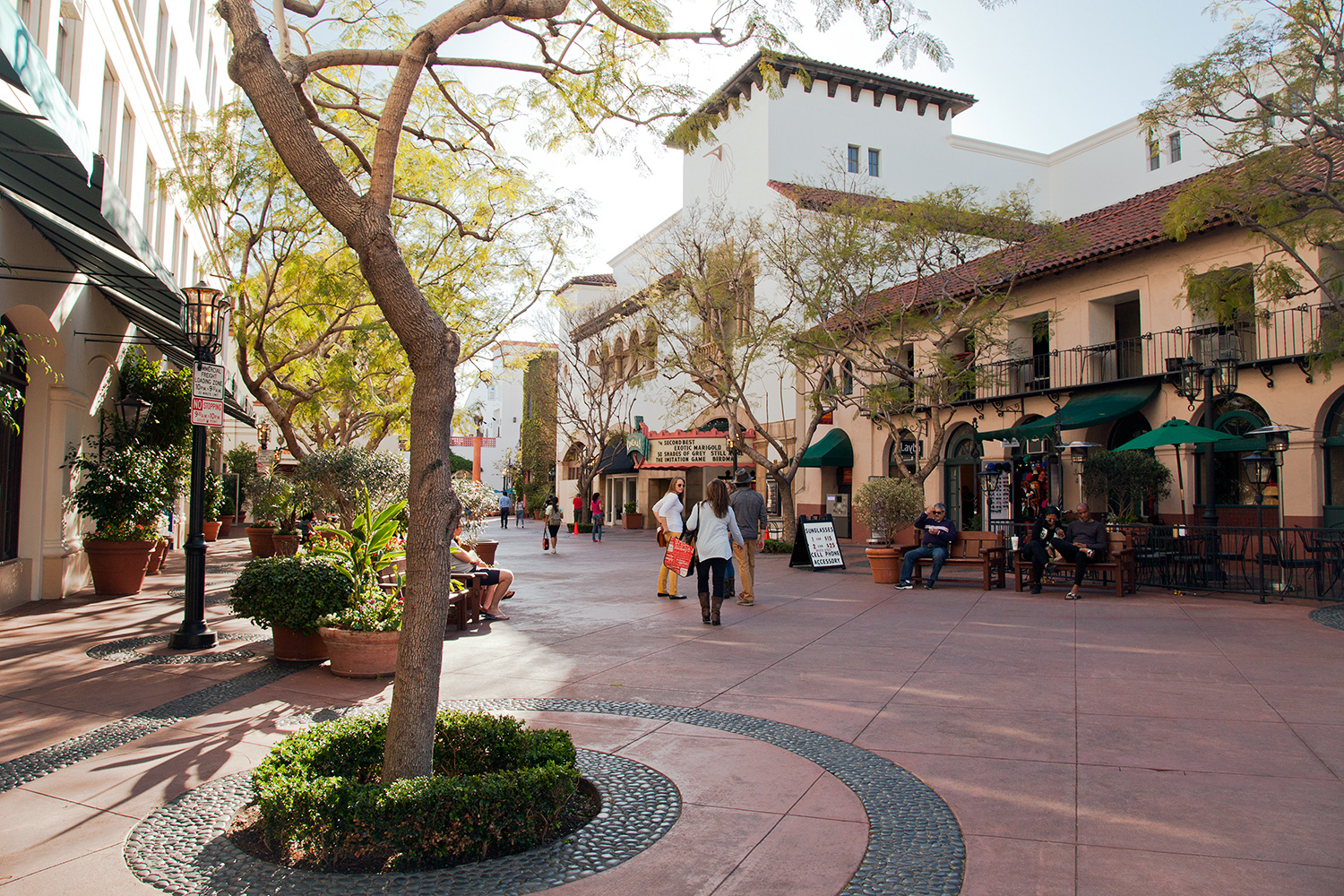
Outdoor shops in downtown Santa Barbara

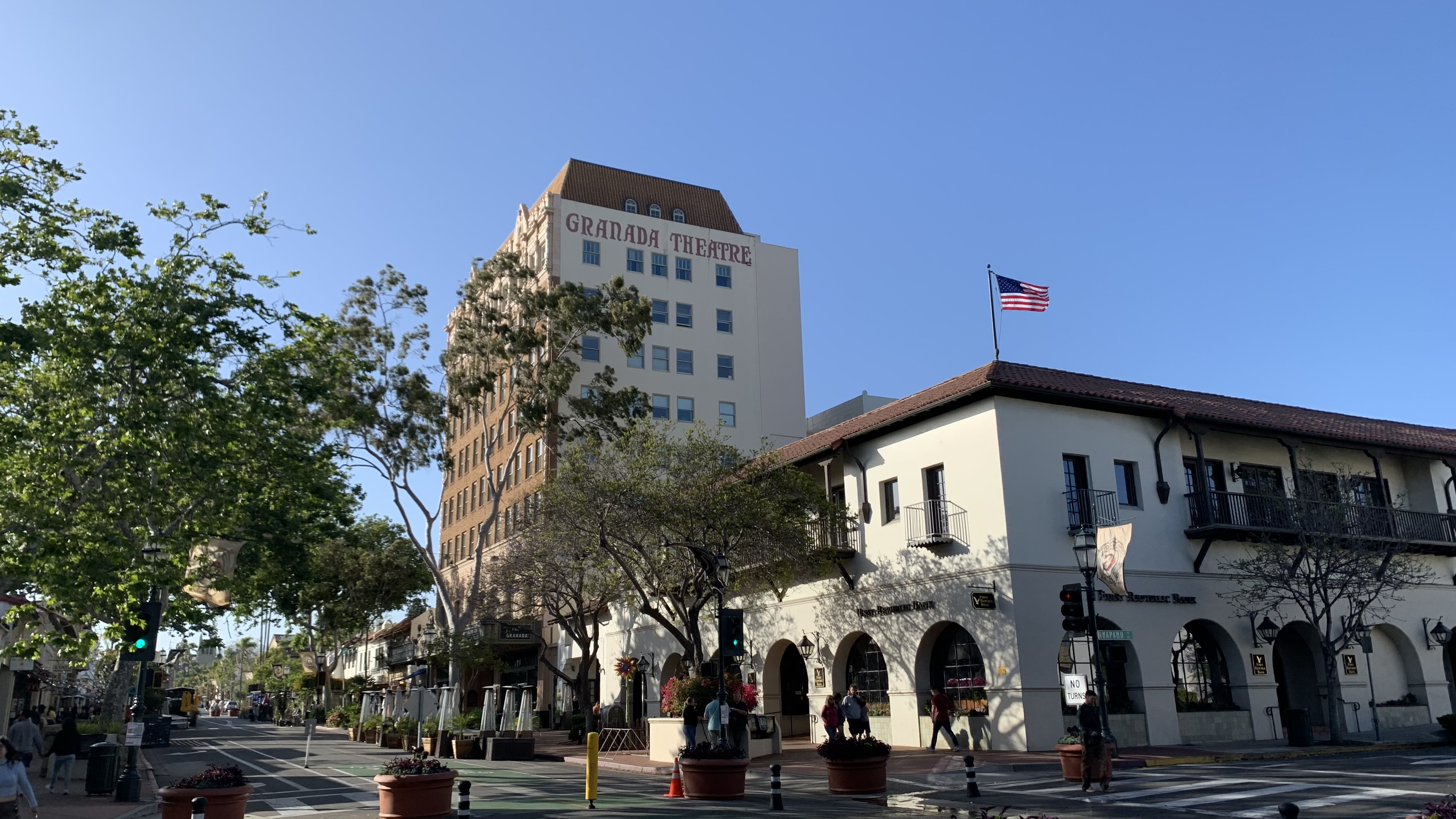
The Granada Theatre

Santa Barbara is a year-round tourist destination renowned for its fair weather, downtown beaches, and Spanish architecture. Tourism brings more than one billion dollars per year into the local economy, including $80 million in tax revenue. The waterfront along Cabrillo Boulevard is a draw for tourists centered on Stearns Wharf. The pier features shops, restaurants, and the Ty Warner Sea Center.

Mission Santa Barbara, "The Queen of the Missions", is an active Franciscan mission and place of worship, sightseeing stop, and national historic landmark. Annually over the Memorial Day weekend, there is a chalk-art festival known as I Madonnari, with ephemeral works of art created on the asphalt in front of the mission, and food stalls set up and music.

The Santa Barbara County Courthouse, a red tiled Spanish-Moorish structure, provides a view of the downtown area from its open-air tower. Its surrounding gardens, known as the Sunken Gardens, are a popular location for many events, from weddings to city-hosted summer movie nights in the park. The Presidio of Santa Barbara, a Spanish military installation and chapel built in 1782, was central to the town's early development and colonial roots. In 1855, the Presidio Chapel, being in decay, grew into the Apostolic College of Our Lady of Sorrows, now Our Lady of Sorrows Church.

=== Events ===
The annual Old Spanish Days Fiesta is celebrated every year in August. The Fiesta is hosted by the Native Daughters of the Golden West and the Native Sons of the Golden West in a joint committee called the Fiesta Board. Fiesta was originally started as a tourist attraction, like the Rose Bowl, to draw business into the town in the 1920s. Flower Girls and Las Señoritas march and participate in both Fiesta Pequeña (the kickoff of Fiesta) and the various parades. Flower Girls is for girls under 13. They throw roses and other flowers into the crowds. Las Señoritas are their older escorts. Many Señoritas join the Native Daughters at the age of 16.

The annual Santa Barbara French Festival takes place on Bastille Day weekend in July and is the largest French Festival in the western United States.

New Noise Music Conference and Festival, established in 2009, is a four-day event with the main party in the Funk Zone, a small art and wine tasting section of the city near the beach, and other small bands to local venues around the city. New Noise brings in over 75 bands and 50 speakers to the festival each year.

For over 40 years, the Santa Barbara Arts and Crafts Show has been held on Cabrillo Boulevard, east of Stearns Wharf and along the beach, attracting thousands of people to see artwork made by artists and crafts people that live in Santa Barbara County. By the rules of the show, all the works displayed must have been made by the artists and craftspeople themselves, who sell their own goods. The show started in the early 1960s and now has over 200 booths on Sundays. The show is also held on some Saturdays that are national holidays, but not during inclement weather.

The Santa Barbara International Film Festival, another local non-profit, draws over 50,000 attendees during what is usually Santa Barbara's slow season in late January. SBIFF hosts a wide variety of celebrities, premieres, panels and movies from around the world and runs for 10 days.

The annual Summer Solstice Parade draws up to 100,000 people. It is a colorful themed parade put on by local residents, and follows a route along Santa Barbara Street (formerly State Street) for approximately one mile, ending at Alameda Park. Its main rule is that no written messages or banners with words are allowed. Floats and costumes vary from the whimsical to the outrageous; parties and street events take place throughout the weekend of the parade, the first weekend after the solstice.

=== Other attractions ===
- Rafael Gonzalez House – Adobe residence of the alcalde of Santa Barbara in the 1820s, and a National Historic Landmark
- Santa Barbara's Moreton Bay Fig Tree – a giant Moreton Bay Fig, 80 feet (25 m) tall, which has one of the largest total shaded areas of any tree in North America
- Burton Mound – on Mason Street at Burton Circle, this mound is thought to be the Chumash village of Syujton, recorded by Juan Rodríguez Cabrillo in 1542, and again by Fr. Crespí and Portolá in 1769. (California Historical Landmark No. 306)
- De La Guerra Plaza (Casa de la Guerra) – Site of the first City Hall, and still the center of the city's administration. (California Historical Landmark No. 307)
- Covarrubias Adobe – Built in 1817; adjacent to the Santa Barbara Historical Museum on Santa Barbara Street. (California Historical Landmark No. 308)
- Hastings Adobe – Built in 1854, partially from material recovered from the wreck of the S.S. Winfield Scott. (California Historical Landmark No. 559)
- Hill-Carrillo Adobe – Built in 1825 by Daniel A. Hill for his wife Rafaela L. Ortega y Olivera at 11 E. Carrillo Street.
- Santa Barbara Zoo
- Channel Islands National Marine Sanctuary
- Channel Islands National Park
- El Presidio de Santa Bárbara State Historic Park

=== Museums ===
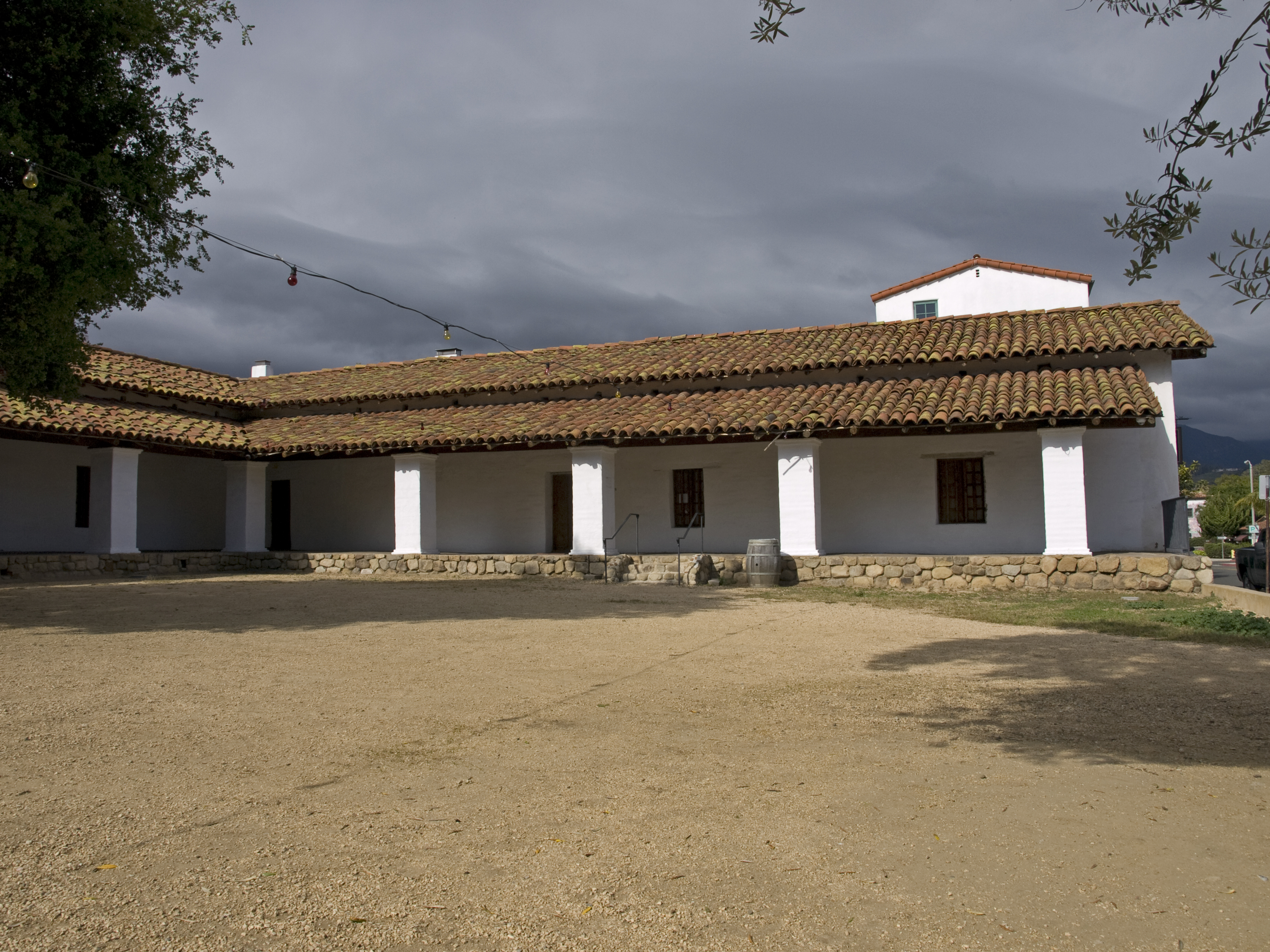
Casa de la Guerra is currently open as a museum.

The Santa Barbara Museum of Art (SBMA), located on State Street, features nationally recognized collections and special exhibitions of international importance. Highlights of the Museum's permanent collection include antiquities; 19th-century French, British, and American art; 20th-century and contemporary European, North American, and Latin American art; Asian art; photography; and works on paper. It has an education program that serves local and surrounding communities through extensive on-site programming and curriculum resources.

The Museum of Contemporary Art Santa Barbara, located on the top floor of Paseo Nuevo shopping mall, is a non-profit, non-collecting museum dedicated to the exhibition, education, and cultivation of the arts of our time. It offers free admission to its exhibitions and public programming.

Other art venues include the University Art Museum on the University of California at Santa Barbara Campus, various private galleries, and a wide variety of art and photography shows. The Santa Barbara Museum of Natural History is located immediately behind the Santa Barbara Mission in a complex of Mission-style buildings set in a park-like campus. The Museum offers indoor and outdoor exhibits and a state-of-the-art planetarium.

The Santa Barbara Historical Museum is located on De La Guerra Street. The Santa Barbara Maritime Museum is located at 113 Harbor Way (the former Naval Reserve Center Santa Barbara) on the waterfront. Two open-air museums here are Lotusland and Casa del Herrero, exemplifying the American Country Place era in Santa Barbara. Casa Dolores, center for the popular arts of Mexico, is devoted to the collection, preservation, study, and exhibition of an extensive variety of objects of the popular arts of Mexico.

The Reagan Ranch Center is a three-story museum and gallery operated by Young America's Foundation, next to the Amtrak Station on Lower State Street. Its focus is the history of the Rancho del Cielo and the role it played in Ronald Reagan's life.

MOXI, The Wolf Museum of Exploration + Innovation is a non-profit science and children's museum at 125 State Street. A 501(c)(3) non-profit, the museum opened on February 25th, 2017.

== Sports ==
Athletics teams wearing the UC Santa Barbara Gauchos uniform are some of the most popular spectator sports locally. The Gauchos field 20 varsity teams in NCAA Division I, most of which play in the Big West Conference. Popular teams include the men's soccer team, which averages over 3,800 fans per game, and the men's basketball team, which averages over 2,300 fans per game.

Santa Barbara annually hosts the Semana Nautica Summer Sports Festival. One of the main events of the festival is the Semana Nautica 15K, the oldest continuously running race on California's central coast. Nite Moves is a popular local 5k race, with an optional ocean swim portion, open to all ages and held on Wednesday evenings from May to the end of August.

Surfing is a part of Santa Barbara culture. The late Bruce Brown's cult classic documentary, The Endless Summer, put surfing on the map, and he was often seen around town prior to his death in December 2017. Surfing legend Pat Curren and his son, three-time world champion Tom Curren, as well as ten-time world champion Kelly Slater, and other popular surfers such as Shaun Tompson, Jack Johnson and Chris Brown call Santa Barbara home. The Channel Islands block summer surf swells that come from the tropics or further south, the southern hemisphere. For these reasons Santa Barbara is viewed as a winter surf location.

== Parks and recreation ==
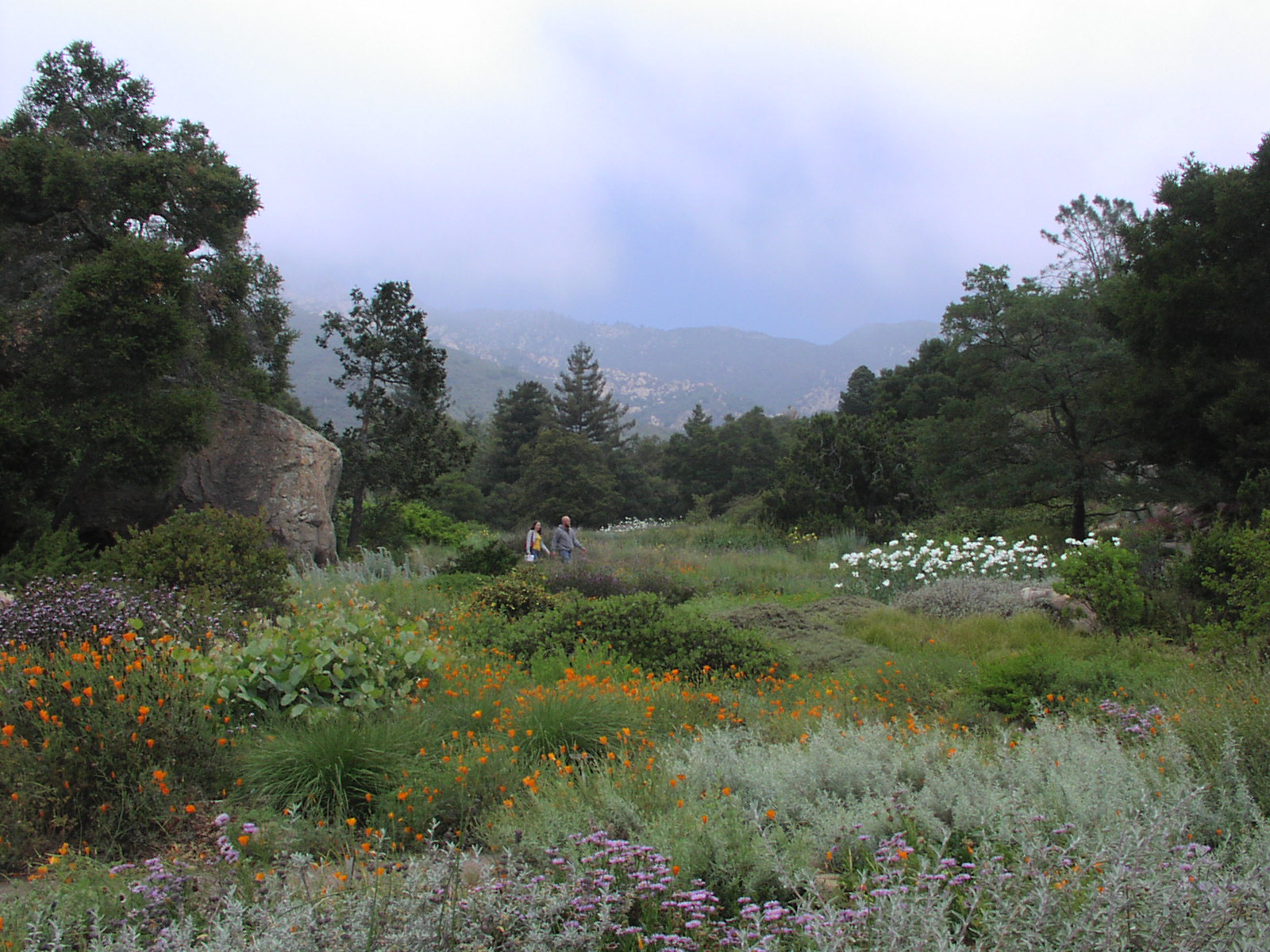
The central meadow region of the Santa Barbara Botanic Garden

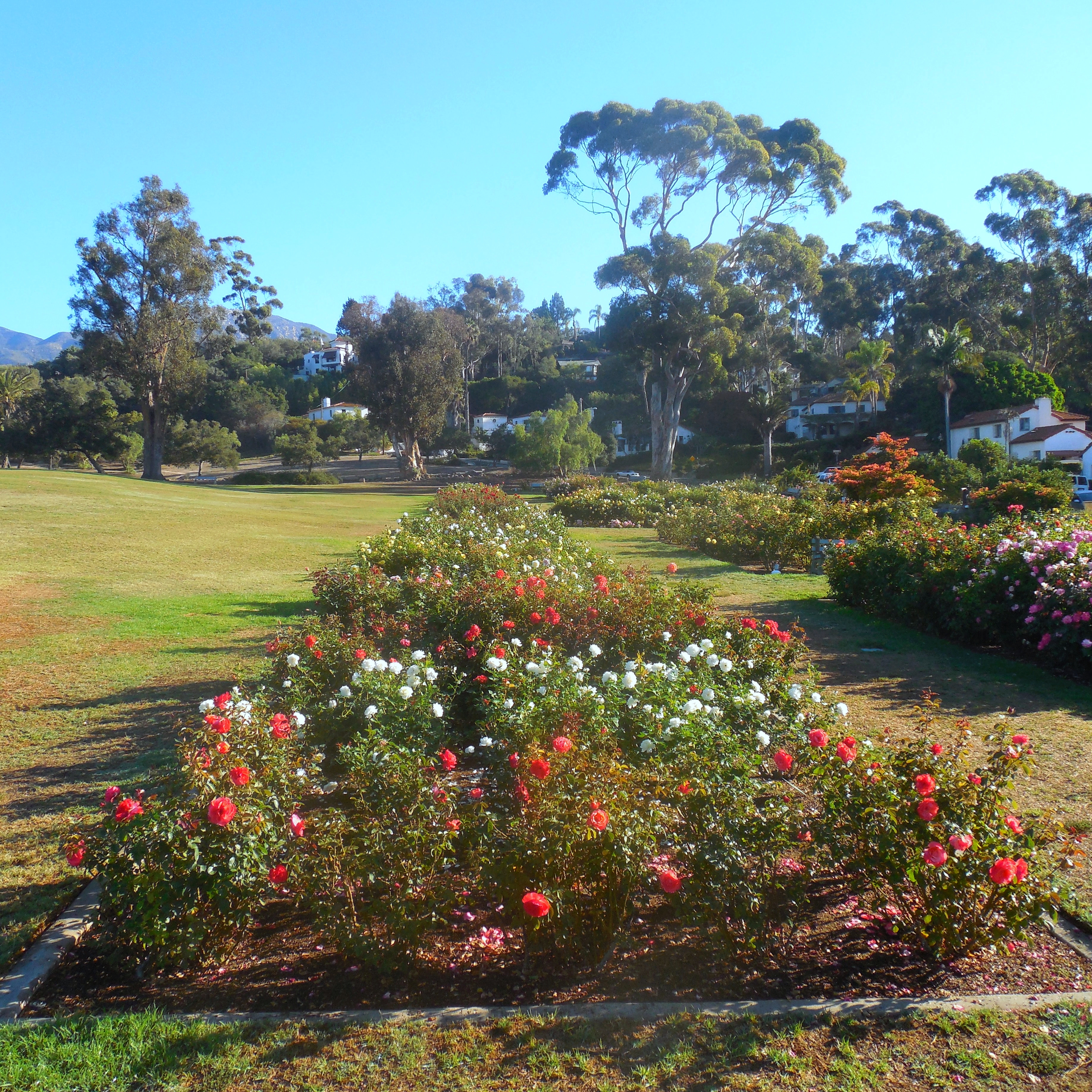
The A.C. Postel Memorial Rose Garden in Mission Historical Park

Santa Barbara has many parks, ranging from small spaces within the urban environment to large, semi-wilderness areas that remain within the city limits. Some notable parks within the city limits are as follows:

- Alameda Park
- Alice Keck Park Memorial Garden
- Andree Clark Bird Refuge
- Butterfly Beach
- De La Guerra Plaza
- Douglas Family Preserve
- East Beach
- Elings Park
- Franceschi Park
- Hendry's Beach (Arroyo Burro)
- Hilda Ray Park
- Leadbetter Beach
- Mission Historical Park
- Parma Park
- Shoreline Park
- Skofield Park
- West Beach

Some notable parks and open spaces just outside the city limits include:

- Chumash Painted Cave State Historic Park
- Gould Park
- Rattlesnake Canyon, a popular hiking area.
- Santa Barbara Botanic Garden, which contains a diverse collection of plants from around California; it is in Mission Canyon, directly north of the city.
- Goleta Beach, BBQ grills, picnic tables, playground

In addition to these parks, there are other hiking trails in Santa Barbara. A 6–7 mile hike from Gaviota State Park traverses the mountains with an ocean view.

== Government ==
In 2015, the city council voted to change from at-large elections to district elections for city council seats.

All of Santa Barbara County falls into California's 24th congressional district. The district leans towards the Democratic Party, with a PVI of D+10, making it politically aligned with the rest of California overall. The current Representative is Salud Carbajal.

== Education ==
=== Colleges and universities ===
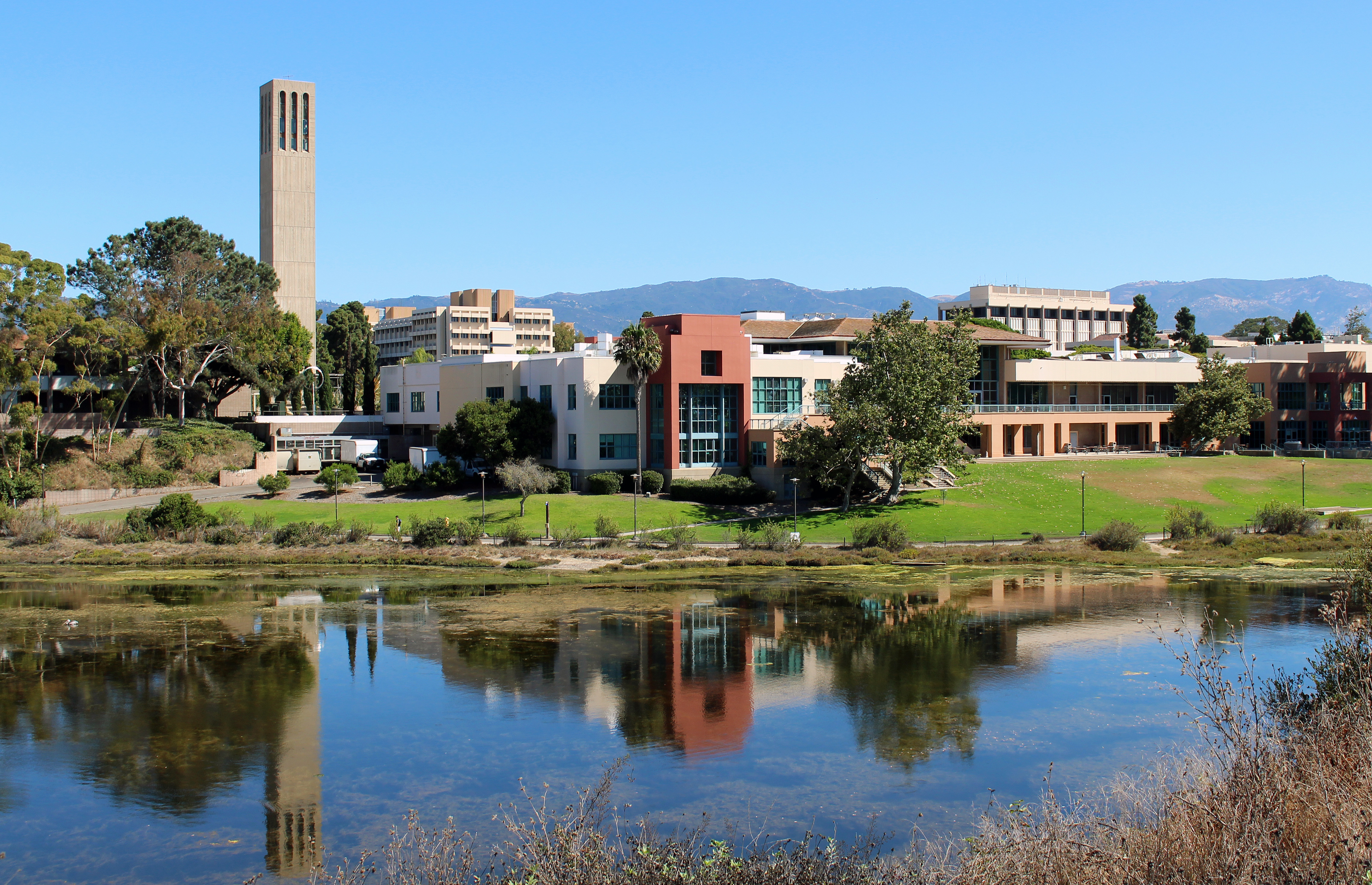
University of California, Santa Barbara. It is located to the west of the city and is a major contributor to the city and its demographic makeup.

Santa Barbara and the immediately adjacent area is home to several colleges and universities:

==== Research university ====
- University of California, Santa Barbara

==== Liberal arts colleges ====
- Westmont College
- Antioch University

==== Community college ====
- Santa Barbara City College

==== Trade schools ====
- Santa Barbara Business College

==== Conservatory ====
- Music Academy of the West

==== Non-research graduate schools ====
- Pacifica Graduate Institute
- Fielding Graduate University
- Santa Barbara Graduate Institute
- Southern California Institute of Law
- Santa Barbara & Ventura Colleges of Law

=== High schools ===
Secondary and junior high school students in Santa Barbara are served by the Santa Barbara Unified School District (SBUSD), which at its eastern extent encompasses all of Montecito and stretches along the coast to its westernmost point at El Capitán State Beach. Founded in 1875, Santa Barbara High School is the oldest secondary school in the county and served as the region's sole flagship high school until growing enrollment in the 1950's and 1960's led to the establishment of additional high schools. The following table details the district's five current high schools.

High Schools in the Santa Barbara Unified School District	Grades	Enrollment '23–'24	Founding Date	Notes
Alta Vista Alternative High School	9–12	134	2009	
Dos Pueblos High School	9–12	2075	1966	
La Cuesta Continuation High School	9–12	103	1966	
San Marcos High School	9–12	1943	1958	
Santa Barbara High School	9–12	2046	1875	

==== Junior high/middle schools ====
The following table details the four junior high schools of SBUSD.

Junior High Schools in the Santa Barbara Unified School District	Grades	Enrollment '23–'24	Founding Date	Notes
Goleta Valley Junior High School	7–8	736	1964	
La Colina Junior High School	7–8	893	1958	
La Cumbre Junior High School	7–8	450	1927	
Santa Barbara Junior High School	7–8	502	1924	

==== Primary schools ====
Primary school students from TK – 6 grades are served by the Santa Barbara Unified School District as well as four other separately organized elementary school districts in and immediately adjacent to Santa Barbara, including the Hope Elementary School District, Cold Spring Elementary School District, Montecito Union Elementary School District, and Goleta Union Elementary School District. Both Cold Spring and Montecito Union school districts oversee just a single elementary school respectively. The following table details all five elementary school district schools, as all feed into SBUSD.

Elementary School	Elementary School District	Grades	Enrollment '23–'24	Founding Date	Notes
Adams Elementary School	Santa Barbara Unified	TK – 6	491	1954	
Adelante Charter School	Santa Barbara Unified	TK – 6	306	2010	
Cleveland Elementary School	Santa Barbara Unified	TK – 6	253	1959	
Franklin Elementary School	Santa Barbara Unified	TK – 6	436	1899	
Harding University Partnership School	Santa Barbara Unified	TK – 6	378	1927	Certified as an International Baccalaureate Programme since 2012
McKinley Elementary School	Santa Barbara Unified	TK – 6	264	1906	Current building designed by Winsor Soule & John Frederic Murphy Architects and completed in 1931. Designated a City of Santa Barbara historic landmark in 1993.
Monroe Elementary School	Santa Barbara Unified	TK – 6	321	1958	
Peabody Charter School	Santa Barbara Unified	TK – 6	776	1928	
Roosevelt Elementary School	Santa Barbara Unified	TK – 6	477	1923	
Santa Barbara Charter School	Santa Barbara Unified	TK – 6	290	1993	
Santa Barbara Community Academy	Santa Barbara Unified	TK – 6	202	1999	
Washington Elementary School	Santa Barbara Unified	TK – 6	486	1953	
Hope Elementary School	Hope	K – 6	282	1891	Closed in 1977 due to declining enrollment. Reopened in 1997.
Monte Vista Elementary School	Hope	TK – 6	283	1966	
Vieja Valley Elementary School	Hope	TK – 6	306	1961	
Cold Spring Elementary School	Cold Spring	TK – 6	189	1894	
Montecito Union Elementary School	Montecito Union	TK – 6	353	1859	Founding date based on the City of Santa Barbara grant for the first one-room schoolhouse.
Brandon Elementary School	Goleta Union	TK – 6	443	1969	Closed in 1982 due to declining enrollment. Reopened in 1996.
El Camino Elementary School	Goleta Union	TK – 6	325	1965	
Ellwood Elementary School	Goleta Union	TK – 6	327	1929	
Foothill Elementary School	Goleta Union	TK – 6	397	1965	
Hollister Elementary School	Goleta Union	TK – 6	346	1962	
Isla Vista Elementary School	Goleta Union	TK – 6	433	1959	
Kellogg Elementary School	Goleta Union	TK – 6	395	1963	
La Patera Elementary School	Goleta Union	TK – 6	386	1963	
Mountain View Elementary School	Goleta Union	TK – 6	356	1966	

==== Private schools ====
There are a variety of private schools in and immediately adjacent to Santa Barbara, serving primary and secondary school students, including:

- Anacapa School, 7–12 grades
- Bishop Garcia Diego High School, 9–12 grades
- Cate School, 9–12 grades
- Laguna Blanca School, K–12 grades
- Santa Barbara Middle School, 6-9 grades
- Providence School, K–12 grades
- Crane Country Day School, K–8 grades
- Waldorf School of Santa Barbara, K–8 grades
- Montessori Center School, K–6 grades

== Media ==
=== Newspapers ===
The Santa Barbara area is served by several news outlets:

- The Santa Barbara News-Press, founded in 1868, is the area's oldest news outlet. It returned to daily digital publication in 2025 following a hiatus stemming from a 2023 bankruptcy. Prior to this, the paper received international attention and became the subject of the 2008 documentary, Citizen McCaw, due to controversial actions taken by its former owner, Wendy McCaw.
- The Santa Barbara Independent, founded in 1986, publishes a tabloid format print edition weekly on Thursdays and claims an audited print readership of 68,000. It also publishes as an online daily.
- VOICE Magazine (Voice SB), founded in 1994, publishes a tabloid format print edition weekly on Fridays and claims a total readership of over 51,000. It also publishes an e-edition online.

Santa Barbara is also served by two online-only news outlets:

- Edhat, a privately owned community news site founded in 2003.
- Noozhawk, an online news site founded in 2007

In addition, the business journal Pacific Coast Business Times covers Ventura, Santa Barbara, and San Luis Obispo counties.

=== Television ===
The following TV stations broadcast in the Santa Barbara market area:

- KEYT 3, an ABC/CBS/MNTV television affiliate;
- K10PV-D 10, an NBC television affiliate; repeater of KSBY 6, broadcast from San Luis Obispo
- KCOY 12, a Telemundo television affiliate; broadcast from Santa Maria
- KSBB-CD 17, a FOX television affiliate; license to Santa Barbara studios broadcast from KCOY in Santa Maria. Repeater of KKFX 24 San Luis Obispo. Also seen on cable channel 11.
- K26FT-D 26, a repeater for the secondary Los Angeles PBS member station KCET
- KTAS 33, a Diya TV affiliate; broadcast from San Luis Obispo
- KPMR 38, a Univision affiliate
- KBAB-LD 50, a rebroadcast of the primary Los Angeles PBS member station KOCE (licensed to Huntington Beach)
- TV Santa Barbara; Voice-17 (Public-access television) and Culture-71 Arts & Education (formerly owned by Cox Communications).

=== Radio ===
- KTMS (990 AM) News/Talk
- KZER (1250 AM) Regional Mexican
- KZSB (1290 AM) News/Talk
- KCLU (1340 AM) NPR"NPR for the California Coast" Rebroadcast of KCLU-FM Thousand Oaks
- KOSJ (1490 AM) Rhythmic Oldies
- KDRW (88.7 FM) NPR Rebroadcast KCRW 89.9 Santa Monica
- KSBX (89.5 FM) NPR Rebroadcast KCBX 90.1 FM San Luis Obispo
- KMRO (90.3 FM) Spanish Christian Radio Nueva Vida
- KCSB (91.9 FM) (Freeform) UCSB
- KJEE (92.9 FM) Alternative
- KDB (93.7 FM) Classical (Rebroadcast of KUSC 91.5 FM Los Angeles)
- KSPE (94.5 FM) Regional Mexican
- KLOS (95.5 FM) Classic Rock broadcasting from Los Angeles
- KLSB (97.5 FM) Contemporary Christian K-LOVE
- KDAR (98.3 FM) Christian broadcasting from Oxnard
- KTYD (99.9 FM) Classic Rock
- KHAY (100.7 FM) Country broadcasting from Ventura
- KSBL (101.7 FM) Adult Contemporary which markets itself as KLITE and is owned by Rincon Broadcasting.
- KRUZ (103.3 FM) Classic Hits, formerly CHR-Rhythmic station KVYB. It broadcasts from La Cumbre Peak at an altitude of 3,000 feet (910 m) and can be heard in San Diego despite a distance of 200 miles (320 km) because it propagates across the ocean.
- KRAZ (105.9 FM) Country
- KIST (107.7 FM) Regional Mexican

Some Los Angeles radio stations can be heard, although somewhat faintly due to the 85-mile (140 km) distance. Santa Monica-based NPR radio station KCRW can be heard in Santa Barbara at 106.9 MHz, and San Luis Obispo-based NPR station KCBX at 89.5 FM and 90.9 FM. The California Lutheran University-operated NPR station KCLU (102.3 FM, 1340 AM), based in Thousand Oaks in Ventura County, also serves Santa Barbara and has reporters covering the city. The only non-commercial radio station based in Santa Barbara is KCSB-FM (91.9 FM), owned by the University of California, Santa Barbara, which uses it as part of its educational mission.

== Transportation ==
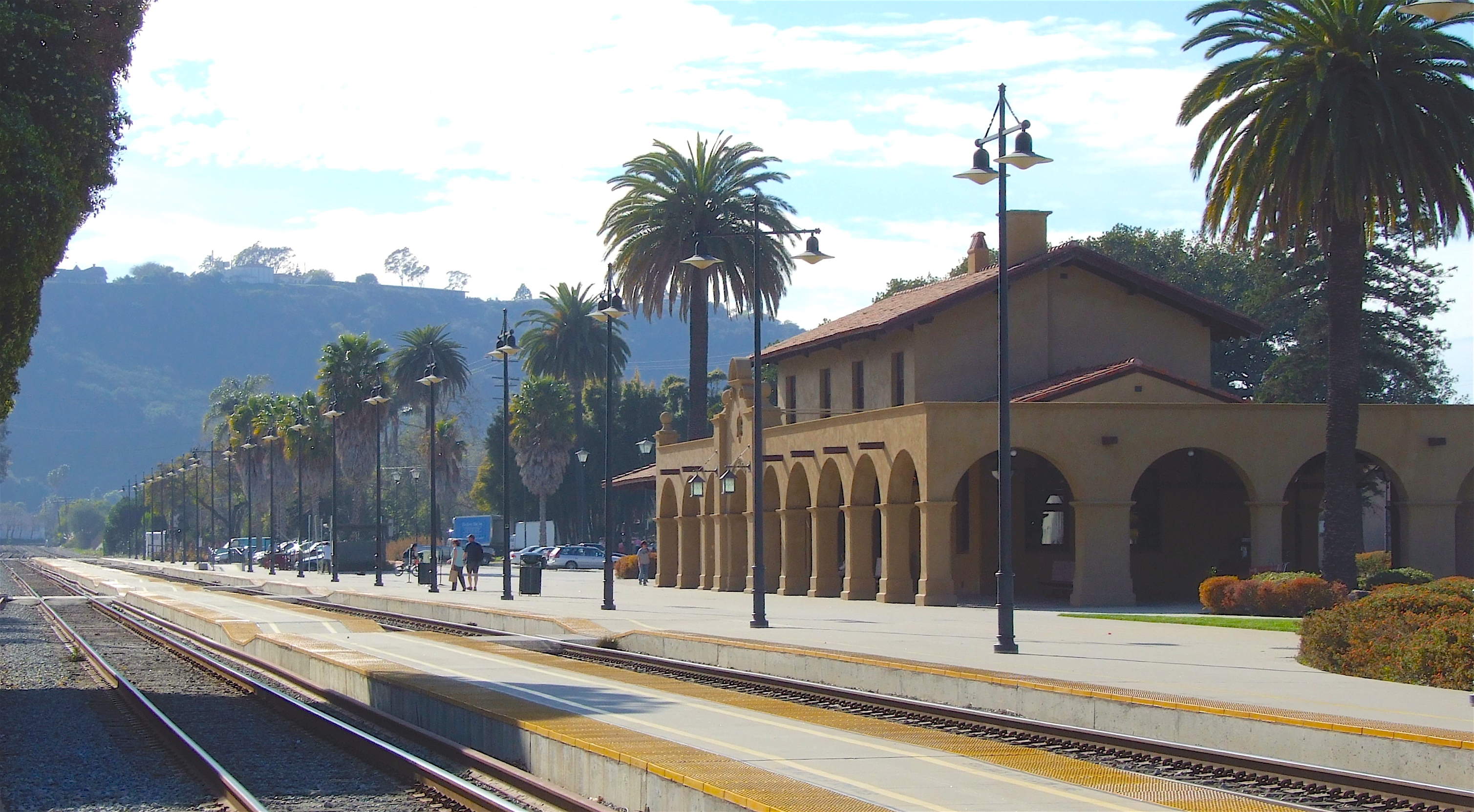
Santa Barbara station, built in 1902 by the Southern Pacific Railroad in the Spanish Mission Revival style

For intercity travel, Santa Barbara is bisected by U.S. Route 101, a highway that links the city to the rest of the Central Coast region, San Francisco to the north, and Los Angeles to the southeast. Santa Barbara Municipal Airport offers commercial air service. Santa Barbara Aviation provides locally based private jet charter aircraft. Amtrak offers rail service through the Coast Starlight and Pacific Surfliner trains at the Santa Barbara station on State Street, and another stop at Goleta Station.

The Santa Barbara Metropolitan Transit District (MTD) provides local bus service across the city. Greyhound bus lines provide service to downtown Santa Barbara. Electric shuttles operated by MTD ferry tourists and shoppers up and down lower State Street and to the wharf. The Clean Air Express bus offers connections to Lompoc and Santa Maria. Ventura Intercity Service Transit Authority (VISTA) bus service offers connections south to Ventura and west to Goleta. Santa Barbara Airbus offers daily service to/from LAX from downtown Santa Barbara, Carpinteria and Goleta.

Santa Barbara has an extensive network of bike trails and other resources for cyclists, and the League of American Bicyclists recognizes Santa Barbara as a Silver Level city. Santa Barbara Car Free promotes visiting and exploring the area without the use of a car.

Often chosen as a winter training location for professional cycling teams and snowbirds, Santa Barbara has cycling routes and several climbs, including Gibraltar Road and Old San Marcos/Painted Cave. A bike path and route connect the University of California, Santa Barbara to the downtown area, passing through Goleta and Hope Ranch. Bike rentals are a way for tourists to view Santa Barbara and the surrounding area. In 2009, the Santa Barbara-Santa Maria-Goleta metropolitan statistical area (MSA) ranked as the sixth highest in the United States for the percentage of commuters who biked to work (4 percent).

From 1875 until 1929, a streetcar network existed in Santa Barbara.

== Sister cities ==
Santa Barbara's sister cities are:

- Miraflores, Lima, Peru (2023)
- Kotor, Kotor Municipality, Montenegro (2009)
- Patras, Western Greece, Greece (2010)
- Puerto Vallarta, Jalisco, Mexico (1973)
- Toba, Mie, Japan (1966)
- Weihai, Shandong, China (1993)
- (Ukraine) (Russia) Yalta, Crimea

== In popular culture ==
Several films have been fully or partially set in Santa Barbara, including:

- What Price Hollywood?, a 1932 pre-Code Hollywood drama
- A Date with Judy, a 1948 MGM musical film
- The Graduate, a 1967 American romantic comedy-drama
- The Gumball Rally, a 1976 American comedy
- Cutter's Way, a 1981 American neo-noir thriller
- Demolition Man, a 1993 American science fiction action film
- Steal Big Steal Little, a 1995 American comedy
- My Favorite Martian, a 1999 American science fiction comedy film, which was filmed on location
- Cruel Intentions 3, a 2004 direct-to-video teen drama film
- Alpha Dog, 2006, an American crime drama based on the true story of the kidnapping and murder of Nicholas Markowitz at the hands of Jesse James Hollywood.
- It's Complicated, a 2009 American romantic comedy
- Santa Barbara, a 2014 South Korean romance
- 20th Century Women, a 2016 American comedy-drama
- Psych 2: Lassie Come Home, a 2020 American made-for-television comedy

Psych was set in Santa Barbara, though White Rock, British Columbia, Canada, was used as the filming location.

Santa Barbara, the popular soap opera set locally, aired on NBC from 1984 to 1993.

The TV series Owen Marshall, Counselor at Law was set in Santa Barbara.

An American Family, which is known as the first American reality television show, chronicled the daily lives of a family living in Santa Barbara.

A portion of the 2020 video game The Last of Us Part II takes place in Santa Barbara.

In 2022, shooting began on season 4 of the reality TV series Love Island, which is set at Dos Pueblos Ranch, a 214-acre ranch west of Goleta.

Santa Barbara appears multiple times in the American animated series BoJack Horseman.

== See also ==
- City of Santa Barbara Historic Landmarks
- List of mayors of Santa Barbara, California
- Santa Barbara City Fire Department
- USNS Mission Santa Barbara (T-AO-131)
- USS Santa Barbara
