= Gould Park =

Park in Santa Barbara, California, United States

Coordinates: 34.465195°N 119.6513649°W

Gould Park is a public park located in Santa Barbara, California, United States. A gift from Charles W. and Clara H. Gould in June 1926, the 360+ acre park has not been developed by the city since its acquisition.

In 1932 the Southern California Edison company was permitted to construct and maintain a transmission line over the north end of the park. In December of the same year, the Park Commission discussed developing the land for recreational use, however the idea was dropped because only a small part of it was usable.
