= Elings Park =

Park in California, United States

Coordinates: 34.414297°N 119.735467°W

- Interactive map of Elings Park
- Type: Nonprofit park
- Location: Santa Barbara, California, United States
- Area: 230 acres (0.93 km^{2})
- Opened: 1985
- Owner: Elings Park Foundation
- Operator: Elings Park Foundation
- Status: Open
- Facilities: Sports fields, hiking and biking trails, playgrounds, event venues
- Website: https://elingspark.org/

Elings Park (formerly Las Positas Friendship Park) is a 230-acre (0.93 km^{2}) non-profit park located in Santa Barbara, California east of Las Positas Road and south of U.S. Highway 101. It is the largest privately funded park in America. The park consists of sports fields, hiking and biking trails, playgrounds, wedding/special event venues, and landscaped walkways. The park is a hub for mountain biking, youth sports, paragliding, and other outdoor activities. Elings Park International Raceway is the only dedicated radio control (R/C) off-road course in Santa Barbara and Elings Park BMX Raceway is the only dedicated BMX track in Santa Barbara as well.

The north side of the park is built on top of the old, now-closed Santa Barbara City dump. The park's grand opening was in 1985, and it has changed names several times: at first it was "Las Positas Park"; in 1991 it became "Las Positas Friendship Park"; and in 1999, in honor of more than two million dollars given by Virgil Elings and his family, the park was renamed "Elings Park."
