= City of Santa Barbara Historic Landmarks =

The City of Santa Barbara Historic Landmarks consist of buildings and sites designated by the City of Santa Barbara, California, as historic landmarks. The city also maintains a list of Structures of Merit, a Historic Resources Inventory, and a list of designated and potential Historic Districts.

A map displaying the locations of Santa Barbara's designated historic landmarks can be viewed by clicking "OpenStreetMap" in the template found to the right below.

== Santa Barbara Historic Landmarks ==
Landmarks highlighted in blue are also listed on the National Register of Historic Places.

Name	Image	Location	Built	Designated	Description
Orena Adobes		27-39 E De la Guerra St. 34.426360°N 119.692150°W	1849, 1858	1960	
Lugo Adobe/Meridian Studios		112-116 E De la Guerra St.	c. 1830, 1922, 1923, 1925	1960	
Tree of Light		100 W Carrillo St.	c. 1878	1977	
Faith Mission/Hotel Savoy		409 State St. 34.416°N 119.69475°W	1889, 1988	1978	
Southern Pacific Railroad Station (Amtrak Station)		209 State St. 34.413708°N 119.692827°W	1905	1980	Passenger rail station in built in the Spanish Mission Revival style, added to NRHP 2006
Railway Express Agency		224 Chapala St.	1906	1980	Contributing building to Amtrak Railroad Site
Upham Hotel and Annex		1404 De la Vina St.34.423400°N 119.709244°W	1872, 1900	1980	Italianate Style, designed by Peter J. Barber
Alameda Plaza Bandstand		100 E Micheltorena St.34.427414°N 119.706081°W	1888	1980	
Lobero Theatre		33 E Canon Perdido St.34.421670°N 119.699987°W	1924	1981	Designed by George Washington Smith and Lutah Maria Riggs
Saint Vincent's School and Orphanage/Knights of Columbus Hall		925 De la Vina St.34.418775°N 119.704116°W	1874-1875, 1983	1981	Italianate Style, added to NRHP 1982
Buenaventura Pico Adobe		920 Anacapa St.	c.1820	1982	
Santa Barbara Courthouse		1120 Anacapa St. 34.424410°N 119.702610°W	1927-29	1982	Added to NRHP 1981, designated as a National Historic Landmark 2005
El Cuartel		122 E Canon Perdido St.	1788	1982	
Canedo Adobe		123 E Canon Perdido St.	1788	1982	
Hill–Carrillo Adobe		11-15 E Carrillo St.	1825-26	1982	Added to NRHP 1986; also California Historical Landmark (#721)
Mortimer Cook House		1407 Chapala St.34.424228°N 119.708650°W	1872	1982	Italianate house designed by Peter J. Barber. Now the Institute of World Culture
Former Saint Mark's Episcopal Church		2020 Chapala St.34.430506°N 119.716306°W	1875	1982	
Charles Caldwell Park Watering Trough and Fountain		1 Hot Springs Rd.	1911-12	1982	
Moreton Bay Fig Tree and Park		101 W Montecito St.34.413755°N 119.694015°W	c. 1874, 1877	1982	
1) Trussell-Winchester Adobe and 2) Judge Fernald Residence		412 - 414 W Montecito St.	1) 1854 and 2) 1862, 1880, 1962	1982	
"Historic" Adobe		715 Santa Barbara St.	c. 1825	1982	
Covarrubias Adobe		715 Santa Barbara St.	1817, 1940	1982	
Rochin Adobe		820 Santa Barbara St.	1856, c. 1900	1982	
Miranda Adobe and Guard House		802 Anacapa St.	Various	1983	Adobe portion only
El Paseo and Casa de la Guerra		808-818 State St., 813-819 Anacapa St., and 9-25 E. de la Guerra St.	1911-24; 1928-29	1983	
Botiller-Grand Adobe		1023 Bath St.	1844	1983	
Hunt-Stambach House		821 Coronel	1873-74	1983	Italianate style house designed by Peter J. Barber
Jimmy's Oriental Gardens and Chung Family home		126 E Canon Perdido Street	1946	September 19, 2018	Both a commercial and residential property, the front is a restaurant and the rear served as a two-story residence. The building stands out because it's made with brick rather than stucco.
Casa De la Guerra		11-19 E De la Guerra St.	1819-27	1983	
Italiante Commercial Building		25 E De la Guerra St.	1860	1983	Italianate Commercial Building, Stuccoed Brick
Santiago De la Guerra Adobe		110 E De la Guerra St.	c. 1812	1983	
Arrelanes-Kirk Adobe		421 E Figueroa St.	c. 1860	1983	
Refugio Cordero Adobe		906 Garden St.	c. 1855, 1969	1983	
Gonzales-Ramirez Adobe		835 Laguna St. 34.424240°N 119.695980°W	1825, 1923, 1956	1983	Adobe home built in 1825 and occupied by the Gonzales family until 1923; designated as a National Historic Landmark in 1970; now houses Randall House Rare Books
Mission Santa Barbara		2201 Laguna St. 34.437930°N 119.713980°W	1786, 1815–1820, 1833, 1925	1983	Spanish mission founded by Padre Fermín Lasuén in 1786, designated as a National Historic Landmark in 1960
Arlington Theatre		1317 State St.	1930–31, 1976	1983	Designed by Edwards and Plunkett
Jack's Trough (aka Courtney Fountain)		1790 Sycamore Canyon Rd.	1926	1983	
Santa Barbara Junior High School		721 E Cota St.	1932	1985	Designed by San Francisco-based architecture firm, W. H. Weeks.
La Cumbre Junior High School		2255 Modoc Rd.	1927-28	1986	Designed by San Francisco-based architecture firm, W. H. Weeks.
Janssens–Orella–Birk Building		1029-1031 State St.	c. 1859, 1915, 1927	1986	Added to NRHP in 1987
Little Granada Residences		734 E Anapamu St., 725 E. Figueroa St., 1103-1131 N Nopal St.	1921-22	1988	
Plaza del Mar Band Shell		100 Castillo St.	1919	1990	
Moose-Sturgeon House		1809 Chapala St.	1888	1990	Queen Anne Style House
El Caserio (lane)		924 Garden St.	1930-1937, 1954	1990	
Charles Pressley House/Adobe		2210 Hudson Dr.	1924	1990	
Ambassador Park		205 W Mason St.	c 1902	1990	
White House Building (aka Alexander Building)		717-719 State St.	1896, 1925, 1934	1990	
Nardo Building		922 State St.	1887, 1925	1990	
SBa-52 Archaeological Site Prehistoric		Restricted	Prehistoric	1991	
Hezekiah G. and Pearl Chase Home		2012 Anacapa St.	1904	1991	
Frothingham House		232 E Los Olivos St.	1922	1991	Spanish Colonial Revival Style
Street Lamps		3800 Lincoln Rd.	1925	1992	
Los Banos del Mar Pool		401 Shoreline Dr.	1931, 1992	1992	
Simpson House		121 E Arrellaga St.	1874-75	1993	
Recreation Center and Gymnasium		110-114 E Carrillo St.	1913, 1926	1993	
McKinley Elementary School and portion of grounds		350 Loma Alta Dr.	1931	1993	
Girl Scout House		1836-1838 San Andres St.	1923	1993	
Clark Estate St. "Bellosguardo"		1407 E Cabrillo Blvd.	1932-36	1994	
Santa Barbara Post Office		836 Anacapa St. 34.421669°N 119.698730°W	1936-37	1995	Mission Revival-influenced Art Deco design; designed by Pasadena architect Reginald Davis Johnson; added to NHRP 1985
Cota-Knox House		914-916 Anacapa St.	1871	1995	
Naval Reserve Building		113 Harbor Way	1940-1942, 1997	1995	
Carl Oscar Borg House		403 Loma Alta Dr.	1918	1995	
Doremus Stone Pine trees		300-800 Blocks E Anapamu St.	1908, 1929	1997	79 mature trees
Fernald Eucalyptus Tree		Santa Barbara St.	c. 1890	1997	
National Guard Armory		700-730 E Canon Perdido St.	1938	1998	Main building & rose garden
Former Flying A Film Studios - Green Room		34 W Mission St.	1913	1998	
Mission Historical Park		415 Plaza Rubio	192, 1956	1998	
Riviera Street Car Shelter		2000 Alameda Padre Serra	1913	1999	
City Hall and Pepper Tree		735 Anacapa St.	1924	2000	
Moody Sisters Cottage		1086 Coast Village Rd.34.421733°N 119.648670°W	1932	2001	
Calder Residence		206-208 Equestrian34.426139°N 119.702429°W	1874	2001	Queen Anne
Franchesca De la Guerra/Dibblee Residence		333 Junipero Plaza	1909	2002	
Vaughan Residence		316 E Los Olivos St.	1914	2002	Spanish Colonial Revival Style
Ebbetts Hall		2020 Alameda Padre Serra	1928-29	2004	
Grand Staircase/Quadrangle Building		2030 Alameda Padre Serra	1913	2004	
Furse Hall		2040 Alameda Padre Serra Furse Hall	1927	2004	
Riviera Campus		2020-2050 Alameda Padre Serra	1912-1929	2005	
Santa Barbara High School		700 E Anapamu St. 34.4291637°N 119.6940235°W	1924, 1934	2005	Main Building (1924)and Figueroa St. Ticket Booth (1934). Designed by San Francisco-based architecture firm, W. H. Weeks.
Queen Anne Residence		215 W Valerio St.	1887	2005	
D'Alfonso House		1710 Mira Vista Ave.	1930	2007	
The Huning Mansion		1732 Santa Barbara St.	1904	2007	
Frederick H. Booth House		105 Ontare Hills Ln.	1939	2011	
Cottage Hospital Morton Bay Fig Tree		320 W Pueblo St.	c. 1919	2011	
Granada Building		1214 State St.	1924	2011	
Central Library, Faulkner Gallery		40 E Anapamu St.	1917, 1930	2012	
Five Corymbia (Eucalyptus) Trees		40 E Anapamu St.	c. 1930	2012	
St. Anthony's Seminary and Grounds		2300 Garden St.	1901-1949	2012	
El Encanto Hotel Historic District		800 Alvarado Place	1913-1930	2013	
Veterans Memorial Building		112 W Cabrillo Blvd.	1927	2013	Remodeled in 1937 in the Spanish Colonial Revival style from a 1927 building, added to NRHP 2016
Stark House		1709 Overlook Ln.	1928	2013	
The Hodges House		2112 Santa Barbara St.	1921	2013	Italian Mediterranean Style
The Masonic Temple		16 E. Carrillo St.34.421944°N 119.701215°W	1924	2014	Santa Barbara Masonic Temple, Lodge 192 F&AM
Santa Barbara Club		1105 Chapala St.	1904	2014	Added to NRHP in 2019
Unitarian Church		1535 Santa Barbara St.34.428849°N 119.707182°W	1930	2014	
Santa Barbara News-Press building		715 Anacapa St.	1922	2015	Designed by George Washington Smith
Peter Grant House		1804 Cleveland Avenue	1896	2015	Queen Anne style
Mont Joie Residence		931 Las Alturas Rd.	1928	2015	
San Marcos Building		1129 State St.	1926	2015	
First Church of Christ, Scientist		120 E Valerio St.	1931	2015	
Joseph Knowles Mural		38 W Victoria Street	1958	2015	
"The Olives"		2121 Garden St.	1888, 1906	2016	Craftsman Style
Rattlesnake Canyon Bridge		1819 Las Canoas Road	1919	2016	Sandstone by mason Peter Poole, added to NRHP 2017
Dolores/Notre Dame School		33 E Micheltorena St.	1926	2016	
George Edwards House		1721 Stanta Barbara St.	1887	2016	Queen Anne Style designed by Thomas Nixon
Our Lady of Sorrows Church		33 E Sola	1929	2016	
Santa Barbara County National Bank		1000 State St.	1919	2016	Spanish Colonial Revival style designed by Myron Hunt
Ygnacio House		214 E De la Guerra St.	c. 1875	2017	
Arnoldi's Restaurant		600 Olive St.	1940	2017	
Kem Weber Building		1301-03 State St.	1951	2017	
Margaret Baylor Inn/Lobero Building		924 Anacapa St.	1926-27	2018	Designed by Julia Morgan
Alhecama Theatre		215A E Canon Perdido St.	1925	2018	
Live Oak Dairy		901 N. Milpas	1939	2018	
Trinity Episcopal Church		1500 State St.	1912	2019	

== See also ==
- National Register of Historic Places listings in Santa Barbara County, California
- California Historical Landmarks in Santa Barbara County, California
