= Pyron =

Pyron may refer to:

- Pyron (surname), a surname
- Pyron (material), an ablative material used in spaceflight reentry
- Pyron (Darkstalkers), a fictional character in the Darkstalkers series
