= 1915 Cal Poly Mustangs football team =

American college football season

1915 Cal Poly Mustangs football
- Conference: Independent
- Record: 1–0–1
- Head coach: D .W. Schlosser (1st season)

The 1915 Cal Poly Mustangs football team represented California Polytechnic School, now California Polytechnic State University, in the 1915 college football season. In its inaugural season, the team was led by D. W. Schlosser and compiled a record of 1–0–1. Both games were played against Santa Barbara High School

Cal Poly was a two-year school until 1941.

== Schedule ==
Date	Opponent	Site	Result
October 2	at Santa Barbara High School	Santa Barbara, CA	T 6–6
November 6	Santa Barbara High School	San Luis Obispo, CA	W 17–14
