= Rod Phillips (actor) =

American actor and model (1960–1993)

- Born: Gregory Leslie Patton; August 23, 1960; El Centro, California, U.S.
- Died: May 24, 1993 (aged 32); West Hollywood, California, U.S.
- Other names: Ron Greer
- Education: Santa Barbara High School
- Alma mater: Paris Junior College
- Occupations: Actor; Model; Jeweler
- Years active: 1982–1993
- Agent: Falcon Studios
- Partner: Darras Robert Pyron (1982–1985)

Rod Phillips (born Gregory Leslie Patton; August 23, 1960 – May 24, 1993) was an American adult gay film actor and jeweler who appeared in gay pornographic films from 1982 to 1993. He was recognized for his "All-American" athletic physique and blond hair, becoming a prominent figure during the "Golden Age" of gay cinema.

== Early life and education ==
Gregory Leslie Patton was born in El Centro, California. He developed a fascination with jewelry making at a young age, learning basic gem polishing and pearl knotting by age 12. He graduated from Santa Barbara High School in 1978.

Following high school, Patton moved to Paris, Texas, to study jewelry making and gemology at Paris Junior College. He briefly lived in Midland, Texas, before returning to Santa Barbara in 1980.

== Career ==
=== Adult film and modeling ===
In late 1982, Patton met adult film star Lee Ryder at the Boom-Boom Room in Laguna Beach. The two began a relationship, and at Ryder's urging, Patton entered the adult industry under the stage name Rod Phillips. He was also occasionally credited as Ron Greer.

Phillips was noted for his athletic build and "All-American" appearance, which led to extensive modeling work for Modernismo Publications and other publishers. He appeared in magazines such as Honcho, Jock, Torso, and Just Men.

He retired from the industry in the mid-1980s but made two separate comebacks, once in 1990 and again in 1993. During his 1990 return, he briefly dated and performed with Joey Stefano.

=== Jewelry vocation ===
Outside of film, Phillips was a skilled jeweler. He worked for Diamonds on Rodeo Drive in Beverly Hills for several years. In his final year, due to declining health, he took a freelance position at The Gauntlet, a famous body piercing boutique in West Hollywood, because it was within walking distance of his home.

== Personal life ==
Phillips was in a long-term relationship with Lee Ryder until approximately 1985. In 1992, he was diagnosed with HIV-related lymphatic prostate cancer. Despite undergoing extensive chemotherapy, he continued to maintain a fitness regimen until early 1993.

== Death ==
Phillips died on May 24, 1993, at Cedars-Sinai Medical Center in West Hollywood at the age of 32. While rumors of suicide by overdose circulated within the industry, his death was officially attributed to rapid health decline from AIDS-related complications. He is memorialized on The AIDS Memorial.

== Filmography ==
=== Film ===
Year	Title	Role	Notes
1983	Winner Takes All	Rod	Debut
1983	Winner Takes All: High Voltage	Rod	
1983	Spokes	Ron Greer	
1984	The Biggest One I Ever Saw!	Handsome Guy	
1984	Giants 1	Jack	
1984	Men in Films: Too Hot for Cable	Steve	
1985	Boys Town: Going West Hollywood	The Model	
1985	Windows	Rod	
1986	Daddies: Hot Shots 7	Jeff	
1986	Kink: Hot Shots 6	Lover Boy	
1987	Too Big for His Britches	Blonde	
1987	Men & Films	Stephen	
1987	The Best of Blonds 1: Stroke 1	Blonde	
1988	Bare Tales	Matt	
1990	Guess Who's Cuming?	Rod	
1990	Hard Steal	Ret. P.I. Tyler 'Ty' Hartman	
1990	Plunge	Rod	
1992	The Best of Joey Stefano	Rod Phillips	
1993	Hologram	Jeremy	
1994	Make Mine Jizz, Hard Hunks Collection	Chris	Posthumous release
2006	The Big Surprise	Rod	Posthumous release
2007	Falcon Studios 35th Anniversary Limited Edition	Rod	Posthumous release
2008	The Best of Lee Ryder	Rod	Posthumous release
2008	The Best of Leo Ford vs. Kurt Marshall	Rod	Posthumous release
2009	Best of the 1980s	Rod	Posthumous release
2010	Rites of Initiation	Rod	Posthumous release
2011	Grudge Fuck	Rod	Posthumous release
2013	Riveting Raw Threeways!, Falcon Bareback 12	Rod	Posthumous release
2015	Deep Raw Delivery: Falcon Bareback 24	Rod	Posthumous release
2021	Falcon Icons: The 1980s	Rod	Posthumous release
