= Santa Barbara Junior High School =

Location
- 721 E Cota Street; Santa Barbara, California 93103; 34°25′35″N 119°41′18.6″W

Information
- Type: Public
- Established: 1924
- School district: Santa Barbara Unified School District
- Grades: 7–8
- Mascot: Condors
- Website: sbjh.sbunified.org

Santa Barbara Junior High School is a public junior high school in Santa Barbara, California, established in 1924. It is the oldest of four junior high schools in the Santa Barbara Unified School District, and serves students in grades 7-8.

The school's current main building, constructed in Spanish Colonial Revival style, opened in 1932 and was designated a City of Santa Barbara Historic landmark on March 26, 1985. The school is home to the Marjorie Luke Theatre, a community events venue jointly overseen by the Santa Barbara Unified School district and the 501(c)(3) non-profit Santa Barbara Community Youth Performing Arts Center.

The Santa Barbara Junior High School library also hosts a historic mural completed in 1934 as part of the New Deal Federal Art Project, painted by American West painter, Douglass Ewell Parshall.

Located in Santa Barbara's Eastside neighborhood, Santa Barbara Junior High School has been recognized by the National Trust for Historic Preservation as an example of a historic, centrally located community school to which many students are able to walk from home.

== History ==
The Santa Barbara School District was founded in 1866 and utilized several converted buildings around the city as schoolhouses until the completion of Lincoln School at the corner of Anacapa and Cota streets in 1871. While the high school program was founded in 1875, students of all grade levels would continue to be taught at Lincoln school until at least 1896, when the high school moved to the former site of Santa Barbara College at the corner of Estado (present-day State Street) and Anapamu streets. In 1902 the high school would move again to a building on the corner of De la Vina and Anapamu streets, during which time it is likely at least some junior high grades were taught there as well. In 1924 the high school program would move to its current location at 700 East Anapamu Street where it taught only 10-12 grades until the inclusion of 9th grade in 1981.

This physical separation of the junior high and high school divisions in 1924 would precipitate the formal administrative establishment of Santa Barbara Junior High School the same year. The building at De La Vina and Anapamu streets, now housing only Santa Barbara Junior High School, would be significantly damaged in the 1925 Santa Barbara earthquake. Despite this, the junior high would remain there until the official opening of its current campus in 1932.

The current Santa Barbara Junior High School building, along with Santa Barbara High School and La Cumbre Junior High School were all designed by noted San Francisco architecture firm, W. H. Weeks. These, along with McKinley Elementary School, designed by Winsor Soule & John Frederic Murphy Architects have been cited as "architectural masterpieces" of Spanish Colonial Revival style, by American Political Scientist Lanny Ebenstein. All four schools have been designated City of Santa Barbara historic landmarks; Santa Barbara Junior High School received the designation on March 26, 1985.

In 2021 a new multipurpose gym was constructed in place of an existing one which had not been part of the original 1930's construction.

== Leadership ==
The current Principal is Daniel Dupont, who was hired in 2022. Dupont previously served a combined eight years as Assistant Principal of Curriculum during positions at Santa Barbara High School and El Dorado High School. He holds a Bachelor of Arts in Spanish from UCSB and a Master of Science in Educational Leadership from Cal State Fullerton.

== The Marjorie Luke Theatre ==
The Marjorie Luke Theatre is the primary theatre and performing arts space of Santa Barbara Junior High School. Following community efforts to renovate the theatre in 2002, a unique governance structure was formed between the school district and an independent 501(c)(3) non-profit, Santa Barbara Community Youth Performing Arts Center, set up to oversee the theatre. In addition to school-related functions, the 808-seat theatre hosts dozens of independent performances and events annually.

The theatre is named for former theatre director, Marjorie Luke, who taught at the school for over 40 years.

== Demographics ==
Santa Barbara Junior High School typically serves approximately 450-650 students across both grades, in a given school year.

| School Year | 7th Grade | 8th Grade | Total |
|---|---|---|---|
| 2023-2024 | 249 | 253 | 502 |
| 2022-2023 | 251 | 309 | 560 |
| 2021-2022 | 311 | 319 | 630 |

== Notable alumni ==
- Diana M. Holland, Retired Major General in the United States Army
- Julio Bortolazzo, Pioneer of American higher education
