= SBSD =

SBSD or S.B.S.D. may refer to:

- Santa Barbara Unified School District
- San Bernardino County Sheriff's Department
- Security-based swap dealer
