= Goleta Valley Junior High School =

Goleta Valley Jr. High School
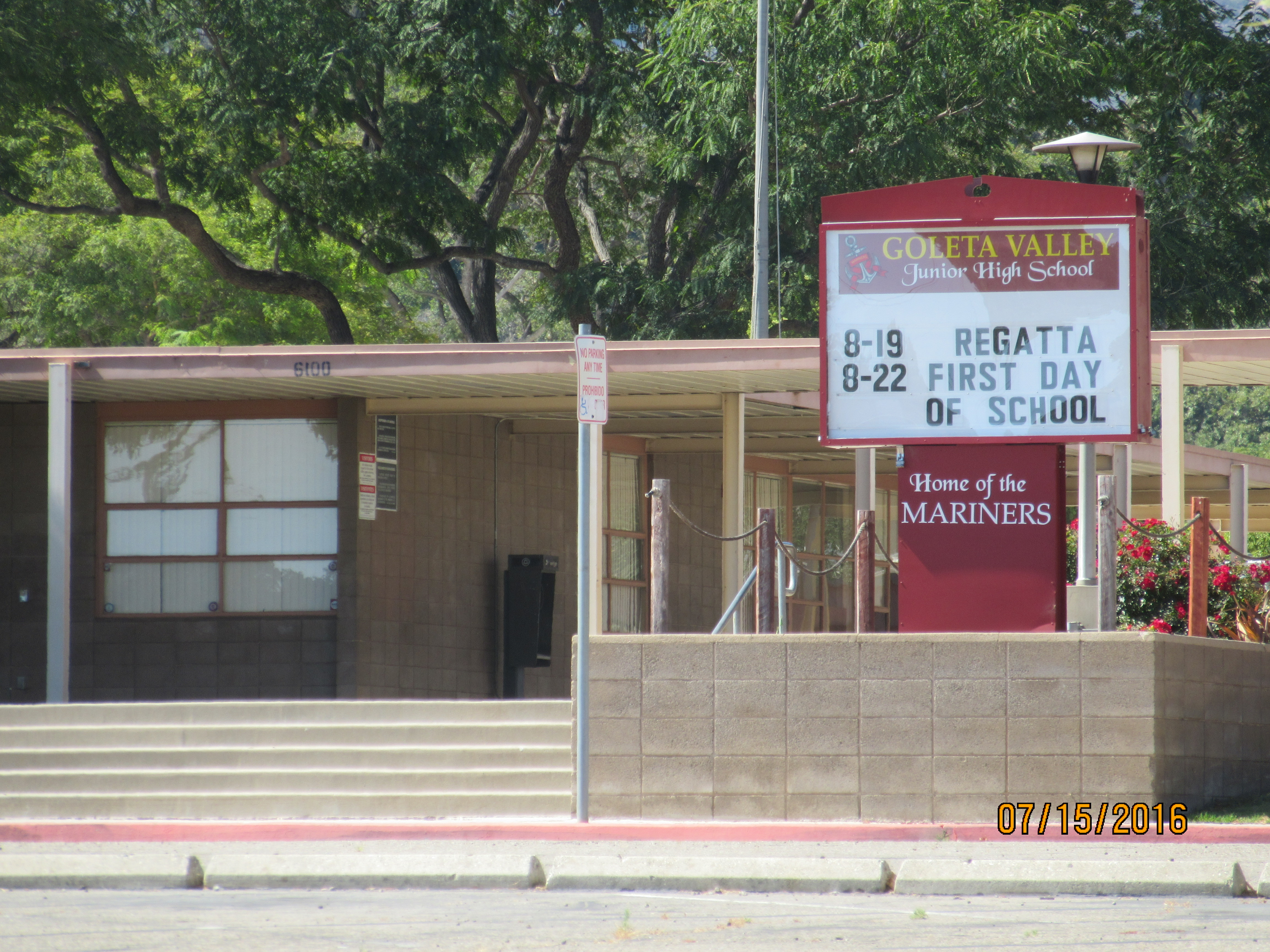
- The front entrance to Goleta Valley Junior High

Location
- 6100 Stow Canyon Road. Goleta, CA; United States; 34°27′2″N 119°50′5″W

Information
- Type: Public
- Established: 1964
- School district: Santa Barbara Unified School District
- Principal: Clanci Chiu
- Grades: 7-8
- Enrollment: 776 (2019-20)
- Language: English, Spanish
- Color
- Slogan: S.A.I.L (Safety, Accountability, Inclusive, Learning)
- Nickname: Mariners
- USNWR ranking: 1. 392 in California Schools
- Website: gvjh.sbunified.org

Goleta Valley Junior High School is a public junior high school in Goleta, California, just northwest of Santa Barbara, California. It serves a student body of approximately 785 students in 7-8 grades, and employs roughly fifty-five teachers as part of the Santa Barbara School Districts. Goleta Valley Junior High School ("GVJH" or simply "GV") is a National Blue Ribbon School.

== Classes ==
Classes at Goleta Valley Junior High can consist of zero period, to seventh period. Students at GVJH, are required to take the classes of: Social Studies, Mathematics, English, Science, Health, and Physical Education. Oftentimes, students at GVJH have their chosen elective, coincide with their Health class. This means that students may have a full semester with their chosen elective, then have the required Health course for the next semester, or vice versa. Students at GVJH have the ability to take a zero period, where members can take an extra year-long elective. Students have the choices of: Visual Arts, Sculpture & 3D Art, Leadership, Spanish 1, Spanish 2, Theater 1, Theater 2, Chorus, Beginning Band, Advanced Band, Jazz Band, Orchestra, Office/Library Aide, Industrial Tech, Wood and Construction, Intro to Video/TV Production, Beginning Coding, and AVID. Students also have the ability to take a 7th period class, such as: Stagecraft, among other electives.

== Notable alumni ==
- Asmita Kumar, scientist
