= Pyron (surname) =

Pyron is a surname. Notable people with the surname include:

- Charles L. Pyron (1819–1869), American soldier
- Darras Robert Pyron (1959–1991), American actor, model and floral designer
- Zach Pyron (born 2003), American college football player
