= Alan O. Ebenstein =

American political scientist (born 1959)

- Born: May 28, 1959 (age 67); Princeton, New Jersey

Academic background
- Education: Santa Barbara High School; University of California, Santa Barbara; London School of Economics

Alan Oliver (Lanny) Ebenstein (born May 28, 1959) is an American political scientist, economist, educator, and author, known best for his biographical works on prominent economists including Friedrich Hayek and Milton Friedman. He is a lecturer at University of California, Santa Barbara.

== Biography ==
Ebenstein was born in Princeton, New Jersey, to William Ebenstein (1910–1976), a noted political scientist, and Ruth Ebenstein. He graduated from Santa Barbara High School in 1977, where he was elected Associated Student Body President. He obtained his BA at the University of California, Santa Barbara, in 1982, and his PhD at the London School of Economics in 1988.

After his graduation, Ebenstein was an instructor at Antioch University from 1990 to 1996. In 1992, he ran unsuccessfully as the Republican nominee for California's 35th State Assembly District. From 1990 to 1998 he was a member of the Santa Barbara Board of Education. Since 2005, he has been a visitor and lecturer in economic thought and history at the University of California, Santa Barbara. In 2007 he ran unsuccessfully for mayor of Santa Barbara.

Ebenstein is well known in the Santa Barbara community as a supporter and historian of public education. He signed seven ballot arguments between 2008 and 2016 on behalf of school bonds and school parcel taxes in support of the Santa Barbara Unified School District and the Santa Barbara Community College District.

== Author ==
In 1991, Ebenstein co-edited the 5th edition of Great Political Thinkers: Plato to the Present, which was first published in 1951 by his father. Since the 1990s, he has written a series of biographies on economists, starting with Edwin Cannan in 1997, Friedrich Hayek in 2001, and Milton Friedman in 2007.

In 2015, Ebenstein published the highly acclaimed book, Chicagonomics: The Evolution of Chicago Free Market Economics. Chicagonomics was named an "Editors' Choice" selection by the New York Times Book Review and The Economist concluded its review of the book stating Chicagonomics "deserves to be read by all those with an interest in economic policy". Ebenstein's works have been translated into Chinese, Japanese, Italian, Spanish, Romanian, Polish, and Vietnamese.

== Selected publications ==
- Ebenstein, William; Ebenstein, Alan O., eds. (1991). Great Political Thinkers: Plato to the Present (5th ed.). Fort Worth: Harcourt.
- Ebenstein, Alan O. (1991). The Greatest Happiness Principle: An Examination of Utilitarianism.
- Ebenstein, Alan O. (1998). Collected Works of Edwin Cannan. Vol. 1–7. Routledge Chapman & Hall. ISBN 978-0415152198.
- Ebenstein, Alan O. (2001). Friedrich Hayek: A Biography. New York: Palgrave. ISBN 978-0-312-23344-0 – via Internet Archive.
- Ebenstein, Alan O. (2003). Hayek's Journey: The Mind of Friedrich Hayek. New York: Palgrave Macmillan. ISBN 978-1403960382.
- Ebenstein, Lanny (2007). Milton Friedman: A Biography. Palgrave Macmillan.
- Ebenstein, Lanny (October 6, 2010). Reforming Public Employee Compensation and Pensions (PDF) (Report). California Center for Public Policy. Archived from the original (PDF) on February 8, 2011.
- Ebenstein, Lanny (2012). The Indispensable Milton Friedman: Essays on Politics and Economics. Washington, DC: Regnery. ISBN 978-1596988088.
- Ebenstein, Lanny (2015). Chicagonomics: The Evolution of Chicago Free Market Economics. New York: St. Martin's Press. ISBN 978-0230621954.
