= Trinity Episcopal Church (Santa Barbara, California) =

Coordinates: 34.4264°N 119.7087°W

- The Parish Church of the Holy Trinity
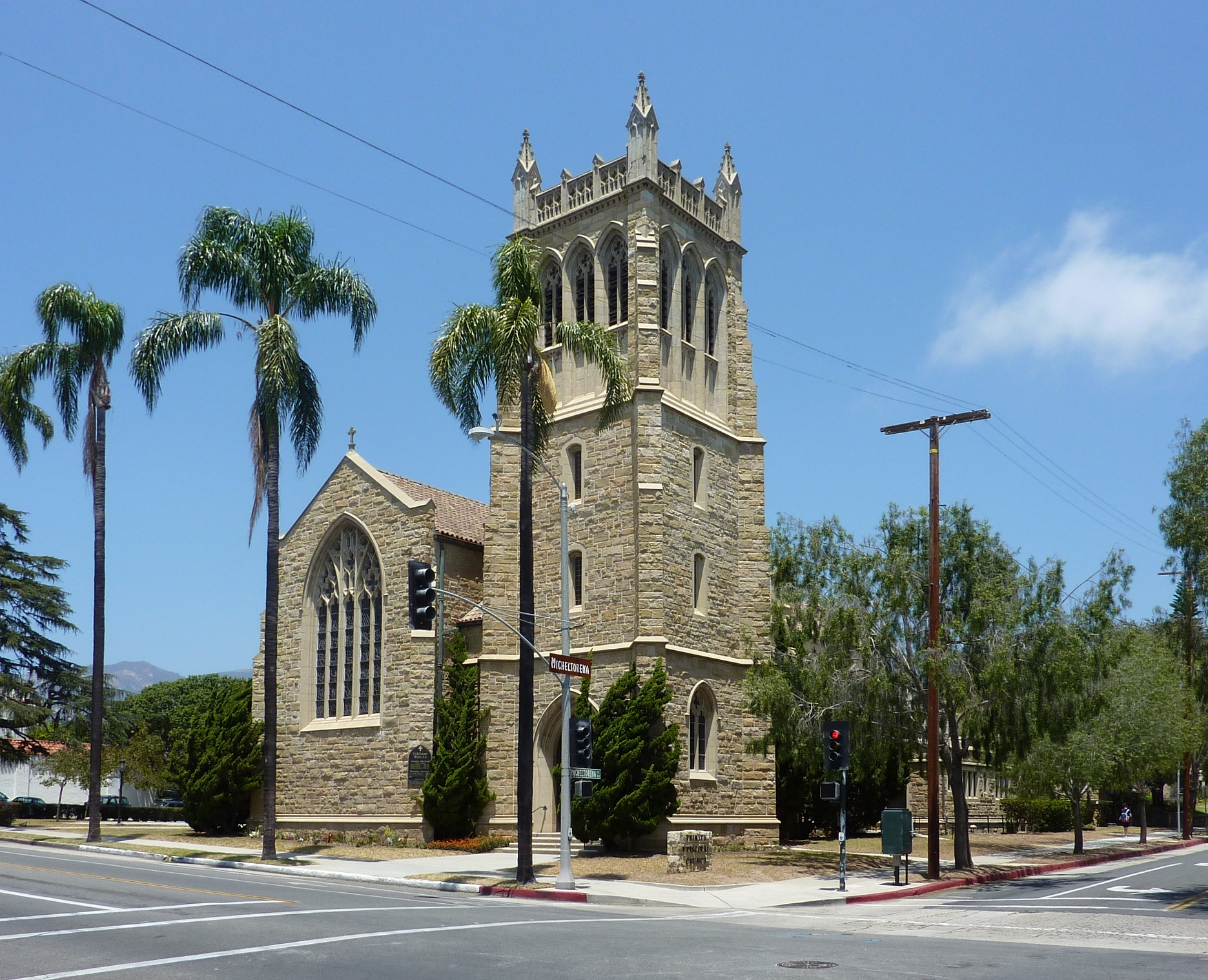
- Trinity Episcopal Church in July 2015
- Trinity Episcopal Church
- Location: 1500 State Street; Santa Barbara, California
- Country: United States
- Denomination: Episcopal Church
- Website: trinitysb.org

History
- Founded: 1866
- Consecrated: 1919

Architecture
- Architect(s): Philip Hubert Frohman and Harold Martin
- Style: Gothic Revival

Trinity Episcopal Church is an Episcopal church located in Santa Barbara, California.

== History ==
The church was founded in 1866 by the second protestant denomination in Santa Barbara, on a lot located on the first block of East Gutierrez Street which was donated by parishioner Dr. Samuel Brinkerhoff in the 1850s. The church had to be relocated in 1887 to the corner of East Anacapa and Anapamu Streets after the Southern Pacific Railroad laid tracks down the middle of Gutierrez Street, causing copious amounts of noise, smoke and dust. The new church, built with redwood and a 120-foot steeple, stood for the next 16 years until a fire destroyed it on December 20, 1903. In 1912, the church raised $54,000 to build a new building on the corner of State and Micheltorena Streets. Designed by Philip Hubert Frohman and Harold Martin, it was built with load-bearing stone and a steel-reinforced rubble and mortar core and was completed in 1919. In February 2019, the church became a City of Santa Barbara Historic Landmark.

== See also ==
- City of Santa Barbara Historic Landmarks
