= Pearl Chase =

American civic leader

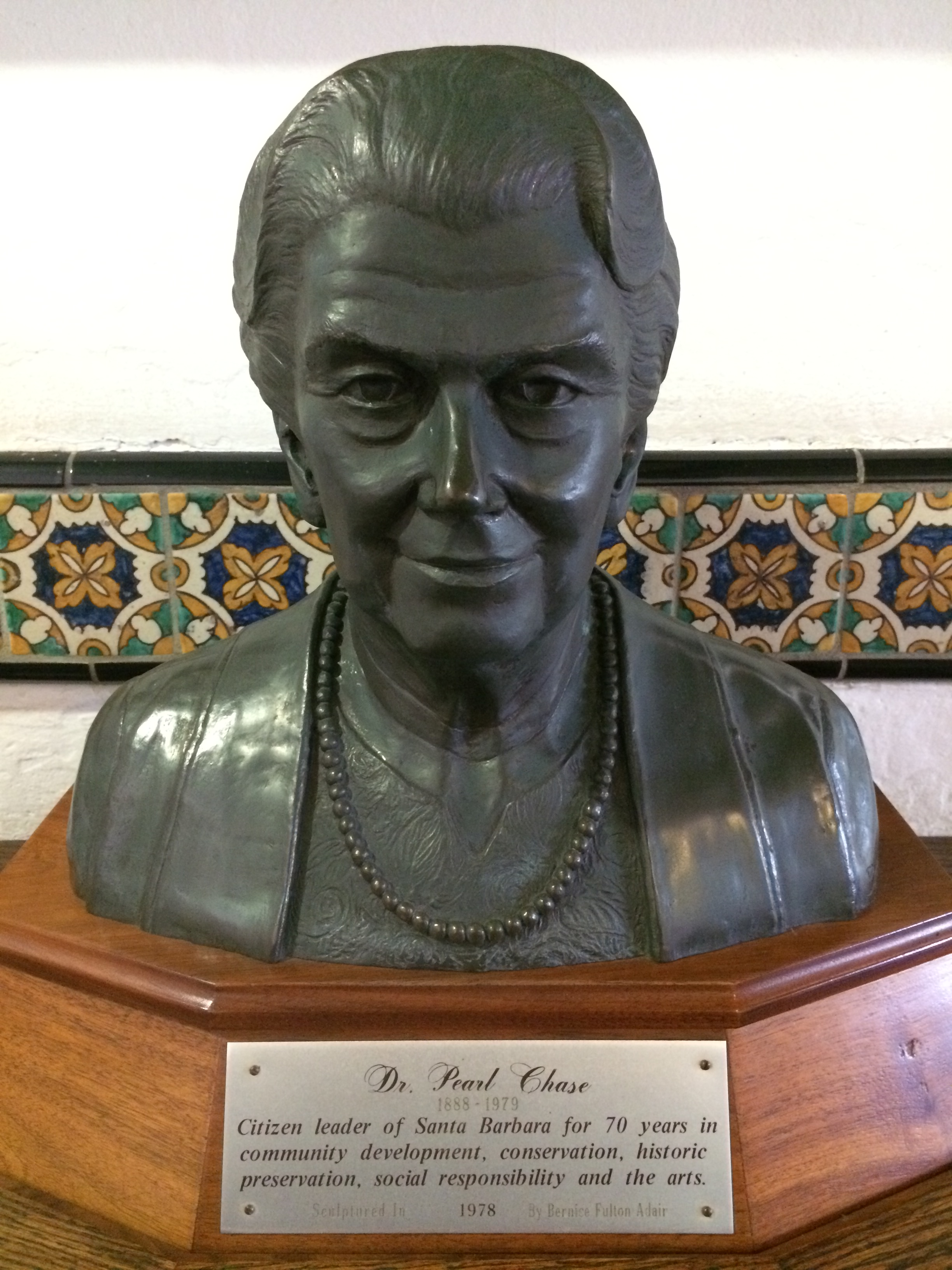
- Sculpture of Pearl Chase at the Santa Barbara County Courthouse
- Born: November 16, 1888; Boston, Massachusetts, US
- Died: October 24, 1979 (aged 90); Santa Barbara, California, US
- Education: University of California at Berkeley (1909); Santa Barbara State Normal School of Manual Arts and Home Economics (later University of California, Santa Barbara)
- Awards: Frances K. Hutchinson Medal (1949)

Pearl Chase was a civic leader in Santa Barbara, California. She is best known for her significant impact on the historic preservation and conservation of that city.

== Early life ==
Chase was born in Boston, Massachusetts and moved to Santa Barbara at the age of 12. After graduating from Santa Barbara High School in 1904, she attended the University of California at Berkeley where she was a member of Kappa Alpha Theta. She graduated with a Bachelor of Letters in history in 1909.

== Civic advocacy ==
Upon returning to Santa Barbara after graduating from the University of California at Berkeley, Chase was appalled at the state of her hometown:

I was ashamed of the dirt and dust and ugly buildings and resolved then and there to devote my life to making Santa Barbara beautiful.

Chase had a significant influence on the city of Santa Barbara, but she never held political or government office of any sort. She founded a number of civic institutions in Santa Barbara, including the local chapter of the American Red Cross, the Community Arts Association, the Santa Barbara Trust for Historic Preservation, and the Indian Defense Association.

She was involved in advocacy for the protection of multiple local landmarks, including Chase Palm Park (which bears a plaque memorializing Chase and her brother), as well as the Moreton Bay Fig Tree.

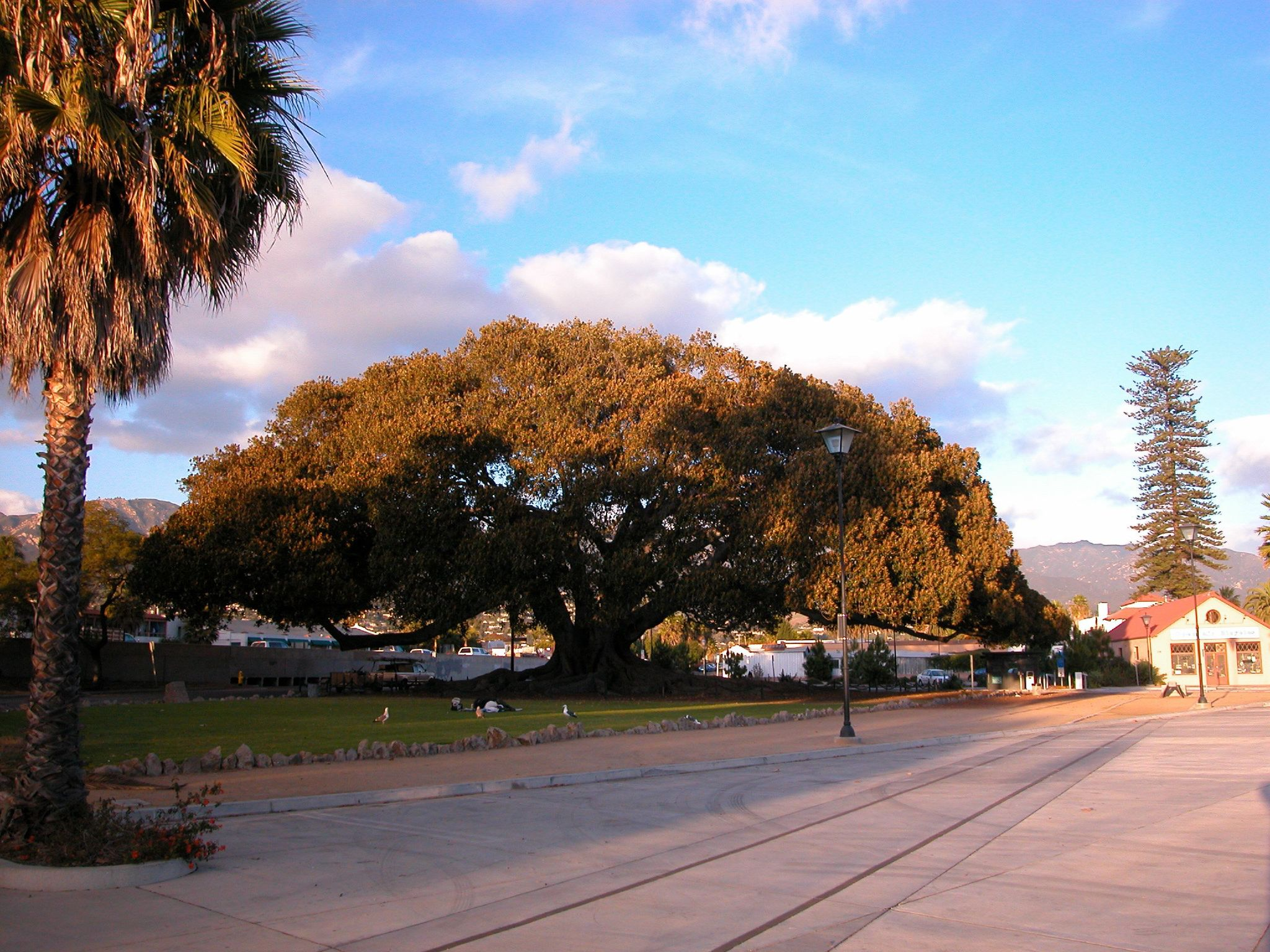
The Moreton Bay Fig Tree

In addition, she was part of an interest group which successfully lobbied the State Legislature, Governor Earl Warren, and the Regents of the University of California to move the Santa Barbara State Teachers College to the University of California system in 1944.

Historian Walker A. Tompkins summarized her influence on the city by saying that "She did more to beautify her adopted home town of Santa Barbara than any other individual."

== Legacy ==
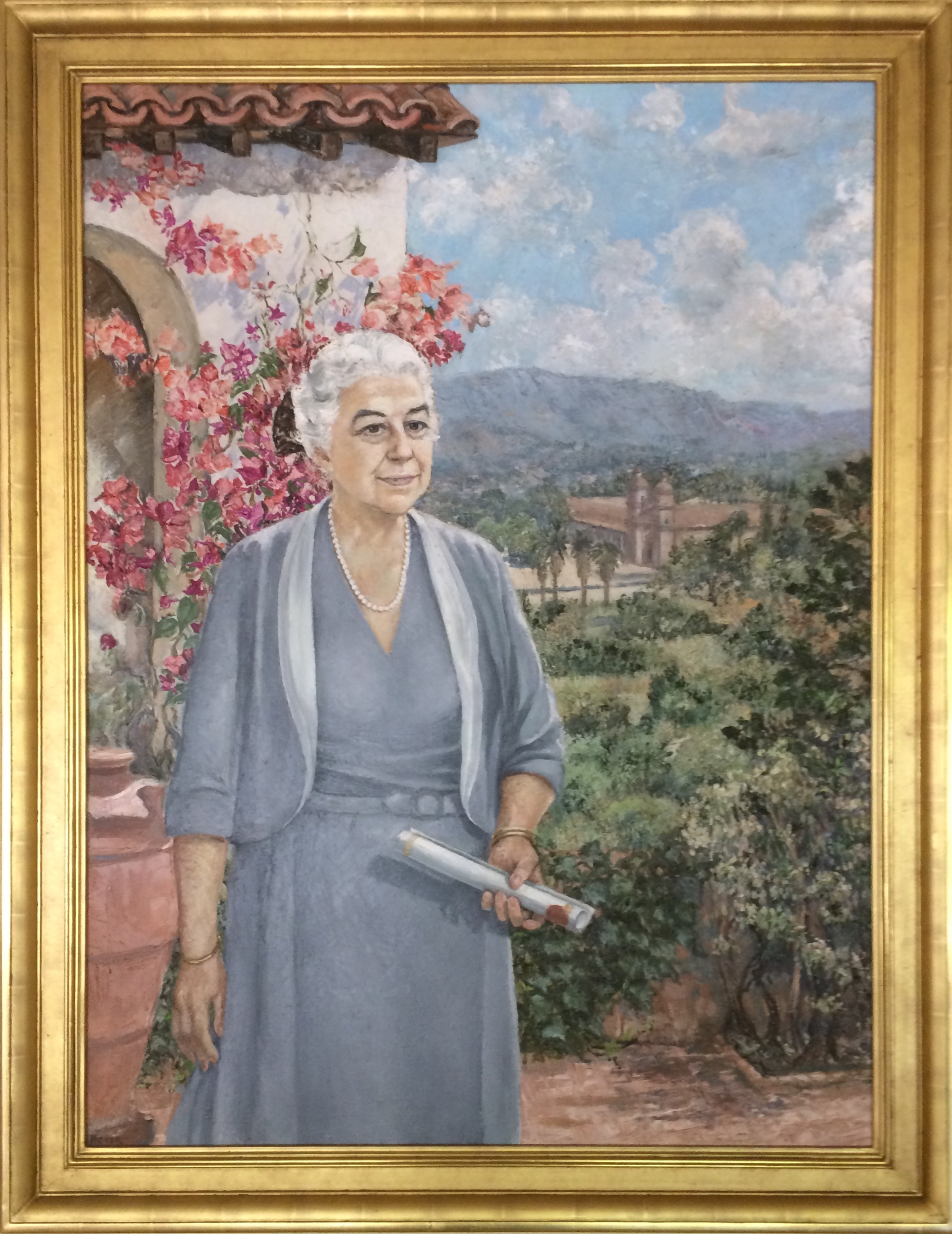
Portrait of Pearl Chase at the Santa Barbara Community Center

Chase was part of the founding of an organization called the Santa Barbara Council of Christmas Cheer, which brought gifts to needy community members. This organization was eventually formalized as the Unity Shoppe, a storefront on State Street which "operates a year-round 'Free' grocery and clothing store so people can shop with dignity for their basic needs."

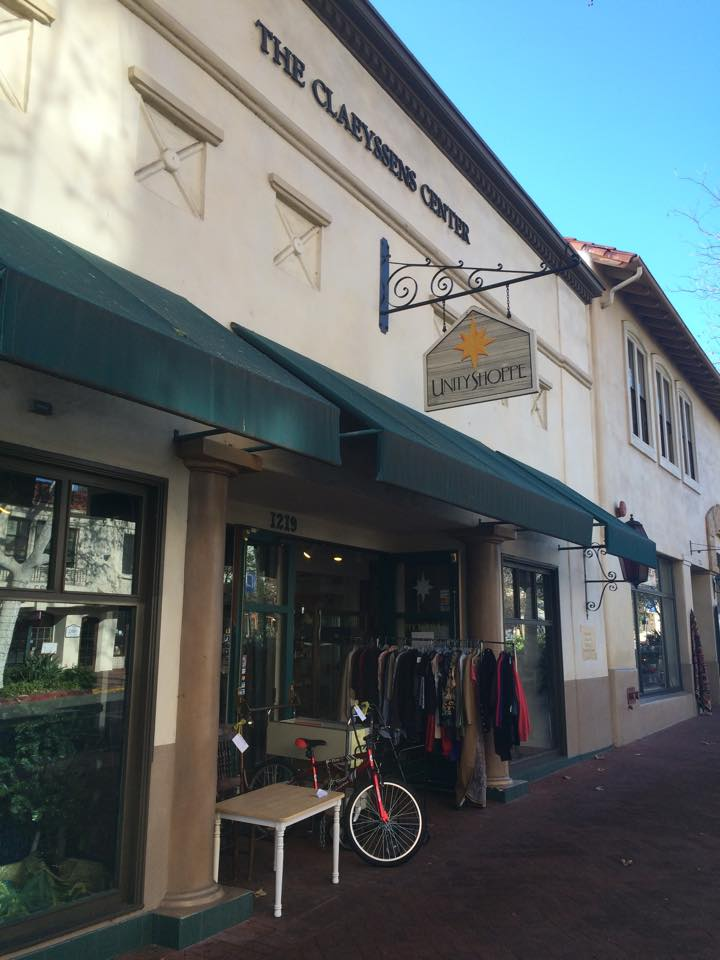
The Unity Shoppe, on State Street in Santa Barbara, is derived from a charitable group founded by Chase.

A scholarship in Chase's name has been instituted at University of California, Santa Barbara in the department of Environmental Studies. In addition, the Pearl Chase Society, a not-for-profit organization "dedicated to preserving Santa Barbara’s historic architecture, landscapes and cultural heritage," seeks to carry on her work.

== Resources ==
- Community Development and Conservation Collection, University of California, Santa Barbara
- Pearl Chase Papers, University of California, Santa Barbara
