= Darras Robert Pyron =

American actor and model (1959–1991)

- Born: Darras Robert Pyron; August 3, 1959; Willows, California, U.S.
- Died: July 10, 1991 (aged 31); Los Angeles, California, U.S.
- Other names: Lee Ryder; Bobby Pyron
- Education: Esperanza High School
- Occupations: Actor; Model; Floral designer
- Years active: 1980–1991
- Agent: Falcon Studios
- Partner: Rod Phillips (1982–1985)

Darras Robert Pyron (August 3, 1959 – July 10, 1991), known professionally as Lee Ryder, was an American gay adult film actor and accomplished floral designer. A prominent figure during the "Golden Age" of the gay adult film industry in the early 1980s, he later transitioned into a career in high-end floral artistry, providing arrangements for Hollywood television sets and luxury hotels.

== Early life and education ==
Robert Pyron, often called "Bobby" by friends, was born in Willows, California. He was the son of Darras Roosevelt Pyron and Dorothy Phyllis Dexter and grew up in the Laguna area. He was the brother of Debra Jean Riseling. He attended Esperanza High School in Anaheim, where he graduated before starting his career in entertainment. In a later interview with Stallion magazine, he recounted a significant relationship with an older man during his teens that ended tragically, an event he cited as a major influence on his early life.

== Career ==
=== Adult Film Industry ===
Discovered by Mark Reynolds, Ryder became a legendary figure in 1980s gay cinema. His debut in All American Boys was followed by his breakout role in Falcon Studios' Huge (1982). Between 1982 and 1986, he starred in many gay film features, including Bijou Video classics like Screenplay, A Few Good Men, and Giants 1. Critics often cited his intense, "Joan Crawford-like" eyes as his most striking features.

During his peak years, he was a frequent cover model for gay publications such as In Touch, Blueboy, and Manshots. Critics often highlighted his distinctive, intense eyes and natural, unforced acting style.

=== Floral Design ===
Despite his fame in the adult industry, Pyron's primary professional interest was floral design. Pyron remained pragmatic about his "sex symbol" status, using his income to fund his true passion: floral design. He founded Pyron Designs and became a high-end florist for the Beverly Hills Hotel. He was known for his original, non-traditional arrangements. He worked for Crosley's Flowers in Los Angeles, where he created floral sets for the prime-time soap opera Dynasty and the Beverly Hills Hotel. He founded Pyron Designs, which operated in the 9000 Sunset building in West Hollywood and later in San Francisco.

== Personal life ==
Pyron was an avid traveler, visiting locations such as Switzerland, Germany, Jamaica, and the Panama Canal. For two years, he was in a relationship with Rod Phillips, whom he met on a film set.

== Death and Illness ==
In the late 1980s, Pyron was diagnosed with HIV. He eventually developed progressive multifocal leukoencephalopathy (PML), a rare neurological condition that led to the loss of his eyesight. Friends noted that he remained philosophical and was not bitter about his condition during his final years.

After spending his final year in San Francisco, Pyron's health declined significantly in mid-1991. He returned to Los Angeles and entered the Chris Brownlie AIDS Hospice, where he died of AIDS-related complications on July 10, 1991, at age 31.

== Filmography ==
=== Film ===
Year	Title	Role	Notes
1982	Hugh	Lee	Debut
1982	Biker's Liberty	Blonde in Bed	
1983	A Few Good Men...	New Recruit	
1983	Winner Takes All: High Voltage	Handsome Boy	
1983	Spokes	Ryder	
1983	Hugh II	Lee	
1983	All American Boys	Cody	
1984	The Biggest One I Ever Saw!	Ben	
1984	Screen Play	John	
1985	Hard	Cameo Stud	
1985	2x10	Worker Picking Up Blueprints	
1986	Sticky Business	Andy	
1990	Sex Toilets 3	Blonde	
1993	Dynamite Dicks and Bubble Buns	Lee	Posthumous release
2001	Cum Queens 2: Glory Holes 36	Lee	Posthumous release
2007	Falcon Studios 35th Anniversary Limited Edition	Lee	Posthumous release
2008	The Best of Lee Ryder	Lee Ryder	Posthumous release
2008	The Best of Leo Ford vs. Kurt Marshall	Lee Ryder	Posthumous release
2015	Deep Raw Delivery: Falcon Bareback 24	Lee Ryder	Posthumous release
2016	Dangerous Sex in Public Places 1	Lee	Posthumous release
2021	Falcon Icons: The 1980s	Lee	Posthumous release

== Legacy ==
A memorial service was held at the Hollywood United Methodist Church on July 14, 1991. His ashes were interred at Montecito Memorial Park in San Bernardino on July 26, 1991. He is memorialized on the AIDS Memorial Quilt. He was survived by his parents and his sister, Debra Jean Riseling.
