= Jimmy's Oriental Gardens =

Historic Chinese restaurant in Santa Barbara, California

Coordinates: 34°25′20″N 119°41′55″W

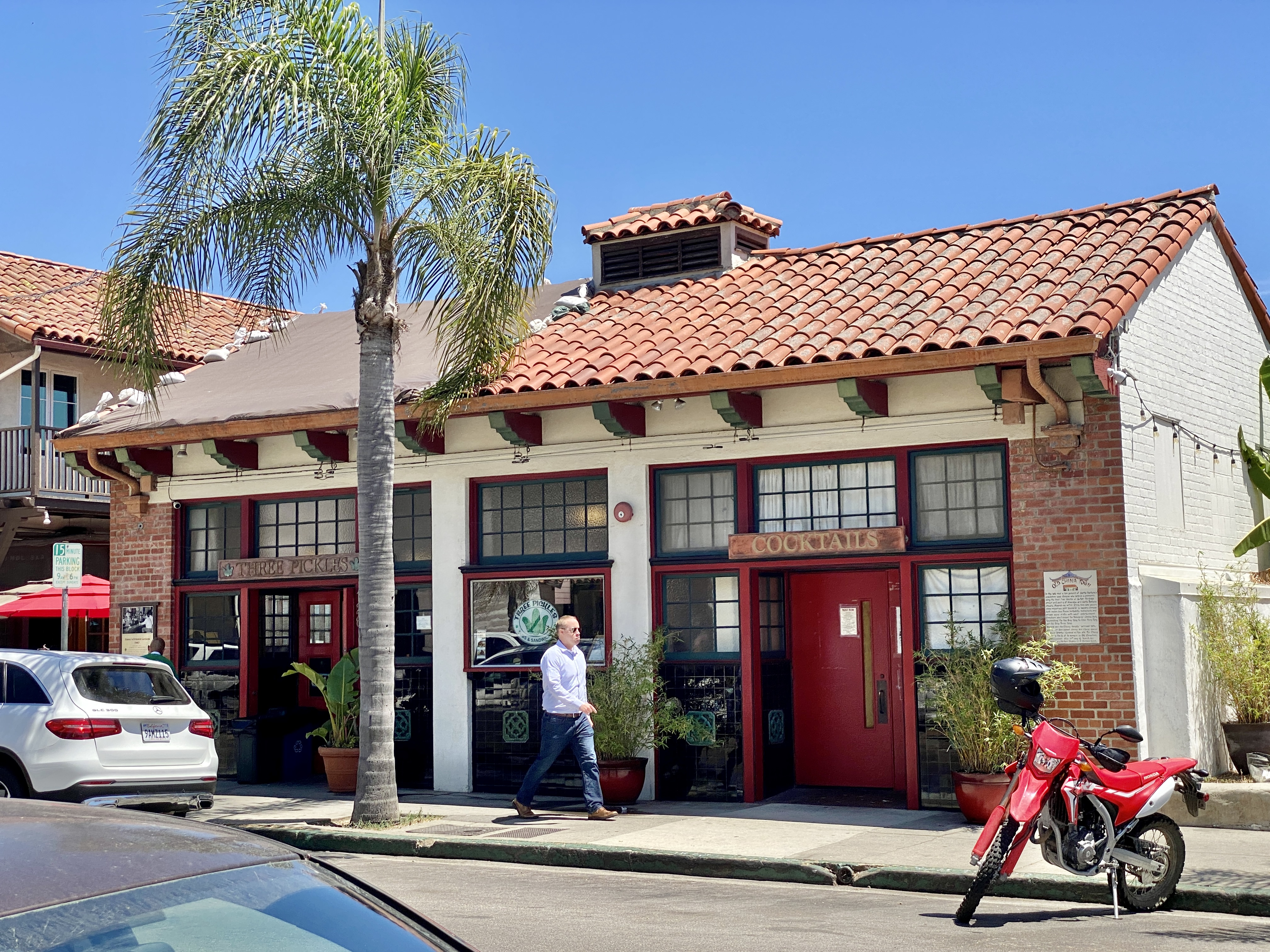
Jimmy's Oriental Gardens

Jimmy's Oriental Gardens was a restaurant that operated in Santa Barbara, CA.

In March 2007, the Santa Barbara Trust for Historic Preservation purchased Jimmy's Oriental Gardens from the Chung family. On September 19, 2018 the building at 126. E Canon Perdido Street and 126 E. Canon Perdido Street #B was designated a structure of merit. The historic name was "Jimmy's Oriental Gardens and Chung Family Home". In 2014, the building earned historic status when it was purchased by the state of California as part of the El Presidio de Santa Bárbara State Historic Park.

== Early history ==
Jimmy's Oriental Gardens opened in 1947 by James "Jimmy" Lee Chung. It closed in 2006 when Jimmy's son and operator at the time, Tommy, decided to retire.

== Early family history ==
James "Jimmy" Yee Chung was born in China on July 21, 1910. The son of Wah Hing Chung, the Chung family owned Wah Hing Chung Laundry in Santa Barbara. It closed in the 1940s. Jimmy was 12 years old when he arrived in Santa Barbara with his family. Despite the family laundry business, Jimmy opened his first restaurant, the Friendly Cafe, in 1936.

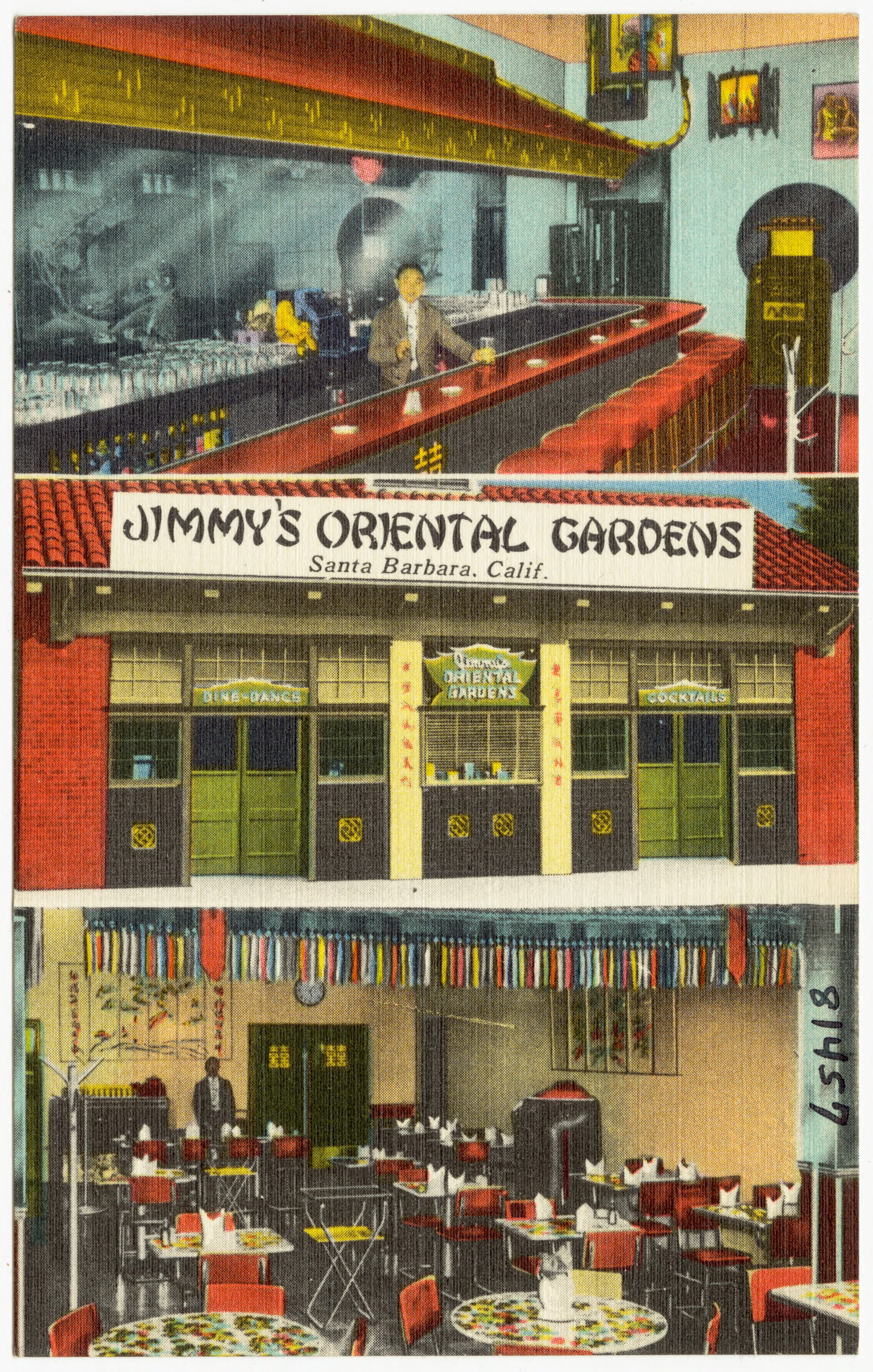
Jimmy's Oriental Gardens, [ca. 1930–1945]

Jimmy opened the Oriental Gardens in 1940 after closing Friendly Cafe. The restaurant moved several times before settling into its final location at 126 East Canon Perdido.

Behind the restaurant, a two-story house was built where Jimmy and his wife Nuey raised their five children: Bill, Tommy, Kong, John, and Barbara.

== History of Chinatown in Santa Barbara ==
Chinese workers first arrived in Central California around the 1860s to help build what is now known as Stagecoach Road on Highway 154. They worked as farm laborers, in resort hotels as servants, housekeepers, and cooks, and laundrymen.

Chinese stores, restaurants, and laundries began opening on the 00 block of East Canon Perdido Street between State Street and Anacapa Street, which eventually became known as Old Chinatown. The block eventually became known as "the new Chinatown" with buildings including a rooming house, school, community meeting space, and place of worship.

Jimmy's Oriental Gardens was the final new building to arrive on the block, in 1947. The original building housed a bakery, but was demolished to make room for a new, one-story brick facade that included tiles and a gabled roof, along with Chinese decor. It was designed by architect Roy W. Cheeseman; Whittaker & Snook served as the contractor. Today, a glazed tile plague outside Jimmy's Oriental Gardens Restaurant serves as a reminder of the neighborhood's Chinese history.

== In media ==
In 2014, music and film production company Dissonant Media, filmed the short documentary "Grasshopper for Grandpa" about the history of Jimmy's Oriental Gardens. The title of the documentary was inspired by a story written by Matt Kettmann, and published in the Santa Barbara Independent. In 2015, "Grasshopper for Grandpa" premiered at the Santa Barbara International Film Festival.
