= Rafael González House =

Historic house in California, United States

- U.S. National Register of Historic Places
- U.S. National Historic Landmark
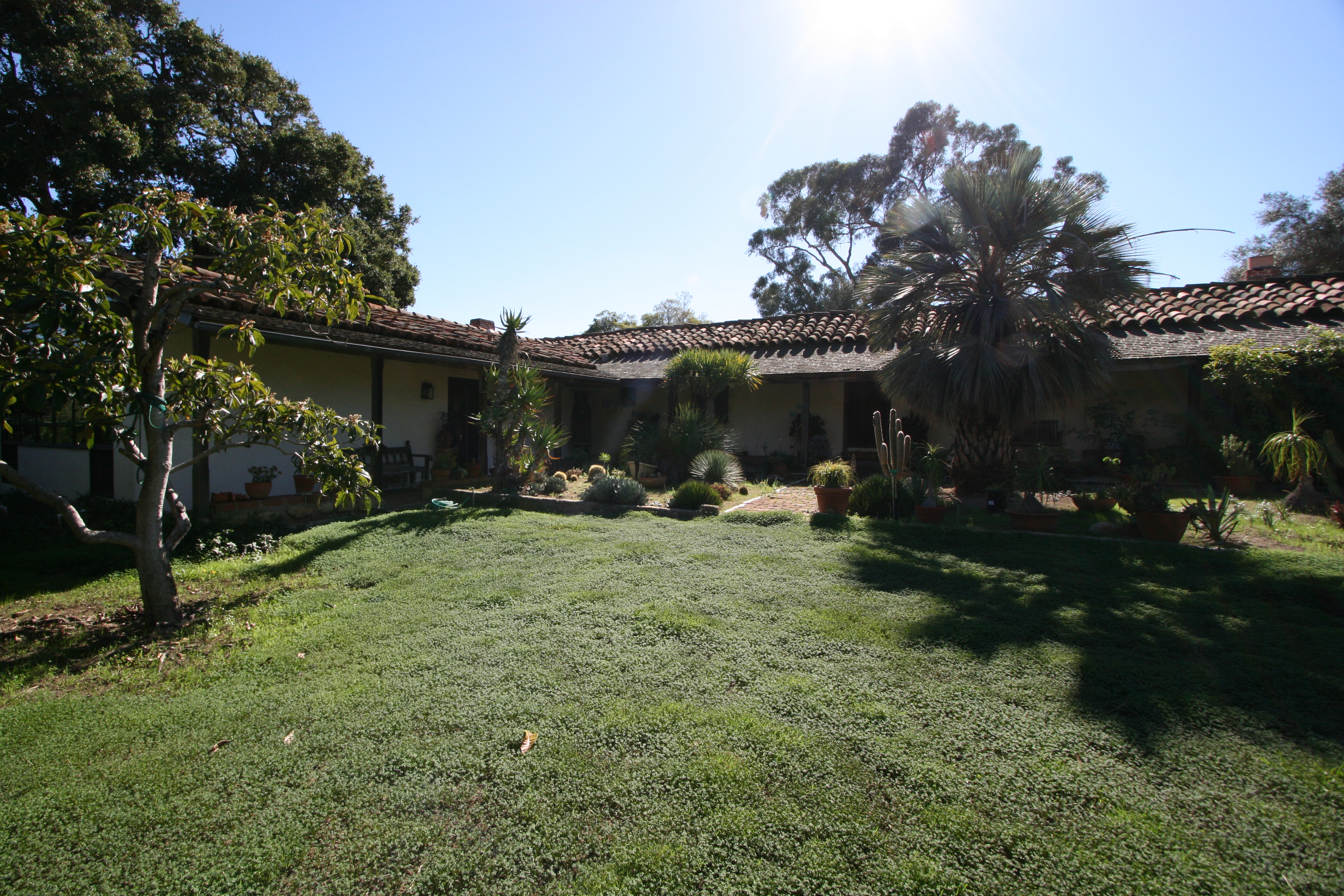
- The general view of the house

- Location within California Location within the United States
- Location: 835 Laguna Street, Santa Barbara, California
- Coordinates: 34°25′27.18″N 119°41′45.08″W
- Area: 1.5 acres (0.61 ha)
- Built: 1825
- Architect: Rafael González
- NRHP reference No.: 70000149

Significant dates
- Added to NRHP: April 15, 1970
- Designated NHL: April 15, 1970

The Rafael González House is an historic house in the historic center of the city of Santa Barbara, California. Built in 1825, it is one of a small number of surviving adobe houses from the Mexican period of California history. It was designated a National Historic Landmark on April 15, 1970, and added to the National Register of Historic Places.

== Description ==
The González House is located north of Santa Barbara's central business district, on the south side of Laguna Street between East Canon Perdido Street and East De La Guerra Street. It is a single-story adobe structure, with seven rooms. It is built in the U-shape (with the longest part being parallel to Laguna Street) and stands on a hill, separated from both Laguna and Canon Perdido streets by garden walls. Its walls are up to 2 feet (0.61 m) thick, covered with lime plaster, and its long sides are sheltered by wooden verandas. When built, it had packed-earth floors, which were tiled during restoration in the 1920s. The roof, now shingled, was historically covered in terra cotta tile.

As of 2025, it has been sold and is now a private residence.

== History ==
The building was constructed in 1825 by Rafael González , a landowner who in 1829 became an alcalde of Santa Barbara. At this time, Santa Barbara was a part of Mexican California. After his death, in 1866, the house was inherited by one of his daughters, Francisca Ventura González de Ramires. She lived in the house until 1923, when it was sold out of the family. It has seen mainly commercial uses since then.

== Gallery ==
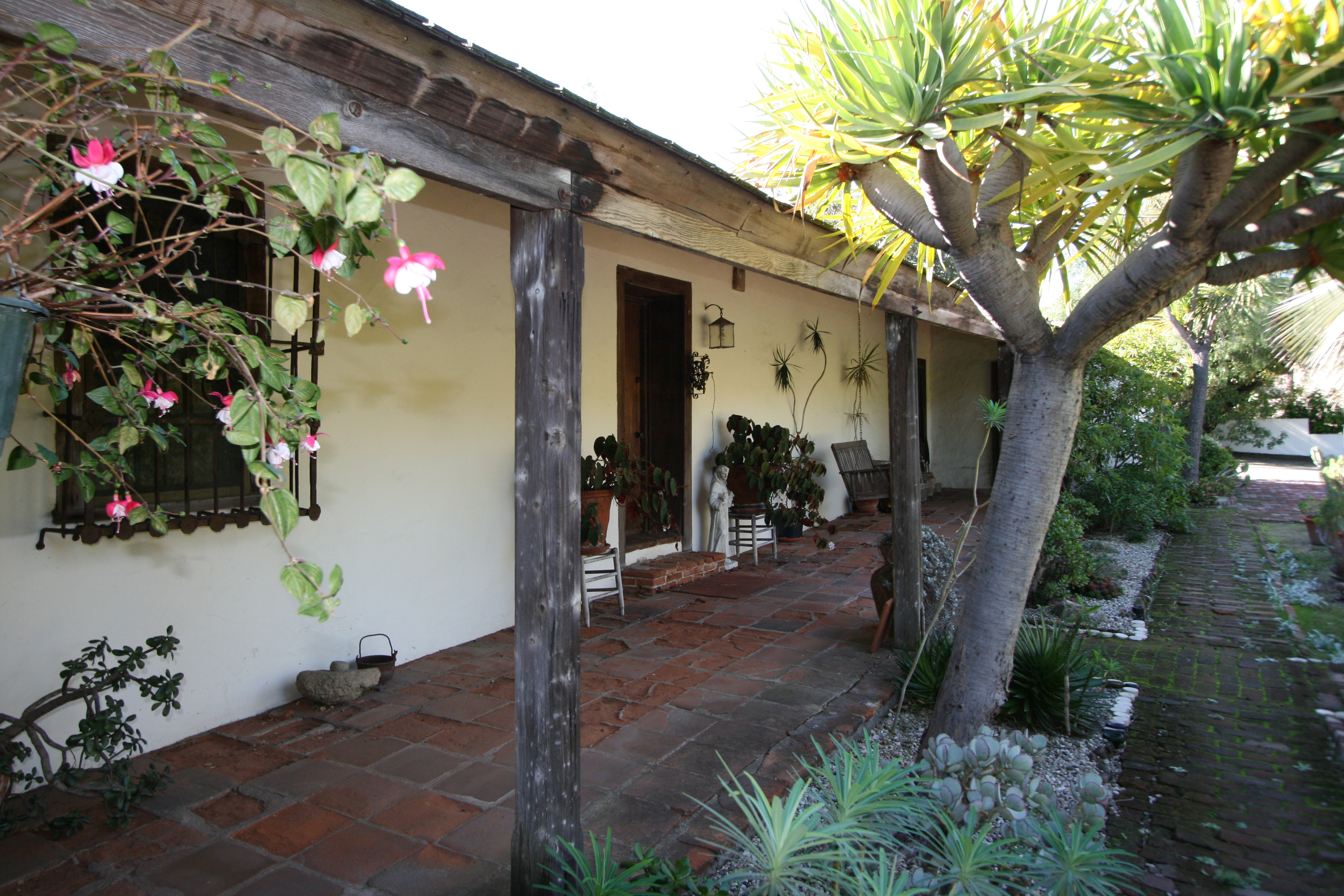
Veranda along one wing.

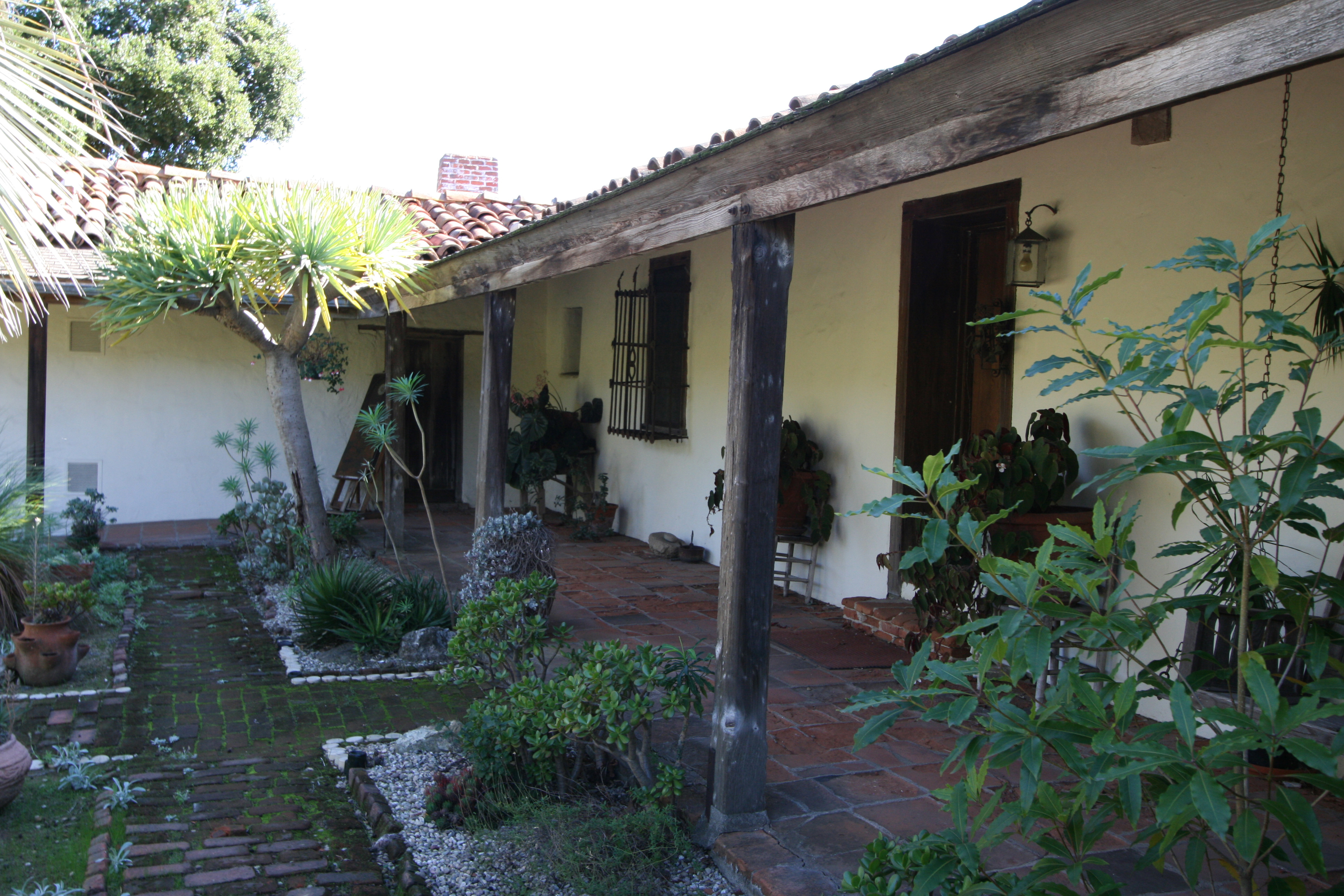
Veranda along the other wing.

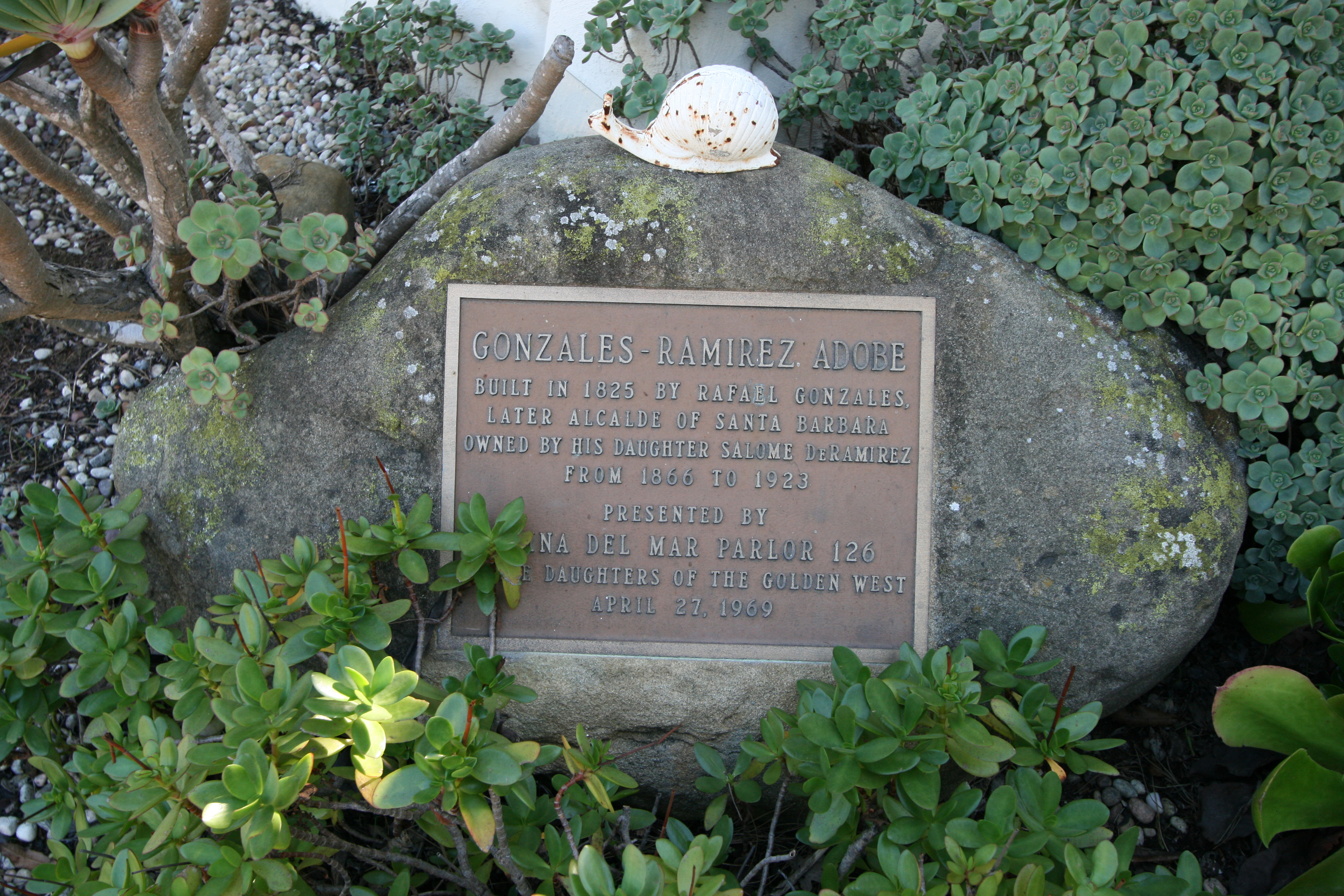
Plaque commemorating Rafael González House history.
