= Our Lady of Sorrows Church (Santa Barbara, California) =

Coordinates: 34.426347°N 119.706108°W

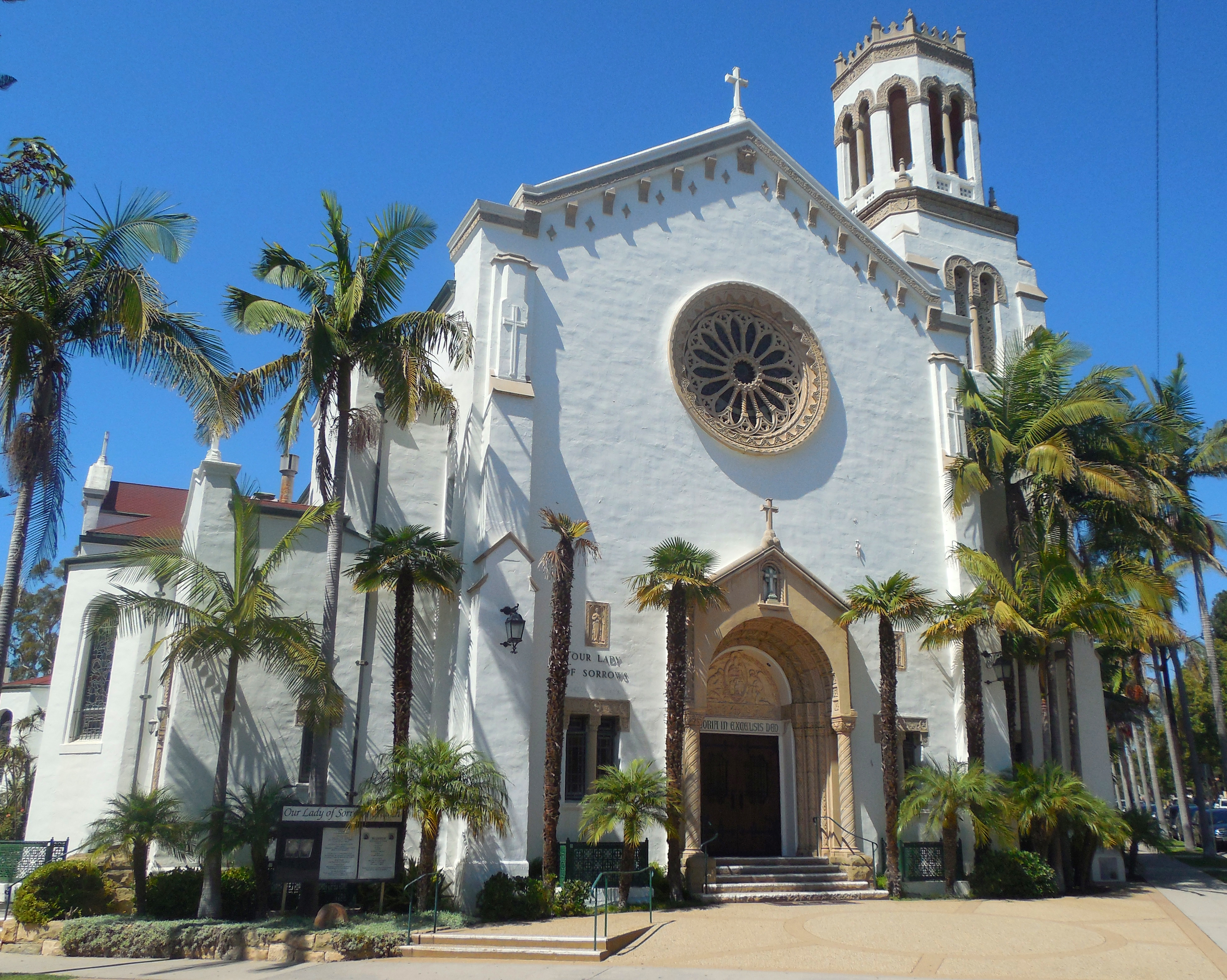
- Our Lady of Sorrows Church
- Location: 21 East Sola Street, Santa Barbara, California
- Country: United States
- Denomination: Roman Catholic

History
- Status: Church
- Founded: July 29, 1855

Architecture
- Heritage designation: Designated landmark of the City of Santa Barbara
- Designated: May 17, 2016
- Architect: Edward Eames
- Architectural type: Spanish Colonial Revival
- Style: Spanish Romanesque architecture
- Completed: 1929

Our Lady of Sorrows Church (Spanish: Iglesia de Nuestra Señora de los Dolores) is a Catholic church within the City of Santa Barbara, California in the United States that was built in 1929. The Church was listed as a designated landmark of the City of Santa Barbara on May 17, 2016. It is dedicated to Our Lady of Sorrows.

== History ==
Our Lady of Sorrows Church traces its origins to 1782 as the original chapel serving the Presidio of Santa Barbara, which was constructed to protect the colonial establishment of the Spanish Empire within California. Built to serve the Spanish military, the church was founded by Father Junípero Serra, O.F.M., who celebrated Santa Barbara's first Mass at the original site of the Presidio Chapel and had initially supplied all of the furnishings, altar pieces, and a library.

On July 29, 1855, the first church building was consecrated. Initially located at northeast corner of State Street and Figueroa Street, the church was primarily constructed by the students of the nearby seminary college known as the Apostolic College of Our Lady of Sorrows. However, the building was destroyed by fire in August 1865.

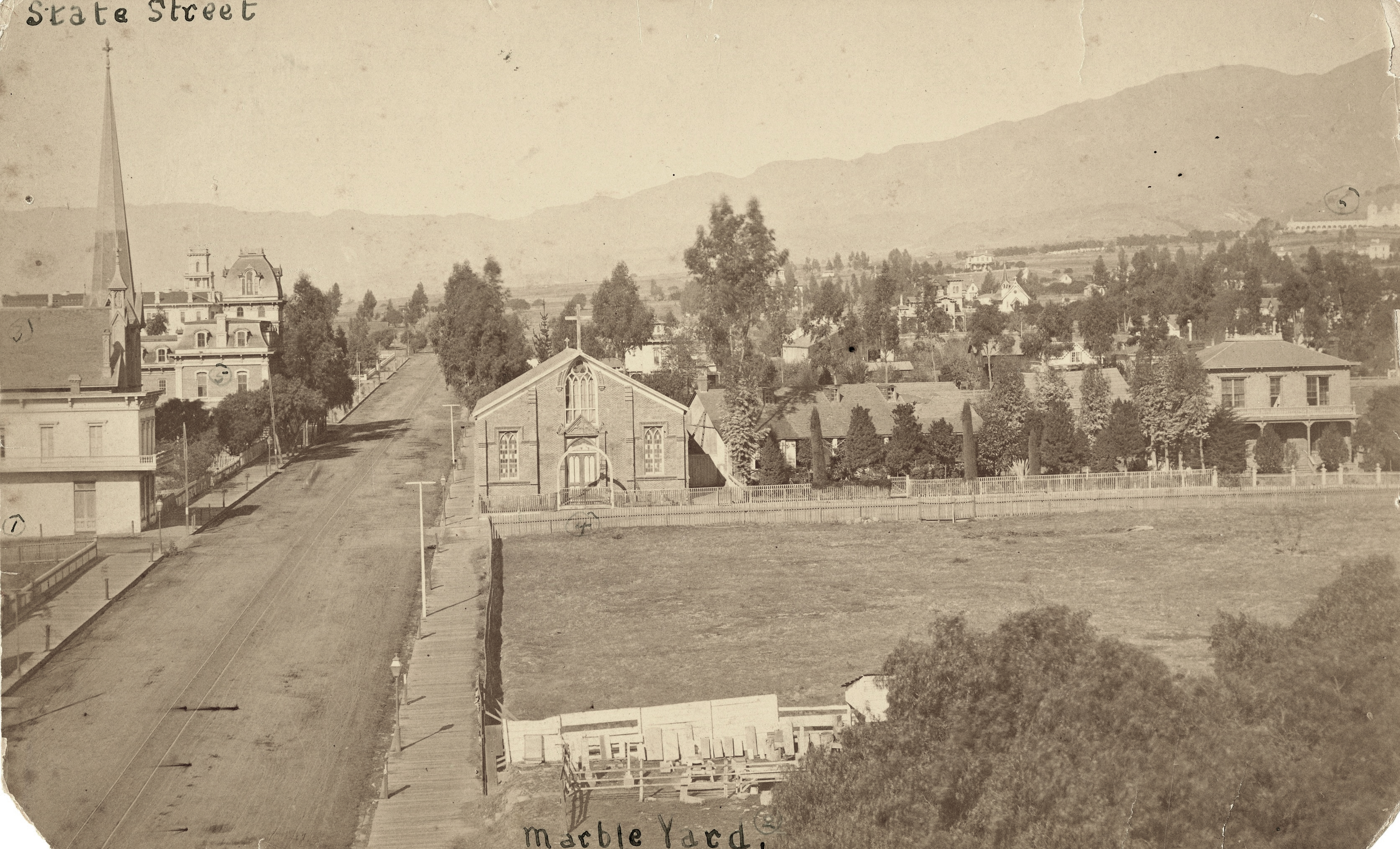
Our Lady of Sorrows Church on State & Figueroa Streets, circa 1880.

A new southward facing replacement for the church was completed in May 1867 at the same intersection as its predecessor. During 1904, two new bell towers were added to house the three bells, weighing; 2,200 lb (1,000 kg), 1,250 lb (570 kg), and 650 lb (290 kg), which were blessed on July 17 that year.

By 1908, the church administration was passed to the Jesuit Fathers of the California Province of the Society of Jesus.

On the morning of June 29, 1925, the 6.8 Richter magnitude scale Santa Barbara earthquake destroyed much of the church, including; the facade, an entire side, and one of the bell towers. The remaining bell tower was heavily damaged. A new site was selected at the present day location on the southwestern corner of East Sola Street and Anacapa Street, across from Alameda Park.

On June 30, 2014, a Mass was held that passed the administration of the church over to the Archdiocese of Los Angeles.

== Gallery ==
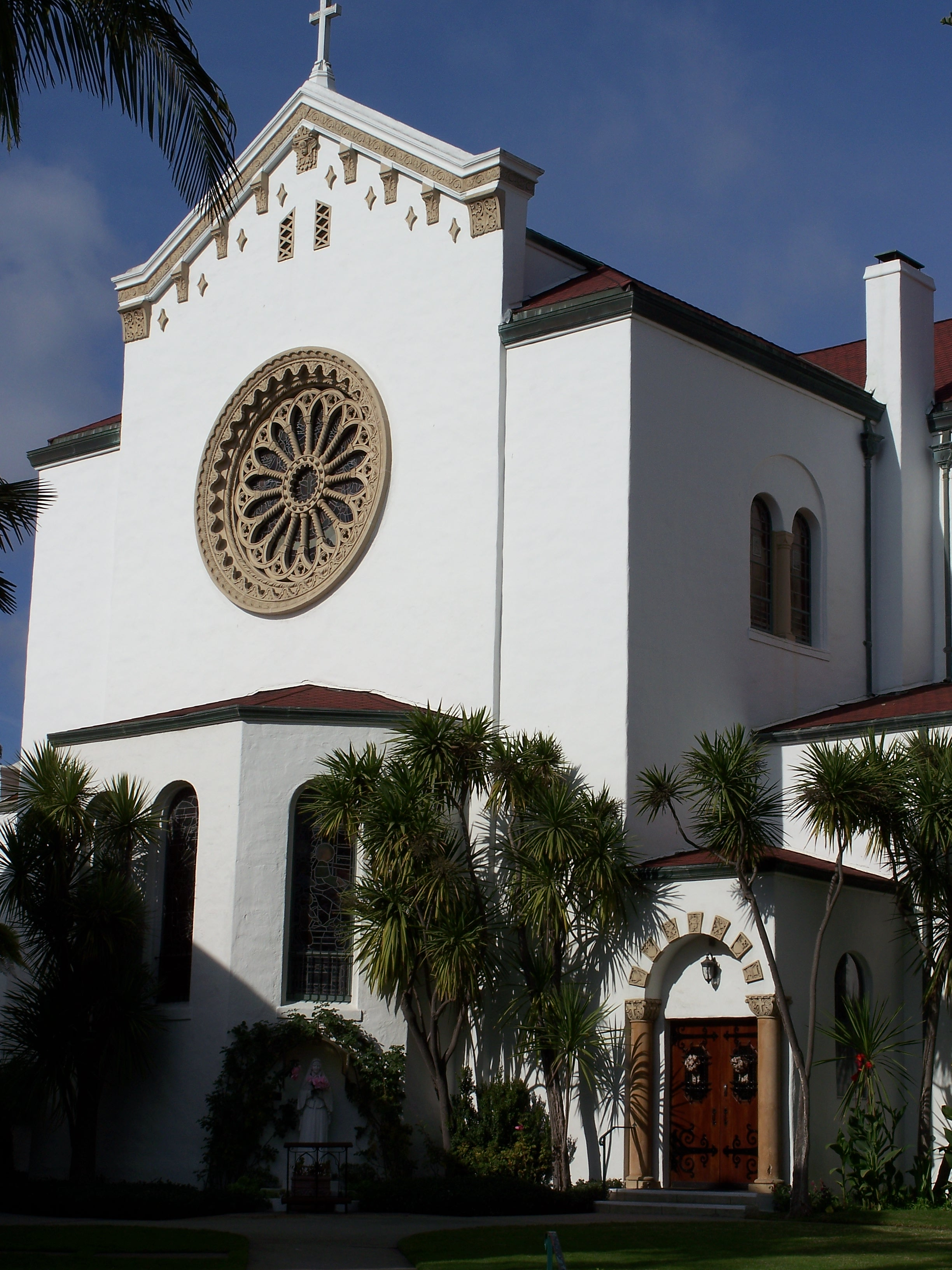
Southern transept of the church

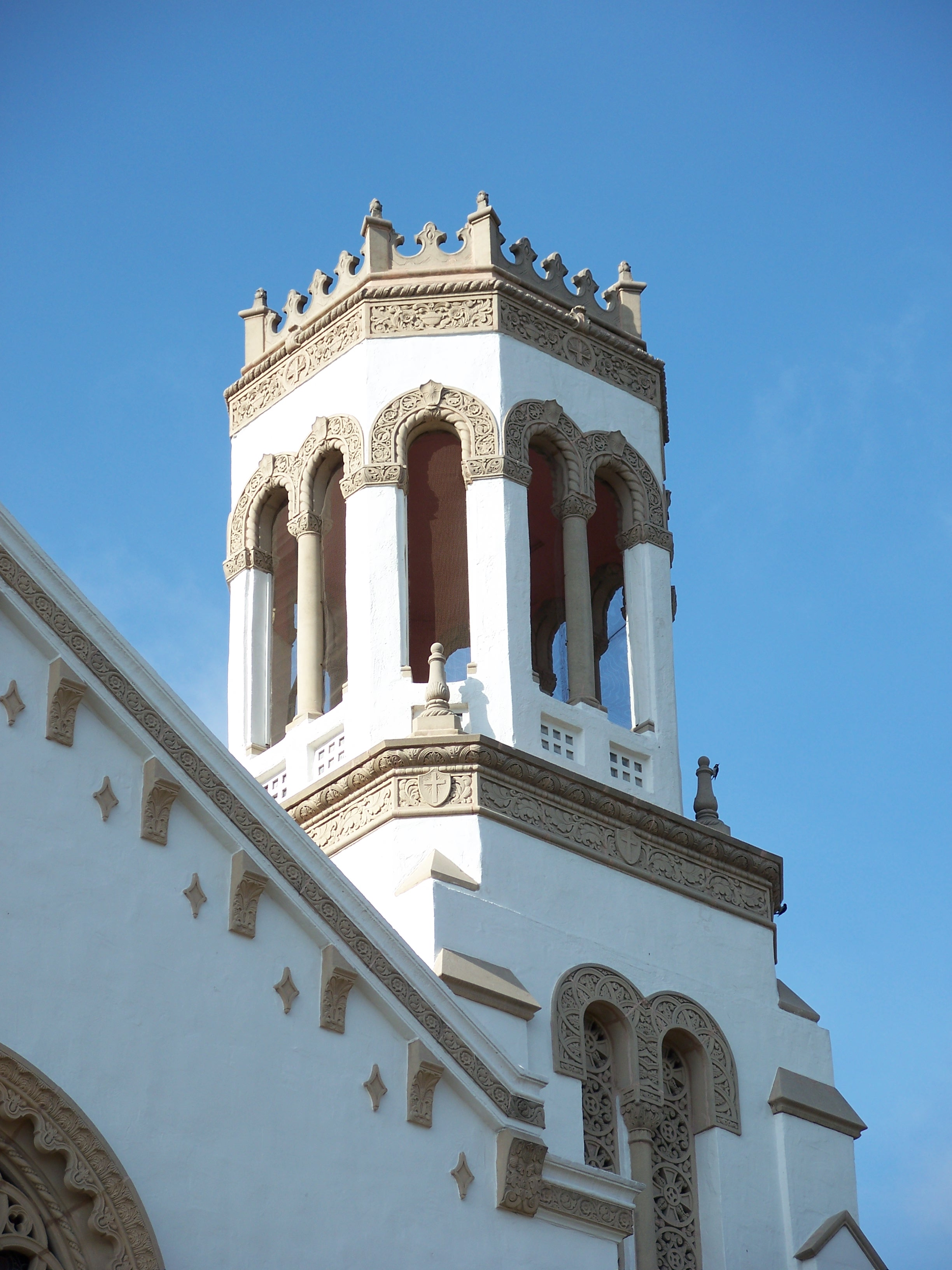
Tower

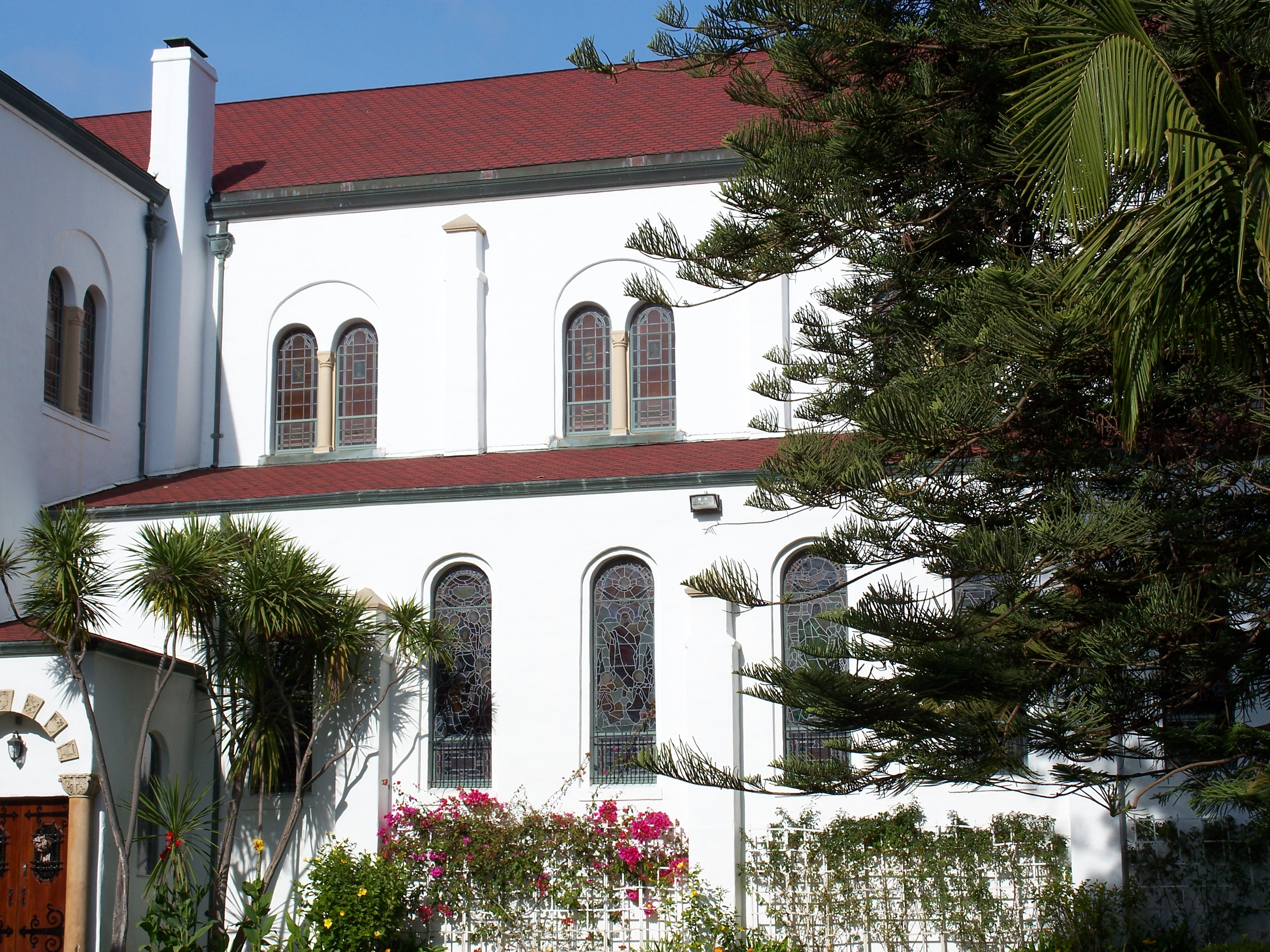
Southern side elevation

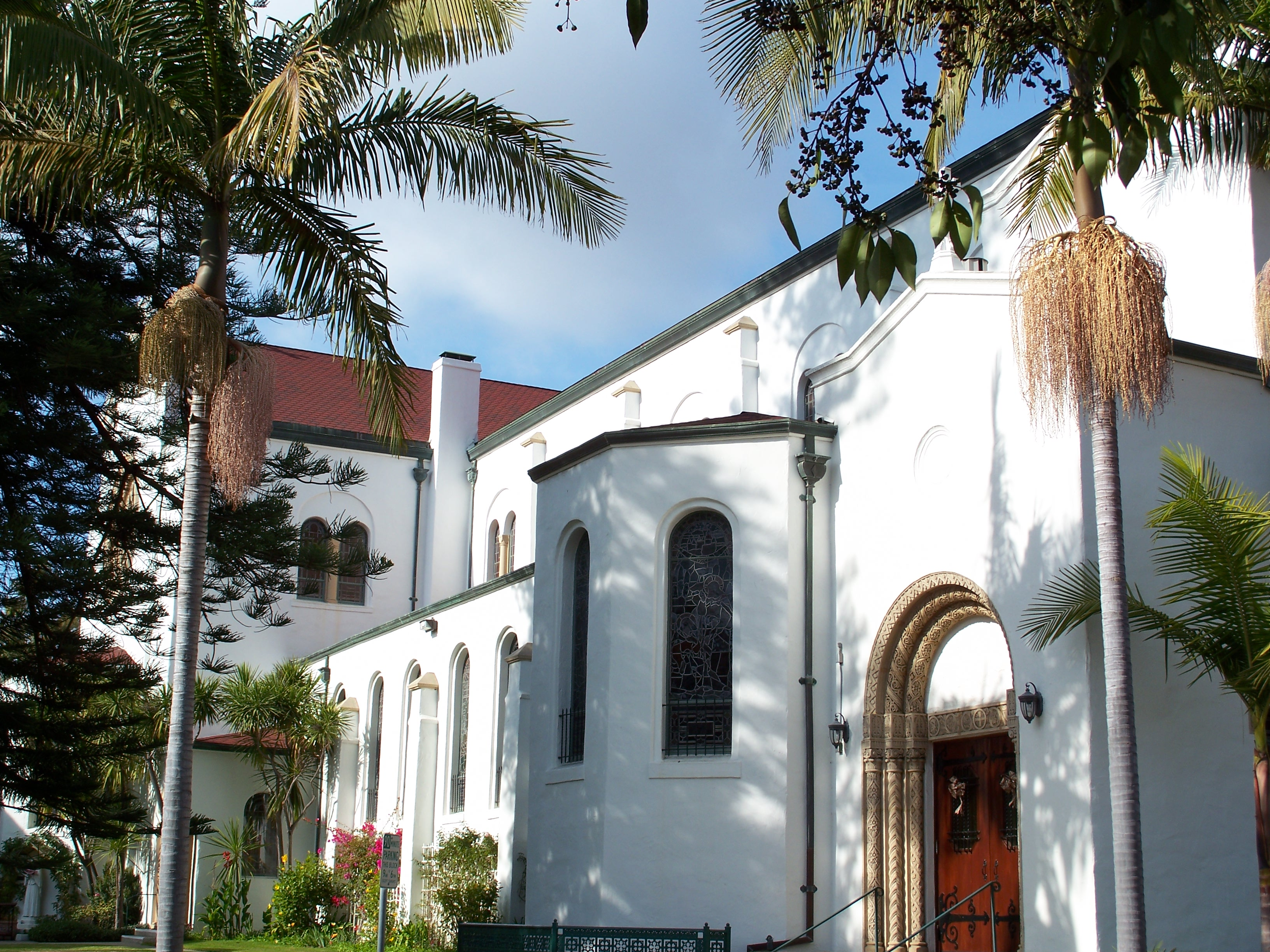
Oblique view of the southern side elevation

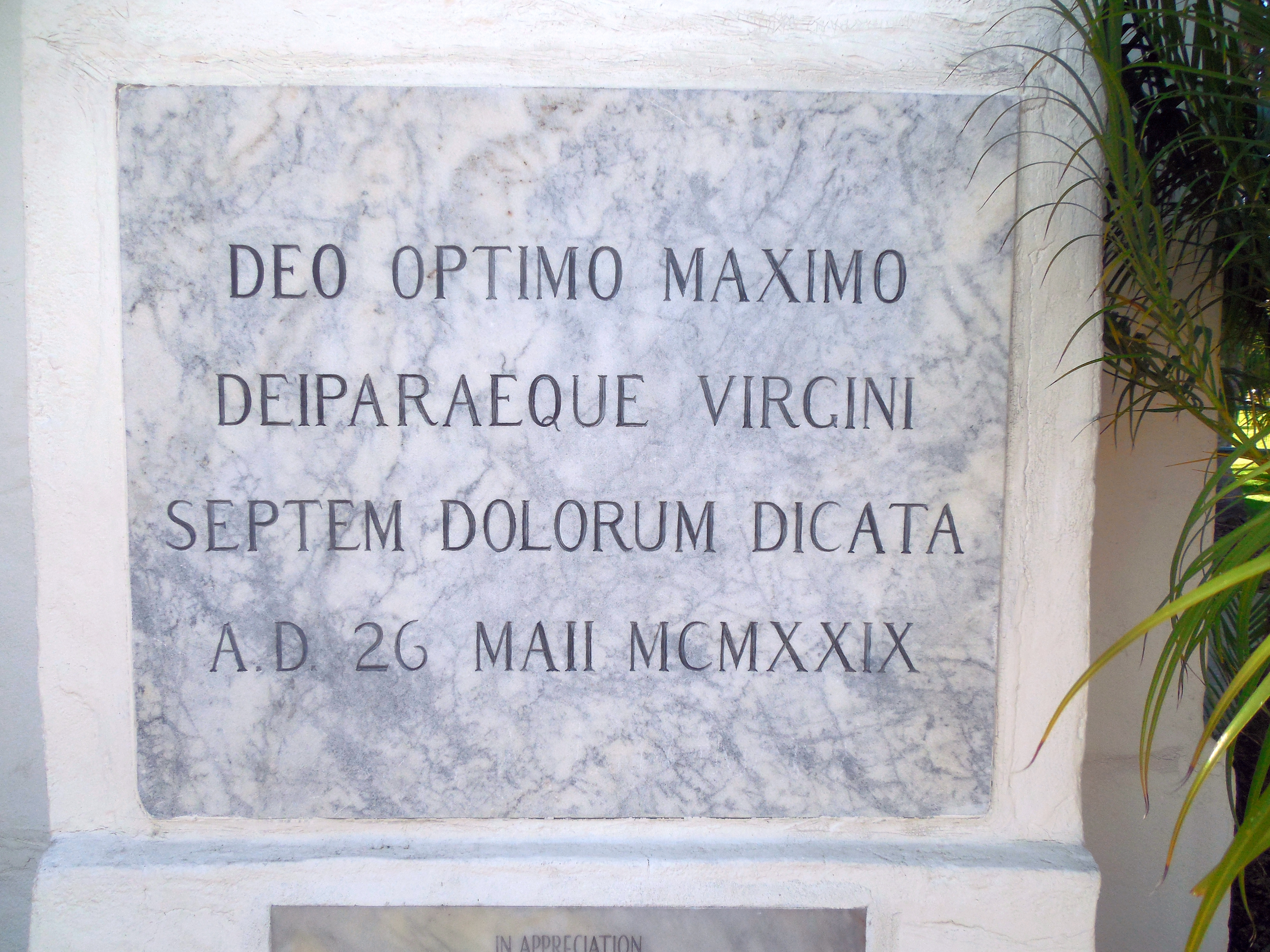
Plaque of the cornerstone
