= Santa Barbara High School =

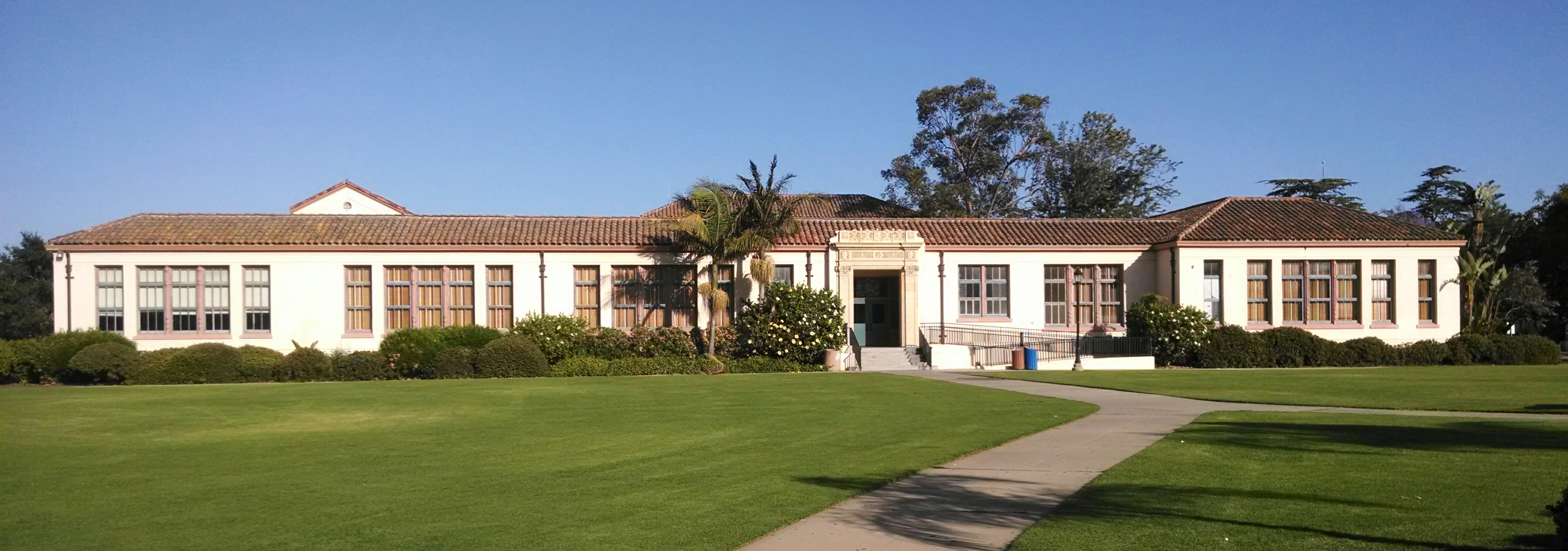
- Main Building is a designated landmark

Location
- 700 East Anapamu Street; Santa Barbara, California 93103; United States; 34°25′46″N 119°41′39″W

Information
- School type: Public, high school
- Motto: Once a Don, Always a Don
- Established: 1875; 151 years ago
- School district: Santa Barbara Unified School District
- Principal: Ed Gomez
- Teaching staff: 96.35 (FTE)
- Grades: 9–12
- Enrollment: 2,046 (2023-2024)
- Student to teacher ratio: 21.24
- Colors: Olive and gold
- Athletics conference: CIF Southern Section; Channel League
- Nickname: Dons
- Rivals: San Marcos High School, Dos Pueblos High School
- Newspaper: The Forge
- Yearbook: Olive and Gold
- Website: sbhs.sbunified.org

Santa Barbara Senior High School, "Home of the Dons," is situated on a sprawling 40-acre (160,000 m^{2}) campus in Santa Barbara, California, in the Santa Barbara Unified School District. Among the oldest high schools in California and one of five high schools in the District, Santa Barbara High School was established in 1875 at the corner of Anapamu and De La Vina, but relocated to its present Eastside site in 1924. Today, Santa Barbara High School has a diverse, near 65% minority enrollment of over 2000 pupils, 92 full-time teachers, and small learning academies, including Visual Arts and Design (VADA), Computer Science (CSA), and Multimedia Arts and Design (MAD). The school also features a performing arts department that employs professional designers, choreographers, musical directors and guest artists.

Due to a shortfall in state education funding, the school, a California historic landmark, relies on the Foundation for Santa Barbara High School to increase funds for academics, mental health and capital improvements, including renovation of the Peabody Stadium and new fields for track, football, soccer and lacrosse.

== History ==
In 1916, the Santa Barbara Board of Education, along with students and community leaders, launched a bond campaign to build a new expanded Santa Barbara High School, which was then located at the corner of Anapamu and De la Vina near downtown Santa Barbara. After a series of bond elections, construction started in 1922 to enlarge the school and move it into the Lower Eastside neighborhood of Santa Barbara, where it is now located at 700 East Anapamu Street.

Completed in 1924, the main high school building was designed by noted San Francisco-based architecture firm W.H. Weeks, which also designed Santa Barbara Junior High School and La Cumbre Junior High School. Along with McKinley Elementary School, designed by Winsor Soule & John Frederic Murphy Architects, all four schools have been characterized as 'architectural masterpieces' by American political scientist, Lanny Ebenstein. All four have been designated City of Santa Barbara historic landmarks

The class of 1924 was the first class to graduate from the 700 East Anapamu Street site, despite the fact that the students had not attended class there. On Thanksgiving Day, 1924, Frederick Forrest Peabody donated to the school a new football stadium, which the student body named Peabody Stadium in his honor. In 1925, the first group of seniors to attend classes there received their graduation diplomas.

In November 2005, its 18th-century Spanish Colonial Revival architectural style was named an official California and City historic landmark.

Until the establishment of San Marcos High School in 1958 and Dos Pueblos High School in 1966, Santa Barbara High School was the sole public high school to serve the Santa Barbara-Goleta community.

== Leadership ==
The current principal is Ed Gomez, who formally took the role on July 1, 2025 to begin for the 2025-2026 scholastic year. Gomez served as an assistant principal at the high school for two years and has worked as an administrator in the district since 2019. He previously taught at the secondary level for 27 years, including 20 years at Santa Paula High School. Gomez's predecessor, Fred Razo, served as principal from 2023 - 2025.

== Student body ==
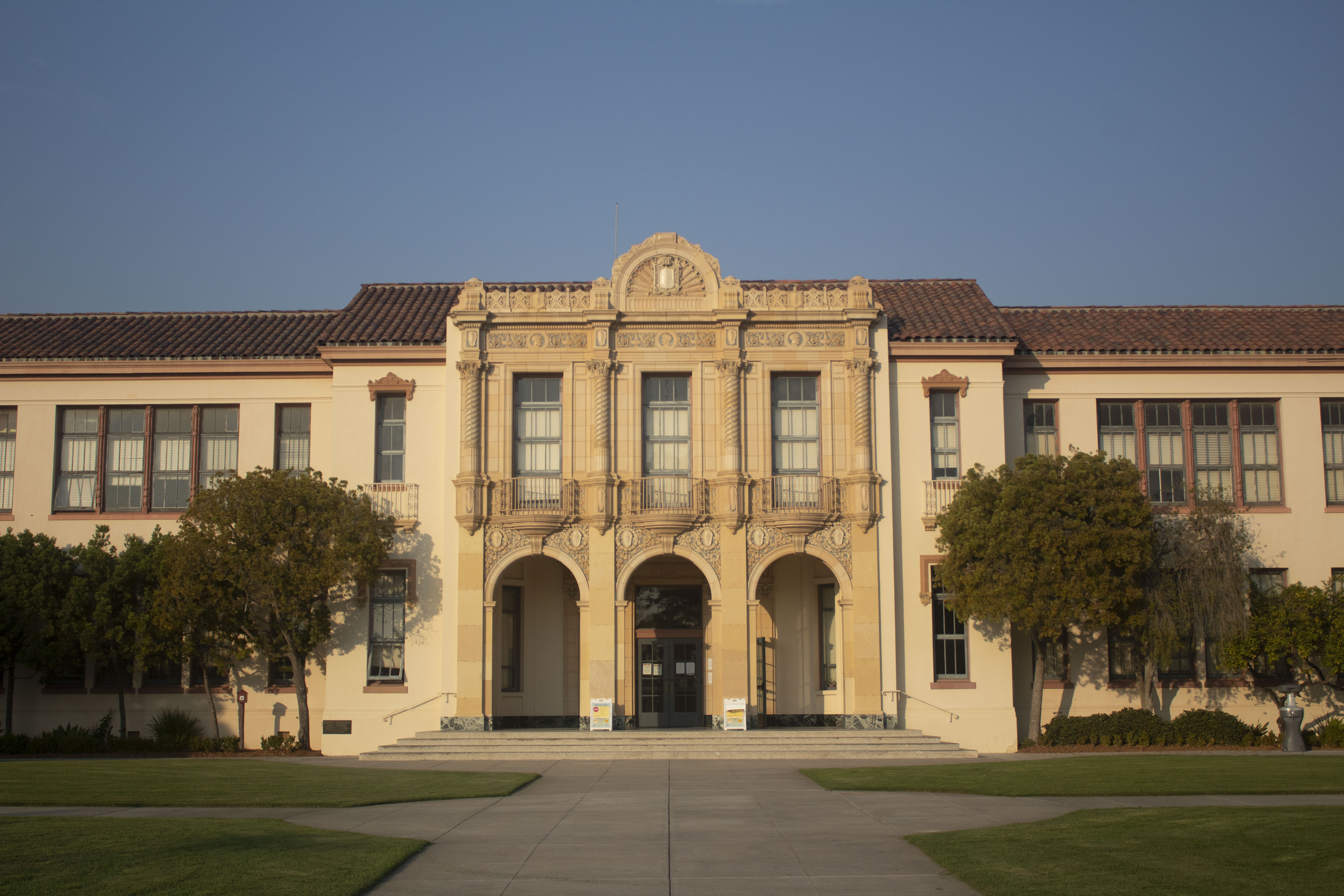
Santa Barbara High School: The oldest high school in Santa Barbara County.

According to the California Department of Education, in the 2023-2024 scholastic year, Santa Barbara High School had a total minority-identifying enrollment of 68%. In order by enrollment percentage, the student body's ethnic and racial demographics were reported as follows: 61.8% Hispanic or Latino, 31.1% White, 2.2% Two or More Races, 1.3% Asian, 0.7% African American, 0.4% American Indian or Alaska Native, 0.1% Filipino, and 0.1% Pacific Islander, with 2.3% not reporting.

A total of 61.9% of the student body is socioeconomically disadvantaged, defined as students who are either eligible for free or reduced priced school meals or have parents/guardians who did not receive a high school diploma A total of 6.6% of students are English learners.

== Academic Programs ==
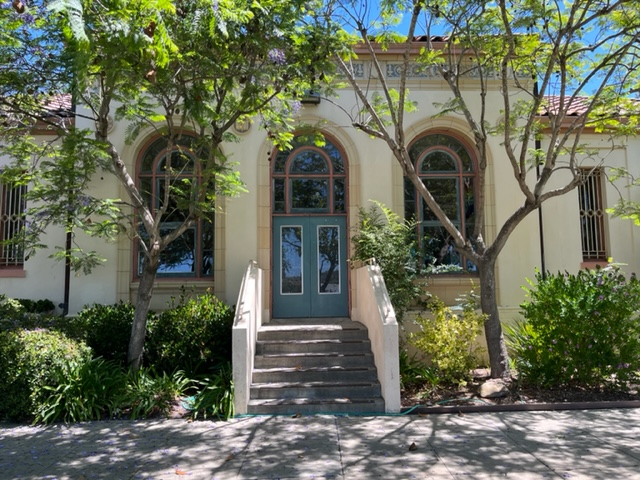
Exterior photo of Santa Barbara High School.

=== Academies ===
The school has three internal academy programs which group students into cohorts that attend many shared classes relating to the focus of each academy. Sometimes referred to as a 'school within a school' format, these academies include the Computer Science Academy (CSA), Multimedia Arts and Design (MAD), and Visual Arts and Design Academy (VADA).

==== Computer Science Academy (CSA) ====
Founded in 2012, the Computer Science Academy focuses on developing students' skills in computer science, coding, mathematics, and robotics with priority to real-world experience via partnership with regional universities and local technology companies. Coursework includes computational art, software design, mobile programming and app development, robotics, and 3-D printing.

In 2019, SBHS student and CSA member, Ella Onishuk, won the Aspirations in Computing award from the National Center for Women & Information Technology, while fellow CSA member, Joy Patterson, won an Honorable mention for development of an app with an interactive map of Santa Barbara intended to boost local tourism following the deadly 2018 Southern California mudflows.

==== Multimedia Arts and Design (MAD) ====
The MAD academy focuses on preparing students for careers in the fields of media arts and technology. Courses include filmmaking, photography, photo journalism, graphic design, and web design. The academy offers a 2,000 square foot film studio with a green screen as well as a 600 square foot photography studio with a white backdrop. Students are provided with professional equipment including industry-standard computers, editing software, cameras, lighting, sound, and grip equipment.

==== Visual Arts and Design Academy (VADA) ====
Founded in 1999, VADA provides a small learning community to students in grades 9-12 which integrates academic coursework with project-based instruction across a breadth of disciplines pertaining to visual art and design. The academy includes painting, drawing, graphic design, digital art, and photography coursework designed to prepare students for both collegiate study and work within design firms, and the creative business landscape.

In August, 2024 a new design lab and indoor-outdoor art studio complex was completed following a $6.5 million capital campaign which drew from a mix of state grant, local bond, and private donation moneys. The new 3,350 square foot facility doubled VADA's total dedicated campus space and includes modern 3D printing and laser cutting machinery.

== Academic performance ==
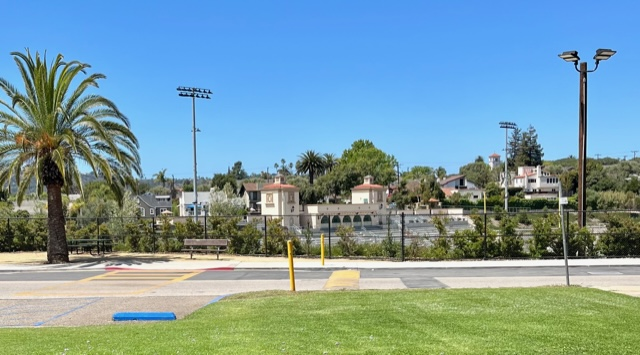
Santa Barbara High School. Peabody Stadium.

In 2022, U.S. News & World Report ranked Santa Barbara High School 3,566 out of 17,843 schools in the nation; 528 out of 1,603 public high schools ranked in California. With a graduation rate of 91%, a majority students at Santa Barbara High School took at least one Advanced Placement exam, though the passage rate on the AP exam was only 37%. Proficiency scores based on Smarter Balance tests were as follows:

- 37% Mathematics Proficiency
- 62% Reading Proficiency
- 39% Science Proficiency

In 2010, Newsweek's list of America's Best High Schools included Santa Barbara, San Marcos high school, and Dos Pueblos high school.

== Performing Arts ==
The Santa Barbara High Theater has been in operation continuously for over 100 years. The performing arts department, which partners with the Santa Barbara Theater Foundation, employs professional designers, choreographers, musical directors and guest artists to work with students. Students perform year-round in an 800-seat theater featuring state of the art lighting and sound. Past productions have included The Crucible, Chicago, 'Carrie, and Head Over Heels.

Former student participants in the performing arts program include Dana Costello (Jekyll & Hyde on Broadway), Jessica Adcock Love (Grace on Broadway). SBHS has had two finalists in the Youth Spotlight Awards (Geoffrey Hahn, runner-up, 2012 and Grant Bower, 2014).

== Athletics ==
Santa Barbara High School has a strong history of athletic achievement at the regional, state, and national level. SBHS offers 28 official sports programs (counting both boys and girls teams), split evenly between boys and girls sports. Each program fields some combination of Varsity, Junior Varsity, and Fresh-Soph (frosh) teams. Cheer and Competitive Sport Cheer are the only two sports which regularly feature unified mixed gender teams. SBHS is currently a member of the local Channel League conference, featuring 8 regional high schools. This league is slated to be reorganized for the 2026-2027 season.

The high school competes in the California Interscholastic Federation-Southern Section (CIF Southern Section) which as of 2024 assigns divisions (typically I - IV) per sport, based primarily on current season performance, rather than based strictly on enrollment as was previously done.

Table of Santa Barbara High School Sports by Season
Fall	Winter	Spring
Mixed Cheer; Boys and Girls Cross Country; Girls Golf; Girls Tennis; Girls Flag Football; Boys Football; Girls Volleyball (indoor); Boys Water Polo	Boys Basketball; Girls Basketball; Boys Soccer; Girls Soccer; Girls Water Polo; Mixed Wrestling	Boys Baseball; Mixed Competitive Sport Cheer; Boys Golf; Boys Lacrosse; Girls Lacrosse; Girls Softball; Boys Swimming/Dive; Girls Swimming/Dive; Boys Tennis; Boys and Girls Track and Field; Boys Volleyball (indoor); Girls Beach Volleyball

In addition to these programs, the Boys and Girls Surf Team, founded in 2002, is managed as an independent club affiliated with the high school. The team competes in regional and state competitions and boasts a locally renowned legacy including a Surf History Hall of Fame located in the high school's main building featuring alumni such as surfers Tom Curren, and Cole Robbins, and surfboard maker, Jon Pyzel. The school woodshop course also assists students in learning how to make and shape surfboards. Santa Barbara High School also fields a sailing team and ultimate frisbee team.

=== Recent Athletic Achievements ===
- 2025: The Surf team wins the overall team championship as well as the men's shortboard and men's longboard competitions for the Los Angeles-Santa Barbara division of the Scholastic Surf Series in Oceanside.
- 2024: Girls Tennis wins the CIF-SS Division 3 Championship
- 2023: Boys Cross Country wins the CIF Division 2 state championship
- 2022: The Surf Team wins the overall team championship and sweeps in all five categories, including men’s shortboard/longboard, women’s shortboard/longboard, and coed bodyboard.
- 2018: Boys Soccer wins the CIF Division 1 state championship.

=== Peabody Stadium renovation ===
A $39 million dollar renovation of Peabody Stadium was completed in 2020 with partial funding from the Foundation for Santa Barbara High School. Refurbished Olympic-quality fields adhere to CIF standards, allowing the school to host competitive meets, including track, football, lacrosse and international soccer tournaments with a notably large field.

== Student newspaper ==
The school's newspaper, The Forge, has been in continuous publication since 1914, making it the second-oldest high school newspaper to publish without interruption in California. Among the 2022 features were articles entitled "The Surreal World of Ukrainians in Santa Barbara" and "Why You Should Donate Your Hair to Wigs for Kids."

Former Forge editor Leon Litwack (class of 1947) is a Pulitzer Prize winner, retired UC Berkeley professor and author of books on slavery. Mary Claudia Nettles Madson, a former 1938 SBHS journalism student on The Forge, was among the first female UPI journalists. Manuel Unzueta (1968), a former cartoonist for The Forge, is a well-known Santa Barbara muralist who has painted murals at Bohnett Park and the Eastside Library.

== Traditions and community engagement ==
=== Painting the Cow ===
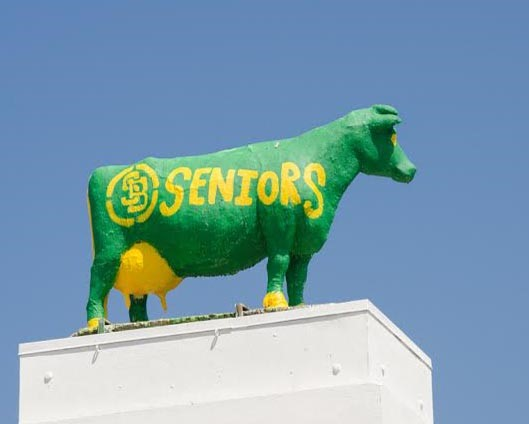
Bossie the cow, painted by SBHS students. The cow stood at the corner of Milpas and Canon Perdido streets until 2020.

It was a longstanding community tradition that current Santa Barbara High School students would paint a large cow statue, affectionately known as Bossy (or Bossie), which sat atop the building of the former Live Oak Dairy on the corner of Milpas and Canon Perdido streets. Installed in 1939, the cow statue was first surreptitiously decorated by local SBHS students in 1965 who added a sombrero, mask, poncho, and moniker, "Dons '67".

Over the years, painting the cow would become a rite of passage for successive classes of students who would repaint the cow for sports games, school events such as Prom or Formals, and graduation. For decades Bossy was a central figure in cross-town rivalries with neighboring high schools San Marcos and Dos Pueblos who would attempt to paint the cow their own school colors. This was especially true around the time of 'The Big Game', the annual regular season football game between Santa Barbara and San Marcos.

In August, 2020 Bossy collapsed seemingly due to failure of a front leg, though the true cause is subject to ongoing community speculation. The Santa Barbara High School Alumni Association unveiled a replacement Bossy on October 1, 2022 and placed it on the Santa Barbara High School campus.

=== Ethnic Studies ===
In 2018, the Santa Barbara Unified School Board voted unanimously to make ethnic studies coursework required for high school graduation by 2023—a date later extended to 2024. The decision came in large part as a result of a 3-year effort by the Santa Barbara Ethnic Studies Now! community advocacy group, led by SBHS alumna and community activist, Fabiola Gonzalez '19.

=== Mural ===
In collaboration with SBHS alumni, including local artist Manuel Unzueta, more than 20 current students participated in painting a 60-foot mural outside the campus cafeteria. The six-panel mural, titled ‘La Loteria De Vida" (The Lottery of Life) features symbols of Chicano and Chumash culture, while paying tribute to the history of Santa Barbara and the high school. Hundreds of people turned out for the mural's official unveiling in 2021.

== Foundation for Santa Barbara High School ==
To address a $3,000 shortfall in state per-pupil funding, the Foundation for Santa Barbara High School, a non-profit 501(c) 3, raises money to support academics, counseling, sports and other programs. During the COVID-19 pandemic, the Foundation paid for outdoor tents and air purifiers for classrooms and the school library, as well as distributed grants to families in need. The Foundation renovated an indoor-outdoor "Solarium" for a teachers' lounge and raised $5 million for the 2,300 seat Peabody Stadium renovation.

== Notable alumni ==
- Tanya Atwater, geophysicist, "Mother of Plate Tectonics"(1960)
- Dylan Axelrod, professional baseball pitcher for the Chicago White Sox of Major League Baseball
- Yeti Beats (aka Dave Sprecher), Grammy nominated producer (2000)
- Stephen Benton, pioneer in holographic imaging, and inventor of the rainbow hologram (1959)
- Timothy Bottoms, actor (lead, "Johnny Got His Gun), producer (1970)
- Josh Brolin, Academy award nominee actor
- Booker Brown, NFL football player
- Daryl Cagle, MSNBC.com's daily editorial cartoonist (1974)
- Clare Carey, actress (1985)
- Pearl Chase, pioneer in the fields of conservation, preservation, social services, and civic planning (1903)
- Kami Craig, Olympic silver medalist (2008), and gold medalist (2012); water polo (2005)
- Randall Cunningham, former NFL Philadelphia Eagles quarterback and All-Pro player (1981)
- Sam Cunningham, USC All-American, Rose Bowl MVP '73; College Football Hall of Fame '11; New England Patriots fullback (1969)
- Tom Curren, professional surfer (three time world champion), and musician (1982)
- Robert Denno, professor, entomology, butterfly ecologist (1945–2008)
- Thomas Dibblee, figure in geological and topographical work in mapping the state of California (1931)
- Lanny Ebenstein, American political scientist, economist and historian (1977, served as ASB President)
- Macduff Everton, American photographer, National Geographic
- Don Ford, former NBA Los Angeles Lakers and Cleveland Cavaliers player (1971)
- Al Geiberger, professional golfer, record score (59) in a PGA Tour event (1955)
- Eric Goldman, law professor
- Kevin Gowdy, baseball player in the Los Angeles Dodgers organization (2015)
- Martha Graham, pioneer of modern dance (1913)
- George Greenough, surfing pioneer (1960)
- Taylor Hackford, Academy award-winning filmmaker (1963)
- Brad Hall, Saturday Night Live news anchor (early years), creator of TV's The Single Guy, environmental activist (1972)
- Deacon Hill, quarterback for the Iowa Hawkeyes (2020)
- Diana M. Holland, U.S. Army major general
- Gary K. Hart, former California Secretary of Education and state legislator (1961)
- Karen Kane, fashion designer (1974)
- Ward Kimball, Disney animator, Academy Award for It's Tough to Be a Bird; creations include Jiminy Cricket, the Mad Hatter, and Pecos Bill (1932)
- Alonzo King, dancer and choreographer(1969)
- Karch Kiraly, three-time Olympic gold medalist (indoor 1984, 1988; beach, 1996) and professional volleyball great (1978)
- Bill Leavy, NFL referee Super Bowl XL (1965)
- Leon Litwack, Pulitizer Prize winner for History for his book Been in the Storm So Long (1947)
- Jordan Maron (aka Captain Sparklez), popular Youtuber (2010)
- Alma Martinez, Olympian for Mexico (2004), women's football (1999)
- Eddie Mathews, Baseball Hall of Famer (1949)
- Ross McMains, basketball coach
- Thalia Munro, Olympic bronze medalist (2004), water polo (2000)
- Floyd Norman, animator, writer, artist and cartoonist (1953)
- John Northrop, aviation (1913)
- Charles A. Ott Jr., United States Army Major General and Director of the Army National Guard (1937)
- Charles Schwab, founder of the world famous discount brokerage firm and innovative philanthropist (1955)
- Ron Shelton, writer/director of film including Bull Durham and White Men Can't Jump (1963)
- Chris Shiflett, lead guitarist for the Foo Fighters
- Ryan Spilborghs, Major League Baseball outfielder (1998)
- John Whittemore, World's Oldest Athlete (1917)
- Jamaal Wilkes, former NBA Los Angeles Lakers and Golden State Warriors player with four NBA Championships (1970)

== Alma mater ==
The school's alma mater is "Santa Barbara, Hail to Thee!". It was written by Doris Holt, Class of 1944.
