= Santa Barbara Unified School District =

School district in California, United States

Santa Barbara Unified School District Spanish: Distrito Escolar Unificado de Santa Bárbara

Address
- 720 Santa Barbara Street Santa Barbara, California, 93101; United States

District information
- Type: Public
- Grades: K–12
- Established: June 6, 1866
- Budget: US$19,397,597 (2010)
- NCES District ID: 0601414

Students and staff
- Students: 13,188 (2020–2021)
- Teachers: 604.23 (FTE)
- Staff: 904.64 (FTE)
- Student–teacher ratio: 21.83:1

Other information
- Teachers' unions: Santa Barbara Teachers Association; California Teachers Association
- Website: www.sbunified.org

The Santa Barbara Unified School District (Spanish: Distrito Escolar Unificado de Santa Bárbara) is the main public school district that serves Santa Barbara and Goleta, California. On January 12, 2011, the board of education unanimously approved a resolution to reorganize the Santa Barbara Elementary and Secondary School Districts into a single unified school district. The changeover began July 1, 2011.

From 2015 to 2026 the district saw a roughly 16% decline in overall enrollment, reported as being due chiefly to increased cost of living and declining local birthrates

== History ==
First attempts at creating public schools began in Santa Barbara after the founding of the Presidio in the 1790s, with mixed success. But as Robert Christian wrote in his thesis on the history of the district, "...on June 6, 1866, the Santa Barbara School District was formed. The schools were no longer administered by the County Superintendent, but in complete control of the electorate of the city. In 1866, Alpheus B. Thompson, County Superintendent reported that there were three school districts in the County: San Buenaventura, Montecito, and Santa Barbara. The census showed that there were 1,243 children between the ages of five and fifteen residing in the County, with only 325 pupils enrolled in schools, plus forty-one enrolled in private schools. Each district had two schools, with the length of the school year varying from three to five months. The teachers’ salaries varied from $30 to $50 per month, with the Santa Barbara district paying a total of $1,165.25."

== Food service ==
In 2018, SBUSD was reported as being the first school district in the United States to ban processed meats from its school meal program with officials attributing the decision to evidence linking processed meats to cancer. In 2025 the district expanded its free summer meal program in order to supplement local nonprofit food pantry supplies following cancellation of USDA funding to them.

== Technology Policies ==
On July 21, 2026 SBUSD adopted a 'Tech with Intent' board resolution, establishing instructional priorities for purposeful technology use.

The resolution includes updates to acceptable use policies, student access to YouTube and other Google Services, operational improvements, after-school device access, screen time and device guidance, student device policies, and instructional expectations.

=== Timeline for Policy Development ===
SBUSD outlined a tentative timeline for policy development on July 21, 2026.

Date	Plan
July 21, 2026	The board formally approved the board resolution to establish instructional priorities.
August 25, 2026	Present an Update on the Technology with Intent policy development process.
September 14, 2026	Post the revised Board Policy for community review and feedback through a survey.
September 29, 2026	Review community recommendations regarding the draft policy, continue refining it, and provide updates to the Board.
October 13, 2026	Provide and recommend adoption of the Technology with Intent Board Policy.

== Schools ==
=== Elementary schools ===
- Adams Elementary School
- Adelante Charter School
- Cleveland Elementary School
- Franklin Elementary School
- Harding University Partnership School
- McKinley Elementary School
- Monroe Elementary School
- Peabody Charter School
- Roosevelt Elementary School
- Santa Barbara Charter School
- Santa Barbara Community Academy
- Washington Elementary School

=== Junior high schools ===
- Goleta Valley Junior High School
- La Colina Junior High School
- La Cumbre Junior High School
- Santa Barbara Junior High School

=== High schools ===
- Alta Vista Alternative High School
- Dos Pueblos High School
- La Cuesta Continuation High School
- San Marcos High School
- Santa Barbara High School
