= National Register of Historic Places listings in Santa Barbara County, California =

Location of Santa Barbara County in California

This is a list of the National Register of Historic Places listings in Santa Barbara County, California.

This is intended to be a complete list of the properties and districts on the National Register of Historic Places in Santa Barbara County, California, United States. Latitude and longitude coordinates are provided for many National Register properties and districts; these locations may be seen together in an online map.

There are 52 properties and districts listed on the National Register in the county, including 8 National Historic Landmarks.

This National Park Service list is complete through NPS recent listings posted October 30, 2026.

== Current listings ==
	Name on the Register	Image	Date listed	Location	City or town	Description
1	Acacia Lodge	Acacia Lodge	July 9, 1997 (#97000750)	109 Miramar Ave. 34°25′22″N 119°37′49″W	Santa Barbara	
2	Andalucia Building	Andalucia Building	December 22, 1999 (#99001592)	316-324 State St. 34°24′57″N 119°41′37″W	Santa Barbara	
3	Ballard Adobes		January 6, 2025 (#100011216)	2411 Alamo Pintado Road. 34°39′12″N 120°06′58″W	Ballard	
4	Campbell No. 2 Archeological Site		January 25, 1993 (#92001755)	Address Restricted	Goleta	
5	Eastern Sierra Madre Ridge Archeological District		December 19, 1978 (#78000779)	Address Restricted	New Cuyama	
6	El Paseo and Casa de la Guerra	El Paseo and Casa de la Guerra	February 2, 1977 (#77000346)	808-818 State St., 813-819 Anacapa St., and 9-25 E. de la Guerra St. 34°25′14″N 119°41′57″W	Santa Barbara	El Paseo and Casa de la Guerra
7	Faith Mission	Faith Mission	January 11, 1982 (#82002269)	409 State St. 34°24′58″N 119°41′41″W	Santa Barbara	Designed by Peter J. Barber
8	Goleta Depot	Goleta Depot	January 18, 2002 (#01001457)	300 N. Los Carneros Rd. 34°26′33″N 119°51′09″W	Goleta	A 1901 Southern Pacific train station, now located at the South Coast Railroad Museum
9	Rafael Gonzalez House	Rafael Gonzalez House	April 15, 1970 (#70000149)	835 Laguna St. 34°25′27″N 119°41′45″W	Santa Barbara	A National Historic Landmark
10	Hammond's Estate Site	Hammond's Estate Site	May 19, 1978 (#78000782)	5 miles east of Santa Barbara, in Montecito; 34°25′00″N 119°38′09″W	Santa Barbara	Remnants of a wealthy estate located within a former Native American burial ground.
11	Allan Herschell 3-Abreast Carousel	Allan Herschell 3-Abreast Carousel	April 13, 2000 (#00000363)	223 E. Cabrillo Blvd. 34°24′54″N 119°41′10″W	Santa Barbara	
12	Hill-Carrillo Adobe	Hill-Carrillo Adobe	January 14, 1986 (#86000778)	11 E. Carrillo St. 34°25′19″N 119°42′06″W	Santa Barbara	
13	Thomas Hope House	Thomas Hope House	December 1, 1978 (#78000783)	399 Nogal Dr. 34°26′06″N 119°46′15″W	Santa Barbara	Designed by Peter J. Barber
14	Janssens-Orella-Birk Building	Janssens-Orella-Birk Building	July 16, 1987 (#87001170)	1029-1031 State St. 34°25′20″N 119°42′11″W	Santa Barbara	
15	Jimmy's Oriental Gardens and Chung Family House	Jimmy's Oriental Gardens and Chung Family House	May 14, 2026 (#100012928)	126 East Canon Perdido Street and 126 East Canon Perdido Street #B; 34°25′20″N 119°41′54″W	Santa Barbara	
16	La Purisima Mission	La Purisima Mission	April 15, 1970 (#70000147)	4 mi. E of Lompoc, near jct. of CA 1 and 150; 34°40′31″N 120°25′19″W	Lompoc	A National Historic Landmark
17	Lompoc Public Library	Lompoc Public Library	December 10, 1990 (#90001818)	200 S. H St. 34°38′14″N 120°27′27″W	Lompoc	Now a museum.
18	Lompoc Veterans Memorial Building	Lompoc Veterans Memorial Building	September 19, 2016 (#16000664)	100 E. Locust Ave. 34°37′57″N 120°27′28″W	Lompoc	
19	Los Alamos Ranch House	Los Alamos Ranch House	April 15, 1970 (#70000148)	3 mi. W of Los Alamos on old U.S. 101; 34°45′10″N 120°19′20″W	Los Alamos	A National Historic Landmark
20	Los Banos del Mar	Los Banos del Mar	December 24, 1992 (#92001726)	401 Shoreline Dr. 34°24′28″N 119°41′38″W	Santa Barbara	
21	Madulce Guard Station and Site		December 11, 1979 (#79000547)	40 mi. N. of Santa Barbara; 34°42′11″N 119°34′42″W	Santa Barbara	Destroyed by fire in 1999.
22	Minerva Club of Santa Maria	Minerva Club of Santa Maria	September 20, 1984 (#84001193)	127 W. Boone St. 34°56′51″N 120°26′14″W	Santa Maria	
23	Mission La Purísima at 'Amuwu District		October 2, 2023 (#100009394)	2295 Purisima Rd. 34°40′11″N 120°25′15″W	Lompoc	
24	Mission de la Purisima Concepcion de Maria Santisima Site	Mission de la Purisima Concepcion de Maria Santisima Site	May 5, 1978 (#78000775)	Bounded by Locust Ave., city limits, E and G Sts. 34°37′55″N 120°27′23″W	Lompoc	
25	Mission Santa Ines	Mission Santa Ines	March 8, 1999 (#99000630)	E side of Solvang, S of CA 246; 34°35′37″N 120°08′14″W	Solvang	A National Historic Landmark District
26	Painted Cave	Painted Cave	December 5, 1972 (#72000256)	Address Restricted	Santa Barbara	
27	Point Conception Light Station	Point Conception Light Station	February 25, 1981 (#81000176)	U.S. Coast Guard Light Station; 34°26′55″N 120°28′15″W	Santa Barbara	
28	Point Sal Ataje		November 21, 2002 (#02001392)	Address Restricted	Point Sal Highlands	
29	Rattlesnake Canyon Bridge	Rattlesnake Canyon Bridge	January 17, 2017 (#100000465)	1819 Las Canoas Rd. 34°27′27″N 119°41′32″W	Santa Barbara	
30	Royal Theater		March 10, 2022 (#100007474)	848 Guadalupe St. 34°58′10″N 120°34′25″W	Guadalupe	
31	Saint Paul African Methodist Episcopal Church, Santa Barbara		January 21, 2025 (#100011289)	502 Olive Street; 34°25′20″N 119°41′24″W	Santa Barbara	
32	San Marcos Rancho		April 26, 1979 (#79000548)	Address Restricted	Santa Barbara	
33	San Miguel Island Archeological District		September 12, 1979 (#79000258)	Address Restricted	Santa Barbara	
34	Santa Barbara Club	Santa Barbara Club	May 13, 2019 (#100003919)	1105 Chapala St. 34°25′17″N 119°42′17″W	Santa Barbara	Clubhouse of club founded in 1892
35	Santa Barbara County Courthouse	Santa Barbara County Courthouse	January 23, 1981 (#81000177)	1100 Anacapa St. 34°25′27″N 119°42′09″W	Santa Barbara	A National Historic Landmark
36	Santa Barbara Island Archeological District		September 12, 1979 (#79000259)	Address Restricted	Santa Barbara	
37	Santa Barbara Mission	Santa Barbara Mission	October 15, 1966 (#66000237)	2201 Laguna St. 34°26′16″N 119°42′50″W	Santa Barbara	A National Historic Landmark
38	Santa Barbara Presidio	Santa Barbara Presidio	November 26, 1973 (#73000455)	Roughly bounded by Carrillo, Garden, De la Guerra and Anacapa Sts. 34°25′21″N 119°41′50″W	Santa Barbara	
39	Santa Barbara Veterans Memorial Building	Santa Barbara Veterans Memorial Building	March 22, 2016 (#16000097)	112 W. Cabrillo St. 34°24′39″N 119°41′27″W	Santa Barbara	Remodeled in 1937 in the Spanish Colonial Revival style from a 1927 building
40	Santa Cruz Island Archeological District		January 30, 1980 (#80000405)	Address Restricted	Santa Barbara	Boundary increase approved December 6, 2021
41	Santa Rosa Island Archeological District		July 18, 2022 (#100007896)	Address Restricted	Santa Rosa Island vicinity	
42	Joseph and Lucy Foster Sexton House	Joseph and Lucy Foster Sexton House	February 5, 1992 (#91002033)	5490 Hollister Ave. 34°26′09″N 119°48′55″W	Santa Barbara	Italianate, designed by Peter J. Barber
43	Southern Pacific Train Depot	Southern Pacific Train Depot	August 2, 2006 (#06000658)	209 State St. 34°24′49″N 119°41′35″W	Santa Barbara	
44	Space Launch Complex 10	Space Launch Complex 10	June 23, 1986 (#86003511)	Vandenberg Air Force Base; 34°45′55″N 120°37′20″W	Lompoc	A National Historic Landmark
45	SS Yankee Blade		May 16, 1991 (#91000564)	Off the coast of Vandenberg Air Force base, near Honda Point. 34°36′12″N 120°39′03″W	Lompoc	Wreckage of a steamship during the California Gold Rush.
46	St. Vincent Orphanage and School Building	St. Vincent Orphanage and School Building	June 2, 1982 (#82002270)	925 De La Vina St. 34°25′08″N 119°42′15″W	Santa Barbara	
47	Steedman Estate	Steedman Estate	January 29, 1987 (#87000002)	1387 E. Valley Rd. 34°26′10″N 119°38′12″W	Montecito	National Historic Landmark designation January 16, 2009
48	Stow House	Stow House	September 28, 2000 (#00001166)	304 N. Los Carneros Rd. 34°26′35″N 119°51′06″W	Goleta	
49	US Post Office-Santa Barbara Main	US Post Office-Santa Barbara Main	January 11, 1985 (#85000138)	836 Anacapa St. 34°25′18″N 119°41′56″W	Santa Barbara	
50	USCGC McCulloch (coast guard cutter) Shipwreck	USCGC McCulloch (coast guard cutter) Shipwreck	April 22, 2021 (#100006401)	Off Point Conception; 34°27′22″N 120°30′00″W	Conception vicinity	
51	Val Verde	Val Verde	March 31, 1995 (#95000359)	2549 Sycamore Canyon Rd. 34°26′27″N 119°38′58″W	Montecito	Santa Barbara County landmark number: 38 Also known as: Dias Felices, Henry Dater house, Wright Ludington house, Dr. Warren Austin home
52	Virginia Hotel	Virginia Hotel	March 31, 2000 (#00000295)	17 and 23 W. Haley St. 34°24′58″N 119°41′46″W	Santa Barbara	

== See also ==
- List of National Historic Landmarks in California
- National Register of Historic Places listings in California
- California Historical Landmarks in Santa Barbara County, California
- City of Santa Barbara Historic Landmarks
