= Santa Barbara Beach =

Santa Barbara Beach may refer to:

- East Beach (Santa Barbara), a beach in the city of Santa Barbara, California
- West Beach (Santa Barbara), a beach in the city of Santa Barbara, California
- Santa Barbara Beach, Curaçao, a beach on the Caribbean island of Curaçao
- Playa de Santa Bárbara, a beach in Andalusia, Spain
