= Syuxtun Village =

- Ambassador Park
- Location within California Location within the United States
- Location: 100 West Cabrillo Blvd, Santa Barbara, CA
- Coordinates: 34°24′38″N 119°41′30″W
- Owner: City of Santa Barbara
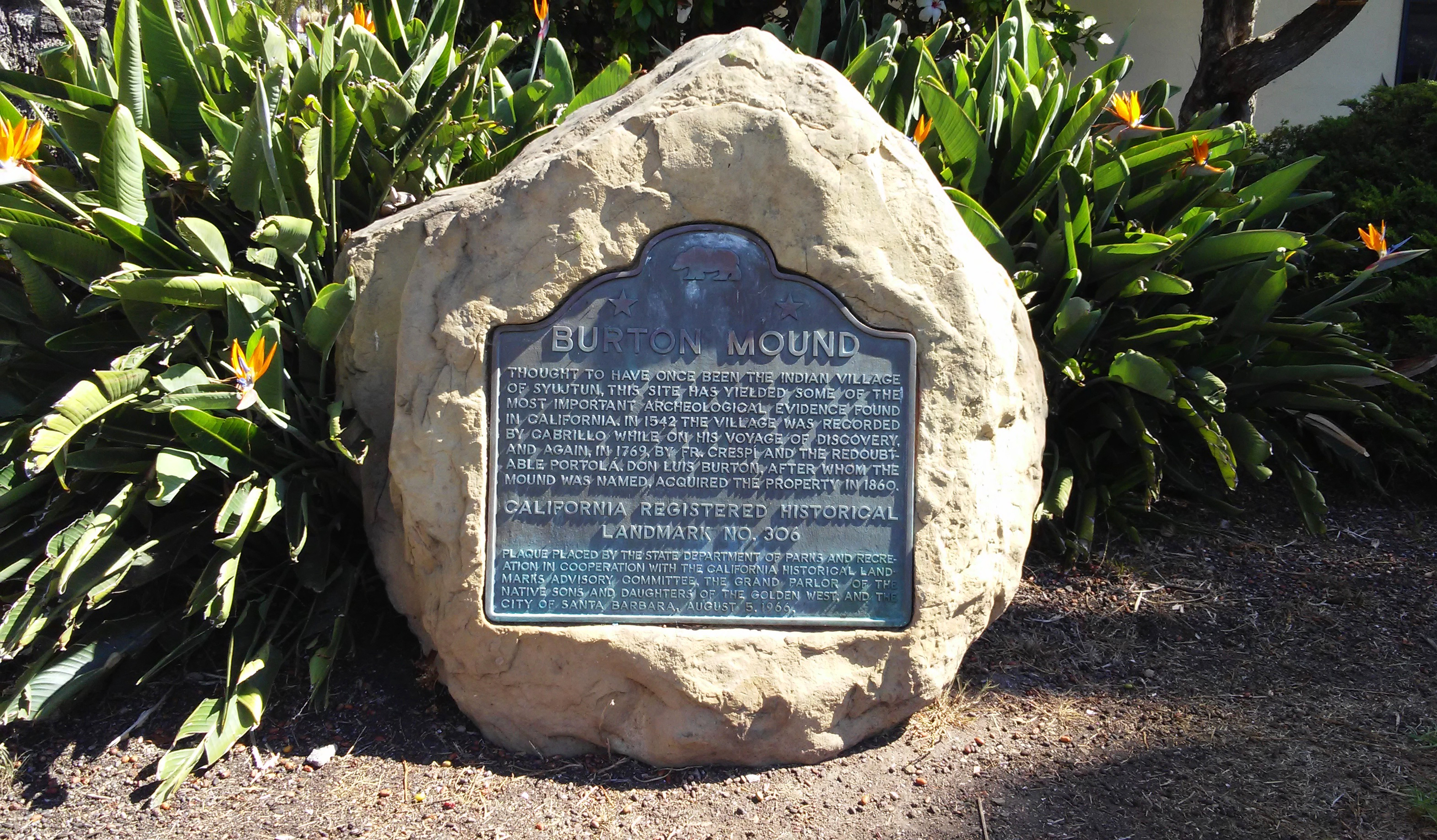
- California Historical Landmark Plaque in Ambassador Park
- Location: Ambassador Park, Santa Barbara, California

California Historical Landmark
- Official name: Burton Mound
- Designated: July 12, 1939
- Reference no.: 306

Syuxtun (also known as Syujtun) is a former Chumash village in Santa Barbara, California, United States. Recognized as Burton Mound, a California Historical Landmark, the site is administered by the city as Ambassador Park. The Native American village was encountered in 1542 by Juan Rodríguez Cabrillo. The village was also visited and documented by Juan Crespí and Gaspar de Portolà. The California Department of Parks and Recreation has acknowledged that Burton Mound has "yielded some of the most important archeological evidence found in California".

== History ==
As of 1782, the site was "one of the largest Chumash villages on the South Coast." The village, then called Syujtun, or Syuxtun, was visited by Gaspar de Portolà around August 1769. Portolà's party stated that the village was the largest out of all they visited up to that point, and that at least 600 people lived there. A party member stated: "In no other place had we met natives so affectionate and good natured."

The entire village had disappeared by the early 1830s. By 1800, there were about 120 people living there. Most of the Chumash had died from Spanish introduced diseases or become "members" of Mission Santa Barbara. A large building was built on site, which stored hide made from cattle. The property was bought by Joseph John Chapman in 1833. He was a former employee of Hippolyte Bouchard. Chapman helped construct Mission San Gabriel Arcángel. In 1860, the property was purchased by Lewis T. Burton. According to Walter A. Hawley, "Formerly large numbers of otter existed in the waters of Santa Barbara Channel, and as their skins were of a finer quality than the skins of those found elsewhere on the coast, they were hunted persistently by both Russians and Americans. Among the latter was Louis F. Burton, who arrived in 1831 and subsequently married Antonia Carrillo. He was a well-known hunter and trapper, and for years lived in a picturesque adobe overlooking the ocean from the crest of Burton's Mound, which was named after him." Burton became a major figure in Santa Barbara, opening a series of businesses in the town, including a post office, general store, and orchards. He died in 1879.

In January 1903, the property became integrated into the Potter Hotel, a luxury hotel with 600 rooms. In April 1921, the hotel, then known as the Ambassador, was destroyed in a fire and not rebuilt. At this time, the property became a curious factor for archaeologists. John P. Harrington was in charge of excavating the property on behalf of the Smithsonian Institution. He started the excavation in the spring of 1923 and over 2,500 objects were uncovered by the end of summer that year. The objects from that excavation reside in the National Museum of the American Indian. The pathway to the hotel between Cabrillo Boulevard and Mason Street was given to the city in 1924. Recognized as a city landmark, the site within Ambassador Park was named a California Historical Landmark on July 12, 1939.

=== Sulfur spring ===
There was once a natural sulfurated spring at Burton Mound, "between Chapala and Bath Streets...near the Joseph Chapman adobe."

== Today ==
The site is located near West Beach. The area comprises commercial and residential businesses.

== See also ==
- History of Santa Barbara, California
- California Historical Landmarks in Santa Barbara County, California
