= Peter J. Barber =

American architect

Peter Josiah Barber
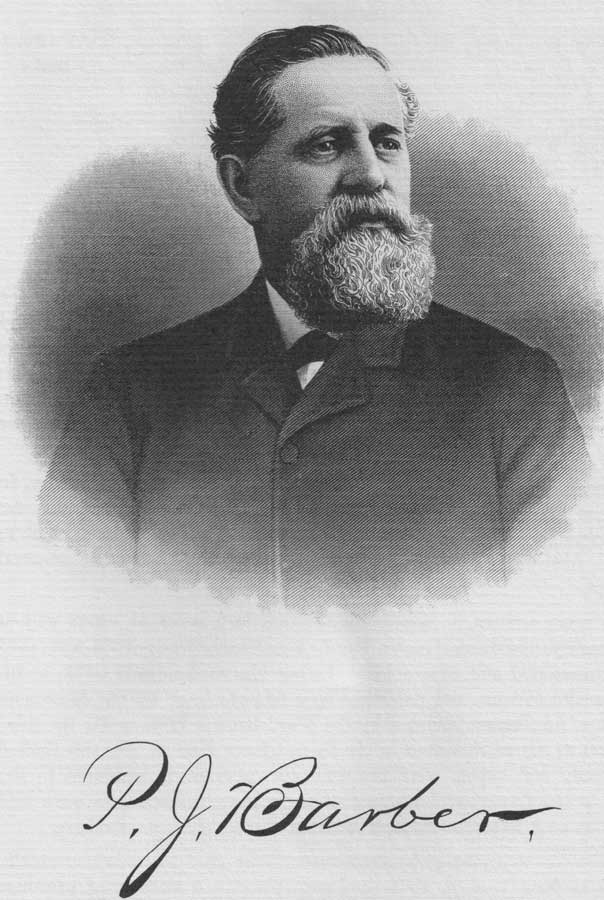
- Born: November 26, 1830; Nelson Township, Portage County, Ohio, U.S.
- Died: January 27, 1905 (aged 74); Santa Barbara, California, U.S.
- Occupation: Architect
- Spouse: Mary J. Wheaton (m. 1859)
- Practice: P. J. Barber, Architect
- Buildings: Arlington Hotel; second Santa Barbara County Courthouse; Thomas Hope House; Joseph and Lucy Foster Sexton House; Faith Mission

Peter Josiah Barber (November 26, 1830 – January 27, 1905) was an American carpenter, architect, and prominent citizen of Santa Barbara, California. A native of Ohio, he was drawn to California during the Gold Rush in 1852 and settled in Santa Barbara in 1869, where he established himself as the city's foremost architect and served as postmaster and for two terms as mayor. His works include the Arlington Hotel, the second County Courthouse, and the original Santa Barbara Cottage Hospital, as well as several private houses. As mayor, he was also responsible for public works projects, most prominently the tree-lined boulevard, now called Cabrillo Boulevard, at East Beach. Three of the buildings he designed are listed on the National Register of Historic Places.

== Life and career ==
Barber was born in Nelson Township, Portage County, Ohio on November 26, 1830, and grew up in the vicinity of Windham Township, also in Portage County, 48 miles southeast of Cleveland. While in Windham, he apprenticed as a cabinetmaker, then moved to Cleveland in 1849 to work in furniture businesses there. He stayed here for about three years doing cabinet-making and carpentry before being drawn to California during the Gold Rush.

In 1851, following the death of his parents, Barber left Cleveland to return to Nelson, where he collected his share of the family property and joined a group of friends bound for California. He departed from the Port of New York in February 1852 on a voyage to Panama, where he encountered 9,000 other travelers waiting to catch ships to California. He obtained passage on the ship Clarissa Andrews and spent the next 65 days sailing to San Francisco, then made his way to Marysville, California, where he and friends made attempts at gold mining for the next three years, before giving up and returning to San Francisco to become a carpenter. He gradually learned drafting skills and obtained work in the offices of architects Prosper Huerne (1820–1892) and, later, Reuben S. Clark (d. 1866), where he worked as a draftsman on the current California State Capitol building. In 1859, he married Mary J. Wheaton, with whom he had four children.

Barber settled in Santa Barbara in 1869 as the town was growing from a sleepy village to a resort center. His image of a gentleman-architect attracted many of the newly rich in town, and he designed structures for major local figures such as Mortimer Cook and William Welles Hollister. Working mainly in the Italianate style, Barber's buildings were a symbol of the affluence and importance of the town's leaders. Among his several commissions in the 1870s were the Santa Barbara College, the Lincoln House (now the Upham Hotel), the second Santa Barbara County Courthouse, and the remodeling of the original Lobero Theatre. In 1874 he designed the Arlington Hotel, competing with several San Francisco architects for the commission, and it became the center of Santa Barbara's social life.

Between 1874 and 1880 Barber had his own building supply service and part ownership of a lumber concern. From 1880 to 1881, and again in 1890 to 1891, Barber was the mayor of Santa Barbara, as well as Postmaster from 1882 to 1886. During his latter term as mayor he won voter approval for the bond measure that beautified Cabrillo Boulevard, named after Juan Rodríguez Cabrillo, which runs along East Beach. Few buildings of his dated past 1893 can be found.

Barber died at his desk on Friday, January 27, 1905, in the evening at the age of 74. The Channel City Lodge of the Odd Fellows handled his funeral services. Several local figures attended his funeral, including members from the Daughters of Rebekah, the Starr King Post of the Grand Army of the Republic, and the Ancient Order of United Workmen.

== Legacy ==
Barber was considered Santa Barbara's most professional architect of the time, as well as one of its leading citizens. Many of the buildings he designed were destroyed by the 1925 Santa Barbara earthquake, but a number are still standing, regarded as the finest examples of Victorian architecture in Santa Barbara. Three works have been listed on the National Register of Historic Places: the Thomas Hope House in Hope Ranch (listed in 1978), Faith Mission in Downtown Santa Barbara (listed in 1982), and the Joseph and Lucy Foster Sexton House in Goleta (listed in 1992). The Mortimer Cook House, the Hunt-Stambach House, Faith Mission, and the Upham Hotel have been listed as City of Santa Barbara Historic Landmarks.

Materials relating to his life are held at the Bancroft Library at the University of California, Berkeley.

== Works ==
An illustrated catalog of Barber's work appears in the second part of "The Santa Barbara of Peter J. Barber", by Herbert W. Andree, in Noticias, vol. 21 no. 3, fall 1975. Many of his works also appear in Andree and Young, Santa Barbara Architecture.

- Mortimer Cook House, 1407 Chapala Street, 1871–72. A City of Santa Barbara Historic Landmark. Now the Institute of World Culture
- Lincoln House (now Upham Hotel), 1404 De La Vina Street, 1871–72
- Santa Barbara College (later Ellwood Hotel and San Marcos Hotel), southwest corner of State and Anapamu Streets, 1873 (demolished in 1913)
- Sexton House, 131 E. Arrellaga Street, c. 1874 (attributed)
- First Presbyterian Church, 1117 State Street, 1874 (demolished)
- Arlington Hotel, State Street, southwest side, between Sola and Victoria Streets (current site of Arlington Theatre), 1875 (destroyed by fire in 1909)
- Episcopal Church, 2020 Chapala Street, 1875 (attributed)
- Thomas Hope House, 399 Nogal Drive, Hope Ranch, 1875
- Gaspar Oreña House, 1990 Laguna Street (current site of Roosevelt Elementary School), 1878 (demolished 1923)
- Hunt-Stambach House, 821 Coronel Street, 1879. This house has been moved three times, when its three former addresses were threatened by redevelopment in 1890, 1955, and 1965
- Joseph and Lucy Foster Sexton House, 5490 Hollister Avenue, Goleta, 1880
- Thomas Dibblee House (also known as Punta del Castillo or Dibblee's Castle), the Mesa overlooking West Beach, Santa Barbara, 1887 (demolished 1932). Dibblee was the owner of Rancho San Julian and grandfather of the geologist Thomas Wilson Dibblee Jr.
- Arlington Hotel Annex, West Victoria and Chapala Streets, northern corner (current site of Santa Barbara Public Market), 1887 (demolished following 1925 earthquake)
- Faith Mission (now Hotel Savoy), 409 State Street, 1889
- Santa Barbara Cottage Hospital (original building), southeast corner of Bath and Fourth Avenue, 1891 (demolished)
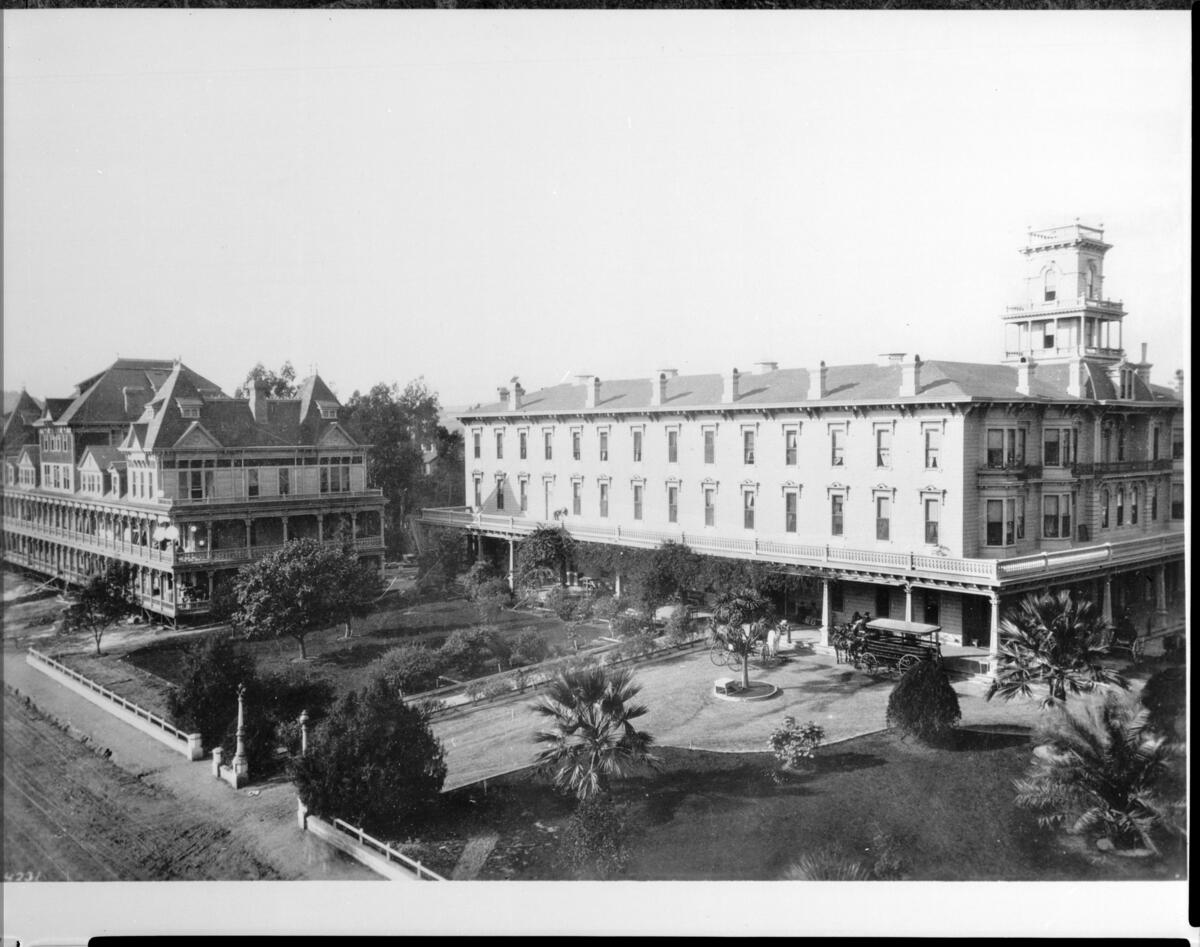
Arlington Hotel

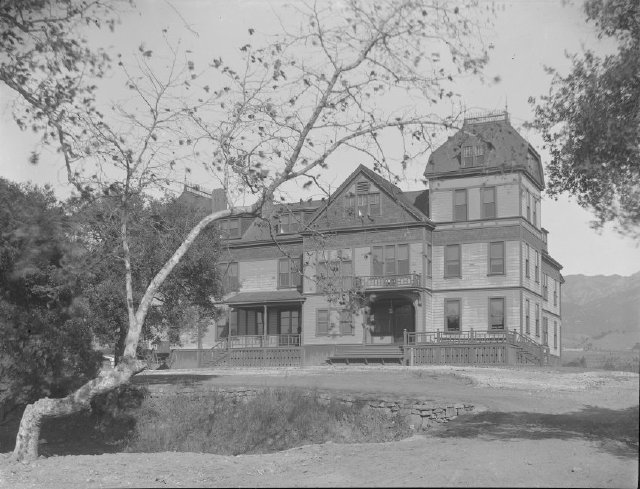
Santa Barbara Cottage Hospital

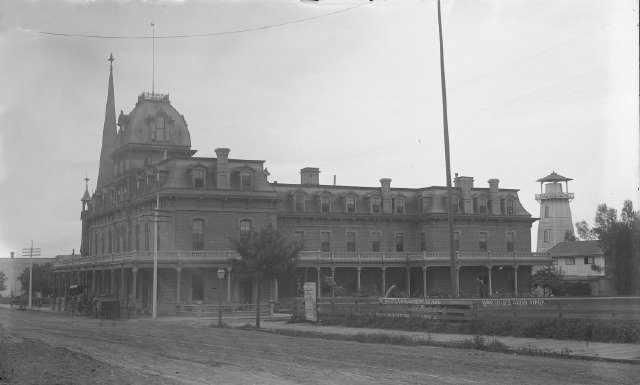
Ellwood Hotel

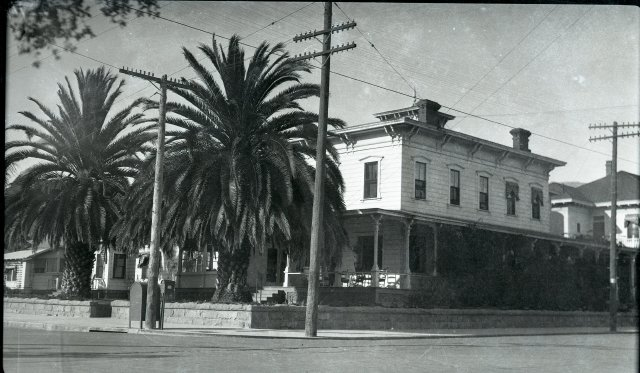
Upham Hotel

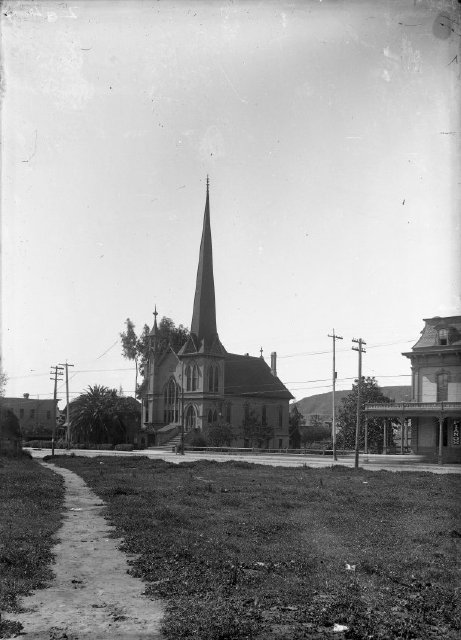
First Presbyterian Church

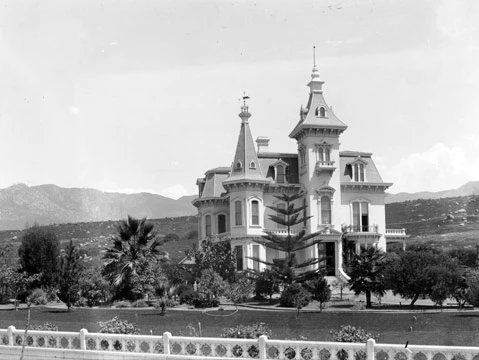
Gaspar Oreña House

== See also ==
- History of Santa Barbara, California
- National Register of Historic Places listings in Santa Barbara County, California
- City of Santa Barbara Historic Landmarks
