= California Historical Landmarks in Santa Barbara County =

List table of the properties and districts listed as California Historical Landmarks within Santa Barbara County, California.

- Note: Click the "Map of all coordinates" link to the right to view a Google map of all properties and districts with latitude and longitude coordinates in the table below.

== Listings ==
Image		Landmark name	Location	City or town	Summary
Burton Mound	306	Burton Mound	129 W. Mason St. at Burton Circle; 34°24′40″N 119°41′32″W	Santa Barbara	A second plaque is at 1000 Carpinteria Ave.
Carpinteria and Indian Village of Mishopshnow	535	Carpinteria and Indian Village of Mishopshnow	Carpinteria Valley Museum of History, 950 Maple Ave; 34°23′33″N 119°30′39″W	Carpinteria	
Carrillo Adobe	721	Carrillo Adobe	11 E Carrillo St. 34°25′19″N 119°42′06″W	Santa Barbara	Also on the NRHP list as NPS-86000778
Casa de la Guerra	307	Casa de la Guerra	808-818 State St., 813-819 Anacapa St., and 9-25 E. de la Guerra St. 34°25′13″N 119°41′57″W	Santa Barbara	Also on the NRHP list as NPS-77000346
Chapel of San Ramon	877	Chapel of San Ramon	Tepusquet and Foxen Canyon Rds. 34°50′52″N 120°14′27″W	Santa Maria	
Covarrubias Adobe	308	Covarrubias Adobe	715 N Santa Barbara St. 34°25′16″N 119°41′48″W	Santa Barbara	
Gaviota Pass	248	Gaviota Pass	U.S. Route 101; 34°29′07″N 120°13′43″W	Goleta	
Hastings Adobe	559	Hastings Adobe	412 W Montecito St. 34°24′37″N 119°41′52″W	Santa Barbara	Also called the Trussell-Winchester Adobe.
Mission La Purisima Concepción	340	Mission La Purisima Concepción	La Purisima Mission State Historic Park; 34°40′14″N 120°25′15″W	Lompoc	Also on the NRHP list as NPS-70000147
Lobero Theatre	361	Lobero Theatre	33 E Canon Perdido St. 34°25′18″N 119°42′00″W	Santa Barbara	
Mission Santa Barbara	309	Mission Santa Barbara	2201 Laguna St. 34°26′18″N 119°42′50″W	Santa Barbara	Also on the NRHP list as NPS-66000237
Mission Santa Inés	305	Mission Santa Inés	1760 Mission Dr. 34°35′40″N 120°08′12″W	Solvang	
Presidio of Santa Barbara	636	Presidio of Santa Barbara	El Presidio de Santa Barbara State Historic Park; 34°25′21″N 119°41′50″W	Santa Barbara	Also on the NRHP list as NPS-73000455
Santa Barbara County Courthouse	1037	Santa Barbara County Courthouse	1100 Anacapa St. 34°25′28″N 119°42′09″W	Santa Barbara	Also on the NRHP list as NPS-81000177
Site of original mission and remaining ruins of La Purisima Mission	928	Site of original mission and remaining ruins of La Purisima Mission	541 South F Street; 34°37′53″N 120°27′19″W	Lompoc	Ruin remains of first La Purisima Mission
Well, Hill 4	582	Well, Hill 4	Unocal Corporation, Mission Hills District; 34°42′58″N 120°24′33″W	Lompoc	Plaque is behind gated facility.

== See also ==
- List of California Historical Landmarks
- National Register of Historic Places listings in Santa Barbara County, California
- City of Santa Barbara Historic Landmarks
