= Hastings Adobe (Santa Barbara, California) =

California Historical Landmark

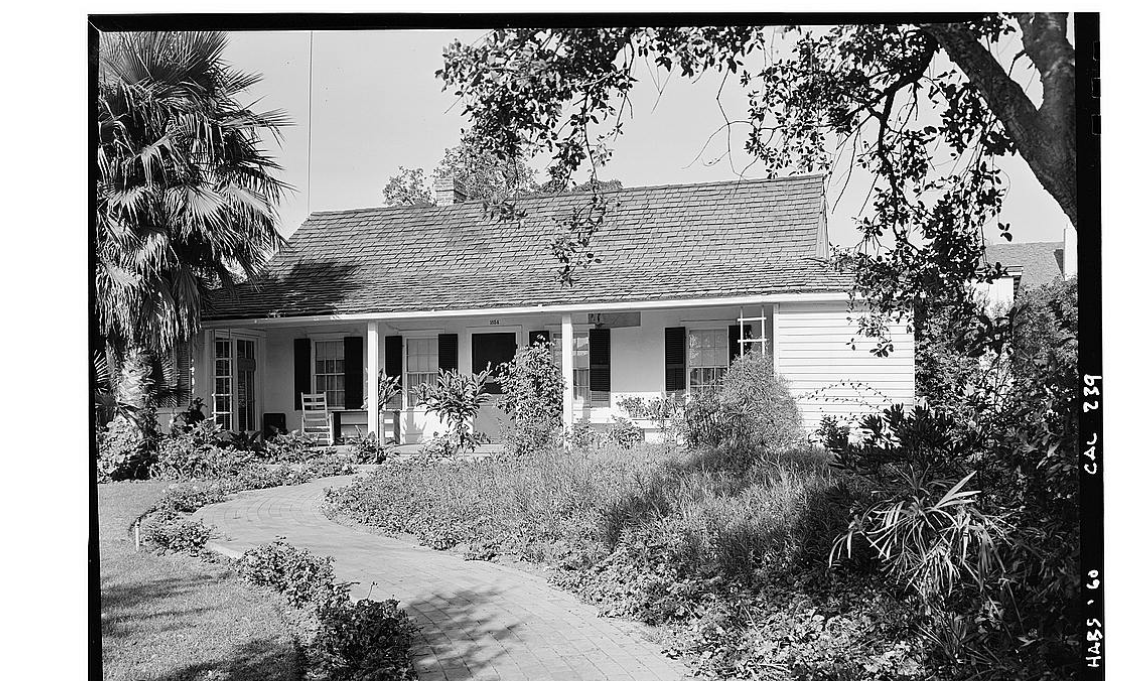
- Hastings adobe - Trussell-Winchester adobe
- Interactive map of Hastings Adobe
- 34°24′37″N 119°41′52″W
- Location: 414 West Montecito Street, Santa Barbara, Santa Barbara County, California

California Historical Landmark
- Official name: Hastings adobe
- Designated: December 31, 1956
- Reference no.: 559

The Hastings adobe also called the Trussell-Winchester adobe is a California Historical Landmark in Santa Barbara, California. The house is one of the oldest in Santa Barbara, built in 1854. The adobe became a California State Historical Landmark No. 559 on December 31, 1956.

== History ==
The house was built by Horatio Gates Trussell (1814-1880), who came to California from Maine. Trussell has sailed the seas from his youth and rose to be the captain of his own ship. On his trip to Santa Barbara, he fell in love with the city and Ramona Eayrs-Burke. He married Ramona on September 1, 1851. Isaac Sparks (1804–1867), Ramona's stepfather a merchant and rancher in the city, deeded the land for their new home. Trussell built the adobe brick and wood house near the present-day corner of West Montecito and Castillo streets. Rather than use the local custom of a Spanish tile roof, the home had New England-style wooden shingles. Trussell was able to get some of the timber needed from the shipwrecked SS Winfield Scott that sank off Anacapa Island in 1853. The Trussell family had 10 children and later built a two-story house a few blocks away. A local banker, William M. Eddy, from New York in 1849, purchased the house in 1878 and sold it to Uriah Winchester (1814- 1897) in 1882. Winchester also had come to California from Maine in 1869. Winchester made changes to the house, adding a room and enlarging others. Winchester family had six children. Two: Robert (1845-1932) became a doctor; Charlotte (1850-1942) married Stanley Bagg (1856-1931), who owned The Tombstone Epitaph newspaper in Arizona from 1891 till 1895. Winchester family started to sell off parts of the lot in the 1920s. Charlotte's daughter, Katherine Bagg (1877-1955), married John Hastings. When Katherine died in 1955, with no children, the house was given to the Santa Barbara Historical Society per her will.

== See also ==
- History of Santa Barbara, California
- California Historical Landmarks in Santa Barbara County, California
