= Thomas Hope House =

Historic house in California, United States

- U.S. National Register of Historic Places
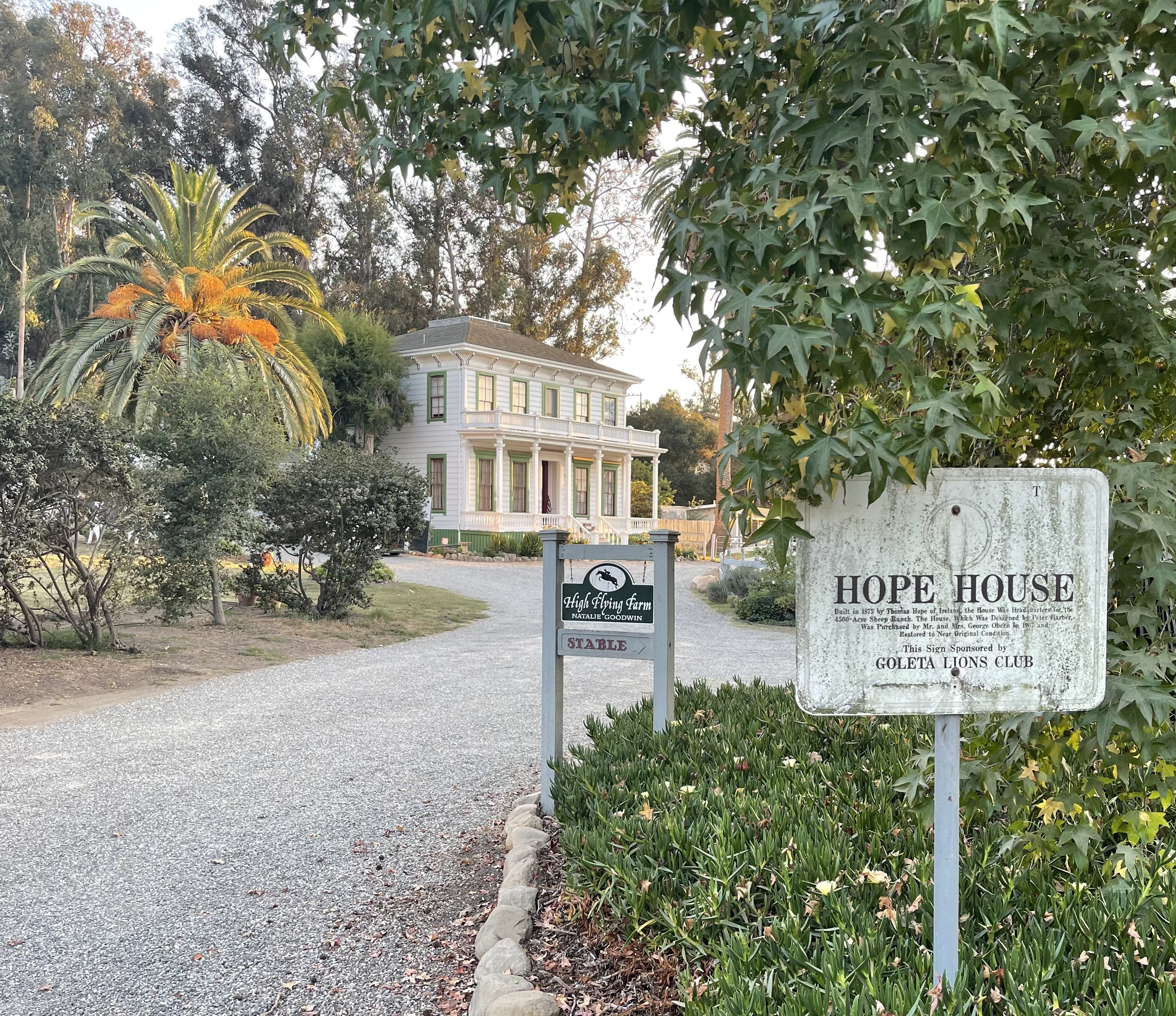

- Location within California Location within the United States
- Location: 399 Nogal Drive, Santa Barbara, California
- Coordinates: 34°26′06″N 119°46′15″W
- Built: 1875
- Architect: Peter Barber
- NRHP reference No.: 78000783
- Added to NRHP: December 1, 1978

Thomas Hope House is a historic ranch home located in Santa Barbara, California. Constructed in 1875, the home had several owners before being renovated in 1968. The home was designated as a Santa Barbara County historic landmark in 1969 and added to the National Register of Historic Places in 1978.

== History ==
Around 1850, Thomas Hope moved to Santa Barbara with his wife to raise sheep and cattle. Hope's business was successful and he quickly became one of the wealthiest men in the Santa Barbara area. In 1875, Hope elected to build a ranch home and dedicated $10,000 to the project. Hope enlisted famed local architect Peter Barber to design the home. Barber had previously designed a number of Victorian style buildings in the area.

Hope died from stomach cancer in 1876, shortly after the home was completed. His wife and children continued to live in the home until 1888, at which point it was sold to the Pacific Improvement Company, which was an arm of the Southern Pacific Railroad. In 1919, the Railroad sold the home to Maurice Heckser. Heckser, in turn, sold the home to Harold S. Chase in 1924–25, a developer who was responsible for the creation of the Hope Ranch community. The home was then used as the headquarters for the Hope Ranch Park.

In 1967, the home was sold to E. George and Vivian Obern. The Oberns found the home in a state of disrepair, with the local government threatening to demolish it if repairs were not made. The Oberns elected to renovate the home rather than demolish it. The renovation began in the Spring of 1968 and resulted in the home receiving a new kitchen, bathrooms, wiring, plumbing, gas lines, and a furnace. The Oberns tried to replace the original fixtures and furnishings with materials salvaged from old homes and found in antique shops to the fullest possible extent.

On December 5, 1968, the Oberns asked Santa Barbara County to designate the house as a historic landmark. The Oberns' request was granted on August 4, 1969. The home was added to the National Register of Historic Places on December 1, 1978.

== Architectural style ==
The home is considered to be a Victorian redwood house, with a center staircase leading visitors up to four rooms on each side of the house, for a total of nine rooms in the house. The house originally included a functioning coal burning fireplace.

== See also ==
- National Register of Historic Places listings in Santa Barbara County, California
