= Santa Barbara Cottage Hospital =

- Cottage Health
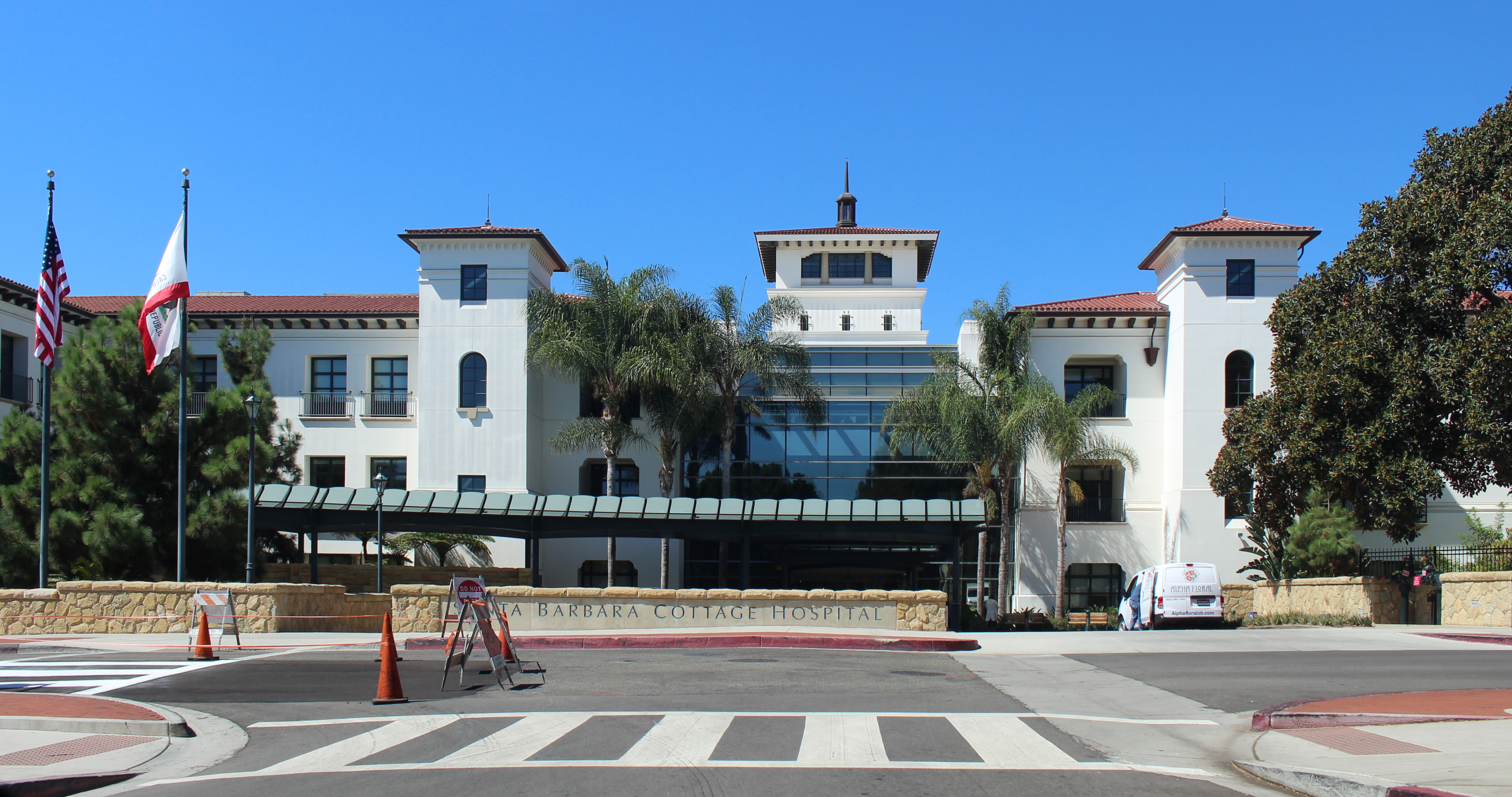
- Hospital entrance, c. 2022

Geography
- Location: Santa Barbara, California, United States
- Coordinates: 34°25′50″N 119°43′23″W

Organization
- Type: Community

Services
- Emergency department: Level I Adult Trauma Center/ Level II Pediatric Trauma Center
- Beds: 519

Helipads
- Helipad: (FAA LID: 3CN2)
Number	Length		Surface
Number	ft	m	Surface
H1	48x48	15x15	concrete

History
- Founded: December 8, 1891

Links
- Website: Official website
- Lists: Hospitals in California

Santa Barbara Cottage Hospital is a teaching and tertiary care hospital in the city of Santa Barbara, California. It is owned and operated by the Cottage Health System.

== Services ==
Santa Barbara Cottage Hospital is a full-service hospital, primarily serving the diverse population of Santa Barbara County. There are three other satellite hospitals within the Cottage Health system: Santa Ynez Cottage Hospital, Goleta Valley Cottage Hospital, and Cottage Rehabilitation Hospital. The hospital has regular medical-surgical beds as well as a CCU and an ICU.

Several medical services are offered, including a Level III NICU and the hospital was recognized for its geriatric care.

Santa Barbara Cottage Hospital is a Level I Trauma Center (upgraded from Level II in 2017) and the largest between Los Angeles and San Francisco.

== History ==
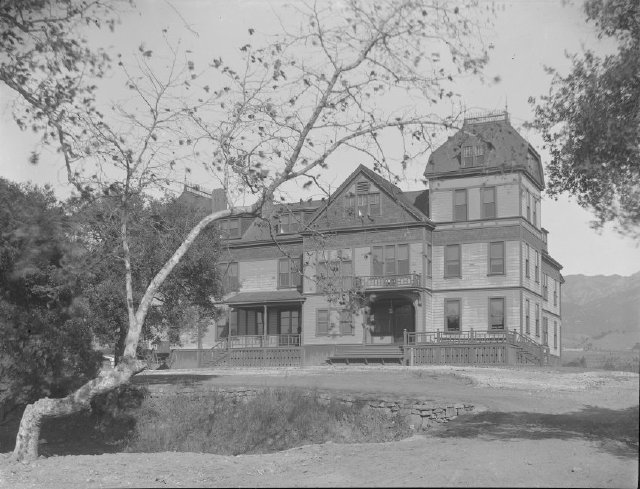
The original Cottage Hospital building, designed by Peter J. Barber

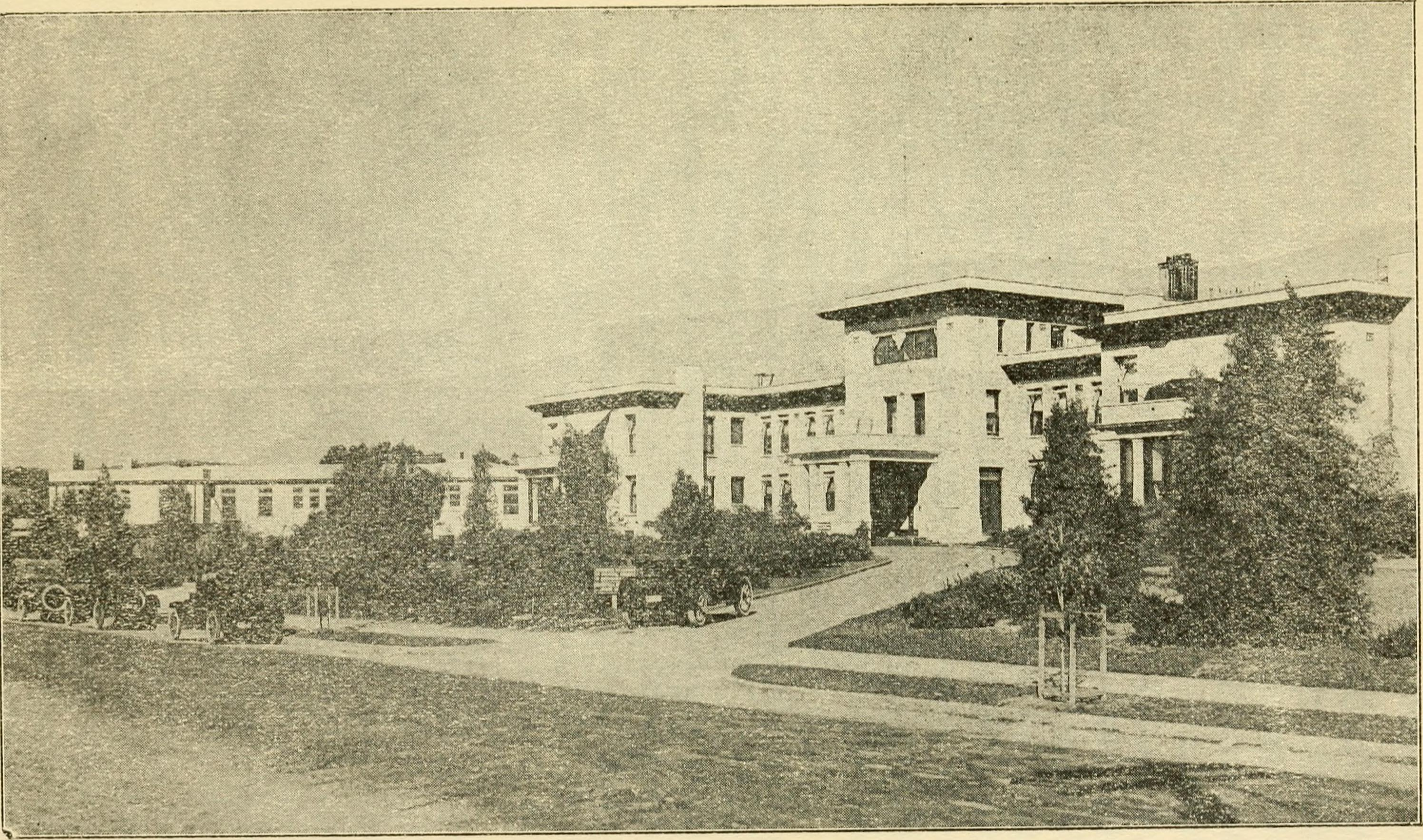
The hospital entrance, c. 1920

Santa Barbara Cottage Hospital was opened on December 8, 1891 as a twenty-five bed hospital by Mary A. Ashley. The original building was designed by the prominent local architect Peter J. Barber.

On June 4, 2021, Princess Lilibet of Sussex, daughter of Prince Harry, Duke of Sussex and Meghan, Duchess of Sussex, and granddaughter of King Charles III, was born at the hospital.

Douglas Adams, the British author, died in this hospital in 2001 after suffering a heart attack.
