= Chapel of San Ramon =

Historic site in Santa Maria, California

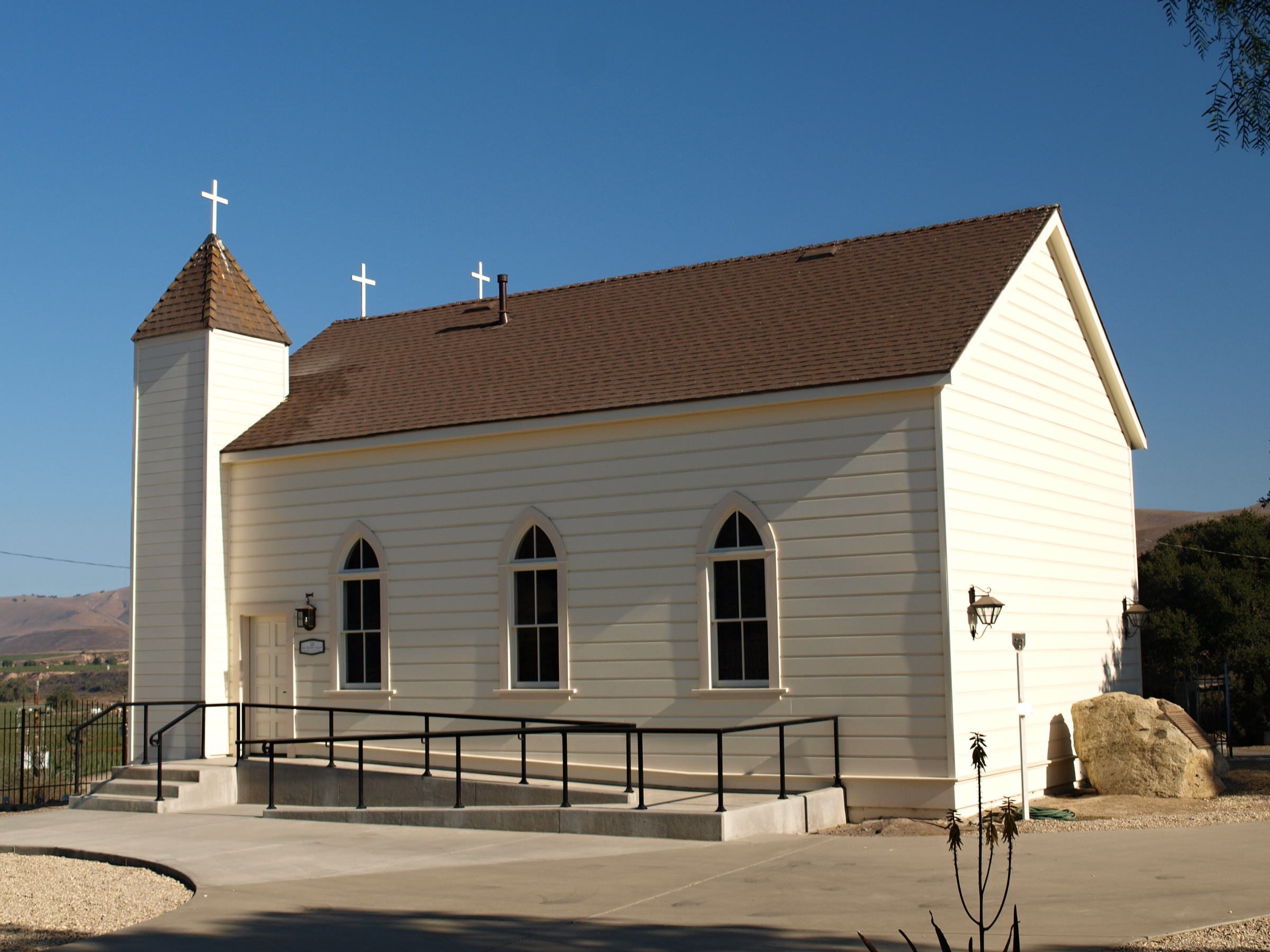
- Interactive map of Chapel of San Ramon
- Location: 6601 Foxen Canyon Rd, Santa Maria, CA
- Coordinates: 34°50′52″N 120°14′28″W
- Built: 1875; 150 years ago
- Website: www.sanramonchapel.info

California Historical Landmark
- Official name: Chapel of San Ramon
- Designated: January 13, 1975
- Reference no.: 877

The Chapel of San Ramon, also known as the Benjamin Foxen Memorial Chapel or the Sisquoc Chapel, is a chapel and cemetery located in Santa Maria, California, United States. It is listed on the list of California Historical Landmarks and is also the first historic landmark listed by Santa Barbara County, California.

The church is considered a quality example of "the transition between the architecture of the old missions and the frame churches of the American settlers." It was also one of the first Catholic churches in the Santa Maria Valley, having been built in 1875.

== History ==
Frederick and Ramona Foxen Wickenden purchased the property where the chapel sits from the federal government in 1872. The couple donated land for the chapel and a cemetery. Frederick Wickenden sold 5,000 sheep to buy redwood for the chapel's construction; Wickenden, his brother-in-law Thomas Foxen, and Chris Clausen built it in 1875. The church was designed by Father J.B. McNally, a priest at the Diocesan Seminary of Our Lady of Guadalupe at Santa Ynez. In 1876, the first burial was made in the cemetery, that of Benjamin Foxen, father of Ramona Wickenden and Thomas Foxen. In 1879, the chapel was dedicated by Francisco Mora y Borrell in behalf of Saint Ramon. The chapel was located within the confines of Rancho Tepusquet, a Mexican Land Grant tract patented Tomás Olivera (1787–1848). Olivera's step daughter, María Martina Osuna Ontiveros (1809–1898) and her husband Juan Pacifico Ontiveros (1795-1877) acquired the land after probate proceedings following the death of Olivera. These earliest parishioners of the chapel are buried on the chapel grounds. Through the 19th Century into the early 20th Century the Chapel of San Ramon served as the parish church for families in the villages of Garey, Tepusquet and Sisquoc.

In 1908, the chapel joined the Parish of Saint Mary in Santa Maria as an auxiliary chapel. Regular services were canceled that year, and the church was used only for funerals and other special occasions. In 1936, the chapel received a new roof and paint and Robert E. Easton rededicated the building.

In 1950, the Native Daughters of the Golden West declared the chapel as their own historic landmark and called it "Benjamin Foxen Memorial Chapel." In 1958–59, the chapel was renovated by Winston Wickenden. He replaced the original foundation, made of wood, with concrete. In 1966, it became the first historic landmark listed by the county of Santa Barbara.

=== Contemporary times ===
The chapel began to suffer from frequent vandalism and also had structural problems. In 1972, the San Ramon Preservation group was formed to help protect the property from additional vandalism. In January, 1975, the chapel was named to the California Historical Landmarks list. The chapel is considered to be architecturally significant in that it retains some the exterior forms of the Spanish and Mexican missions of the 18th and early 19th centuries, but was constructed of California redwood in clapboard planking style that is more typically found in church construction in New England. A dedication ceremony was held in August and mass was held by Father Bertin Foxen, great-grandson of Benjamin Foxen. In December of that year, a gate was installed at the entrance to the grounds and was dedicated as the John W. Woolsey Memorial Gate. The San Ramon Chapel Preservation Committee (SRCPC), the organizing body that maintains the property and building, became a non-profit in 1976. Mass began again weekly in November. In 1978, the chapel received a new roof and glass windows.

A new foundation was installed in 1983 and additional renovations took place, totaling $12,154. In 1985, the first electric heater was installed in the chapel. Stations of the Cross were installed on site by Drew Crosby in 1986. The next year, SRCPC offered to turn the property over to the Roman Catholic Archdiocese of Los Angeles. They declined the offer and SRCPC continued to maintain the property. The first water well was installed in 1988. As of 1999, renovations to the chapel continued.

== See also ==
- History of Santa Barbara, California
- California Historical Landmarks in Santa Barbara County, California
