= Carpinteria Valley Museum of History =

- Museum entrance
- Location: 956 Maple Avenue, Carpinteria, California
- Coordinates: 34.397495°N 119.517497°W
- Type: History museum
- Website: http://www.carpinteriahistoricalmuseum.org

Carpinteria Valley Museum of History
- Carpinteria and Indian Village of Mishopshnow
- Interactive map of Carpinteria Valley Museum of History

California Historical Landmark
- Designated: May 31, 1955
- Reference no.: 535

The Carpinteria Valley Museum of History (CVMH) is a museum located in Carpinteria, California. It is operated by the non-profit Carpinteria Valley Historical Society primarily through membership dues, memorial donations, endowment income, and fund-raising activities. The museum is staffed by volunteer docents.

== Exhibits and activities ==
The museum includes exhibits that reflect the histories of the three cultures that have dwelled in the region: the Chumash people; Spanish and Mexican settlers; and the pioneers. The museum hosts historical photographs that reflect the development of the region as well as artifacts left behind by former inhabitants. The museum's community outreach projects include school tours and children's programs as well as lectures offered to the general population, arts and crafts fairs and monthly flea markets. Its gift shop offers memorabilia and books.

The museum also houses the non-circulating C. Horace Coshow research library which includes books, maps, newspaper archives, historical photographs and 246 taped interviews about the area with older residents.

== Carpinteria and Indian Village of Mishopshnow ==
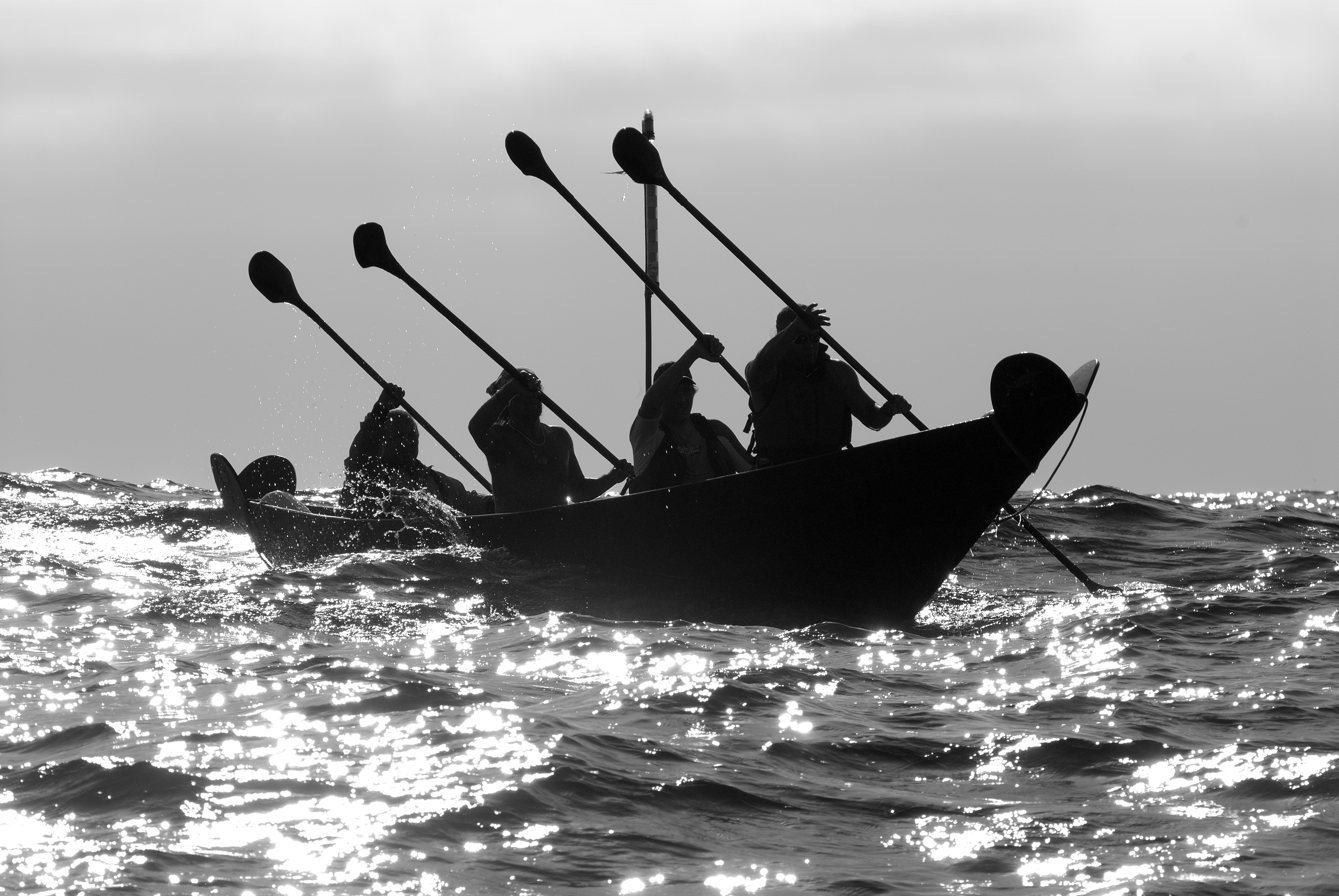
Chumash wooden canoes, Tomol 'Elye'wun paddlers

The Carpinteria and Indian Village of Mishopshnow at the Carpinteria Valley Museum of History is a California Historical Landmark No. 535 designated on May 31, 1955. Juan Rodríguez Cabrillo discovered the Chumash Indian village of Mishopshnow on August 14, 1542. Fray Juan Crespí of the Portolà expedition named the village San Roque on August 17, 1769.

The California Historical Landmark reads:

NO. 535 CARPINTERIA AND INDIAN VILLAGE OF MISHOPSHNOW - The Chumash Indian village of Mishopshnow, discovered by Juan Rodríguez Cabrillo on August 14, 1542, was located one-fourth mile southwest of the monument. Fray Juan Crespí of the Gaspar de Portolá Expedition named it San Roque on August 17, 1769. Portolá's soldiers, observing the Indians building wooden canoes, called the village La Carpinteria-the Carpenter's Shop.

== See also ==
- List of museums in the California Central Coast
- Carpinteria Valley, California
- History of Santa Barbara, California
- California Historical Landmarks in Santa Barbara County, California
