= Arlington Hotel (Santa Barbara, California) =

Historic hotel in Santa Barbara, California

Coordinates: 34.4179°N 119.697°W

Arlington Hotel (no. 1)
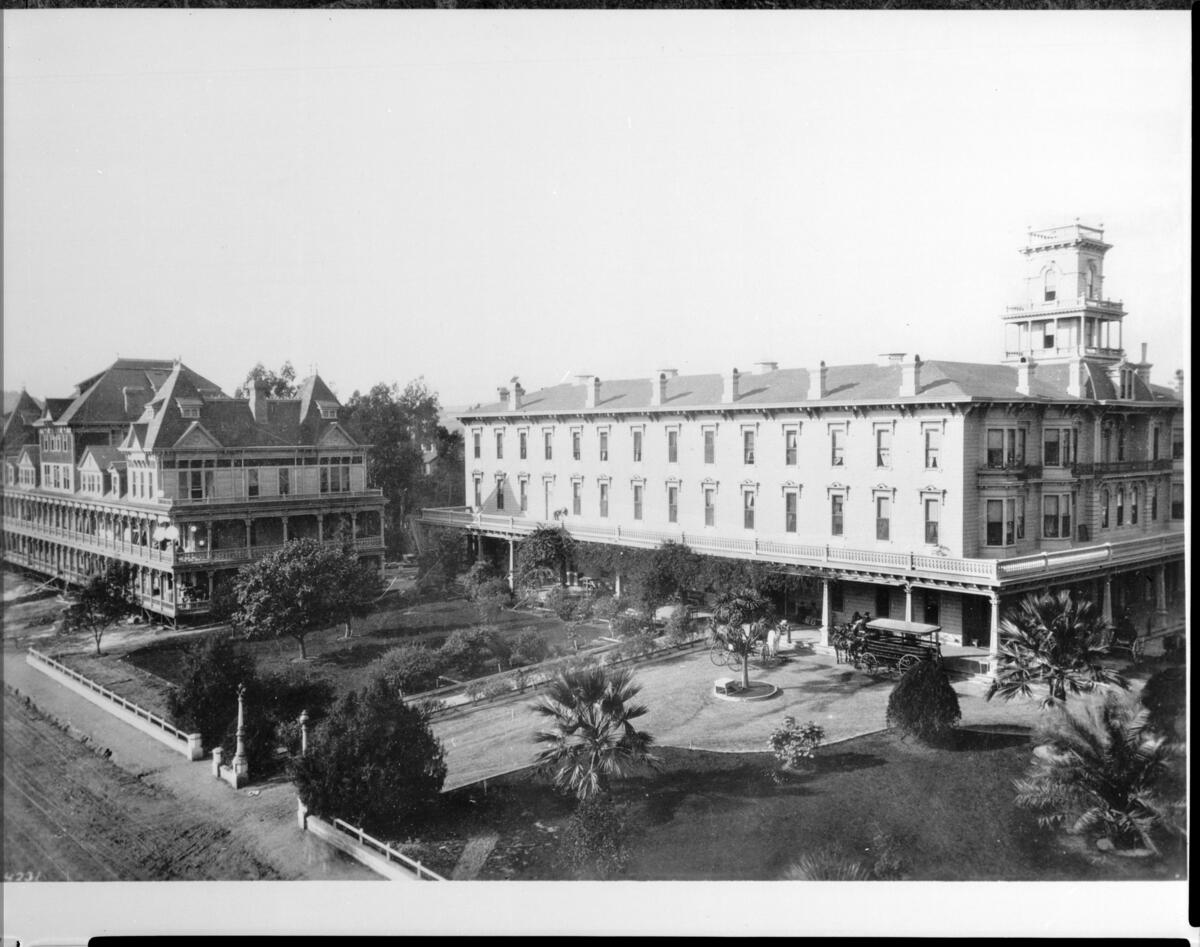

General information
- Architectural style: Italianate
- Location: Santa Barbara, California
- Opened: 1876
- Destroyed: 1909 (by fire)

Design and construction
- Architect: Peter J. Barber

Arlington Hotel (no. 2)
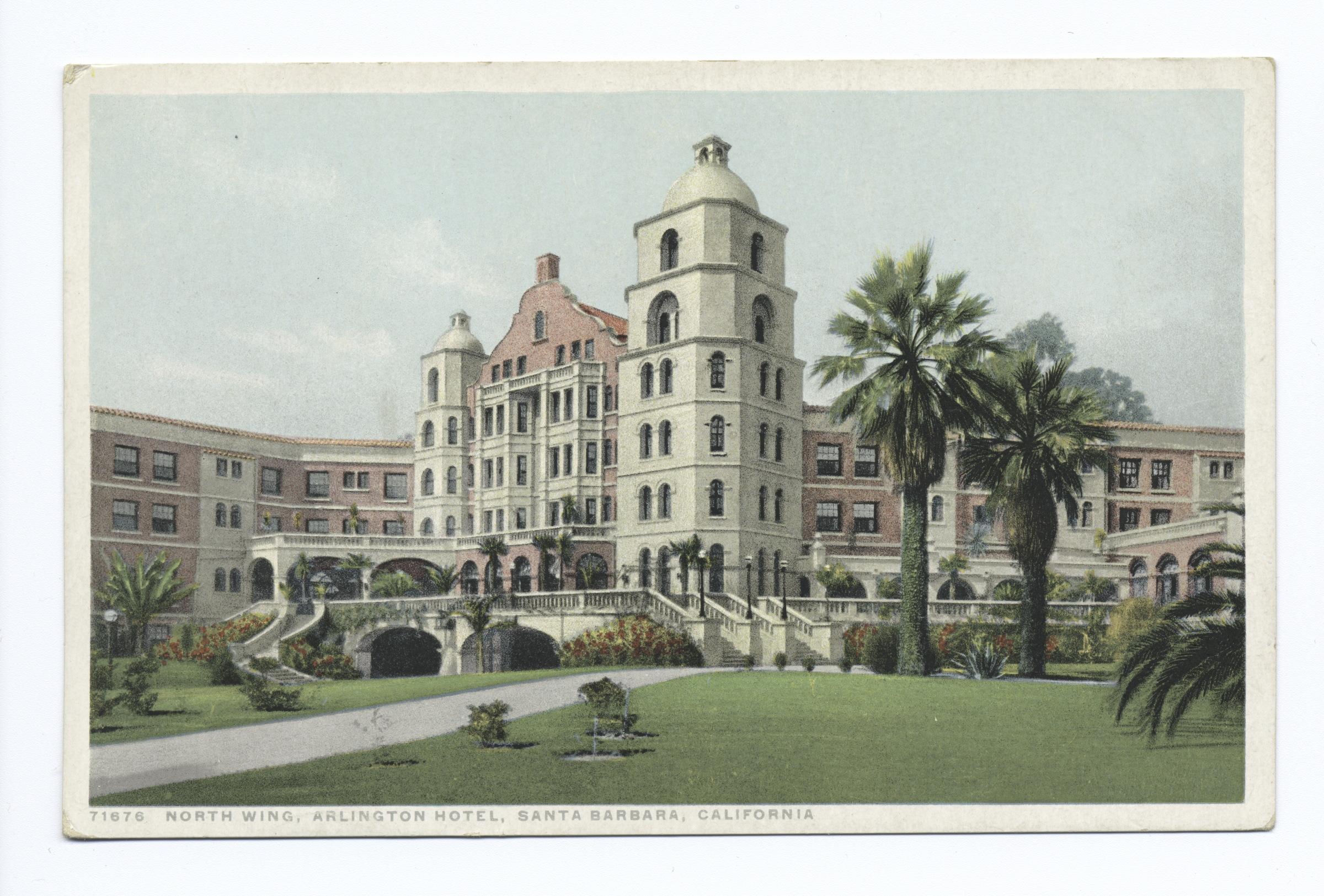

General information
- Architectural style: Spanish Colonial Revival
- Opened: 1911
- Destroyed: 1925 (by the earthquake)

Design and construction
- Architect: Arthur Burnett Benton

The Arlington Hotel was a historic hotel in Santa Barbara, California, United States. Opened in 1876, it was one of the grandest hotels in the West. The original building burned down on 15 August 1909, and a replacement hotel was completed in 1911 at a cost of over one and a half million dollars. This building suffered further misfortune when a strong earthquake devastated the town in 1925, and the hotel was left in ruins.

== History ==
The Arlington Hotel was built in 1875 as the first luxury hotel in Santa Barbara. It occupied a 5-acre (2.0 ha) plot on State Street, located between Sola Street and Victoria Street. It was a three-storey building set back from the road with a long veranda and many windows on the upper two floors. The hotel was situated in landscaped gardens and had a six-story observation tower at one end. With gas lighting, fireplaces, speaking tubes for communication, and "pure mountain stream water," it had about 90 guest rooms. On the lower floor there was a reading room, a smoking room, a saloon, two billiard rooms, a reception room and a private dining room. The hotel overran its budget, costing $170,000 to build, including the furnishings and landscaping. It was opened on 27 February 1876 and is thought to have been named after Arlington House, the family home of Confederate Army General Robert E. Lee. After the arrival of the railroad in Santa Barbara in 1887, an annex was added to provide accommodation for additional guests. Among the famous guests who stayed at the hotel were Presidents Harrison, McKinley and Roosevelt, many other American and foreign dignitaries, and Princess Louise, the fourth daughter of Queen Victoria.

A fire broke out in the evening of 15 August 1909, and the hotel was gutted; by morning, only the chimneys remained standing. There were no casualties, probably because most of the guests were out at dinner when the fire started. A Los Angeles architect, Arthur Burnett Benton, was commissioned to build a replacement hotel in the old Spanish Mission Revival style. The new structure had 250 rooms arranged in five storeys and a number of decorative bell-towers. Fire safety was an objective in its construction and it incorporated red roof tiles, steel beams, and much brick and concrete. It cost one and a half million dollars to build and was opened in 1911.

Santa Barbara experienced a magnitude 6.3 earthquake at 6:44 am on 29 June 1925 and the Arlington Hotel was among many hotels and commercial buildings that were seriously damaged. A hotel guest told a reporter on the Santa Barbara News Press, "It all happened in a minute. The crash of falling timber and steel beams, and the walls of the hotel, made an indescribable inferno of sound". On this occasion, two people were killed when a large water tank in one of the bell towers came crashing down; ironically, it had been placed there to provide a ready source of water in case of fire. The devastation to Santa Barbara was such that the downtown area had to be razed, and the city planners were able to enforce strict building standards when it was rebuilt. The Arlington Hotel was not rebuilt, and the Arlington Theatre now stands on the site it previously occupied.
