= Joseph and Lucy Foster Sexton House =

Historic house in California, United States

- U.S. National Register of Historic Places
- U.S. Historic district
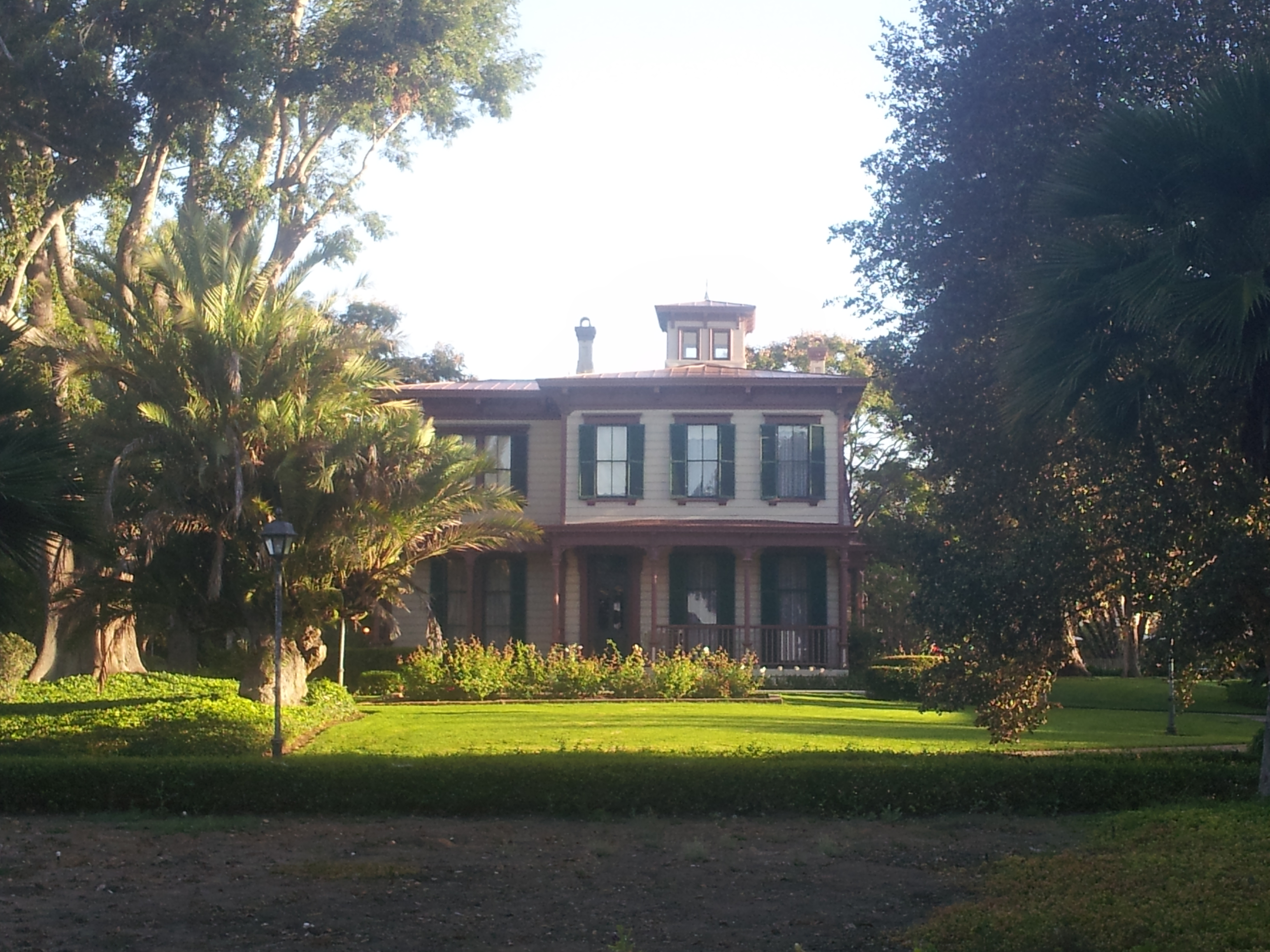

- Location within California Location within the United States
- Location: 5490 Hollister Ave., Goleta, CA 93111
- Coordinates: 34°26′9″N 119°48′55″W
- Area: 1.5 acres (0.61 ha)
- Built: 1880
- Architect: Peter J. Barber
- Architectural style: Italianate
- NRHP reference No.: 91002033
- Added to NRHP: February 5, 1992

The Sexton House in Goleta, California is a two-story Italianate style house that was built in 1880. It was designed by architect Peter J. Barber.

It was listed on the U.S. National Register of Historic Places (NRHP) in 1992 as 'Joseph and Lucy Foster Sexton House. The listing includes, in addition to the main house, four contributing structures, two objects, and one site on a 1.5-acre (0.61 ha) property. Photos included with its NRHP nomination show a pentagonal pool, a built-in china cabinet, a faux marble fireplace.

It was designated as one of seven Historic Landmarks by the City of Goleta when it adopted its Historic Preservation and Archaeological & Tribal Cultural Resources Ordinance in 2022.

The original owner, Joseph Sexton, was a horticulturist who planted trees and shrubs on the property that, in 1991, partially screened the house from busy Hollister Avenue.

The house was damaged in the 1925 Santa Barbara earthquake; in 1926 three porches were removed.

The house was restored during 1990–91 as part of the development of a Quality Suites Inn, which is a 75-unit motor hotel.

The home still remains on the original property. The house currently shares the site with the Steward Hotel. The second floor of the home is now a one bedroom apartment that is leased out to long term corporate guests. The first floor is available for business and social functions.
