= Faith Mission (Santa Barbara, California) =

Historic church in California, United States

- U.S. National Register of Historic Places
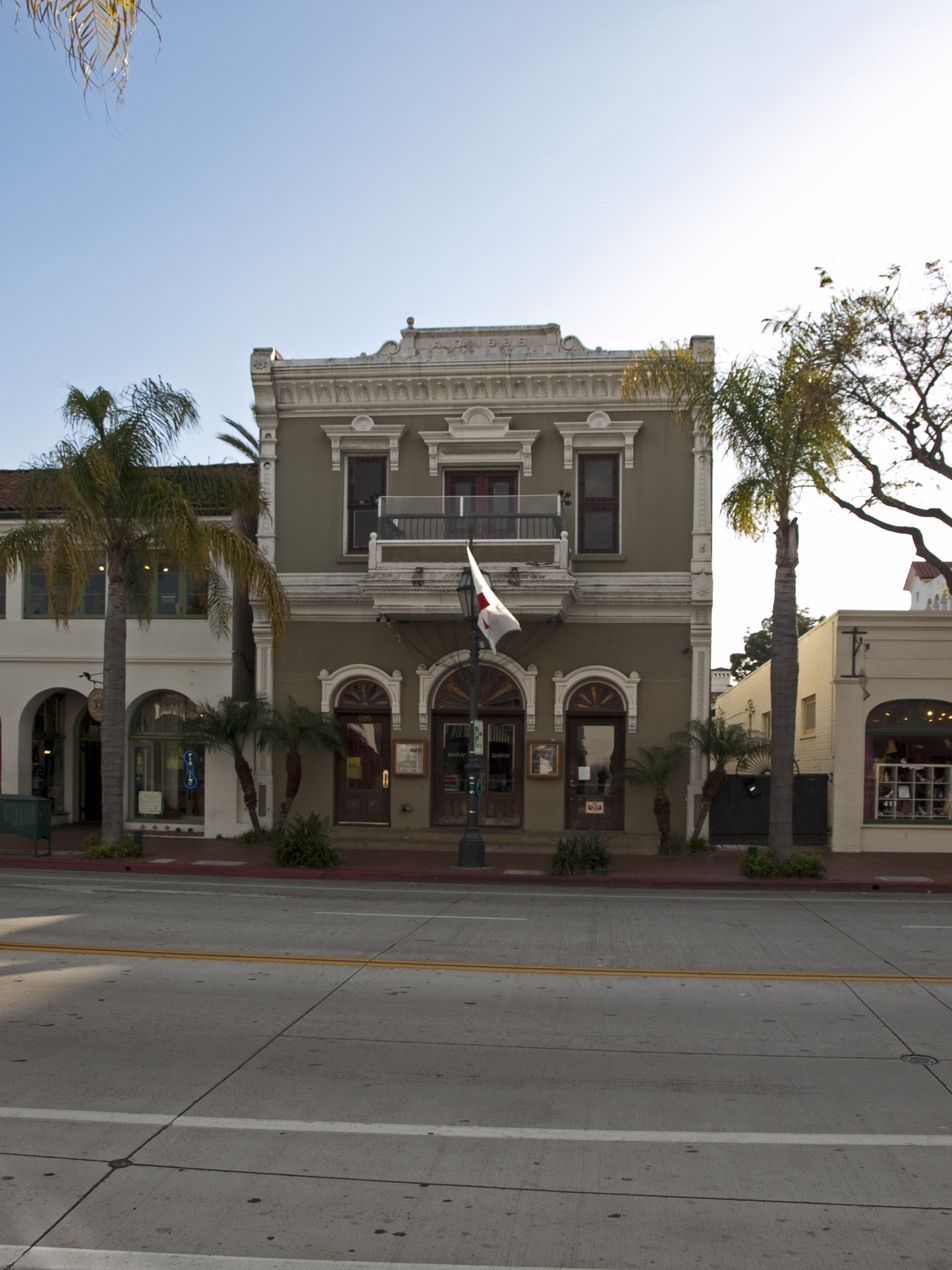
- The facade of the building from State Street

- Location within California Location within the United States
- Location: 409 State St., Santa Barbara, California
- Coordinates: 34°24′57.6″N 119°41′41″W
- Area: 0.1 acres (0.040 ha)
- Built: 1889
- Architect: Barber, Peter J.
- Architectural style: Stick/Eastlake, Italianate
- NRHP reference No.: 82002269
- Added to NRHP: January 11, 1982

The Hotel Savoy, at 409 State St. in Santa Barbara, California, was built in 1889 as Faith Mission. It was designed by architect Peter J. Barber in Stick/Eastlake and Italianate architectural styles. It was listed on the National Register of Historic Places in 1982.

It has served as a religious structure and as a hotel, and was listed for its architecture.

It was deemed notable because of its "elaborate stamped metal facade decorations", unique in southern Santa Barbara County, and as it is possibly the last 19th-century commercial building in Santa Barbara surviving with its original facade intact.

== History ==
Faith Mission was a religious organization headquartered in Boston; its purpose was to provide religious instruction and housing for "erring young men." The Reverend E.J. Scudder established the Santa Barbara branch in June 1884 with his wife and Mr. and Mrs. S. Chafe. Rev. Scudder died the following year, but his wife continued the ministry. Services were held in a rented hall until the building at 409 State Street was built in 1889.

The first religious services were held in the building January 26, 1890. The following month a library on the upper story was opened to the public; contributions of select, inoffensive reading materials were accepted.

After the building was constructed Mrs. Scudder had difficulty paying the property's mortgage and received limited assistance from local benefactors. Later the property was put into a trust, with Mrs. Scudder continuing to operate the mission. She tried to alleviate the local "tramp situation" by providing food and lodging to transients in exchange for tickets that they received while performing odd jobs in the community. In 1896 Mrs. Scudder was paying city business license fees for a "lodging house."

Around 1900 the Faith Mission housed the Associated Charities Relief Association, which helped the unemployed find day work. The association investigated welfare cases while meals, lodging and sermons were provided at the mission. Mrs. Scudder reported, "Yet without salary or promise of support from any human, the faithful workers are found ministering in jail, hospital, county house, homes of the sick and sorrowing, or wherever they are called, esteeming it a joy to be as their Master, going about doing good."

Before World War the Christian and Missionary Alliance began conducting services in the building and continued until 1928. The well-known Hitchcock missionary family operated the facility for a time.

The name Hotel Savoy appeared in the 1929-30 city directory, renamed by Kenneth Ahlman, who had become owner and proprietor in 1929. During World War II the hotel was used by servicemen and had a poor reputation.

The building underwent no major alterations until 1980, when the hotel was closed; many of its rooms were then removed, a stage was constructed, and the building was converted to the Savoy Theater. The Savoy Theater hosted theatrical productions and live music performances during the Eighties.

In 1990 the theater was closed after its owner was charged with felony drug trafficking and his properties were seized. The building remained closed through the first half of the Nineties, although Dennis Miller recorded an HBO special there during that time. The building reopened in April 1995 under new ownership as the Savoy Dinner Theater but closed a few months later. The building remained closed for several more years before undergoing further renovations (including the removal of its stage) and reopening in the late Nineties as Q's Billiards.

The building was later home to the night club Blind Tiger, M8RX, and then Backstage, all of which have now closed.
