= Virginia Hotel (Santa Barbara, California) =

- Hotel Virginia
- U.S. National Register of Historic Places
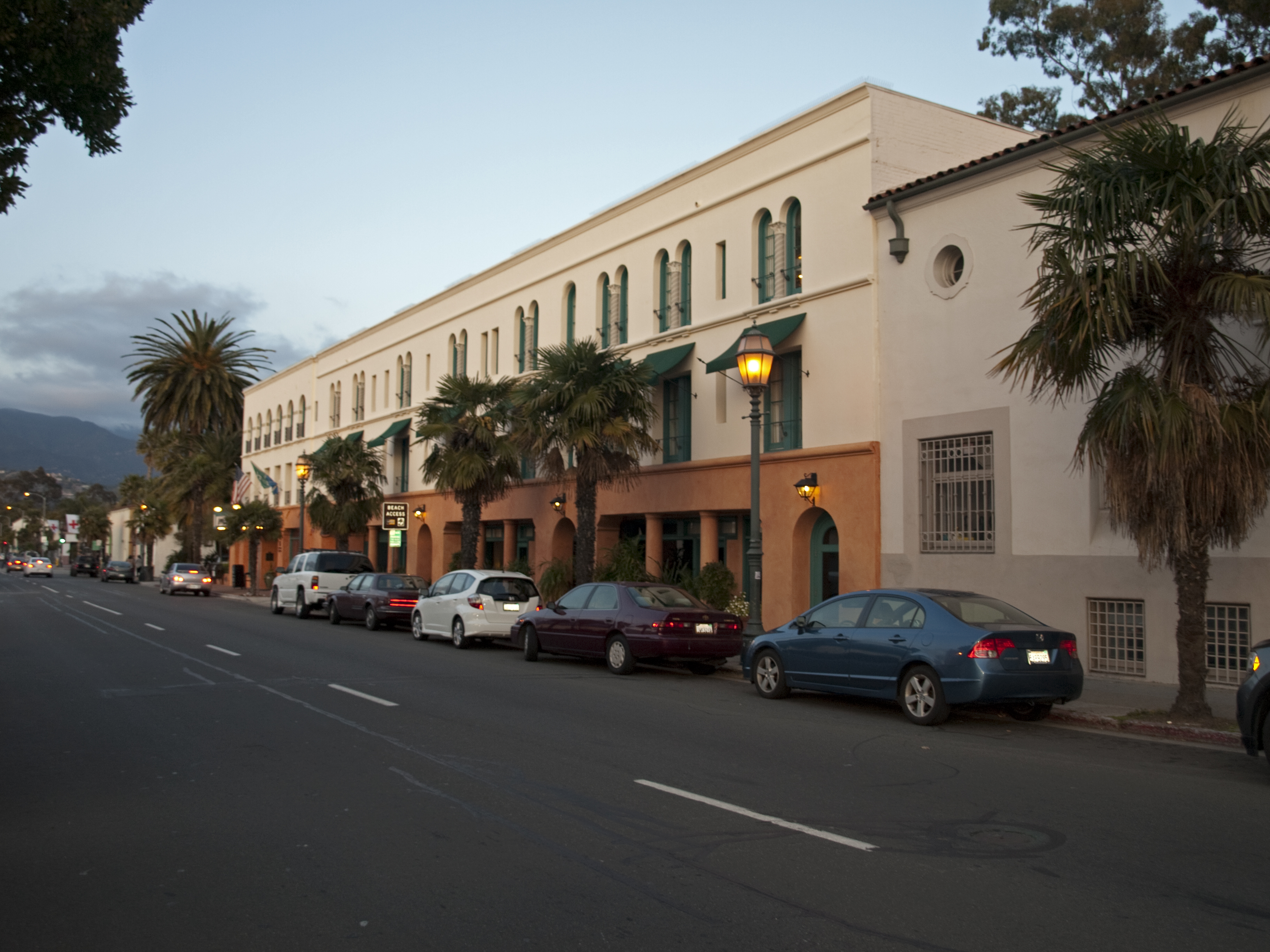
- Hotel Virginia

- Location within California Location within the United States
- Location: 17 West Haley St., Santa Barbara, California
- Coordinates: 34°24′58″N 119°41′46″W
- Built: 1925
- NRHP reference No.: 00000295
- Added to NRHP: March 31, 2000

The Hotel Virginia was built in 1925. It was listed on the National Register of Historic Places in 2000. It is also designated by the city of Santa Barbara as a local historical landmark. The building is located on the southern side of West Haley Street, 17 W. Haley Street, in the southeastern part of the historical center of Santa Barbara, California.

== History ==
At the place of the hotel prior to 1925 there were two hotel buildings, one constructed in 1916 (No. 17, belonging to Charles Maas, the first commercial property at Haley Street) and another one in 1922 (No. 23, belonging to Freas Hayman). The buildings were connected on the upper floors. They were badly damaged by the 1925 earthquake which destroyed the city center of Santa Barbara. Generally, the downtown of Santa Barbara was rebuilt in the Colonial Revival style, and the Virginia Hotel is considered to be one of the best representatives of the style in the city. The Virginia Hotel was one of the first buildings approved by the Architectural Advisory Committee, and actually one of the first ones to be constructed. This is one of the few survived buildings which had their facade completely re-designed in the Spanish Colonial Revival style right after the earthquake.

Maas and Hayman jointly hired the architect Clifford Denman from Los Angeles. Denman was tasked to repair the properties and also to transform the facade to the Colonial Revival style. He also added a third floor to the building. The two buildings behind the joint facade operated as two different hotels, and in 1931 the connections between them were closed. In 1977 the two hotels, which at the time were operated as a long-time dwelling, were joined as Hotel Virginia. In 1997, the hotel stopped operating and was vacated, and in 1998 it was sold. It was eventually rehabilitated and currently operates as the Hotel Virgini Santa Barbara, Tapestry Collection Boa Hilton.

== Architecture ==
The hotel is a three-floor building with a flat roof. The total area of the building is 29,000 square feet (2,700 m^{2}). It has an L-shape and consists of two buildings. These are connected by a segment which includes passages on the second and third floors as well as a section of the main facade. The most distinctive features of the building are found in the facade which is located parallel to West Haley Street.

The design used by Denman unified the two buildings composing the hotel by using a number of common features such as the same columns and wrought iron work. At the same time, it used other features underlying the difference between the buildings such as different windows design. Besides the Spanish Colonial Revival Style, it also included a number of elements characteristic for Mediterranean architecture, or specifically inspired by Venetian architecture. The clear elements of the Spanish Colonial Revival style include the first floor arcade and arched windows in the third floor.
