= East Beach (Santa Barbara) =

Beach in Santa Barbara, California

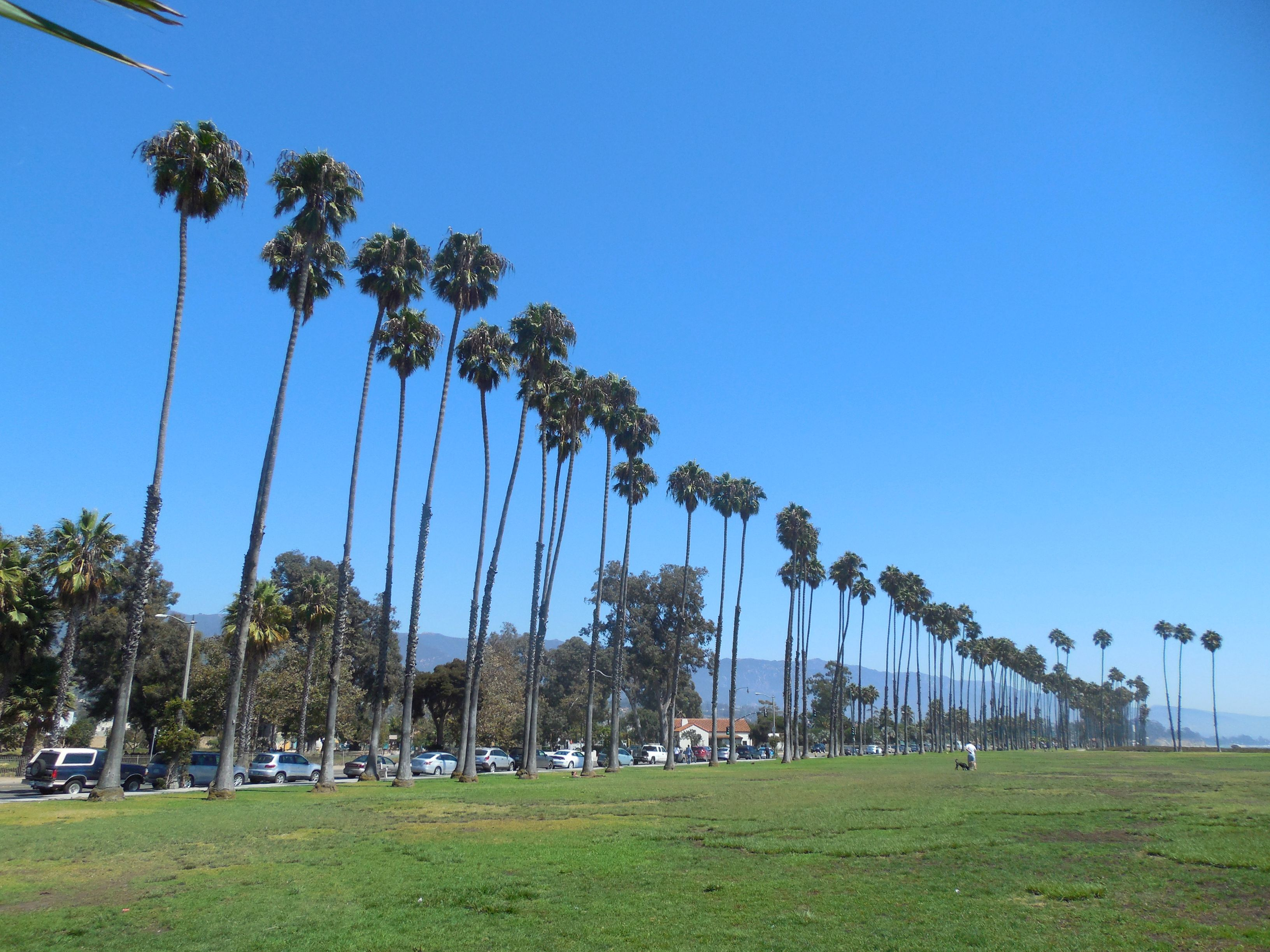
- Green space along East Beach in Santa Barbara
- Interactive map of East Beach
- Location: East Cabrillo Boulevard in Santa Barbara, California, extending east from Stearn's Wharf about 1.25-mile (2.01 km) to the Clark Estate, just east of Sycamore Creek
- Coordinates: 34.4142°N 119.682°W
- Created: City dedication in 1903; Continuous park (without commercial development) created shortly after 1928 purchase
- Operator: City of Santa Barbara Parks & Recreation Department
- Website: East Beach, Santa Barbara

East Beach located in Santa Barbara, California, United States, is often the first beach seen upon entering the city limits. East Beach is separated from West Beach by Stearn's Wharf, and is proximal to downtown Santa Barbara. East Beach is the primary beach for tourists, as some of the major Santa Barbara hotels face this beach. Cabrillo Bathhouse and Gym are also located on East Beach.

East Beach is world-famous for volleyball, as it hosts several volleyball tournaments each year.

East Beach has three lifeguard towers numbered five, four, and three (lifeguard towers two and one are on Leadbetter Beach), which are open during the summer months. The stretch of beach is not frequented as a surfing destination. East Beach is also home to the Santa Barbara Junior Lifeguards, who operate for seven weeks during the summer.
