= Hill–Carrillo Adobe =

Historic house in California, United States

- U.S. National Register of Historic Places
- California Historical Landmark
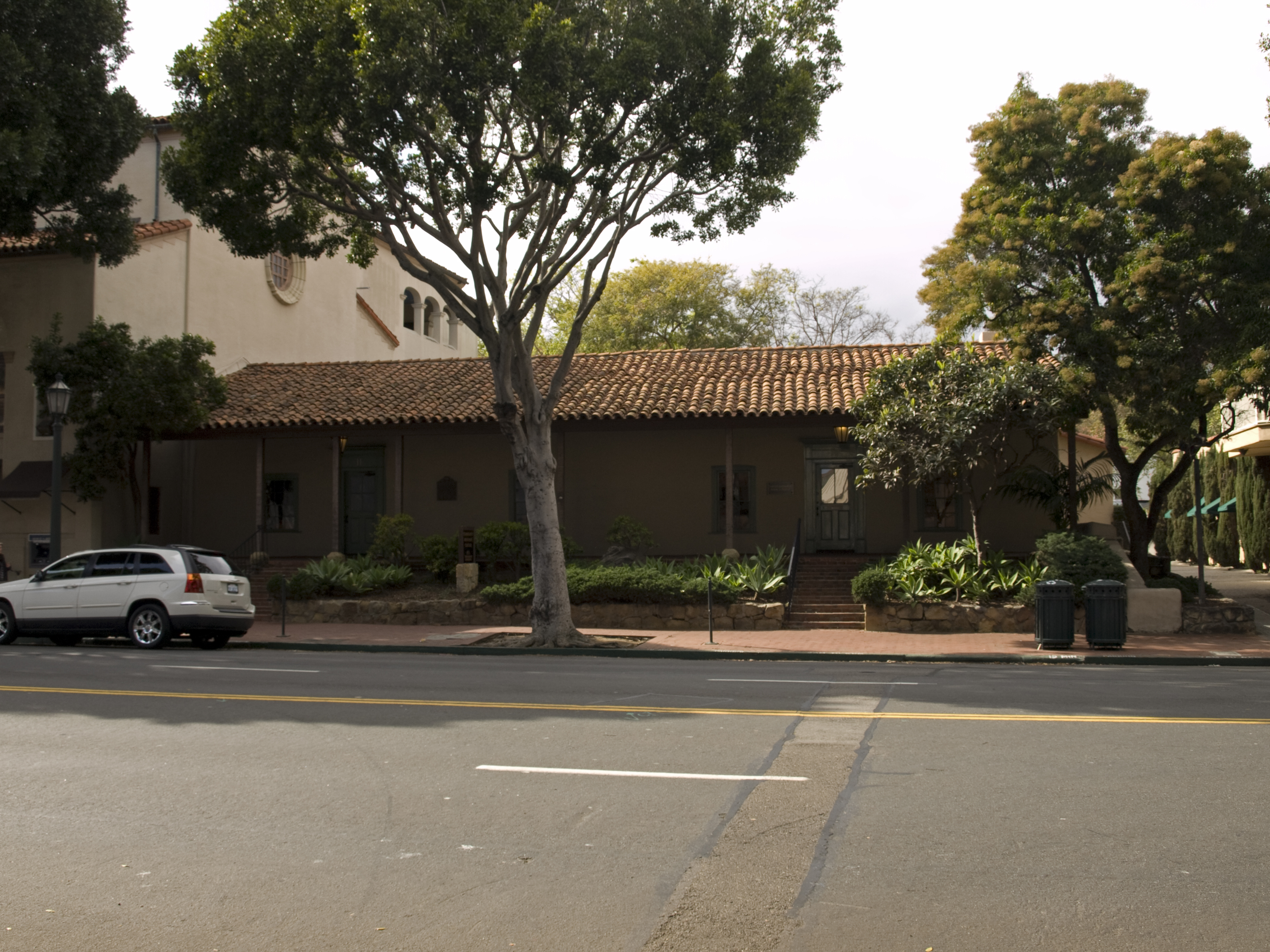
- View from Carrillo Street

- Location within California Location within the United States
- Location: 11 E. Carrillo St., Santa Barbara, California
- Coordinates: 34°25′19″N 119°42′06.25″W
- Area: 0.2 acres (0.081 ha)
- Built: 1825-26
- Built by: Hill, Daniel
- NRHP reference No.: 86000778
- CHISL No.: 721
- Added to NRHP: January 14, 1986

The Hill–Carrillo Adobe, also known as Carrillo Adobe, is a historic structure in Santa Barbara, California. Built in 1825 and 1826, it was listed on the National Register of Historic Places in 1986. It is also registered as a California Historical Landmark site (#721) as well.

It is a U-shaped building consisting of original rectangular 1825–1826 section that faces the street and two wings added in the 1900s. It was built by Daniel Hill, originally from Billerica, Massachusetts.
