= West Beach (Santa Barbara) =

Beach in Santa Barbara, California

Coordinates: 34.4106°N 119.69°W

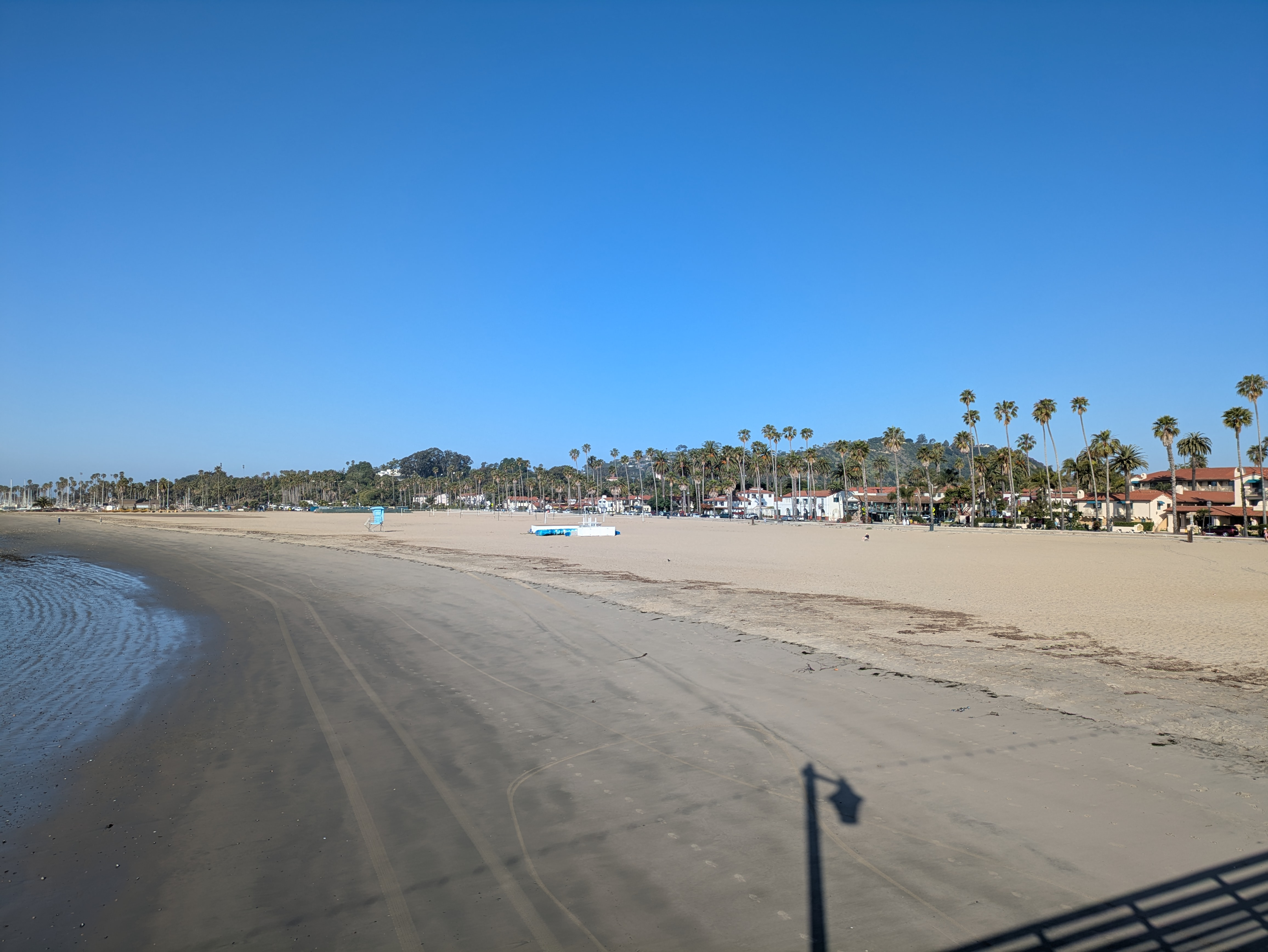
West Beach

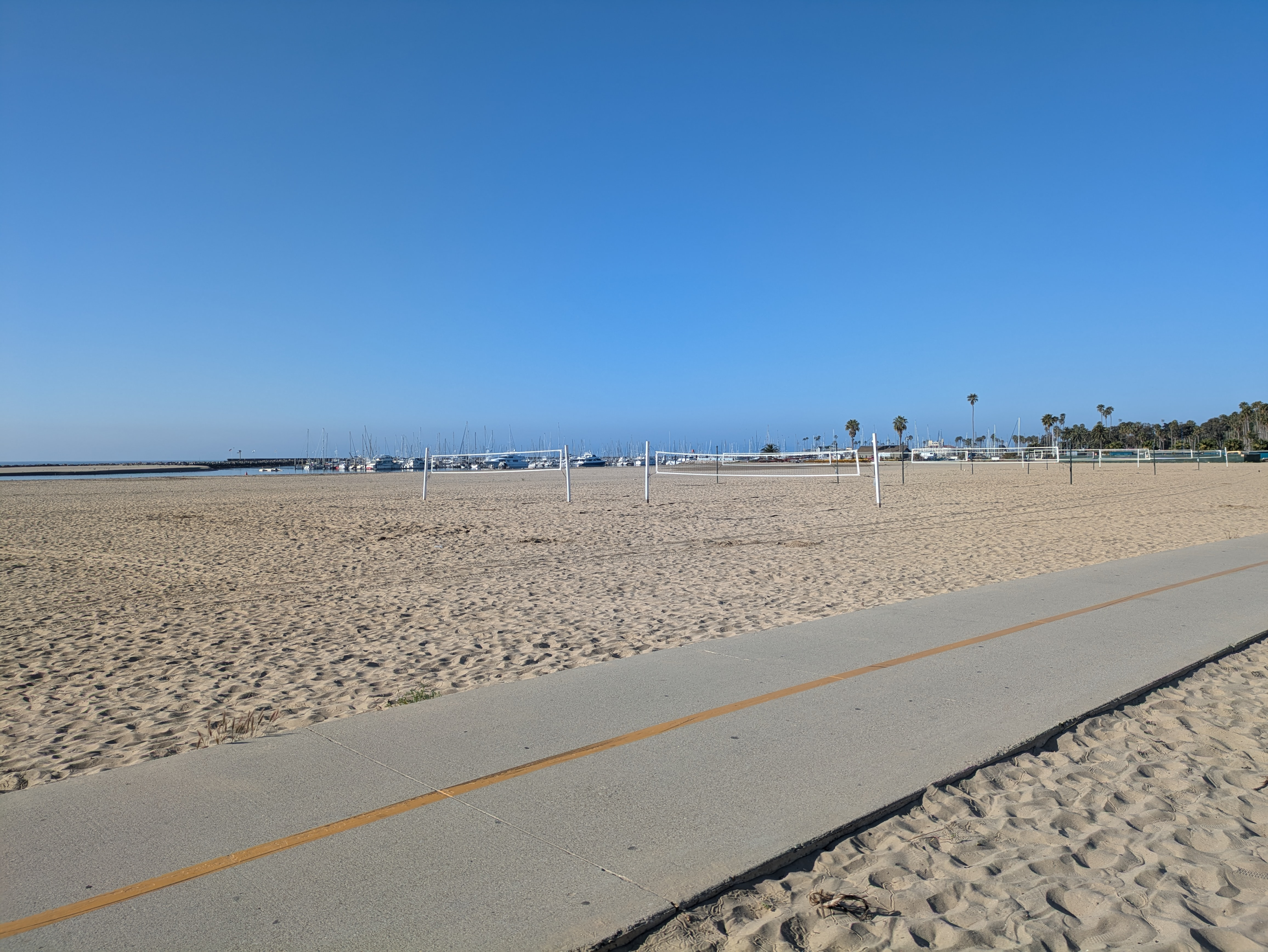
West Beach

West beach is in Santa Barbara, California. It is home to Santa Barbara's New Years and 4th of July Fireworks shows.

== Activities ==
Kayaking, windsurfing, and sailing are common activities.

=== West Beach Music & Arts Festival ===
West Beach is also the home to the West Beach Music & Arts Festival.

The 2008 lineup featured Ziggy Marley, Jason Mraz, Natasha Bedingfield, and Big Head Todd and the Monsters.

In 2009 the festival sold out.

In 2010, local government bureaucracy denied the event permit, resulting in an appeal of the decision by the organizers. In February 2009, with local politics and the Nederlander controlled Santa Barbara Bowl fiercely competing against the event, the Parks & Recreation director, went as far as to say the decision to deny the permit was unappealable. Citing due process in the United States Constitution to the City Council, the appeal process was allowed.

On May 19, 2010, the production company won the appeal to run the event and was granted its permit by the Park & Recreation Commission.

13 days later an appeal of this decision was filed. Three days past the allowable date for appeal - two appellants, Hilary Kleger, UCSB's associated student's "Community Advisor" and Tony Romasanta, owner of Harbor View Inn, separately submitted their appeals at the same time.

As a result of the appeals, the city made new requirements, which increased the costs, moved up deposit deadlines, and reduced the capacity of the festival. Forty days following the festival, the local production company, Twiin Productions, filed for Chapter 7 bankruptcy.
