= Joseph Plunkett (disambiguation) =

Joseph Plunkett (1887–1916) was an Irish republican, poet and journalist.

Joseph Plunkett may also refer to:

- Joseph Plunkett (American football)
- Joseph Plunkett (1900–1946), American architect in the firm of Edwards and Plunkett
- Joseph M. Plunkett, American politician, represented California's 17th senatorial district from 1901 to 1905
