= Santa Barbara Municipal Airport =

Municipal airport in Goleta, California, United States

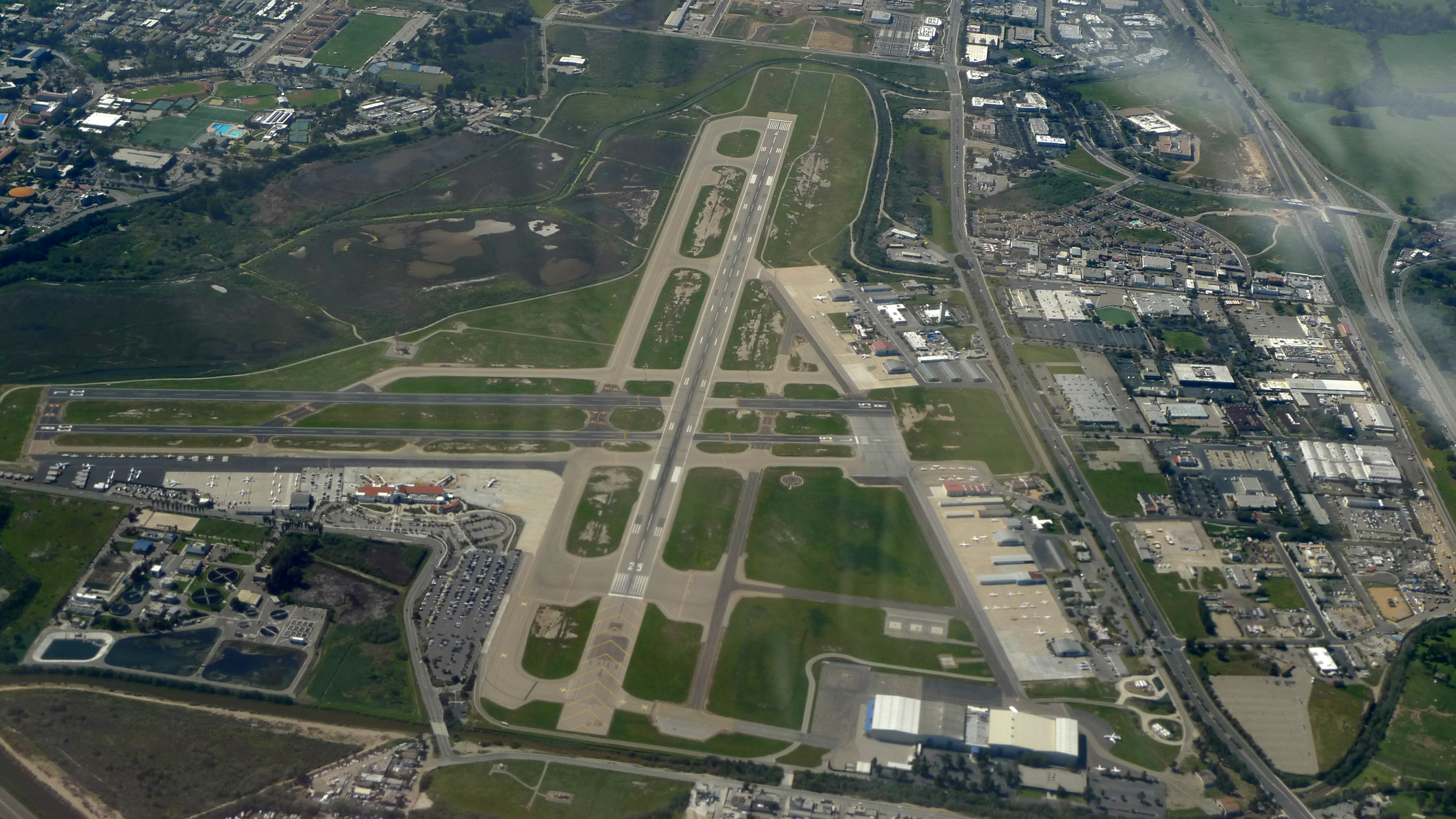
- Santa Barbara Municipal Airport, March 2015
- IATA: SBA; ICAO: KSBA; FAA LID: SBA

Summary
- Airport type: Public
- Owner: City of Santa Barbara
- Operator: Santa Barbara Airport Department
- Serves: Santa Barbara County, California
- Location: Santa Barbara, California, United States
- Elevation AMSL: 13 ft (4.0 m)
- Coordinates: 34°25′34″N 119°50′25″W
- Website: flysba.com

Maps
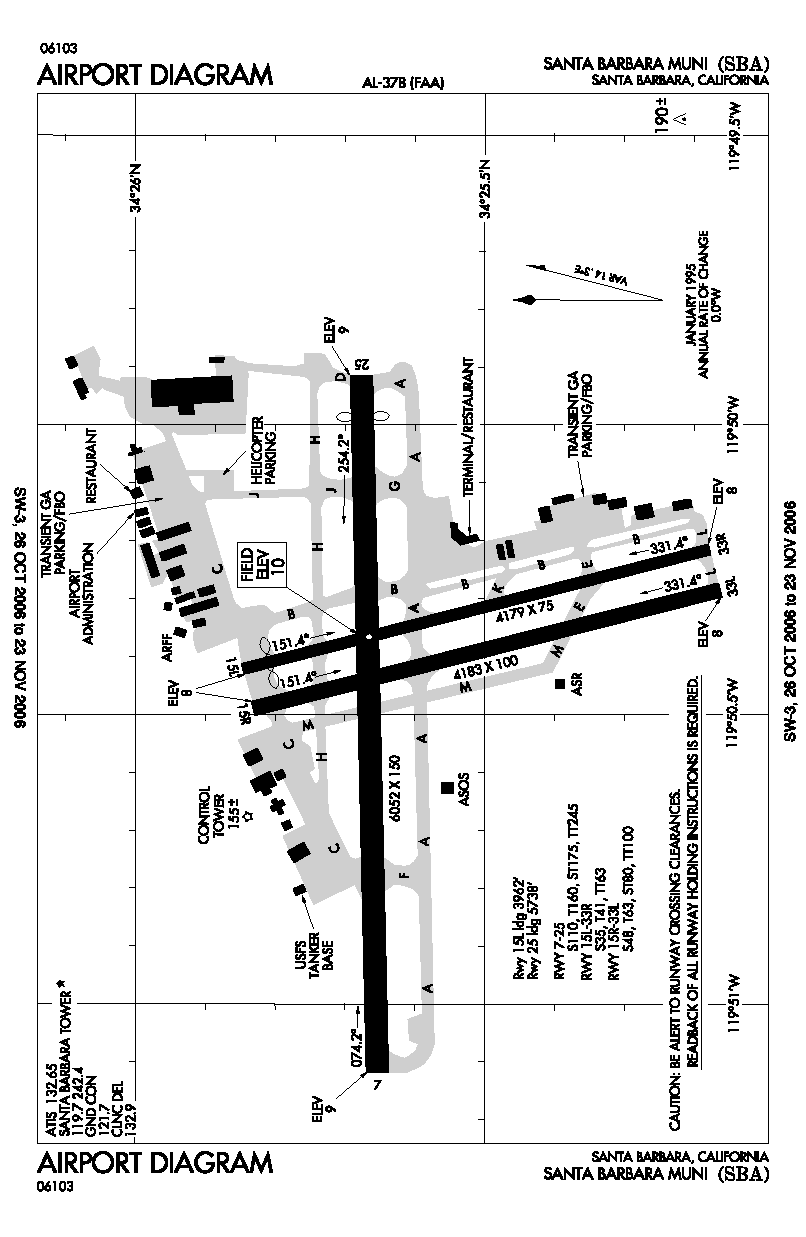
- FAA airport diagram
- Interactive map of Santa Barbara Municipal Airport

Runways
Direction	Length		Surface
Direction	ft	m	Surface
7/25	6,052	1,845	Asphalt
15L/33R	4,180	1,274	Asphalt
15R/33L	4,184	1,275	Asphalt

Statistics (2025)
- Aircraft operations (2024): 102,666
- Total Passengers: 1,481,605 ▲4.4%
- Source: Federal Aviation Administration

Santa Barbara Municipal Airport (IATA: SBA, ICAO: KSBA, FAA LID: SBA) is a public regional airport serving Santa Barbara and the surrounding area, in the U.S. state of California. It is owned and operated by the city of Santa Barbara, and is located 7 miles (6 nmi; 11 km) west of the city downtown. The airfield covers 948 acres (384 ha) of land and has three runways.

It is adjacent to the campus of the University of California, Santa Barbara and close to the city of Goleta. The airport was annexed to the city of Santa Barbara by a 7-mile-long (11 km), 300-foot-wide (91 m) corridor, mostly under the Pacific Ocean (a shoestring annexation). Most of the airport is 10 to 15 feet (3.0 to 4.6 m) above sea level and borders a wetland area, the Goleta Slough.

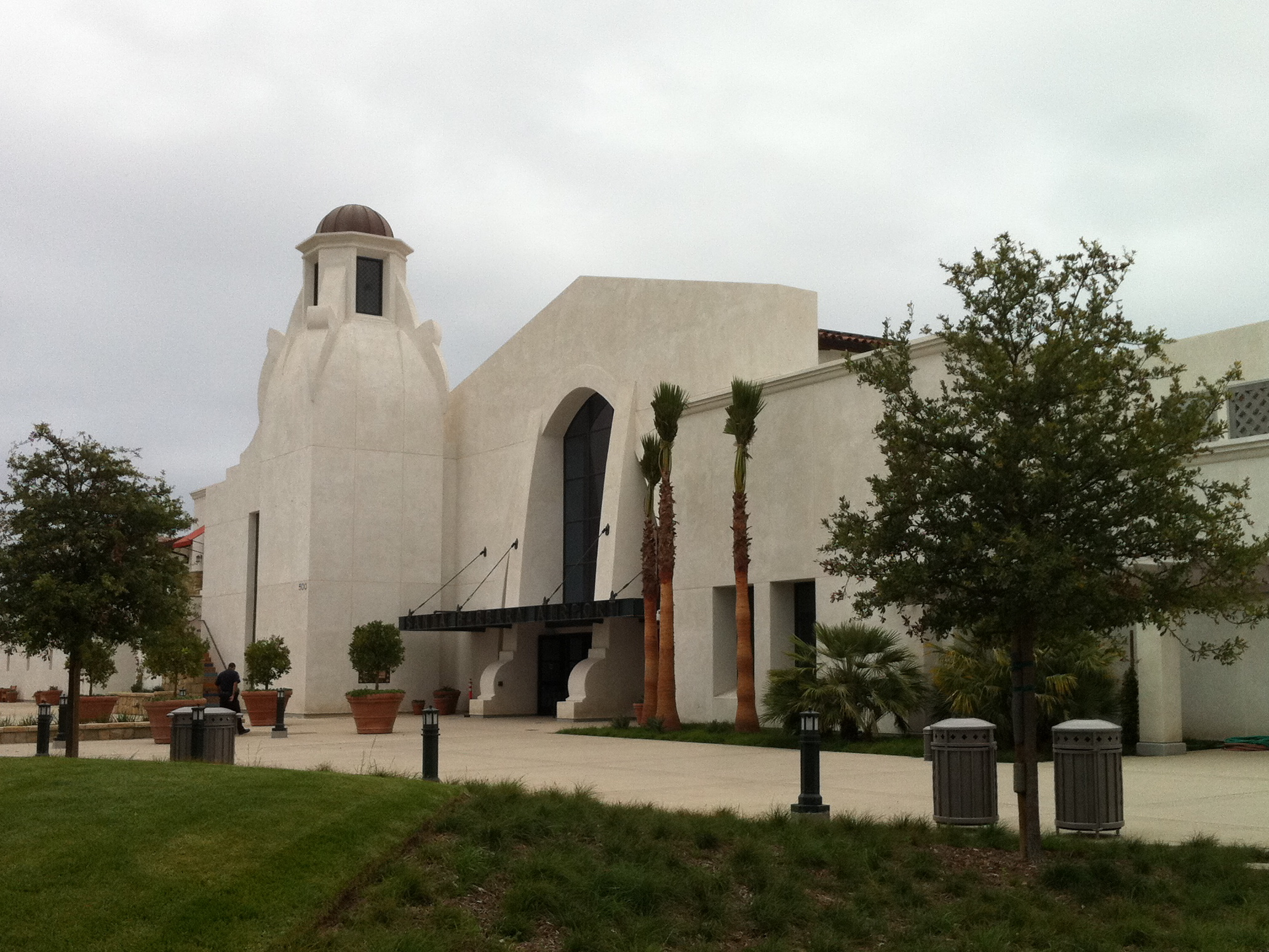
Santa Barbara Airport, new terminal

In 2024, the airport was categorized as a small hub primary airport by the Federal Aviation Administration (FAA), with 696,396 enplanements. As of December 2024, the airport is served by Alaska Airlines, American Airlines, Delta Air Lines, Southwest Airlines and United Airlines.

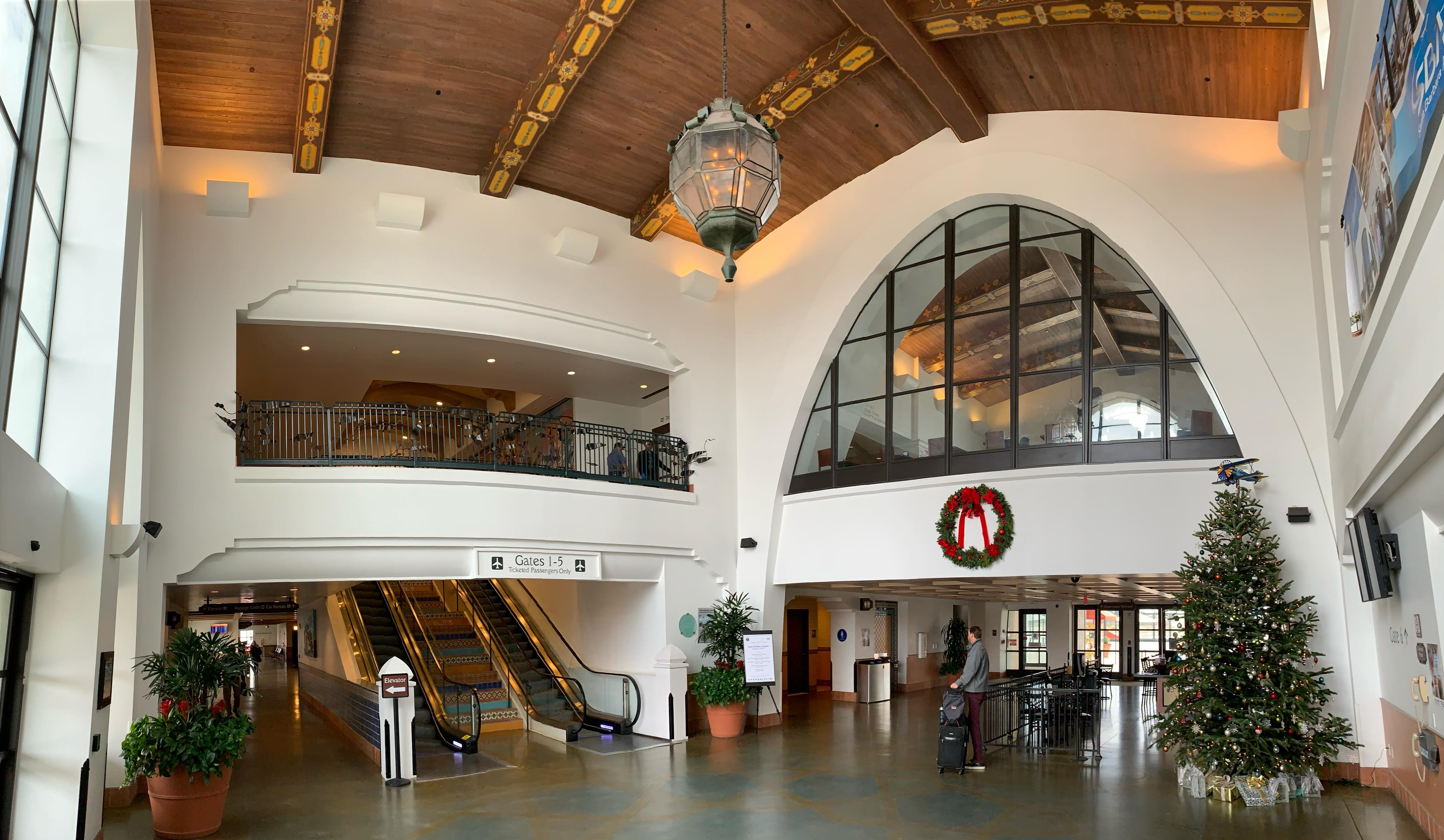
Central departure/arrival area (pre-security) at Santa Barbara Municipal Airport

== History ==
=== Early years ===
Aviation in the area began in 1914 when Lincoln J. Beachey flew an airplane across Goleta Valley. Two years later the Loughead brothers, who later changed their name to Lockheed, established a seaplane factory on State Street (Alco Hydro-Aeroplane Company) and constructed a wooden ramp on West Beach to launch their planes. In 1928, Gordon Sackett and Royce Stetson landed a Hisso-powered airplane in a cow pasture near the corner of Hollister and Fairview Avenues and set up a flight school. That first airstrip marked the beginning of what was to become the Santa Barbara Municipal Airport.

As airplane manufacturing grew in the late 1930s the airstrip developed into an airfield. Western General set up shop and began producing Meteor airplanes, while Santa Barbara Airways' founder Frederick Stearns II built two additional runways and two large hangars. Stearns also installed the first radio equipment at the airfield.

As war approached the United States Government established a program to build 250 airports across the country on a cost-sharing basis with local governments. Thomas M. Storke secured Santa Barbara's enrollment in the program, and in 1941 groundbreaking ceremonies were held for the Santa Barbara Municipal Airport.

With the outbreak of WWII the airport became MCAS Santa Barbara (Marine Corps Air Station Santa Barbara) in 1942, an aviator training base for the U.S Marines. It was expanded further with the addition of many hangars and other buildings, and reverted to a civilian airport in 1946.

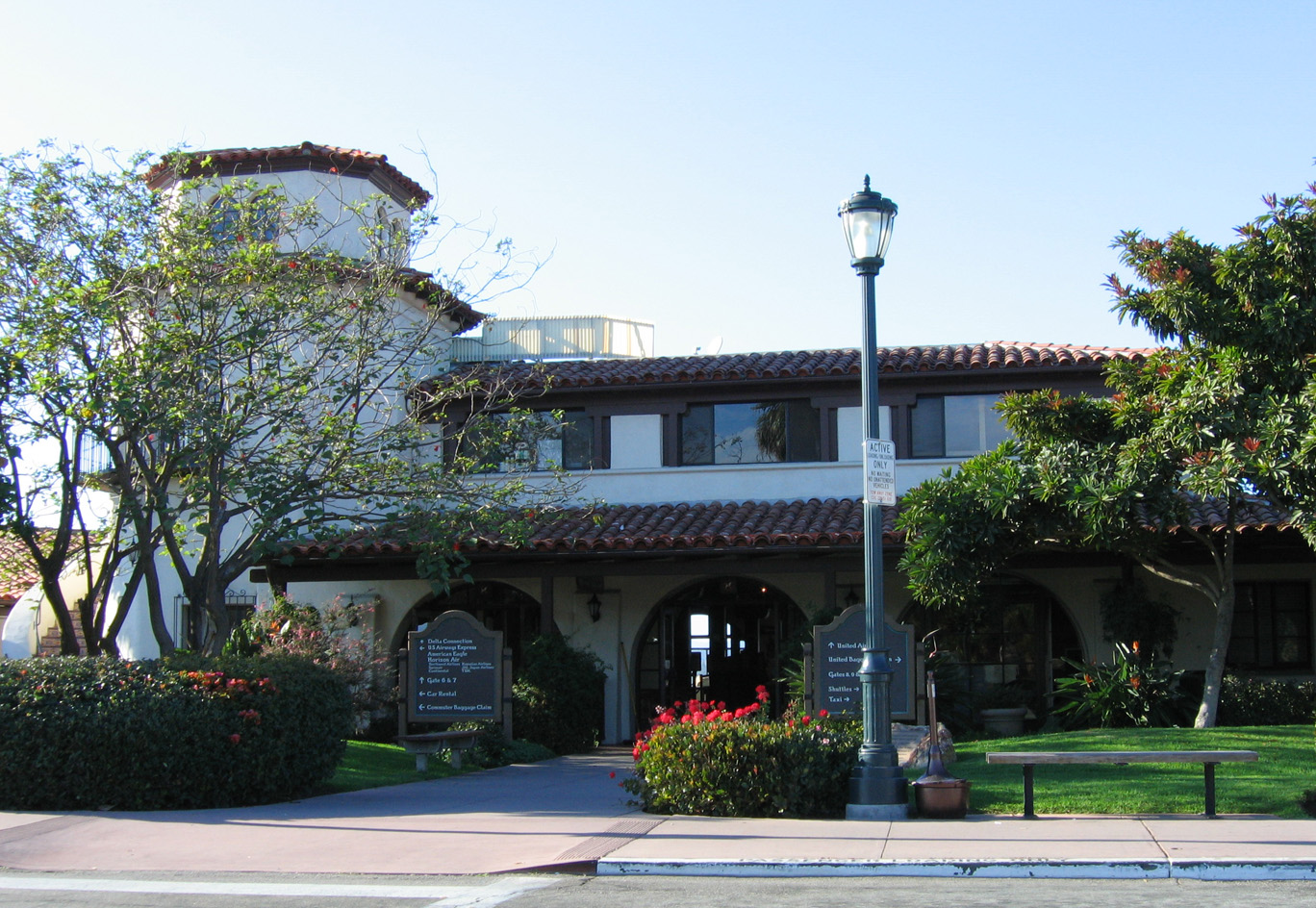
Original passenger terminal building designed by Edwards and Plunkett, 1942

The original Spanish-style terminal building, commissioned by United Airlines in 1942 was designed by William Edwards and Joseph Plunkett, an architectural team whose work, including the Arlington Theatre and the National Armory, helped shape the Mediterranean style of the city.

=== Postwar developments ===
In 1947 the Santa Barbara Flying Club was formed to promote general aviation in the region.

Three runways are in use: 7/25 and two parallel runways 15/33. The airport originally had an additional strip: runway 3/21. The development of the University of California, Santa Barbara (to the southwest) and the construction of hangars in support of production of the Aero Spacelines Super Guppy (to the northeast) were factors in the removal of this runway. The Aero Spacelines hangars were later occupied by Tracor Aviation, a company that modified airliners.

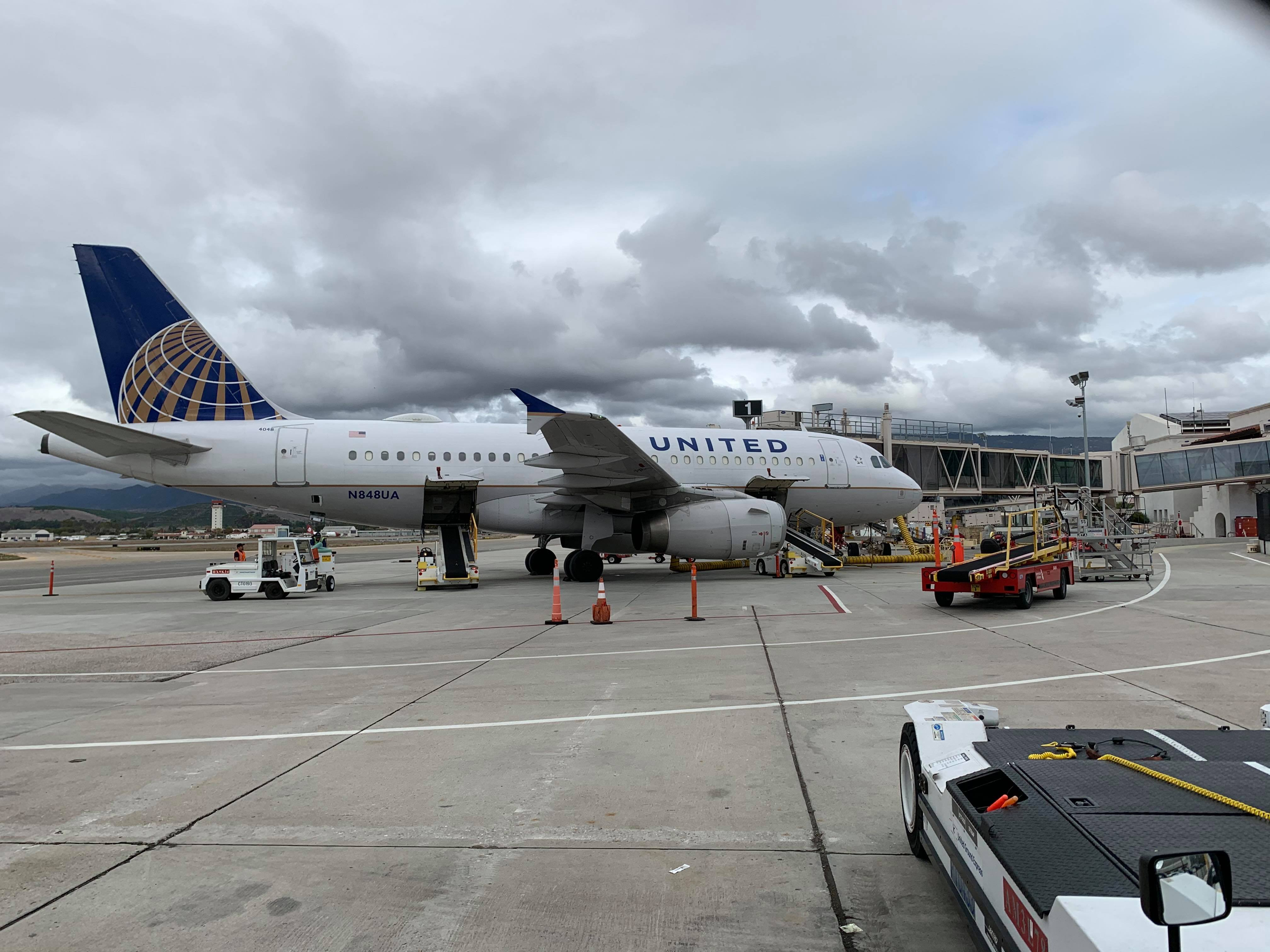
United Airlines Airbus A319-100 at Santa Barbara Municipal Airport (KSBA) preparing to board passengers for a return flight to Denver International Airport (KDEN) on December 5th, 2019.

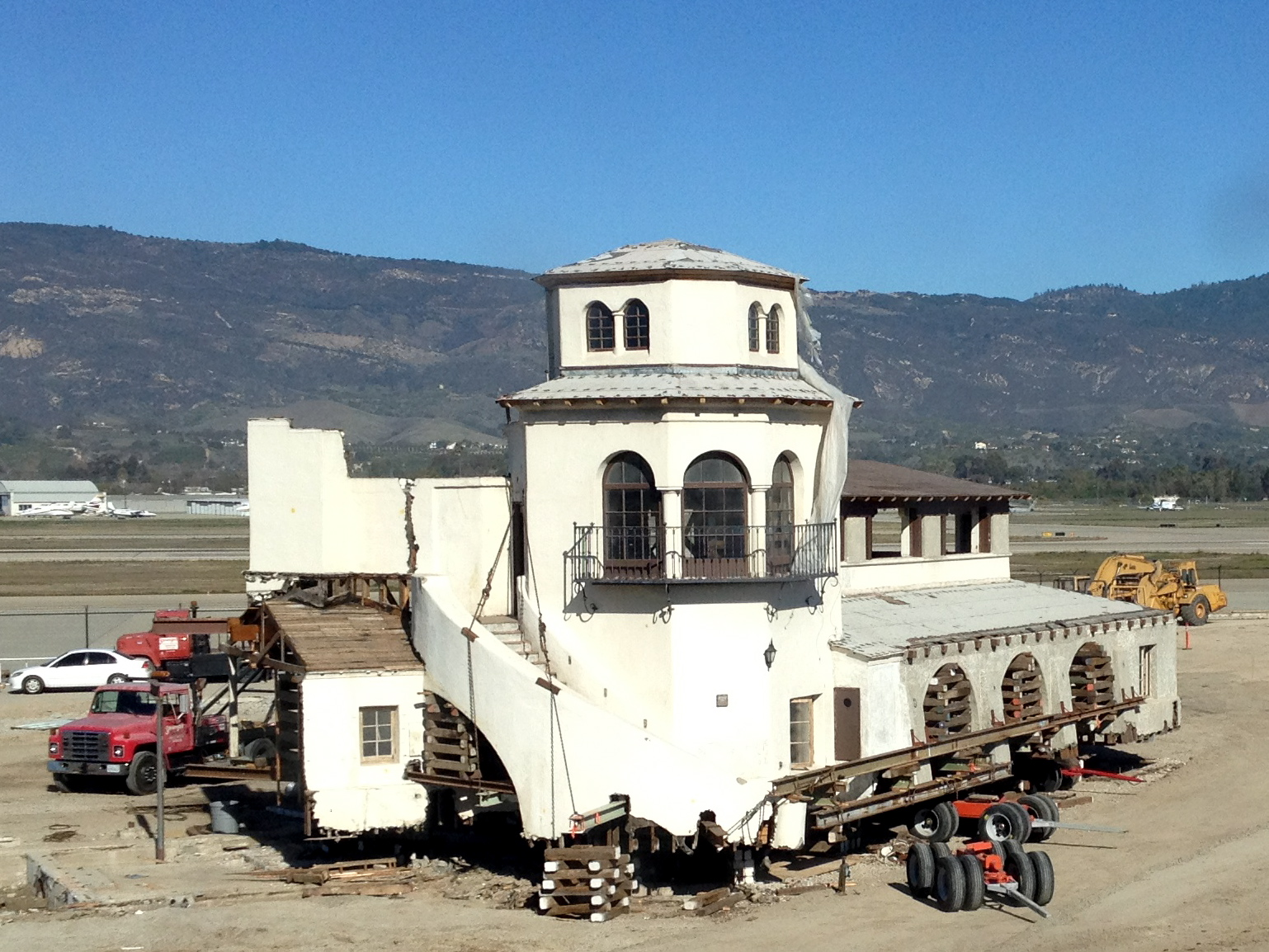
The original terminal building being prepared for moving and integration with the new terminal building

Additions to the historic terminal made in 1967 and 1976 were removed and the original building was restored. It then was raised to meet modern flood plain regulations, and moved and incorporated into the new terminal. The aircraft parking ramp was redesigned, and a new loop road and short term parking lot were constructed. The new terminal building features many environmentally sustainable elements and is registered with the U.S. Green Building Council Leadership in Energy and Environmental Design (LEED). It was originally designed to feature four glass passenger boarding bridges and four hardstands, but due to decreased flight activity, three jetbridges were constructed with five hardstands.

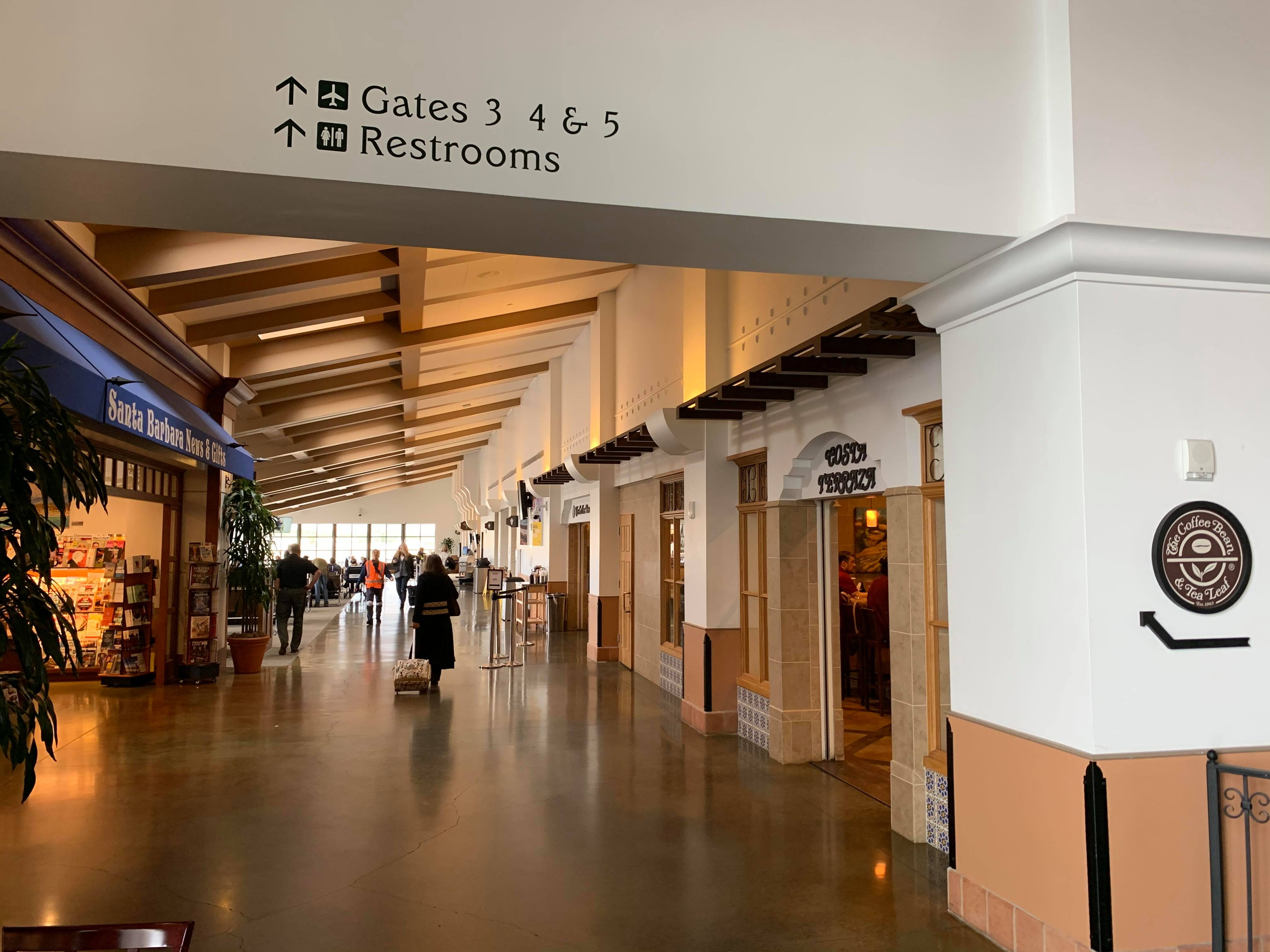
Concessions inside departure/arrival terminal at Santa Barbara Municipal Airport, including a Coffee Bean & Tea Leaf

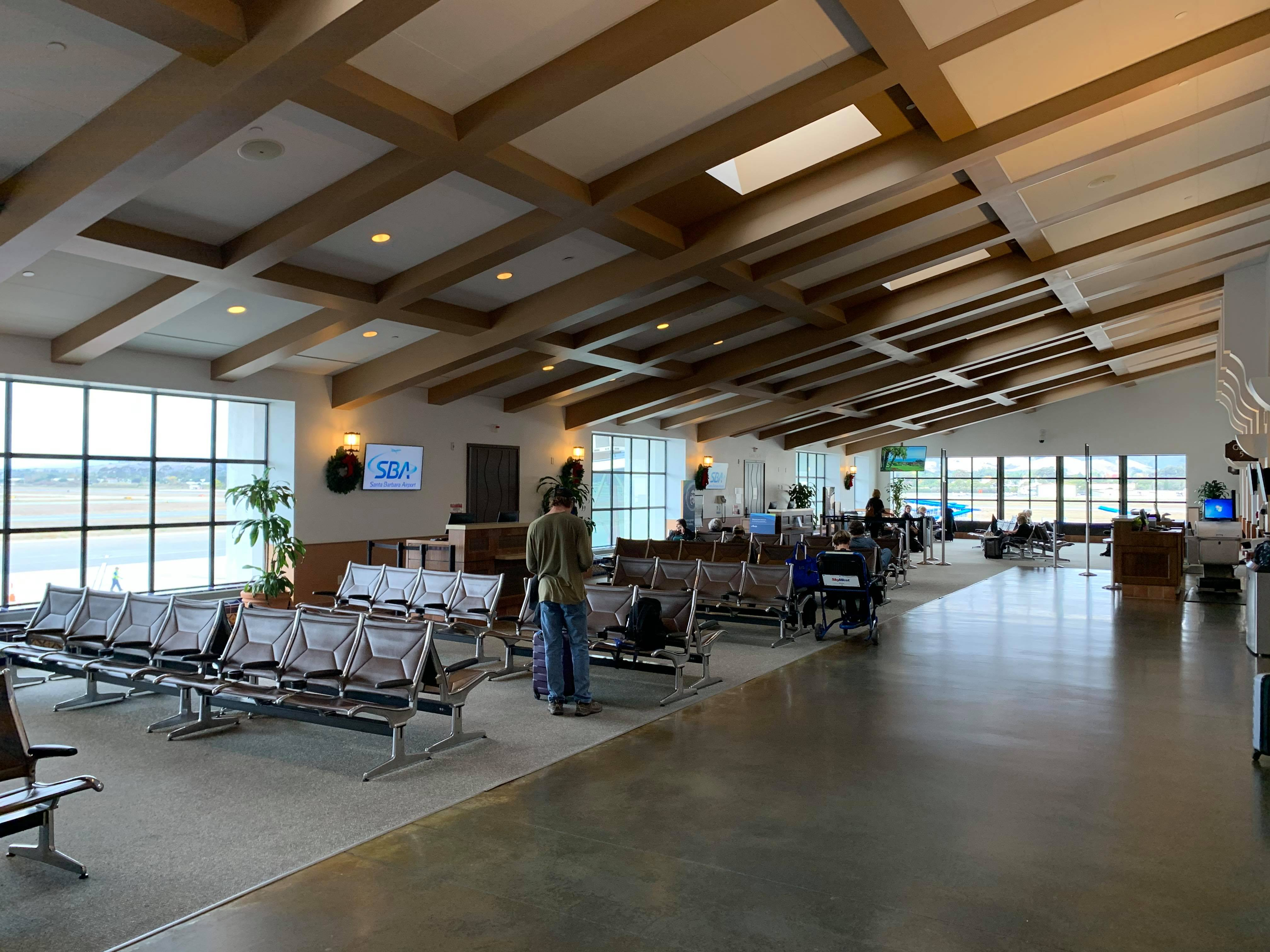
Gates 3-5 at Santa Barbara Municipal Airport

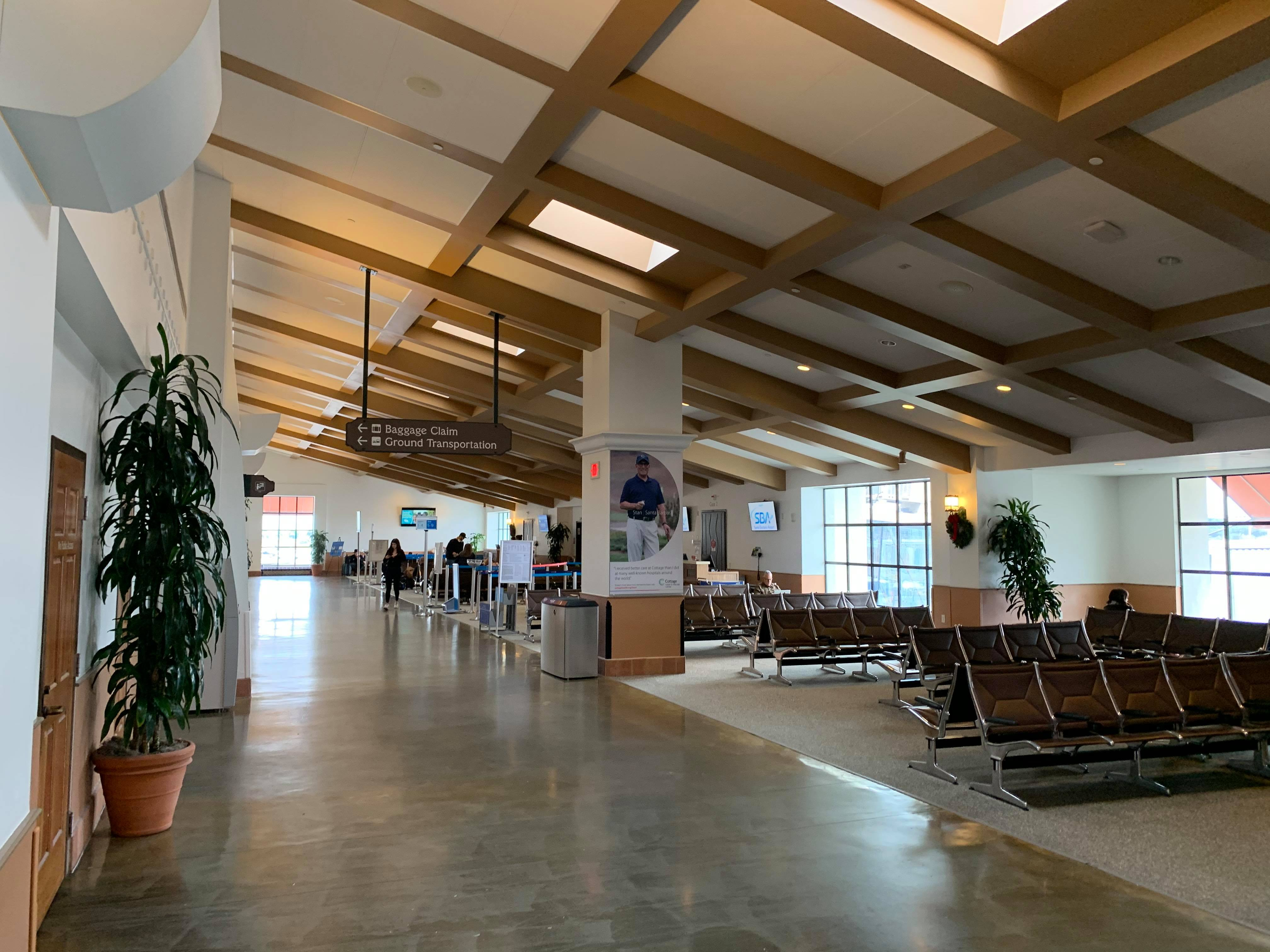
Gates 1 & 2 at Santa Barbara Municipal Airport

An Airport Master Plan was prepared in 2017. In late 2019, the fourth boarding bridge was installed to replace a hardstand to help the airport cope with increased flight activity and upgauging. Relocation of the car rental lot in 2025 allowed all four jetbridges to accommodate mainline aircraft, up from two previously. Rental Lot expanded in size.

== Services ==
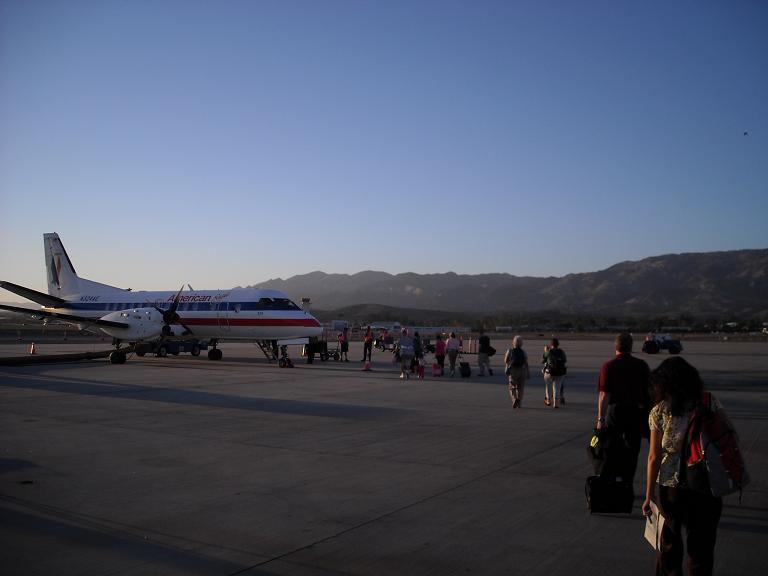
Passengers boarding an American Eagle Saab 340B turboprop aircraft for a flight to Los Angeles in October 2008

Airline flights began in 1932 on Pacific Seaboard Air Lines. In 1933, Pacific Seaboard was operating two daily round trip flights with single engine Bellanca CH-300s Los Angeles–Santa Barbara–Santa Maria–San Luis Obispo–Paso Robles–Monterey–Salinas–San Jose–San Francisco. Pacific Seaboard later moved its entire operation to the eastern U.S. and became Chicago and Southern Air Lines, a large domestic and international airline acquired by and merged into Delta Air Lines in 1953. United Airlines began flights from Santa Barbara/Goleta in 1936.

=== Southwest Airways and successors ===
Until 2002, Santa Barbara Airport was on a jet route to San Francisco and Los Angeles. The airport was served by Southwest Airways Douglas DC-3s and Martin 4-0-4s and by successors Pacific Air Lines, Air West and Hughes Airwest with Fairchild F-27s and Boeing 727-100, Douglas DC-9-10 and McDonnell Douglas DC-9-30 jets. The Southwest March 1, 1947, timetable lists two round trip DC-3s flying Los Angeles–Oxnard–Santa Barbara–Santa Maria–San Luis Obispo–Coalinga–Monterey–Santa Cruz/Watsonville–San Jose–San Francisco. Pacific Air Lines operated the first jet service into Santa Barbara in 1966 with Boeing 727-100s; the January 4, 1967, timetable lists 727s flying San Francisco–Monterey–Santa Barbara–Los Angeles. Air West served the airport with the 727-100s formerly operated by Pacific Air Lines while Hughes Airwest served Santa Barbara with DC-9-10s and DC-9-30s.

=== United ===
The United Airlines timetable dated February 1, 1937, listed a daily service operated with a Douglas DC-3 on a routing of Los Angeles–Santa Barbara–San Francisco–Oakland and back. By 1972 the United timetable listed direct Boeing 727-100s to New York/Newark via LAX and Milwaukee. The primary United routes from Santa Barbara were nonstops to Los Angeles and San Francisco with some continuing to other cities. The first nonstop flights beyond California were United 727s to Denver in 1979 and to Chicago O'Hare in 1980. United ceased mainline jet service to SBA in 1990. Shuttle by United, a division of United Airlines (later renamed United Shuttle) flew Boeing 737-300s and 737-500s to San Francisco in the 1990s and early 2000s. United then turned all service over to SkyWest Airlines, which now operates as United Express. Service was originally operated with Embraer EMB-120 Brasilia commuter propjets to SFO and LAX and CRJ200 regional jets to Denver. This was later turned over to a mix of SkyWest CRJ200, CRJ700, and E-175 regional jet aircraft. On June 8, 2017, United resumed seasonal mainline service to San Francisco and Denver. United resumed daily service to Chicago O'Hare on April 6, 2026.

=== American ===
American Airlines McDonnell Douglas MD-80s started flying to Dallas/Fort Worth in 1984, some on a triangle route DFW–Burbank–SBA–DFW or DFW–Bakersfield–SBA–DFW. American also flew MD-80s to Chicago O'Hare via Ontario. After American Airlines dropped mainline service to SBA, American Eagle Airlines, its affiliate, began flying Saab 340Bs and later Embraer ERJ-140s between SBA and LAX. American Eagle flew Canadair CRJ700s between SBA and DFW until April 2009. The airline flew SBA–LAX until November 14, 2012, when SkyWest Airlines (American Eagle) took over with Canadair CRJ200s. American Eagle suspended its flights to Los Angeles on March 31, 2014, ending American Airlines service at the airport. With the merger of US Airways and American, American Airlines returned to SBA with nonstop American Eagle regional jet service to Phoenix. In June 2016, American Eagle relaunched nonstop service to Dallas/Fort Worth on Mesa Airlines Canadair CRJ900s. On April 4, 2017, American Airlines began a seasonal mainline Airbus A319 flight to DFW, the first mainline service since 2015, when Frontier Airlines left Santa Barbara. In September 2019, the DFW flights have been replaced with once daily Boeing 737s.

=== Alaska ===
Alaska-owned regional airline Horizon Air was the first Alaska Airlines affiliate to connect SBA with Seattle and Portland, flying Canadair CRJ700s. From 2008 to 2010, Horizon also connected Santa Barbara non-stop to Sacramento and direct to Portland and/or Seattle. In 2011 SkyWest Airlines took over the Horizon CRJ700 jets and later replaced them with Embraer E-175s, replacing Horizon for all Alaska-branded flying into Santa Barbara and continues to operate flights via a capacity purchase agreement with Alaska Airlines. From June 15, 2017, to August 26, 2017, Horizon returned to Santa Barbara by taking over the Seattle route from SkyWest with its own Embraer E-175s. On August 27, 2017, Alaska Airlines began mainline service to Santa Barbara for the first time when it took over the Seattle route from Horizon with its own Boeing 737s. Currently, Alaska Airlines serves Seattle twice daily with E-175s and Boeing 737s. On April 22, 2026, Alaska Airlines resumed service to San Diego twice a day, with Embraer E-175s.

=== Sun Country ===
Sun Country Airlines was serving Santa Barbara twice weekly in 2018 between August and December to Minneapolis–St. Paul with Boeing 737s. Service began on August 16, 2018, and ended on December 9, 2018. On May 22, 2019, Sun Country resumed seasonal service with an increase to four times a week for the 2019 season. At the end of the 2019 season, Sun Country indicated that it did not plan to return.

=== Frontier ===
Frontier Airlines flew to Denver until 2015 with the Embraer 190 as well as Airbus A319 and Airbus A320 jets. After a multi-year hiatus, Frontier resumed service on August 21, 2018, with three times a week year-round service to Denver with the Airbus A320. In November 2019, they went seasonal and planned to return in 2020. However, due to COVID-19, no new date has been announced for the resumption of their service.

=== Contour ===
Contour Airlines began service on October 16, 2018. They flew daily to Oakland San Francisco Bay Airport and ten times a week to Las Vegas McCarran International Airport with 30-seat Embraer 135 regional jets. Contour then announced an expansion of Santa Barbara as a focus city, and added a flight to Sacramento International Airport in April 2019. However, Contour then ended all service on March 31, 2020, and terminated all contracts with employees and the airport.

=== Delta ===
Delta Air Lines began three daily flights to Salt Lake City International Airport in August 2019, via Delta Connection partner SkyWest Airlines. The flights were operated with Embraer 175 aircraft. However, because of COVID-19, the airline then suspended service indefinitely on July 8, 2020. On September 15, 2023, it was announced Delta Air Lines would return to Santa Barbara with twice daily service to Salt Lake City and once-daily service to Atlanta in summer 2024 on A220-300 aircraft. That service started on June 7, 2024.. On January 20, 2026, Delta once again cancelled its daily service to Atlanta due to logistical challenges.

=== Southwest Airlines ===
Southwest Airlines started operating flights into Santa Barbara on April 12, 2021, and has daily nonstop flights to Las Vegas (LAS), Oakland (OAK), Denver (DEN), and Sacramento (SMF). Service is operated with Boeing 737-700, Boeing 737-800, and Boeing 737 MAX 8 aircraft. Service to Phoenix was added on August 5th, 2025, with a non stop flight every Sunday.

=== Locally based commuter airlines ===
In the 1980s. Santa Barbara–based Apollo Airways, a commuter airline which subsequently changed its name to Pacific Coast Airlines, flew Handley Page HP.137 Jetstream propjets from the airport with nonstop service to Los Angeles, Las Vegas, San Francisco, San Jose (CA), Monterey, Fresno and Bakersfield with direct flights to Sacramento and Lake Tahoe. By the spring of 1982, Pacific Coast was operating nonstop service between Santa Barbara and Los Angeles, Las Vegas, Oakland, Ontario (CA), San Jose (CA), Sacramento, Bakersfield and Santa Maria. Another locally based airline was Connectair, operating Fairchild F-27J turboprops with nonstop flights to Los Angeles, Las Vegas and San Jose, California. Both Connectair and Pacific Coast are no longer in existence.

=== Past jet service ===
Pacific Air Lines flew Boeing 727-100s to Los Angeles, San Francisco and Monterey. Continental Airlines Boeing 737-300s flew nonstop to Denver (some flights stopped at Bakersfield enroute from SBA). Air West (later renamed Hughes Airwest) Boeing 727-100s, Douglas DC-9-10s, and McDonnell Douglas DC-9-30s flew to Los Angeles, San Francisco, Las Vegas and other cities. Allegiant Air McDonnell Douglas MD-80s flew to Las Vegas. Pacific Express BAC One-Elevens flew to Los Angeles, San Francisco and Bakersfield. Air Wisconsin (United Express) BAe 146-200s and BAe 146-300s flew to Denver, and ExpressJet flew Embraer ERJ-145s nonstop to Sacramento and San Diego.

=== Other past commuter airline service ===
A number of commuter air carriers served Santa Barbara over the years primarily with turboprop aircraft. In 1968, Cable Commuter Airlines was operating de Havilland Canada DHC-6 Twin Otter service to LAX. Cable Commuter was then acquired by Golden West Airlines which in turn began operating high frequency shuttle service to LAX with de Havilland Canada DHC-6 Twin Otter, de Havilland Canada DHC-7 Dash 7 and Short 330 aircraft. According to the Official Airline Guide (OAG), by 1981 Golden West was the only airline operating scheduled service between Santa Barbara and Los Angeles with fourteen round trip flights on weekdays. Other commuter air carriers that served SBA with turboprop aircraft in later years included America West Express, American Eagle operated by Wings West, Dash Air, Delta Connection operated by SkyWest Airlines, Imperial Airlines, Sun Aire Lines, United Express operated by West Air and later by SkyWest Airlines, USAir Express and successor US Airways Express operated by Trans States Airlines and StatesWest Airlines. According to the OAG, turboprop aircraft operated into SBA by these commuter airlines included the Beechcraft 1900C, British Aerospace BAe Jetstream 31, de Havilland Canada DHC-8 Dash 8, Embraer EMB-110 Bandeirante, Embraer EMB-120 Brasilia, Fairchild Swearingen Metroliner (Metro II and Metro III models), Saab 340B and Short 360. In addition, Air Resorts operated Convair 440 prop aircraft on flights to LAX in 1983.

=== Current air service ===
Alaska Airlines serves Seattle and Portland with SkyWest and Horizon E-175s. Seattle also sees service on Boeing 737s.

American Airlines serves Phoenix and Dallas with Airbus A320 family, CRJ700s, E-175s, and Boeing 737s.

Delta Air Lines serves Salt Lake City with Embraer E-175s.

Southwest Airlines serves Denver, Las Vegas, Oakland, Phoenix, and Sacramento with Boeing 737s.

United Airlines serves Los Angeles with Embraer E-175s. United serves San Francisco and Denver with a mix of E-175s, Airbus A320 family, and Boeing 737s.

== Airlines and destinations ==
=== Passenger ===
Airlines	Destinations	Refs
Alaska Airlines	Portland (OR), San Diego, Seattle/Tacoma	
American Airlines	Dallas/Fort Worth; Seasonal: Phoenix–Sky Harbor	
American Eagle	Phoenix–Sky Harbor	
Delta Connection	Salt Lake City	
Southwest Airlines	Denver, Las Vegas, Oakland, Phoenix–Sky Harbor, Sacramento, San Diego	
United Airlines	Chicago–O'Hare, Denver, San Francisco	
United Express	Denver, Los Angeles, San Francisco	

== Statistics ==
=== Top destinations ===
Busiest routes from SBA (May 2025 – April 2026)
Rank	Airport	Passengers	Carriers
1	Denver, Colorado	131,970	Southwest, United
2	San Francisco, California	122,750	United
3	Phoenix–Sky Harbor, Arizona	105,330	American, Southwest
4	Las Vegas, Nevada	86,790	Southwest
5	Salt Lake City, Utah	55,870	Delta
6	Seattle/Tacoma, Washington	53,600	Alaska
7	Dallas/Fort Worth, Texas	50,280	American
8	Sacramento, California	32,170	Southwest
9	Los Angeles, California	28,240	United
10	Atlanta, Georgia	27,210	Delta

=== Airline market share ===
Largest airlines at SBA (May 2025 – April 2026)
Rank	Airline	Passengers	Share
1	United	407,000	27.42%
2	Southwest	333,000	22.46%
3	SkyWest	270,000	18.22%
4	American	221,000	14.87%
5	Alaska	84,560	5.70%
–	Other	168,000	11.33%

=== Annual traffic ===
Annual passenger traffic at SBA (enplaned + deplaned) 1998 through present
Year	Passengers
1998	823,160
1999	792,548
2000	776,904
2001	725,140
2002	731,464
2003	752,762
2004	823,935
2005	855,371
2006	858,549
2007	819,327
2008	817,093
2009	746,730
2010	754,071
2011	721,551
2012	727,679
2013	708,854
2014	662,661
2015	627,048
2016	658,955
2017	710,614
2018	785,819
2019	998,691
2020	382,090
2021	873,374
2022	1,219,581
2023	1,277,545
2024	1,418,996
2025	1,481,605

== Ground transportation ==
The airport is located off of State Route 217 at the Sandspit Road exit. It can also be reached from US 101 by taking State Route 217 or exiting off of Fairview Avenue. Short-term and long-term parking are available at the terminal, while the economy parking lot is located near Lopez Road and Hollister Avenue, north of the airport.

Santa Barbara MTD Route 11 stops on Moffett Road across from the terminals and connects to the MTD Transit Center, which is approximately one mile from the Santa Barbara station, served by Amtrak.

Taxis and private shuttles depart from designated zones outside the terminal.

== Accidents and incidents ==
- April 8, 1985: The non-instrument-rated pilot of a Cessna P210N, aircraft registration N6099P, was killed when the aircraft crashed into the ocean about 1 mile (1.6 km) south of the airport after departing in low visibility. The National Transportation Safety Board (NTSB) attributed the accident to spatial disorientation and the pilot's decision to continue flying under visual flight rules into instrument meteorological conditions (continued VFR into IMC).
- July 23, 1985: A student pilot and a passenger in a Cessna 150L, N11490, were killed when the aircraft crashed on Runway 25 and was consumed by fire following a late-night takeoff. The accident was attributed to a failure to maintain airspeed, an inadvertent stall, and the pilot's alcohol intoxication. The pilot also had not received any formal instruction in night flying, and his "lack of recent experience in type operation" and "overconfidence in personal ability" were cited by the NTSB as contributing factors.
- October 30, 1986: The two pilots of a Fairchild Swearingen SA-226TC Metroliner, N6099P, operated by Wings West Airlines on a scheduled commuter flight for American Eagle carrying 12 passengers, performed a gear-up landing after intentionally disabling the landing gear warning horn and subsequently neglecting to lower the landing gear. As the aircraft struck the runway, fragments of the starboard propeller punctured the passenger cabin, causing serious injuries to one passenger and minor injuries to another; an additional passenger suffered unspecified minor injuries. The NTSB attributed the accident to the crew's failure to follow proper procedures, their disabling of the landing gear warning system, and the captain's inadequate supervision of the first officer, who was flying the aircraft at the time.
- May 17, 1990: A Cessna 150H, N7156S, disappeared over the ocean during night touch-and-go landing practice. A pair of wheel chocks bearing the aircraft's number were among the few items recovered; the pilot and passenger were presumed dead. The NTSB attributed the accident to "[t]he pilot's failure to maintain control of the airplane. Factors which contributed to the accident were the dark night and the pilot's lack of night flying experience."
- October 21, 1990: A Cessna 172M, N13670, descended steeply and crashed while maneuvering in the airfield traffic pattern. The pilot and two passengers were seriously injured, the other passenger was killed, and the aircraft was destroyed. The NTSB attributed the accident to "[t]he pilot's failure to maintain proper glidepath while on final approach. A contributing factor was sunglare."
- June 28, 1991: The 4 occupants of a Mitsubishi MU-2B-36A, N2CJ, were killed when the aircraft crashed into the ocean in low visibility while maneuvering to maintain spacing from another aircraft that was on an Instrument Landing System (ILS) approach. The NTSB attributed the accident to "[t]he pilot's failure to maintain directional control of the airplane after becoming spatially disoriented. Factors related to the accident were: darkness, low overcast cloud condition, the pilot's decision to continue VFR flight into instrument meteorological conditions (IMC), which resulted in a near collision with another aircraft, his self induced pressure and diversion of attention, while coping with the situation that he had encountered."
- June 7, 1996: A Piper PA-32R-300, N4303X, crashed into the ocean during an ILS approach to Runway 7 in fog; the two pilots were killed. The NTSB attributed the accident to "failure of the flying pilot to maintain control of the airplane, due to spatial disorientation, which resulted in an uncontrolled descent and collision with the water. Factors relating to the accident were: the lack of recent instrument experience by the flying pilot and the lack of monitoring (and/or remedial action) by the other pilot."
- November 20, 1996: A Beechcraft 95-B55 Baron, N210WW, crashed into rising terrain during an ILS approach to Runway 7 in low visibility; the pilot, who was the sole occupant, was killed. The pilot had not been responding properly to controllers' instructions and had failed his last instrument proficiency review. The NTSB attributed the accident to "failure of the pilot to maintain control of the aircraft during an instrument approach, due to spatial disorientation, and/or his failure to maintain proper altitude. Factors relating to the accident were: the pilot's delay (or failure) to initiate a missed approach, and his lack of instrument competency."
- December 6, 2016: An Airborne Windsports Edge XT-912-L, N188M, descended and crashed near the airport. The pilot, who was the sole occupant, was killed. The NTSB attributed the accident to "[t]he pilot's failure to maintain aircraft control while maneuvering in the traffic pattern."
- August 25, 2019: A private Lockheed C-130A, N119TG, was badly damaged in a runway excursion. After departing from Santa Maria Public Airport, passengers heard a "loud bang," the cabin began to fill with smoke and misting hydraulic fluid, and the aircraft began having engine and hydraulic system problems. The pilots shut down the outer right-hand engine and made an emergency landing on Runway 7 at Santa Barbara, but they could not maintain directional control, prompting the captain to initiate a ground loop to avoid plowing into buildings and parked aircraft. The seven people on board were not injured, but airport lighting and signage were damaged, halting all flight operations for 19 hours. The NTSB attributed the accident to corrosion-related breakage of the number 3 bleed air duct, which blew hot air towards nearby wiring and hydraulic lines.
- January 29, 2025: A Cirrus SR22, N124LZ, crashed in a field north of the Storke Road-U.S. Route 101 interchange in Goleta after a CAPS parachute descent, critically injuring the two pilots. The Cirrus had departed from Santa Barbara Municipal Airport 25 minutes earlier and was believed to be returning to land. An intense fire destroyed the wreckage and started a small wildfire, but it was unclear whether the fire started before or after the crash. There were no passengers on board. The FAA and NTSB launched investigations.

== In popular culture ==
In the 1951 war film Flying Leathernecks, John Wayne's character was stationed in Goleta. The movie references the airbase as being in Goleta because, during World War II, the airbase had not yet been annexed by Santa Barbara. The movie has a short clip of the airport and surrounding area.

Scenes from the comedy Deal of the Century were shot at the Airport in 1983.
