= Janssens–Orella–Birk Building =

- U.S. National Register of Historic Places
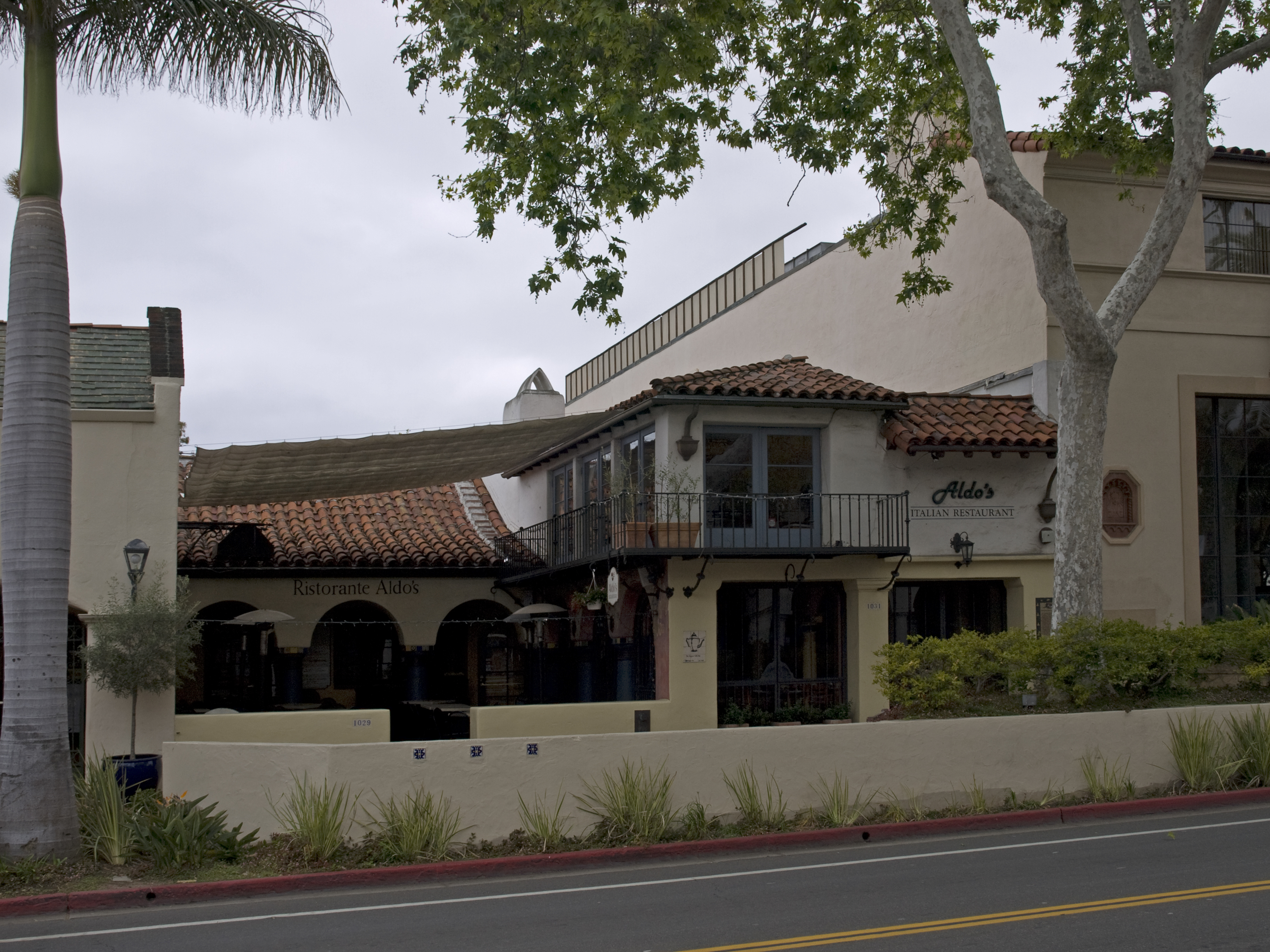
- View from State Street

- Location within California Location within the United States
- Location: 1029-1031 State St., Santa Barbara, California
- Coordinates: 34°25′19.6″N 119°42′11″W
- Built: 1927-1937
- Architect: Edwards, Plunkett, and Howell
- Architectural style: Spanish Colonial Revival
- NRHP reference No.: 87001170
- Added to NRHP: July 16, 1987

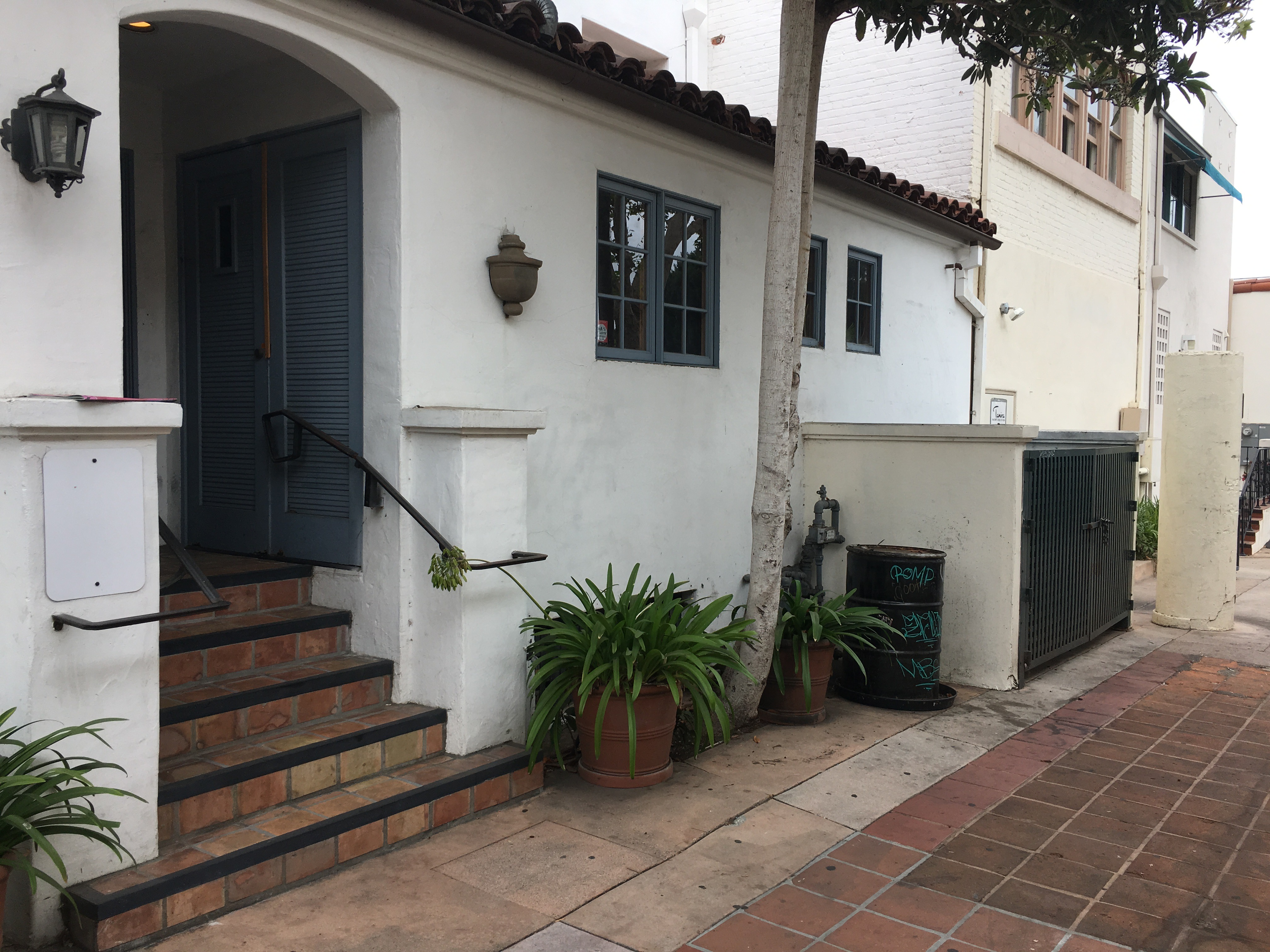
IM 1029 state 93101 back of building

The Janssens–Orella–Birk Building, also known as Janssens–Orella Building, was built in 1927 and considerably remodelled in 1937 and later in 1941. It was listed on the National Register of Historic Places in 1987. The building is located on State Street, in the historical center of Santa Barbara, California.

== History ==
The first adobe building on the site was constructed by Augustin Jansens, a Belgian native, and his wife, Maria Antonia Pico. In 1872, it was bought by a local landowner, Bruno Orella, also notable for Orella Adobes, and his wife, Mercedes Gonzalez. The descendants of the Orella family owned the building until the 1950s. From the original building, fragments of the walls are incorporated in the current structure.

In 1927, a new house in the Spanish Colonial Revival style was constructed. The project was designed by local architectural firm Edwards, Plunkett, and Howell. In 1932, the building was expanded, in 1946 remodeled, and in 1987 it was returned to the original 1937 shape. After World War II, the building hosted the Copper Coffee Pot restaurant established in memory of a doctor, John Manning, and managed by his wife. The restaurant was a popular social place. It closed on September 30, 1985. The last owner of the restaurant was Birk, hence the name of the building. Currently, the building is occupied by an Italian restaurant with a different name.

== Architecture ==
The Janssens–Orella–Birk Building is a two-floor structures which is L-shaped and has both flat roof and tile parts. The front of the building is on State Street, the main commercial street in downtown Santa Barbara, and it is located between two buildings constructed much later but built in a similar style. The exterior repeats the original 1927 design, whereas the interior has been considerably altered by later changes. The rear of the building faces a secondary passages and a parking lot. State Street runs on the slope of the hill and the building is therefore skewed.

The northeastern (facing State Street) facade features a balcony and is open as a central patio. On the left side of the patio, there is a wall fountain in the shape of a lion head.
