= Arlington Theatre =

Theater in Santa Barbara, California

Coordinates: 34.4179°N 119.697°W

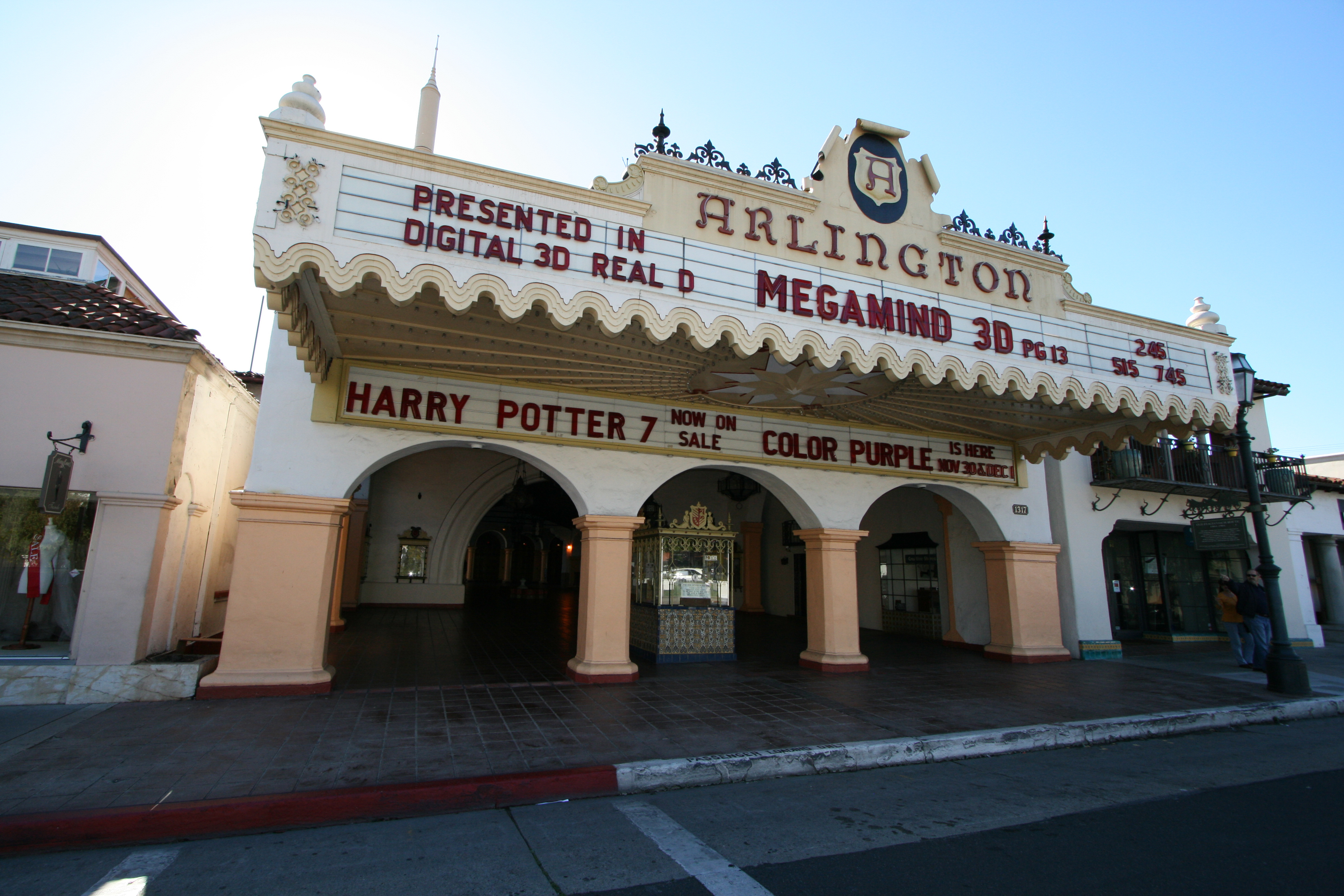
- Front of the Arlington with ticket booth at center
- Interactive map of Arlington Theatre
- Address: 1317 State Street; Santa Barbara, California; United States
- Capacity: 2,018

Construction
- Opened: May 22, 1931
- Reopened: May 22, 1976
- Architect: Edwards and Plunkett

Website
- arlingtontheatresb.com

The Arlington Theatre is a historic movie theatre in Santa Barbara, California, United States. Combining the Mission Revival and Spanish Colonial Revival styles of architecture, it the largest movie theater and principal performing arts venue in the city, seating 2,010. In addition to regular screenings and artists, it is home to many events associated with the annual Santa Barbara International Film Festival.

== History ==
The Arlington was built at 1317 State Street, on the former site of the Arlington Hotel that was destroyed following the 1925 Santa Barbara earthquake. The current structure was erected in 1930 as a showcase movie house for Fox West Coast Theaters. It was restored and expanded in the mid-1970s by Metropolitan Theatres, reopening in 1976.

In March 2024, its operator, Metropolitan Theatres, declared Chapter 11 bankruptcy. The company stated that the theater will not be affected and will continue to operate normally during the bankruptcy procedure.

== Architecture and design ==
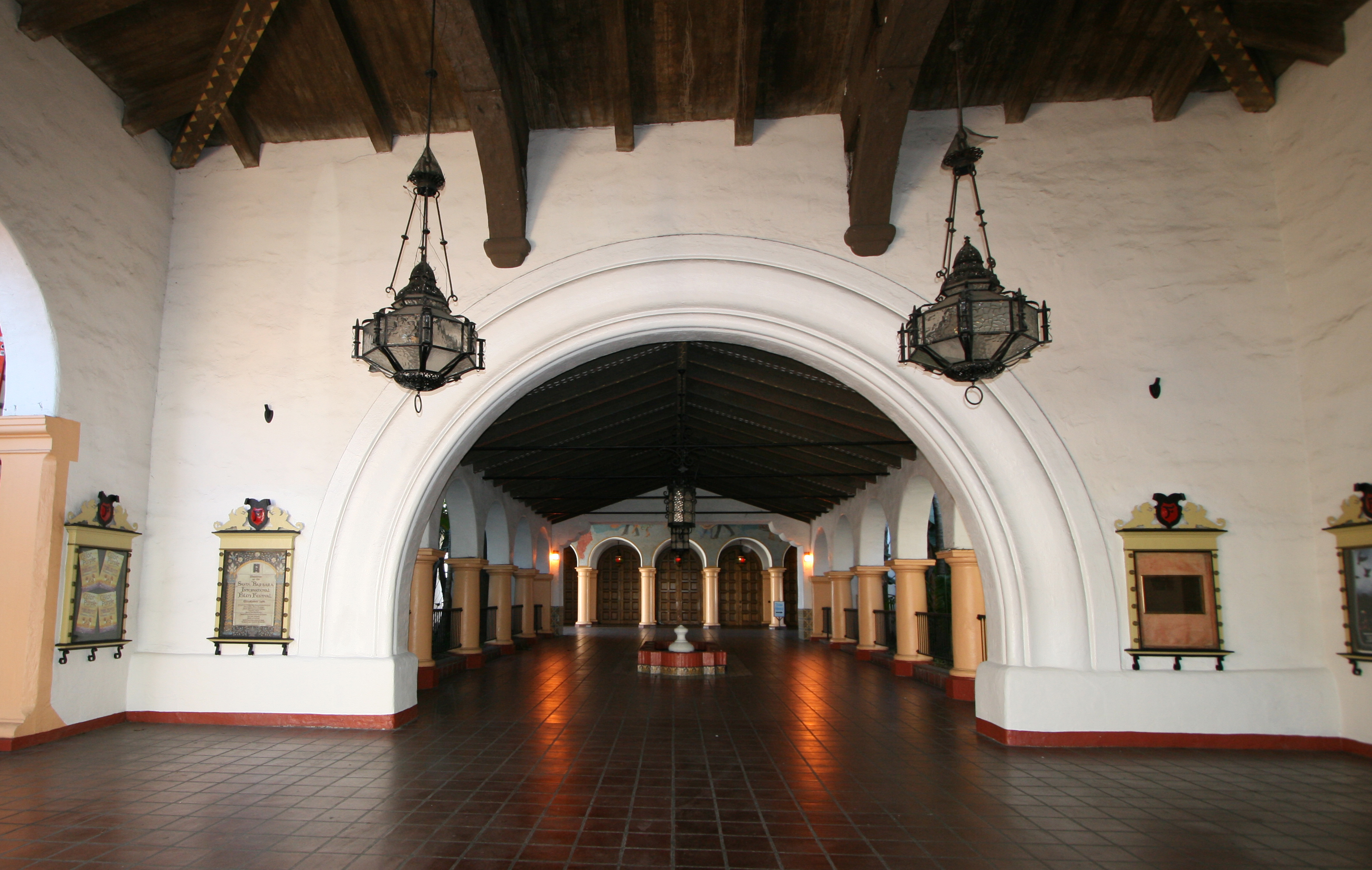
Looking toward the entry, just past the ticket booth

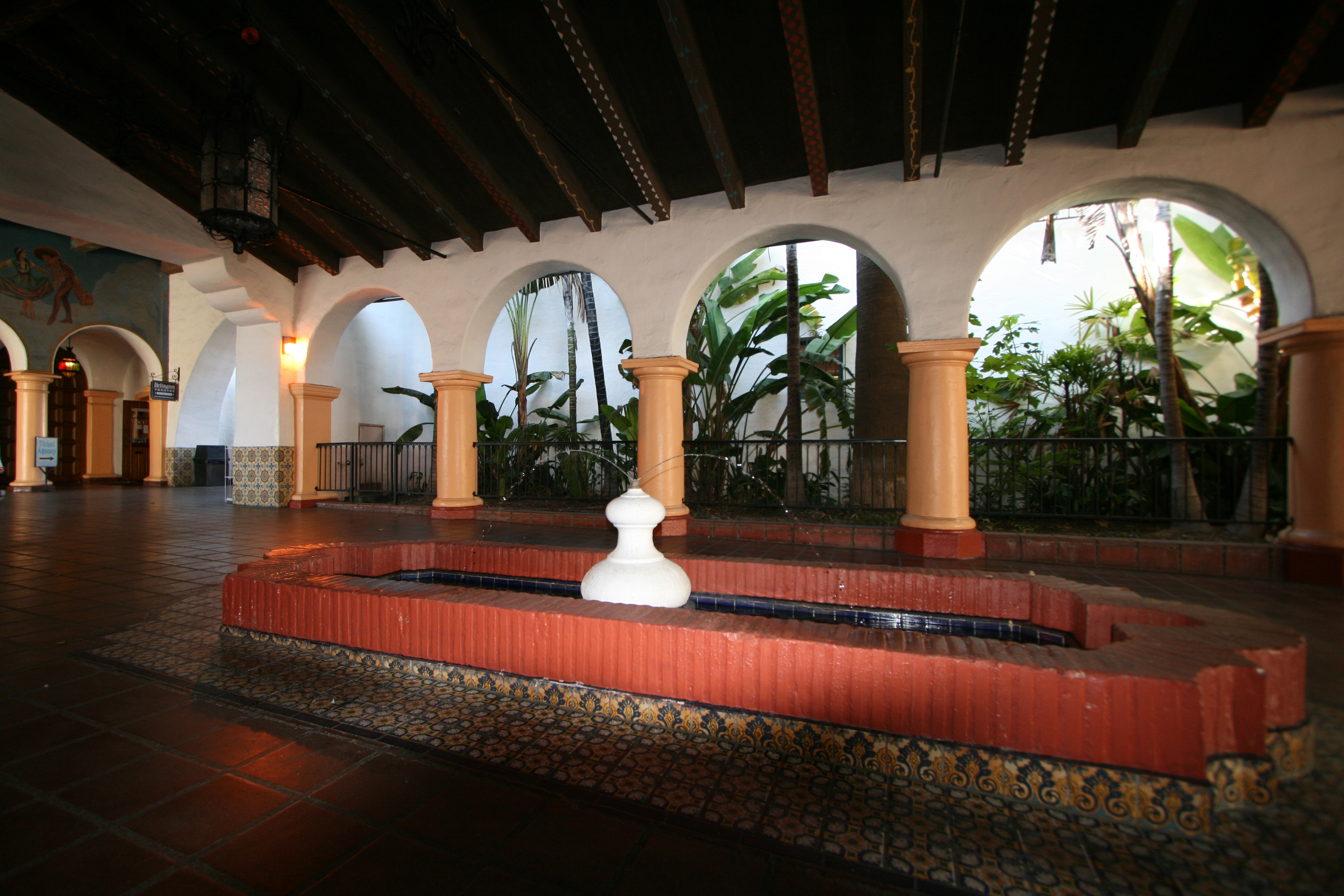
Fountain in the center of the hallway

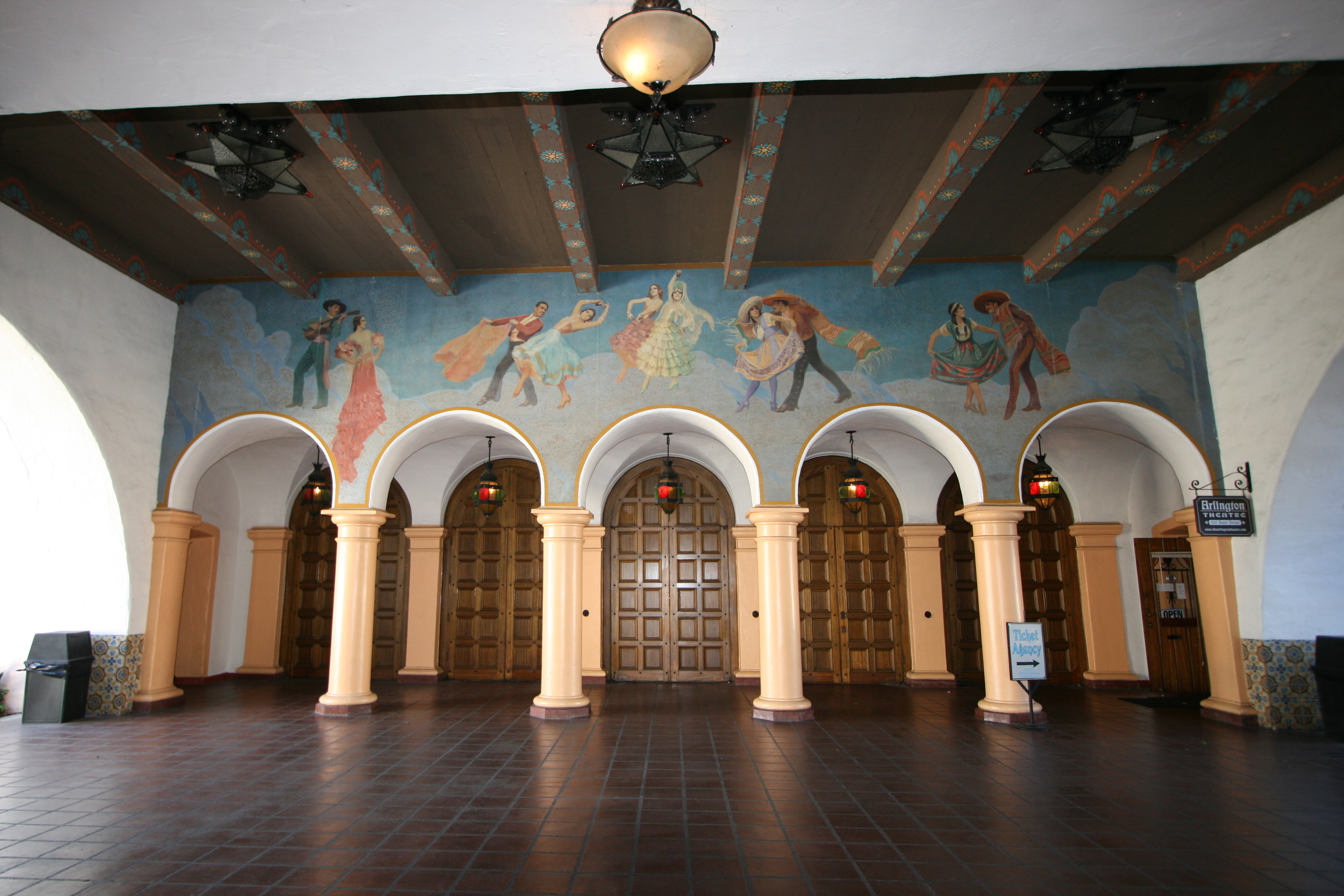
Doors into the theater

The Arlington was designed in the Mission Revival and Spanish Colonial Revival styles by the local architectural firm Edwards and Plunkett. The exterior features a Mission Revival steeple that ends in an art deco finial, a red tiled roof, and a covered courtyard with a fountain and free-standing ticket booth.

The interior is elaborately decorated. The lobby ceilings are heavily beamed and painted, and the auditorium, which seats 2,010 on its main floor and balcony, is designed to give theatergoers the impression that they are sitting in a colonial Spanish town's outdoor plaza. To create this effect, each auditorium wall features built out houses, staircases, and balconies, and the ceiling is designed to evoke the dark sky and stars.

The theater's original proscenium was formed by what appeared to be a large stone arc, through which could be seen a river and hills painted on the curtain. This effect was later removed to allow for lighting equipment for stage shows.

One of the Arlington's signature features is its 27-rank "Wonder Morton" pipe organ, made by Robert Morton originally from Loew's Jersey Theatre and one of only five built. It was restored by the theatre in 1986-88 and installed in 1988. The organ is hidden below the orchestra floor on a platform that rises into view for performances.
