= Joseph Plunkett (American football) =

American football player (1899–1975)

- Plunkett from 1948 Life magazine

Profile
- Position: Wingback

Personal information
- Born: March 23, 1899
- Died: April 28, 1975 (aged 76); Cook County, Illinois, U.S.
- Listed height: 5 ft 7 in (1.70 m)
- Listed weight: 160 lb (73 kg)

Career information
- College: none

Career history
- Chicago Cardinals (1920)

Career statistics
- Games played: 1
- Games started: 1
- Stats at Pro Football Reference

Joseph T. Plunkett (March 23, 1899 – April 28, 1975) was an American football player and Chicago politician.

Plunkett was born in 1899. He was the son of a police captain.

He played as wingback for the Chicago Cardinals in 1920. Although the claims are unverified, some sources have credited him with helping to found the National Football League (NFL) and with owning the NFL's original football club in Milwaukee.

From 1947 to 1950, Plunkett was a Democratic committeeman for the fourth ward on Chicago's south side. He was the subject of a five-page photo story in Life magazine in 1948 about the job of a "ward boss." He was deposed as ward leader, and also lost his job as deputy county clerk, in 1950 after criticizing county chairman Jacob Arvey and directing precinct captains to get votes for an attorney for crime figure Jack Guzik.

Plunkett also worked as a financial consultant. He died in Chicago in 1975.
