= Edwards and Plunkett =

American architectural firm

Practice information
- Partners: William Albert Edwards; James Joseph Plunkett; Henry Ward Howell (1926 to 1928)
- Founded: 1925
- Dissolved: 1940

Significant works and honors
- Buildings: Arlington Theatre; Janssens–Orella–Birk Building

Edwards and Plunkett was an American architectural firm active between 1925 and 1940 in Santa Barbara, California. It was founded by William Albert Edwards (1888–1976) and James Joseph Plunkett (1900–1946), who were among the most famous practitioners of the Spanish Colonial Revival style in Santa Barbara. From 1926 to 1928, Henry Ward Howell (1889–1962) was a junior partner, and they operated as Edwards, Plunkett, and Howell. Their works include the Arlington Theatre, the Janssens–Orella–Birk Building, and the original terminal building of the Santa Barbara Municipal Airport.

== History ==
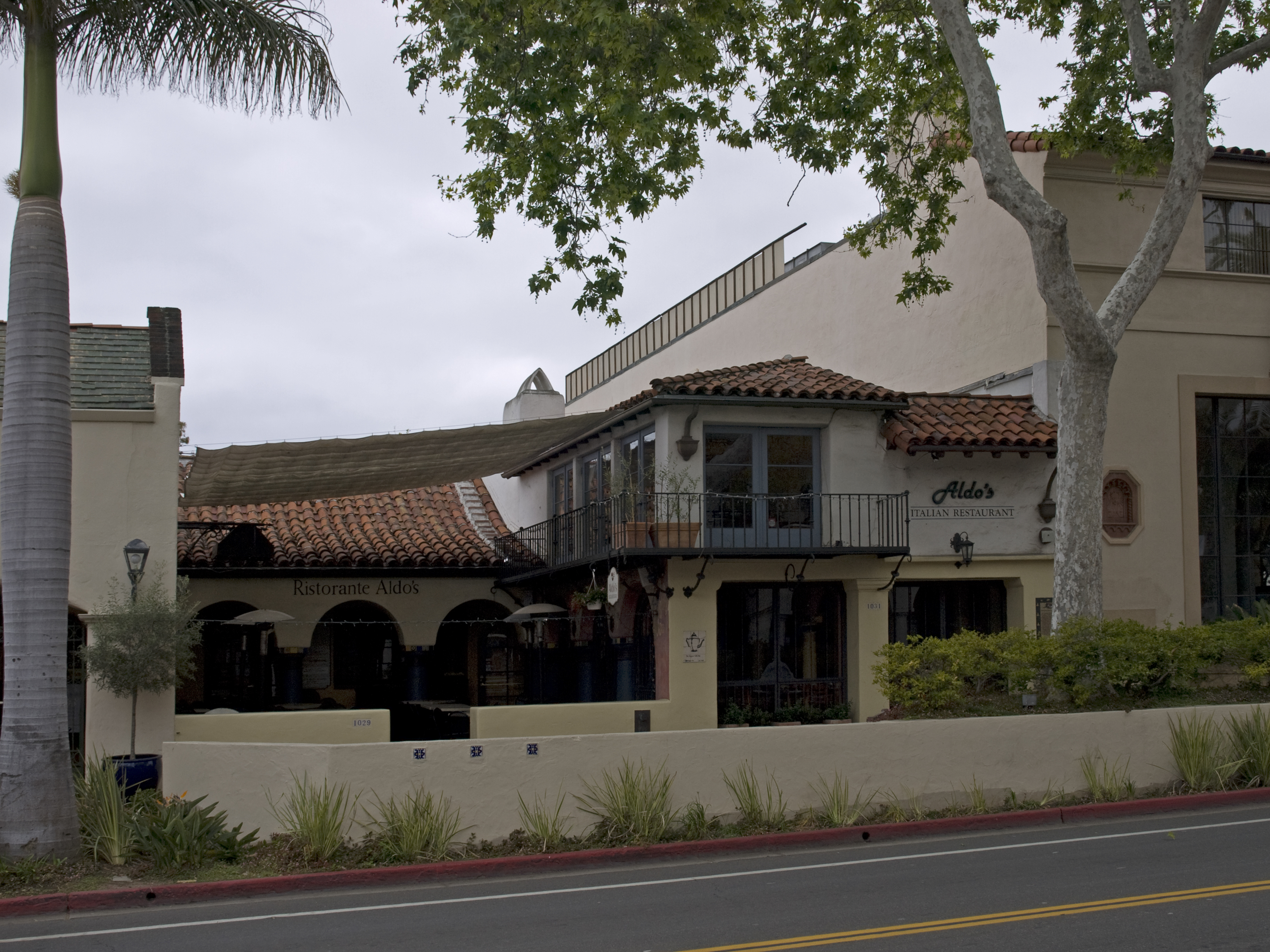
Janssens–Orella–Birk Building, 1927

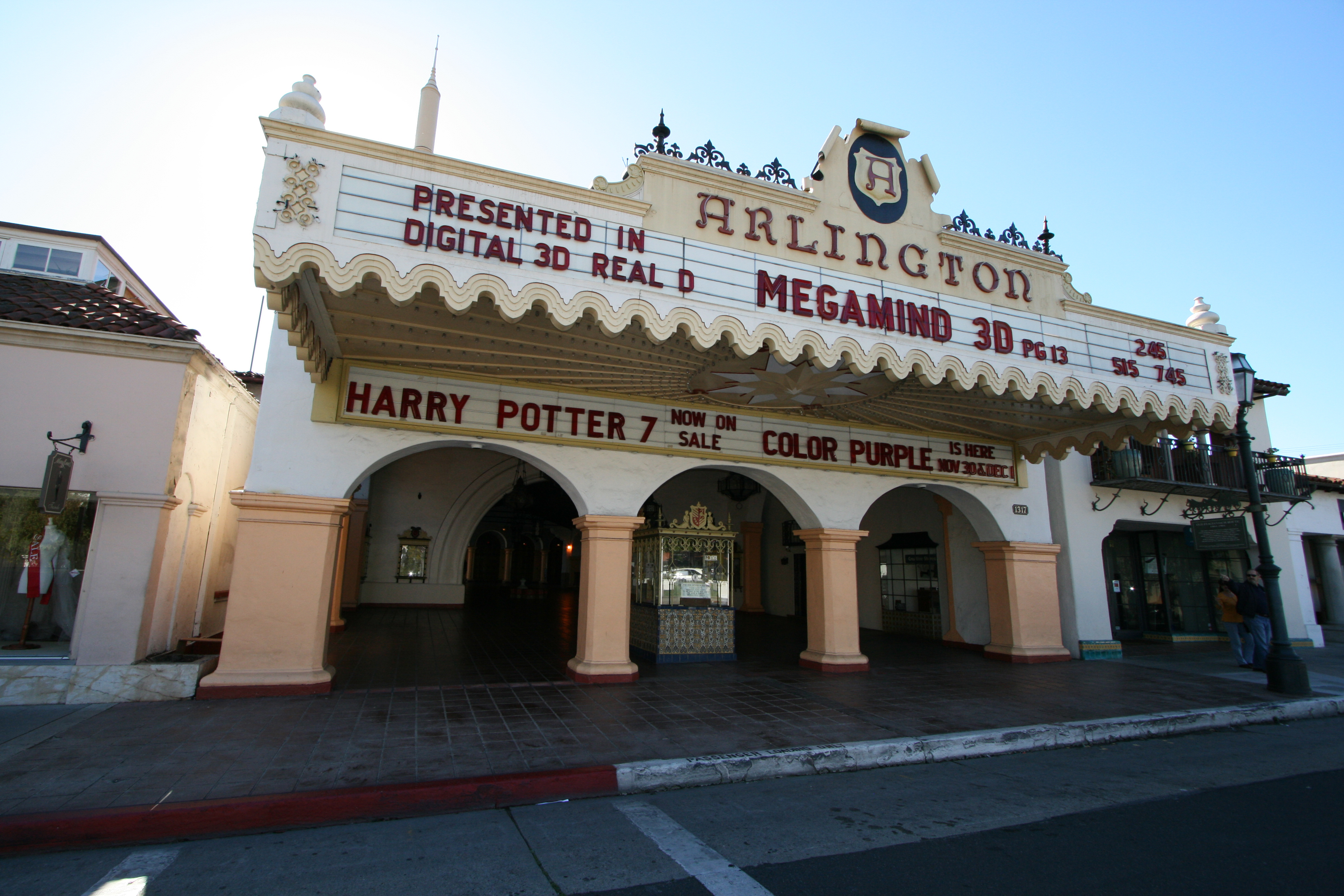
Arlington Theatre, 1931, photographed in 2010

=== Early years ===
Edwards was born in May 1888 in Santa Barbara. He attended the University of California, Berkeley, and the University of Pennsylvania, graduating with a degree in architecture in 1912, before moving back to Santa Barbara to start his own architecture firm in 1919. His early work included the Red Cross Drug Store at 828 State Street and the Morning Press Building, also on the 800 block. Both buildings were damaged in the 1925 Santa Barbara earthquake.

Plunkett, meanwhile, was born in Rome, New York, in 1900, one of 11 children. He moved to California in 1922, where he worked on the Santa Maria Inn with an architect in Santa Maria before marrying and settling in Santa Barbara to work for the Mount Diablo Building Corporation.

=== Partnership ===
On the day of the earthquake, Edwards and Plunkett obtained a permit to tour the rubble and received numerous commissions. A third designer, Henry Ward Howell (1889–1962) joined as a junior partner in 1926, before leaving the firm in 1928 to start his own practice. They were very prolific in these early years, and worked almost exclusively in the Spanish Revival style that the city was promoting at the time. Among the buildings they designed were the Medical Arts Building at 1421 Chapala Street, the Woman's Club at 670 Mission Canyon Road, and the Janssens–Orella–Birk Building.

In 1929, construction began on the Fox Arlington Theatre, arguably the firm's most significant work. It received extensive press coverage during and after its completion, in publications including the Los Angeles Times, Southwest Builder and Contractor, Motion Picture Herald, and Architectural Record. The architectural historian David Gebhard identifies its construction as one of three events, along with the completion of the Santa Barbara County Courthouse and the publication of Henry Philip Staat's Californian Architecture in Santa Barbara, that "stand forth as landmarks in [Santa Barbara's] effort to develop an 'appropriate' architecture for itself", a "culmination of the efforts of the Plans and Planning Committee of the County Arts Association to revamp Santa Barbara's image into that of a Spanish Mediterranean village."

=== Dissolution and aftermath ===
Edwards and Plunkett worked together steadily until 1940, when Edwards left for a government job up north. Plunkett continued alone, designing the El Presidio building at 802–812 Anacapa Street, which he did not live to see completed, as his final work. He died in May 1946.

Edwards returned to Santa Barbara after the war and formed the firm of Edwards and Wade in 1946, before retiring in 1950. He died in 1976. His son Peter (1924–2018) was also a Santa Barbara architect, founding his own architectural firm, Edwards–Pitman, with John Pitman in 1957.

== Legacy ==
Many of the buildings designed by Edwards and Plunkett remain standing. The Janssens-Orella-Birk Building was listed on the National Register of Historic Places in 1987, the Arlington Theatre was listed as a City of Santa Barbara Historic Landmark in 1983, and several of their buildings have been listed as Structures of Merit by the City of Santa Barbara. Their drawings are housed in the Architecture and Design Collection at the University of California, Santa Barbara.

In 2020, the celebrities Katy Perry and Orlando Bloom purchased an estate in Montecito designed by Edwards and Plunkett and renovated by Lutah Maria Riggs.

== Selected work ==
These works are listed with photographs and brief descriptions in Herb Andree and Noel Young, Santa Barbara Architecture: from Spanish Colonial to Modern, 2nd edition, pp. 116–125, unless otherwise cited. Addresses are in Santa Barbara unless otherwise listed. Buildings whose exteriors have been altered since construction date are indicated as such.

=== William A. Edwards (before 1925) ===
- Red Cross Drug Store, 828 State Street, 1925 (demolished)
- Morning Press Building, 800 block State Street, c. 1925 (demolished)
- Victoria Hotel, 22 E. Victoria Street, 1925

=== Edwards, Plunkett, and Howell (1926–1928) ===
- Medical Arts Building, 1421 Chapala Street, 1926
- Hunt Mercantile, 1025 Chapala Street, 1927
- Santa Barbara Woman's Club, 670 Mission Canyon Road, 1927 (altered)
- Copper Coffee Pot (Janssens–Orella–Birk Building), 1029 State Street, 1927 (altered)
- Commercial Building (now Wells Fargo bank), 1036 Anacapa Street, 1927 (altered), with Marston and Van Pelt
- El Centro Building, 21 E. Canon Perdido Street, 1927
- House, 2010 Grand Avenue, 1928
- Rogers House, 3626 San Remo Drive, 1927 (altered)
- House, Montecito, 1928
- House, Hope Ranch, 1928 (altered)
- Post House, Montecito, 1928 (altered)
- Santa Barbara Fire Station 3, 415 E. Sola Street, 1929 (altered)
- Arlington Theatre, 1317 State Street, 1929–31
- Salsbury Field Building, address unknown
- Johnston Cafeteria, 916 State Street (demolished)
- Standard Oil Filling Station, address unknown

=== Edwards and Plunkett (1928–1939) ===
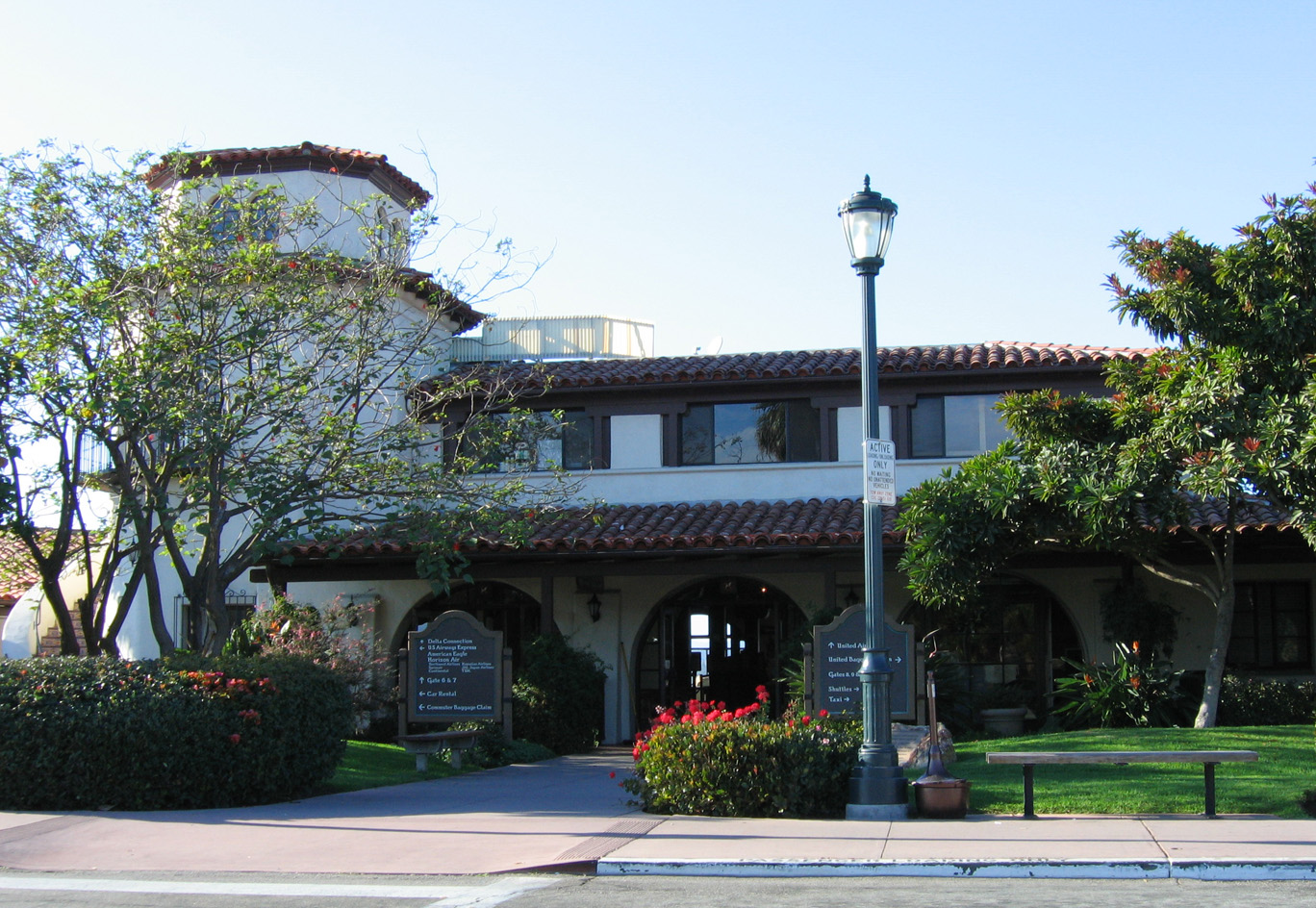
Santa Barbara Municipal Airport terminal building, 1941

- John Austin House, 405 Canon Drive, 1929
- Cold Spring School, 2243 Sycamore Canyon Road, Montecito, c. 1930 (altered)
- Apartments, 1800 El Encanto Road, c. 1930 (altered)
- House, 1806 El Encanto Road, 1930
- House, 1630 Grand Avenue, 1930
- McCormick House, Montecito, 1933
- Santa Barbara Municipal Airport Terminal Building, Sandspit Road, Goleta, 1941 (altered)
- John J. Mitchell Ranch and Residence (Rancho Juan y Lolita), 3280 Via Rancheros, Santa Ynez, c. 1930s
- National Guard Armory, 700 E. Canon Perdido Street, c. 1930s
- Clarence Mitchell House, address unknown, c. 1930s
- A. R. Demory House, Santa Barbara, c. 1930s
- E. G. Linscott House, Hope Ranch, c. 1930s

=== Joseph Plunkett (after 1939) ===
- El Presidio Building, 812-802 Anacapa Street, 1945 (altered)

== See also ==
- History of Santa Barbara, California
- Spanish Colonial Revival architecture
- George Washington Smith (architect)
- Reginald Davis Johnson
- Lutah Maria Riggs
