= The Swan Princess (film series) =

American animated film series

- Created by: Richard Rich; Brian Nissen
- Original work: The Swan Princess (1994)
- Owner: Sony Pictures Entertainment
- Years: 1994–2023

Films and television
- Film: The Swan Princess (1994)
- Direct-to-video: The Swan Princess: Escape from Castle Mountain (1997); The Swan Princess III: The Mystery of the Enchanted Treasure (1998); The Swan Princess: Christmas (2012); The Swan Princess: A Royal Family Tale (2014); The Swan Princess: Princess Tomorrow, Pirate Today! (2016); The Swan Princess: Royally Undercover (2017); The Swan Princess: A Royal Myztery (2018); The Swan Princess: Kingdom of Music (2019); The Swan Princess: A Royal Wedding (2020); The Swan Princess: A Fairytale is Born (2023); The Swan Princess: Far Longer than Forever (2023)

Audio
- Soundtrack: The Swan Princess: Music From The Motion Picture (1994)

The Swan Princess is an animated film series that began with the 1994 film The Swan Princess, loosely based on the 1877 ballet Swan Lake by Pyotr Ilyich Tchaikovsky. There are twelve films in the series.

== Films ==
Film	U.S. release date	Director	Screenwriter	Story by	Producers
The Swan Princess	November 18, 1994	Richard Rich	Brian Nissen	Richard Rich & Brian Nissen	Richard Rich & Jared F. Brown
The Swan Princess: Escape from Castle Mountain	July 18, 1997	Richard Rich	Brian Nissen	Richard Rich & Brian Nissen	Richard Rich & Jared F. Brown
The Swan Princess III: The Mystery of the Enchanted Treasure	August 7, 1998	Richard Rich	Brian Nissen	Richard Rich & Brian Nissen	Richard Rich & Jared F. Brown
The Swan Princess: Christmas	November 6, 2012	Richard Rich	Brian Nissen	Richard Rich & Brian Nissen	Richard Rich, Seldon O. Young & Jared F. Brown
The Swan Princess: A Royal Family Tale	February 28, 2014	Richard Rich	Brian Nissen	Richard Rich & Brian Nissen	Richard Rich, Seldon O. Young & Jared F. Brown
The Swan Princess: Princess Tomorrow, Pirate Today!	September 6, 2016	Richard Rich	Brian Nissen	Richard Rich & Brian Nissen	Richard Rich, Seldon O. Young & Jared F. Brown
The Swan Princess: Royally Undercover	March 28, 2017	Richard Rich	Brian Nissen	Richard Rich & Brian Nissen	Richard Rich, Seldon O. Young & Jared F. Brown
The Swan Princess: A Royal Myztery	March 27, 2018	Richard Rich	Brian Nissen	Richard Rich & Brian Nissen	Richard Rich, Seldon O. Young & Jared F. Brown
The Swan Princess: Kingdom of Music	August 9, 2019	Richard Rich	Brian Nissen	Richard Rich & Brian Nissen	Richard Rich, Seldon O. Young & Jared F. Brown
The Swan Princess: A Royal Wedding	August 7, 2020	Richard Rich	Brian Nissen	Richard Rich & Brian Nissen	Richard Rich, Seldon O. Young & Jared F. Brown
The Swan Princess: A Fairytale is Born	May 23, 2023	Richard Rich	Brian Nissen	Richard Rich & Brian Nissen	Richard Rich, Seldon O. Young & Jared F. Brown
The Swan Princess: Far Longer than Forever	September 19, 2023	Richard Rich	Brian Nissen	Richard Rich & Brian Nissen	Richard Rich, Seldon O. Young & Jared F. Brown

=== The Swan Princess (1994) ===
The Swan Princess is a 1994 American animated musical fantasy film based on the ballet Swan Lake. Starring the voices of Jack Palance, John Cleese, Steven Wright, and Sandy Duncan, the film was directed by a former Disney animation director Richard Rich, and produced by Nest Entertainment / Rich Animation Studios and with a musical score by Lex de Azevedo, who also wrote the songs with lyricist David Zippel. The story follows the relationship between Princess Odette and Prince Derek, who, pushed together by their respective parents, dislike each other as children and teenagers, but develop romantic feelings for each other as adults, get married, and are established as the future rulers of the kingdom. It was released theatrically on November 18, 1994, where it received mixed reviews from critics.

==== Soundtrack ====
The Swan Princess: Music from the Motion Picture is the soundtrack album of the first film. It contains the songs from the film written by Lex de Azevedo and David Zippel, as well as the film's score composed and conducted by Lex de Azevedo, and additional score conducted by Larry Bastian. The score was orchestrated by Lex de Azevedo, Larry Bastian, and Larry Schwartz.

"Far Longer than Forever" is the theme song for the first film The Swan Princess. The song was written by composer Lex de Azevedo and lyricist David Zippel, with production by Robbie Buchanan, and was nominated for a Golden Globe Award for Best Original Song. It is performed by Regina Belle and Jeffrey Osborne.

=== The Swan Princess: Escape from Castle Mountain (1997) ===
The Swan Princess: Escape from Castle Mountain / The Swan Princess: The Secret of the Castle is a 1997 American animated musical-fantasy film and the direct-to-video sequel to the animated film The Swan Princess. Directed by Richard Rich (who also directed the original), the film follows Derek and Odette one year after their wedding. Their anniversary celebrations are suddenly disrupted by the actions of the evil sorcerer Clavius, who wants to regain the Forbidden Arts and destroy their happiness.

=== The Swan Princess III: The Mystery of the Enchanted Treasure (1998) ===
The Swan Princess: The Mystery of the Enchanted Kingdom / The Swan Princess III: The Mystery of the Enchanted Treasure is a direct-to-video film and the third installment in The Swan Princess franchise. It was released in 1998, directed again by Richard Rich, and features the voices of Michelle Nicastro and Brian Nissen as Odette and Derek. This film follows Derek and Odette having to deal with Zelda, an evil sorceress who is seeking the Forbidden Arts and wishes to use them to destroy Odette and Derek's happiness.

=== The Swan Princess: Christmas (2012) ===
The Swan Princess: Christmas is a 2012 American animated fantasy film produced by Crest Animation Productions and Nest Family Entertainment, directed by Richard Rich, and starring the voices of Laura Bailey as Odette and Yuri Lowenthal as Derek. It is the fourth film in The Swan Princess series. The first released in 14 years, it follows the adventures of Odette and Derek celebrating their first Christmas together, while dealing with the return of an old enemy, Rothbart. While the three previous films in the series were animated using traditional 2D hand-drawn animation, The Swan Princess Christmas was the first film to be created entirely with 3D CGI animation.

=== The Swan Princess: A Royal Family Tale (2014) ===
The Swan Princess: A Royal Family Tale is a 2014 American animated fantasy film produced by Crest Animation Productions and Nest Family Entertainment, directed by Richard Rich, and starring the voices of Laura Bailey as Odette and Yuri Lowenthal as Derek. It is the fifth film in The Swan Princess series and follows Odette and Derek's adoption of a young girl named Alise, and their battle to defeat the evil Forbidden Arts. The film marks the 20th anniversary of The Swan Princess. It was released directly to DVD and Blu-ray on February 25, 2014.

=== The Swan Princess: Princess Tomorrow, Pirate Today! (2016) ===
The Swan Princess: Princess Tomorrow, Pirate Today is an American 2016 direct-to-DVD animated sequel and sees Alise on an adventure overseas. Produced by Crest Animation Productions, Nest Family Entertainment and Streetlight Productions, it was directed by Richard Rich and stars the voices of Jayden Isabel as Alise and Grant Durazzo as Lucas. It is the sixth film in The Swan Princess series and follows the adventures of Odette and Derek's daughter Alise on her first journey as a member of the royal family overseas. It was released direct-to-DVD on September 6, 2016.

=== The Swan Princess: Royally Undercover (2017) ===
The Swan Princess: Royally Undercover is a 2017 animated direct-to-DVD sequel and sees Alise and Lucas on a secret spy adventure. It is a musical comedy film produced by Crest Animation Productions and Nest Family Entertainment, directed by Richard Rich and starring the voices of Laura Bailey as Odette, Yuri Lowenthal as Derek, Jayden Isabel as Alise and Grant Durazzo as Lucas. This seventh film in The Swan Princess series was released on DVD and Digital HD on March 28, 2017.

=== The Swan Princess: A Royal Myztery (2018) ===
The Swan Princess: A Royal Myztery is a 2018 direct-to-DVD animated sequel where Odette and her friends investigate the mysterious appearance of the "Z" and learn what it signifies. It was released on March 27, 2018.

=== The Swan Princess: Kingdom of Music (2019) ===
The Swan Princess: Kingdom of Music is a 2019 direct-to-DVD animated sequel where Odette is hosting a music competition to celebrate Princess Alise's birthday. This film commemorates the 25th anniversary of The Swan Princess.

=== The Swan Princess: A Royal Wedding (2020) ===
The Swan Princess: A Royal Wedding is a 2020 direct-to-DVD animated sequel where Princess Odette and Prince Derek are going to the wedding of Princess Mei Li and her beloved Chen. But evil forces are at stake, the wedding plans are tarnished, and true love has difficult conditions.

=== The Swan Princess: A Fairytale is Born (2023) ===
The Swan Princess: A Fairytale is Born is a 2023 direct-to-DVD animated sequel where Princess Odette and Prince Derek are to be crowned the new king and queen while the former Queen Uberta reveals how her life was turned upside-down when she was crowned.

=== The Swan Princess: Far Longer than Forever (2023) ===
The Swan Princess: Far Longer than Forever is a 2023 direct-to-DVD animated sequel where Derek discovers that his father was accused of having deals with pirates forcing him and Odette to go undercover.

== Cast and characters ==
List indicators

This section includes characters who will appear or have appeared in more than two films in the series.

- An empty grey cell indicates the character was not in the film, or that the character's official presence has not yet been confirmed.
- ^{O} indicates an older version of the character.
- ^{Y} indicates a younger version of the character.
- ^{D} indicates an appearance as a character's disguised voice.
- ^{S} indicates an appearance as a character's singing voice.

Character	Films											
Character	The Swan Princess	The Swan Princess: Escape from Castle Mountain	The Swan Princess III: The Mystery of the Enchanted Treasure	The Swan Princess: Christmas	The Swan Princess: A Royal Family Tale	The Swan Princess: Princess Tomorrow, Pirate Today!	The Swan Princess: Royally Undercover	The Swan Princess: A Royal MyZtery	The Swan Princess: Kingdom of Music	The Swan Princess: A Royal Wedding	The Swan Princess: A Fairytale is Born	The Swan Princess: Far Longer than Forever
Princess Odette	Michelle Nicastro Liz Callaway^{O}^{S} Adrian Zahiri^{Y} Larisa Oleynik^{Y}^{S}	Michelle Nicastro	Michelle Nicastro	Laura Bailey Summer Eguchi^{S}	Laura Bailey Kathryn S. Hill^{S}	Laura Bailey	Laura Bailey	Nina Herzog	Nina Herzog	Nina Herzog	Nina Herzog	Nina Herzog Amy Shreeve Keeler^{S}
Prince Derek	Howard McGillin Adam Wylie^{Y} J.D. Daniels^{Y}^{S}	Douglas Sills Kenneth Cope^{S}	Brian Nissen	Yuri Lowenthal Michaelangelo^{S}	Yuri Lowenthal David Osmond^{S}	Yuri Lowenthal	Yuri Lowenthal	Yuri Lowenthal	Yuri Lowenthal	Yuri Lowenthal	Yuri Lowenthal Sagan Carter^{Y}	Yuri Lowenthal David Paul Smith^{S}
Jean-Bob	John Cleese David Zippel^{S}	Donald Sage MacKay	Donald Sage MacKay	Clayton James Mackay	Clayton James Mackay	Clayton James Mackay	Clayton James Mackay	Clayton James Mackay	Clayton James Mackay	Clayton James Mackay	Clayton James Mackay	Clayton James Mackay
Speed	Steven Wright Jonathan Hadary^{S}	Doug Stone	Doug Stone	Doug Stone	Doug Stone Joel Bishop^{S}	Doug Stone	Doug Stone	Doug Stone	Doug Stone	Doug Stone	Doug Stone	Doug Stone
Puffin	Steve Vinovich	Steve Vinovich	Steve Vinovich	Gardner Jaas	Gardner Jaas	Gardner Jaas	Gardner Jaas	Gardner Jaas	Gardner Jaas	Gardner Jaas	Gardner Jaas	Gardner Jaas
Queen Uberta	Sandy Duncan	Christy Landers	Christy Landers	Jennifer Miller	Jennifer Miller Jan Broberg^{S}	Jennifer Miller	Jennifer Miller	Jennifer Miller	Jennifer Miller	Catherine Lavin	Catherine Lavin	Catherine Lavin
Lord Rogers	Mark Harelik	Joseph Medrano	Joseph Medrano	Joseph Medrano	Joseph Medrano	Joseph Medrano	Joseph Medrano	Joseph Medrano	Joseph Medrano	Joseph Medrano	Joseph Medrano	Joseph Medrano
Bridget	Bess Hopper Michelle Nicastro^{D}	Rosie Mann	Cameo	Catherine Lavine	Catherine Lavine	Catherine Lavine	Catherine Lavine	Catherine Lavine	Catherine Lavine		Catherine Lavine	
Bromley	Joel McKinnon Miller Wes Brewer^{S}	Owen Miller	Owen Miller	Joe Ochman	Joe Ochman						Silent cameo	
Sir Chamberlain	James Arrington Davis Gaines^{S}	James Arrington	Cameo	James Arrington	Cameo	Brian Nissen	Brian Nissen	Brian Nissen	Brian Nissen		Brian Nissen	Cameo
Rothbart	Jack Palance Lex de Azevedo^{S}	Portrait	Sean Wright	Sean Wright	Flashback						Flashback	
King William	Dakin Matthews				Flashback		Portrait		Portrait		Michael Sorich	
Clavius		Jake Williamson Michael Lanning^{S}										
Knuckles		Joey Camen										
Zelda			Katja Zoch Michelle Nicastro^{D}									
Whizzer			Paul Masonson									
Peter				Doug Stone	Cameo						Chris Smith	
Ferdinand		Cameo	Paul Masonson	Brian Nissen	Brian Nissen				Brian Nissen		Brian Nissen	
Princess Alise					Carly G. Fogleson	Jayden Isabel Olivia Bateman^{S}	Jayden Isabel	Jayden Isabel	Bleau Essen		Bleau Essen	
Lucas						Grant Durazzo	Grant Durazzo	Grant Durazzo	Grant Durazzo		Grant Durazzo	
King Sebastian							Joe Ochman	Cameo	Cameo	Cameo	Joe Ochman	Joe Ochman
Number 9/Jasper							David Lodge	David Lodge				
Scully					Joseph Medrano	Joseph Medrano		Joseph Medrano	Joseph Medrano			Joseph Medrano
Niccolo							David Lodge	David Lodge				
Count Antonio							Kirk Thornton	Statue				
Prince Li									Francis Huang	Francis Huang		
Princess Mei Li									Stephanie Sheh	Stephanie Sheh		
Emperor of Cathary									George Ju	George Ju	Flashback	
Ru									Ben King	Ben King		
Fang									Lynna Yee	Lynna Yee Stephanie Sheh^{D}		
Chen									Alexandre Chen	Alexandre Chen Hao Feng^{S}		
Lord Romberg											Brian Nissen	Brian Nissen
King Maximillian											Jesse Lapierre	Jesse Lapierre
Queen Wixom											Lin Gallagher	Lin Gallagher
Queen Aubri											Mela Lee	
King Ivan											Joe Ochman	Joe Ochman
King Edgar											Kirby Garrett	Kirby Garrett
Queen Genevieve											Mela Lee	Mela Lee
King Howard											Joe Ochman	Joe Ochman
Crispin											Kirby Garrett	Kirby Garrett

== Additional crew and production details ==
Film	Crew/Detail							
Film	Composer	Songwriter(s)	End Credits title song	Art Director(s)	Editor(s)	Production companies	Distributing companies	Running time
The Swan Princess	Lex de Azevedo	David Zippel & Lex de Azevedo	"Far Longer than Forever" performed by: Regina Belle & Jeffrey Osborne "Eternity" performed by: Dreams Come True	Mike Hodgson & James Koleman	James D. Koford & Arnetta Jackson-Hamlett	Nest Family Entertainment, Rich Animation Studios	New Line Cinema	1hr 30mins
The Swan Princess: Escape from Castle Mountain	Lex de Azevedo	Lex de Azevedo & Clive Romney	"Far Longer than Forever" performed by: Michelle Nicastro & Kenneth Cope "No Fear (Rap Version)" performed by: Michelle Nicastro, Jake Williamson, Doug Stone, Donald Sage MacKay, Joey Camen, Douglas Sills, Christy Landers, Steve Vinovich, Joseph Medrano, and James Arrington	Steven E. Gordon	Joseph L. Campana & Paul Murphy	Nest Family Entertainment, Rich Animation Studios	Legacy Releasing Corporation, Warner Bros. Family Entertainment, Warner Home Video	1hr 11 mins
The Swan Princess III: The Mystery of the Enchanted Treasure	Lex de Azevedo	Lex de Azevedo & Clive Romney	"Because I Love Her" performed by: Connell Moss	Steven E. Gordon	James D. Koford & Paul Murphy	Nest Family Entertainment, Rich Animation Studios	Columbia TriStar Home Video	1hr 11mins
The Swan Princess: Christmas	Vassal Benford	Vassal Benford, Jeremy Lubbock, Clive Romney, Michaelangelo & Jared F. Brown	"Season of Love" performed by: Anna Graceman	Kyung Duk Kim & Brian Sebern	Joseph L. Campana	Stage 6 Films, Nest Entertainment Productions, Nest Family Entertainment, Crest Animation Studios, Sony Pictures Entertainment	Nest Learning, Sony Pictures Entertainment, Sony Pictures Home Entertainment	1hr 23mins
The Swan Princess: A Royal Family Tale	J Bateman	Jenny Frogley & J Bateman	"Right Where I Belong" performed by: Charice	Kyung Duk Kim	Joseph L. Campana	Sony Wonder, Nest Family Entertainment, Crest Animation Productions, Motion Makers Animation Studio Pvt. Ltd.	Sony Pictures Entertainment	1hr 19mins
The Swan Princess: Princess Tomorrow, Pirate Today!	J Bateman	J Bateman & Tyler Castleton	"I'll Be Your Star" performed by: Macy Kate	Kyung Duk Kim	Everette JBob Webber	Sony Wonder, Nest Entertainment Productions, Nest Family Entertainment, StreetLight Animation	Sony Pictures Home Entertainment	1hr 21mins
The Swan Princess: Royally Undercover	J Bateman	J Bateman & Tyler Castleton	"Born to Be Me" performed by: Macy Kate	Kyung Duk Kim	Ajit Gangawane	Sony Wonder, Nest Family Entertainment, StreetLight Animation	Sony Pictures Home Entertainment	1hr 19mins
The Swan Princess: A Royal MyZtery	J Bateman	J Bateman, Emily Pearson & Rob Moffat	"After All" performed by: Lexi Mae Walker	Kyung Duk Kim	Arvind Chaurasiya	Sony Wonder, Nest Family Entertainment, StreetLight Animation	Sony Pictures Home Entertainment	1hr 19mins
The Swan Princess: Kingdom of Music	J Bateman	J Bateman, Mike Waldvogel & Charles Mallela	—N/a	Kyung Duk Kim	Everette JBob Webber	Sony Wonder, Nest Family Entertainment, StreetLight Animation	Sony Pictures Worldwide Acquisitions	1hr 22mins
The Swan Princess: A Royal Wedding	J Bateman	J Bateman & McKay Crockett	—N/a	Kyung Duk Kim	Joseph L. Campana	Sony Wonder, Nest Family Entertainment, StreetLight Animation	Sony Pictures Worldwide Acquisitions	1hr 23mins
The Swan Princess: A Fairytale is Born	J Bateman	J Bateman & David Paul Smith	"Let The Curtain Rise" performed by: Taylor Bateman	Kyung Duk Kim	Joseph L. Campana	Sony Wonder, Nest Family Entertainment, StreetLight Animation	Sony Pictures Worldwide Acquisitions	1hr 23mins
The Swan Princess: Far Longer than Forever	J Bateman	J Bateman & David Paul Smith	"Far Longer than Forever" performed by: Bo Jacqueline & R. George Banner	Kyung Duk Kim	Joseph L. Campana	Sony Wonder, Nest Family Entertainment, StreetLight Animation	Sony Pictures Worldwide Acquisitions	1hr 23mins
