= The Swan Princess: Christmas =

- Release poster
- Directed by: Richard Rich
- Screenplay by: Brian Nissen
- Story by: Richard Rich; Brian Nissen
- Based on: Swan Lake by Pyotr Ilyich Tchaikovsky
- Produced by: Richard Rich; Seldon O. Young; Jared F. Brown
- Starring: Laura Bailey; Yuri Lowenthal; James Arrington; G.K. Bowes; Sean Wright
- Edited by: Joe Campana
- Music by: Vassal Benford
- Production companies: Stage 6 Films; Crest Animation Productions; Nest Family Entertainment
- Distributed by: Sony Pictures Home Entertainment
- Release date: November 6, 2012
- Running time: 83 minutes
- Country: United States
- Language: English

The Swan Princess: Christmas is a 2012 American animated musical fantasy family film directed by Richard Rich, produced by Crest Animation Productions and Nest Family Entertainment. It is the fourth film in The Swan Princess series, and the first in 14 years. In the film, Princess Odette and Prince Derek celebrate their first Christmas together. However, their enemy, Rothbart has returned as a ghost and plans to become mortal again by ruining the kingdom's Christmas spirit. The film takes place after the events of the first film, but before the events of the second film. While the three previous films in the series were animated using traditional 2D hand-drawn techniques, The Swan Princess Christmas was the first in the series to be created entirely with CGI animation.

Out of all of the cast members James Arrington is the only one to return from the original film and its sequels, Doug Stone reprises his role as Speed from the sequels and Sean Wright reprises his role of Rothbart from The Swan Princess III: The Mystery of the Enchanted Treasure. The film is followed by an animated direct-to-DVD entitled The Swan Princess: A Royal Family Tale released one year later.

== Plot ==
Princess Odette and Prince Derek are on their way to Queen Uberta's castle to celebrate their first Christmas together. Unbeknownst to them, the evil sorcerer Rothbart has returned and enlisted the help of a black cat named Number 9 by promising nine extra lives. Number 9 lures Derek to the cellar of Uberta's castle where he opens a chest with an R on it. When Derek leaves, Rothbart emerges from the chest as a ghost. Rothbart starts his plan to become mortal again by ruining the kingdom's Christmas spirit, the only thing more powerful than the Forbidden Arts. As a ghost, Rothbart is able to cast minor spells that cause people to act negatively. He does this until almost the entire kingdom is in disharmony.

Derek learns of Rothbart's return when wind chimes playing "Far Longer than Forever" make him visible and hold him immobile. He and Odette set up chimes around the castle, but Rothbart eventually re-enlists the help of Bridget, his former hag henchwoman. She helps remove the wind chimes for him.

As part of the Christmas festivities, Uberta and Rogers are staging musical performances. They have become aggressive and competitive with each other. Odette, who is staging her own song, invites the children to perform "Christmas is the Reason" which momentarily weakens Rothbart's power over Uberta and Rogers. Odette follows up on this by inviting Uberta and Rogers to give gifts and food to the poor. The good will breaks the spell on the whole kingdom, and Rothbart is severely weakened.

Rothbart's final chance to ruin the kingdom's Christmas spirit is to sabotage the royal Christmas tree. He sends Number 9 to steal one of the Christmas lights, which he casts a spell on that will destroy the tree. Derek learns of this plan thanks to Bridget, who has double-crossed Rothbart and traps him inside giant chimes.

Derek rushes back to the Christmas Eve party to stop the tree from being lit, but he is too late. The enchanted light bulb bursts the tree and its ornaments into flames. Rothbart becomes mortal again, takes Uberta's crown which he transforms into his own, and teleports Odette to Swan Lake.

At Swan Lake, Rothbart transforms Odette into a swan again and traps her inside a cage made of roots, just as Speed, Puffin and Jean-Bob arrive. Puffin tries to attack Rothbart, but Rothbart transforms him into a Christmas ornament. Rothbart casts a spell on the moonlight so that when it touches Odette, she will permanently transform into a swan-shaped ornament. Derek arrives to rescue Odette. Rothbart transforms into the Great Animal and overpowers Derek. Odette sings "The Season of Love" which affects Rothbart. Speed and Jean-Bob realize that the positive lyrics are weakening him. She continues to weaken him by singing. Before he can finish off Derek, the positive lyrics cause him to burst into flames, killing him. Odette changes back into a human while Puffin returns to his normal self. Derek dies from his injuries, but Odette sings again. The spirit of Christmas revives him and restores the royal Christmas tree. At the Christmas party, the kingdom puts up a new Christmas ornament on the tree that honors Derek and Odette.

== Cast ==
- Laura Bailey (credited as Elle Deets) as Princess Odette
  - Summer Eguchi as her singing voice
- Yuri Lowenthal as Prince Derek
  - Michaelangelo as his singing voice
- Jennifer Miller as Queen Uberta
- Joseph Medrano as Lord Rogers
- Sean Wright as Sir Rothbart
- David Lodge as Number 9 and Guard #1
- Catherine Lavine as Bridget and Village Woman
- James Arrington as Sir Chamberlain
- Clayton James Mackay as Jean-Bob
- Gardner Jaas as Puffin
- Doug Stone as Speed, Sir Peter, and Guard #2
- Joey Lotsko as Bromley, Servant, and Guard #3
- Brian Nissen as Ferdinand the Chef
- Maxine Blue as Wood Cutter's Wife
- G.K. Bowes as Caretaker
- Gabriela Miller as a Girl
- Catherine Parks as Maid
- Ashley Spain as a Girl
- Joseph De Tacht as a Boy

== Music ==
The film's music was composed by Vassal Benford. Two albums were released in conjunction with the film. A Christmas album, "17 Songs from The Swan Princess Christmas" was released on October 22, 2012, containing the film's Christmas songs and a few instrumental pieces from the film. A more complete soundtrack album, "The Swan Princess Christmas Soundtrack", was released on November 8, 2012, containing 34 tracks of the film's songs and instrumental pieces. Both albums contain a studio version of "Season of Love", Odette's song from the film, performed by Anna Graceman.

Soundtrack album	Christmas album	Song/track title
1	1	"Overture and Prologue"
2	2	"Jingle Bells"
3	3	"We Wish You a Merry Christmas"
4		"Royalty"
5		"Evil Schemes"
6		"Ice Leopard Chase"
7	4	"Deck the Halls"
8	5	"Hark! The Herald Angels Sing"
9	6	"Season of Love (movie version)"
10		"Princess in Love"
11		"The Theme"
12	7	"Jolly Old St Nicholas"
13		"Jean Bob"
14	8	"Angels We Have Heard on High"
15		"12 Days of Rothbart"
16	9	"Christmas Is The Reason"
17		"The Hag"
18		"Root of Perrywinkle"
19		"Cutting Down the Chimes"
20	10	"Food for the Poor"
21	11	"God Rest Ye Merry, Gentlemen"
22	12	"Joy to the World"
23	13	The Great Escape
24	14	"Away in a Manger"
25		The Great Chase
26	15	"Here We Come A-Caroling"
27		"The Countdown"
28		"Rothbart's Wrath"
29		"The Great Animal"
30		"Aliens"
31	16	"Derek's Rebirth"
32		"Epilogue"
33	17	"Christmas is The Reason (reprise)"
34	18	"Season of Love (Anna Graceman version)"

== Reception ==
Common Sense Media gave the film 2 out of 5 stars. The website reads, "Animated sequel lacks magic; some mild violence."

== See also ==
- List of Christmas films
