= The Swan Princess III: The Mystery of the Enchanted Treasure =

The Swan Princess: The Mystery of the Enchanted Treasure
- Release poster
- Directed by: Richard Rich
- Screenplay by: Brian Nissen
- Story by: Richard Rich; Brian Nissen
- Produced by: Richard Rich; Jared F. Brown
- Starring: Michelle Nicastro; Brian Nissen; Doug Stone; Steve Vinovich; Joseph Medrano; Christy Landers; Donald Sage Mackay; Paul Masonson; Katja Zoch
- Edited by: James Koford; Paul Murphy
- Music by: Lex de Azevedo
- Production companies: Nest Entertainment; Rich Animation Studios
- Distributed by: Columbia TriStar Home Video
- Release date: August 4, 1998
- Running time: 71 minutes
- Country: United States
- Language: English

The Swan Princess III: The Mystery of the Enchanted Treasure, alternatively titled The Swan Princess: The Mystery of the Enchanted Kingdom, is a 1998 American animated direct-to-video musical adventure film and the third installment in The Swan Princess franchise. It was directed again by Richard Rich, and features the voices of Michelle Nicastro and Brian Nissen as Odette and Derek. This film follows Derek and Odette having to deal with Zelda, a sorceress who is seeking the Forbidden Arts and wishes to use it to destroy their happiness.

This sequel features the returning voices of Nicastro and Steve Vinovich from the first film, which would be the last time, with the former's death in 2010, with all the other characters being re-cast. The overseas production was handled by Hanho Heung-Up, a South Korean animation studio that provided cel painting service for the original film, and also animated the first direct-to-video sequel, The Swan Princess: Escape from Castle Mountain. The film was seemingly the end of the series, until 2012, when it was followed by another direct-to-DVD sequel: The Swan Princess: Christmas, which consists of 3D computer animation.

== Plot ==
As Prince Derek and Princess Odette's kingdom prepares to celebrate Festival Days, the evil sorceress Zelda plots to reclaim Rothbart's notes on the Forbidden Arts; notes she helped write when she and Rothbart were partners. To discover if the notes still exist, Zelda captures a yakey-bird named Whizzer, who has the ability to imitate any voice after hearing it only once. Though Zelda's magical abilities are limited, she can create a magical fireball called a seeker to target anyone she commands it to. Threatening his life with this ability, Whizzer goes to Swan Lake Castle as a spy and overhears how Derek and Rogers discovered Rothbart's notes and had them hidden. Odette never knew Derek found the notes and always assumed if such things were discovered, the notes would be immediately destroyed. She tries to convince Derek to dispose of it saying how nothing good will ever come of them while Derek maintained his belief of someday using the notes for good.

After Whizzer informs Zelda, she goes to the castle pretending to be an "accordion slave". She flirts and charms Lord Rogers with a story about how she had escaped a king who kept her locked up and play the accordion constantly. Rogers falls in love with Zelda and invites her to stay at the castle, despite the reservations of Queen Uberta. That night, Zelda steals the chest with Rothbart's notes and flees. To her dismay, the last word of the "Power of Destroy" note has been torn off, preventing her from gaining full power. Zelda questions Whizzer and learns that Derek tore off the remaining portion and has it hidden.

Zelda casts a seeker to find Odette, while Whizzer is sent to deliver a ransom note to Derek. The seeker successfully brings Odette and Jean-Bob to Zelda's lair. At the castle, Derek receives the ransom note and retrieves the torn portion of the destroy notes from where he'd hidden it in the library. Whizzer is captured by Speed and Puffin, who convince him to help them stop Zelda. Whizzer eventually agrees and the group heads out to help Derek to rescue Odette.

When Jean-Bob frees Odette, she attempts to sneak off with the notes only to be caught again. Zelda then transforms Odette into a swan and imprisons her and Jean-Bob in a dome of green fire that will disintegrate anything that touches it, including its prisoners. When Derek arrives at the meeting place to pay the ransom, Zelda tricks Derek into letting his guard down by disguising herself as Odette and snatches the final piece from his grip. Zelda mocks Derek and retracts her promise of returning Odette. Instead, she plans to test the Power to Destroy on Odette.

Puffin, Speed, and Whizzer finally meet up with Derek and race toward Zelda's lair. They free Odette and Jean-Bob while Zelda is busy absorbing the Power to Destroy. Derek and the others face her in battle during the ensuing fight, Zelda conjures a destroying seeker and casts it at Odette, who flies away from the lair with Puffin in an attempt to escape. Whizzer distracts Zelda by imitating Rothbart's voice, allowing Derek to snap her wand in two. Zelda falls back onto her own barricade of green fire and is killed for good. However, Puffin returns to the lair alone and reveals that Odette was killed by the seeker. A heartbroken Derek cries for his lost love, regretting that he did not destroy the notes earlier. As he burns the notes, he apologizes to Odette and prays that some good may still come from it. The flames take on the shape of a swan, from which Odette materializes, and returns to life. Derek embraces and tells Odette he loves her.

The Kingdom is safe once more and the festival takes place as planned with Jean-Bob winning the obstacle course and becoming prince for a day (with a little outside help from Whizzer), and Uberta and Rogers winning the talent show. As Derek and Odette watch the proceedings, Odette asks Derek to promise there is no more magic in the castle. Derek replies he cannot because there will always be magic when Odette is there.

== Cast ==
- Michelle Nicastro – Odette
- Brian Nissen – Derek
- Katja Zoch – Zelda
- Joseph Medrano – Lord Rogers
- Christy Landers – Queen Uberta
- Donald Sage Mackay – Jean-Bob
- Doug Stone – Speed
- Steve Vinovich – Puffin
- Paul Masonson – Whizzer
- Owen Miller – Bromley
- Sean Wright – Sir Rothbart

== Songs ==
- "It Doesn't Get Any Better Than This" - performed by Michelle Nicastro, Brian Nissen, Christy Landers, Doug Stone, Steve Vinovich, Donald Sage MacKay, Joseph Medrano, and Owen Miller
- "Because I Love Her" - performed by Brian Nissen, lyrics by Clive Romney and Sydney Clarke
- "She's Gone!" - performed by Joseph Medrano
- "Bad Days Ahead" - performed by Katja Zoch
- "The Right Side" - performed by Steve Vinovich, Doug Stone, and Paul Masonson
- "Because I Love Her" [End Credits] - performed by Connell Moss

== Release ==
The film was originally released direct-to-video on August 4, 1998, with "It Doesn't Get Any Better Than This", "The Right Side", and "Because I Love Her" being used as three bonus sing alongs after the feature presentation. It was later released on DVD on March 30, 2004. A full double-sided widescreen set containing all three films and the sing-a-long was released on February 16, 2004, but is only available outside of the United States. An American release of a two-pack Double Feature DVD came out on August 2, 2005, containing this film and the original The Swan Princess.

== Reception ==
Common Sense Media have the film 3 out of 5 stars. The website reads, "So-so sequel recaptures some of 1st's charm and humor."
