= Crest Animation Productions =

Indian-American animation studio

- Formerly: Rich Entertainment (1986–1993); Rich Animation Studios (1993–2000); RichCrest Animation Studios (2000–2007)
- Type: Subsidiary
- Founded: March 15, 1986; 40 years ago
- Founder: Richard Rich
- Defunct: June 19, 2013; 13 years ago
- Fate: Closed
- Successors: Streetlight Animation; Splash Entertainment
- Headquarters: Burbank, California, United States
- Key people: Richard Rich
- Parent: Nest Family Entertainment (1993–2000); Crest Animation Studios (2000–2013)

Crest Animation Productions (formerly RichCrest Animation Studios, Rich Animation Studios and originally Rich Entertainment) was an Indian-American animation studio that operated from 1986 to 2013. Headquartered in Burbank, California, it was founded on March 15, 1986 by Richard Rich.

Crest's most well known work include Alpha and Omega and The Swan Princess. The studio initially made some traditional animated films, but later exclusively relied on computer animation until its closure in 2013.

== History ==
The studio was founded by film director Richard Rich in 1986, who previously worked at Walt Disney Productions. He initially had 26 employees, most of them coming from Disney such as former marketing chief Matt Mazer. Around that time, Rich was contacted by Jared F. Brown to produce half-hour animated videos based on audio cassettes of the Book of Mormon for his Living Scriptures firm. They subsequently expanded to educational animated Christian and historical videos for children through a sister company Family Entertainment Network.

In 1993, Rich Animation Studios was fully acquired by Nest Entertainment, a holding company that also combined Family Entertainment Network and Cassette Duplicators Inc., a cassette-duplicator in West Valley City. On the heels of the videos' success, the two studios produced The Swan Princess in 1994, based on the classic ballet Swan Lake. Despite being a box-office disappointment, it sold well on video and spawned two sequels, The Swan Princess: Escape from Castle Mountain and The Swan Princess: The Mystery of the Enchanted Kingdom.

In 1999, the two studios teamed up with Morgan Creek Productions and Rankin/Bass Productions to produce an animated adaptation of Rodgers and Hammerstein's The King and I for Warner Bros. However, the film bombed at the box office and received very negative reviews, which forced Nest Family Entertainment to sell off the studio to Crest Animation Studios on New Year's Day 2000. The studio was renamed to RichCrest Animation Studios, and they continued to produce Bible videos for Nest until 2005.

In February 2007, RichCrest was renamed to Crest Animation Productions and announced that it was "expanding its business to become a full-service animation studio specializing in the development and production of CGI-animated properties for theatrical, television, home entertainment and interactive distribution".

The studio was shut down in 2013, after failing to make a profit. Many of its productions contracts were handed over to other studios for completion. Norm of the North, a film that was in production at Crest before closing, along with future Alpha and Omega sequels were handed over to Splash Entertainment while future Swan Princess installments were handled by Streetlight Animation, which Rich also formed.

== Filmography ==
=== Theatrical features ===
Rich era

| Title | Release date | Notes |
|---|---|---|
| The Swan Princess | November 18, 1994 | Co-production with Nest Family Entertainment |
| The King and I | March 19, 1999 | Co-production with Morgan Creek Productions, Rankin/Bass Productions and Nest Family Entertainment |

RichCrest era

| Title | Release date | Notes |
|---|---|---|
| The Trumpet of the Swan | May 11, 2001 | Co-production with TriStar Pictures and Nest Family Entertainment |
| Muhammad: The Last Prophet | November 8, 2002 | |

Crest era

| Title | Release date | Notes |
|---|---|---|
| Alpha and Omega | September 17, 2010 | Co-production with Lionsgate Films; and produced in CGI. |

=== Direct-to-video ===
Rich era

| Title | Release date | Notes |
|---|---|---|
| Animated Stories from the Book of Mormon | 1987-1992 | Co-production with Living Scriptures |
| Animated Stories from the New Testament | 1987-2004 | Co-production with Nest Family Entertainment |
| Animated Hero Classics | 1991–1997, 2004 | Co-production with Living History Productions, Nest Family Entertainment and Warner-Nest Animation |
| Animated Stories from the Bible | 1992–1995 | Co-Production with Nest Family Entertainment |
| The Swan Princess: Escape from Castle Mountain | July 18, 1997 | |
| The Swan Princess III: The Mystery of the Enchanted Treasure | August 4, 1998 | |
| The Scarecrow | August 22, 2000 | |

RichCrest era

| Title | Release date | Notes |
|---|---|---|
| K10C: Kids' Ten Commandments | 2003 | Co-production with TLC Entertainment and SMEC Media |
| Arthur's Missing Pal (CGI) | August 22, 2006 | Co-production with WGBH-TV, Mainframe Entertainment and Marc Brown Studios |

Crest era Note: All films CGI.

| Title | Release date | Notes |
|---|---|---|
| The Little Engine That Could | March 22, 2011 | Co-production with Universal Animation Studios |
| The Swan Princess: Christmas | November 6, 2012 | Co-production with Nest Family Entertainment |
| Alpha and Omega 2: A Howl-iday Adventure | October 8, 2013 | |
| The Swan Princess: A Royal Family Tale | February 25, 2014 | Co-production with Nest Family Entertainment |
| Alpha and Omega 3: The Great Wolf Games | March 25, 2014 | |
| Alpha and Omega 4: The Legend of the Saw Tooth Cave | October 7, 2014 | |
| Alpha and Omega: Family Vacation | August 4, 2015 | |

Films originally slated for production at Crest

| Title | Release date | Notes |
|---|---|---|
| Norm of the North | January 15, 2016 | Co-produced by Splash Entertainment and Assemblage Entrainment |
| Alpha and Omega: Dino Digs | May 10, 2016 | |
| The Swan Princess: Princess Tomorrow, Pirate Today | September 6, 2016 | Co-production with Nest Family Entertainment |
| Alpha and Omega: The Big Fureeze | December 8, 2016 | |
| The Swan Princess: Royally Undercover | March 28, 2017 | Co-production with Nest Family Entertainment |
| Alpha and Omega: Journey to Bear Kingdom | May 9, 2017 | |
| The Swan Princess: A Royal Myztery | March 27, 2018 | Co-production with Nest Family Entertainment |
| The Swan Princess: Kingdom of Music | August 6, 2019 | Co-production with Nest Family Entertainment |
| The Swan Princess: A Royal Wedding | August 4, 2020 | Co-production with Nest Family Entertainment |
| The Swan Princess: A Fairytale is Born | May 23, 2023 | Co-production with Nest Family Entertainment |
| The Swan Princess: Far Longer than Forever | September 19, 2023 | Co-production with Nest Family Entertainment |
