= James Arrington =

American actor

- Born: December 17, 1948 (age 77)
- Education: Masters, Brigham Young University American Conservatory Theater
- Website: https://www.jamesarringtonproductions.com/about

James Arrington (born December 17, 1948) is an American stage actor, director, playwright and scholar. His plays are about the people and culture of the Church of Jesus Christ of Latter-day Saints (LDS Church).

== Early life and education ==
At the age of 18, he served a two-year mission in Brazil for the Church of Jesus Christ of Latter-day Saints. Arrington studied at the American Conservatory Theater in San Francisco and has a master's degree from Brigham Young University.

In 2017, he and his wife Colleen left Utah to serve a mission together in Nashville, Tennessee. Arrington is the son of LDS historian Leonard J. Arrington.

== Career ==
Arrington served twice as the department chair for the Department of Theatrical Arts for Stage and Screen and was a film and acting instructor at Utah Valley University.

Arrington's plays include one-man shows on LDS Church leaders Brigham Young, J. Golden Kimball, and Wilford Woodruff. Here's Brother Brigham, which Arrington wrote and performs, is a two-hour, two-act play in which Brigham Young reads letters, reminisces about his past, and has conversations with other people. By 2001, Arrington had performed the play almost 700 times.

He has written and produced a large number of plays around the fictional Farley family. One to four actors play up to 20 different members of the Farley family. The play is also performed by other actors, including a U.S. Army performance company in Iraq and Afghanistan. The play has spawned a book entitled, Aunt Pearl's Family Reunion Book: Personal Pointers on "How to 'Farley-Up Your Family Reunion" Reunion Book.

Arrington has also lent his voice talents to animated film productions, including The Swan Princess series as Queen Uberta's first footman, Sir Chamberlain. He also was one of the lead voice talents in the animated film "Samuel the Boy Prophet" and several other Bible-themed animated features produced by Richard Rich. He also voiced the character Frodo Baggins in the 1979 radio dramatization of The Lord of the Rings by The Mind's Eye radio company.

Arrington was awarded the 2019 Smith-Pettit Award for Outstanding Contribution to Mormon Letters.

== Works ==
- Here's Brother Brigham: The original play was written in 1976 and filmed for DVD release in 2016.
- Farley Family Reunion (1980)
- J. Golden (1982)
- Wilford Woodruff: God's Fisherman (with Tim Slover, 1987)
- Farley Family Reunion II: The Next Gyration (1993)
- The Prophet (1995)
- Trail of Dreams (with Marvin Payne and Steven Kapp Perry, 1997)
- Farley Family Xmas (1997)
- Tumuaki! Matthew Cowley of the Pacific (1997)
- The M.A.K.E.R. (2001)
- Youtahneeks (2001)
- March of the Salt Soldiers (with Mahonri Stewart, 2008)

== Filmography ==
=== Film ===
Films in which James Arrington has had a role
Year	Title	Role	Notes	Ref.
1977	Brigham	—N/a		
1983	Savage Journey	Colonel	TV movie	
1989	A More Perfect Union: America Becomes a Nation	Gouverneur Morris		
1994	The Swan Princess	Sir Chamberlain	Voice	
1997	The Swan Princess: Escape from Castle Mountain	Sir Chamberlain	Direct-to-video; Voice	
1998	The Swan Princess: Sing Along	Sir Chamberlain	Direct-to-video; Voice	
2012	The Swan Princess: Christmas	Sir Chamberlain	Direct-to-video; Voice	
2014	The Swan Princess: A Royal Family Tale		Direct-to-video; Voice	
2017	Here's Brother Brigham	Brigham Young		

=== Television ===
Television shows in which James Arrington has had a role
Year	Title	Role	Notes	Ref.
1985	Enchanted Musical Playhouse	Michael	1 episode	
1989-1991	Animated Stories from the New Testament	Dr. Zobar; Assistant; Jezreel; Officer; African Chief	Voice; 3 episodes	
1991	The Animated Book of Mormon	Erastus	Voice; 1 episode	
1993-1995	Animated Stories from the Bible	Eli; Innkeeper	Voice; 2 episodes	
