= Vinovich =

Vinovich is a surname. Notable people with the surname include:

- Bill Vinovich (born 1960), American football official and basketball referee
- Steve Vinovich (born 1945), American actor
