= Nest Family Entertainment =

American family entertainment company

- Formerly: Family Entertainment Network; Family Entertainment
- Type: Production company
- Industry: Entertainment
- Founded: July 1, 1988; 38 years ago
- Founders: Jared F. Brown, Stephen W. Griffin, Seldon O. Young
- Headquarters: Coppell, Texas, United States
- Website: nestlearning.com

Nest Family Entertainment is an American family entertainment company based in Coppell, Texas. It was formed on July 1, 1988 as Family Entertainment Network by Jared F. Brown, Stephen W. Griffin, and Seldon O. Young. The company has produced several dramatized radio series, animated films and TV series since the 1980s. Its series include (among others) the Animated Stories from the New Testament, The Swan Princess, The King and I, and The Scarecrow.

== History ==
Nest Family Entertainment started as Family Entertainment Network on July 1, 1988, which was an offshoot of the Living Scriptures company that Brown and Young had formed a decade prior. It specialized in dramatized audio cassette sets and animated direct-to-video series based on stories from the Holy Bible. On October 22, 1991, a sibling company was formed, Living History Productions, for dramatized audio cassettes and animated videos based on noted figures and principles of history.

On September 15, 1993, a single umbrella company named Nest Entertainment owned two production companies, Family Entertainment Network was renamed to Family Entertainment until 1994, and Living History Productions until 1996. They acquired Richard Rich's animation studios Rich Entertainment, responsible for producing the videos, around that time and expanded into other ventures including animated features and live-action children's series.

After Stephen W. Griffin stepped down, Atlanta businessman K. Douglas Martin took over as president of Nest Entertainment. The company self-financed the original 1994 animated feature film, The Swan Princess, with New Line Cinema distributing (now distributed by Sony Pictures). Despite performing poorly at the box office, strong video sales helped save the company from potential debt. The next year, Nest partnered with Warner Music Group to form Warner-Nest Animation, a children's entertainment outlet.

On New Year's Day 2000, Rich Animation Studios was sold to Indian animation company Crest Animation Studios and Nest Entertainment was renamed to NestFamily around the same time.

Currently, Nest Family Entertainment distributes short animated films for children's education, such as Animated Hero Classics. The intellectual property rights for The Swan Princess art, logo, and title have been transferred to Swan Princess Partners Utah LLC (DBA Swan Princess Partners). Swan Princess Partners is also owned by Jared F. Brown and Seldon O. Young, and is currently active in merchandizing The Swan Princess brand and creating more animated films with Sony Pictures and Streetlight Productions (Richard Rich's production studio).

== Productions ==
- Animated Stories from the New Testament (1987–2004)
- Animated Hero Classics (1991–2004)
- Animated Stories from the Bible (1992–1995)
- The Swan Princess (1994)
  - The Swan Princess: Escape from Castle Mountain (1997)
  - The Swan Princess III: The Mystery of the Enchanted Treasure (1998)
  - The Swan Princess: Christmas (2012)
  - The Swan Princess: A Royal Family Tale (2014)
  - The Swan Princess: Princess Tomorrow, Pirate Today (2016)
  - The Swan Princess: Royally Undercover (2017)
  - The Swan Princess: A Royal Myztery (2018)
  - The Swan Princess: Kingdom of Music (2019)
  - The Swan Princess: A Royal Wedding (2020)
  - The Swan Princess: A Fairytale is Born (2023)
  - The Swan Princess: Far Longer than Forever (2023)
- Yello Dyno's Tricky People (1998)
- The King and I (1999)
- The Scarecrow (2000)
- The Trumpet of the Swan (2001)
- K10C: Kids' Ten Commandments (2003)

== Reception ==
The Animated Stories from the New Testament received praise from some Christian groups, but was also criticized due to Nest Entertainment's founders being members of The Church of Jesus Christ of Latter-day Saints. The Anti-Defamation League also expressed concern about the portrayal of Jewish people in some of the videos. Several of the videos were later revised to remove content found objectionable by evangelical critics of Mormonism.

== See also ==
- Mormon cinema
