= The Swan Princess (soundtrack) =

The Swan Princess: Music From The Motion Picture

Soundtrack album by Various Artists
- Released: November 1, 1994
- Genre: Soundtrack
- Label: Sony Wonder
- Producer: Various Artists

Singles from The Swan Princess: Music From The Motion Picture
- 1. "Far Longer than Forever" Released: April 4, 1994

The Swan Princess: Music from the Motion Picture is the soundtrack to the animated feature The Swan Princess. It contains the songs from the film written by Lex de Azevedo and David Zippel, as well as the film's score composed and conducted by Lex de Azevedo, and additional score conducted by Larry Bastian. The score was orchestrated by Lex de Azevedo, Larry Bastian, and Larry Schwartz. The single "Far Longer than Forever" performed by Regina Belle and Jeffrey Osborne was nominated for a Golden Globe Award in 1995 for Best Original Song.

== Track listings ==
All lyrics are written by David Zippel; all music is composed by Lex de Azevedo.

No.	Title	Performer(s)	Length
1.	"Prologue" (score)	Brian Nissen	3:04
2.	"This is My Idea"	Sandy Duncan, Dakin Matthews, Howard McGillin, Liz Callaway, Adam Wylie, J.D. Daniels, Wes Brewer, Adrian Zahiri, Larisa Oleynik, Alisa Nordberg, and Steven Stewart	6:09
3.	"Practice, Practice, Practice"	Paul Ainsley, Ric Stoneback, Tom Alan Robbins, Lenny Wolpe, and Sandy Duncan	2:23
4.	"Far Longer than Forever"	Liz Callaway and Howard McGillin	2:23
5.	"No Fear"	Liz Callaway, Steve Vinovich, Jonathan Hadary, and David Zippel	3:37
6.	"No More Mr. Nice Guy"	Lex de Azevedo, Emile de Azevedo, Melissa Pace, Julie de Azevedo, Emily Pearson-Fales, and Rachel de Azevedo	2:40
7.	"Princesses on Parade"	Davis Gaines and Mark Harelik	4:09
8.	"Far Longer than Forever"	Regina Belle and Jeffrey Osborne	3:46
9.	"No More Mr. Nice Guy"	Dr. John	3:00
10.	"The Enchanted Castle" (score)		2:14
11.	"It's Not What It Seems" (score)		1:49
12.	"Derek Finds Odette" (score)		1:47
13.	"Gator-Aid" (score)		2:51
14.	"Odette Flies/Derek Gallops" (score)		1:14
15.	"End Credits" (score)		1:22
16.	"Eternity" (writers: Masato Nakamura, Miwa Yoshida, Mike Pela, and David Zippel)	Dreams Come True	4:09
Total length:			45:07

- Note, The short song sung in between the songs "Princesses On Parade" called "No Fear (Reprise)" in the film is not sung in the soundtrack version of the song.
- Note 2, A deleted song called "Forever In My Heart" what eventually became "Far Longer than Forever".
- Note 3, A deleted song called "Rothbart's Song" (also known as "Song of the Castle") what eventually became "No More Mr. Nice Guy".
- Note 4, A deleted song called "Go For It" what eventually became "No Fear".

== The Animated Classic Soundtrack track listing ==
1. "Prologue" - 3:03
2. "This Is My Idea" - 6:08
3. "Rothbart Attacks King William" - 1:31
4. "Practice, Practice, Practice" - 2:22
5. "The Enchanted Castle" - 2:12
6. "Far Longer than Forever" - 2:24
7. "Jean-Bob's Theme" - 1:01
8. "No Fear" - 3:35
9. "It's Not What It Seems" - 1:45
10. "Derek Finds Odette" - 1:44
11. "No More Mr. Nice Guy" - 2:37
12. "Princesses On Parade" - 4:04
13. "Gator-Aid" - 2:48
14. "Odette Flies/Derek Gallops" - 1:40
15. "End Credits" - 1:31
16. "Eternity" - 3:28

== Crew ==
- Original score composed and conducted by Lex de Azevedo
- Original songs: music by Lex de Azevedo; lyrics by David Zippel
- "Eternity" written by Masato Nakamura, Miwa Yoshida, Mike Pela, and David Zippel
- Executive in charge of music for New Line Cinema: Toby Emmerich
