= David Lodge (voice actor) =

American voice actor

- Occupation: Voice actor
- Years active: 1989–present
- Website: www.davidlodge.com

David Lodge is an American voice actor who works for anime as well as animation and video games, and is known for his voice work in the Power Rangers franchise. Two of his best-known voice roles there were as Villamax in Power Rangers Lost Galaxy and Loki in Power Rangers Lightspeed Rescue. In anime, he voiced Kenpachi Zaraki in Bleach and Jiraiya in Naruto. In animation, he provides the voice of Luxor in Tutenstein and Tenderheart Bear in the 2010s Care Bears cartoons. In video games, he voices a variety of roles, especially in World of Warcraft.

== Filmography ==
=== Anime ===
List of English dubbing performances in anime
Year	Title	Role	Notes	Source
1999	Digimon Adventure	Puppetmon		Resume
2000	Digimon Adventure 02	Azulongmon, Mr. Inoue		Resume
2003	Bobobo-bo Bo-bobo	Giga, Various characters		
2005–2009	Naruto	Jiraiya		Resume
2006	Paprika	Dr. Torataro Shima		Resume
2006–2012	Bleach	Kenpachi Zaraki	No longer voices after 2012	Resume
2009	Monster	Inspector Weissbach, Dr. Schumann, Yamamoto		Resume
2009–2018	Naruto: Shippuden	Jiraiya		
2018-2019	Persona 5: The Animation	False Igor, Yaldabaoth		
2020	Dragon's Dogma	Grigori	Netflix ONA	
2021	Boruto: Naruto Next Generations	Jiraiya		
2022	Ghost in the Shell: SAC_2045	Ishikawa	Replaces Michael McCarty in Season 2	
2023–2024	Mashle: Magic and Muscles	Wahlberg Baigan		Resume

=== Television ===
List of voice performances in animation and voice-over dubbing
Year	Title	Role	Notes	Source
1994	Aaahh!!! Real Monsters	Deiter, Officer Lyle, others		
1997	I Am Weasel	Doolunch	Episode: "I Are Big Star"	
2000	Harvey Birdman, Attorney at Law	Various characters		
2001	Oh Yeah! Cartoons	Dad, Paul	Episode: "Skippy Spankerton: Hot Tamale Monster Movie Madness"	
2006–2008	Tutenstein	Luxor, Set	Season 3; as Robert R. Ridgeway, replacing Daran Norris	
2006–2007	Legion of Super Heroes	Tharok, Controller, Announcer, Carnival Barker	3 episodes	
2009	Superman: Red Son	Superman	Internet motion comic	
2012	Care Bears: Welcome to Care-a-Lot	Tenderheart Bear		
2012	Family Guy	Kelsey Grammer	Episode: "Ratings Guy"	
2013	Fandango cartoon shorts	Narrator, various characters	Internet shorts made by the company	
2014–16	Team Hot Wheels	Rhett, Gammy Gram, Grog, others	Netflix series	
2015–16	Care Bears & Cousins	Tenderheart Bear	Netflix series	
2015	Goldie & Bear	Baley, Magic Gnome		
2016	Justice League Action	Calythos	Episode: "Power Outage"	
2018	The Boss Baby: Back in Business	Magnus	Episode: "Scooter Buskie"	
2024	The Loud House	Pauly	Episode: "Bye Tanya"	
TBA	Power Rangers	Loki, Villamax, many others	15 years	

=== Films ===
List of voice performances in direct-to-video and television films
Year	Title	Role	Notes	Source
2008	Kite Liberator	Akiyama		
2009	A Martian Christmas	Gleeb, Santa		
2009	Happily N'Ever After 2: Snow White—Another Bite @ the Apple	Rumpelstiltskin, Priest		
2012	The Swan Princess Christmas	Number 9, Footmen		
2014	The Swan Princess: A Royal Family Tale	The Forbidden Arts		
2014	Alpha and Omega 3: The Great Wolf Games	Nars		
2017	The Swan Princess: Royally Undercover	Nicollo, Trumbean King, Number 9, Sea Captain		
2018	The Swan Princess: A Royal Myztery	Nicollo, Number 9		
2020	Bigfoot Family	Arlo Woodstock		
2022	Trick or Treat Scooby-Doo!	Warden Collins, Harry, Inspector		
2023	Justice League: Warworld	Sheriff		
2024	Digimon Adventure	Parrotmon		
2024	Digimon Adventure: Our War Game!	Male Elderly Neighbor 2B		

List of voice performances in feature films
Year	Title	Role	Notes	Source
2000	Digimon: The Movie	Parrotmon		
2013	The Starving Games	Announcer		Resume
2026	Swapped	Wolf Father		

=== Video games ===
List of voice performances in video games
Year	Title	Role	Notes	Source
1995	The Dig	Ken Borden		
2002	Command & Conquer: Renegade	General Adam Locke		
2002	Ty the Tasmanian Tiger	Neddy the Bully		
2005	Rave Master	Rear Admiral		
2006	Dirge of Cerberus: Final Fantasy VII	Additional voices		
2006–12	Naruto games	Jiraiya		
2007	Rogue Galaxy	Valkog Drazer		
2007	World of Warcraft	General Nazgrim, Archimonde, various voices	Over 156 misc. characters	Resume
2007	Power Rangers Super Legends	Choobo, Moltor		
2008	Lost Odyssey	Kakanas		
2009	Call of Duty: Modern Warfare 2	Task Force 141 Soldier #1, Shadow Company Soldier #3, Ranger #4		
2010	Sengoku Basara: Samurai Heroes	Amago Haruhisa, additional voices (warriors)		
2011	Mortal Kombat 9	Kabal		
2011–16	Skylanders series	Chop Chop	Co-voicing with Steve Blum around Giants	
2012	NeverDead	Bryce Boltzmann		
2012	Starhawk	Rifter		
2012	MIB: Alien Crisis	Nakkadan Alien, Security Chief Greene, Adorian Alien		
2012	Dragon's Dogma	Grigori (The Dragon)		
2012	Resident Evil 6	National Security Advisor Derek Simmons		
2013	Sly Cooper: Thieves in Time	Toothpick, Boar Guard		
2013	Pac-Man and the Ghostly Adventures	Sir Cumference		In-game credits
2013	Madagascar 3: Europe's Most Wanted	Animal Control Officers, Italian Citizens		
2013	Final Fantasy XIV: A Realm Reborn	Louisoix Leveilleur		
2014	Unearthed: Trail of Ibn Battuta	Rasheed Al Kalabi, others	Other roles credited as English Voiceover Cast	
2014	D4: Dark Dreams Don't Die	Forrest Kaysen		
2014	Pac-Man and the Ghostly Adventures 2	Butt-ler, Sir Cumference		
2015	Lego Dimensions	John "Hannibal" Smith, "Fannibal"		
2016	Mobius Final Fantasy	Voyd/Cid		
2016	Killing Floor 2	Lockheart		
2016	Final Fantasy XV	Wedge Kincaid, Vyv Dorden, Bahamut, additional voices		
2017	Persona 5	False Igor, Yaldabaoth		
2018	Detective Pikachu	Mike Baker		
2018	Lego DC Super-Villains	Eclipso		
2019	Anthem	Yarrow		
2019	Rage 2	Abadon Mutants		
2019	Fire Emblem: Three Houses	Jeralt, Narrator		
2019	Elder Scrolls Online	Nahfahlaar, General Renmus		
2019	Remnant: From the Ashes	Rigs		
2020	Persona 5 Royal	False Igor, Yaldabaoth		
2020	Deadly Premonition 2: A Blessing in Disguise	P.J. Clarkson		
2021	Shin Megami Tensei III: Nocturne HD Remaster	Minister		
2021	Back 4 Blood	Quartermaster		
2021	Demon Slayer: Kimetsu no Yaiba – The Hinokami Chronicles	Additional voices		
2022	Fire Emblem Warriors: Three Hopes	Jeralt, narrator		
2022	Ghostbusters: Spirits Unleashed	Ghosts		
2022	River City Girls 2	Sabu, Tengu		
2023	Diablo IV	Astaroth		
2023	The Legend of Heroes: Trails into Reverie	Joey, Otto, Heiyue Members		
2023	Spider-Man 2	Security Guard		
2025	Dynasty Warriors: Origins	Cheng Pu		
