= G. K. Bowes =

American voice actress

G.K. Bowes
- Born: Gina Keali'inohomoku Bowes; December 12
- Other name: Gina K. Bowes
- Occupation: Voice actress
- Years active: 2008–present

Gina Keali'inohomoku Bowes (born December 12) is an American voice actress known for playing Senna in the anime film Bleach: Memories of Nobody. She had other roles, including Kiyal Bachika in Gurren Lagann, Little Red Riding Hood and Little Bo Peep in Happily N'Ever After 2: Snow White Another Bite @ the Apple, Asuka Kazama in Street Fighter X Tekken, and Daria, Freida and Fran in Alpha and Omega 4: The Legend of the Saw Tooth Cave.

== Personal life ==
Bowes identifies as being Polynesian, but has given varying accounts of her ancestry. In a 2016 interview, she said she was French Polynesian, Middle Eastern, Native American, and Cuban descent. In 2017, she mentioned that her ancestry is Tahitian and Malaysian with no African-American roots. In 2022, she said she was partial Egyptian, Native Hawaiian, and Native American (Potawatomi and Navajo) heritage.

== Filmography ==
=== Anime ===
- Aggretsuko - Gori, Tsunoda
- Berserk - Charlotte
- Buso Renkin – Saori Kawai, Victoria
- Diary of Our Days at the Breakwater – Natsumi Hodaka, Hina's Mom
- Durarara!!×2 – Mairu Orihara
- Gen:Lock - Driana Chase
- Ghost Slayers Ayashi – Shinzo (Ep. 13), Woman (Ep. 14)
- Gurren Lagann – Kiyal Bachika
- I's – College Girl C
- King's Raid: Successors of the Will – Arlette
- Marvel Anime: Blade – Lupit (Ep. 5)
- Sailor Moon – Higure Akiyama (Ep. 16; Viz dub)
- Tweeny Witches – N

=== Animation ===
Year	Title	Role	Notes
2009–2011	Special Agent Oso	Various voices	9 episodes
2012	Phineas and Ferb	Additional voices	2 episodes
2013	Sofia the First	Lin-Lin, Anya, additional voices	2 episodes
2016–2019	Doc McStuffins	Melinda, Mother Lion	3 episodes
2019	Love, Death & Robots	Beth	Episode: "Suits"
2019	The Lion Guard	Sasem	Episode: "Poa the Destroyer"
2022	Young Justice	Jovita, Elaine Jackson	Episode: "Beyond the Grip of the Gods!"
2022	Spirit Rangers	Various voices	2 episodes

=== Film ===
Year	Title	Role	Notes
2006	Bleach: Memories of Nobody	Senna	
2009	Happily N'Ever After 2: Snow White—Another Bite @ the Apple	Little Red Riding Hood, Bo Peep	
2012	Delhi Safari	Reporter	English dub
2012	Golden Winter	Tinkle, Mother Dog	
2012	The Swan Princess: Christmas	Caretaker	
2012–2013	Berserk: The Golden Age Arc	Charlotte	
2014	Alpha and Omega 4: The Legend of the Saw Tooth Cave	Daria, Frieda, Fran	
2015	Flash Gordon Classic	Dale Arden	
2015	Alpha and Omega: Family Vacation	Fran, Frieda	
2015	Top Cat Begins	Flight Attendant	
2016	Norm of the North	Tourist	
2016	Throne of Elves	Elf Captain	English dub
2017	Alpha and Omega 8: Journey to Bear Kingdom	Princess Canue, Magpie	
2021	Monster Hunter: Legends of the Guild	Nadia	

=== Video games ===
Year	Title	Role	Notes
2008	Saints Row 2	Female voice 2	
2009	Resident Evil 5	Majini	
2011	Marvel vs. Capcom 3: Fate of Two Worlds	Felicia	
2011	Rune Factory: Tides of Destiny	Lily, Sierra	
2012	Street Fighter X Tekken	Asuka Kazama	
2012	Guild Wars 2	HannahHannah	
2013	Disney Princess Palace Pets	Teacup	
2015	Metal Gear Solid V: The Phantom Pain	Diamond Dog Soldier	
2015	Minecraft: Story Mode	Maya, Ivy, Fangirl	
2015	Rodea the Sky Soldier		
2016	Street Fighter V	Laura Matsuda	
2016	Dying Light: The Following	Ezgi	
2017	Fire Emblem Heroes	Erinys	
2018	Fallout 76: Wild Appalachia	Christina Bryan, Clara Song	
2019	Teppen	Ruiner Felicia	
2020	Guardian Tales	Rie	
2020	The Walking Dead: Onslaught	Michonne Hawthorne	
2021	Cookie Run: Kingdom	Moonlight Cookie	
2021	Back 4 Blood	Sharice	Tunnels of Terror DLC
2022	Relayer	Additional voices	
2024	Final Fantasy VII Rebirth	Rhonda	
