= Adventures in Voice Acting =

- DVD cover
- Directed by: Eric P. Sherman
- Produced by: Kristi Reed
- Edited by: Katie Esposito
- Production company: Bang Zoom! Entertainment
- Release date: July 3, 2008 (United States DVD)
- Running time: 90 minutes
- Country: United States
- Language: English

Adventures in Voice Acting is a 2008 documentary DVD produced by Bang Zoom! Entertainment, featuring interviews from actors and crew members on the craft of voice acting. It was initially released as a set of DVDs, and has since been adapted into workshops and classes around the U.S.

== Summary ==
Adventures in Voice Acting contains interviews up to 100 voice actors, producers, and casting directors that are in anime dubs and video games. The DVD was released on July 3, 2008, after first of three volumes were released at Anime Expo. It took three years to complete, from concept to release, and was created by Bang Zoom to answer many questions they received from people wanted to know how to become a voice actor. Each episode is introduced by the animated character Mr. Mic, which was designed specifically for the documentary.

== Featured voice actors ==
Voice actors interviewed in this DVD are:

- Laura Bailey
- Christopher Bevins
- Beau Billingslea
- David Neil Black
- Steve Blum
- Johnny Yong Bosch
- Joey Camen
- Louise Chamis
- Luci Christian
- Colleen Clinkenbeard
- Justin Cook
- Mari Devon
- Dorothy Elias-Fahn
- Richard Epcar
- Doug Erholtz
- Lynn Fischer
- Michael Forest
- Rebecca Forstadt
- Sandy Fox
- Crispin Freeman
- Barbara Goodson
- Darrel Guilbeau
- Wayne Grayson
- Kyle Hebert
- Lance Henriksen
- Kate Higgins
- Megan Hollingshead
- Xanthe Huynh
- Tom Kenny
- Steve Kramer
- Lauren Landa
- Lex Lang
- Mela Lee
- Wendee Lee
- Yuri Lowenthal
- Julie Maddalena
- Dave Mallow
- Mona Marshall
- Michael McConnohie
- Mike McFarland
- Mary Elizabeth McGlynn
- Vic Mignogna
- Marin Miller
- Liam O'Brien
- Joe Ochman
- Tony Oliver
- Lisa Ortiz
- Scott Page-Pagter
- Bob Papenbrook
- Debora Rabbai
- Sam Riegel
- Cindy Robinson
- Michelle Rodriguez
- Michelle Ruff
- Paul St. Peter
- Philece Sampler
- Carrie Savage
- Steve Schatzberg
- Stephanie Sheh
- Michael Sinterniklaas
- Christopher Corey Smith
- Melodee Spevack
- Steve Staley
- Doug Stone
- Terrence Stone
- Karen Strassman
- Kim Strauss
- Eric Stuart
- Julie Ann Taylor
- Veronica Taylor
- Marc Thompson
- Kirk Thornton
- Cristina Vee
- Colleen Villard
- Kari Wahlgren
- Ezra Weisz
- Tom Wyner

Voice actors featured in sample clips, except:

- Todd Haberkorn as Kimihiro Watanuki in xxxHOLiC
- Keith Ferguson as Bloo in Foster's Home for Imaginary Friends
- Phil LaMarr as Wilt in Foster's Home for Imaginary Friends

== Casting directors and producers ==
Producers and casting directors interviewed are:

- Sean Akins
- Jason DeMarco
- Jack Fletcher
- Norman J. Grossfeld
- Sean Molyneaux
- John O'Donnell
- Kaeko Sakamoto
- Kevin Seymour

== Workshops ==
Since the release of the video documentary, Bang Zoom has provided multi-day workshops for prospective voice actors. They are taught by some of the industry veterans such as Tony Oliver, Crispin Freeman, Ruth Lambert, and Lex Lang, and some have been taught at various locales around the United States. Some of Bang Zoom's current voice actors / members have been participants in the program, including: Marin Miller, Lauren Landa, and Cristina Vee.
