= Steve Stark =

American television producer

- Born: Fort Dodge, Iowa, U.S.
- Education: Northwestern University
- Occupations: Television producer, Studio Executive
- Years active: 1983–present
- Spouse: Michelle Nicastro (m. 1986; died 2010)
- Children: 2

Steve Stark is a television producer and studio executive. He currently is the Chairman & Executive Producer for Toluca Pictures.

== Early life ==
Steve grew up in Fort Dodge, Iowa and attended Northwestern University where he graduated with a bachelor's degree in Television & Film and moved the next day to Los Angeles.

== Career ==
Over his career, Steve Stark has served in senior development & current positions at three major studios (Paramount, Columbia TriStar & Metro-Goldwyn-Mayer) as well as an Executive Producer of many series for Universal Television, Paramount Television and 20th Century Fox Television. During his career, Stark has been responsible for developing, overseeing and/or producing over 3300 episodes of television. More recently, he quit MGM/UA. Under a first look deal with MGM/UA, he has launched Toluca Pictures where he is producing several shows including The Handmaid's Tale (Hulu), Fargo (FX), Vikings: Valhalla (Netflix) The Consultant(Amazon) and Wednesday (Netflix).

As President of MGM/UA Television, he was responsible for all scripted content, from concept to production; partnerships with multi-platform broadcasters including network, cable and digital outlets; and development of new productions, including reinvigorating the MGM film library. MGM/UA Television has numerous scripted series on-air or in production including Get Shorty (EPIX), Condor (AT&T Audience Network), Perpetual Grace, LTD (EPIX), and Four Weddings and a Funeral (Hulu).

From November 2011 to March 2021, Stark oversaw the development of new content for MGM Television, creating scripted television.

Stark joined Metro-Goldwyn-Mayer from his own production company, Steve Stark Productions, where he led the company to an overall deal with NBC/Universal Television. At the helm of Steve Stark Productions, he served as Executive Producer on USA Network’s series Fairly Legal, in partnership with Universal Cable Productions, and the NBC series The Event, in partnership with Universal Television. His credits also include Executive Producer on CBS’ long-running series Medium, starring Patricia Arquette. Prior to forming his own company, Stark developed Medium while serving as President of Grammnet Productions where he also executive produced three seasons of The CW’s The Game and the U.S. adaptation of The Sketch Show for FBC.

Stark had previously held the position of executive vice president of development at Columbia Tri-Star Network Television, overseeing the development of drama, comedy and alternative programming where he developed Hack for CBS and Everwood for The WB. He had also served as Senior Vice President, Current Programming at Paramount Network Television, where he shepherded multiple episodes of series beginning with the last season of Cheers that was followed by Frasier, JAG, Becker, Nash Bridges, Girlfriends, Duckman, Star Trek: Deep Space Nine; Star Trek: Voyager, Soul Food, Wings, Brooklyn Bridge, Seven Days, Clueless, The Untouchables, Now and Again and Sister, Sister, among many others.

Prior to his run at Paramount, he worked with as a producer and development executive for Al Burton Productions at Universal Studios where he wrote and produced The New Lassie series and served as a Production Consultant on the syndicated hit Charles in Charge.

Beginning his career while still in college at Northwestern University, Stark worked with Executive Producer Bob Banner to develop and launch the long-running series Star Search that ran for 12 years and launched the careers of many successful and notable artists.

Stark's series that he has overseen or produced have garnered multiple Peabodys, Emmys, Golden Globes, SAG, DGA, WGA, AFI, BANFF and Rose d'Or wins. Stark is the recipient of the Entertainment Industries Council Special Commendation, 2 AFI Television Awards, a Genesis Award, The Prism Award, The Golden Reel Award and received the Help Group Humanitarian of the Year Award in 2019. He is a member of the Producers Guild of America, Writers Guild of America, the Television Academy and a graduate of Northwestern University.

He began his behind-the-camera career as an acting/comedy casting director on Star Search in 1983. As an actor, he co-starred as Huckleberry Finn in the 1979 television film Mark Twain: Beneath the Laughter.

== Personal life ==
For twenty-four years, Stark was married to actress Michelle Nicastro, until her death of breast cancer and brain cancer in 2010. He has two daughters, Callie and Cady.
