= Crest Animation Studios =

Indian animation studio

Crest Animation Studios, Ltd.
- Type: Public
- Traded as: BSE: 526785; NSE: CRESTANI
- Founded: 1990; 36 years ago
- Founder: Shyam Raja Ramanna
- Defunct: 2015; 11 years ago
- Headquarters: Mumbai, India
- Number of employees: 500 (2001)

Crest Animation Studios Ltd. (formerly Crest Communications) was an Indian animation studio. It was founded by Shyam Raja Ramanna in 1990 under the name Crest Communications, and it first went public in 1995. On New Year's Day 2000, it acquired Rich Animation Studios in the United States after the failure of The King and I.

In 2001, it had over 500 employees; however, it had three years of losses during which it laid off all but 110 employees. In 2004, it posted a profit and hired an additional 260 animators, and in October 2004 renamed itself to its current name. The former CEO is A.K.Madhavan. In 2010, the company released an animated feature film in conjunction with Lionsgate called Alpha and Omega in both 2D and 3D.

They are also a dubbing studio as they dubbed many cartoons for Cartoon Network. They were also responsible for dubbing the first four seasons of the Pokémon anime series into Hindi, by using the English adaptation dubbed version as their basis to create their own Hindi dub for Cartoon Network. Sound & Vision India has later followed suit when they dubbed the later seasons up towards Black and White before The Walt Disney Company India brought the rights to the series in the start of 2014 and had UTV Software Communications re-dubbed the series in-house for Hungama TV.

== See also ==
- Crest Animation Productions
