= Steve Vinovich =

American actor

- Born: January 22, 1945 (age 81); Peoria, Illinois, U.S.
- Occupation: Actor
- Years active: 1969–present
- Spouse: Carolyn Mignini

Steve Vinovich (born January 22, 1945) is an American actor.

== Biography ==
Vinovich was born on January 22, 1945, in Peoria, Illinois.

Vinovich has appeared in several feature films such as B.J Wert in 1987's Mannequin, and Dr. Novos in the 1994 comedy The Santa Clause. He also voiced Puffin in the 1994 animated film The Swan Princess and one of the only three actors of the original cast to reprise his role for the two direct-to-video sequels (the other two being Michelle Nicastro as Princess Odette and James Arrington as Sir Chamberlain).

He appeared in The Foreigner at Corn Stock Theatre in Peoria, Illinois the summer of 2013 and has appeared in Broadway shows including Waitress, All The Way, Lost in Yonkers, The Grand Tour and The Robber Bridegroom.

He is married to actress Carolyn Mignini.

== Filmography ==
Year	Title	Role	Notes
1970	Weekend with the Babysitter	Snitch	
1971	Jennifer on My Mind	Ornstein	
1972	Call Her Mom	Randall Feigelbaum	ABC Movie of the Week
1972	The Mechanic	Party Guest #1	
1972	The Sexpert	Brain Surgeon	Uncredited
1980	Three's Company	Ben Baxter	Episode: "Jack's Graduation"
1986	Seize the Day	Zeigler	
1986	Cheers	High Sultan	Episode: "Knights of the Scimitar"
1987	Mannequin	B.J. Wert	
1988	Roseanne	Bob	Episode: "The Memory Game"
1988	Raising Miranda	Bob Hoodenpyle	Regular cast, 9 episodes
1988–1990	Valerie	Richard	TV series, 4 episodes
1989	Wired	Studio Executive	
1990–1995	Family Matters	Simon Kincaid / Master of Ceremonies	TV series, 2 episodes
1990	Matlock	A.D.A. Eli Boward	Episode: "The D.A."
1990	Hollywood Boulevard II	Max Miranda	
1990	Awakenings	Ray	
1991	Guilty as Charged	Slumlord	
1991–1993	Sisters	Rupert Coates	TV series, 4 episodes
1991–1994	Step by Step	Leo Klemke / Mel Fensky	TV series, 2 episodes
1992	House IV	Yardsale Man	
1992	Round Trip to Heaven	Melvin	
1992	Married... with Children	Director	TV Series, 1 episode
1994	I'll Do Anything	Rainbow House Director	
1994	Star Trek: Deep Space Nine	Joseph	Episode: "Paradise"
1994	The Swan Princess	Puffin	Voice
1994	The Santa Clause	Dr. Pete Novos	
1995–2001	Touched by an Angel	Dave / Roger / Ron Walker	TV series, 3 episodes
1997–2007	The Young and the Restless	Senator Carter Bodi	TV series, 5 episodes
1997	The Swan Princess: Escape from Castle Mountain	Puffin	
1998	The Swan Princess: The Mystery of the Enchanted Kingdom	Puffin	
1999	Home Improvement	Dr. Hennessy	Episode: "Trouble-a-Bruin"
1999	Seven Girlfriends	Lisa's Husband	
2000	Across the Line	Mr. Randall	
2000	JAG	Mr. Berlin	Episode: "Legacy: Part 2"
2001	The Trumpet of the Swan	Maurice / Ranger	Voice
2001	Surviving Gilligan's Island	Jim Backus	TV movie
2001	Command & Conquer: Yuri's Revenge		Video game, Voice
2002–2008	Days of Our Lives	Frederick Sykes / Ben Thompson aka Frederick Skyes / Mr. Limberg	TV series, 7 episodes
2003	Everybody Loves Raymond	Jerry Musso	Episode: "Somebody Hates Raymond"
2003	8 Simple Rules for Dating My Teenage Daughter	Director	Episode: "Merry Christmas: The Story of Anne Frank and Skeevy"
2005–2006	Malcolm in the Middle	Mr. Hodges / Principal	TV series, 3 episodes
2006	Cold Case	McDuff - 1945	Episode: "The Hen House"
2008	Remarkable Power	Bill	
2010	Alpha and Omega	Park Ranger	Voice
2015	The Intern	Miles	
