= Far Longer than Forever =

Single by Regina Belle and Jeffrey Osborne

from the album The Swan Princess: Music From The Motion Picture
- Released: April 4, 1994
- Recorded: 1994
- Genre: Pop, R&B, Soul
- Length: 3:43
- Label: Sony Wonder
- Composer: Lex de Azevedo
- Lyricist: David Zippel
- Producer: Robbie Buchanan

"Far Longer than Forever" is the theme song from the animated movie The Swan Princess. The song was written by composer Lex de Azevedo and lyricist David Zippel, with production by Robbie Buchanan. The song is performed by Regina Belle and Jeffrey Osborne.

It was nominated for a Golden Globe in 1995 for Best Original Song, but lost to "Can You Feel The Love Tonight" by Elton John and Tim Rice from Disney's The Lion King.

== Production ==
The Dreams Come True song "Eternity" was used as the B-side for this song.

== Personnel ==
- Regina Belle - vocals
- Jeffrey Osborne - vocals
- Lex de Azevedo – composer
- David Zippel – lyricist
- Robbie Buchanan - producer, arranger, keyboards, synth, bass, drum programming
- Michael Thompson - guitar

== Critical reception ==
A writer for The New York Times noted, "The melody of 'Far Longer Than Forever'...echoes the first five notes of Beauty and the Beast. The Animated Movie Guide said the song had a theme of faith. This commercial single was jointly released by Sony Wonder and Sony 550 Music. MusicHound Soundtracks: The Essential Album Guide to Film, Television and Stage Music called the "seemingly mandatory big ballad" as "extremely annoying" due to "strik[ing] a totally different artistic note" in the context of the film's musical landscape. The Motion Picture Guide 1995 Annual: The Films of 1994 said the song was deserving of the Golden Globe. Star-News deemed the song "insistent" noting that audiences may "quickly get [their] fill" of the tune

== Context ==
It is sung within the context of the film as a love song, and again performed over the credits as an RnB ballad by Regina Belle and Jeffrey Osborne. In the 1994 animated film, the song was performed by vocalists, Liz Callaway, as the singing voice of Princess Odette, and Howard McGillin, as the speaking and singing voice of Prince Derek. In the closing credits, a popular rendition of the song was performed by renowned R&B recording artists, Regina Belle and Jeffrey Osborne. Michelle Nicastro and Kenneth Cope sing a reprise of the song in the 1997 sequel The Swan Princess: Escape from Castle Mountain.

The lyrics of the song revolve around the bond between two lovers who, although they are far apart, have faith that their love would eventually draw them together once again. In the film version, Princess Odette and Prince Derek are pledging their eternal love for each other, despite the fact that distance and circumstances separate them. However, they truly believe that their love shared could overcome any barrier.
