= Happily N'Ever After 2: Snow White—Another Bite @ the Apple =

2009 animated film by Steven E. Gordon and Boyd Kirkland

- DVD cover
- Directed by: Steven E. Gordon; Boyd Kirkland
- Written by: Chris Denk
- Produced by: Loris Kramer Lunsford; Jason Netter; Susan Norkin
- Starring: Helen Niedwick; Cam Clarke; Jim Sullivan; Kirk Thornton; Cindy Robinson; David Lodge; Catherine Lavin
- Edited by: Ben Edwards
- Music by: Paul Buckley
- Production companies: Kickstart Productions; Berlin Animation Film
- Distributed by: Lionsgate Home Entertainment
- Release dates: February 17, 2009 (Australia); March 24, 2009 (United States)
- Running time: 75 minutes
- Countries: United States; Germany
- Languages: English; German

Happily N'Ever After 2: Snow White—Another Bite @ the Apple is a 2009 animated direct-to-video fantasy film and the sequel to Happily N'Ever After (2006). The film features the voices of Helen Niedwick, Cam Clarke, Jim Sullivan, Kirk Thornton, Cindy Robinson, David Lodge and Catherine Lavin. Mambo, Munk, Little Red Riding Hood, Rumpelstiltskin, the Fairy Godmother and the Dwarves are the only characters to return from the first film. None of the cast members and crew return for this film. Andy Dick is replaced by Jim Sullivan, Wallace Shawn is replaced by Kirk Thornton and Michael McShane is replaced by David Lodge.

Happily N'Ever After 2: Snow White—Another Bite @ the Apple was released on DVD on March 24, 2009 by Lionsgate Home Entertainment. The film received even worse reviews than its predecessor, criticizing its animation, writing, voice acting, characters and lesser connection to the first film.

== Plot ==
Once upon a time, Snow White's parents, Queen Grace and the wise King Cole, are very kind to their citizens, as Queen Grace will go around helping any citizen in need. One day, Queen Grace suddenly falls ill and dies but before she does, she tells Snow White "The mirror only tells half the story. True beauty comes from helping others."

Since Queen Grace died when Snow White was young, she never taught Snow White how to help the citizens. Since then, Snow White has turned into a misguided teenager who only likes to hang out with her friends Goldilocks, Bo Peep, and Little Red Riding Hood instead of helping the citizens. A prime example is when Snow White and her friends decide to go to a joust party instead of visiting an orphanage. That day, her father strictly tells her to return before morning and wear the royal robe. Instead, she takes it off and leaves it in the limo. She meets and falls in love with a handsome man. He doesn't return the feeling because of Snow White's behavior towards "riff raff" and his respect for Queen Grace.

When Snow White returns, her father is upset because she did not wear the robe (he found out on the newspaper). Snow White weeps and cries about him being unfair and runs to her room. Her father notices her misguided side and decides to find a wife like Queen Grace to show Snow White how to become a proper lady. His assistant goes to the Fairy Godmother for help, where she begins a marriage service.

Because of Mambo's mischief, the Scales of Good and Evil are tipped to extreme evil, causing Lady Vain to turn evil and Rumpelstiltskin to appear. Rumpelstiltskin (who seems to have become evil again due to the Scales) uses the Magic Mirror to turn Lady Vain's face into a replica of Queen Grace's face. She goes to the marriage service and King Cole accepts her, not knowing that Lady Vain is truly a horrible scheming witch who wants to rule the kingdom.

Snow White is a thorn in Lady Vain's side and she wants Snow White gone from the kingdom. Just then, an apple appears, due to the imbalance of the Scales. When given to Snow White, it will make her say the rudest things she had ever thought. Lady Vain has Rumpelstiltskin give Snow White a new make-over with a twist. They give her the evil apple and with the Magic Mirror, Snow White says the rudest things she had ever thought to the whole town including King Cole. Snow White wakes up not remembering what had happened or what she had said and decides to visit the town.

Because of the rude things she had said, Snow White is forced to leave and runs to the forest. She enters a familiar house, eats, and falls asleep on seven small beds. When she wakes up, she finds the Seven Dwarfs completely enraged with her coming inside without permission. One notices her to be Queen Grace's daughter, although her personality is not like her mother's. They convince Snow White to stay and plan to change her attitude to be just like her mother's. Snow White agrees to do whatever the Dwarfs tell her to do without questioning them or whining back. They go to help rebuild the Three Little Pigs' homes after being blown by the Big Bad Wolf. She also helps the Old Woman Who Lived in a Shoe to turn into the most beautiful woman ever and she helps to babysit her children. Meanwhile, Lady Vain's wedding day is drawing closer.

During baby-sitting, Snow White sings to her children the same "Hush, Little Baby" lullaby that her mother used to sing to her when she was young and realizes that helping others makes her and them feel good. With that, she starts her own Snow White's Help Center.

Meanwhile, at the kingdom, everyone is excited to meet Lady Vain, whose wedding with King Cole will begin at midnight. She hires two bodyguards because she is "not used to being among the people". Sir Peter, one of the bodyguards, finds out about Lady Vain's plan of getting rid of Snow White forever and runs to the woods to find her. He finds her reducing Pinocchio's nose and rebuilding Humpty Dumpty. At first, Snow White does not want to go, but she soon agrees.

They make it just in time, thanks to the help of Mambo and Munk, and enter the wedding. Without being noticed, Snow White goes in front of the altar and tells her father that if he wants to marry Lady Vain, it is his choice and not hers. Lady Vain, who is disgusted and doesn't want Snow White back, says that Snow White is still a horrible misguided teenager and has not changed at all. The citizens have come to save Snow White. Snow White even apologizes in front of everybody. Her father responds "I just want my daughter back" as the crowd awed and cried happily.

Angry that everybody accepts Snow White's apology and ruined the wedding, Lady Vain uses the Magic Mirror to zap Snow White. But the attack is reflected back to the mirror, breaking the spell of Lady Vain's beauty, making her ugly again and starts crying. Before the guards can take Lady Vain away, Snow White goes to her and tells her "You don't need the magic mirror to be beautiful." The Seven Dwarfs come to take her away instead. Snow White finally accepts the royal robe.

The film ends with Snow White, Peter, King Cole, and the townspeople dancing, and they all lived happily ever after.

== Voice cast ==
=== Main voices ===
- Helen Niedwick as Snow White
- Cam Clarke as Peter, King Cole
- Jim Sullivan as Mambo, Magic Mirror
- Kirk Thornton as Munk, Pinocchio
- Cindy Robinson as Lady Vain
- David Lodge as Rumpelstiltskin, Priest
- Kelly Brewster as Humpty Dumpty
- Catherine Lavin as Queen Grace, Fairy Godmother
- Doug Stone as McHugh
- Doug Erholtz as McDowner, Pied Piper, Simple Simon
- Lex Lang as Grimm
- Kate Higgins as Goldilocks, Lucy
- G.K. Bowes as Little Red Riding Hood, Little Bo Peep
- Jennie Fahn as Old Woman in the Shoe

=== Additional voices ===
- Todd Haberkorn as Jack
- Colleen O'Shaughnessey as Jill
- Michael Sinterniklaas as Hansel
- Cassandra Lee Morris as Gretel
- Laura Bailey as The Three Little Pigs, The Children in the Shoe

== Release ==
Vanguard Animation had no involvement with Happily N'Ever After 2: Snow White Another Bite @ the Apple. The film was instead produced by Kickstart Productions and Berlin Animation Film. The film sold 222,042 units making $2,488,134 in revenue.
