= Doug Stone (voice actor) =

American voice actor

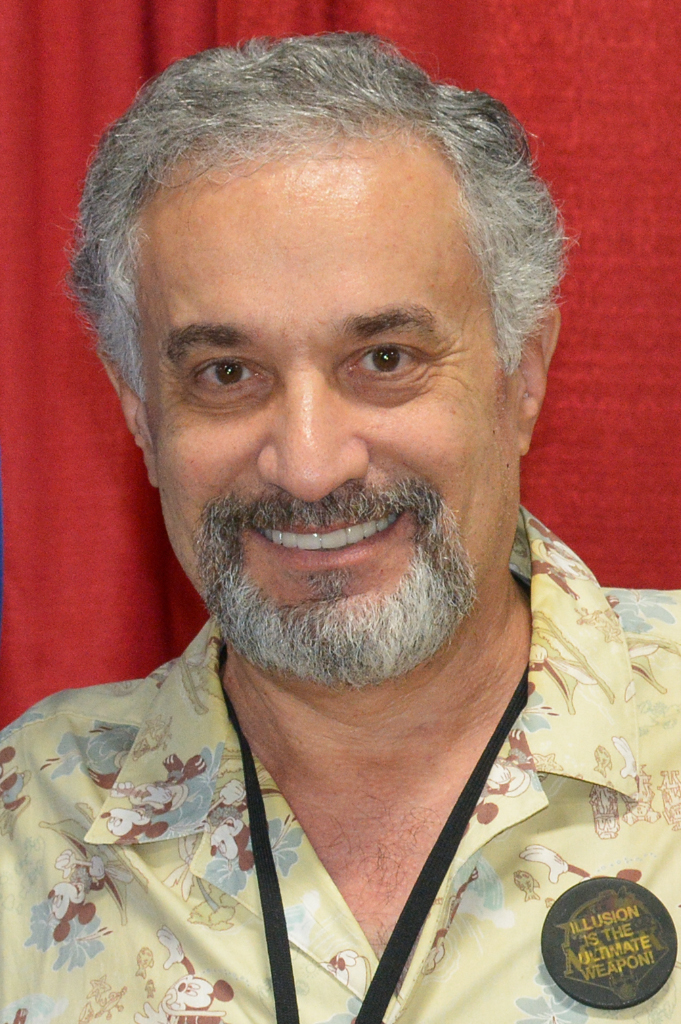
- Stone at the 2015 Retro Con
- Occupation: Voice actor
- Years active: 1972–present

Doug Stone is a voice actor who is best known for providing the English voice of Psycho Mantis from the video game Metal Gear Solid, as well as the voice of Matt Trakker and several other characters in M.A.S.K., and Dragonborg in Beetleborgs Metallix.

== Filmography ==
=== Anime dubbing ===
- .hack//Liminality – Guard D
- Ai Yori Aoshi – Aoi's Father
- Arc the Lad – Ambassador, Dernitas, George, Soldier
- Argento Soma – Dr. Ernest Noguchi
- Armitage III – Lowell Gantz
- Black Magic M-66 – Major
- BlazBlue Alter Memory – Valkenhayn R. Hellsing
- Blue Dragon – General Orehill
- Boruto: Naruto Next Generations – Victor
- Boys Be... – Furata
- Carried by the Wind: Tsukikage Ran – Tonto Sharakusai
- Chobits – Tetsuya Ohmura
- Code Geass: Lelouch of the Rebellion – Noble (Ep. 1), Kusakabe (Ep. 5, 7 & 8)
- Cosmo Warrior Zero – Chief, Soldier A
- Cowboy Bebop – Van
- Daphne in the Brilliant Blue – Tsutomu Hanaoka
- DearS – Gen, Oihiko's Father, Principal
- Detatoko Princess – Jii, Innkeeper, Topaz's Henchman
- Devadasy – Tech
- Digimon Data Squad – Director Hashima
- Dirty Pair: Affair of Nolandia – Shuttle Pilot, Taxi Driver
- Durarara!! – Shingen Kishitani, Shojiro Kitokoma
- El Hazard: The Alternative World – Allujah
- Ergo Proxy – Al, Berkeley, Hoody, Petro Seller
- Eureka Seven – Stoner
- Fafner in the Azure – Mr. Kasugai, Mitsuhiro Bertrand
- Fena: Pirate Princess – Otto
- Figure 17 – Sho's Father
- Gad Guard – Arashi's Father, Curator, Fergus, Man in Bed, Man on Street, News Reporter
- Gankutsuou: The Count of Monte Cristo – Danglars
- Ghost in the Shell: Stand Alone Complex – Matsuoka (ep 10)
- Ghost Slayers Ayashi – Kumoshichi, Master, Yukiwa
- Girls Bravo – Old Customer A (Ep. 14), Vegetable Store Keeper (Ep. 2)
- Great Teacher Onizuka – Police Officer A, Taxi Driver
- Grenadier – Hage's Thug
- Gundress – Mayor, Spike
- Gungrave – Jester, Older Police Officer, Bob Poundmax, Parker
- Gun Frontier – Conductor (Ep. 10), Dr. Surusky, Innkeeper
- Gun Sword – Elle and Earl's Father (Ep. 5), Priest
- Gurren Lagann – Dayakka, Guame
- Heat Guy J – Master Serge Echigo
- Hello Kitty's Paradise – Various
- Hellsing Ultimate – Sir Hugh Islands
- Honeybee Hutch – Various
- Iczer-One – Police Man
- Japan Sinks: 2020 – Kunio Ashida
- JoJo's Bizarre Adventure – Wang Chan, Mario Zeppeli
- Jungle de Ikou! – Dad, TV Announcer
- Kamichu! – God of Kickboard (Ep. 7)
- Karas: The Prophecy – Detective Minoru Sagisaka
- Kekkaishi – Hisui
- Kill La Kill – Mitsuzo Soroi, Principal Bonda (Ep. 1)/ Sōichirō Kiryūin/Isshin Matoi
- Koi Kaze – Zenzo Saeki
- Kyo Kara Maoh! – Raven
- Last Exile – Various
- Lensman – Lekesly, Patrol Captain
- Magical Girl Pretty Sammy – Male Scientist
- Magic Knight Rayearth – Innkeeper, Geo Metro (Season 2)
- Mahoromatic: Something More Beautiful – Canan-Model Android
- Mao-chan – Galaxy the Great, Prime Minister
- Maple Town – Additional Voices
- March Comes In like a Lion - Hanaoka, Arimoto
- Mars Daybreak – O'Connell
- Melody of Oblivion – Teacher
- Mermaid Forest – Toba Islander
- Metal Fighter Miku – Kozo Shibano, Nagoya Shibano
- Mezzo Forte – Bodyguard A, Tagami, Urinal Guy
- Mirage of Blaze – Nobunaga Oda (Ep. 11) Punk (Ep. 8), Yasuhide Tohyama
- Mobile Suit Gundam: The Origin – Jimnba Ral
- Monster – Hess, Ivan Kurten, Mr. Buchner, Bergbach, Mr. Hertz, Mustafa, Schone, Zoback
- Moldiver – Professor Hitoshi Amagi/Dr. Machinegal
- Moribito: Guardian of the Spirit – Gakai, Chamberlain
- Naruto – Fugaku Uchiha, Teyaki Uchiha
- Naruto Shippuden – Fugaku Uchiha, Gerotora, Teyaki Uchiha, Kosuke Maruboshi (Ep. 190, 239)
- New Getter Robo – Lab Staff
- New Gigantor – Bob Brilliant
- Ninja Robots – Various
- Noozles – Additional Voices
- One-Punch Man - Dr. Kuseno
- Orguss 02 – King Mendez
- Otogizōshi – Taroumaru (ep 5)
- Outlanders – Emperor
- Outlaw Star – Swanzo
- Panda! Go, Panda! – Various
- Paranoia Agent – Akio Kawazu
- Phoenix – General, Kimihiro, Oguma, Tonku, Village Mayor
- Planetes – Philippe Myers
- Please Teacher! – Principal Tendo
- R.O.D the TV – Cafe Owner (Ep. 7), Detective (Eps. 1,7), Editor A (Ep. 10), John Smith (Ep. 7), Shop Owner C (Ep. 3), Staff B (Ep. 8), Ushida
- Rave Master – Let
- Requiem from the Darkness – Yasaku (Ep. 3)
- Resident Evil: Infinite Darkness – Wilson
- Rumiko Takahashi Anthology – Doctor, Hazuki's Father, Male Guest, Toshio
- Rurouni Kenshin – Geo, Pirate, Shura's Father, Toshimichi Okubo
- Saber Marionette J Again – Gennai
- Saiyuki Gunlock – Taizou's Father
- Saiyuki Reload – Souryu
- Sakamoto Days – Iriya
- Samurai Champloo – Prison Guard, Villager #2, Yagyu Member #3
- Scrapped Princess – Roy (Ep. 9-10)
- S-CRY-ed – Councilman, Guard, Newscaster, Promoter, Relief Worker, Subordinate C
- The Seven Deadly Sins – Old Knight
- Shaman King - Yohmei Asakura
- Shinzo – Various
- Space Pirate Captain Harlock – Professor Daiba, Minister's Aide, Officer, Crewmember
- Spirit of the Sword – Ukyo
- Strait Jacket – Fahgo
- Street Fighter II V – Customs Inspector (Animaze dub), Masters Corp. Rep. (Animaze dub)
- Sword Art Online – Nishida
- Sword Gai: The Animation - Doctor, Tokumitsu
- Tenchi in Tokyo – Azaka
- Tenchi Muyo! Ryo-Ohki – Azaka (OVA 3)
- Tengen Toppa Gurren Lagann – Dayakka, Guame
- Tenjho Tenge – Tetsu
- Texhnolyze – Promoter
- The Twelve Kingdoms – Chikan Officer, Kakugo, Masashi Nakajima, Matsuyama
- The Wicked and the Damned: A Hundred Tales of Karma - Yasaku (ep. 3)
- Tokko – Kaoru Kunikida
- Uzumaki – Kirie's father
- Vampire Princess Miyu – Genta, Man, Policeman
- Wild Arms: Twilight Venom – Dad
- Witch Hunter Robin – Muroi, Shintaro Kosaka
- Wowser – Various
- Yukikaze – Karl Gunow (Ep. 2)
- X – Additional Voices
- Zenki – Bonze Jukai
- Zillion – J.J.

=== Animation ===
- All-New Dennis the Menace – Additional Voices
- Chucklewood Critters – Lester, Skeeter
- Conan the Adventurer – Additional Voices
- The Return of Dogtanian – Porthos
- The Easter Chipmunk – Various
- Iznogoud – Various
- M.A.S.K. – Matt Trakker, Bruce Sato, Dusty Hayes, Hondo MacLean, Boris "The Czar" Bushkin, Bruno Sheppard, Nash Gorey, Maximus Mayhem
- Walter Melon – Don Diego
- Wisdom of the Gnomes – Klaus
- Lego Friends

=== Live-action ===
- Beetleborgs Metallix – Dragonborg (voice)
- Dynamo Duck – Conrad Crud, Rupert Flybreath, Dr. Know (voice)
- Power Rangers Lost Galaxy – Skelekron (voice)

=== Dubbing of foreign shows in English ===
List of English-language dubbings of foreign language shows
Year	Title	Country	Dubbed from	Role	Live Actor	Source
2016	The Break	Belgium	French	Rudy Geeraerts	Jean-Henri Compère	

=== Films ===
- Akira – Council Member

angel wars guardian force paladin 2004/2009

- Appleseed – Elders, Operator
- Arthur's Missing Pal - TV Detective
- Black Jack The Movie – Charles Rosen
- Cats Don't Dance – Additional Voices
- Cowboy Bebop: The Movie – Analyzer
- Cromartie High – The Movie – Actor 2, Electrician, Gori, Noburo Yamaguchi
- Eureka Seven -good night, sleep tight, young lovers – Stoner
- Fist of the North Star – Torture Victim
- Fly Me to the Moon – Russian Newscaster
- Ghost in the Shell 2: Innocence – Lin
- Godzilla: Planet of the Monsters — Halu-Elu Dolu-do
- Godzilla: City on the Edge of Battle - Halu-Elu Dolu-do
- Godzilla: The Planet Eater - Halu-Elu Dolu-do
- Happily N'Ever After 2: Snow White—Another Bite @ the Apple – McHugh
- Kiki's Delivery Service – Driver 1, Hotel Receptionist, Bakery Customer 1 (Streamline Dub)
- Kite Liberator – Doctor
- Leroy & Stitch – Ensign Gecto
- Lilo & Stitch – Ensign Gecto
- Mobile Suit Gundam (Movies 1–3) – Gihren Zabi
- Mobile Suit Gundam F91 – Gruce Erras
- My Neighbor Totoro – Searcher 1, Mailman (Streamline dub) (uncredited)
- Naruto the Movie: Ninja Clash in the Land of Snow – Buriken
- Osmosis Jones – Police Officer with big germ, Jamie the police officer of Frank Police Department
- Sakura Wars: The Movie – Ikki Yoneda
- The Swan Princess: A Royal Family Tale – Speed
- The Swan Princess Christmas – Speed
- The Swan Princess II: Escape from Castle Mountain – Speed
- The Swan Princess: The Mystery of the Enchanted Kingdom – Speed
- The House of Magic – Lawrence
- Tenchi Muyo! in Love – GP Commander, High School Coach
- Tenchi Forever! The Movie – Azaka
- Thumbelina: A Magical Story - Swallow, Mouse, Insect, Sea Creature, Turtle, Hobbit #1, Hobbit #3 (uncredited)
- The Wings of Honneamise – Noble, Reporter, TV Commentator
- Yu Yu Hakusho: The Movie – Winged Demon

=== Video games ===
- Battlezone – Minor officer
- BlazBlue series – Valkenhayn R. Hellsing
- Dynasty Warriors series – Xu Zhu, Zhang Jiao
- Farmagia – Glaza (credited as Edward Dakota)
- Final Fantasy Crystal Chronicles: Crystal Bearers – Cid
- Fire Emblem Echoes: Shadows of Valentia – Mycen
- Fire Emblem: Three Houses – Gilbert Pronislav, Duke Aegir
- Fire Emblem Warriors: Three Hopes – Gilbert Pronislav, Duke Aegir
- Marvel vs. Capcom: Infinite – Dr. Light
- Master Detective Archives: Rain Code – Servant, Robot Researcher
- Mega Man 11 – Dr. Light
- Metal Gear Solid – Psycho Mantis
- Metal Gear Solid: Integral – Psycho Mantis
- Metal Gear Solid: The Twin Snakes – Psycho Mantis
- Metal Gear Solid 4: Guns of the Patriots – Psycho Mantis
- ParaWorld – Taslov
- Pryzm, Chapter 1: The Dark Unicorn – Karrock
- Quest for Glory V: Dragon Fire – Abdull, Arestes, Gort, Ugarte, Wolfie
- Rave Master – Let Dahaka
- Star Trek: 25th Anniversary – Prelate Angiven, Tlaoxac
- Star Trek: Judgment Rites – Cicissa, Jakesey, Schiller
- StarCraft II: Wings of Liberty – Edmund Duke
- The Space Adventure – Cobra: The Legendary Bandit – Cobra
- Tiny Toon Adventures: Buster and the Beanstalk – Additional Voices
- Xenoblade Chronicles X – Additional voices
- Ys X: Nordics – Joel Asrad

== Staff work ==
- Dynasty Warriors 4 - Producer
- Ghost in the Shell: Stand Alone Complex 2nd GIG - ADR Script
- Iczer-One - Director
- Idol Project - Walla Coach
- Jin Jin and the Panda Patrol - Writer, Producer, Voice Director
- Journey to the Heart of the World - Director
- The Jungle Book 2 - ADR Loop Group
- Little Mouse on the Prairie - Voice Director
- Mars Daybreak - ADR Script
- Mobile Suit Gundam: The Movie Trilogy - Director
- Mojave Moon - ADR Loop Group
- Orguss 02 - ADR Script
- Street Fighter II: The Animated Movie - Casting Director
- The Prince of Egypt - ADR Group
- The Return of Dogtanian - Director
- Shadow Ops: Red Mercury - Casting Director
- Tenchi in Tokyo - ADR Director
- Tenchi Muyo! in Love - ADR Director
- Tenchi Muyo! Daughter of Darkness - ADR Director
- Tenchi Muyo! Tenchi Forever - ADR Director
- Willy Fog 2 - Director
- Wisdom of the Gnomes - Director

=== Documentaries ===
- Adventures in Voice Acting - Himself
