= Joe Ochman =

American actor

- Occupation: Actor
- Years active: 1989–present

Joe Ochman is an American actor who is most active in voice over roles in various animation shows, films, and video games. He is the fourth and current voice of Jiminy Cricket since 2014.

== Filmography ==
=== Live-action ===
- Adventures in Voice Acting – Himself
- Ally McBeal – Patron #1
- Best Friends Whenever - Ulrich
- Big Bad Beetleborgs – Hypnomaniac
- Buffy the Vampire Slayer – Janitor
- Desperate Housewives – Justice of the Peace
- Garfield: The Movie – Engineer #3
- House – Surgeon
- How High – Ben Franklin
- Judging Amy – Tanner
- Malcolm in the Middle – Announcer
- Married... with Children – Guy
- NYPD Blue – Al Fickman
- Saved by the Bell: The New Class – Repairman
- Saving Lincoln – Judge David Davis
- Seinfeld – Customer
- Will & Grace – Chuck
- CSI: Crime Scene Investigation - Man #2, Bird Watcher
- Criminal Minds: Suspect Behavior - Medical Examiner
- House of Lies - Middle Management
- Bones - Barry McGee

=== Anime ===
- B-Daman Crossfire – Dragren
- Bastard!! Heavy Metal, Dark Fantasy - Doshi
- Bleach – Hachigen "Hacchi" Ushoda, Ryu Kuzu, Shin'etsu Kisaragi, Shūsuke Amagai
- BNA: Brand New Animal - Prime Minister Shiramizu
- Bobobo-bo Bo-bobo – Softon
- Coppelion – Natsume
- Cowboy Bebop – Gordon's Henchman B
- Cyborg 009 – Cyborg 0010
- Digimon Adventure 02 – Crabmon/Coelamon
- Digimon Data Squad – Kevin Crier, Deputymon #1, Soldier #2, UlforceVeedramon
- Digimon Fusion – Dondokomon
- Digimon Tamers – Makuramon
- Dorohedoro - Jonson
- Duel Masters – Hakuoh (Season 1.5)
- Flint the Time Detective – Nascal, Uglinator
- Godzilla Singular Point — Makita K. Nakagawa
- Hunter x Hunter – Zeno Zoldyck
- JoJo's Bizarre Adventure – Will A. Zeppeli
- Mon Colle Knights – Prince Eccentro
- Naruto – Poccha
- Naruto Shippuden – Nekomata (Ep. 189), Tekuno Kanden (Ep. 190)
- Overman King Gainer – Manman Douton
- Stellvia – Richard James
- Tengen Toppa Gurren Lagann – Gabal Docker
- Transformers: Robots in Disguise – Hightower
- Wolf's Rain – Owl
- Zatch Bell! – Various
- Little Witch Academia -Paul Hanbridge

=== Animation ===
- Animalia – Wooster Q. Weasel
- Doc McStuffins – Mayor Billington
- Hubert & Takako – Hubert, Additional Voices
- The Idhun Chronicles – Mago Szish
- Miraculous: Tales of Ladybug & Cat Noir – André Bourgeois, Additional Voices
- Tree Fu Tom – Squirmtum
- The Wonderful World of Mickey Mouse – Jiminy Cricket

=== Audiobooks ===
- Skin in the Game by Nassim Nicholas Taleb

=== Films ===
- Bleach: Hell Verse – Taikon
- Chickenhare and the Hamster of Darkness – Abe
- Cowboy Bebop: The Movie – Climate Control Worker, Warehouse Patrolman
- Ernest & Celestine – Rat Lawyer
- Ghost Cat Anzu – Yo-Chan
- Godzilla: City on the Edge of Battle – Endurphe
- Godzilla: Planet of the Monsters — Endurphe
- Mobile Suit Gundam F91 – Roy Jung
- Patlabor: The Movie – Mikiyasu Shinshi
- Seal Team - Seal
- The Little Polar Bear – Caruso
- The House of Magic – Mr. Eames
- The Son of Bigfoot – Trapper the Raccoon, Tom
- The Swan Princess Christmas – Bromley, Butley
- The Swan Princess: A Royal Family Tale – Bromley
- Truth or Dare – Callux

=== Dubbing of foreign shows in English ===
List of English-language dubbings of foreign language shows
Year	Title	Country	Dubbed from	Role	Live Actor	Source
2012–2015	Violetta	Argentina	Spanish	Antonio Fernández	Alberto Fernández de Rosa	
2016–2018	Marseille	France	French	Dr. Osmont	Hippolyte Girardot	

=== Video games ===
- Call of Duty: Advanced Warfare – Additional Voices
- Command & Conquer 4: Tiberian Twilight – Additional Voices
- Diablo III – Additional Voices
- Diablo III: Reaper of Souls – Additional Voices
- Dishonored 2 – Guards
- Fallout 4 – Male Children of Atom, Vault Security
- Final Fantasy XV: Episode Ardyn – Additional Voices
- Fire Emblem: Three Houses – Solon, Tomas
- Fire Emblem Warriors: Three Hopes – Solon, Tomas
- Iron Chef America: Supreme Cuisine – Marty Bianco
- Kingdom Hearts HD 2.5 Remix – Jiminy Cricket (Re:Coded HD Cinematics)
- Kingdom Hearts III – Jiminy Cricket
- Lichdom: Battlemage – Additional Voices
- Life Is Strange – William Price
- Life Is Strange: Before the Storm – William Price (bonus episode "Farewell")
- Mr. Payback: An Interactive Movie – Candy Man
- Murdered: Soul Suspect – Adam Grantham, Gus Harvey, Nathan Pope
- Red Dead Redemption – Professor Harold MacDougal, Government Clerk
- Red Dead Redemption: Undead Nightmare – Professor Harold MacDougal (uncredited)
- Relayer'' – Yodaka
- The Evil Within – Additional Voices
- World of Final Fantasy – Thane of Saronia, Uncle Takka
- World of Warcraft: Battle for Azeroth – Harlan Sweete, Kiro, Renzik the Shiv
- World of Warcraft: Cataclysm – Zanzil, Various
