= The Swan Princess =

- Theatrical release poster
- Directed by: Richard Rich
- Screenplay by: Brian Nissen
- Story by: Richard Rich; Brian Nissen
- Based on: Swan Lake by Pyotr Ilyich Tchaikovsky
- Produced by: Richard Rich; Jared F. Brown
- Starring: Jack Palance; Howard McGillin; Michelle Nicastro; John Cleese; Steven Wright; Steve Vinovich; Mark Harelik; James Arrington; Joel McKinnon Miller; Dakin Matthews; Sandy Duncan
- Edited by: Armetta Jackson-Hamlett; James Koford
- Music by: Lex de Azevedo
- Production companies: Nest Entertainment; Rich Animation Studios
- Distributed by: New Line Cinema (North America); Columbia TriStar Film Distributors International (International)
- Release date: November 18, 1994
- Running time: 89 minutes
- Country: United States
- Language: English
- Budget: $21 million
- Box office: $9.8 million

The Swan Princess is a 1994 American animated musical romance fantasy comedy film loosely based on the 1877 ballet Swan Lake by Pyotr Tchaikovsky. The film was directed by former Disney animation director Richard Rich, who also produced the movie with Jared F. Brown, who also serving as executive producer with Seldon O. Young, from a screenplay written by Brian Nissen, and based on a story by Rich and Nissen, with a musical score by Lex de Azevedo, who also wrote the songs with lyricist David Zippel. It stars the voices of Jack Palance, Howard McGillin, Michelle Nicastro, John Cleese, Steven Wright, Steve Vinovich, Mark Harelik, James Arrington, Joel McKinnon Miller, Dakin Matthews, and Sandy Duncan.

The film was produced by Nest Family Entertainment and Rich Animation Studios and distributed by New Line Cinema in North America and by Columbia TriStar Film Distributors International in international markets. Released theatrically on November 18, 1994, The Swan Princess received mixed reviews from critics, and grossed $9.8 million against a $21 million budget, becoming a box-office bomb, mostly due to struggling competition with the release of The Lion King (1994). It later became popular through home video releases and has since been followed by a series of direct-to-video sequels starting in 1997.

The theme song "Far Longer than Forever" is performed by Regina Belle and Jeffrey Osborne. The song was nominated for a Golden Globe in 1995 for Best Original Song.

== Plot ==
King William and his friend Queen Uberta are the monarchs of two neighbouring kingdoms and they both have a child; Uberta has a son named Derek and William has a same-aged daughter named Odette. The two parents plan for their children to wed when they grow up so they can unite their two kingdoms forever. However, an evil sorcerer named Rothbart plans to take King William's kingdom for himself. However, William discovers his plans and destroys Rothbart's powers in a raid. He is banished afterward, but not before swearing revenge on William.

While growing up, Derek and Odette are forced to spend all of their holidays together to get acquainted; they do not get along very well as children and teenagers but when they reach adulthood, they finally fall in love. However, when Derek is unable to think of anything he loves Odette for besides her stunning beauty, she rejects him in disappointment. On her way home, she and her father are ambushed by Rothbart, who having fully regained his powers, transforms into a "Great Animal", kidnapping Odette and mortally wounding William. The dying William tells Derek about the Great Animal and Odette's disappearance. The kingdom assumes that she is dead, but Derek is determined to find her.

Rothbart keeps Odette captive at Swan Lake, where he puts her under a spell where Odette transforms into a swan during the day, and temporarily back into a human at night if she stands on the lake when the moonlight touches it. Rothbart's goal is to marry Odette so he can rule the kingdom. During her captivity, she befriends a turtle named Speed, a French frog named Jean-Bob, and an Irish puffin named Lieutenant Puffin. The next day, Odette and her friends venture into Rothbart's castle to get a map.

In the forest, Derek mistakes Odette for the Great Animal and tries to kill her. The ensuing chase leads him to Swan Lake, where he witnesses her reverting into her human form. Odette tells Derek that to break the spell, he must make a vow of everlasting love. He invites her to the ball, hoping to declare to the world his love. However, Rothbart transforms his hag sidekick, Bridget, into a doppelgänger of Odette to deceive Derek into making his vow to the wrong woman, which will kill the real Odette. On the night of the ball, he imprisons Odette and Derek's friend Bromley.

Puffin, Speed and Jean Bob free Odette, who flies to the castle to warn Derek, but he ends up making the vow. Realizing his mistake, Derek follows Odette back to Swan Lake, where she dies in his arms. A distraught Derek angrily confronts and battles Rothbart. With the help of Bromley and Odette's animal friends, Derek kills him. Derek then confesses his love to Odette, realizing that it is the person Odette has become that he loves about her, reviving her and the spell on her is broken by his love. Derek and Odette get married and move into Rothbart's castle, along with Uberta, butler Lord Rogers, footman Sir Chamberlain, Bromley, Bridget, and the animals.

== Voice cast ==
- Michelle Nicastro as Princess Odette, King William's daughter who became a swan.
  - Liz Callaway provides the singing voice for Princess Odette, while Adrian Zahiri does the singing voice for Young Odette
- Howard McGillin as Prince Derek, Queen Uberta's laid-back and courageous son who must embark on an adventure to save Odette.
  - Adam Wylie provides the singing voice for Prince Derek as a young lad.
- Jack Palance as Rothbart, a vengeful sorcerer who places a curse on Odette in his attempt to conquer the kingdom.
  - Lex de Azevedo provided the singing voice for Rothbart.
- John Cleese as Jean-Bob, a French frog who develops a crush on Odette.
  - David Zippel provided the singing voice for Jean-Bob.
- Steven Wright as Lorenzo "Speed" Trudgealong, a wise-cracking turtle.
  - Jonathan Hadary provided the singing voice for Speed.
- Steve Vinovich as Lieutenant/General Puffin, the self-appointed leader of the animal trio.
- Sandy Duncan as Queen Uberta, Prince Derek's jolly and oblivious mother.
- James Arrington as Sir Chamberlain, Uberta's loyal first footman.
  - Davis Gaines provided the singing voice for Sir Chamberlain.
- Dakin Matthews as King William, Odette's benevolent father who was assassinated by Rothbart early in the film.
- Mark Harelik as Lord Rogers, Uberta's posh butler and Derek's musician tutor.
- Joel McKinnon Miller as Bromley, Derek's cowardly chap.
- Brian Nissen as the Narrator
- Tom Alan Robbins as a flute-playing musician
- Bess Hopper as Bridget, Rothbart's henchwoman.

The chorus consists of Catte Adams, Stephen W. Amerson, Beth Andersen, Susan Boyd, Amick Byram, Randy Crenshaw, Michael Dees, Jim Haas, Debbie Hall, Angie Jaree, Bob Joyce, Jon Joyce, Kerry Katz, Tampa M. Lann, Rick Logan, Susan McBride, Bobbie Page, Sally Stevens, Susan Stevens-Logan, Gary Stockdale, Carmen Twillie, and Oren Waters

== Production ==
Having previously directed The Fox and the Hound (1981) and The Black Cauldron (1985) at Walt Disney Feature Animation in Burbank, California, Richard Rich was slated to co-direct Oliver & Company (1988) until he was fired by Disney feature animation president Peter Schneider. Following his departure from Disney, he subsequently formed his own studio, Rich Animation Studios with about 26 employees, in which most of his key employees came from Disney, including the company's marketing chief, Matt Mazer. Subsequently, Jared F. Brown from Living Scriptures, Inc. tapped Rich into producing half-hour animated videos based on the audio cassette readings of the Book of Mormon.

Inspired by the success of Don Bluth's animated films as well as Disney's early-1990s animation renaissance, Rich decided to adapt the German folk tale version of Swan Lake. During production, the script went through twelve drafts over the course of two years. Rich would later attempt to sell his script to several Hollywood studios but to no success. Later, Brown struck on the idea of merging Rich Animation Studios, Family Entertainment Network, and Cassette Duplicators Inc., a cassette-duplicating operation in West Valley City, Utah, into one production holding company called Nest Entertainment.

The film was created by hand painting cels, a tedious technique which caused Rich and his crew to take over four years to produce the final product. Most of the cel painting was done at Hanho Heung-Up in Seoul, South Korea. Overall, 275 animators and artists worked throughout the film's production.

== Music ==
David Zippel was approached by Richard Rich to write the lyrics to songs for The Swan Princess, while the songs and score were composed by Lex de Azevedo.

The theme song "Far Longer than Forever" was written by de Azevedo and Zippel. In the film, the song was performed by vocalists Liz Callaway (as the singing voice of Princess Odette) and Howard McGillin (as the speaking and singing voice of Prince Derek). In the closing credits, a pop/R&B rendition of the song was performed by recording artists Regina Belle and Jeffrey Osborne. In the 1997 sequel The Swan Princess: Escape from Castle Mountain, Michelle Nicastro sings a reprise of the song.

Caryn James of The New York Times noted the "melody of 'Far Longer Than Forever' ... echoes the first five notes of 'Beauty and the Beast'." Animation historian Jerry Beck wrote in his book The Animated Movie Guide that the song had a theme of faith. The pop single was jointly released by Sony Wonder and Sony 550 Music. MusicHound Soundtracks: The Essential Album Guide to Film, Television and Stage Music called the "seemingly mandatory big ballad" "extremely annoying" due to "strik[ing] a totally different artistic note" in the context of the film's musical landscape. The 1995 edition of The Motion Picture Guide felt the "love theme" was deserving of the Golden Globe. John Hartl of The Seattle Times deemed the song "insistent", noting that audiences may "quickly get their fill" of the tune.

"Far Longer than Forever" was nominated for a Golden Globe in 1995 for Best Original Song.

== Release ==
When The Swan Princess was nearing completion, New Line Cinema purchased the distribution rights in the United States, and Columbia TriStar Film Distributors International obtained the foreign distribution rights. The film was theatrically released on November 18, 1994. A home video release followed on August 1, 1995.

=== Marketing ===
Pillsbury partnered with Turner Home Entertainment for a marketing campaign to promote the film's home video release.

=== Home media ===
Turner Home Entertainment first released The Swan Princess on VHS and LaserDisc in the Turner Family Showcase collection on August 3, 1995, and sold over 2.5 million units. Outside the United States, Columbia TriStar Home Video released it on VHS. On March 30, 2004, Columbia TriStar Home Entertainment released the film for the first time on DVD, in Special Edition. The Special Edition DVD contains a few extras, including trailers, a read-along feature, a sing-along feature, and games. Sony Pictures Home Entertainment later re-released the Special Edition DVD on August 18, 2009. It was also released as a double-feature DVD with its sequel The Swan Princess: The Mystery of the Enchanted Kingdom. A Blu-ray version of the film was released on October 29, 2019, for its 25th anniversary.

== Reception ==
=== Box office ===
During its opening weekend, The Swan Princess opened in tenth place at the box office, earning $2.4 million. It eventually grossed $9.8 million against a $21 million budget, becoming a box office bomb, mostly due to struggling competition with several other family films and a re-release of The Lion King.

Disney's reissuing of The Lion King just as this film was being released was seen as "sabotage" by Variety.

=== Critical response ===
The Swan Princess received mixed reviews. Roger Ebert of the Chicago Sun-Times gave the film three out of four stars, writing "Despite the comparatively limited resources at his disposal, Richard Rich shows that he understands the recent Disney animated renaissance and can create some of the same magic. The movie isn't in the same league as Disney's big four, and it doesn't have the same crossover appeal to adults, but as family entertainment, it's bright and cheerful, and it has its moments." Similarly, Hal Hinson of The Washington Post said it was a better film than The Lion King, praising its "fluid, unhurried pace" and "lush, original sense of color", though deeming the score "[not] terribly distinctive". Caryn James of The New York Times noted the film's similarities to Beauty and the Beast (1991), writing it was "not quite as good or fresh, but it's delicious all the same, bound to amuse children and entertain their trapped parents, too."

Brian Lowry of Variety stated the film was "technically impressive but rather flat and languid storywise". James Berardinelli of ReelViews gave the film 2 1/2 stars of 4, writing that "much of The Swan Princess is trite and uninspired", though added "nevertheless, despite its problems, The Swan Princess is actually one of the better non-Disney animated productions to come along in a while". Gene Siskel of The Chicago Tribune gave the film two out of four stars, writing the film is a "casually drawn tale of a boring prince and princess tormented by a dull sorcerer. The songs are weak, and no relationship is developed between the principals." On Rotten Tomatoes, The Swan Princess has an approval rating of 46% based on 13 reviews and an average score of 6/10.On Metacritic, the film has a weighted average score of 70 out of 100 based on reviews from 15 critics, indicating "generally favorable" reviews.

== Legacy ==
Despite receiving mixed reviews and being a box office bomb, the film spawned a franchise of the same name, including nine direct-to-DVD sequels that began in 1997. The latest installment, The Swan Princess: A Fairy Tale is Born, released in 2023.

=== 25th anniversary ===
For the 25th anniversary of the film, it was remastered in high definition for the first time, with a collectible anniversary edition Blu-ray and in 4K HDR on digital. A screening of the remastered edition was held at the W Hotel in Hollywood.

=== 30th anniversary ===
The film celebrated its 30th anniversary on November 18, 2024. Celebrations included a collectible limited-edition 30th-anniversary logo pin, a 12-movie DVD box set featuring a "Swanderful" music box, and a 30th Anniversary Dress Design Contest was held for the fans, featuring a new, handmade Odette gown designed by Shayna Snyder, who won the contest. The milestone coincides with 'National Princess Day'.

== See also ==
- Swan Lake (1981 film)
