= The Swan Princess: Escape from Castle Mountain =

- Home video cover
- Directed by: Richard Rich
- Screenplay by: Brian Nissen
- Story by: Richard Rich; Brian Nissen
- Based on: Swan Lake by Pyotr Ilyich Tchaikovsky
- Produced by: Richard Rich; Jared F. Brown
- Starring: Michelle Nicastro; Douglas Sills; Jake Williamson; Doug Stone; Steve Vinovich; Christy Landers; Donald Sage MacKay; Joey Camen
- Cinematography: Tom Sheppard
- Edited by: James Koford; Joseph Campana; Paul Murphy
- Music by: Lex de Azevedo
- Production companies: Nest Entertainment; Rich Animation Studios
- Distributed by: Legacy Releasing (North America); Columbia TriStar Film Distributors International (International)
- Release dates: July 18, 1997 (United States limited release); September 2, 1997 (United States full release)
- Running time: 71 minutes
- Country: United States
- Language: English
- Box office: $273,644 (US)

The Swan Princess: Escape from Castle Mountain, alternatively known as The Swan Princess and the Secret of the Castle in European territories, is a 1997 American animated musical fantasy comedy film and the first direct-to-video sequel to the 1994 animated film The Swan Princess. Directed by Richard Rich (who also directed the original), the film follows Derek and Odette's first anniversary of their wedding being disrupted by the actions of a wicked magician, Clavius, who wants to find a magical orb, the source of the Forbidden Arts, and take over the world. The film was released on July 18, 1997. Unlike the first film, Michelle Nicastro, who had recorded several albums prior to the release of the first film, was allowed to do her own singing.

== Plot ==
Prince Derek and Princess Odette's anniversary is interrupted by vandalism from Knuckles, the minion of Clavius, an evil magician who was the partner-in-crime of Derek and Odette's enemy, Rothbart; they conquered the Forbidden Arts together until Rothbart betrayed Clavius and drove him underground. Now, he wants to claim the magical orb of the Forbidden Arts that is located somewhere in Swan Lake Castle, which has become Derek and Odette's new home. Clavius has Knuckles perform acts of vandalism in the kingdom that keep Derek very busy and make him neglect both his wife and mother.

On Queen Uberta's fiftieth birthday, she is abducted by Clavius, who wants to use her as leverage. When Uberta's first footman, Sir Chamberlain, sends Derek the letter, stating that Uberta has been captured, he sets out to rescue his mother. Meanwhile, Clavius sneaks into the castle, where he kidnaps Odette, locks her in a tower and then goes after the orb himself. Bridget, who was Rothbart's accomplice but has turned good, recognizes Clavius and knows that he is after the Forbidden Arts. She takes Speed, Puffin, and Jean-Bob into the catacombs under the castle where they find the orb first. After claiming the orb, they race back upstairs and free Odette. Odette knows now that Derek is heading into a trap, but Puffin cannot fly because his tail has been injured by Knuckles, so she convinces Bridget to use the orb to change her into a swan. Once transformed, Odette flies off to warn Derek. Clavius stumbles upon the remaining group and a chase ensues. Clavius eventually obtains the orb, and locks Bridget and the animals in the watery dungeon, although they later manage to escape.

Meanwhile, Princess Odette reaches Derek in time to save him from drowning in a pit of quicksand. Racing back to the castle, Odette and Derek see Clavius escaping in his hot-air balloon, from which Speed, Puffin, and Jean-Bob are secretly clinging to in the hopes of being able to regain the orb. Derek and Odette follow the balloon to Clavius' volcano lair. Knuckles tries to stop them, and after a fight, Knuckles falls into the lava pool beneath the volcano.

Clavius celebrates his regaining the Forbidden Arts again, but Derek arrives and the animals free Uberta from her prison. During the fight, Jean-Bob jumps on Clavius' head to stop him from delivering a killing blow to Derek. Unfortunately, Jean-Bob is killed when he is thrown off. Derek gets his hands on the orb, and the group rushes to escape in Clavius' balloon. Clavius tries to stop them, and during the struggle, the orb is dropped and shatters; Clavius dies in the resulting eruption, while everyone escapes.

Later, everyone is at Swan Lake, waiting for the moon to rise on Odette, who is waiting on the surface with Jean-Bob on her wing. When the moonlight touches Odette, she is transformed back to her human form and Jean-Bob is revived. The gang celebrates their victory and Uberta's birthday. The following day, her butler, Lord Rogers, tells Derek that a royal guest from Lincolnshire had arrived at the castle, but Derek asks Rogers to take care of it, as he wishes to spend the day with Odette. The two share a kiss, enjoying their time together alone at last.

== Cast ==
- Michelle Nicastro – Princess Odette
- Douglas Sills – Prince Derek
  - Kenneth Cope provided the singing voice for this film's end credits version of Far Longer than Forever but not on No Fear Rap.
- Jake Williamson – Sir Clavius
  - Michael Lanning provided the singing voice for You Gotta Love It but not on No Fear Rap.
- Christy Landers – Queen Uberta
- Donald Sage MacKay – Jean-Bob
- Doug Stone – Speed
- Steve Vinovich – Puffin
- Joseph Medrano – Lord Rogers
- James Arrington – Sir Chamberlain
- Joey Camen – Sir Knuckles
- Owen Miller – Bromley
- Rosie Mann – Bridget

== Songs ==
- "The Magic of Love" - performed by Michelle Nicastro
- "That's What You Do for a Friend" - performed by Michelle Nicastro, Steve Vinovich, Doug Stone, and Donald Sage MacKay
- "You Gotta Love It" - performed by Michael Lanning
- "Far Longer than Forever" (end credits)" - performed by Michelle Nicastro and Kenneth Cope, lyrics by David Zippel
- "No Fear Rap" - performed by Michelle Nicastro, Jake Williamson, Doug Stone, Donald Sage MacKay, Joey Camen, Douglas Sills, Christy Landers, Steve Vinovich, Joseph Medrano, and James Arrington

== Release ==
The film had a limited theatrical release on July 18, 1997 with a domestic gross of $273,644. On September 2, 1997, Warner Home Video released the film on VHS in the Warner Bros. Family Entertainment collection. In 1999, it was included in a VHS gift set released in the United Kingdom by Columbia TriStar Home Video (containing all three The Swan Princess movies). The DVD of the film was released in the United States by Sony Pictures Home Entertainment on August 18, 2009. In February 2004 in Europe, it was released in a DVD set by Columbia TriStar Home Entertainment (which containing all three The Swan Princess movies with a bonus sing-a-long disc). However, unlike the first and third films, it did not get released on DVD in the United States until August 17, 2009.

== Reception ==
Critical response was mixed to negative. Kevin Thomas of the Los Angeles Times considered the sequel less inspired than the original, but praised its traditional storybook visual style, voice performances, and songs. He concluded that small children would probably enjoy it, although adults might find its approach old-fashioned.

Jeff Vice of the Deseret News gave a more negative assessment, criticizing Clavius as an ineffective replacement for Rothbart and finding the animation, replacement voice performances, story, songs, humor, and synthesized score inferior to those of the first film. Vice also objected to the film's treatment of its villains and noted that Odette had been reduced to a secondary role.

Renee Schonfeld of Common Sense Media rated the film two out of five stars. She described it as a conventional good-versus-evil story dominated by action sequences and said that its story, music, and characterization failed to match the original. She also criticized the reduced role given to Odette and the absence of several of the original film's voice actors.
