= Michelle Nicastro =

American actress (1960–2010)

- Born: March 31, 1960; Washington, D.C., U.S.
- Died: November 4, 2010 (aged 50); Los Angeles, California, U.S.
- Education: Northwestern University (BFA)
- Occupations: Actress; singer
- Years active: 1981–2000
- Spouse: Steve Stark (m. 1986)
- Children: 2

Michelle Nicastro (March 31, 1960 – November 4, 2010) was an American actress and singer.

== Life and career ==
Nicastro was born in Washington, D.C. In 1960, she graduated with a Bachelor of Fine Arts (BFA) from Northwestern University. In 1983, Nicastro moved to Los Angeles with her then-boyfriend and future husband, Steve Stark. There, she worked for the retail clothing store Ann Taylor. Shortly after, Nicastro was cast as Ariadne in the Broadway musical Merlin.

Back in Los Angeles, Nicastro appeared in her first television role in an episode of Airwolf in 1984. She guest-starred in several television programs, including Cover Up, Charles in Charge, Who's the Boss?, Knight Rider, Murder, She Wrote, and Full House. In 1989, Nicastro guest-starred on the episode "Mr. Spark" for the Showtime series It's Garry Shandling's Show, where she co-wrote and performed an original song, "He's Garry, The Boy Next Door". She was the co-recipient of the CableACE Award for Best Original Song.

In 1987, Nicastro filmed her part in Days of Our Lives for a week, and then auditioned for the musical productions Leave It to Jane and The Boys From Syracuse at the Doolittle Theatre. Dan Sullivan, in a theater review for the Los Angeles Times, felt Nicastro had "a lovely, vulnerable quality" in The Boys From Syracuse, but was less complimentary of her performance in Leave It to Jane, in which she played the title role. He wrote: "Nicastro gave a supporting performance Saturday night, where a star-size one was called for."

In 1988, Nicastro originated the role of Éponine in Les Misérables during the second U.S. national tour, which opened in Los Angeles at the Shubert Theatre. She was awarded the Drama-Logue Award and the Robby Award. A year later, Nicastro appeared as Amanda, the college sweetheart of Billy Crystal's Harry, who introduces him to Meg Ryan's Sally in When Harry Met Sally... (1989).

For The Swan Princess (1994), director Richard Rich stated for the role of adult Princess Odette: "I wanted a voice that said princess when you heard it. It had a princess quality with strength and character and goodness and charm." With the assistance of Broadway casting directors, they auditioned numerous actresses but none of them, according to Rich, had "that charm that I was looking for – that real princess sound."

Nicastro, who was performing in Les Misérables at the Los Angeles Music Center at the time, auditioned and won the role. While Nicastro did the speaking voice, fellow Broadway actress Liz Callaway provided the singing role for Odette. Nicastro reprised the role in the first two sequels The Swan Princess: Escape from Castle Mountain (1997) and The Swan Princess III: The Mystery of the Enchanted Treasure (1998).

While she was recording for The Swan Princess, Nicastro was asked by Bruce Kimmel, a record producer, if she wanted to record a soundtrack album with him. She agreed and chose the musical selection, which were songs from Disney animated films. She stated: "I love the Disney stuff, and at the time, they had just done The Little Mermaid. And what I liked about it, is it's not like 'heavy' Broadway. It's more like a pop-Broadway. It has its own thing to it. It's a little bit pop. And it suits my voice right." Her first soundtrack Toonful led to a recording contract with Varèse Sarabande. She followed up with Toonful, Too; Reel Imagination, which features songs from family musical films, and On My Own, which features songs from contemporary Broadway musicals.

== Death ==
Nicastro was diagnosed with breast cancer on her 40th birthday. Soon after, she and three friends established Truly Mom, a custom stationery company. In 2009, they were named "Women Entrepreneurs of the Year" by Country Living. On November 4, 2010, Nicastro died of cancer at her home in Toluca Lake, at the age of 50.

"For the Good of Our Country", an episode of The Event that originally aired November 15 the same year, is dedicated to her memory. The pilot episode of Fairly Legal, originally aired January 20, 2011, was dedicated to her memory, and a character in the series, Judge David Nicastro (played by Gerald McRaney), is named after her. Both series were executive produced by her husband Steve Stark.

== Partial filmography ==
- Body Rock (1984) - Darlene
- Knight Rider (1985) - "Circus Knights" - Terry Major
- Bad Guys (1986) - Janice Edwards
- Full House (1987) - "Sea Cruise" - Roxanna
- When Harry Met Sally... (1989) - Amanda
- The Swan Princess (1994) - Princess Odette (as an adult; speaking voice)
- Coach (1996) - Mary Beth (as Dauber's girlfriend - episode: "Grimworld")
- Wings (1996) - Ariel Reed (as Antonio's dream girl - episode: "The Lady Vanishes")
- The Swan Princess: Escape from Castle Mountain (1997) - Princess Odette (voice; speaking and singing)
- The Swan Princess III: The Mystery of the Enchanted Treasure (1998) - Princess Odette (voice; speaking and singing)
- Xena: Warrior Princess (1998) - "The Bitter Suite" - Callisto (singing voice only)
- Aladdin and the Adventure of All Time (2000) - Queen Cleopatra
