= The Swan Princess: A Royal Family Tale =

- Release poster
- Directed by: Richard Rich
- Screenplay by: Brian Nissen
- Story by: Richard Rich; Brian Nissen
- Based on: Swan Lake by Pyotr Ilyich Tchaikovsky Characters created by Richard Rich; Brian Nissen
- Produced by: Richard Rich; Seldon O. Young; Jared F. Brown
- Starring: Laura Bailey; Yuri Lowenthal; Joseph Medrano
- Edited by: Joe Campana
- Music by: J Bateman
- Production companies: Crest Animation Productions; Nest Family Entertainment; Sony Wonder
- Distributed by: Sony Pictures Home Entertainment
- Release date: February 25, 2014
- Running time: 79 minutes
- Country: United States
- Language: English

The Swan Princess: A Royal Family Tale is a 2014 American animated musical fantasy adventure film produced by Crest Animation Productions and Nest Family Entertainment, directed by Richard Rich and starring the voices of Laura Bailey as Odette and Yuri Lowenthal as Derek. It is the fifth film in The Swan Princess series, and follows Odette and Derek's adoption of a young girl named Alise along with their defeating the evil Forbidden Arts. It was released direct-to-DVD and Blu-ray on February 25, 2014 for the franchise's 20th anniversary. A sixth film titled The Swan Princess: Princess Tomorrow, Pirate Today was released on September 6, 2016.

== Plot ==
Centuries ago, a sentient evil force known as the Forbidden Arts entered Earth from the underworld, intent on destroying all of its rivals for magical power. A group of unusually large and talking flying squirrels, called the scullions, formed a community dedicated to finding and destroying the Swan Princess. When Odette, the Swan Princess, was finally born to King William, the Forbidden Arts tried to use the evil sorcerer Rothbart to defeat her but failed due to Rothbart being killed by Derek.

In the present, Odette and Derek are pressured by Uberta to have a child, and are unaware that they're being tracked by the scullions, (two in particular, Cutter and Jojo, a pair of "Master Trapmaker" brothers). The Forbidden Arts has joined forces with Mangler, the scullion leader, but is angered at their most recent failure. The Forbidden Arts leaves its cave to burn Odette alive, but is blocked by Odette's power and has to return to the crystal in its cave to recover. A nearby house catches fire instead, where a little girl named Alise's father is murdered. Odette and Derek bring Alise to the castle, and Odette feels a kinship with her because they both lost their fathers tragically. Although Alise refuses to speak, she slowly becomes closer to Odette and Derek, and they decide to adopt her as she has no living relatives.

The scullions attack Uberta's castle, kidnapping Alise to lure Odette and Derek away, and locking everyone else in the cellar. Odette and Derek avoid the scullions' traps but Derek is poisoned by Mangler's blow dart. A friendly scullion, whom Odette names Scully, cures Derek and explains about the fake Swan Princess legend and the Forbidden Arts, and reveals that he has been keeping the magical stone safe. The group goes to rescue Alise.

While Derek acts as a distraction, Scully sneaks into the scullion village and finds Alise in the Forbidden Arts' cave, but he is unable to rescue her. When the scullions are about to execute Derek, Odette intervenes and explains that all she wants is for her loved ones to be safe. Scully tells the scullions that the legend is a lie and the true evil is the Forbidden Arts. Mangler shoots a poison dart at Odette, which is blocked by Jojo, the younger of the two brothers from before. Odette cures him with an antidote prepared by Scully, and the tablet with the corrupted prophecy reveals the true prophecy about the Swan Princess.

At the castle, Uberta and Rogers are about to be punished by the scullions for protecting the Swan Princess, and declare their feelings for each other. Jojo and the other scullions arrive with the real prophecy tablet, proving Odette to be good, and they release Uberta and the captives. The scullion army works together with Derek, Puffin, Jean-Bob and Speed to protect the magical stone, but the Forbidden Arts manages to obtain it, gaining its power.

Odette and Scully enter the Forbidden Arts' cave to rescue Alise, and are attacked by Mangler. Scully defeats Mangler, but Odette is unable to break Alise's prison. Alise finally speaks up, telling Odette to destroy the Forbidden Arts' crystal. When Odette is unable to, Scully jumps onto the crystal, sacrificing himself to destroy the Forbidden Arts. In the ensuing explosion Alise is freed from her prison unharmed, and she calls out to Odette: "Mommy". The film ends with everyone celebrating the presentation of Princess Alise to the kingdom. A statue of Scully is erected on the castle's garden.

== Cast ==
- Laura Bailey as Princess Odette (credited as Elle Deets)
  - Kathryn S. Hill as singing voice
- Yuri Lowenthal as Prince Derek and Scullion #4 (uncredited)
  - David Osmond as singing voice
- Jennifer Miller as Queen Uberta
  - Jan Broberg as singing voice
- Joseph Medrano as Lord Rogers and Scully
- David Lodge as The Forbidden Arts
- Clayton James Mackay as Jean-Bob
- Gardner Jass as Puffin
- Doug Stone as Speed
  - Joel Bishop as singing voice
- Joey Lotsko as Bromley and Mangler
- Jeff Michaels as Cutter
- Kirk Thornton as Jojo
- Brian Nissen as Brodie and Ferdinand
- Catherine Lavine as Bridget and Narrator
- Carly G. Fogelson as Princess Alise

== Songs ==
- "We Wanna Hear from You"
- "Get the Job Done!"
- "Always with You"
- "Right Where I Belong" (end credits)

== Sequels ==
A sixth and seventh film were announced, and were released in 2016 and 2017 respectively.
