= Loop bin duplicator =

A loop bin duplicator is a specialized audio tape machine used in the duplication of pre-recorded audio cassettes and 8-track cartridges.

Digital loop bin duplicators were first introduced in the early 1990s. They had fewer moving parts than previous systems, so were more reliable to operate.

== Analog loop bin duplicator ==
An analog loop bin uses a long loop of either 1/2" wide (for cassette duplication) or 1" wide (for 8-track tape duplication) loaded in a large bin located in the front of the duplicator. This loop master tape is loaded into the duplicator's bin from a traditional open-reel of tape, where the program material has been recorded to it using a studio-type multitrack tape recorder in real-time beforehand. The loop tape for cassette duplication has 4 tracks on the loop bin master tape (2 stereo tracks for Side A recorded in one direction, and the other 2 for Side B recorded in the opposite direction), and for 8-tracks has all of the 8 tracks (4 2-track stereo programs) recorded in one direction. The loop-bin master tape is read by the duplicator at a very high speed. For cassettes, either 32, 64, 80, or 100 times the normal speed of playback (1.875 ips) of an audio cassette (60, 120, 150, and 187.5 ips respectively) is used, and 10 or 20 times the normal speed of playback (3.75 ips) is used for 8-track duplication (37.50 and 75 ips respectively).

While this loop is being played back, the audio signals for the A and B side (or all 4 programs for 8-track) are sent to a "slave" recorder or an audio bus that contains multiple "slaves". The "slave" records from the loop bin master tape the 4 tracks for both A and B sides to an open-faced "pancake" reel (similar to motion picture film wound on a plastic core) of raw 1/8" audio tape (for cassettes), or all 8 tape tracks to back-lubricated 1/4" audio tape (for 8-track cartridges) also wound on a "pancake" reel, at the same high speed. After it is recorded, this pancake of tape is then loaded onto special machines called loaders. For cassettes, the loader has cassette shells containing only a leader called "C-0" cassettes that are loaded one at a time or into a hopper where the C-0s are fed automatically, depending on the type of loader. The tape from the pancake is then spliced onto the C-0 cassette's leader and then wound into the cassette by the loader. For 8-tracks, the tape is wound from the slave recorder onto a device mounted on its side, called a "sidewinder", which holds several small reels, and extracts and winds the tape from the slave recorder onto each reel into an endless-loop configuration (with the tape being pulled from the center of the wind), where each full reel is then placed in an empty 8-track cartridge and spliced together, either by machine or by hand, with a foil splice that holds the loop together. The foil splice also serves to automatically engage an 8-track player to advance to the next program when played.

The loop of tape in the duplicator's bin usually will have a segment of clear leader spliced in between the beginning and end of the tape loop (with some duplicators using a metal foil splice instead). This clear leader splice is read by an optical sensor (or in the case of a foil splice, coming in contact with electrical contacts in the tape path) in the loop bin duplicator, which triggers a cue tone that is recorded to the reel of pancake tape. This cue tone is read by the loader, and engages it, for cassettes, to stop and cut the tape from the pancake and either splice it to the leader in the C-0 cassette shell, or for 8-tracks, to disengage winding to an internal cartridge reel on the "sidewinder" mechanism and then cut the tape (a process for both types of media called "de-spooling"), with the winding resuming to a new reel afterwards. In fact, part of this de-spooling tone (also known as a "tailor tone" or "trigger tone") can be heard at the leader splice or foil splice of some previously recorded audio cassettes and 8-tracks respectively, as a very low-frequency arpeggiated rumbling of about 20 Hertz, sounding similar to how "motorboating" sounds with a radio or audio amplifier affected by such, but as an actual higher-frequency tone when played back at a higher speed (as it was when recorded to the tape at high speed during duplication).

In the XDR duplication process for audio cassettes, the loop bin duplicators use 1"-wide loop tape instead (like what is used for 8-track duplication), yielding in a better quality duplication.

== Digital loop bin duplicator ==
Digital loop bins were also introduced in the early 1990s. The early digital loop bins replaced the source tape with audio data stored on hard drives that was read and sent to digital-to-analog converters that were connected to the "slave" recorders, but they were prone to failure because of the amount of stress put on the hard disks.

The hard disks were replaced by huge RAM buffers, which eliminated the failures but added greatly to the expense of the equipment. Since a digital bin was capable of playback speeds of 256:1 or better, a single bin could perform as two by splitting the buffer between two different programs. A program could be loaded and looped for production, while an additional program could be loaded into the buffer. A real-time monitoring system could play back the audio stored in either buffer to check for potential flaws in the audio while both programs were looping for production.

Another difficulty to overcome was the means for loading a digital bin. A bin could be loaded manually by recording directly into the bin's buffer, or it could be loaded by a high-speed data device. At the time digital bins were first put into production, an S-VHS based storage device manufactured by Honeywell called a VLDS (Very Large Data Store) was used. A single S-VHS tape was capable of storing over 5 GB of data. These extremely expensive storage devices were eventually replaced by CD loading.

The benefits of using a digital loop bin are:

- There is no master tape to degrade during the copying process
- Only a single master has to be made
- Audio can be transferred at a much higher rate
- The audio being reproduced can be monitored during production without shutting down the bin
- Eliminates tape hiss from the source tape

The disadvantages:

- Initial cost
- Flaws in a recording would result in loud pops and cracks rather than a more subtle analog degradation.
- Generated a lot of heat and could start to overheat if not properly air-conditioned.
