= Richard Rich (filmmaker) =

American film director

- Born: Richard James Rich
- Occupations: film director, producer, screenwriter, animator
- Years active: 1972–present
- Employer: Walt Disney Animation Studios (1972–1986)
- Notable work: The Fox and the Hound; The Black Cauldron; The Swan Princess series The King and I The Scarecrow; Alpha and Omega series

Richard James Rich is an American director, producer, and screenwriter.

== Biography ==
Rich is the founder and owner of Crest Animation Productions. Rich started his career in the mailroom of the Walt Disney Studios in 1972 and would give piano lessons during lunch breaks. He was chosen by John Lounsbery to be an assistant director for Winnie the Pooh and Tigger Too based on his musical expertise. He made his directorial debut on The Fox and the Hound.

After leaving Disney in 1986, Rich established Rich Animation Studios, later renamed RichCrest. He directed The Swan Princess in 1994 and its eleven sequels.

Besides feature films, Rich has produced direct-to-video series such as Animated Stories from the New Testament, Animated Stories from the Bible, Animated Stories from the Book of Mormon, Animated Hero Classics, and K10C: Kids' Ten Commandments. His more recent credits include acting as producer on the animated film Alpha and Omega and as the director/producer of its sequels.

== Filmography ==
Year	Film	Director	Producer	Writer	Other	Notes
1974	Winnie the Pooh and Tigger Too				Assistant Director	
1977	The Many Adventures of Winnie the Pooh				Assistant Director	
1977	The Rescuers				Assistant Director	
1977	Pete's Dragon				Assistant Animation Director	
1978	The Small One				Assistant Director; Songwriter: "A Friendly Face"	Short film
1981	The Fox and the Hound	X mark			Songwriter: "Goodbye May Seem Forever"	
1985	The Black Cauldron	X mark		X mark		
1994	The Swan Princess	X mark	X mark	X mark		
1997	The Swan Princess: Escape from Castle Mountain	X mark	X mark	X mark		Limited theatrical release
1998	The Swan Princess III: The Mystery of the Enchanted Treasure	X mark	X mark	X mark		Direct-to-video
1999	The King and I	X mark				
2000	The Scarecrow	X mark	X mark	X mark		Direct-to-video
2001	The Trumpet of the Swan	X mark	X mark			
2002	Muhammad: The Last Prophet	X mark	X mark			Limited Theatrical Release
2006	Arthur's Missing Pal		X mark			Limited Theatrical Release
2009	Happily N'Ever After 2		X mark			Direct-to-video
2010	Alpha and Omega		X mark			
2011	The Little Engine That Could		X mark			Direct-to-video
2012	The Swan Princess: Christmas	X mark	X mark			Direct-to-video
2013	Alpha and Omega 2: A Howl-iday Adventure	X mark	X mark		Story (Uncredited)	Direct-to-video
2014	The Swan Princess: A Royal Family Tale	X mark	X mark	X mark	Story	Direct-to-video
2014	Alpha and Omega 3: The Great Wolf Games	X mark	X mark			Direct-to-video
2014	Alpha and Omega 4: The Legend of the Saw Tooth Cave	X mark	X mark			Limited Theatrical Release
2015	Alpha and Omega: Family Vacation	X mark	X mark			Direct-to-video
2016	The Swan Princess: Princess Tomorrow, Pirate Today!	X mark	X mark			Direct-to-video
2017	The Swan Princess: Royally Undercover	X mark	X mark			Direct-to-video
2018	The Swan Princess: A Royal Myztery	X mark	X mark			Direct-to-video
2019	The Swan Princess: Kingdom of Music	X mark	X mark			Direct-to-video
2020	The Swan Princess: A Royal Wedding	X mark	X mark			Direct-to-video
2023	The Swan Princess: A Fairy Tale is Born	X mark	X mark	X mark	Story	Direct-to-video
2023	The Swan Princess: Far Longer than Forever	X mark	X mark	X mark	Story	Direct-to-video

== See also ==
- Don Bluth
- 20th Century Fox Animation Studios
- Threshold Entertainment
