= Lex de Azevedo =

American songwriter

- Born: Alexis King de Azevedo; January 14, 1943 (age 83); Los Angeles, California, U.S.
- Occupations: Composer, musician, songwriter
- Spouse(s): Linda Jan Carter (divorced 1994); Peggy Davis (divorced); Roseângela de Azevedo
- Children: 10, including Emilie Brown and Rachel Coleman
- Parent(s): Alyce King Clarke (mother/deceased), Sydney de Azevedo (biological father/deceased), Robert Clarke (stepfather/deceased)
- Family: Cam Clarke (half-brother)

Alexis King de Azevedo (born January 14, 1943) is an American composer, songwriter, and pianist known primarily for his film scores and his work on The Swan Princess of which one of his songs was nominated for a Golden Globe Award. De Azevedo, a member of The Church of Jesus Christ of Latter-day Saints, also produced the music for the LDS musical Saturday's Warrior.

== Biography ==
Lex de Azevedo was born in Los Angeles, the son of Alyce King of the King Sisters by her first marriage. He served as a musical director for The Sonny & Cher Show, Michael Jackson and the Jackson Five and the Osmonds. He composed the scores for the films Where the Red Fern Grows (1974), Against a Crooked Sky (1975), Baker's Hawk (1976), Brigham (1977) and The Swan Princess (1994), for the latter he was nominated for a Golden Globe in 1995 for the song "Far Longer than Forever".

During the 1960s, De Azevedo produced several albums for Capitol Records, including Laurindo Almeida's Plays for a Man and a Woman and the Four King Cousins' Introducing the Four King Cousins.

He produced the hit version, by the Youngstown, Ohio-based quartet the Human Beinz, of the Isley Brothers' "Nobody but Me", which rose to #8 in 1968. He composed for pop singers (including many members of his own family) and the stage.

He is also credited as the co-writer of the Latter-day Saint production, Saturday's Warrior.

De Azevedo has ten children. His daughters Rachel and Emilie are the creators and producers of the Signing Time! videos, designed to teach children American Sign Language, and he appears in them during the grandparents sequence of Vol. 2. De Azevedo's daughter Julie de Azevedo Hanks is a former Latter-day Saint. She was inspirational pop singer. She is also a psychologist who owns and runs Wasatch Family Therapy.

== Discography ==
- Mountains (Aubergine, 1991)
- Moab (Aubergine, 1993)
- Variations On A Sacred Theme (Shadow Mountain, 1998)
- Variations On A Sacred Theme, Vol. 2 (Shadow Mountain, 1999)
- A Time To Love (Embryo, 2006)

Lex de Azevedo has also recorded hundreds of instrumental versions of popular songs. These were intended for airplay on beautiful music radio stations and were not released commercially. These tracks are a mainstay on the SiriusXM channel Escape, which usually plays at least one of de Azevedo's recordings each hour. They have been made available for download at Surrey House Music's website and also on YouTube.

== Filmography ==
=== Films ===
Year	Title	Role	Notes
1994	The Swan Princess	Sir Rothbart (singing voice)	Voice
1998	The Swan Princess: Sing Along	Sir Rothbart	Short; Voice
2014	Signing Time! Christmas	Christmas Party Guest	Short

=== Television ===
Year	Title	Role	Notes
2002	Signing Time!	—N/a	1 episode

== See also ==
- LDS fiction
- My Turn on Earth
