= List of American children's films =

This is a list of American films primarily marketed to children.

== 1910s ==
1918

- The Blue Bird

== 1920s ==
1920

- Pollyanna

1924

- Peter Pan

1925

- A Kiss for Cinderella
- Wizard of Oz

== 1930s ==
1933

- Alice in Wonderland

1934

- Babes in Toyland

1935

- The Littlest Rebel

1936

- Little Lord Fauntleroy

1937

- Heidi
- Wee Willie Winkie
- Snow White and the Seven Dwarfs

1938

- The Adventures of Tom Sawyer
- Rebecca of Sunnybrook Farm

1939

- Gulliver's Travels
- The Little Princess
- The Wizard of Oz

== 1940s ==
1940

- The Blue Bird
- Pinocchio

1941

- Dumbo
- Mr. Bug Goes to Town

1942

- Bambi
- The Jungle Book
- Saludos Amigos

1943

- Lassie Come Home
- My Friend Flicka

1944

- National Velvet

1945

- The Enchanted Forest
- Son of Lassie

1946

- Courage of Lassie
- Song of the South
- The Yearling

1947

- Fun and Fancy Free

1948

- The Boy with Green Hair
- Hills of Home
- So Dear to My Heart

1949

- Challenge to Lassie
- The Secret Garden
- The Sun Comes Up

== 1950s ==
1950

- Cinderella
- The Great Rupert
- Kim
- Treasure Island

1951

- Alice in Wonderland
- The Painted Hills
- Superman and the Mole Men

1952

- Aladdin and His Lamp
- Hans Christian Andersen
- Jack and the Beanstalk
- The Story of Robin Hood and His Merrie Men

1953

- The 5,000 Fingers of Dr. T.
- Confidentially Connie
- Little Fugitive
- Peter Pan
- Rob Roy: The Highland Rogue
- The Sword and the Rose

1954

- 20,000 Leagues Under the Sea
- Return to Treasure Island

1955

- The Court Jester
- Davy Crockett, King of the Wild Frontier
- Lady and the Tramp
- The Littlest Outlaw
- A Man Called Peter

1956

- The Brave One
- Davy Crockett and the River Pirates

1957

- Johnny Tremain
- Old Yeller

1958

- The 7th Voyage of Sinbad
- The Light in the Forest
- Tonka

1959

- 1001 Arabian Nights
- Darby O'Gill and the Little People
- A Dog of Flanders
- The Shaggy Dog
- Sleeping Beauty

== 1960s ==
1960

- The Adventures of Huckleberry Finn
- The Boy and the Pirates
- The Hound That Thought He Was a Raccoon
- Kidnapped
- Pollyanna
- Swiss Family Robinson
- Ten Who Dared
- Those Calloways
- Toby Tyler

1961

- The Absent-Minded Professor
- Babes in Toyland
- Boy Who Caught a Crook
- Greyfriars Bobby
- The Legend of Lobo
- Misty
- Mysterious Island
- Nikki, Wild Dog of the North
- One Hundred and One Dalmatians
- The Parent Trap
- Snow White and the Three Stooges
- Tomboy and the Champ

1962

- Big Red
- Gay Purr-ee
- In Search of the Castaways
- Jack the Giant Killer
- The Magic Sword
- The Wonderful World of the Brothers Grimm

1963

- Captain Sindbad
- The Courtship of Eddie's Father
- Flipper
- The Incredible Journey
- Jason and the Argonauts
- Lassie's Great Adventure
- Miracle of the White Stallions
- Savage Sam
- Son of Flubber
- Spencer's Mountain
- Summer Magic
- The Sword in the Stone
- The Three Lives of Thomasina
- When the Cat Comes

1964

- Dear Heart
- Emil and the Detectives
- Flipper's New Adventure
- Hey There, It's Yogi Bear!
- Island of the Blue Dolphins
- Mary Poppins
- The Misadventures of Merlin Jones
- The Moon-Spinners
- The Three Lives of Thomasina
- A Tiger Walks

1965

- Clarence, the Cross-Eyed Lion
- Funny Things Happen Down Under
- Gulliver's Travels Beyond the Moon
- Lemon Grove Kids Meet the Monsters
- The Magic World of Topo Gigio
- The Man from Button Willow
- That Darn Cat!
- Those Calloways
- Willy McBean and His Magic Machine
- Zebra in the Kitchen

1966

- The Christmas That Almost Wasn't
- The Daydreamer
- The Fighting Prince of Donegal
- Follow Me, Boys!
- The Great St. Trinian's Train Robbery
- Jimmy, the Boy Wonder
- The Magic Serpent
- The Man Called Flintstone
- Namu, the Killer Whale
- Thunderbirds Are Go
- The Ugly Dachshund

1967

- The Adventures of Bullwhip Griffin
- Brighty of the Grand Canyon
- Charlie, the Lonesome Cougar
- Doctor Dolittle
- The Gnome Mobile
- The Happiest Millionaire
- The Heathens of Kummerow
- Jack and the Beanstalk
- The Jungle Book
- Monkeys, Go Home!
- The Wacky World of Mother Goose

1968

- Blackbeard's Ghost
- Chitty Chitty Bang Bang
- Heidi
- The Horse in the Gray Flannel Suit
- The Love Bug
- Never a Dull Moment
- Oliver!
- The One and Only, Genuine, Original Family Band
- Robby
- Thunderbird 6
- The World of Hans Christian Andersen

1969

- The Adventures of Goopy and Bagha
- A Boy Named Charlie Brown
- Captain Nemo and the Underwater City
- The Computer Wore Tennis Shoes
- Godzilla's Revenge
- Kes
- My Side of the Mountain
- Rascal
- Run Wild, Run Free
- Tintin and the Temple of the Sun
- The Wonderful World of Puss 'n Boots

== 1970s ==
1970

- The Aristocats
- King of the Grizzlies
- The Phantom Tollbooth
- Pufnstuf
- Santa and the Three Bears
- The Wild Country

1971

- The Barefoot Executive
- Bedknobs and Broomsticks
- A Christmas Carol
- Here Comes Peter Cottontail
- The Million Dollar Duck
- The Point!
- Willy Wonka & the Chocolate Factory

1972

- The Biscuit Eater
- Justin Morgan Had a Horse
- Napoleon and Samantha
- Now You See Him, Now You Don't
- Oliver and the Artful Dodger
- Santa and the Ice Cream Bunny
- Snoopy Come Home
- Snowball Express
- Sounder

1973

- Charley and the Angel
- Charlotte's Web
- From the Mixed-Up Files of Mrs. Basil E. Frankweiler
- One Little Indian
- Robin Hood
- Tom Sawyer
- The World's Greatest Athlete

1974

- Benji
- Castaway Cowboy
- Herbie Rides Again
- The Island at the Top of the World
- Journey Back to Oz
- The Little Prince
- Where the Lilies Bloom
- Where the Red Fern Grows
- Winnie the Pooh and Tigger Too

1975

- Against a Crooked Sky
- The Adventures of the Wilderness Family
- The Apple Dumpling Gang
- Escape to Witch Mountain
- One of Our Dinosaurs Is Missing
- Ride a Wild Pony
- The Strongest Man in the World
- Tubby the Tuba

1976

- Across the Great Divide
- Bugsy Malone
- Escape from the Dark
- Freaky Friday
- Gus
- Let the Balloon Go
- No Deposit, No Return
- The Shaggy D.A.
- The Slipper and the Rose
- The Smurfs and the Magic Flute
- Storm Boy
- Treasure of Matecumbe
- The Twelve Tasks of Asterix

1977

- The Billion Dollar Hobo
- Blue Fire Lady
- Candleshoe
- Dot and the Kangaroo
- For the Love of Benji
- The Glitterball
- Gulliver's Travels
- Herbie Goes to Monte Carlo
- The Hobbit
- The Many Adventures of Winnie the Pooh
- The Mouse and His Child
- Pete's Dragon
- The Prince and the Pauper
- Race for Your Life, Charlie Brown
- Raggedy Ann & Andy: A Musical Adventure
- The Rescuers
- Return to Boggy Creek
- Wombling Free

1978

- Candleshoe
- Casey's Shadow
- The Cat from Outer Space
- The Further Adventures of the Wilderness Family
- Hot Lead and Cold Feet
- International Velvet
- The Magic of Lassie
- Return From Witch Mountain
- Sammy's Super T-Shirt
- The Sea Gypsies
- The Water Babies

1979

- The Black Stallion
- The Bugs Bunny/Road Runner Movie
- C.H.O.M.P.S.
- Mountain Family Robinson
- The North Avenue Irregulars
- Scooby Goes Hollywood
- Unidentified Flying Oddball

== 1980s ==
1980

- Bon Voyage, Charlie Brown (and Don't Come Back!!)
- The Last Flight of Noah's Ark
- Popeye
- The Return of the King: A Story of the Hobbits
- Yogi's First Christmas

1981

- The Fox and the Hound
- The Looney Looney Looney Bugs Bunny Movie
- Revenge of the Mysterons from Mars

1982

- Annie
- Bugs Bunny's 3rd Movie: 1001 Rabbit Tales
- E.T. the Extra-Terrestrial
- The Flight of Dragons
- Heidi's Song
- The Last Unicorn
- Mighty Mouse in the Great Space Chase
- The Secret of NIMH

1983

- The Black Stallion Returns
- Daffy Duck's Fantastic Island
- Dot and the Bunny
- Twice Upon a Time
- Where the Toys Come From

1984

- Caravan of Courage: An Ewok Adventure
- Gallavants
- The NeverEnding Story

1985

- The Adventures of Mark Twain
- The Black Cauldron
- The Care Bears Movie
- D.A.R.Y.L.
- The Dirt Bike Kid
- He-Man and She-Ra: The Secret of the Sword
- Here Come the Littles
- The Peanut Butter Solution
- Rainbow Brite and the Star Stealer
- Sesame Street Presents Follow That Bird
- Star Fairies

1986

- The Adventures of the American Rabbit
- An American Tail
- Babes in Toyland
- Care Bears Movie II: A New Generation
- Flight of the Navigator
- GoBots: Battle of the Rock Lords
- The Great Mouse Detective
- Heathcliff: The Movie
- Lightning, the White Stallion
- My Little Pony: The Movie
- SpaceCamp
- The Transformers: The Movie

1987

- Batteries Not Included
- Benji the Hunted
- The Brave Little Toaster
- The Care Bears Adventure in Wonderland
- The Chipmunk Adventure
- The Garbage Pail Kids Movie
- G.I. Joe: The Movie
- Harry and the Hendersons
- The Jetsons Meet the Flintstones
- Pinocchio and the Emperor of the Night
- The Puppetoon Movie
- Scooby-Doo Meets the Boo Brothers
- The Secret Garden
- Top Cat and the Beverly Hills Cats
- Yogi Bear and the Magical Flight of the Spruce Goose
- Yogi's Great Escape

1988

- BraveStarr: The Movie
- Daffy Duck's Quackbusters
- Felix the Cat: The Movie
- The Good, the Bad, and Huckleberry Hound
- The Land Before Time
- Mac and Me
- The New Adventures of Pippi Longstocking
- Oliver & Company
- Pound Puppies and the Legend of Big Paw
- Purple People Eater
- Rockin' with Judy Jetson
- Scooby-Doo and the Ghoul School
- Scooby-Doo! and the Reluctant Werewolf
- Yogi and the Invasion of the Space Bears

1989

- All Dogs Go to Heaven
- Cheetah
- The Little Mermaid
- Little Monsters
- Little Nemo: Adventures in Slumberland
- Prancer
- The Wizard

== 1990s ==
1990

- Courage Mountain
- DuckTales the Movie: Treasure of the Lost Lamp
- The Fool of the World and the Flying Ship
- A Gnome Named Gnorm
- Home Alone
- Jetsons: The Movie
- A Mom for Christmas
- The NeverEnding Story II: The Next Chapter
- The Rescuers Down Under
- Shipwrecked
- The Witches
- Problem Child
- Teenage Mutant Ninja Turtles

1991

- Adventures in Dinosaur City
- And You Thought Your Parents Were Weird
- An American Tail: Fievel Goes West
- Beauty and the Beast
- Bingo
- Ernest Scared Stupid
- The Giant of Thunder Mountain
- In the Nick of Time
- Perfect Harmony
- Rock-a-Doodle
- The Seventh Brother
- Teenage Mutant Ninja Turtles II: The Secret of the Ooze

1992

- 3 Ninjas
- Adventures in Dinosaur City
- Aladdin
- Alan and Naomi
- Beauty and the Beast
- Beethoven
- Blinky Bill
- The Boy and the King
- FernGully: The Last Rainforest
- Freddie as F.R.O.7
- Home Alone 2: Lost in New York
- The Mighty Ducks
- Munchie
- Porco Rosso
- Split Infinity
- The Three Musketeers
- Tiny Toon Adventures: How I Spent My Vacation
- To Grandmother's House We Go
- Tom and Jerry: The Movie

1993

- The Adventures of Huck Finn
- Beethoven's 2nd
- Dennis the Menace
- Digger
- A Far Off Place
- Free Willy
- Happily Ever After
- Hocus Pocus
- Homeward Bound: The Incredible Journey
- Kid Cop
- Little Miss Millions
- Magic Kid
- Me and the Kid
- Mr. Nanny
- The Nutcracker
- Once Upon a Forest
- Prehysteria!
- Rigoletto
- Rookie of the Year
- Sailor Moon R: The Movie
- The Secret Garden
- The Silver Brumby
- Batman: Mask of the Phantasm
- Sinbad
- The Three Musketeers
- We're Back! A Dinosaur's Story
- Wind Dancer
- Teenage Mutant Ninja Turtles III

1994

- 3 Ninjas Kick Back
- Andre
- Angels in the Outfield
- Asterix Conquers America
- Baby's Day Out
- Black Beauty
- Blank Check
- Camp Nowhere
- Cinderella
- D2: The Mighty Ducks
- Dragonworld
- Getting Even With Dad
- Iron Will
- Jock of the Bushveld
- The Jungle Book
- The Land Before Time II: The Great Valley Adventure
- Lassie
- The Lion King
- Little Big League
- Little Giants
- The Little Rascals
- Magic Kid 2
- Miracle on 34th Street
- Monkey Trouble
- Munchie Strikes Back
- My Girl 2
- The NeverEnding Story III
- No Worries
- The Pagemaster
- Pet Shop
- Pocahontas
- Pom Poko
- Prehysteria! 2
- The Return of Jafar
- Richie Rich
- The Santa Clause
- Scooby-Doo! in Arabian Nights
- The Secret of Roan Inish
- The Shaggy Dog
- The Swan Princess
- Thumbelina
- Trading Mom
- A Troll in Central Park
- War of the Buttons
- White Fang 2: Myth of the White Wolf

1995

- 3 Ninjas Knuckle Up
- The Amazing Panda Adventure
- Babe
- The Baby-Sitters Club
- Balto
- The Big Green
- Born to Be Wild
- Bushwhacked
- Casper
- Catnapped!
- Escape to Witch Mountain
- Far from Home: The Adventures of Yellow Dog
- Fluke
- Free Willy 2: The Adventure Home
- Friendship's Field
- Gargoyles the Movie: The Heroes Awaken
- Gold Diggers: The Secret of Bear Mountain
- A Goofy Movie
- Gordy
- Gumby: The Movie
- Heavyweights
- Here Come the Munsters
- The Indian in the Cupboard
- It Takes Two
- Jonny Quest vs. The Cyber Insects
- Jumanji
- A Kid in King Arthur's Court
- The Land Before Time III: The Time of the Great Giving
- A Little Princess
- Little Red Riding Hood
- Magic Island
- Magic in the Water
- Man of the House
- Mighty Morphin Power Rangers: The Movie
- Monster Mash
- Napoleon
- The Pebble and the Penguin
- Pocahontas
- Sailor Moon Super S: The Movie
- The Tale of Tillie's Dragon
- Three Wishes
- Toy Story
- The White Balloon

1996

- 101 Dalmatians
- The Adventures of Pinocchio
- Aladdin and the King of Thieves
- Alaska
- All Dogs Go to Heaven 2
- Body Troopers
- Bogus
- Clubhouse Detectives
- D3: The Mighty Ducks
- Dunston Checks In
- Ed
- First Kid
- Flipper
- Forest Warrior
- Harriet the Spy
- Homeward Bound II: Lost in San Francisco
- House Arrest
- James and the Giant Peach
- Kazaam
- The Land Before Time IV: Journey Through the Mists
- The Last Home Run
- Matilda
- My Friend Joe
- The Paper Brigade
- Rainbow
- Sabrina the Teenage Witch
- Santa With Muscles
- Shiloh
- Space Jam
- Susie Q
- The Wind in the Willows
- Wish Upon a Star

1997

- Air Bud
- Anastasia
- Angels in the Endzone
- Beauty and the Beast: The Enchanted Christmas
- The Borrowers
- The Brave Little Toaster to the Rescue
- Buddy
- Casper: A Spirited Beginning
- Cats Don't Dance
- A Christmas Carol
- Cinderella
- FairyTale: A True Story
- The Fearless Four
- Free Willy 3: The Rescue
- George of the Jungle
- Good Burger
- Hercules
- Home Alone 3
- The Land Before Time V: The Mysterious Island
- MouseHunt
- Mr. Magoo
- Northern Lights
- Oliver Twist
- Paws
- Pippi Longstocking
- Pooh's Grand Adventure: The Search for Christopher Robin
- RocketMan
- The Second Jungle Book: Mowgli & Baloo
- A Simple Wish
- The Swan Princess II: Escape from Castle Mountain
- That Darn Cat
- Turbo: A Power Rangers Movie
- Under Wraps
- Warriors of Virtue
- The Wiggles Movie
- Zeus and Roxanne

1998

- 3 Ninjas: High Noon at Mega Mountain
- Air Bud: Golden Receiver
- An All Dogs Christmas Carol
- An American Tail: The Treasure of Manhattan Island
- Babe: Pig in the City
- Baby Huey's Great Easter Adventure
- Barney's Great Adventure
- Beauty and the Beast: Belle's Magical World
- Billboard Dad
- The Brave Little Toaster Goes to Mars
- A Bug's Life
- Casper Meets Wendy
- Dennis the Menace Strikes Again
- FernGully 2: The Magical Rescue
- The First Snow of Winter
- Halloweentown
- Hercules and Xena – The Animated Movie: The Battle for Mount Olympus
- Hercules: Zero to Hero
- I'll Be Home for Christmas
- Jack Frost
- The Land Before Time VI: The Secret of Saurus Rock
- The Lion King II: Simba's Pride
- Madeline
- Meet the Deedles
- The Mighty Kong
- Mulan
- My Date with the President's Daughter
- Noah
- The Parent Trap
- Paulie
- Pocahontas II: Journey to a New World
- The Prince of Egypt
- Quest for Camelot
- Rudolph the Red-Nosed Reindeer: The Movie
- The Rugrats Movie
- Rusty: A Dog's Tale
- Safety Patrol
- Scooby-Doo on Zombie Island
- The Secret of NIMH 2: Timmy to the Rescue
- Slappy and the Stinkers
- Star Kid
- Summer of the Monkeys
- The Swan Princess: The Mystery of the Enchanted Kingdom
- Wide Awake
- The Wonderful Ice Cream Suit
- You Lucky Dog

1999

- The Adventures of Elmo in Grouchland
- Alvin and the Chipmunks Meet Frankenstein
- Animal Farm
- Annie
- Bartok the Magnificent
- Belle's Tales of Friendship
- Can of Worms
- A Dog of Flanders
- Don't Look Under the Bed
- Doug's 1st Movie
- Durango Kids
- Genius
- Horse Sense
- I'll Remember April
- Inspector Gadget
- The Iron Giant
- Johnny Tsunami
- Madeline: Lost in Paris
- My Brother the Pig
- The New Adventures of Pinocchio
- Nico the Unicorn
- The Nuttiest Nutcracker
- Passport to Paris
- Pirates of the Plain
- The Prince and the Surfer
- Running Free
- Scooby-Doo! and the Witch's Ghost
- Secret of the Andes
- Shiloh 2: Shiloh Season
- Smart House
- Stuart Little
- Switching Goals
- Tarzan
- The Thirteenth Year
- Tom's Midnight Garden
- Toy Story 2
- Wakko's Wish
- Zenon: Girl of the 21st Century

== 2000s ==
2000

- 102 Dalmatians
- Air Bud: World Pup
- Alvin and the Chipmunks Meet the Wolfman
- Beethoven's 3rd
- Blue's Big Musical Movie
- Can't Be Heaven
- Casper's Haunted Christmas
- Chicken Run
- The Color of Friendship
- Dinosaur
- Dr. Seuss' How the Grinch Stole Christmas
- The Emperor's New Groove
- Escape to Grizzly Mountain
- An Extremely Goofy Movie
- The Flintstones in Viva Rock Vegas
- Franklin and the Green Knight
- Grandma Got Run Over by a Reindeer
- Joseph: King of Dreams
- The Land Before Time VII: The Stone of Cold Fire
- The Life & Adventures of Santa Claus
- Life-Size
- The Little Mermaid II: Return to the Sea
- The Little Vampire
- Mermaid
- Miracle in Lane 2
- Mom's Got a Date with a Vampire
- Monster Mash
- My Dog Skip
- Once Upon a Christmas
- The Other Me
- Our Lips Are Sealed
- Phantom of the Megaplex
- Quints
- Ready to Run
- The Road to El Dorado
- Rugrats in Paris: The Movie
- Running Free
- The Scarecrow
- Scooby-Doo and the Alien Invaders
- Seventeen Again
- Stepsister from Planet Weird
- A Summer Tale
- The Tangerine Bear
- Thomas and the Magic Railroad
- The Tigger Movie
- Titan A.E.
- Tom Sawyer
- Tweety's High Flying Adventure
- Up, Up and Away

2001

- Atlantis: The Lost Empire
- Back to the Secret Garden
- Barbie in the Nutcracker
- Beethoven's 4th
- The Book of Pooh: Stories from the Heart
- Cats & Dogs
- Dr. Dolittle 2
- The Flintstones: On the Rocks
- Franklin's Magic Christmas
- Halloweentown II: Kalabar's Revenge
- The Happy Cricket
- Harry Potter and the Philosopher's Stone
- Holiday in the Sun
- Hounded
- The Jar: A Tale from the East
- The Jennie Project
- Jimmy Neutron: Boy Genius
- Jumping Ship
- Kingdom Come
- Lady and the Tramp II: Scamp's Adventure
- The Land Before Time VIII: The Big Freeze
- The Little Bear Movie
- The Luck of the Irish
- Marco Polo: Return to Xanadu
- Max Keeble's Big Move
- Monsters, Inc.
- Motocrossed
- MVP: Most Vertical Primate
- My Life as McDull
- Osmosis Jones
- The Poof Point
- Recess: School's Out
- Rugrats: All Growed Up
- Scooby-Doo and the Cyber Chase
- See Spot Run
- Shrek
- Spy Kids
- The Trumpet of the Swan
- 'Twas the Night
- Voyage of the Unicorn
- Winning London

2002

- The Adventures of Tom Thumb and Thumbelina
- The Archies in JugMan
- Balto II: Wolf Quest
- Barbie as Rapunzel
- Big Fat Liar
- Carol's Journey
- Catch That Girl
- The Cat Returns
- Cinderella II: Dreams Come True
- The Climb
- Clockstoppers
- The Country Bears
- Dennis the Menace: Cruise Control
- Double Teamed
- Elina: As If I Wasn't There
- Falling Sky
- Get a Clue
- Getting There
- Gotta Kick It Up!
- Grand Champion
- Groove Squad
- Harry Potter and the Chamber of Secrets
- Hey Arnold!: The Movie
- Home Alone 4
- The Hunchback of Notre Dame II
- Ice Age
- Jonah: A VeggieTales Movie
- Kermit's Swamp Years
- The Land Before Time IX: Journey to Big Water
- Like Mike
- Lilo & Stitch
- Pinocchio
- The Powerpuff Girls Movie
- The Princess and the Pea
- Return to Never Land
- A Ring of Endless Light
- The Rookie
- Sabrina: Friends Forever
- The Santa Clause 2
- Scooby-Doo
- The Scream Team
- Snow Dogs
- Spirit: Stallion of the Cimarron
- Spy Kids 2: The Island of Lost Dreams
- Stuart Little 2
- Tarzan & Jane
- Thunderpants
- Tom and Jerry: The Magic Ring
- Tom and Thomas
- Treasure Planet
- Tru Confessions
- Tuck Everlasting
- Virginia's Run
- Whale Rider
- When in Rome
- The Wild Thornberrys Movie

2003

- 101 Dalmatians II: Patch's London Adventure
- Agent Cody Banks
- Air Bud: Spikes Back
- Atlantis: Milo's Return
- Barbie of Swan Lake
- Batman: Mystery of the Batwoman
- Beethoven's 5th
- Blizzard
- Brother Bear
- Caillou's Holiday Movie
- Captain Sabertooth
- Charlotte's Web 2: Wilbur's Great Adventure
- The Cat in the Hat
- The Challenge
- Eddie's Million Dollar Cook-Off
- Elf
- Finding Nemo
- Freaky Friday
- Full-Court Miracle
- The Ghost Club
- Good Boy!
- The Haunted Mansion
- Holes
- Hot Wheels World Race
- The Jungle Book 2
- Just for Kicks
- Kangaroo Jack
- Kim Possible Movie: A Sitch in Time
- The Land Before Time X: The Great Longneck Migration
- The Legend of Johnny Lingo
- A Light in the Forest
- Looney Tunes: Back in Action
- Maniac Magee
- Miss Spider's Sunny Patch Kids
- Peter Pan
- Piglet's Big Movie
- Quigley
- Recess: All Growed Down
- Recess: Taking the Fifth Grade
- Rescue Heroes: The Movie
- Right on Track
- Rugrats Go Wild
- Scooby-Doo! and the Legend of the Vampire
- Scooby-Doo! and the Monster of Mexico
- Secondhand Lions
- Sinbad: Legend of the Seven Seas
- Spy Kids 3-D: Game Over
- Stitch! The Movie
- The Story of the Weeping Camel
- What a Girl Wants
- When Zachary Beaver Came to Town
- Wondrous Oblivion
- The Wooden Camera
- You Wish!
- Young Black Stallion

2004

- Agent Cody Banks 2: Destination London
- Barbie as the Princess and the Pauper
- Care Bears: Journey to Joke-a-lot
- Catch That Kid
- Chestnut: Hero of Central Park
- Clifford's Really Big Movie
- Confessions of a Teenage Drama Queen
- The Dust Factory
- Ella Enchanted
- Fat Albert
- Funky Monkey
- Garfield: The Movie
- Going to the Mat
- Harry Potter and the Prisoner of Azkaban
- Home on the Range
- The Incredibles
- In Search of Santa
- Kangaroo Jack: G'Day U.S.A.!
- Lemony Snicket's A Series of Unfortunate Events
- The Lion King 1½
- Mickey's Twice Upon a Christmas
- Mulan II
- My Scene: Jammin' in Jamaica
- New York Minute
- The Polar Express
- The Princess Diaries 2: Royal Engagement
- Raise Your Voice
- Scooby-Doo! and the Loch Ness Monster
- Scooby-Doo 2: Monsters Unleashed
- Shark Tale
- Shrek 2
- Sleepover
- The SpongeBob SquarePants Movie
- Spookley the Square Pumpkin
- The Story of an African Farm
- Stuck in the Suburbs
- Teacher's Pet
- Thunderbirds
- Two Brothers
- The Winning Season
- Zenon: Z3

2005

- The Adventures of Sharkboy and Lavagirl in 3-D
- Aloha, Scooby-Doo!
- Arashi no Yoru ni
- Are We There Yet?
- Balto III: Wings of Change
- Bailey's Billion$
- Barbie and the Magic of Pegasus
- Barbie: Fairytopia
- The Batman vs. Dracula
- Because of Winn-Dixie
- The Blue Umbrella
- Bob the Butler
- Buffalo Dreams
- Candy Land: The Great Lollipop Adventure
- The Care Bears' Big Wish Movie
- Charlie and the Chocolate Factory
- Cheaper by the Dozen 2
- Chicken Little
- The Chronicles of Narnia: The Lion, the Witch and the Wardrobe
- Come Away Home
- Digital Monster X-Evolution
- Dinotopia: Quest for the Ruby Sunstone
- Down and Derby
- Duma
- The Golden Blaze
- The Happy Elf
- Harry Potter and the Goblet of Fire
- Heidi
- Hoodwinked!
- Hot Wheels AcceleRacers
- Kicking and Screaming
- Ice Princess
- Kim Possible Movie: So the Drama
- The Land Before Time XI: Invasion of the Tinysauruses
- Lassie
- Life Is Ruff
- Little Manhattan
- Madagascar
- The Magic Roundabout
- My Little Pony: A Very Minty Christmas
- My Scene Goes Hollywood
- Nanny McPhee
- Once Upon a Halloween
- Pooh's Heffalump Halloween Movie
- Pooh's Heffalump Movie
- Popstar
- The Proud Family Movie
- Racing Stripes
- Rebound
- Robots
- School's Out!: The Musical
- Scooby-Doo! in Where's My Mummy?
- Sky High
- Son of the Mask
- Stuart Little 3: Call of the Wild
- Tarzan II
- Tom and Jerry: Blast Off to Mars
- Tom and Jerry: The Fast and the Furry
- Valiant
- Wallace & Gromit: The Curse of the Were-Rabbit
- Zathura: A Space Adventure

2006

- The Adventures of Brer Rabbit
- Air Buddies
- Akeelah and the Bee
- The Ant Bully
- Aquamarine
- Arthur and the Invisibles
- Azur and Asmar
- Bambi II
- The Barbie Diaries
- Barbie in the 12 Dancing Princesses
- Barbie: Mermaidia
- Barnyard
- The Blue Elephant
- Bratz Genie Magic
- Brother Bear 2
- Cars
- Casper's Scare School
- Charlotte's Web
- A Christmas Carol
- Codename: Kids Next Door: Operation: Z.E.R.O
- Curious George
- Deck the Halls
- Dr. Dolittle 3
- Eragon
- Everyone's Hero
- Eye of the Dolphin
- Flicka
- Flushed Away
- The Fox and the Hound 2
- Franklin and the Turtle Lake Treasure
- Garfield: A Tail of Two Kitties
- Happy Feet
- Hearty Paws
- High School Musical
- Holly Hobbie and Friends: Christmas Wishes
- Holly Hobbie and Friends: Surprise Party
- Hoot
- How to Eat Fried Worms
- Ice Age: The Meltdown
- The Land Before Time XII: The Great Day of the Flyers
- The Legend of Sasquatch
- Leroy & Stitch
- Lotte from Gadgetville
- Miss Potter
- Monster House
- My Little Pony Crystal Princess: The Runaway Rainbow
- My Little Pony: The Princess Promenade
- Night at the Museum
- Open Season
- Over the Hedge
- PollyWorld
- The Prince and Me 2: The Royal Wedding
- Re-Animated
- Return To Halloweentown
- The Santa Clause 3: The Escape Clause
- Saving Shiloh
- Scooby-Doo! Pirates Ahoy!
- The Shaggy Dog
- Shark Bait
- Stanley's Dinosaur Round-Up
- Stormbreaker
- Strawberry Shortcake: The Sweet Dreams Movie
- Teen Titans: Trouble in Tokyo
- The Thief Lord
- Tom and Jerry: Shiver Me Whiskers
- The Ugly Duckling and Me!
- Unaccompanied Minors
- The Wild
- Zoom

2007

- Alice Upside Down
- Alvin and the Chipmunks
- Arctic Tale
- Barbie as the Island Princess
- Battle for Terra
- Bratz Kidz: Sleep-Over Adventure
- Bridge to Terabithia
- Care Bears: Oopsy Does It!
- Chill Out, Scooby-Doo!
- Christmas Is Here Again
- Cinderella III: A Twist in Time
- Daddy Day Camp
- Donkey Xote
- Enchanted
- Fairly OddBaby
- Finding Rin Tin Tin
- Firehouse Dog
- Fishtales
- Flight of the Red Balloon
- The Game Plan
- Garfield Gets Real
- The Great Discovery
- Happily N'Ever After
- Johnny Kapahala: Back on Board
- Labou
- The Land Before Time XIII: The Wisdom of Friends
- Like Stars on Earth
- Meet the Robinsons
- Mug Travel
- My Friends Tigger & Pooh: Super Sleuth Christmas Movie
- My Little Pony: A Very Pony Place
- Nancy Drew
- Nocturna
- Ratatouille
- The Secret of the Magic Gourd
- The Simpsons Movie
- Shrek the Third
- SpongeBob's Atlantis SquarePantis
- Stardust
- Strawberry Shortcake: Berry Blossom Festival
- Strawberry Shortcake: Let's Dance
- Surf's Up
- The Ten Commandments
- TMNT
- Tom and Jerry: A Nutcracker Tale
- Underdog
- The Water Horse: Legend of the Deep

2008

- All Roads Lead Home
- Asterix at the Olympic Games
- Barbie & the Diamond Castle
- Barbie Mariposa
- Bedtime Stories
- Beethoven's Big Break
- Beverly Hills Chihuahua
- Bolt
- The Chronicles of Narnia: Prince Caspian
- CJ7
- College Road Trip
- Dr. Dolittle: Tail to the Chief
- Delgo
- Dragon Hunters
- The Flight Before Christmas
- Fly Me to the Moon
- Garfield's Fun Fest
- The Great Discovery
- Hari Puttar: A Comedy of Terrors
- Horton Hears a Who!
- Igor
- Impy's Island
- Inkheart
- Kit Kittredge: An American Girl
- Kung Fu Panda
- Lost Stallions: The Journey Home
- Madagascar: Escape 2 Africa
- Merry Christmas, Drake & Josh
- Minutemen
- Missing Lynx
- Nim's Island
- Open Season 2
- The Pirates Who Don't Do Anything: A VeggieTales Movie
- Roxy Hunter and the Secret of the Shaman
- The Seven of Daran: Battle of Pareo Rock
- Scooby-Doo! and the Goblin King
- The Secret of Moonacre
- Snow Buddies
- Space Chimps
- The Spiderwick Chronicles
- Spirit of the Forest
- Spy School
- Strawberry Shortcake: Rockaberry Roll
- Summer of the Flying Saucer
- The Tale of Despereaux
- Tinker Bell
- WALL-E
- Wubbzy's Big Movie!

2009

- Aliens in the Attic
- Alvin and the Chipmunks: The Squeakquel
- An American Girl: Chrissa Stands Strong
- Arthur and the Revenge of Maltazard
- Astro Boy
- Barbie and the Three Musketeers
- Barbie Thumbelina
- Ben 10: Alien Swarm
- Broken Hill
- Chal Chalein
- Cloudy With a Chance of Meatballs
- Coraline
- Curious George 2: Follow That Monkey!
- Dr. Dolittle: Million Dollar Mutts
- Ed, Edd n Eddy's Big Picture Show
- Fantastic Mr. Fox
- G-Force
- Hachi: A Dog's Tale
- Hannah Montana: The Movie
- Happily N'Ever After 2: Snow White Another Bite @ the Apple
- The Happy Cricket and the Giant Bugs
- Hatching Pete
- Harry Potter and the Half-Blood Prince
- Hero of the Rails
- Hotel for Dogs
- Ice Age: Dawn of the Dinosaurs
- Inkheart
- Just Peck
- Looking for Jackie
- Monsters vs. Aliens
- My Little Pony: Twinkle Wish Adventure
- Night at the Museum: Battle of the Smithsonian
- The Perfect Game
- Planet 51
- The Princess and the Frog
- Professor Layton and the Eternal Diva
- Race to Witch Mountain
- Scooby-Doo! and the Samurai Sword
- Scooby-Doo! The Mystery Begins
- The Secret of Kells
- The Secret of Moonacre
- A Shine of Rainbows
- Shorts
- Space Buddies
- The Strawberry Shortcake Movie: Sky's the Limit
- Tinker Bell and the Lost Treasure
- Turtles Forever
- Up
- Vicky the Viking
- Where the Wild Things Are
- The Wild Stallion
- Wishology
- Wow! Wow! Wubbzy!: Wubb Idol

== 2010s ==
2010

- Adventures of a Teenage Dragon Slayer
- Alpha and Omega
- ...And Once Again
- Animals United
- Arrietty
- Arthur 3: The War of the Two Worlds
- Barbie: A Fashion Fairytale
- Barbie in A Mermaid Tale
- Big Time Christmas
- Big Time Concert
- The Black Tulip
- The Boy Who Cried Werewolf
- Care Bears: The Giving Festival
- Care Bears: Share Bear Shines
- A Cat in Paris
- Cats & Dogs: The Revenge of Kitty Galore
- The Chronicles of Narnia: The Voyage of the Dawn Treader
- Despicable Me
- Diary of a Wimpy Kid
- The Dog Who Saved Christmas Vacation
- Elle: A Modern Cinderella Tale
- Expecting Mary
- Firebreather
- Flicka 2
- Flipped
- Free Willy: Escape from Pirate's Cove
- Furry Vengeance
- Gaturro
- Gulliver's Travels
- Harriet the Spy: Blog Wars
- Harry Potter and the Deathly Hallows – Part 1
- How to Train Your Dragon
- Kooky
- Kung Fu Magoo
- Kung Fu Panda Holiday
- The Last Airbender
- Legend of the Guardians: The Owls of Ga'Hoole
- The Legend of Silk Boy
- Lego: The Adventures of Clutch Powers
- Marmaduke
- Megamind
- My Friends Tigger & Pooh: Super Duper Super Sleuths
- Nanny McPhee and the Big Bang
- Open Season 3
- Percy Jackson & the Olympians: The Lightning Thief
- Plumíferos
- Ramona and Beezus
- Scooby-Doo! Abracadabra-Doo
- Scooby-Doo! Camp Scare
- Scooby-Doo! Curse of the Lake Monster
- The Search for Santa Paws
- Shrek Forever After
- Space Chimps 2: Zartog Strikes Back
- Space Dogs
- Tangled
- Tinker Bell and the Great Fairy Rescue
- Tom and Jerry Meet Sherlock Holmes
- Tooth Fairy
- Toy Story 3
- A Turtle's Tale: Sammy's Adventures
- Welcome to the Space Show
- What If...
- Yogi Bear

2011

- After the Wizard
- Alvin and the Chipmunks: Chipwrecked
- Arthur Christmas
- Barbie: A Fairy Secret
- Barbie: Princess Charm School
- Beethoven's Christmas Adventure
- Best Player
- Beverly Hills Chihuahua 2
- Big Time Beach Party
- Cars 2
- Chillar Party
- Dolphin Tale
- Diary of a Wimpy Kid: Rodrick Rules
- The Dragon Pearl
- A Fairly Odd Movie: Grow Up, Timmy Turner!
- From Up on Poppy Hill
- Gnomeo & Juliet
- The Great Bear
- The Great Ghost Rescue
- The Gruffalo's Child
- Happy Feet Two
- Harry Potter and the Deathly Hallows – Part 2
- Hoodwinked Too! Hood vs. Evil
- Hop
- Hugo
- Judy Moody and the Not Bummer Summer
- Koko and the Ghosts
- Kung Fu Panda 2
- The Lamp
- Leafie, A Hen Into the Wild
- The Little Engine That Could
- The Magic of Belle Isle
- Mars Needs Moms
- Monster Mutt
- A Monster in Paris
- Monte Carlo
- Mr. Popper's Penguins
- The Muppets
- My Angel
- Once Upon a Warrior
- Phineas and Ferb the Movie: Across the 2nd Dimension
- Pixie Hollow Games
- Puss in Boots
- Quest for Zhu
- Rango
- Red Dog
- Rio
- Scooby-Doo! Legend of the Phantosaur
- SeeFood
- The Smurfs
- Snowflake, the White Gorilla
- Spy Kids: All the Time in the World
- Tainá 3: The Origin
- Tibetan Dog
- Tom and Jerry and the Wizard of Oz
- Top Cat: The Movie
- Winnie the Pooh

2012

- The Adventures of Mickey Matson and the Copperhead Treasure
- Back to the Sea
- Barbie in A Mermaid Tale 2
- Barbie: The Princess & the Popstar
- Beverly Hills Chihuahua 3
- Big Time Movie
- Big Top Scooby-Doo!
- Brave
- Cowgirls 'n Angels
- Diary of a Wimpy Kid: Dog Days
- Dino Time
- Echo Planet
- Ernest & Celestine
- A Fairly Odd Christmas
- Hotel Transylvania
- Ice Age: Continental Drift
- The Lorax
- Madagascar 3: Europe's Most Wanted
- The Oogieloves in the Big Balloon Adventure
- Outback
- ParaNorman
- Peixonauta – Agente Secreto da O.S.T.R.A.
- The Pirates! In an Adventure with Scientists!
- Rags
- The Reef 2: High Tide
- Room on the Broom
- Sammy's Great Escape
- Santa Paws 2: The Santa Pups
- Scooby-Doo! Music of the Vampire
- Secret of the Wings
- The Snow Queen
- The Snowman and the Snowdog
- So Undercover
- The Swan Princess Christmas
- Tad, the Lost Explorer
- Tinker Bell and the Secret of the Wings
- Thunderstruck
- Tom and Jerry: Robin Hood and His Merry Mouse
- A Turtle's Tale 2: Sammy's Escape from Paradise
- Wreck-It Ralph
- Yak: The Giant King
- Zambezia

2013

- Against the Wild
- Alpha and Omega 2: A Howl-iday Adventure
- Angels Sing
- Bunks
- Cloudy with a Chance of Meatballs 2
- Contest
- The Croods
- Despicable Me 2
- Epic
- Escape from Planet Earth
- Free Birds
- Frozen
- The House of Magic
- Jinxed
- Jungle Master
- Justin and the Knights of Valour
- Legends of Oz: Dorothy's Return
- Monsters University
- Moshi Monsters: The Movie
- My Little Pony: Equestria Girls
- Nicky Deuce
- Percy Jackson: Sea of Monsters
- Planes
- Return to Nim's Island
- Robosapien: Rebooted
- Savannah
- Scooby-Doo! Adventures: The Mystery Map
- Scooby-Doo! Mask of the Blue Falcon
- Scooby-Doo! Stage Fright
- The Smurfs 2
- Super Buddies
- Swindle
- A Talking Cat!?!
- Thunder and the House of Magic
- Tom and Jerry's Giant Adventure
- Transformers Prime Beast Hunters: Predacons Rising
- Turbo
- Underdogs
- Walking with Dinosaurs
- Wish You Well
- Zambezia
- Zip & Zap and the Marble Gang

2014

- Alexander and the Terrible, Horrible, No Good, Very Bad Day
- Alpha and Omega 3: The Great Wolf Games
- Alpha and Omega 4: The Legend of the Saw Tooth Cave
- Annie
- Asterix and Obelix: Mansion of the Gods
- Big Hero 6
- The Book of Life
- Boonie Bears: To the Rescue
- The Boxtrolls
- Dolphin Tale 2
- Dragon Nest: Warriors' Dawn
- Earth to Echo
- From Up on Poppy Hill
- The Frogville
- Henry & Me
- The Hero of Color City
- How to Steal a Dog
- How to Train Your Dragon 2
- The Incredible Adventures of Professor Branestawm
- Jungle Shuffle
- The Lego Movie
- The Monkey King
- Mr. Peabody & Sherman
- Muppets Most Wanted
- My Little Pony: Equestria Girls – Rainbow Rocks
- Night at the Museum: Secret of the Tomb
- The Nut Job
- Paddington
- Penguins of Madagascar
- Ping Pong Summer
- The Pirate Fairy
- Planes: Fire & Rescue
- Postman Pat: The Movie
- Pudsey the Dog: The Movie
- Rio 2
- Scooby-Doo! Frankencreepy
- Scooby-Doo! WrestleMania Mystery
- Song of the Sea
- The Swan Princess: A Royal Family Tale
- Tom and Jerry: The Lost Dragon
- Tom and Jerry: Santa's Little Helpers

2015

- Alibaba and the Thief
- Alvin and the Chipmunks: The Road Chip
- Blinky Bill the Movie
- Brave Rabbit 2 Crazy Circus
- Capture the Flag
- The Flintstones & WWE: Stone Age SmackDown!
- The Good Dinosaur
- Goosebumps
- Heidi
- Home
- Hotel Transylvania 2
- Huevos: Little Rooster's Egg-cellent Adventure
- Inside Out
- The Invincible Piglet
- The Little Prince
- Marshall the Miracle Dog
- Maya the Bee
- Minions
- My Little Pony: Equestria Girls – Friendship Games
- Oddball
- Ooops! Noah Is Gone...
- Paper Planes
- The Peanuts Movie
- Pokémon the Movie: Hoopa and the Clash of Ages
- Pororo: Cyberspace Adventure
- Scooby-Doo! and Kiss: Rock and Roll Mystery
- Scooby-Doo! Moon Monster Madness
- Shaun the Sheep Movie
- Snowtime!
- The SpongeBob Movie: Sponge Out of Water
- Strange Magic
- Tinker Bell and the Legend of the NeverBeast
- Tom and Jerry: Spy Quest
- Top Cat Begins

2016

- The Angry Birds Movie
- Dear Eleanor
- El Americano: The Movie
- Finding Dory
- Ice Age: Collision Course
- Kung Fu Panda 3
- The Land Before Time: Journey of the Brave
- Lego Scooby-Doo! Haunted Hollywood
- Middle School: The Worst Years of My Life
- Moana
- My Little Pony: Equestria Girls – Legend of Everfree
- Nine Lives
- Norm of the North
- Papa
- Ratchet & Clank
- Robinson Crusoe
- Rock Dog
- Scooby-Doo! and WWE: Curse of the Speed Demon
- The Secret Life of Pets
- Sheep and Wolves
- Sing
- Spark
- Storks
- Trolls
- Zootopia

2017

- Animal Crackers
- The Boss Baby
- Bunyan & Babe
- Cars 3
- Captain Underpants: The First Epic Movie
- Coco
- Despicable Me 3
- Diary of a Wimpy Kid: The Long Haul
- A Dog's Purpose
- The Emoji Movie
- Ferdinand
- Gnome Alone
- Hey Arnold!: The Jungle Movie
- The Jetsons & WWE: Robo-WrestleMania!
- The Lego Batman Movie
- The Lego Ninjago Movie
- Lego Scooby-Doo! Blowout Beach Bash
- Monster Trucks
- My Little Pony: The Movie
- The Nut Job 2: Nutty by Nature
- Paddington 2
- Scooby-Doo! Shaggy's Showdown
- Smurfs: The Lost Village
- The Star

2018

- A Wrinkle in Time
- Duck Duck Goose
- F.R.E.D.I.
- Goosebumps 2: Haunted Halloween
- Hotel Transylvania 3: Summer Vacation
- The House with a Clock in Its Walls
- Incredibles 2
- Mary Poppins Returns
- Maya the Bee: The Honey Games
- The Nutcracker and the Four Realms
- Peter Rabbit
- Ralph Breaks the Internet
- Scooby-Doo! & Batman: The Brave and the Bold
- Scooby-Doo! and the Gourmet Ghost
- Sherlock Gnomes
- Smallfoot
- Spider-Man: Into the Spider-Verse
- Teen Titans Go! To the Movies

2019

- Abominable
- The Angry Birds Movie 2
- Arctic Dogs
- A Dog's Way Home
- Dora and the Lost City of Gold
- Frozen II
- How to Train Your Dragon: The Hidden World
- The Kid Who Would Be King
- Klaus
- The Lego Movie 2: The Second Part
- Missing Link
- Nancy Drew and the Hidden Staircase
- Playing with Fire
- Playmobil: The Movie
- Pokémon Detective Pikachu
- Scooby-Doo! and the Curse of the 13th Ghost
- Scooby-Doo! Return to Zombie Island
- Toy Story 4
- The Secret Life of Pets 2
- A Shaun the Sheep Movie: Farmageddon
- Sheep and Wolves: Pig Deal
- Spies in Disguise
- UglyDolls
- Wonder Park

== 2020s ==
2020

- Artemis Fowl
- Cats & Dogs 3: Paws Unite!
- Dolittle
- Curious George: Go West, Go Wild
- The Croods: A New Age
- Happy Halloween, Scooby-Doo!
- Norm of the North: Family Vacation
- Onward
- The One and Only Ivan
- Over the Moon
- Phineas and Ferb the Movie: Candace Against the Universe
- Scoob!
- Soul
- The Secret Garden
- Sonic the Hedgehog
- The SpongeBob Movie: Sponge on the Run
- Timmy Failure: Mistakes Were Made
- Trolls World Tour
- We Bare Bears: The Movie
- We Can Be Heroes
- The Willoughbys
- Wolfwalkers

2021

- Back to the Outback
- The Boss Baby: Family Business
- Clifford the Big Red Dog
- Encanto
- Finding ʻOhana
- Flora & Ulysses
- Hilda and the Mountain King
- Home Sweet Home Alone
- The Loud House Movie
- Luca
- Marcel the Shell with Shoes On
- Maya the Bee: The Golden Orb
- The Mitchells vs. the Machines
- My Little Pony: A New Generation
- PAW Patrol: The Movie
- Peter Rabbit 2: The Runaway
- Raya and the Last Dragon
- Ron's Gone Wrong
- Scooby-Doo! The Sword and the Scoob
- Sing 2
- Space Jam: A New Legacy
- Spirit Untamed
- Straight Outta Nowhere: Scooby-Doo! Meets Courage the Cowardly Dog
- Tom & Jerry
- Vivo
- Wish Dragon

2022

- The Amazing Maurice
- The Bad Guys
- Better Nate Than Ever
- Blue's Big City Adventure
- Chip 'n Dale: Rescue Rangers
- DC League of Super-Pets
- Guillermo del Toro's Pinocchio
- Hocus Pocus 2
- Hotel Transylvania: Transformania
- The Ice Age Adventures of Buck Wild
- King Tweety
- Lightyear
- Luck
- Lyle, Lyle, Crocodile
- Minions: The Rise of Gru
- My Father's Dragon
- Night at the Museum: Kahmunrah Rises Again
- Paws of Fury: The Legend of Hank
- Puss in Boots: The Last Wish
- The Sea Beast
- Sonic the Hedgehog 2
- Strange World
- Tom and Jerry: Cowboy Up!
- Too Old for Fairy Tales
- Trick or Treat Scooby-Doo!

2023

- Baby Shark's Big Movie!
- Chicken Run: Dawn of the Nugget
- Craig Before the Creek
- Elemental
- Glisten and the Merry Mission
- Good Burger 2
- Ladybug & Cat Noir: The Movie
- Leo
- The Magician's Elephant
- Migration
- Nimona
- PAW Patrol: The Mighty Movie
- Rally Road Racers
- Ruby Gillman, Teenage Kraken
- Scooby-Doo! and Krypto, Too!
- Spider-Man: Across the Spider-Verse
- Spy Kids: Armageddon
- The Super Mario Bros. Movie
- Teenage Mutant Ninja Turtles: Mutant Mayhem
- Trolls Band Together
- Under the Boardwalk
- Wish
- Wonka
- World's Best

2024

- Big City Greens the Movie: Spacecation
- The Casagrandes Movie
- The Day the Earth Blew Up: A Looney Tunes Movie
- Despicable Me 4
- The Garfield Movie
- Harold and the Purple Crayon
- IF
- Inside Out 2
- Kung Fu Panda 4
- Moana 2
- Mufasa: The Lion King
- No Time to Spy: A Loud House Movie
- Orion and the Dark
- Out of My Mind
- Paddington in Peru
- Popular Theory
- Runt
- Ryan's World the Movie: Titan Universe Adventure
- Spellbound
- Sonic the Hedgehog 3
- Thelma the Unicorn
- The Tiger's Apprentice
- Transformers One
- Wallace & Gromit: Vengeance Most Fowl
- Wicked
- The Wild Robot
- Woody Woodpecker Goes to Camp

2025

- Alexander and the Terrible, Horrible, No Good, Very Bad Road Trip
- Animal Farm
- The Bad Guys 2
- David
- Dog Man
- Elio
- Freakier Friday
- Gabby's Dollhouse: The Movie
- How to Train Your Dragon
- In Your Dreams
- The King of Kings
- KPop Demon Hunters
- Lilo & Stitch
- A Minecraft Movie
- Plankton: The Movie
- Smurfs
- Snow White
- The SpongeBob Movie: Search for SquarePants
- The Twits
- Wicked: For Good
- Zootopia 2

2026

- The Angry Birds Movie 3
- The Cat in the Hat
- Coyote vs. Acme
- Forgotten Island
- Goat
- Hexed
- Hoppers
- The Magic Faraway Tree
- Minions & Monsters
- PAW Patrol: The Dino Movie
- The Pout-Pout Fish
- Shaun the Sheep: The Beast of Mossy Bottom
- The Sheep Detectives
- Steps
- The Super Mario Galaxy Movie
- Swapped
- Toy Story 5
- Wildwood

2027

- Air Bud Returns
- Bad Fairies
- CoComelon: The Movie
- Frozen 3
- Gatto
- Ice Age: Boiling Point
- A Minecraft Movie 2
- Narnia: The Magician's Nephew
- Not Alone
- Shrek 5
- Sonic the Hedgehog 4
- Spider-Man: Beyond the Spider-Verse
- Untitled Teenage Mutant Ninja Turtles: Mutant Mayhem sequel

== See also ==
- List of children's films
