= F.R.E.D.I. =

2018 film directed by Sean Olson

- Directed by: Sean Olson
- Written by: Kat Olson; Sean Olson; Lee Schneller; Johnny Remo
- Production company: Skipstone Pictures
- Release date: October 19, 2018 (digital/DVD)
- Running time: 90 minutes
- Country: United States
- Language: English

F.R.E.D.I. is a 2018 family film directed by Sean Olson.

== Premise ==
Dr. Palmer (Kelly Hu) steals a robotics project she was working on called F.R.E.D.I. from the lab. (voiced by Candace Cameron Bure), and is noticed by her opportunistic boss Grant (Angus Macfadyen), who sets his security guards to capture her. While escaping, her car breaks down due to the robot, and the Doctor has to abandon him in the forest, where he is found by a group of teenagers, James (Lucius Hoyos) and Danny (Reid Miller).

== Cast ==
- Kelly Hu - Dr. Andi Palmer
- Angus Macfadyen - Grant
- Candace Cameron Bure - F.R.E.D.I. (voice)
- Lucius Hoyos - James Nash
- Reid Miller - Danny
- Tyler Christopher - Randy Nash
- Casimere Jollette - Natalie
- Christina Cox - Williams
- Texas Battle - Brody
- Harvey Guillén - Lopez
- Chloe Lukasiak - Mallory

== Reception ==
On Common Sense Media, Barbara Shulgasser-Parker rated the film 2 out of 5, calling it an "E.T. wannabe.". In his review on Film Threat, Alan Ng rated the film 6,5 out of 10, calling it "a whimsical story".

== See also ==
- List of American children's films
