= Pravas =

2025 Indian Gujarati family drama film

- Official Poster
- Directed by: Vipul Sharma
- Written by: Vipul Sharma
- Produced by: Jay Pandya; Rakesh Shah
- Starring: Vishal Thakkar; Jay Pandya; Komal Panchal; Nishma Soni
- Cinematography: Sreekumar Nair
- Edited by: Amit k. Kaushik
- Music by: Pritam Shukla
- Production companies: Scorewiin LLP; R.Shah Entertainment
- Distributed by: Rupam Entertainment Pvt Ltd
- Release date: 7 November 2025
- Country: India
- Language: Gujarati

Pravas is a 2025 Indian Gujarati family drama film directed and written by Vipul Sharma and produced by Jay Pandya and Rakesh Shah. It stars Vishal Thakkar, Jay Pandya, Harsh Shah, Komal Panchal, Nishma Soni and others. It was released on 7 November 2025.

The film follows the emotional journey of a young boy from a remote village whose dreams of visiting the city are challenged by his family's financial circumstances. It has been screened at several international film festivals and has received multiple awards, including recognition as Best Children's film at the Dhaka International Film Festival, where the Badal Rahman Award was presented in the presence of Iranian filmmaker Majid Majidi and Indian actress Sharmila Tagore.

== Plot ==
Pravas tells the heartfelt story of Tino, a young boy from a humble village in Gujarat who dreams of visiting Ahmedabad after hearing enchanting tales about the city. When his school plans a trip there, Tino's excitement knows no bounds - until his family's financial struggles force him to stay behind. As his friends embark on the journey, Tino experiences his own emotional voyage, one that explores hope, longing, and the strength to find joy amidst hardship.

== Cast ==
- Vishal Thakkar as Tino
- Jay Pandya as Hari
- Komal Panchal as Lakshmi
- Nishma Soni as Sapna
- Pranshu Shah as Bachudiyo
- Harsh Shah as Teacher
- Nayan Chatrariya as Principal
- Manisha Narkar as Sonalben
- Vijay Solanki as Ghano
- Sahil Patel as Jago
- Hiranya Zinzuwadia as Devam
- Vatshal Doshi as Pappu
- Ansh Chokshi as Munno
- Nitya Dave as Shreya
- Kianaah Patel as Riya
- Diya Kotak as Sonu
- Lavya Shah as Dhruv
- Parth Singod as Doctor

== Production ==
The film was shot at a remote village in Gujarat.

== Release ==
The film was released theatrically on 7 November 2025.

== See also ==
- List of Gujarati films of 2025
- List of Gujarati films
- List of children's films
