= Menno Westendorp =

Dutch cinematographer

- Born: October 5, 1969 (age 56); Geldrop, North Brabant, Netherlands
- Occupation: Cinematographer
- Website: www.mennowestendorp.nl

Menno Westendorp (born October 5, 1969) is a Dutch cinematographer.

== Filmography ==
- The Seven of Daran: Battle of Pareo Rock (2008)
- Offers (2005)
- AmnesiA (2001)
- Jesus Is a Palestinian (1999)

== Awards ==
- 2008 won Golden Calf Award for Best Photography (Het echte leven)
