= Echo Planet =

2012 Thai animated film

Echo Planet (เอคโค่ จิ๋วก้องโลก)
- Directed by: Kompin Keamkumned
- Screenplay by: Warunyu Udomkanjananon; Kongded Jaturuntradsame; Pornsawan Seebunwong; Jarunporn Prorapukbunlay
- Story by: Kompin Keamkumned; Warunyu Udomkangananon; Net Puntumasincai
- Starring: Nungtida Sopon; Atipich Sutiwatkagorncai; Noppant Jantarasorn; Kongded Jaturuntradsame; Warinda Dumrongpon
- Cinematography: Puchis Asavamahasakda
- Edited by: Tummarat Sumetsupasork
- Music by: Kongded Jaturuntradsame; Chadchai Pongprapunt
- Production company: Kantana Animation Studios
- Distributed by: Kantana Group
- Release date: August 2, 2012
- Running time: 90 min.
- Country: Thailand
- Languages: Thai; English
- Budget: $5.6 million
- Box office: $1.1 million

Echo Planet (Thai: เอคโค่ จิ๋วก้องโลก, romanized: Echo Jew Gong Lok, RTGS: Ekkho Chio Kong Lok) (also known as Adventure Planet) is a 2012 Thai 3D animation film produced and distributed by Kantana Group directed by Kompin Keamkumned. It is the story of the adventures of three young men from two of the world's metropolis, New State Trinity Capital and Karen village in Northern Thailand. To help save the world from disaster recovery due to global warming.

== Plot ==
Sam is the spoiled and disgruntled son of the Capital City president. During a trip with the scouts, the child, who relies too much on technology, gets lost and ends up in the rural village of an exotic country where Nora and her brother Kim live. When an ecological disaster of biblical proportions threatens to destroy the Earth, the trio join forces in an attempt to save the planet, endangered not only by global warming but also by scientists and world politicians who think they are fighting the threat with cold bombs.
