= The Seven of Daran: Battle of Pareo Rock =

- Theatrical release poster
- Directed by: Lourens Blok
- Written by: Bart Juttmann
- Produced by: Felice Bakker; Rolf Visser
- Starring: Johann Harmse; Ketrice Maitisa; Caroline Goodall; Robin Smith
- Cinematography: Menno Westendorp
- Edited by: J.P. Luijsterburg
- Music by: Maarten Spruijt
- Production company: AAA Pictures
- Distributed by: Buena Vista International
- Release date: 18 September 2008
- Running time: 86 minutes
- Country: Netherlands
- Language: English
- Box office: $307,410

The Seven of Daran: Battle of Pareo Rock (Dutch: De Zeven van Daran: De strijd om Pareo Rots) is a 2008 English-language Dutch adventure film directed by Lourens Blok. It is the first of a planned series of seven films, which may be made depending on the success. It was filmed in South Africa and Namibia.

== Plot ==
11-year-old boy Jimmy Westwood (Johann Harmse) lives in South-Africa with his mother. The young girl Charita (Ketrice Maitisa) from the Saladir tribe lives alone in the city and works on the street cleaning car windows. One day she cleans the windows of the car of Jimmy and his mother, without asking; she does not get paid. Later she takes revenge by stealing Jimmy's wallet. Jimmy goes after her and asks the wallet back. This happens at a market where a small white giraffe is sold through an auction. It can talk and tells Jimmy that he has to prevent an upcoming war between two tribes, the Bombattas and the Saladir. It gives Jimmy a magical pendant. Jimmy frees the giraffe. With Charita he runs away, chased by the owner who sold the giraffe but had not delivered it yet to the buyer. They are arrested and locked up by the police. Charita returns the wallet to Jimmy, withholding money for cleaning the car windows. They are friends now. Jimmy is released when his mother comes to collect him. The mother of their maid knows about the giraffe, and explains to Jimmy that it is one of the "seven of Daran", magical animals which each watch over one continent. This convinces Jimmy that he has to do what the giraffe instructed him to do. He leaves a note for his mother that he is going on a mission, and frees Charita from the police cell. Together they go to the war zone to be, to prevent the war, as Jimmy was told to do by the giraffe.

A child soldier from the Bombatta tribe shoots Jimmy in his leg, but despite that and the fact that the child soldier and the girl are from the opposing tribes, the three become friends. They are caught by the owner of the giraffe, and taken by car to help finding the giraffe, or similar ones. Jimmy's mother, who found out where Jimmy was going, comes by helicopter to search for him. She sees Jimmy in the car, after which the pilot attacks the car, and the three children are freed. Jimmy learns from his mother that she has caused hostility between the tribes because she wants to make a golf course, which one tribe wants to earn money, but the other opposes because it is on ground that is sacred for them.

Jimmy's mother does not allow Jimmy to go and try to prevent the war, but he sneaks with the other two children into the helicopter, and Jimmy flies away; he has learned flying from a flight simulator game on his computer. They arrive in the war zone, where later the mother also arrives. Jimmy is hit by a bullet, but saved by the fact that the bullet hits the pendant. His mother agrees to abandon the plan for the golf course, and the tribes reconcile.

== Release ==
The film was released on DVD and Blu-ray on 11 February 2009 by Walt Disney Studios Home Entertainment under the Disney DVD and Disney Blu-ray labels.
