= The Wooden Camera =

- Directed by: Ntshavheni wa Luruli
- Written by: Yves Buclet; Peter Speyer
- Produced by: Olivier Delahaye; Richard Green; Ben Woolford
- Starring: Junior Singo; Dana de Agrella; Innocent Msimango
- Cinematography: Gordon Spooner
- Edited by: Kako Kelber
- Distributed by: TLA Releasing
- Release date: 6 October 2003 (Marrakech International Film Festival)
- Running time: 92 min.
- Countries: South Africa; France; United Kingdom
- Language: English

The Wooden Camera is a 2003 South African film directed by Ntshavheni wa Luruli and starring Junior Singo, Dana de Agrella, and Innocent Msimango.

== Plot ==
The film takes place in and around Cape Town and a nearby township, Khayelitsha. The film centers around two teenage friends, the younger Madiba (Junior Singo) and the elder Sipho (Innocent Msimango). One day, as they are playing alongside the railroad tracks, they find a dead body. With him they find a gun with one bullet and a video camera. Sipho takes the gun and Madiba takes the camera, which he puts inside a wooden toy camera to make it seem a not-working toy. Sipho seems to harmlessly joke about the gun at first, but begins spending more time in Cape Town, robbing parking meters and paying for glue to sniff. He eventually starts living in abandoned places in Cape Town with a group of thugs.

Madiba films the world around him, finding beauty in both Khayelitsha and Cape Town. He tries many filming techniques and is skilled, but finds his videos very personal and does not normally let other people see them. While in Cape Town, he meets and forges an unlikely friendship with a white Cape Town girl, Estelle (Dana de Agrella) from a rich family, who gets into conflict with her racist father about this. Sipho uses the gun to rob people. Madiba disapproves and does not want any of the stolen money, but still considers him his friend. One of Sipho's robberies goes wrong and he is killed. In the end Madiba and Estelle run off and take a train together.

== Awards ==
- 2004 Berlin International Film Festival Won - Best Feature Film (Ntshavheni wa Luruli)
- 2004 Paris Film Festival
  - Won - Best Cinematography (Gordon Spooner)
  - Won - Prix Henri Alekan (Gordon Spooner)
- 2004 Rotterdam International Film Festival Nominated - Tiger Award (Ntshavheni wa Luruli)
