= Brave Rabbit 2: Crazy Circus =

Brave Rabbit 2 Crazy Circus
- Directed by: Zeng Xianlin
- Release date: January 1, 2015 (China)
- Running time: 88 minutes
- Country: China
- Language: Mandarin
- Box office: ¥18.28 million (China)

Brave Rabbit 2 Crazy Circus (Chinese: 闯堂兔2疯狂马戏团) is a 2015 Chinese animated children's adventure comedy film directed by Zeng Xianlin. It was released on January 1.

== Voice cast ==
- Xiaoliansha
- Dingdang
- Hao Xianghai
- Wang Xing
- Wang Qi
- Zhu Rongrong

== Reception ==
By January 7, 2015, the film had earned ¥18.28 million at the Chinese box office.
