= The Legend of Silk Boy =

2010 film directed by David Liu

- Film poster
- Written by: Neil Every; Christopher Donaldson
- Produced by: David Liu
- Starring: Jackie Chan; Ashleigh Ball; Garry Chalk; Michael Donovan; Maryke Hendrikse; Richard Ian Cox; Brian Drummond; Michael Donovan; Anna Cummer
- Release date: 20 August 2010
- Running time: 90 minutes
- Country: China
- Language: English

The Legend of Silk Boy (世博总动员) is a 2010 Chinese animated film directed by David Liu and starring Jackie Chan.

== Synopsis ==
In London 1851, the Industrial Revolution was in full swing, but the environment was deteriorating rapidly. Chinese businessman Xu Rongcun brought "Rongji Husi" to the first London World Expo. The pure and natural Chinese silk won two gold and silver medals in one fell swoop and became famous overseas. However, the arrogant British silk merchant Freestone I also exhibited silk produced by machines, thinking that he would win without a doubt. The loss of honor made him hate Chinese silk and vowed to be an enemy of the Xu family for generations.

More than 100 years later, a smart but flamboyant little boy named Hu Sizi appeared in Shanghai. He is a descendant of Xu Rongcun, but he disdains his family's silk business, but he is interested in robot models. In a competition, because he did not understand the importance of teamwork and friendship, he missed the opportunity to enter the top robot school and was extremely depressed. All this was used by Freestone IV in an attempt to destroy Chinese silk and rewrite the history of the 1851 World Expo.

The rewriting of history will destroy the Chinese silk civilization and bring disaster to mankind. When Hu Sizi learned the family secrets and Freestone IV's conspiracy from his grandfather, his kind and brave nature gradually emerged. He knew he had to take responsibility and correct his mistakes. So, Hu Sizi embarked on an adventure, fighting beasts, exploring ancient tombs, and searching for holy objects with all kinds of people.

== Cast ==
- Jackie Chan as Xu Rongcun
- Ashleigh Ball as Silk Boy
- Garry Chalk as Grandfather
- Michael Donovan as Ginsing King
- Maryke Hendrikse as Tour Guide Tammy
- Richard Ian Cox as Puffball
- Brian Drummond as Stinkhorn, Lucky
- Anna Cummer as Anya
