= Strawberry Shortcake: Rockaberry Roll =

- Starring: Sarah Heinke
- Production companies: DIC Entertainment; American Greetings
- Distributed by: 20th Century Fox Home Entertainment
- Release date: August 12, 2008
- Running time: 44 minutes
- Country: United States
- Language: English

Strawberry Shortcake: Rockaberry Roll is an American animated compilation film that was released on August 12, 2008, by 20th Century Fox Home Entertainment, and was later shown theatrically by Kidtoon Films in October.

== Synopsis ==
As with the other DVDs of Strawberry Shortcake, Rockaberry Roll uses a "Compilation" format where Strawberry recalls the featured episodes in her "Remembering Book". The episodes featured on this DVD are "It Takes Talent" and "Playing to Beat the Band".

=== It Takes Talent ===
Strawberry and her friends form a band called Strawberry Jam. They participate in a talent show, where they almost bomb out due to lack of teamwork.

=== Playing to Beat the Band ===
With Ginger Snap gone to her vacation at the beach, Peppermint Fizz offers to help Strawberry Jam get back together and put on a show as a trumpet player, but does not get what she hoped for.
