= The Lamp (2011 film) =

- Directed by: Tracy Trost
- Based on: The Lamp by Jim Stovall
- Starring: Jason London; Meredith Salenger; Louis Gossett Jr.
- Release date: August 1, 2011
- Country: United States
- Language: English

The Lamp, also known as The Lamp: Just Believe, is a 2011 American drama film, based on the novel of the same name by Jim Stovall, directed by Tracy Trost which stars Jason London, Meredith Salenger, and Louis Gossett Jr.

== Plot ==
After the death of their son, Stanley (Jason London) and Lisa Walters (Meredith Salenger)'s marriage is falling apart, until they are presented with a strange gift – an old oil lamp. Along with the lamp comes a mysterious messenger, Charles Montgomery III (Louis Gossett Jr), who will grant the couple 3 wishes to put things right. They must choose carefully, and search the depths of their hearts to find the truth.

== Cast ==
- Jason London as Stanley Walters
- Meredith Salenger as Lisa Walters
- Louis Gossett Jr. as Charles Montgomery III
- Sarah Joy Brown as Deb
- Muse Watson as Sam
- L. Scott Caldwell as Miss Esther
- Cameron Ten Napel as Josh
- Georgia Cole as Alex
- Katie Burgess as Rachel
- Greyson Moore as Eddy Walters
- Reed Williams as Austin
- Darrell Alan Cole as Cody
- Len Gunn as Fitness Club Flirt
- James Hilton Jestus as Deb's baby
- Chuck Browne as Deb's husband
- Roger Nix as minister
- Derek Jackson as Tigers' coach
- Cooper the dog as himself

== Distribution ==
Exploration Films signed a distribution agreement with Trost Moving Pictures in 2018. Exploration Films manages worldwide distribution for The Lamp.
