= The Frogville =

- Release date: 3 October 2014
- Running time: 85 minutes
- Country: Taiwan
- Language: Mandarin
- Box office: NT$510,000 (Taipei)

The Frogville (Chinese: 桃蛙源記) is a 2014 Taiwanese 3D animated children's film. It was released on October 3.

== Box Office ==
The film has earned NT$510,000 in Taipei.
