= Strawberry Shortcake: Let's Dance =

- Australian DVD cover
- Starring: Sarah Heinke
- Distributed by: Kidtoon Films (theatrical); 20th Century Fox Home Entertainment (DVD)
- Release dates: September 1, 2007 (theatrical); October 2, 2007 (DVD)
- Running time: 45 minutes
- Country: United States
- Language: English

Strawberry Shortcake: Let's Dance is a 2007 American animated compilation film and was released on October 2 by 20th Century Fox Home Entertainment, although it was given an early release by Kidtoon Films on September 1 in select cinemas.

== Plot ==
Like with the other DVDs of Strawberry Shortcake, Let's Dance uses a "Compilation" format where Strawberry recalls the featured episodes in her "Remembering Book". The episodes featured on this DVD are Dancin' in Disguise and Meet Apricot.

=== Dancin' in Disguise (Everybody Dance) ===
Sour Grapes distracts the girls with dance lessons while the Purple Pie Man loots the berry fields, but Sour later experiences a change of heart since she enjoys teaching the girls.

=== Meet Apricot (Let's Dance) ===
While the others are ice skating, sweet and shy Apricot makes up stories to try to make friends, but soon learns that one does not need tall tales to have someone like them.

== Soundtrack ==
The soundtrack album, from Koch Records, debuted on September 25, more than a week before the film's DVD premiere. It also contains music for Berry Blossom Festival and an then-upcoming DVD release Berry Big Journeys.
