= The Invincible Piglet =

- 无敌小飞猪
- Directed by: Song Zhantao
- Release date: April 3, 2015
- Running time: 93 minutes
- Country: China
- Languages: Mandarin; English
- Box office: CN¥3.06 million (China)

The Invincible Piglet (Chinese: 无敌小飞猪) is 2015 Chinese live action/animated children's fantasy adventure film directed by Song Zhantao. It was released on April 3, 2015, in China.

== Cast ==
- Cheung Laap Wai
- Zhang Zhilu
- Norman Chu
- Caterina Murino
- Fan Zixuan
- He Yuehan
- Huang Zanchen
- Yu Dongze
- Fan Zexi
- Zhu Zhelin
- Xiao Xiafei

== Reception ==
The film grossed CN¥3.06 million at the Chinese box office.
