= Labou =

- Theatrical release poster by Drew Struzan
- Directed by: Greg Aronowitz
- Written by: Greg Aronowitz
- Story by: Greg Aronowitz; Sheri Bryant
- Produced by: Sheri Bryant
- Starring: Chris Violette; Monica May; Kelson Henderson; Barnie Duncan; Marissa Cuevas; Darnel Hamilton; Bryan James Kitto; Earl J Scioneaux Jr.
- Music by: Nathan Wang; Christie Yih Chong
- Production companies: Dog and Rooster Productions; Discovery Productions, Inc.
- Distributed by: Metro-Goldwyn-Mayer
- Release date: February 2008 (Oxford Film Festival)
- Running time: 98 minutes
- Language: English
- Budget: $5 million

Labou is a 2008 American independent adventure film written and directed by Greg Aronowitz, based on a story by Aronowitz and producer Sheri Bryant. It was released by MGM on May 19, 2009. The film has received three prestigious awards including Best of Fest at the Chicago International Children's Film Festival, Best Family Feature at WorldFest 2008 Houston, and Best Feature at Bam Kids Film Festival in NY; and has also been approved by the Dove Foundation, KidsFirst!, and NAPPA.

Several members of the cast and crew, including cinematographer Simon Riera, worked previously with Aronowitz on Power Rangers SPD, for which Aronowitz was a writer, director and executive producer. Some production took place in New Zealand, where that series was shot. Production was interrupted by Hurricane Katrina, forcing the cast and crew to abandon production and return in early 2006. The film has a dedication at the end to the people of New Orleans.

New Orleans Mayor Ray Nagin appears in Labou as the Mayor of New Orleans. Local jazz legend Ellis Marsalis plays the wise "Jazz Man" in the picture.

Drew Struzan designed the film's poster and the website was created by Ian J. Duncan.

== Plot summary ==
Three unlikely friends set out on a journey to find the dreaded Ghost of Captain LeRouge whose treasure laden ship was lost in the Louisiana bayou over two hundred years ago. What they find is an adventure beyond their wildest imagination and the magical swamp creature "Labou" whose whistles are rumored to be the original inspiration for jazz.

With the help of Labou, the kids race to stay one step ahead of two crazy oil tycoons and discover the long lost treasure in time to save the swamps from destruction.

== Cast ==
- Bryan James Kitto as Toddster
- Marissa Cuevas as Emily Ryan
- Darnell Hamilton as Gavin Thomson
- Chris Violette as Reggie
- Earl J Scioneaux Jr. as Ronald
- Monica May as Librarian
- Kelson Henderson as Clayton
- Barnie Duncan as Captain Lerouge
