= Monster Mutt =

Specialized competition off-road vehicle

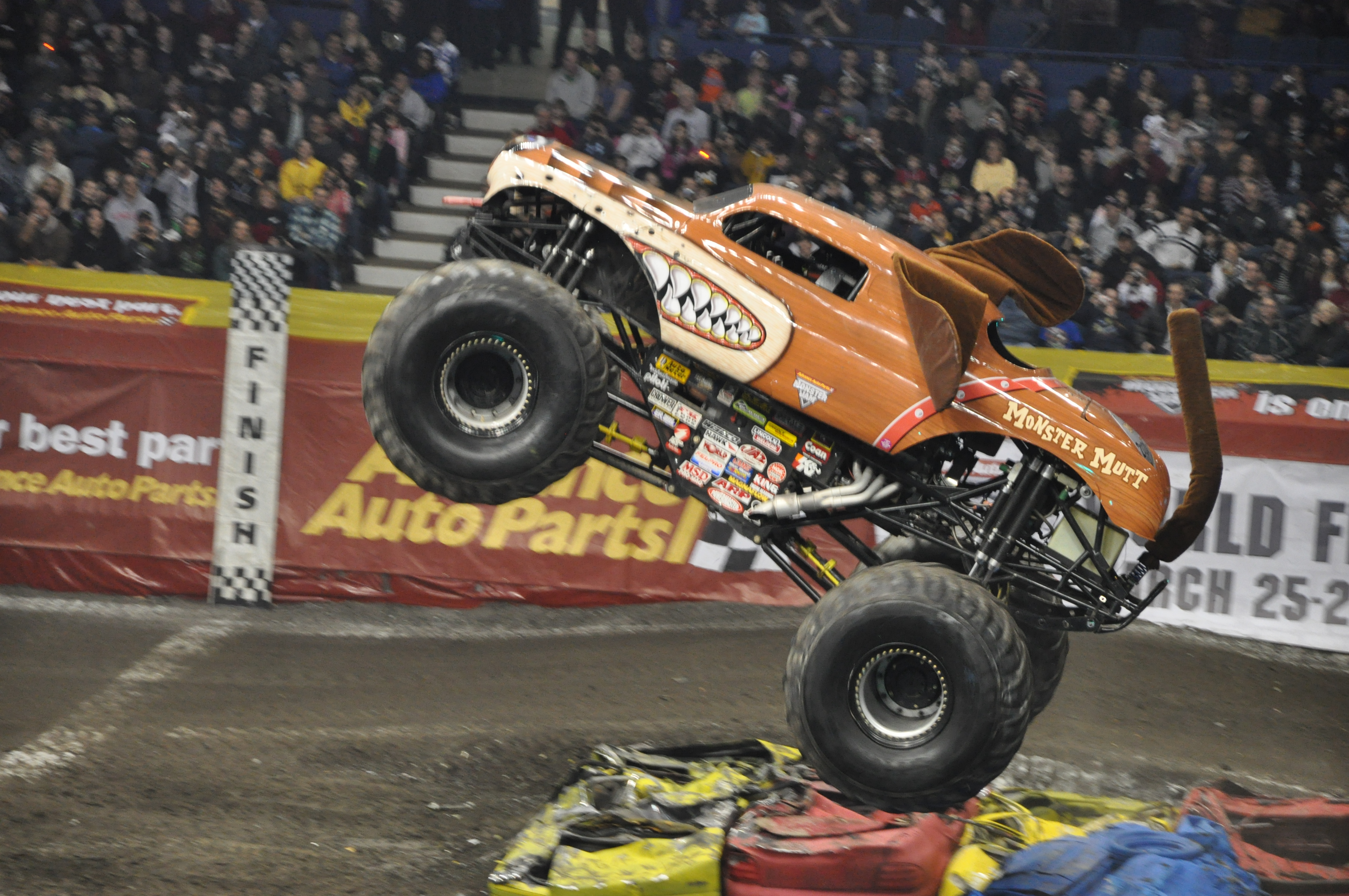

Owner and driver information
- Owner: Feld Motorsports
- Driver(s): Bryce Kenny
- Home city: West Chicago, Illinois

Truck information
- Year created: 2003
- Body style: Custom 3D Dog (formerly 1950 Mercury Street Rod)
- Engine: 540 CI Merlin

Monster Mutt is a monster truck from West Chicago, Illinois, competing in the United States Hot Rod Association (USHRA) Monster Jam series since 2003. Originally styled after a 1950 Mercury, and later a custom body, the truck has a canine motif, complete with big ears, tail and tongue. It is painted in two tones of brown, with a dog mouth drawn in the front. The truck has three spin offs, two of which are currently competing. It is currently driven by Bryce Kenny.

== Truck History ==
Over the years the team has expanded with the addition of the Dalmatian and Rottweiler versions of the truck. It has competed in the World Finals every year since its debut, with Todd Frolik, Bobby Z, Charlie Pauken, all in the brown Mutt, Candice Jolly and Chad Tingler in Mutt Dalmatian, and both trucks will once again compete with Pauken and Jolly driving Monster Mutt and Monster Mutt Dalmatian, respectively. In 2010, Monster Mutt driven by Charlie Pauken on the Grave Digger 22 chassis, went on to win the 2010 Advance Auto Parts NGK Spark Plugs Monster Jam World Finals Freestyle Championship in Las Vegas, Nevada and he got the highest jump of the night. This was Monster Mutt's first ever World Finals Championship.

In 2016, the entire fleet of floppy eared fidos all received facelifts due to the update of the classic Mercury body style, now featuring three-dimensional teeth and real studded collars. A fourth truck, Monster Mutt Junkyard Dog, made its debut, but would be retired in April of the same year.

In 2019, both drivers Kaylyn Migues, and a new athlete Kristen Hope are driving the Dalmatian in 2 Triple Threat Series. Cynthia Gauthier is going to be driving the ice version of the Monster Mutt Dalmatian for a stadium series with 13 other drivers will compete to get an invite to the Monster Jam World finals XX in Camping World Stadium in Orlando, FL. She won the inaugural High Jump challenge with the height of 45.472 feet.

== Other versions ==
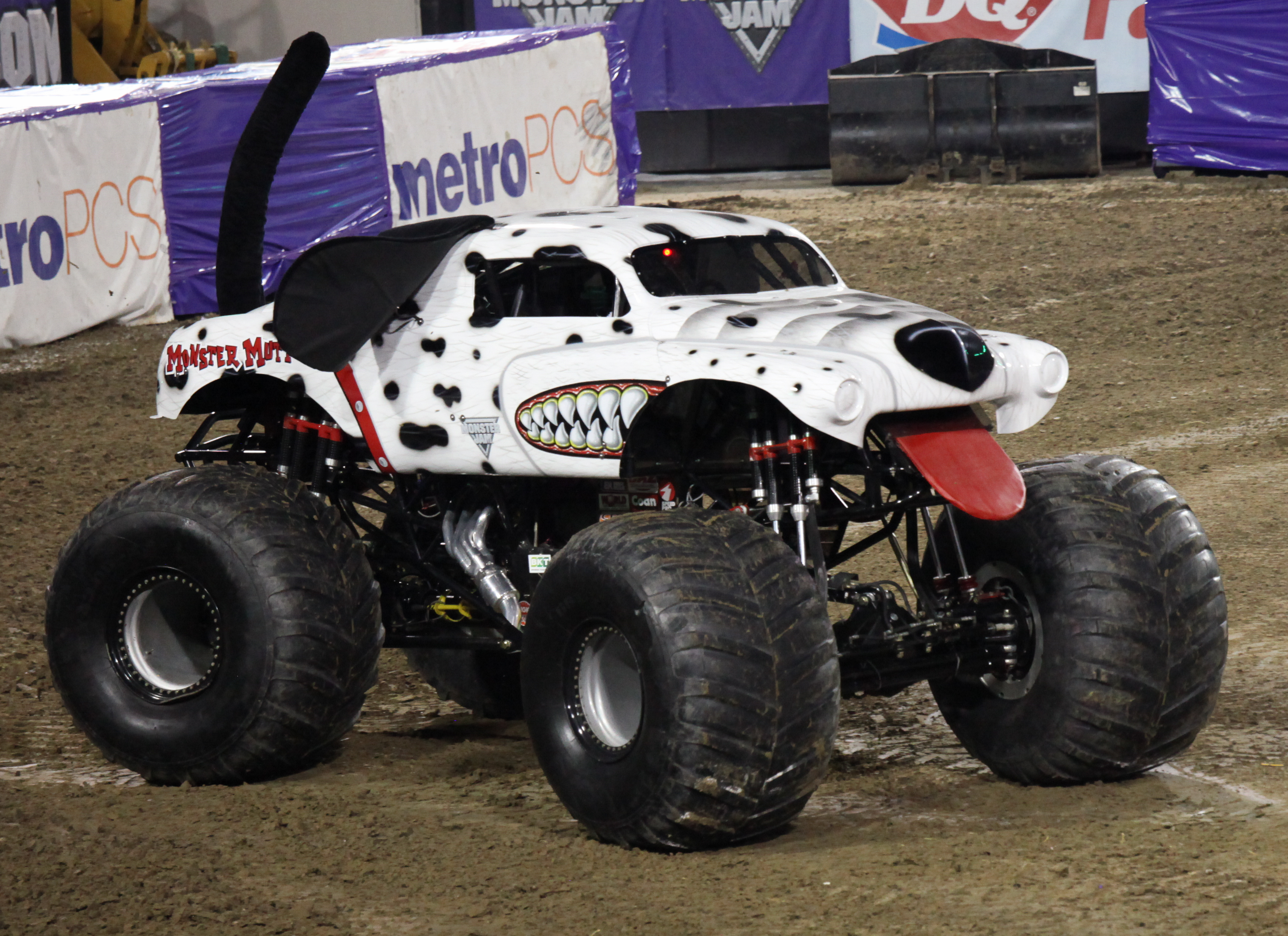

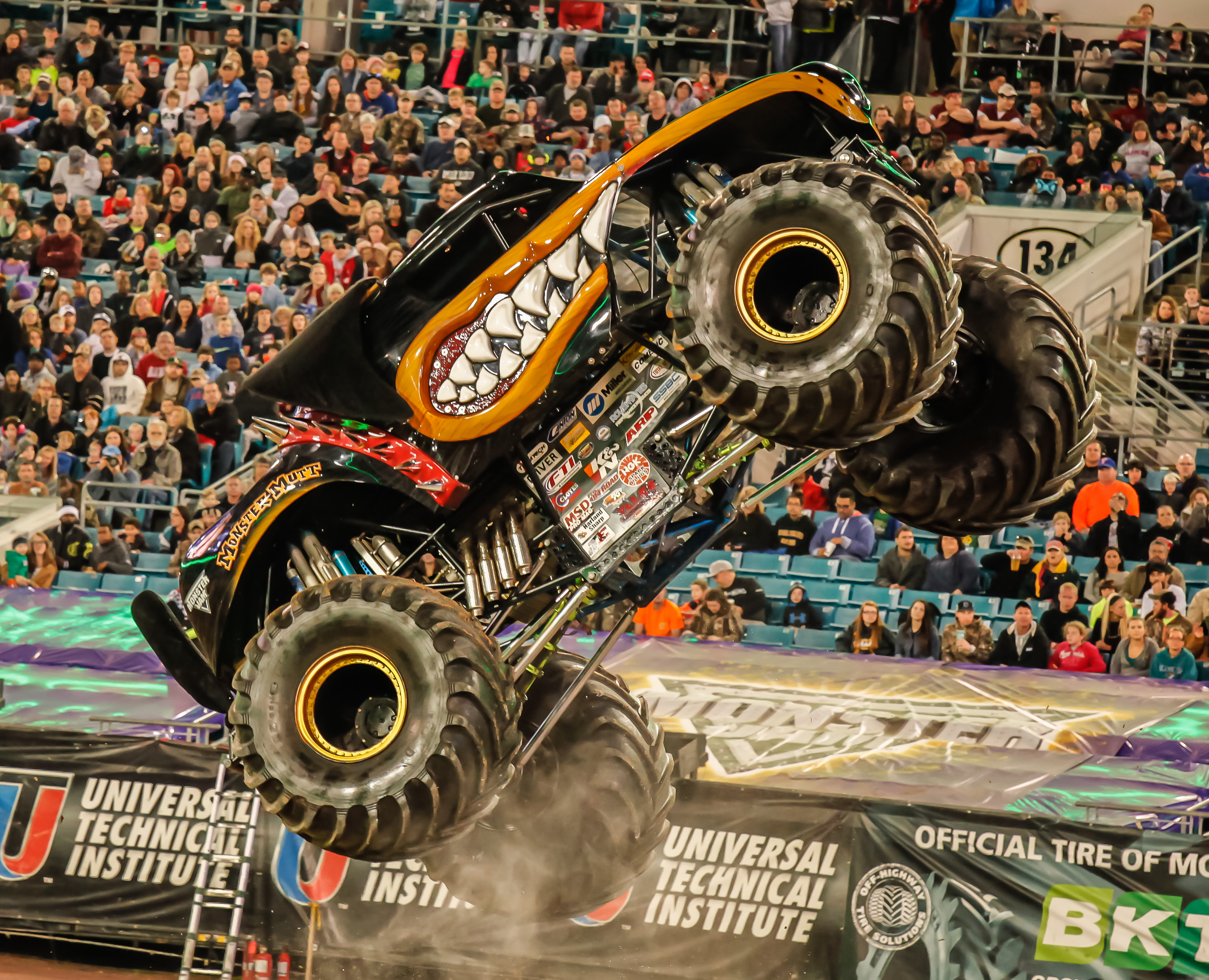
Monster Mutt Dalmatian (Above) and Rottweiler (Bottom)

In the 2007 season, Monster Mutt Dalmatian debuted. The Dalmatians are driven by Candice Jolly and Cynthia Gauthier. Chad Tingler drove it in World Finals 8 and 9.

Candice Jolly started competing in the World Finals since 2009. In 2017 Randy Brown drove the Monster Mutt Dalmatian in the International Tour. Candice Jolly took the Dalmatian to this year's International Tour and Cynthia Gauthier took over for her for one event. For 2019 Cynthia Gauthier is going to compete in the Stadium Series 1 representing the Fire and Ice Version of the Monster Mutt Dalmatian. The same year on the Triple Threat Series Kaylyn Migues will be driving the Dalmatian on the Arena Championship Series as Kristen Hope makes her 2019 debut driving another Dalmatian on the Triple Threat Series.

In 2011, the Rottweiler version of Monster Mutt joined the Original and Dalmatian Mutt. It was piloted for a few years by Charles Benns (the rottweiler monster truck's original driver) and is now driven by former Team Grave Digger superstar Rod Schmidt. In late 2013, the Rottweiler got an aggressive new 3D body design for the 2014 season, that would serve as the inspiration for the other mutt's modern designs. In 2016, to 2019 the Monster Mutt Rottweiler is piloted by other drivers like Cory Snyder, Jack Brown and a few other drivers throughout the last couple of years.

In 2016, The Junkyard Dog version of Monster Mutt was introduced, and was driven by Dustin Brown. Unlike its predecessors, the truck retains the classic Mercury body that Monster Mutt was so famous for, this time with a rusty design. It only competed in that year.

== Ownership ==
Monster Mutt, MM Dalmatian, Ice MM Dalmatian, MM Rottweiler, and MM Junkyard Dog are owned by Feld Entertainment.

== Awards ==
=== Monster Jam World Finals ===
- 2003
1. Driver: Todd Frolik
2. Racing: Lost to Sudden Impact in Round 1
3. Freestyle: Scored 9 - Last
- 2004
1. Driver: Bobby Z
2. Racing: Lost to Maximum Destruction in Round 2
3. Freestyle: Scored 19 - Eighth
- 2005
1. Driver: Bobby Z
2. Racing: Lost to El Toro Loco in Round 2
3. Freestyle: Scored 24 - Tied for Fifth with Superman
- 2006
1. Driver: Charlie Pauken
2. Racing: Lost to Iron Outlaw in Round 2
3. Freestyle: Scored 32 - Third
- 2007
1. Driver: Charlie Pauken
2. Racing: Lost to Batman in the Semi-finals
3. Freestyle: Scored 21 - Tied for Eighth with Blue Thunder and Superman
- 2008
1. Driver: Charlie Pauken
2. Racing: Lost to Maximum Destruction in Round 3
3. Freestyle: Scored 27 - Seventh
- 2009
1. Driver: Charlie Pauken
2. Racing: Lost to Captain's Curse in Round 3
3. Freestyle: Scored 26 - Tied for Fifth with Nitro Circus and Stone Crusher
- 2010
1. Driver: Charlie Pauken
2. Racing: Lost to Bounty Hunter in Round 1
3. Freestyle: Scored 39 - First (Won its world title)
- 2011
1. Driver: Charlie Pauken
2. Racing: Lost to Spider-Man in Round 2
3. Freestyle: Scored 9 - Seventeenth
- 2012
1. Driver: Charlie Pauken
2. Racing: Lost to Spider-Man in Round 1
3. Freestyle: Scored 16 - Tied for Eleventh with Maximum Destruction
- 2013
1. Driver: Charlie Pauken
2. Racing: Lost to El Toro Loco in Round 2
3. Freestyle: Scored 12 - Fourteenth
- 2014
1. Driver: Charlie Pauken
2. Racing: Lost to Wolverine in Round 2
3. Freestyle: Scored 10.5 - Tied for Eighteenth with Bounty Hunter
- 2015
1. Driver: Dustin Brown
2. Racing: Lost to Metal Mulisha in the Semi-finals
3. Freestyle: Scored 22 - Tied for Thirteenth with Avenger
- 2016
1. Driver: Charlie Pauken
2. Racing: Lost to Grave Digger in Round 1
3. Freestyle: Scored 24.5 - Ninth
- 2017
1. Driver: Charlie Pauken
2. Racing: Lost to Tyler Menninga's Grave Digger in Round 1 due to RED LIGHT
3. Freestyle: Scored 5.217 - Thirtieth
- 2018
1. Driver: Cynthia Gauthier
2. Racing: Lost to Gas Monkey Garage in Round 1
3. Freestyle: Scored 6.772 - Seventeenth

== See also ==
- Monster Truck
- List of Monster Trucks
