= The Tale of Tillie's Dragon =

- Film poster and VHS cover
- Directed by: Mike Stribling
- Written by: Mike Stribling
- Produced by: Mike Stribling; Isao Nago
- Starring: Kath Soucie; John Kassir; Wayne Powers; Frank Welker; Randy Rudy; Russi Taylor
- Narrated by: Frank Welker
- Music by: Thomas Chase; Steve Rucker
- Production company: Stribling Productions
- Release dates: September 1995 (Santa Clarita International Film Festival); June 29, 1999 (United States)
- Running time: 44 minutes
- Country: United States
- Language: English

The Tale of Tillie's Dragon is an American animated film directed and written by Mike Stribling and animated by Steven Hahn. The film is about a little girl named Tillie who befriends a playful dragon named Herman. Together the two take part in a variety of adventures, including Tillie's struggle to protect her new friend from the people of her village, who view all dragons as fire-breathing man-eaters in need of extermination. The technical crew on this film featured a variety of former Disney employees.

== Cast ==
- Kath Soucie - Tillie
- John Kassir - Herman
- Wayne Powers - Uncle St. George
- Frank Welker - Mayor Simmons/Narrator
- Randy Rudy - Assistant Mayor Wilner
- Russi Taylor - Pie Lady

== Awards ==
In 1995, The Tale of Tillie's Dragon won an award in the category 'Best Animation Feature Film' and in 2000, director, Mike Stribling, won an award in the Burbank International Children's Film Festival.
