= OMAC =

OMAC can refer to:

- OMAC (Buddy Blank), a DC Comics superhero
- OMAC (comics): a fictional organization of powerful cyborgs in comic books published by DC Comics

- The OMAC Project, a comics miniseries featuring with the OMACs
- Michael Costner, the last remaining OMAC cyborg, chronicled in the 2006 OMAC miniseries

- Old Man's Aircraft Company, a business aircraft company which made several prototypes of the Laser 300 plane in the late 1980s and early 1990s
- One-key MAC, a construction in cryptography
- Order of Malta Ambulance Corps, an Irish first-aid organisation linked to the Sovereign Military Order of Malta
- OMAC (Industry Organization): Organization for Machine Automation and Control
