= The King Family Show =

American TV musical variety series (1965–1966)

- The King Family on the cover of their 1965 Christmas album
- Genre: Musical variety
- Directed by: Marc Breaux
- Starring: The King Sisters, Alvino Rey, Robert Clarke, Tina Cole, Lex de Azevedo, Cam Clarke, Chris Conkling, Ric de Azevedo
- Theme music composer: Richard Rodgers; Oscar Hammerstein II
- Opening theme: "The Sound of Music"
- Country of origin: United States
- Original language: English
- No. of seasons: 2
- No. of episodes: 39

Production
- Executive producer: Nick Vanoff
- Producer: Saul Ilson (1965-66)
- Camera setup: Multi-camera
- Running time: Hour long (Jan-June 1965); Half hour (Sept 1965-Jan 1966); Half hour (1969)
- Production company: KingFam Productions

Original release
- Network: ABC
- Release: January 23, 1965 – September 10, 1969

The King Family Show is an American musical variety series that featured The King Sisters and their extended musical family. The series first aired on ABC from January 23, 1965, to January 8, 1966. The series was revived in 1969, airing from March to September of that year.

== Background and premise ==
After an appearance on The Hollywood Palace in May 1964 drew a reported 53,000 letters, ABC decided to give the Kings their own hour-long special. The Family is King aired on August 29, 1964 to great ratings. More letters poured into ABC and the King Family was given their own hour-long weekly musical variety series (replacing The Outer Limits), debuting on Saturday, January 23, 1965 (the King Family made a third Hollywood Palace appearance a week before the debut of their own series in order to promote it). Bing Crosby introduced the premiere episode. The series was full of songs from Broadway, film, The Great American Songbook and contemporary pop hits of the day. The show starred the Grammy nominated vocal group The King Sisters (Yvonne, Alyce, Luise and Marilyn), along with their husbands, siblings, and children and The Alvino Rey Orchestra. In all, some thirty-nine members of the King family, ranging in age from seven months to 79 years, appeared on the show. Yvonne King's daughter Tina Cole, later featured on My Three Sons, also regularly appeared. At the beginning of the series, King Family patriarch William King Driggs appeared in every episode, but suffered a stroke on set and died a week later on April 6, 1965.

The series crew consisted of director and choreographer Marc Breaux with choreographer Dee Dee Wood (known for Mary Poppins and The Sound of Music) and costumer Bob Mackie. This series was Bob Mackie's first credit on his own.

While the show was somewhat successful in its initial season, the network trimmed it to a half-hour on September 18, 1965 and the ratings declined—up against Jackie Gleason on CBS and I Dream of Jeannie on NBC—but the show did inspire an intensely loyal following. One letter to ABC enthused, "the King Family was beautiful, talented, and completely entertaining. We are buying [the sponsor's products] Wisk and Clairol tomorrow." Still, the show was cancelled in January 1966.

Season One consisted of 22 hour-long episodes from January to June 1965. Season Two consisted of 17 half-hour episodes from September 1965 to January 1966.

During the run of the initial show in 1965, Warner Bros. Records released six albums, The King Family Show, The King Family Album, The King Family Live! In the Round, Christmas with the King Family, Sunday with the King Family, and The New Sounds of the Fabulous King Sisters.

=== Members of families ===
- Yvonne "Vonnie" King Burch and her daughters Tina Cole & Cathy Cole (their father is pianist/organist Buddy Cole)
- Alyce King Clarke and husband Robert Clarke with their sons Lex de Azevedo, Ric de Azevedo and Cam Clarke
- Luise King Rey and husband Alvino Rey with their daughter Liza Rey and sons Rob and Jon Rey
- Marilyn King and husband Kent Larsen with their children Susannah & Adam Lloyd and Jennifer Larsen
- Donna Conkling and husband Jim Conkling and their 5 children Candy, Jamie, Chris Conkling, Xan, and Laurette
- Maxine Thomas and husband LaVarn with their daughter Carolyn and son Tom
- Karleton King Driggs and wife Hazel (the only brunette on the show) and their sons Don, Bill, and Ray
- William King Driggs, Jr. and wife Phyllis with their children Stephen, Debbie, and Jonathan

== Revival ==
After observing the successes of the King Family syndicated television specials, in March 1969, after the extremely controversial program Turn-On was cancelled after a single airing, ABC brought back a somewhat pared-down version of the King Family Show that focused on a sub-group of the family, the Four King Cousins (which consisted of family members Tina and sister Cathy Cole, and their cousins Candy Brand and Carolyn Cameron). This new color half-hour program occupied the Wednesday 8:30-9:00 timeslot until September of that year. 13 episodes were produced and aired from March 12 thru June 11, 1969 then the entire run of the series was repeated from June 18 until September 10, 1969.

== Television specials ==
The King Family began producing their own syndicated holiday specials beginning with Thanksgiving with the King Family, which first aired on November 19, 1967. In all, the King Family produced 17 specials from 1964 to 1974:

=== List of television specials ===
- The Family Is King (1964) (ABC)
- Thanksgiving with the King Family (1967) (syndicated & repeated annually until 1972)
- Christmas with the King Family (1967) (syndicated & repeated annually until 1972)
- Valentine's Day with the King Family (1968) (syndicated & repeated annually until 1972)
- Easter with the King Family (1968) (syndicated & repeated annually until 1972)
- Mother's Day with the King Family (1968) (syndicated & repeated annually until 1973)
- September with the King Family (1968) (syndicated & repeated annually until 1973)
- October with the King Family (1968) (syndicated & repeated annually until 1973)
- January with the King Family (1969) (syndicated & repeated annually until 1973)
- Holiday Cruise with the King Family (1969) (syndicated & repeated annually until 1974)
- June with the King Family (1969) (syndicated & repeated annually until 1974)
- Backstage with the King Family (1969) (syndicated & repeated in 1970)
- Back Home with the King Family (1969) (syndicated & repeated annually until 1973)
- The King Family in Washington, D.C. (1971)
- The King Family in San Francisco (1971)
- The King Family in Atlanta (1971)
- Home for the Holidays with the King Family (1974) (syndicated & repeated annually until 1976)
- Christmas with the King Family Reunion Special (2009) (PBS special)

== Unaired pilots ==
- The King Family & Friends (1969)
- The King Family Circle (1970) (2 episodes taped)
- Those Were the Days (1970) (2 episodes taped)

== Discography ==
The King Family recorded albums that reflected the songs presented in the shows. Some of the albums were balanced out with performers regularly associated with the television show.

- Fanny Farmer Presents: The King Family Christmas Album (Fleetwood, 1964)
- Christmas with the King Family (Warner Bros., 1965)
- The King Family Show (Warner Bros., 1965); abridged reissue: Our Favorite Things (Harmony, 1970)
- The King Family Album (Warner Bros., 1965)
- Live! In the Round with Robert Clarke and Alvino Rey (Warner Bros., 1966)
- A King Family Christmas (Fleetwood, 1968)
