= Cam Clarke =

American voice actor

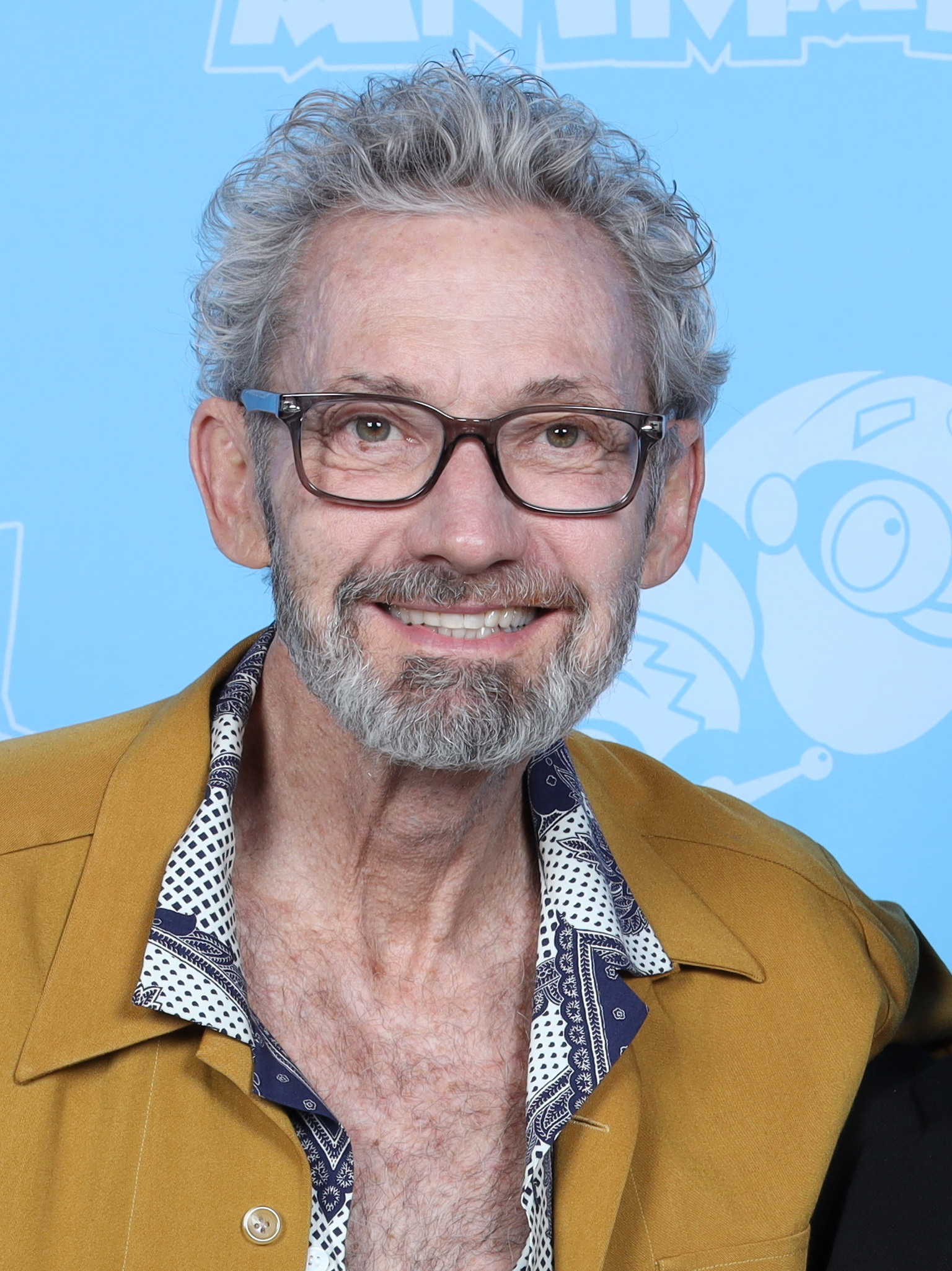
- Clarke at Animate! Columbus in 2024
- Other names: James Flinders; Jimmy Flinders; Kelly Brewster; Cameron Charles; Cam Clark; Clark Kelly; Adam Nevel
- Occupation: Voice actor
- Years active: 1973–present
- Agent: Sutton, Barth and Vennari
- Family: Lex de Azevedo (half-brother); Alvino Rey (uncle); Pat Fraley (cousin); Buddy Cole (uncle); Tina Cole (cousin)
- Website: camclarke.com

Cam Clarke is an American voice actor, known for his work in animation, video games, and commercials. Among his notable roles are Leonardo and Rocksteady in the 1987 Teenage Mutant Ninja Turtles animated series, Shotaro Kaneda in the 1989 original Streamline Pictures English dub of Akira, and Liquid Snake in the Metal Gear series. He often serves as a voice double for Matthew Broderick and served as Broderick's singing voice of Simba in The Lion King II: Simba's Pride.

== Career ==
Clarke began his acting career in The Hollywood Palace as The King Family Show. He continued to perform with his family on various television specials until the 1980s when he got his first voice acting roles in Snorks and Robotech. He was taught by Michael Bell.

To date, Clarke has voiced over four hundred titles. From 1987 until 1996, Cam Clarke would most notably portray Leonardo, the leader of the Teenage Mutant Ninja Turtles as well as Rocksteady, one of the show's antagonists. Clarke would reprise the role of Leonardo in non-musical spoken portions of the first show of the TMNT: Coming Out of Their Shells concerts designed around the Ninja Turtle characters held at Radio City Music Hall, though the later VHS tape released of the event leaves him uncredited.

== Personal life ==
Clarke is the nephew to guitarist Alvino Rey and pianist Buddy Cole, cousin to actress Tina Cole, actor and TMNT co-star Pat Fraley, and writer Chris Conkling, half brother to musicians Ric and Lex de Azevedo, and uncle to voice actress Emilie Brown and actress Rachel Coleman.

Clarke is gay, and his experiences inspired his album Inside Out, which changed pronouns in lyrics of classic songs and his one-man autobiographical play Stop Me If I Told You This.

Clarke is a survivor of HIV, having lived with it for decades.

== Filmography ==
=== Animation ===
Year	Title	Role	Notes	Source
1973	Butch Cassidy and the Sundance Kids	Additional Voices		
1987–90	Dino-Riders	Ikon, Aero, Krok, Additional voices		
1987–96	Teenage Mutant Ninja Turtles	Leonardo, Rocksteady, additional voices	Main role	
1988	Snoopy! The Musical	Snoopy (speaking and singing)	TV special	
1988	Denver, the Last Dinosaur	Mario, Shades	Main role	
1989	The California Raisins Show	Beebop		
1989	This Is America, Charlie Brown	Snoopy (singing voice)	Episode: "The Music and Heroes of America:	
1990–91	TaleSpin	Daring Dan Dawson		
1990–91	Attack of the Killer Tomatoes	Igor Smith		
1991–93, 1995	Captain Planet and the Planeteers	Ooze, additional voices		
1991–92	Space Cats	Additional voices		
1991–93	Mr. Bogus	Mr. Bogus	Main role	
1992–97	Eek! The Cat	Puffy, Wuz Wuz, Huckleberry, Voice on Radio, Reindeer, Elves, TV Announcer, Additional voices	Also The Terrible Thunderlizards	
1994	Aladdin	Man	Episode: "Getting the Bugs Out"	
1994–96	The Tick	Die Fledermaus	Main role	
1995–97	The Mask: Animated Series	Putty Thing		
1995–97	The Twisted Tales of Felix the Cat	Poindexter		
1995–97	Gargoyles	Gillecomgain (Young), Quarryman, Maxwell, Brendan		
1995	Space Strikers			
1995–96	Timon & Pumbaa	Simba (speaking voice)		
1996	Quack Pack	Gustav Goose		
1997	The Spooktacular New Adventures of Casper	The Prince, Various voices		
1997	Spider-Man: The Animated Series	Mister Fantastic	2 episodes	
1997	Superman: The Animated Series	Sid Melkin, Thug	2 episodes	
1998	Cow and Chicken	Additional voices		
1998	Oh Yeah! Cartoons	Jones, Shred, Blade	Episode: "Microcops"	
1998	KaBlam!	Additional voices	Episode: "Jetcat"	
1998–99	Mad Jack the Pirate	Sternly Ed Nerwood, Tolouse, Gnome, Arturo Caliente, additional voices		
1999–2000	Pepper Ann	Stuart Walldinger, additional voices	10 episodes	
2000–03	Clifford the Big Red Dog	Mac, Mark Howard, Mr. Dink, Ad Announcer, K.C.		
2001	House of Mouse	Simba		
2002–04	He-Man and the Masters of the Universe	Prince Adam/He-Man, King Grayskull	Main role	
2002	Justice League	Paramedic	Episode: "A Knight of Shadows"	
2002	Totally Spies!	Brock Williams	Episode: "A Spy is Born"	
2003–05	The Grim Adventures of Billy & Mandy	Melvin, various voices		
2003–05	Clifford's Puppy Days	Mark Howard		
2004	Megas XLR	Bot #32, Bot No. 101	Episode: "A Clockwork Megas"	
2005–08	The Zula Patrol	Captain Bula, Multo, Pluto, Saturn		
2005–06	W.I.T.C.H.	Dean Collins	6 episodes	
2006	Avatar: The Last Airbender	Lao Bei Fong	Episode: "The Blind Bandit"	
2007–10	Roary the Racing Car	Additional Voices	Main role	
2007–11	Back at the Barnyard	Freddy, additional voices	Main role, 52 episodes	
2008	The Land Before Time	Bron	Episode: "The Big Longneck Test"	
2009	Olivia	King		
2009	Terminator Salvation: The Machinima Series	Laz Howard, Helicopter Pilot, additional voices	Main role	
2009–12	Special Agent Oso	Whirly Bird, R.R. Rapide	Main role	
2010, 2012	The Avengers: Earth's Mightiest Heroes	Doc Samson, Constrictor, Vector		
2011	Star Wars: The Clone Wars	O-Mer	2 episodes	
2012	Ultimate Spider-Man	Piledriver, Captain Ultra	Episode: "Damage"	
2013	Avengers Assemble	Piledriver	Episode: "Avengers: Impossible"	
2014, 2016–17	Teenage Mutant Ninja Turtles	80s Leonardo, 80's Rocksteady		
2014	Rainbow Brite	Murky Dismal, Red Butler		
2016–19	The Lion Guard	Mwoga		
2021	High Guardian Spice	Sorrel, Neppy Cat	3 episodes	
2024	Masters of the Universe: Revolution	Stonedar		

=== Anime dubbing ===
Year	Title	Role	Notes	Source
1985	Robotech	Max Sterling, Lance "Lancer" Belmont	as Jimmy Flinders	
1986	Macron 1	Jason Templar	as Jimmy Flinders	
1987–95	G-Force: Guardians of Space	Dirk Daring, Red Impulse		
1987	Saber Rider and the Star Sheriffs	Additional voices		
1995	Doomed Megalopolis	Junichi Narutaki	Streamline Pictures dub	
2004	Duel Masters	Toru, Shori, Stu: Game Announcer #2		
2007–09, 2013–14	Bleach	Yasochika Iemura, Kageoza Inaba	as Adam Nevel	
2007	Naruto	Aoi Rokushō, Suien	5 episodes and OVA episode: "Mission: Protect the Waterfall Village!"	
2009	Honey and Clover	Takumi Mayama		
2010	Monster	Richard Braun		
2011–12	Marvel Anime: X-Men	Professor X		
2012–14	Monsuno	Chase Suno, Jeredy Suno, Dr. Emmanuel Klipse, additional voices		
2013	Zetman	Gorou Kanzaki	as Adam Nevel	
2017–18	Fate/Apocrypha	Caster of Black		
2017–19	March Comes In like a Lion	Masachika Kōda		
2018	Hunter × Hunter	Peggy	2011 series	
2018	Jojo's Bizarre Adventure	Daniel J. D'Arby/D'Arby Elder	Television series	
2018	Saint Seiya: The Lost Canvas	Pope Sage		
2018–19	Hero Mask	Connor, Fred Faraday	Netflix dub	
2019	The Promised Neverland	Demon, Demon B		
2020	Cagaster of an Insect Cage	Tariq		
2021	Super Crooks	Gladiator		
2022	Bleach: Thousand-Year Blood War	Yasochika Iemura	Episode: "The Shooting Star Project (Zero Mix)"	
2023	Pluto	Goji		

=== Films ===
==== Feature films ====
Year	Title	Role	Notes	Source
1983	The Smurfs and the Magic Flute	Peewit	English dub	
1985	Warriors of the Wind	Prince Milo	English dub	
1988	Peter-No-Tail in Americat	Peter-No-Tail	English dub	
1989	Akira	Shōtarō Kaneda, Councilman, Scientist	Streamline English dub; credited as Jimmy Flinders	
2004	Clifford's Really Big Movie	Mark Howard, Marcus		
2006	Barnyard	Freddy the Ferret		
2007	Underdog	Supershep, Little Brown Dog		
2008	The Pirates Who Don't Do Anything: A VeggieTales Movie	Robert the Terrible, The King		
2008	Fly Me to the Moon	Ray		
2009	Tales of the Black Freighter	Money Lender		
2010	A Turtle's Tale: Sammy's Adventures	Seagull		
2012	Total Recall	Terminal Announcer		
2012	A Turtle's Tale 2: Sammy's Escape from Paradise	Seagull		
2012	ParaNorman	Blithe Hollow Townspeople		
2022	Suzume	Hitsujirō Munakata		
2025	Dog Man	Indifferent Shop		

==== Direct-to-video and television films ====
Year	Title	Role	Notes	Source
1998	The New Adventures of Peter Rabbit	Peter Rabbit		
1998	Scooby-Doo on Zombie Island	Beau Neville		
1998	The Lion King II: Simba's Pride	Simba (singing voice)		
1999	The Nuttiest Nutcracker	Prince		
2000	The Little Mermaid II: Return to the Sea	Flounder		
2000	Grandma Got Run Over by a Reindeer	Austin Bucks		
2004	Naruto the Movie: Ninja Clash in the Land of Snow	Sōsetsu Kazahana	English dub	
2007	Mosaic	Stephan		
2007	Bleach: The DiamondDust Rebellion	Yasochika Iemura	English dub	
2012	Monster High: Why Do Ghouls Fall in Love?	Heath Burns, Mr. Rotter, Hep Clouds, Valentine's Mother		
2012	Monster High: Escape from Skull Shores	Heath Burns, Ghost		
2012	Monster High: Ghouls Rule	Heath Burns, Mr. Rotter, Goon		
2013	Monster High: Friday Night Frights	Heath Burns, Romulus		
2013	Monster High - Scaris: City of Frights	Heath Burns, Mr. Rotter		
2013	Monster High: 13 Wishes	Heath Burns		
2013	Lego Batman: The Movie – DC Super Heroes Unite	Green Lantern, Martian Manhunter		Also voice director
2014	Monster High: Frights, Camera, Action!	Heath Burns, Mr. Rotter, Ygor, Hoodude Voodoo, Vampire Dignitary, Crow		
2014	Monster High: Freaky Fusion	Heath Burns, Mr. Rotter, Hoodude Voodoo		
2015	Monster High: Haunted	Heath Burns, Mr. Rotter, Hoodude Voodoo, Ghost Student		
2015	Monster High: Boo York, Boo York	Heath Burns, Mr. Rotter, Hoodude Voodoo		
2019	Lego DC Batman: Family Matters	Brother Eye, Bat Computer		

=== Video games ===
Year	Title	Role	Notes	Source
1990	Rise of the Dragon	William Blade Hunter		
1991	Spider-Man vs. The Kingpin	Doctor Octopus		
1992	Zombie Dinos from Planet Zeltoid	Dexter the Dinodroid		
1993	Quest for Glory: Shadows of Darkness	Domovoi, Gypsy Davy, Nikolai		
1994	Freddy Pharkas: Frontier Pharmacist	Freddy Pharkas	CD-ROM version	
1997	Outlaws	Sam Fulton		
1997	The X-Fools: The Spoof is Out There	Rex Mully		
1998	Xenogears	Krelian		
1998	Metal Gear Solid	Liquid Snake, Master Miller	English version; credited as James Flinders	
1999	Star Wars: X-Wing Alliance	Galin Azzameen, Rebel Officer, Civilian Officer		
1999	Revenant	Moorcock, Gus, Townsmen		
2000	Clifford the Big Red Dog: Learning Activities	Mac, Victor, Pedro		
2000	Sword of the Berserk: Guts' Rage	Puck		
2000	Alundra 2	Pierre/Pirate 1/Madd Flower	English dub	
2000	Baldur's Gate II: Shadows of Amn	Drizzt Do'Urden, Aran Linvail, additional voices		
2000	Escape from Monkey Island	Clive the Jambalaya Tourist, Meathook		
2000	Grandia II	Ryudo, Father Carius, Risotto		
2001	The Lion King: Simba's Mighty Adventure	Simba		
2001	Metal Gear Solid 2: Sons of Liberty	Liquid Snake		
2001	Baldur's Gate: Dark Alliance	Fayed, Vahn, additional voices		
2002	EOE: Eve of Extinction	Josh Calloway	English dub	
2002	Eternal Darkness	Anthony, Custodian		
2003	Star Wars: Knights of the Old Republic	Trask Ulgo		
2003	Tales of Symphonia	Kratos Aurion		
2003	The Hobbit	Additional voices		
2004	Metal Gear Solid: The Twin Snakes	Liquid Snake, Master Miller		
2004	La Pucelle: Tactics	Yattanya	English dub	
2004	Call of Duty: United Offensive	Pvt. Anderson, Sasha, additional voices		
2004	Shark Tale	Eel Boss, Teen Fish, Paper Sales Fish		
2005	He-Man: Defender of Grayskull	He-Man, Sphinx		
2005	Shadow of Rome	Marcus Brutus		
2005	Champions: Return to Arms	Additional voices		
2005	Jade Empire	Sky, Si Pat, additional voices		
2005	Killer7	Andrei Ulmeyda	English dub	
2005	The Incredible Hulk: Ultimate Destruction	Additional voices		
2005	Kingdom of Paradise	Kairoku, Hokaku	English dub	
2005	Yakuza	Takashi		
2006	Kingdom Hearts II	Simba	English dub	
2006	Just Cause	Kleiner		
2006	The Lord of the Rings: The Battle for Middle-earth II	King Arveleg	The Rise of the Witch-king expansion	
2006	Tales of Legendia	Will Raynard	English dub	
2006	The Grim Adventures of Billy & Mandy	Melvin		
2006	Marvel: Ultimate Alliance	Thor, Daredevil, Weasel		
2007	God of War II	Hercules	Scrapped in final version but is still credited	
2008	The Spiderwick Chronicles	Thimbletack, Knocker		
2008	Naruto: The Broken Bond	Aoi	English dub	
2009	Halo Wars	Flamethrower		
2009	Dragon Age: Origins	Herren, Kendrick	also Awakening expansion	
2009	Scooby-Doo! First Frights	Coach Hayes, Costington, Tim Toiler		
2009	Assassin's Creed II	Subject Sixteen		
2010	Final Fantasy XIII	Cocoon Inhabitants	English dub	
2010	Lost Planet 2	Additional voices	English dub	
2010	Clash of the Titans	Fisherman, Soldiers, Spirits		
2010	Megamind: Ultimate Showdown	Lance Lafontaine		
2010	Crackdown 2	Additional voices		
2010	Assassin's Creed: Brotherhood	Subject Sixteen		
2011	Shadows of the Damned	Christopher, Demons		
2011	Fallout: New Vegas	Dr. Mobius	Old World Blues DLC	
2011	Dead Island	Roger Howard		
2011	Star Wars: The Old Republic	Bloodworthy, Geris Paelid		
2012	Final Fantasy XIII-2	Cocoon Inhabitants	English dub	
2012	Kingdoms of Amalur: Reckoning	Additional voices		
2012	Lego Batman 2: DC Super Heroes	Green Lantern, Martian Manhunter, Nightwing		Also voice director
2012	Guild Wars 2	Al'batubar		
2012	Lego The Lord of the Rings	Various different characters in Middle Earth	Credited under Voice Talent	
2013	Sly Cooper: Thieves in Time	Monkey Guard		
2013	Final Fantasy XIV: A Realm Reborn	Lord Lolorito Nanarito	English dub	
2013	Armored Core: Verdict Day	The Foundation Man, CPU Voice	English dub, as Cam Clark	
2014	Teenage Mutant Ninja Turtles: Brothers Unite	Leonardo, Rocksteady		
2014	Teenage Mutant Ninja Turtles	Leonardo		
2014	Lightning Returns: Final Fantasy XIII	Fleeing Man, Resident, Goddess's Disciple	English dub	
2014	WildStar	Chua		
2014	Skylanders: Trap Team	Blobbers		
2014	Super Smash Bros. for Nintendo 3DS / Wii U	Corrin (Male)	Added in February 2016	
2015	Til Morning's Light	Ghost Antagonist		
2015	Skylanders: SuperChargers	Additional voices		
2016	He-Man: Tappers of Grayskull	He-Man / Prince Adam		
2016	Fire Emblem Fates	Corrin	English dub	
2016	Bravely Second: End Layer	Kaiser Oblivion	English dub	
2016	Enter the Gungeon	Agunim		
2017	Fire Emblem Heroes	Corrin (Male), Arthur (Fates)	English dub	
2018	Spyro Reignited Trilogy	Cosmos, Agent Zero		
2018	Super Smash Bros. Ultimate	Corrin (Male)	Archive audio	
2019	Shenmue III	Sun JiuSi		
2021	Nickelodeon All-Star Brawl	Leonardo	Voiceover added in the June 2022 update	
2022	Teenage Mutant Ninja Turtles: Shredder's Revenge	Leonardo, Rocksteady		
2022	Nickelodeon Kart Racers 3: Slime Speedway	Leonardo		
2023	Disney Dreamlight Valley	Simba		
2024	Nickelodeon All-Star Brawl 2	Rocksteady	Rocksteady voiceover added on July 3, 2024 update	

=== Live-action ===
Year	Title	Role	Notes	Source
1996	Tales from the Crypt	Dudley Pig, Bailiff Wolf (voice)	Episode: "The Third Pig"	
1997	Walker, Texas Ranger	A.R.T. (voice)	Episode: "Brainchild"	
1997	Troops	Jyanix Bach		
2005–2007	Flip That House	Narrator		
2016	Hawaii Five-0	Jack Lord	Episode: "Makaukau 'oe e Pa'ani?"	

=== Audio books ===
- The Mystery of Smuggler's Cove (1985) Hardy Boys

=== Theater ===
- Noah: The Musical – Citizen of Land of Nod
- Stop Me If I Told You This – Himself

=== Other ===
- The Dark Crystal – Jen (read-along cassette story recording)
- "The World of Snoopy" – Snoopy (animatronic toy and read-along cassette series)
- Circle of Life: An Environmental Fable – Simba
- American Psycho – FanMoy

== Staff work ==
- Christmas with the King Family – Consulting producer
- Labyrinth of Crete – Casting director
- Rachel & the TreeSchoolers – Casting director

== Discography ==
- Inside Out (1999)
- Return to Pride Rock: Songs Inspired by Disney's The Lion King II: Simba's Pride
- Saturday's Warrior (Original Cast Recording) (1978)
