= Turn-On =

American surreal sketch comedy series

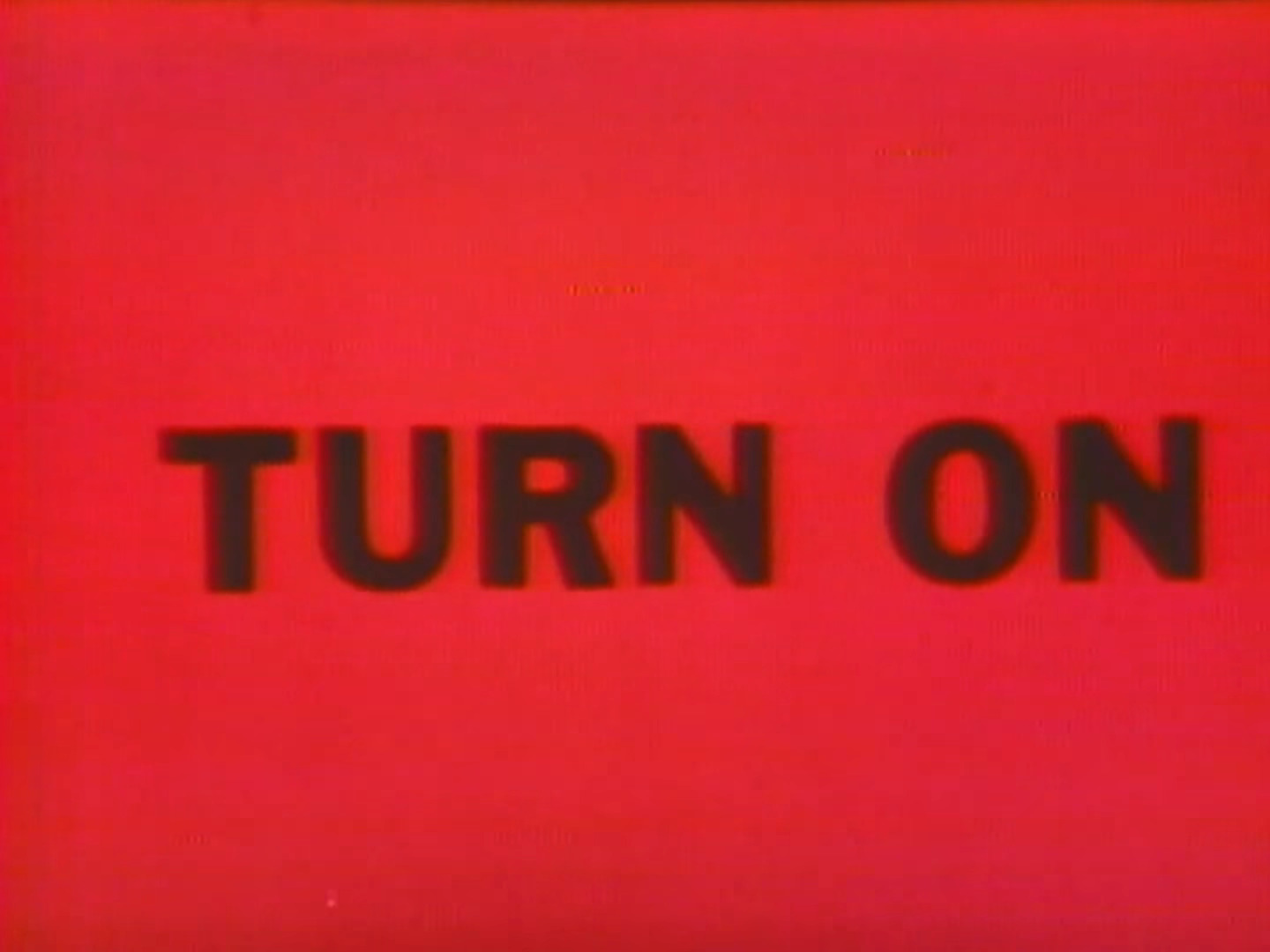
- Title card from first episode
- Genre: Sketch comedy; Science fiction; Surreal comedy
- Created by: Digby Wolfe; George Schlatter
- Presented by: Tim Conway (guest host)
- Starring: Tim Conway; Teresa Graves; Hamilton Camp; Mel Stewart; Chuck McCann; Bonnie Boland; Maxine Greene; Ken Greenwald; Debbie Macomber; Maura McGiveney; Robert Staats; Cecile Ozorio
- Country of origin: United States
- Original language: English
- No. of episodes: 3 (2 episodes unaired)

Production
- Executive producers: Ed Friendly; George Schlatter
- Producer: Digby Wolfe
- Running time: 30 minutes
- Production company: George Schlatter-Ed Friendly Productions

Original release
- Network: ABC
- Release: February 5, 1969

Turn-On is an American surreal sketch comedy series created by Digby Wolfe and George Schlatter that aired once on ABC on Wednesday, February 5, 1969. Only one episode was shown before being pulled from ABC's schedule, leaving another episode unaired. The show has since been considered one of the most infamous flops in TV history, with significantly low initial ratings and negative critical reception.

Schlatter and Ed Friendly, who had previously been the producers of Rowan & Martin's Laugh-In, were contracted by Bristol-Myers to develop the show, and provided it to ABC for a projected 13-week run after it was rejected by NBC and CBS. Turn-On's sole broadcast episode replaced the Wednesday episode of Peyton Place – a fact referenced on the show itself, where, in the opening, Tim Conway refers to the show as "Peyton Re-Place". Conway was the first episode's guest host, and also participated in certain sketches. Among the cast were Teresa Graves (who would join the Laugh-In cast that fall), Hamilton Camp, and Chuck McCann. The writing staff included Albert Brooks. Urban legends by Conway and Schlatter claimed Turn-On was cancelled during the episode by affiliates; while this did not happen, multiple stations protested to ABC after it aired, screened it at a later timeslot, or refused to air it altogether.

== Premise ==
The first and only aired episode of Turn-On

Turn-On's premise was that it was "the first computerized TV show", according to its opening sequence; the show had no sets except for a clinical white backdrop, where sketches generated by an artificially intelligent computer would be acted out. Unlike the generally appealing humor of Laugh-In, Turn-On was oriented around off-color humor and "focused almost exclusively on sex as a comedic subject", using various rapid-fire jokes and risqué skits. Co-creator and production executive Digby Wolfe described it as a "visual, comedic, sensory assault involving animation, videotape, stop-action film, electronic distortion, computer graphics—even people."

Sounds created with Moog synthesizers were used in lieu of a laugh track, representing the computer's laughter. The program was also filmed instead of presented live or on videotape; in a style of presentation that was novel for the time, several sketches and jokes were presented with the screen divided into four squares resembling comic strip panels. The production credits of the episode were inserted at random intervals after the first commercial break, instead of conventionally at the beginning or end.

== Reaction ==
When initially presented to CBS, a network official stated that Turn-On was "so fast with the cuts and chops that some of our people actually got physically disturbed by it." Tim Conway has stated that Turn-On was canceled midway through its only episode, so that the party that the cast and crew held for its premiere as the show aired across the United States also marked its cancellation. A native of Cleveland, Ohio, Conway later claimed that the Cleveland ABC affiliate, WEWS-TV, replaced the show after the first commercial break and utilized an "emergency protocol" of a black screen with live organ music.

Ten minutes into Turn-On, WEWS general manager Donald Perris called ABC's headquarters by telephone to notify them that they would no longer air the show and sent to ABC president Elton Rule an angry telegram: "If your naughty little boys have to write dirty words on the walls, please don't use our walls. Turn-On is turned off, as far as WEWS is concerned. You tried too hard." After the program aired, a WEWS spokesman claimed that the station's switchboard was "lit up" with protest calls, and Perris derided Turn-On as being "in excessive poor taste". George Schlatter would later accuse Perris of actively lobbying other affiliates prior to the broadcast to force a network cancellation after objecting to it replacing Peyton Place on the Wednesday night schedule. However, Perris told The Cleveland Press that neither he nor the station's then-current program director, Ernest Sindelar, had a chance to preview the show prior to broadcast, saying that:

It was previewed by a member of our staff whose judgment is usually good. Last night it wasn't very good. The show shouldn't have gone on. It's all right to be racy—but this was just plain dirty. This was a hate show. Its spirit was dirty. I watched it at home and I felt very bad that it was on.

At the same time, WAKR-TV in Akron, Ohio—the Cleveland market's other primary ABC affiliate—did not receive any negative phone calls but their general manager criticized the show's "questionable taste".

Several stations in the eastern time zones refused to air Turn-On before its premiere, including Memphis, Tennessee's WHBQ-TV, which refused to air the series because the management felt that it was "not up to our broadcast standards for that time of evening". The station quickly replaced it with an episode of The Real McCoys. After seeing the episode, several stations in the later western time zones decided not to broadcast the show at all, including Portland, Oregon's KATU, Seattle, Washington's KOMO-TV, and Denver, Colorado's KBTV. KATU's management stated their belief that certain portions of the program "are not in good taste and that these portions would be objectionable to a substantial and responsible part of the community." Viewers of Little Rock, Arkansas's KATV, which disliked the show but decided to air it, "jam[med] the station's switchboard" with complaints. Dallas, Texas, ABC affiliate WFAA-TV elected to air the show on the following Sunday night at 10:30 local time, to an overwhelmingly negative response.

Both The New York Times and the Associated Press gave the show poor reviews, as did Bill Barrett, who was the TV critic for the Cleveland Press. Barrett remarked that "it appears to have proven one point: a television program needs more than shock-and-sex content to be attractive. It has to have taste and style. Turn-On lacked it last night. For all its special effects of split screen, psycho lights and electronic throbbing, it was merely a half-hour of vulgar little snickers." An ABC executive stated that "creatively, Turn-On didn't work". He compared the show negatively to the comedy of Dean Martin, Laugh-In, and the Smothers Brothers, which the executive described as "absolutely beyond belief ... awfully blue", but were popular and less controversial because unlike Turn-On, "they're funny".

== Cancellation ==
On February 7, ABC announced that Turn-On would go on hiatus. Instead of the scheduled February 12 episode, the ABC Wednesday Night Movie (The Oscar, itself an infamous flop) would start 30 minutes early. This announcement came after the following week's TV Guide went to press; it published a listing for the scheduled February 12 episode, which would have starred Robert Culp and then-wife France Nuyen as hosts. Finally, on February 10, the show was formally canceled. By this time, WEWS, KBTV, and KATV all told ABC that they would not air the show again; with several other affiliates having already turned it down, it no longer made financial sense to air it.

ABC received 369 calls of complaint during the show and 20 calls that supported it; by comparison, the network received 1,800 protest calls several weeks earlier after preempting the Wednesday Night Movie for an address by President Richard Nixon introducing his cabinet appointees. Network officials told sponsor Bristol-Myers that the show was unacceptable and Bristol-Myers ordered Schlatter and Friendly to end production. Many assumed the show's title was itself an implicit reference to Timothy Leary's pro-drug maxim, "Turn on, tune in, drop out".

Schlatter's contract was bought out by ABC under the stipulation that Turn-On never be rerun. The network eventually replaced Turn-On with a revival of The King Family Show focusing on the Four King Cousins. The controversy led ABC to reject a pilot written by Norman Lear, stating that the lead character was "foul-mouthed, and bigoted", out of fear that it might anger its affiliates again. CBS liked the pilot, picked it up as All in the Family, and began airing it during the 1970-71 midseason. Schlatter, who returned to Laugh-In, had the writers on that show include jokes lampooning Cleveland after a directive from NBC to eliminate ethnic jokes, largely due to on WEWS' handling of Turn-On; he later said, "What is funny about Cleveland? I don't know. I've never been to Cleveland."

== Legacy ==
After Turn-On's cancellation, TV Guide called the show "the biggest bomb of the season". It stated that both CBS and NBC had rejected the show due to its perceived lack of quality, and that its sexual content was an important reason why viewers rejected the show. The magazine quoted a source who lamented Turn-On's lack of a regular host or interlocutor: "[T]here wasn't any sort of identification with the audience – just a bunch of strangers up there insulting everything you believe in." Conway said in 2008 that Turn-On was "way ahead of its time. I'm not sure even if you saw it today that maybe that time has also passed." Bart Andrews, in his 1980 book The Worst TV Shows Ever, stated that Turn-On was actually quite close to the original concept for Laugh-In. "It wasn't that it was a bad show, it was that it was an awkward show," concluded author Harlan Ellison, a fan of counter-cultural comedy and a TV critic for the Los Angeles Free Press in 1969.

In 2002, Turn-On was ranked number 27 on TV Guide's 50 Worst TV Shows of All Time. What Were They Thinking?: The 100 Dumbest Events in Television History ranked it at number 25.

Both completed episodes are available for public viewing at the Paley Center for Media. They were also made available for viewing on YouTube on October 9, 2023. On February 4, 2024, a third episode was released on YouTube, composed of unused footage from Conway's episode as well as footage from an episode guest-starring Sebastian Cabot of Family Affair.

== See also ==
- List of television series canceled after one episode
- List of television shows notable for negative reception
