= Hindsight Record Company =

Hindsight Records
- Parent company: Michelex
- Founder: Wally Heider
- Genre: Jazz
- Country of origin: U.S.
- Location: Massena, New York
- Official website: www.hindsightrecords.com

Hindsight Records is an American record label that specializes in issuing previously unreleased radio broadcast recordings of Big Bands and Jazz artists.

== History ==
Hindsight Records was founded by Big Band aficionado, recording engineer and studio owner Wally Heider, who built the label's initial catalog by obtaining Big Band radio broadcast recordings from the 1940s that had never been commercially released, along with agreements with the artists or their estates for permission to release the recordings.

In the 1970s and 1980s, Hindsight released over 100 albums, including performances by Duke Ellington, Jimmy Dorsey, Harry James, Stan Kenton, Mildred Bailey, Artie Shaw, and Woody Herman. For liner notes, Hindsight hired music historians such as Brad McCuen and Irving Townsend.

In 1979 Thomas Gramuglia of the Michelex Corporation bought the Hindsight catalog. Through Heider, Hindsight owned over 9,000 copyrights and masters.

== Jazz roster ==
- George Barnes (musician)
- Charlie Barnet
- Count Basie
- Les Brown
- Henry Busse
- Billy Butterfield
- Benny Carter
- June Christy
- Larry Clinton
- Rosemary Clooney
- Bob Crosby
- Doris Day
- Jimmy Dorsey
- Duke Ellington
- Helen Forrest
- Four Freshmen
- Jan Garber
- Benny Goodman
- Glen Gray
- Jerry Gray
- Lionel Hampton
- Woody Herman
- Tiny Hill
- Eddy Howard
- Harry James
- Dick Jurgens
- Sammy Kaye
- Stan Kenton
- The King Sisters with Frank DeVol
- Frankie Laine
- Lester Lanin
- Guy Lombardo
- Jimmie Lunceford
- Freddy Martin
- Clyde McCoy
- Carmen McRae
- Johnny Mercer
- Russ Morgan
- Buddy Morrow
- Helen O'Connell
- Will Osborne (singer)
- Alvino Rey
- Jan Savitt
- Artie Shaw
- Charlie Spivak
- Kay Starr
- Claude Thornhill
- Mel Tormé
- Bobby Troup
- Sarah Vaughan
- Bea Wain
