= Tina Cole =

American actress and singer (born 1943)

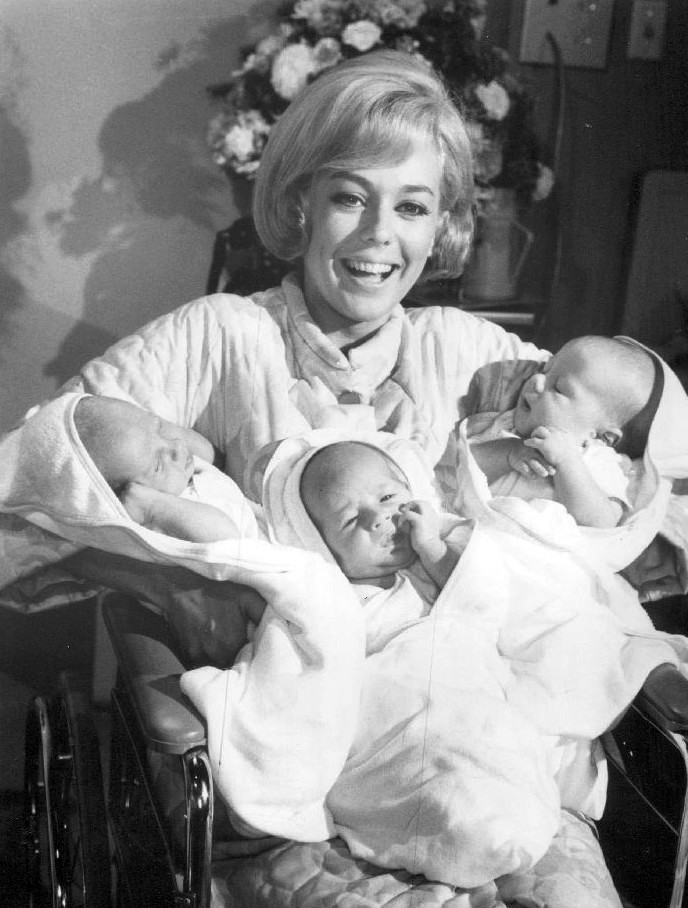
- As Katie, with triplets in My Three Sons, 1968
- Born: Christina Yvonne Cole; August 4, 1943 (age 83); Hollywood, California
- Occupations: Actress; singer; theatre director
- Years active: 1962–2020
- Spouses: Volney Howard III (m. 1965; div. 1970); Fillmore Pajeau Crank, Jr. (m. 1979, divorced)
- Children: 4
- Parents: Buddy Cole (father); Yvonne King (mother)
- Relatives: Cam Clarke (cousin)

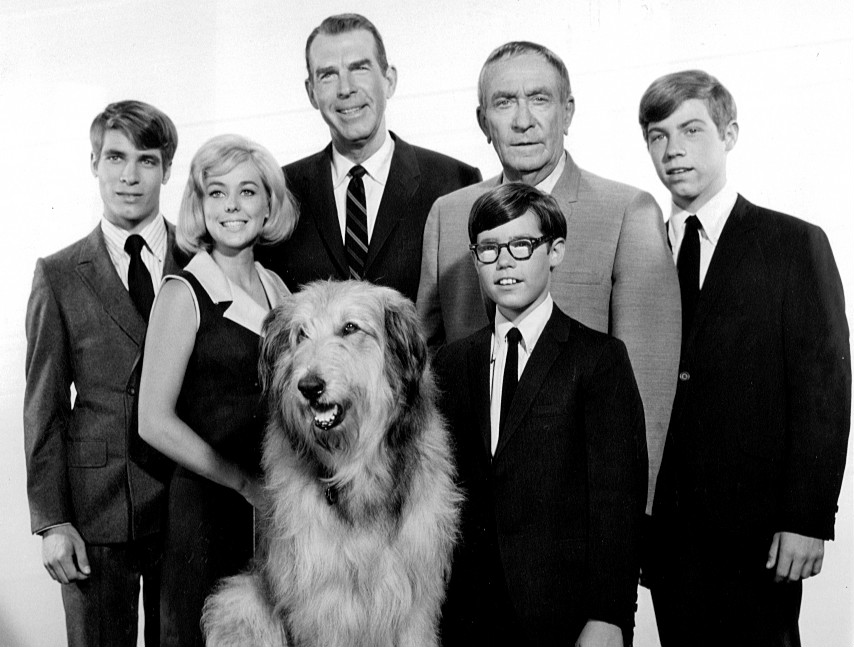
Cast of My Three Sons (1967). Back row, L-R: Don Grady, Tina Cole, Fred MacMurray, William Demerest, Stanley Livingston. Front: Tramp and Barry Livingston

Christina Yvonne Cole (born August 4, 1943) is an American actress and singer. She is best known for her role as Katie Miller Douglas on the sitcom My Three Sons (from 1967 to 1972).

== Family ==
Cole is the daughter of Yvonne King and Buddy Cole. She has a sister, Cathy Green, and four children.

== Career ==
Early in her acting career, she had a recurring role as Sunny Day in eight episodes of the detective series Hawaiian Eye (1963). In 1963, she played the minor (uncredited) role of Ruth Stewart, who throws a party and sees her home wrecked in Palm Springs Weekend, a spring break party film set in Palm Springs, California. While her more famous role on My Three Sons was her role as Katie Miller Douglas, she also appeared previously in the series in the roles of Ina ("House for Sale", 1964), Sherry ( "The Coffeehouse Set", 1964), Joanne Edwards ( "Robbie and the Little Stranger", 1966), and "Curious Person" before the Katie role was created. She had single appearances in various television series in the early 1970s, To Rome with Love, The Rookies, and Adam-12. In 1976, she appeared as a singer in Eleanor and Franklin, an ABC TV miniseries, and a singing appearance again in its sequel the next year.

Cole was also a member from 1966 of the Four King Cousins, a subgroup quartet of the King Family Singers (which ran on ABC from 1965 to 1969).

== Later life ==
After leaving television, Cole was the director of the Sacramento Children's Theatre. She was an acting coach at the John Robert Powers acting schools in Roseville and Elk Grove, California, and in 2013 returned to on-screen acting.

In late 2013, she performed with her King Cousins (sister Cathy and cousins Candy and Carolyn) and made a one-off appearance at the Catalina Jazz Club in Hollywood in November. They made subsequent appearances at the same club in April 2014 and August 2016.

She is a member of the Church of Jesus Christ of Latter-day Saints.
