= Road to Bali (album) =

Road to Bali: Selections From The Paramount Picture

Studio album by Bing Crosby, Bob Hope, Peggy Lee
- Released: 1952
- Recorded: 1952
- Genre: Popular
- Length: 16:52
- Label: Decca

Bing Crosby chronology
Selections from "Just for You" (w/ Jane Wyman and The Andrews Sisters) (1952)	Road to Bali: Selections From The Paramount Picture (1952)	Le Bing: Song Hits of Paris (1953)

Road to Bali is a Decca Records studio album by Bing Crosby, Bob Hope and Peggy Lee of songs featured in the film Road to Bali released in 1952. All of the songs were written by Jimmy Van Heusen (music) and Johnny Burke (lyrics). The songs were featured on a 10-inch vinyl LP numbered DL 5444 and in a 3-disc 45 rpm box set numbered 9-375.

Dorothy Lamour starred in the actual film with Bing and Bob but for the Decca recordings her place was taken by Peggy Lee.

== LP release ==
Recording dates follow track titles.

All lyrics are written by Johnny Burke; all music is composed by Jimmy Van Heusen.

Side one
No.	Title	Performed by	Length
1.	"The Road to Bali" (June 24, 1952)	Bing Crosby and Bob Hope with Sonny Burke and His Orchestra, and The Rhythmaires	2:31
2.	"To See You Is to Love You" (June 20, 1952)	Bing Crosby with Axel Stordahl and His Orchestra	3:11
3.	"Chicago Style" (June 23, 1952)	Bing Crosby and Bob Hope with Joe Lilley and His Orchestra	2:49

Side two
No.	Title	Performed by	Length
1.	"The Merry-go-run-around" (June 24, 1952)	Bing Crosby, Bob Hope and Peggy Lee with Sonny Burke and His Orchestra	2:31
2.	"Moonflowers" (June 20, 1952)	Peggy Lee with Axel Stordahl and His Orchestra	3:15
3.	"Hoot Mon" (June 23, 1952)	Bing Crosby and Bob Hope with Sonny Burke and His Orchestra, and The Mellomen	2:35

All of the songs were subsequently included in a 12” Decca LP numbered DL4263 issued in 1962 and subtitled “Zing a Little Zong” as part of the Bing’s Hollywood series.

== Personnel ==
The orchestra personnel for the June 23 recordings were: Red Nichols (cornet); Frank Zinzer (trumpet); Ted Vesley, Elmer Smithers (trombones); Mahlon Clark (clarinet); Dent Eckles (tenor saxophone); Harry Steinfeld (oboe); Buddy Cole (piano); Perry Botkin (guitar); Larry Breen (string bass); Nick Fatool (drums).

== Review ==
Crosby biographer Malcolm Macfarlane discussed the songs in his sleeve note for the Sepia Records CD "Bing Crosby - Through the Years - vol. 4.

TRACK 7 – To See You Is to Love You A lovely ballad from Road to Bali with a tasteful string accompaniment. It suits Bing to a tee and he delivers a fine interpretation. In the film, he sings it to Dorothy Lamour and the soundtrack recording was later used in the James Stewart-Grace Kelly movie Rear Window. Dean Martin also sang the song on radio but surprisingly I cannot trace any other recordings of it.

TRACK 8 – Hoot Mon After the romantic tones of the previous ballad, we come down-to-earth with this Scottish skit which was used to help the plot of Road to Bali along in an amusing way. Whilst it fits into the film, it is surprising that Decca decided to issue a commercial recording of it. Joe Lilley was also the musical director for the film.

TRACK 9 – Chicago Style A far better song than the last one. A lively jazz backing adds to the fun as Bing and Bob tell of Chester the Trombone King who plays his instrument in a Chicago style. The song was part of a scene in Road to Bali and the amusing antics on screen tended to make one overlook the qualities of the song. Bing sang it on four occasions on his GE show with various female partners.

TRACK 10 – The Road to Bali It has been said that this song was intended to be a part of an extended scene in the film but this was cut leaving the song to be heard over the opening credits. Again, it is surprising that Decca recorded it for commercial release. Bing and Bob did their best!

TRACK 11 – The Merry-Go-Run-Around In Road to Bali, Bing and Bob essayed this with Dorothy Lamour but Dottie was not a Decca artist so Peggy Lee was drafted in to take her place. A pleasant enough novelty song put over competently by the vocalists. At least Bing did sing it once on his radio show which is more than he did with “Hoot Mon” and “The Road to Bali”.
