= Le Bing: Song Hits of Paris =

Studio album by Bing Crosby
- Released: 1953
- Recorded: May 16, 1953
- Studio: Paris
- Genre: Vocal
- Length: 24:15
- Label: Decca

Bing Crosby chronology
Road to Bali (1952)	Le Bing: Song Hits of Paris (1953)	Some Fine Old Chestnuts (1954)

Professional ratings
Review scores
Source	Rating
Internet Museum	B link

Le Bing is the fourteenth solo studio album by American singer and actor Bing Crosby, released in 1953. It was Crosby's first studio album and was released by his longtime label, Decca Records. Le Bing is a concept album where all the songs are sung in French.

== Background ==
Crosby recorded the album in Paris on May 16, 1953, during an extended visit to Europe that spring. He had filmed parts of the movie Little Boy Lost in France the previous year. The orchestrations were by Paul Durand, a French arranger who also worked with Édith Piaf, among others.

"Embrasse-Moi Bien" and "Mademoiselle de Paris" were recorded separately in English at the May 16 session but weren't released on Le Bing. All 10 tracks were released by Sepia Records on the 2010 CD Through the Years: Volume Five (1953). In 2013, the entire album (including the two previously mentioned tracks sung in English) was re-issued on CD by Bing Crosby Enterprises and distributed by Universal Music as a 60th Anniversary Deluxe Edition. This contained many additional radio tracks with a French theme.

In 1958, after Crosby had left Decca, the label issued a compilation album titled Bing in Paris, subtitled "Bing Crosby Sings the French Hits." Unlike Le Bing, some songs on Bing in Paris are sung in English.

== Critical reception ==
Billboard magazine called it "very nice," saying: "This set could move very well."

Record producer, Ken Barnes, wrote: "According to the discographical information, this remarkable album was recorded in a single day. The orchestrations and conducting are uncredited (although it sounds like John Scott Trotter's work). Unfortunately, the string sound is a little thin and the intonation of the violins is somewhat insecure on one or two tracks - notably on 'Embrasse-moi bien'. But the same can never be said of Mr Crosby whose pitching is unerringly accurate throughout all eight titles. Of his French accent, Bing remarked at the time that any complaints should be sent 'to the back door of the United Nations'."

== Track listing ==
All recordings made with Paul Durand Et Son Grand Orchestre.

Side one
No.	Title	Writer(s)	Length
1.	"Mademoiselle de Paris" ("Mademoiselle from Paris")	Paul Durand, Henri Contet	3:11
2.	"Embrasse-moi bien" ("Kiss Me Right")	André Grassi	3:35
3.	"Mon Cœur est un Violon" ("My Heart is a Violin")	Maria Laparcerie	2:58
4.	"La Vie en rose" ("Life in Pink")	Louiguy, Édith Piaf	2:54

Side two
No.	Title	Writer(s)	Length
1.	"La Seine" ("The Seine")	Guy Lafarge, Flavien Monod	2:38
2.	"Au bord de l'eau" ("At the Water's Edge")	Paul Durand, Henri Contet	2:22
3.	"La Mer" ("The Sea")	Charles Trenet	3:37
4.	"Tu ne peux pas te figurer" ("You Cannot Imagine")	Paul Misraki	3:00

== Personnel ==
- Bing Crosby – vocals
- Paul Durand – arranger, conductor
