= Lego DC Batman: Family Matters =

- Directed by: Matt Peters
- Written by: Jeremy Adams
- Based on: Batman by Bob Kane and Bill Finger
- Produced by: Rick Morales; Jim Krieg (co-producer); Michael Uslan; Sam Register; Jason Cosler & Jill Wilfert (executive producer)
- Starring: Troy Baker; Will Friedle; Jason Spisak; Alyson Stoner
- Music by: Tim Kelly
- Production companies: The Lego Group; DC Entertainment; Warner Bros. Animation
- Distributed by: Warner Bros. Home Entertainment
- Release dates: July 21, 2019 (San Diego Comic-Con); August 20, 2019 (Digital, DVD and Blu-ray)
- Running time: 72 minutes
- Country: United States
- Language: English

Lego DC Batman: Family Matters is a 2018 American animated superhero comedy film. It is a superhero action-adventure comedy based on the DC Comics and Lego brands produced by DC Entertainment, The Lego Group and Warner Bros. Animation, and distributed by Warner Bros. Home Entertainment, it premiered at San Diego Comic-Con on July 21, 2019 and was released on DVD, Blu-ray and Digital on August 20, 2019. It is the ninth Lego DC Comics film. The DVD release includes a free 84-piece LEGO set. The film received positive reviews, with praise for the humor and action, although the consumerism was criticized.

This is the first Batman project on which Michael E. Uslan is credited as an executive producer without his longtime partner Benjamin Melniker, who died almost a year and a half before its release.

== Plot ==
Official trailer

After foiling Solomon Grundy, Batman heads off to his company Wayne Enterprises in his civilian identity where his employees discuss a new AI system named Brother Eye. While Bruce likes the idea of the system's OMAC drones doing work for others, he later dismisses the system as he goes home.

Believing that time in his civilian identity cuts out time as a vigilante, Batman decides to sell Wayne Enterprises. Two-Face discovers this and teams up with Red Hood to get revenge on Batman for overshadowing him and to increase his reputation.

Batman, Nightwing, Batgirl and Batwoman each receive a message to meet at a particular alleyway. Batman agrees to this with Robin eventually joining in with the rest of the Bat Family, despite Batman's demands.

After defeating Red Hood's robot minions, Red Hood reveals that he knows the Bat-Family's secret identities and has placed bombs across Gotham, one of which will only be revealed if the rest are disarmed. The Bat Family split up to disarm the bombs, with Nightwing taking Robin with him and telling Batman to be less overprotective.

Batwoman disarms a bomb at the GCPD while facing Killer Croc, Batgirl finds a bomb at the Fairgrounds guarded by Scarecrow, and Nightwing and Robin battle Penguin and Riddler in a railway yard. They successfully defeat their respective opponents, but are apprehended by Red Hood.

Batman arrives at the Monarch theater and meets Billy Batson, an orphan who wants to have Bruce solve the financial problems of his orphanage. At that moment, Two-Face shows up and reveals the fourth bomb. As Batman fights Two-Face, Billy disarms the bomb with help from a mysterious voice. Two-Face is defeated but manages to escape. Red Hood then tells Batman to return to the Batcave.

At the Batcave, Batman deduces that Red Hood is his former protégé Jason Todd, who left after believing that Batman did not care for him. Batman apologizes and then reveals that after Jason left, he attempted to find him but ultimately lost track. Accepting Batman's apology, Red Hood releases the Bat Family and reveals that the bombs are harmless. However, Two-Face informs via video that he bought Wayne Enterprises and proceeds to cause havoc and unleash the OMAC drones in Gotham. He then demands to see Batman to exact revenge, threatening to use Brother Eye to destroy the city if they do not show up. Batman leaves to face Two-Face while the rest of the Bat-Family fight the OMAC drones.

At Wayne Industries, Batman struggles to keep his identity secret until Red Hood arrives disguised as him. As Red Hood is locked inside the OMAC factory and fights Brother Eye, Batman (in his civilian identity) fights and defeats Two-Face, apologizing for overshadowing him.

The Bat Family is initially overwhelmed by the OMAC drones until Robin gains the idea to combine their vehicles, allowing them to gain an advantage. Red Hood outwits Brother Eye and tricks him into cutting off his power supply, after which he falls out of orbit.

Having dealt with Two-Face, Batman joins Red Hood and the two reconcile until Brother Eye attempts to destroy Wayne Enterprises' power core. When Brother Eye denies Batman's request to stop, Batman apologizes and admits that he failed to see the good Wayne Enterprises was doing to Gotham. Batman states that he should be more open to other people rather than pushing them away, realizing that doing so caused Jason to go rogue. Moved by Batman's words, Brother Eye shuts down and halts his attempt to blow up the power core.

Following this, Batman decides to be more considerate towards his protégés, and Red Hood moves back into the Batcave. In a mid-credit scene, Billy enters a subway station and finds a bizarre-looking train. The voice who helped him earlier tells him to board the train for the journey of a lifetime, to which he agrees.

== Cast ==
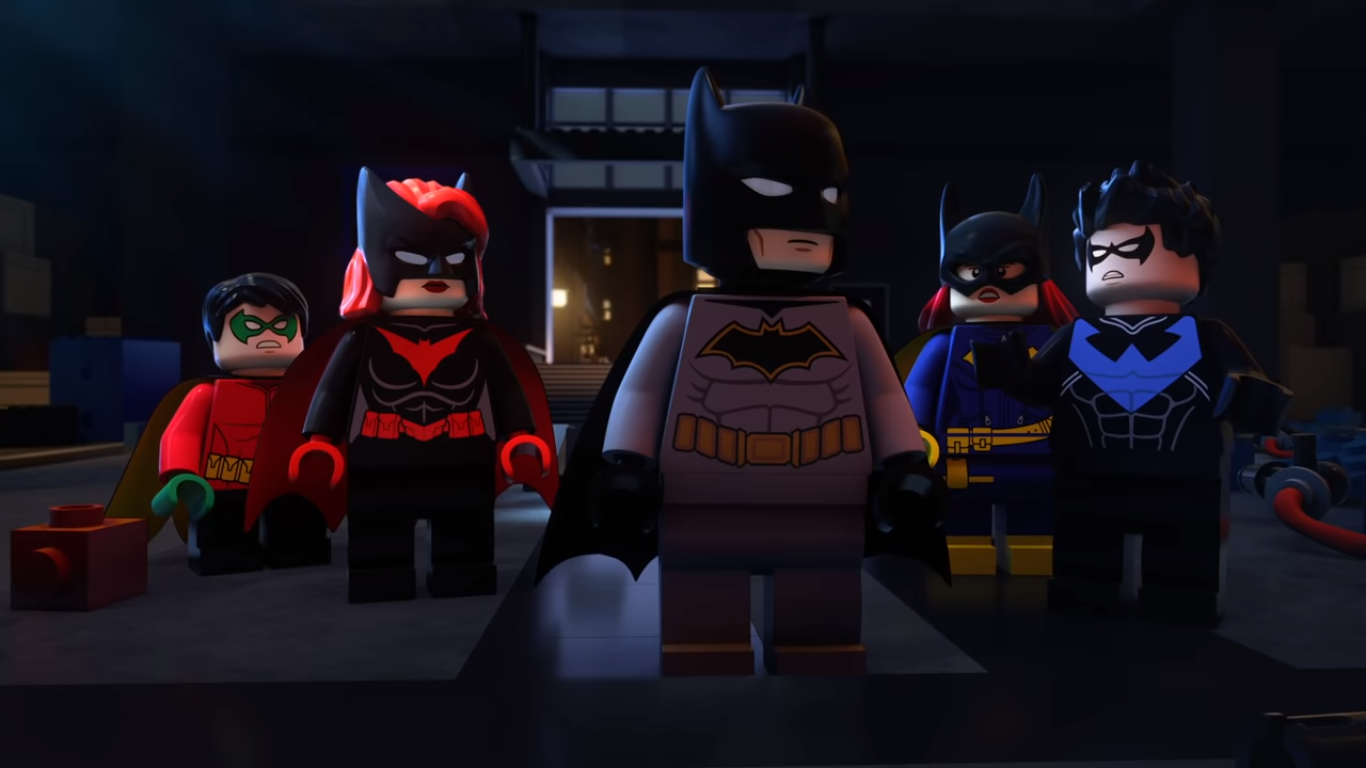
Various characters from the film (left-right): Damian Wayne/Robin, Kate Kane/Batwoman, Bruce Wayne/Batman, Barbara Gordon/Batgirl, and Dick Grayson/Nightwing

- Troy Baker as Bruce Wayne / Batman
- Alyson Stoner as Barbara Gordon / Batgirl
- Scott Menville as Damian Wayne / Robin
- Jason Spisak as Jason Todd / Red Hood
- Steve Blum as Scarecrow
- Zach Callison as Billy Batson / Shazam
- Cam Clarke as Brother Eye, Bat Computer
- Will Friedle as Dick Grayson / Nightwing
- Ralph Garman as Wizard
- Jake Green as Fred
- Josh Keaton as Board Member
- Tom Kenny as Commissioner Gordon, Penguin
- Christian Lanz as Harvey Dent / Two-Face
- Nolan North as Alfred, Killer Croc
- André Sogliuzzo as Riddler
- Tara Strong as Kate Kane / Batwoman
- Fred Tatasciore as Solomon Grundy

== Reception ==
Lego DC Batman: Family Matters earned $373,527 from domestic DVD sales and $257,140 from domestic Blu-ray sales, bringing its total domestic home video earnings to $630,667.

Renee Longstreet for Common Sense Media gave the film a three out of five star rating and commented, "This entry in the Lego DC partnership has a nice balance of fun, emotional tugs, and comic action; the villains, robot armies, rockets, and explosions come fast and often, and so do the twists. The story, though heavily populated, is easy to follow and sticks to the basic DC formula: old villains rise up, bring on the battles, get defeated, and the superheroes celebrate. Batman's role as a parent is part of the tale, as he has dealings with all three young people that he's mentored, one in a surprise appearance. The two female 'members of the family,' Batgirl (Alyson Stoner) and Batwoman (Tara Strong), have lots to do, and keep up with the male members of the team. Lego DC Comics Batman: Family Matters is entertaining for kids as long as they understand cartoon action is different from real danger."
