= Four King Cousins =

American female pop singing group

The Four King Cousins
- Also known as: The Five King Cousins
- Origin: Hollywood
- Genres: Pop
- Years active: 1966–1979, 2009–present
- Label: Capitol Records
- Members: Tina Cole; Cathy Cole Green; Candy Conkling Brand; Carolyn Cameron
- Past members: Jamie Conkling
- Website: fourkingcousins.com

The Four King Cousins are an American female harmonizing pop singing group.

Born into a show business family, the members are daughters of the singing group The King Sisters. Sisters Tina Cole & Cathy Cole Green are the daughters of King Sister Yvonne King, and musician Buddy Cole; Candy Conkling Brand is the daughter of King Sister Donna King and music executive Jim Conkling, Carolyn Cameron is the daughter of original King Sister Maxine Thomas and King Family performer LaVarn Thomas. Tina, Cathy, Candy, and Carolyn are all cousins.

The members of the Four King Cousins made their individual professional television debuts, along with their mothers, as part of the extended family of musical performers known as the King Family. The King Family starred in two network musical variety television series titled The King Family Show, in addition to seventeen syndicated television specials which aired for over a decade.

== Beginnings ==
Following the successful run of The King Family’s initial ABC television series, sisters Tina & Cathy Cole, along with their cousins Carolyn Thomas, and Candy & Jamie Conkling, joined the cast of NBC’s Kraft Summer Music Hall during the summer of 1966. The group, then billed as The Five King Cousins, were featured in the show’s youthful ensemble of performers which included host John Davidson, and comedians Richard Pryor, Flip Wilson and George Carlin. The series led to a nationwide concert tour with John Davidson and George Carlin. Before the tour began, Jamie Conkling left to pursue her education at Brigham Young University, and thus the group officially became The Four King Cousins.

== Television appearances ==
The Four King Cousins appeared on musical variety and talk shows of the day including The Hollywood Palace, Operation: Entertainment (where they entertained the troops at military bases around the country), The Don Knotts Show, Della (the Della Reese Show), The Barbara McNair Show, The Pat Boone Show, The Donald O'Connor Show, The Merv Griffin Show, It's Happening, The Joey Bishop Show, The Mike Douglas Show and as semi-regular guest-star performers on The Jonathan Winters Show. The Four King Cousins also made a series of appearances on The Tonight Show with Johnny Carson where they joined the Mighty Carson Art Players in comedy sketches.

Concurrently they were appearing on the King Family's syndicated series of television specials including "Thanksgiving with the King Family", "Christmas with the King Family", "Valentines Day with the King Family", "Mother's Day with the King Family", "Backstage with the King Family", "Holiday Cruise with the King Family", "The King Family in Washington DC" and others. The group also headlined the King Family’s second ABC television variety series, becoming star performers on The King Family Show during the 1969 season.

Throughout the 1970s the group continued to appear on television. They joined the King Sisters and Diahann Carroll as guest stars on ABC’s "Christmas in New York", sang with Dionne Warwick on ABC TV’s bicentennial show "The Great American Music Celebration", appeared on The Merv Griffin Show, and later joined a list of star performers including Dick Clark, Fred MacMurray, Ron Howard, Barry Manilow and The Lennon Sisters on ABC’s "Silver Anniversary Celebration."

Concurrent with her performances with The Four King Cousins, Tina Cole also established herself as an actress on television series including Hawaiian Eye and Adam-12 and in particular starring as Katie Douglas (wife of Don Grady’s Robbie) for five seasons on the popular, long-running series My Three Sons.

== Debut album ==
Signed to Capitol Records, the Four King Cousins released their debut album titled Introducing the Four King Cousins which was produced, arranged and conducted by their cousin, Golden Globe nominee Lex de Azevedo, in 1968. The album displayed the group’s four-part vocal style in covers of hits of the era.

The album was re-released on CD in the United Kingdom in 2006. Indie record store Dusty Groove has reviewed this album as "a sublime blend of vocals and lightly snapping rhythms that's totally outta site!" while Richie Unterberger described their harmonies as "sunny [and] bland".

== Concert appearances ==
Following their 1969 Las Vegas debut with Wayne Newton at the Frontier Hotel, the Four King Cousins presented their concert act at top nightclubs, performing arts centers and concert halls throughout the world for the next decade.

Their schedule of concert appearances included engagements at the Hollywood Bowl, the Fairmont Hotels in Dallas, and New Orleans, multiple appearances at the Playboy Resort in Lake Geneva, annual appearances at Walt Disney World’s Top of the World supper club, and Disneyland’s Tomorrowland Stage, as well as international appearances in Canada, Tahiti, France, and throughout Japan.

In reviewing their show, the Columbus (Ohio) Citizen-Journal heralded their performance as "hugely entertaining... a dynamite musical variety act" and noted that "The Cousins virtually explode with excitement... an express train of entertainment", while the Orlando Sentinel called their act "powerful" and avowed that "the King Cousins, four of the liveliest, loveliest and most entertaining young women to hit the area, harmonize beautifully."

== Later history ==
The Four King Cousins recorded a second album which was released by the Playboy/Trio Records label in 1976 only for the Japanese market. Titled The Way We Were, it featured a mix of pop hits of the era including, Leon Russell’s "A Song For You", Neil Sedaka’s "Solitaire", and Marvin Hamlisch’s title track, alongside standards including "In the Mood" and "Bei Mir Bist Du Schön".

At the end of the 1970s the group ceased substantive operations in order for the members to raise their own families.

In 2009, group members Tina, Cathy, and Candy appeared on the PBS television retrospective special "Christmas with the King Family", a musical celebration of the King Family’s classic holiday television specials. To coincide with the special, four King Family albums were released on CD. The Four King Cousins jazz-vocal rendition of the Al Burt Christmas carol "Some Children See Him" was featured on the CD release Christmas with the King Family They also contributed personal selections from their own family’s recipes to The King Family Cookbook, also released that year.

In 2013, the Four King Cousins released a third album, More Today Than Yesterday: Classic Songs of the 60s & 70s. The tracks were recorded between 1968 and 1976 for the King Family television series and TV specials such as "Mother's Day with The King Family" and "The King Family in San Francisco".

In 2013, the group performed their first live concert in three decades at the Catalina Jazz Club in Los Angeles.

The Four King Cousins concert dates in 2015 included the Lobrero Theater in Santa Barbara and a college concert in Salt Lake City. They were scheduled to return to Catalina Jazz Club in Los Angeles in August 2016.

== Discography ==
- Introducing the Four King Cousins (LP 1968, Capitol #LPCAPI2990; CD 2006, él)
- The Way We Were (LP 1976, Playboy/Trio Records)
- More Today Than Yesterday: Classic Songs of the 60s & 70s (CD 2013, Polly O. Entertainment)
