= The Lord of the Rings (soundtrack) =

J.R.R. Tolkien's The Lord of the Rings

Soundtrack album by Leonard Rosenman
- Released: 1978
- Recorded: 1977
- Genre: Soundtrack
- Length: 70:36
- Label: Fantasy Records
- Producers: Saul Zaentz; Leonard Rosenman

Ralph Bakshi film soundtrack chronology
Heavy Traffic OST (1973)	J.R.R. Tolkien's; The Lord of the Rings (1978)	American Pop OST (1981)

Professional ratings
Review scores
Source	Rating
Allmusic	2.5/5 stars

J.R.R. Tolkien's The Lord of the Rings is the soundtrack to Ralph Bakshi's animated film adaptation of J.R.R. Tolkien's The Lord of the Rings, featuring music composed by Leonard Rosenman. It was issued as a double-LP in 1978. In 2001, the album was reissued on CD, with bonus tracks. The album reached No. 33 in the Canadian RPM Magazine albums chart, February 24, 1979.

== Track listing ==
=== Original vinyl edition ===
Side 1:

1. Theme from "Lord of the Rings" (02:53)
2. History of the Ring (06:32)
3. The Journey begins / Encounter with the Ringwraiths (04:33)
4. Riders of Rohan (03:45)

Side 2:

1. Escape to Rivendell (06:22)
2. Mines of Moria (06:11)
3. The Battle in the Mines / The Balrog (05:11)

Side 3:

1. Mithrandir (03:20)
2. Gandalf remembers (02:22)
3. Frodo disappears (02:38)
4. Following the Orcs (03:16)
5. Attack of the Orcs (04:04)

Side 4:

1. Helm's Deep (07:02)
2. The Dawn Battle / Theoden's Victory (04:59)
3. The Voyage to Mordor / Theme from the "Lord of the Rings" (04:45)

=== CD reissue ===
1. History Of The Ring
2. Gandalf Throws Ring
3. The Journey Begins; Encounter With The Ringwraiths
4. Trying To Kill Hobbits
5. Escape To Rivendell
6. Company Of The Ring
7. Mines Of Moria
8. The Battle In The Mines; The Balrog
9. Mithrandir
10. Frodo Disappears
11. Following The Orcs
12. Fleeing Orcs
13. Attack Of The Orcs
14. Gandalf Remembers
15. Riders Of Rohan
16. Helm's Deep
17. The Dawn Battle; Theoden's Victory
18. The Voyage To Mordor; Theme From The Lord Of The Rings
