= OMAC (comics) =

Fictional type of cyborg in DC Comics

OMACs
- The Michael Costner version of OMAC as seen on the cover of OMAC #1 (September 2006). Art by Renato Guedes.

Publication information
- Publisher: DC Comics
- First appearance: The OMAC Project #1 (June 2005)
- Created by: Greg Rucka; Jesús Saíz

In-story information
- Species: Cyborgs
- Team affiliations: Justice League International; Justice League
- Notable aliases: One Man Army Corps
- Abilities: Cybernetic armor; Access to extensive metahuman database; Power opposition; Engineering mimicry

The OMACs (/ˈoʊmæks/; Omni Mind And Community, originally Observational Metahuman Activity Construct and alternatively One Man Army Corps.) are a fictional type of cyborg appearing in American comic books published by DC Comics. They are based on the character of the same name created by Jack Kirby.

The OMAC reimagined as collapsible powered armor with brain–computer interfaces appeared in the 2023 live-action film Blue Beetle, set in the DC Extended Universe.

== Publication history ==
The OMACs first appeared in The OMAC Project #1 (June 2005) and were created by writer Greg Rucka and artist Jesús Saíz.

== Fictional team biography ==
=== The OMAC Project ===
The OMACs are cyborgs, human bodies transformed by a virus into living machines to assassinate any and all beings with superpowers. The virus was created from Brainiac 13's nanotechnology, which had been acquired by the U.S. Department of Defense and Lexcorp, and was then secretly introduced into general vaccine supplies. The OMACs are featured in the mini-series The OMAC Project, one of several preludes to the series Infinite Crisis.

==== Brother MK I ====
The new OMACs are controlled by Brother MK I, a satellite that was created by Batman, programmed by Buddy Blank, and designed to gather data on metahumans. Batman had grown distrustful of metahumans after remembering that the Justice League altered his memories following an altercation with Doctor Light in Identity Crisis. Alexander Luthor Jr. later gives the satellite sentience as part of his plans. Maxwell Lord, promoted to the top rank of Checkmate, subverts the original mission of the Brother MK I satellite by inculcating a fear and suspicion of all metahumans.

==== Brother Eye ====
The Brother Eye.

When Maxwell Lord brainwashes Superman to kill Batman, Wonder Woman kills Lord to free Superman from his control. Brother MK I, rechristening itself Brother Eye, initiates the "KingIsDead" protocol, which was specifically designed to be used in the event of Lord's death. It orders all of the OMACs (numbering more than one million) to attack and kill every metahuman on Earth and destroy Checkmate. A group superhero effort stops the attack, freeing most of the OMAC hosts from their nanotech forms and reducing the number of remaining OMACs to roughly 200,000.

=== Infinite Crisis ===
==== Truth and Justice ====
The satellite broadcast footage of Wonder Woman executing Maxwell Lord, preceded by the word MURDER, is spread to media outlets all over the world, destroying her reputation. After this, Brother Eye initiates the final protocol, "Truth and Justice", by having all the remaining OMACs invade and attack Wonder Woman's homeland, Themyscira, to wipe out all of the Amazons.

It is revealed that Alexander Luthor Jr. wrested control of Brother Eye away from Batman. He used it to program his multiverse tuning fork and redirect its energy to where he needed it as part of his attempt to re-create Earth-Two, and in turn, a perfect Earth. Brother Eye aids Luthor by remapping out the multiverse and helping to guard the tuning fork with its OMACs, reasoning that it would eliminate the need for heroes like those who Batman had created it to monitor by aiding in the creation of a perfect Earth.

==== Downfall of Brother Eye ====
Agents of Checkmate battle the Brother Eye satellite, cover to The OMAC Project: Infinite Crisis Special (2006), art by Jose Ladrönn.

Batman leads Hal Jordan, John Stewart, Green Arrow, Mister Terrific, Black Lightning, Black Canary, Blue Beetle, Metamorpho, Booster Gold, and Sasha Bordeaux to Earth's orbit using intel from Booster Gold and Ted Kord's spaceship. Blue Beetle's scarab allows him to find and reveal Brother Eye by negating its vibrational frequency. Brother Eye sends the OMACs and the two groups clash.

With the two Green Lanterns fighting off most of the OMACs and Brother Eye's defenses, the heroes' ship crashes into Brother Eye. Sasha links to Oracle to upload viruses into Brother Eye's system, while the other heroes target Brother Eye's crucial components and/or fight off its remaining OMACs and defenses until Mr. Terrific, invisible to machines and electronics, delivers the fatal blow by knocking Brother Eye out of orbit using its orbital thrusters.

After crash-landing in Saudi Arabia, Brother Eye tries to download its system into Sasha as a means of self-preservation, but Sasha manages to destroy the satellite, freeing herself from the nanobots infecting her.

=== Michael Costner ===
Brother Eye was not fully destroyed and lies in a NORAD facility. Michael Costner is the last OMAC unit, kept as emergency backup, and Brother Eye calls to him.

This Brother Eye has corrupted programming and now believes all humans need to be subjugated or exterminated whether metahuman or not. The 2006 limited series OMAC follows Michael Costner as Brother Eye attempts to make him rebuild it. Costner regains control of his body and destroys Brother Eye again, although a small part of it is still active.

=== Countdown to Final Crisis ===
A portion of Brother Eye is retrieved and rebuilt by Buddy Blank. This portion meets with the time-traveling Karate Kid who is seeking a cure for Morticoccus, a 31st-century illness that evolved from the OMAC virus. Announcing that "the Great Disaster has come to me", Brother Eye directs him to Blüdhaven. Soon after, it reactivates its offensive protocols and assimilates the hangar it is being held in, turning the people within the hangar into new OMAC cyborgs. It then travels to the ruins of Blüdhaven and assimilates the city's infrastructure and the people within it using the Atomic Knights and Firestorm as power sources. Later, it activates a Boom Tube and travels to Apokolips, where it assimilates the planet and attempts to obtain the Morticoccus virus from Karate Kid. Brother Eye is forced to flee Apokolips after the Pied Piper attacks it.

Brother Eye later transforms Buddy Blank into a modified OMAC resembling Kirby's version of the character. Blank uses this power to save himself and his grandson from starvation in the Command-D bunker beneath Blüdhaven. Brother Eye implies that it will contact Blank again for a future need.

=== Batman and the Outsiders ===
Salah Miandad / ReMAC from Batman and the Outsiders. Art by Julian Lopez.

A modified OMAC is shown as a part of the new Outsiders team in the 2008 Batman and the Outsiders series.

When a team from the Justice League attempts to seize a partially active OMAC, a leftover from The OMAC Project events, Batman takes the opportunity to reclaim it for himself—having Francine Langstrom create a clever forgery to leave in care of the League.

The OMAC, renamed ReMAC, is a husk devoid of any personal identity, with Langstrom being unable to uncover who it was before being turned into an OMAC. This complete lack of personality makes ReMAC the perfect infiltrator, using its advanced shapeshifting abilities and unquestioning obedience for the Outsiders' cause. Batman creates a telepresence system turning ReMAC into an advanced drone for Langstrom's assistant Salah Miandad, enabling operation from the Outsiders HQ, the Batcave, or other secret locations.

While testing a new neural interface to control the former OMAC, Miandad is knocked into a coma. His mind comes to reside in ReMAC, supplanting the missing personality of the drone. Due to the machinations of Simon Hurt, ReMAC is fed a malicious self-destruct code that destroys it, killing Miandad.

=== Final Crisis ===
In Final Crisis, Darkseid and his prophets take new forms as humans on Earth after mass-distributing the Anti-Life Equation around the world. Mister Terrific and Checkmate work to mount a resistance against Darkseid, but seemingly do not have the means to do it. Sitting in despair in a Checkmate stronghold, Snapper Carr gives Mister Terrific an idea. Using Sasha Bordeaux to make contact with Brother Eye, he convinces the A.I. to help them, explaining that it will be destroyed if Darkseid captures the world.

Realizing this, Brother Eye accepts Mister Terrific's terms and reveals that there are still millions of people infected with OMAC technology. These people, now mindless drones of Darkseid, are overwritten by Brother Eye and become OMAC soldiers under the command of Mister Terrific. This gives Checkmate and him the means to resist Darkseid. Brother Eye prepares to leave the doomed Earth with his OMACs and start a new society in another universe.

=== Generation Lost ===
In Justice League: Generation Lost, the resurrected Maxwell Lord controls the squad of OMACs attacking Jaime Reyes's home and his family. After Lord escapes from the JLI, Booster Gold's robot Skeets informs the JLI that he has the locations of the four formerly-dormant Checkmate cells which he had placed inside robotics laboratories that Lord has been in contact with. The JLI travel to Chicago beneath the hidden robotics laboratory and learns that the OMAC variants were pure robots that are human/machine synthesis of the originals.

Lord sends his newest OMAC, known as OMAC Prime, to which he had given both sentience and his voice, to attack Diana and the JLI. This new OMAC could assimilate the abilities of metahumans, initially overwhelming the heroes it fought. During the final battle, Prime takes Blue Beetle's power, causing it to become nearly unstoppable, but Blue Beetle mentions to OMAC Prime that it cannot control the Scarab's power. Blue Beetle uses this to paralyze Prime with crippling system failures before attacking and destroying it.

=== Kevin Kho ===
In 2011, The New 52 rebooted the DC universe. A Cambodian-American man named Kevin Kho is introduced as the new O.M.A.C. (One-Machine Attack Construct) and had worked as a genetic researcher at Project Cadmus. Maxwell Lord is revealed to have had a hand in Kho's transformation in addition to using New Genesis technology. O.M.A.C. starred in a self-titled series that was cancelled after eight issues due to DC's introduction of a "Second Wave" of new titles.

During the "Forever Evil" storyline, the Crime Syndicate of America captures Kevin Kho, intending to use him as a weapon. Harley Quinn, who is working for the Thinker, takes O.M.A.C. and leaves him near James Gordon Jr. While Gordon is talking to Harley, the Thinker takes O.M.A.C. and begins transferring his mind into it. Now activated, O.M.A.C. attacks Amanda Waller, Gordon, Harley Quinn, King Shark, and Kamo. King Shark attacks Kamo until Waller convinces them both to help her stop OMAC.

Kevin Kho is reintroduced following the "DC Rebirth" relaunch, which restored the continuity of the DC Comics universe to a state closer to the pre-New 52 continuity.

== Powers and abilities ==
Brother Eye can activate the virus in any infected person, at any time, within planetary range. Once activated, the person is covered in cybernetic armor and becomes a thrall to Brother Eye's commands.

An OMAC unit has access to archives on almost every metahuman on file, and can simulate countermeasures to the powers of a variety of superheroes and supervillains for the purpose of targeting the weaknesses of an opponent. Among the many inbuilt powers an OMAC drone possesses include flight, enhanced physical abilities, and projecting energy beams from its face and hands. In addition, the OMAC unit can transform into various shapes and sizes, i.e. being able to change and alter its limbs into blades and cannons, as well as to interface with technology.

Their main function is the application of nanotechnology to simulate the weaknesses of an opposing superpowered being whilst detaining and dispatching them. Such as shooting fire, project needles of artificial cellulose (against Alan Scott; an approximation of his weakness to wood), dispense flame-retarding foam, even once simulating Shazam's lightning power forcing Mary Marvel to revert to her human form.

Maxwell Lord designed a powerful and extremely deadly new class of O.M.A.C called O.M.A.C. Prime using the Metal Men's responsometer technology, Amazo's absorption cells, and a Reach Scarab. O.M.A.C. Prime is able to replicate and combine superpowers, steadily making it stronger.

== In other media ==
=== Television ===
- The Buddy Blank incarnation of OMAC and Brother Eye appear in Batman: The Brave and the Bold, voiced by Jeff Bennett and Dee Bradley Baker respectively.
- The OMAC concept and Brother Eye are alluded to in Arrow. In the episode "Corto Maltese", Ray Palmer inspects blueprints for an OMAC exo-suit, though by "The Climb", he changes the name to "A.T.O.M." In the episode "The Secret Origin of Felicity Smoak", a group of cyber-terrorists referring to themselves as Brother Eye use a virus to attack Starling City and threaten to shut down all banks and set everyone on an even socioeconomic status. The eponymous Felicity Smoak is later revealed to have created the Brother Eye virus years ago, with her ex-boyfriend Cooper Seldon currently holding the name and leading the terrorist group.
- The OMACs appear in My Adventures with Superman as robotic foot soldiers for Task Force X.

=== Film ===
- The OMACs and Brother Eye would have appeared in the abandoned project Justice League: Mortal as underlings of Maxwell Lord and Talia al Ghul.
- The OMACs and Brother Eye appear in Lego DC Batman: Family Matters, with the latter voiced by Cam Clarke.
- OMAC was intended to appear in a cancelled sequel to The Lego Batman Movie.
- The OMAC Project appears in Blue Beetle as a series of collapsible powered armors with brain–computer interface developed by Kord Industries, with a prototype utilized by Ignacio Carapax (portrayed by Raoul Trujillo).

=== Video games ===
- The OMAC Project makes a cameo appearance in Batman's ending for Mortal Kombat vs. DC Universe. This version stands for Outerworld Monitor and Auto Containment and was created to defend Earth from multiversal invaders.
- Brother Eye and the OMAC Project appear in DC Universe Online, with the former voiced by Ken Thomas.
- OMAC and Brother Eye appear as character summons in Scribblenauts Unmasked: A DC Comics Adventure.
- Brother Eye appears in Injustice 2, voiced by David Loefell. This version is a communications hub linking every satellite and server on Earth that was created by Batman to warn of impending crime after the toppling of Superman's Regime and is based in a new Batcave built in an old Gotham City subway system. In the game's "Multiverse Mode", Brother Eye is stated to have Source energy scanners, enabling it to search for threats across the multiverse.
- OMAC appears as a playable character in Lego DC Super-Villains.
