= Some Fine Old Chestnuts =

Studio album by Bing Crosby
- Released: 1954
- Recorded: June 26, 1953
- Genre: Vocal
- Label: Decca
- Producer: Buddy Cole

Bing Crosby chronology
| Le Bing: Song Hits of Paris (1953) | Some Fine Old Chestnuts (1954) | Bing Sings the Hits (1954) |

Some Fine Old Chestnuts is the fifteenth solo studio album by American singer and actor Bing Crosby. It was Crosby’s second studio album for Decca Records, recorded and released as a 10" LP in 1954.

The 1954 edition of Some Fine Old Chestnuts featured eight standards mastered on June 26, 1953, from tracks recorded for Crosby's weekly CBS radio show with a trio led by Crosby's regular pianist Buddy Cole. Crosby's 1957 Decca LP New Tricks also features songs recorded for radio accompanied by Cole.

Decca later expanded Some Fine Old Chestnuts into a 12" LP by adding four more tracks that were recorded in 1954 and 1955: "In a Little Spanish Town," "Honeysuckle Rose," "Ol' Man River" and "Swanee".

The 8-track was issued on CD in 1993 by MCA Records in Japan. In 1998 it was included in a double CD called Some Fine Old Chestnuts & New Tricks issued by MCA. All eight of the original tracks from Some Fine Old Chestnuts were released by Sepia Records on the 2010 CD Through the Years: Volume Five (1953). In 2014, Bing Crosby Enterprises and Universal Music issued a deluxe, 23-track version of the album to mark its 60th anniversary.

== Reception ==
Record producer Ken Barnes wrote, "Bing is in excellent voice — thanks to an intelligent choice of keys — and accompanied only by the Buddy Cole Trio (piano, bass and drums). The recording quality is truly superb. The only criticism is an alarming sameness in the presentation of each song (first chorus slow, second chorus fast — or, at least, moderately bright). But perhaps this is being churlish when the standard of performance is so high. Apart from Bing's glorious vocals (his performance of 'Sleepy Time Gal' is absolutely definitive), there is Buddy Cole's dazzling piano work."

William Ruhlmann of AllMusic wrote, "The circumstances surrounding the appearance of the LP reflect the reduced significance of recording to the singer; as he aged into his fifties, he cut back somewhat on his professional activities, notably recording ... Nevertheless, the actual performances are comfortable and confident, as the singer takes a slightly jazzy approach to the familiar material."

== Track listing ==
1. "Do You Ever Think of Me" (Earl Burtnett/John Cooper/Harry D. Kerr) – 2:42
2. "I Never Knew (That Roses Grew)" (Ted Fio Rito/Gus Kahn) – 2:37
3. "Somebody Loves Me" (Buddy DeSylva/George Gershwin/Ballard MacDonald) – 2:02
4. "After You've Gone" (Henry Creamer/Turner Layton) – 2:03
5. "Sleepy Time Gal" (Joseph Reed Alden/Raymond B. Egan/Ange Lorenzo/Richard A. Whiting) 2:31
6. "Dinah" (Harry Akst/Sam M. Lewis/Joe Young) – 2:20
7. "I Never Knew (I Could Love Anybody)" (Raymond B. Egan/Roy Marsh/Thomas Pitts) – 1:45
8. "I Can't Give You Anything but Love, Baby" (Dorothy Fields/Jimmy McHugh) – 2:29

== Personnel ==
- Bing Crosby – vocals
- Buddy Cole – piano, arranger, conductor
- Perry Botkin Sr. – guitar
- Don Whitaker – bass (tracks 1–3, 5–7)
- Phil Stephens – bass (tracks 4 and 8)
- Nick Fatool – drums
