= The King Sisters =

American vocal group

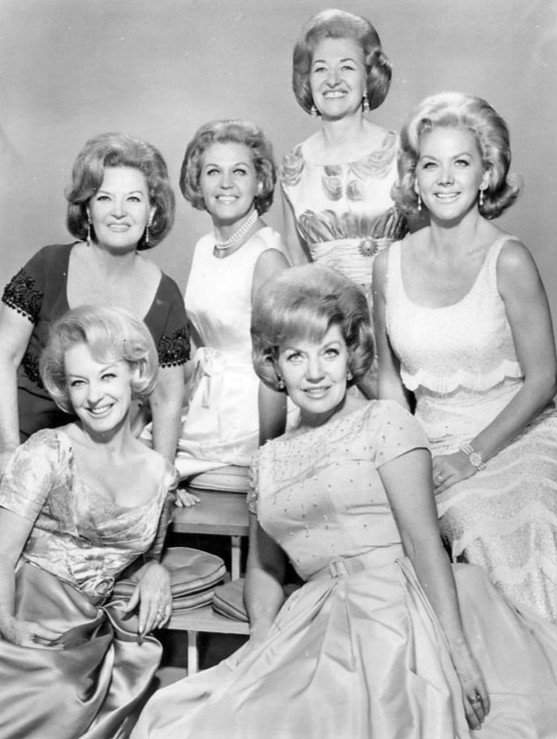
- Seated from left: Yvonne, Alyce. Standing: Donna, Luise, Maxine, Marilyn, 1964.

Background information
- Genres: Swing music; big band
- Labels: Capitol; Warner Bros.; RCA Victor; Bluebird
- Past members: Alyce King; Donna King; Luise King; Marilyn King; Maxine King; Yvonne King
- Website: www.officialkingfamily.com

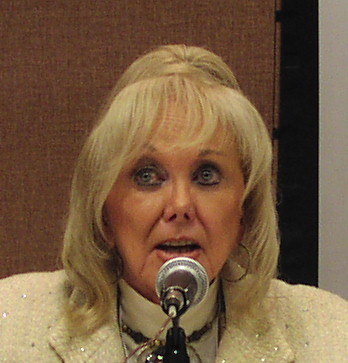
Marilyn King in May 2009. At the time, Marilyn was one of the three sisters still living.

The King Sisters were an American big band-era vocal group, appearing as a trio or quartet. Six sisters were in the group at one time or another: Alyce, Donna, Luise, Marilyn, Maxine, and Yvonne King.

== History ==
Born and raised in Pleasant Grove, Utah, the King sisters were part of the Driggs family of entertainers. They were members of the Church of Jesus Christ of Latter-day Saints. Their father was William King Driggs.

Their first professional job was with a Salt Lake City radio station, from which they graduated to a station in Oakland, California. In the early 1930s sisters Luise, Maxine, and Alyce formed a vocal trio along the lines of their idols, the Boswell Sisters, and traveled to San Francisco to audition for radio station KGO (to replace the Boswell Sisters themselves, who were leaving the station). After this, Maxine retired to home life in Oakland and sisters Donna and Yvonne were added to the roster.

In 1935, the King Sisters accepted a job with bandleader Horace Heidt. Their employment was on-again, off-again, with the sisters leaving the band in November 1935 to return to their home state, only to be rehired by Heidt the next year. In the following years, the sisters sang separately and together with the bands of Artie Shaw's Old Gold program and Charlie Barnet and Al Pearce series. They turned down a request to be the vocal group for the Glenn Miller Orchestra. They recorded for Bluebird Records, a sub-label of RCA Victor and the same label as Miller, and also had their first hit with a vocal version of Miller's hit "In the Mood".

In 1937, Luise married Horace Heidt's guitarist, Alvino Rey. Rey left the Heidt orchestra to form his own band, and the King Sisters became Rey's resident vocalists.

Most vintage-movie fans know the group as The Four King Sisters: Yvonne, Luise, Alyce, and Donna. The foursome made their first appearance in the 1939 musical Second Fiddle (1939) and went on to be featured in a number of 1940s Hollywood films, both feature-length and short-subject musicals, as well as three-minute Soundies musicals filmed for coin-operated film jukeboxes. During World War II, they appeared regularly on Kay Kyser's radio series.

In late 1953, Alyce, Yvonne, and Marilyn joined Gene Autry's Melody Ranch on CBS Radio as the Gene Autry Blue Jeans, replacing the Pinafores (Eunice, Beulah, and Ione Kettle), and continued there along with Alvino Rey until the program's end in early May 1956.

In 1965, the King Sisters began hosting their own ABC TV series, The King Family Show, which featured family members including Alyce's husband, actor Robert Clarke, and her sons Ric de Azevedo, pianist-arranger Lex de Azevedo, and Cam Clarke, as well as other talent. The show ran from 1965 to 1966, with a 1969 revival.

A second generation of the King Family, the Four King Cousins, carries on the musical tradition. More prominently, Luise's grandsons Win and William Butler are also musicians as part of the rock band Arcade Fire.

== Deaths ==
Alyce King Clarke died on August 23, 1996, from respiratory problems, aged 81. Luise King Rey died on August 4, 1997, aged 83, from cancer, in the year of her 60th wedding anniversary to Alvino Rey. Donna King Conkling died on June 16, 2007, aged 88, in Plano, Texas. Maxine King Thomas died on May 13, 2009, aged 97 in Corona, California. Yvonne "Vonnie" King Burch died on December 13, 2009, aged 89, after suffering a fall at her home in Santa Barbara, California. Marilyn King died on August 7, 2013, aged 82, from cancer, also in California; she was the last surviving sister.

== Discography ==
=== Hit singles ===
Year	Single	Chart positions	
Year	Single	US	US Country
1937	"Hot Lips"	5	—
1937	"Oh Marie-Oh, Marie"	12	—
1937	"It's the Natural Thing to Do"	5	—
1937	"Little Heaven of the Seven Seas"	3	—
1941	"Tiger Rag"	23	—
1941	"Nighty Night"	13	—
1941	"The Hut-Sut Song (A Swedish Serenade)"	7	—
1941	"Bless 'Em All"	25	—
1942	"I Said No!"	2	—
1942	"Rose O'Day"	18	—
1942	"Arthur Murray Taught Me Dancing in a Hurry"	21	—
1942	"Idaho"	3	—
1942	"My Devotion"	11	—
1942	"When It's Moonlight on the Blue Pacific"	22	—
1942	"Strip Polka"	6	—
1943	"Gobs of Love"	20	—
1943	"The Army Air Corps"	19	—
1944	"I'll Get By (As Long as I Have You)"	12	—
1944	"It's Love-Love-Love"	4	—
1944	"Mairzy Doats"	21	—
1944	"Milkman, Keep Those Bottles Quiet"	13	—
1944	"The Trolley Song"	13	—
1945	"Candy"	15	—
1945	"Saturday Night (Is the Loneliest Night of the Week)"	15	—
1946	"Divorce Me C.O.D." (featuring Buddy Cole's orchestra)	—	5

=== Albums ===
- Aloha (Capitol Records, 1957)
- Imagination (Capitol Records, 1958)
- Warm and Wonderful (Capitol Records, 1959)
- Baby, They're Singing Our Song (Capitol Records, 1960)
- Love At Home With Members Of The Famous King Family mainly compilation of 1950s and 1960s Capitol recordings (Capitol Records, 1965)
- TV's Wonderful King Sisters (Capitol Records, 1965)
- The New Sounds of the Fabulous King Sisters (Warner Bros. Records, 1966)

=== Compilations of 1930s, 1940s recordings ===
- The Uncollected The King Sisters With Frank DeVol's Orchestra 1947 With Frank DeVol's Orchestra (Hindsight Records, 1994)
- Everybody loves my baby The King Sisters With Frank DeVol's Orchestra (Hindsight Records 1995)
- Spotlight On... The King Sisters (Capitol Records, 1995)
- The King Sisters, Vol. 4 1939 - 1941 (Ajazz Records, n.d.)
- The King Sisters, Vol. 5 1941 (Ajazz Records, n.d.)
- The King Sisters, Volume 6 1942 (Ajazz Records, n.d.)
- It's Love, Love, Love (Living Era, 2005)
- Imagination: The Blend and The Elegance (Jasmine, UK, 2012)

=== Side-work ===
Horace Heidt and His Brigadiers

- Introducing The King Sisters – Introducing The King Sisters 1937-1938 (Collectibles, 2006)

Alvino Rey

- Uncollected 1940-1941 (Hindsight Records, 1983)

=== As part of the King Family ===
See latter 1960s recordings supporting The King Family Show
