= Michael Costner =

Fictional superhero in DC Comics

OMAC
- Michael Costner / OMAC as depicted in OMAC #1 (September 2006). Art by Renato Guedes.

Publication information
- Publisher: DC Comics
- First appearance: OMAC #1 (September 2006)
- Created by: Bruce Jones; Allan Goldman

In-story information
- Alter ego: Michael Costner
- Abilities: OMAC physiology; Superhuman strength and durability; Shapeshifting; Heat vision; Access to extensive metahuman database

OMAC (Michael Costner) is a fictional character appearing in American comic books published by DC Comics. Costner was introduced in OMAC #1 (July 2006) and was created by Bruce Jones and Allan Goldman.

== Fictional character biography ==
=== Origin ===
Michael Costner, a seventeen-year-old petty thief, spent his entire life in Gotham City; first as an orphan in care of a local hospital, then scraping his life on the streets, stealing to sate his addiction to heroin.

While at the hospital, Costner is infected with the OMAC nanovirus through a contaminated vaccine. However, Brother Eye never activates Costner's OMAC programming due to losing contact with him. Instead, Brother Eye keeps Costner as a "sleeper agent" who will only activate in times of dire need.

After Brother Eye is nearly destroyed by Sasha Bordeaux, it activates Costner's OMAC programming. While other OMACs have no personality or qualms with used as killing machines, Costner defies his programming and opposes Brother Eye.

Despite the obvious inconsistencies in his programming, Brother Eye orders Costner to steal a hard drive from NORAD to restart the OMAC project at full capacity. Resenting Brother Eye for forcing him to kill and for stealing his personality, Costner flies to outer space, taking enough control of his OMAC form to jettison the hard drive and Brother Eye. Enraged, Brother Eye casts him back to Earth.

=== Later history ===
While on the run, Costner meets Vienna Barstow, a showgirl who falls in love with him. Able to balance his new form, Costner shows an increased control over his body, becoming able to access several OMAC powers in his human form, mostly for Vienna's benefit. At first skeptical and angry at Costner for OMAC's early doings, Vienna softens up, steadily falling in love with him. Brother Eye watches over the two, planning to turn Vienna into a new, more obedient OMAC unit.

Elsewhere, Batman notices strange activities in space and sends Superman to search for Brother Eye. Superman is captured by Brother Eye and held in a kryptonite-laced chamber. He manages to contact Costner, transmitting him Brother Eye's plans about Vienna and the world: to kill every metahuman on Earth to avenge its defeat; and ultimately smash Earth and the Moon together, thus ending a "corrupt" humanity. Moreover, Vienna is now pregnant with Costner's son.

Hoping to stop Costner from garnering enough courage to make a stand, Brother Eye awakens Vienna, now an OMAC, and sends her to kill Costner. Costner shocks Vienna into control by telling her of her pregnancy and reminding her about their previous charade. As Superman battles Brother Eye, Vienna sacrifices herself to destroy the atomic furnace that sustains it.

== Powers and abilities ==
As an OMAC, Michael Costner is able to access the extensive knowledge on metahumans stored by Brother Eye, shapeshift parts of his body, and enlarge his body mass. He later gains the ability to use his invulnerability, heat vision, and shapeshifting abilities in human form.
