= Chris Conkling =

American writer

- Born: Jon Christopher Conkling; Los Angeles, California, U.S.
- Occupations: Screenwriter, author, educator
- Spouse: Robin Conkling
- Children: 6

Jon Christopher Conkling is an American writer. He is best known as the co-writer of the screenplay for the animated version of Lord of the Rings, directed by Ralph Bakshi and produced by Saul Zaentz. He has also published articles in BYU Studies, the Journal of Book of Mormon Studies and the Ensign, and wrote the 1979 book A Joseph Smith Chronology and an award-winning article on Melville's "Bartleby The Scrivener."

== Education ==
Conkling studied at the University of California, Los Angeles, Dartmouth College, Brigham Young University, California State University, Dominguez Hills, and California State University, Northridge from which he received his teaching credentials.

== Career ==
He wrote six complete scripts in an attempt to find the right approach for Bakshi's version of Lord of the Rings—one covered only a third of the epic, one tried to fit the entire saga into a single film, one tried to cut it in half; one version even focused on a re-telling by Pippin and Merry. There was a good deal of experimentation as to how to approach the enormous saga. Eventually, popular science fiction novelist, Peter S. Beagle, was called in to do some revisions, although Conkling still retained first credit on the final version. Lord of the Rings was nominated for a Hugo Award.

He was a story consultant for the 1977 BYU Film Studio film The Mailbox and wrote The Emmitt Smith Story for BYU. He also wrote several management videos which appeared on PBS, and was a writer for ABC's television series The Hardy Boys.

Conkling has taught a variety of courses at the American Jewish University in Bel-Air, California. Prior to this he worked in advertising and public relations for several oil companies and Pool/Sarraille Advertising of Beverly Hills. He also wrote a paper entitled "The Dark Ages: The L.D.S. Church and Japan, 1924-1948" which is held by the Church History Archives and has been used as a source for published work by R. Lanier Britsch.

At AJU Chris Conkling created courses in literature of utopia and literature of evil, taught ancient Greek and Roman literature, and was faculty advisor for several years on the student newspaper. He currently works as a 12th grade English teacher and creative writing teacher at Sylmar High School's Math/Science Magnet in Sylmar, CA.
