= Alvino Rey =

American jazz guitarist and bandleader (1908–2004)

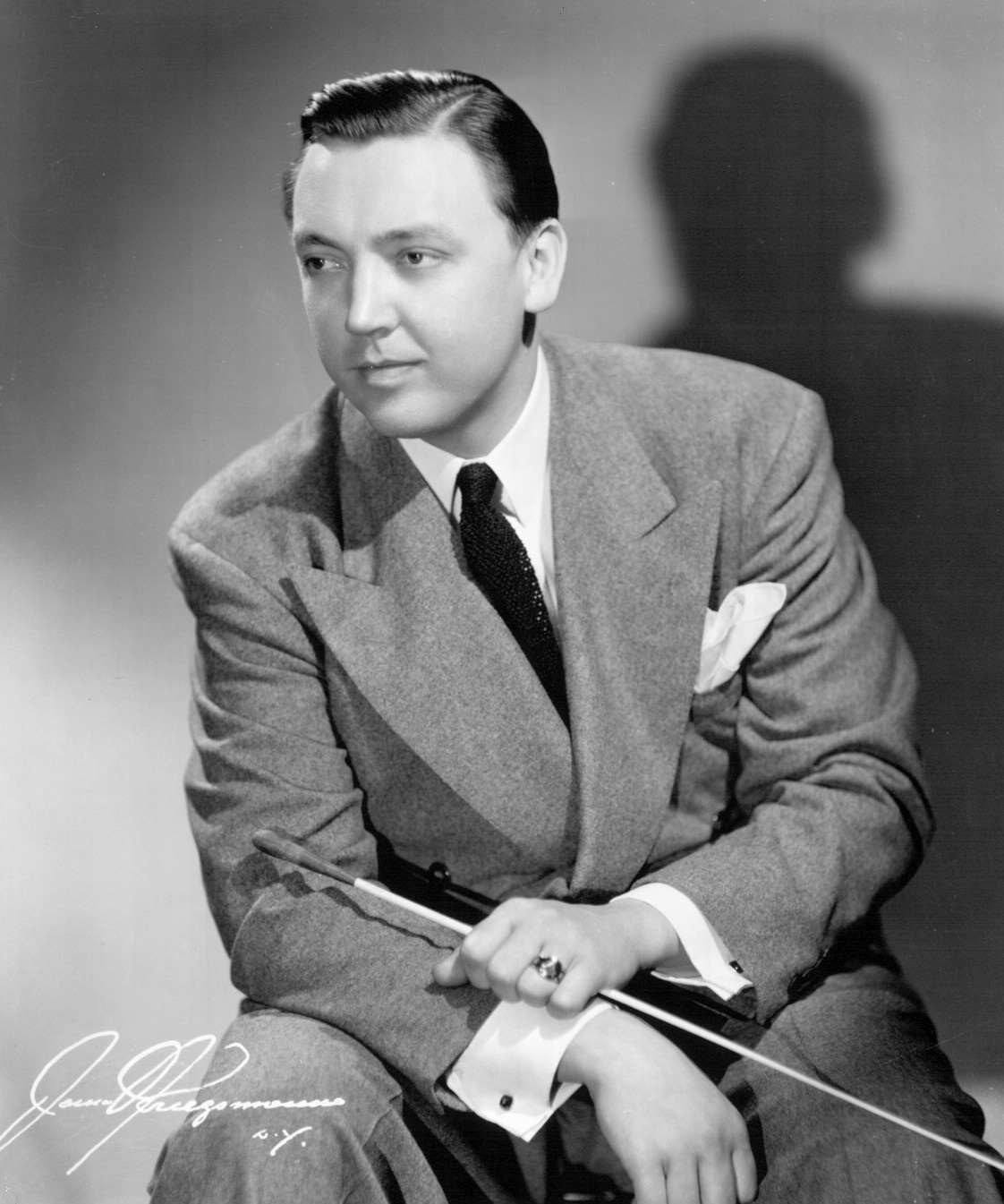
- Rey in c.1942

Background information
- Born: Alvin Henry McBurney; July 1, 1908; Oakland, California, U.S.
- Died: February 24, 2004 (aged 95) Salt Lake City, Utah, U.S.
- Genres: Jazz, swing
- Occupations: Musician, musical director, inventor
- Instruments: Guitar, steel guitar
- Years active: 1927–1994

Alvin McBurney (July 1, 1908 – February 24, 2004), known by his stage name Alvino Rey, was an American jazz guitarist and bandleader.

== Career ==
Alvin McBurney was born in Oakland, California, United States, but grew up in Cleveland, Ohio. Early in life, he had a knack for music and electronics. In his teens, he was given a banjo as a birthday present. His professional career began in 1927, when he got a job playing banjo with Cleveland bandleader Ev Jones. During the following year, he became a member of the Phil Spitalny Orchestra. He switched from banjo to guitar, then changed his name to Alvino Rey to take advantage of the popularity of Latin music in New York City at the time.

From 1932 to 1938, he was a member of Horace Heidt and His Musical Knights. He drew attention to himself and the band when he started playing steel guitar. The Gibson corporation asked him to develop a pickup for the first electric guitar, the ES-150. In 1937, he married Luise King of the King Sisters.

In 1939, he formed his own band with the King Sisters and moved to Hollywood, where he became musical director at KHJ Mutual Broadcasting radio network. As leader of the house band, he recorded a version of "Deep in the Heart of Texas" that was a hit in 1942. During the same year he hired Al Cohn, Ray Conniff, Neal Hefti, Zoot Sims, and arranger Billy May. In the 1940s, he also worked with saxophonist Herbie Steward, drummer Dave Tough, and arrangers Nelson Riddle, Johnny Mandel, and George Handy.

The band did not record in 1943 due to the musicians' strike. The band broke up, and Rey found work at Lockheed as a mechanic. In 1944, he enlisted in the U.S. Navy, where he worked on radar systems and directed a band. After his service, he formed an orchestra that had 15 horns and recorded a cover version of "Cement Mixer" by Slim Gaillard that became a hit. During the 1950s, he played steel guitar in small groups, often with Buddy Cole, his brother-in-law.

Beginning about 1957, Rey produced many of the George Greeley piano recordings for Warner Bros. Records.

During the 1960s, he was music director for The King Family Show with the King Sisters. Rey made frequent appearances on the show performing "the Alvino Rey Talking Guitar", which was in fact a pedal steel. He also played steel guitar in recording sessions with Jack Costanzo, George Cates, Esquivel, and the studio group the Surfmen. These musicians were associated with the short-lived genre exotica, which combined Hawaiian music, Latin music, lounge jazz, and unconventional instruments from Burma and Indonesia. In 1978, he was inducted into the Steel Guitar Hall of Fame.

In the early 1990s, Rey moved with his wife Luise to her native Utah. In Salt Lake City, he formed a jazz quartet who played in local clubs, sometimes with Luise sitting in. He retired from performing in 1994. Luise died in 1997 after 60 years of marriage. In 2004, after breaking his hip and suffering complications including pneumonia and congestive heart failure, Rey died at the age of 95 at a rehabilitation center.

== Pioneer of electrified instruments ==
Rey amplified his banjo in the 1920s. In 1935, Gibson hired him to develop a prototype pickup with engineers at the Lyon & Healy company in Chicago, based on the one he developed for his banjo. The result was used for Gibson's first electric guitar, the ES-150. The prototype is kept in the Museum of Pop Culture in Seattle.

In 1939, Rey invented an early version of a "talk box" device that modified the sound of his electric steel guitar to sound like words. For performances of his big band, he created an animated mechanical character he named "Stringy", shaped like a guitar, that "sang" the altered guitar sounds. A later commercial version of the talk box, using a different technology developed by Bob Heil, was made famous by guitarist Peter Frampton.

Around 1959 to 1960, Rey collaborated with composer Euel Box of PAMS Productions of Dallas to bring his distinctive pedal steel guitar sounds to radio jingles. This jingle package was part of the new top-40 radio format and was heard on such innovative radio stations as KBOX in Dallas and WFUN Miami. Rey is also credited with inspiring the later, ground-breaking "Sonosational" PAMS Jingles Series 18 in 1961, which featured the talking or singing instrument effects of Rey's "sonovox".

== Personal life ==
Rey was the maternal grandfather of American musicians Win Butler and Will Butler, who were both in the band Arcade Fire.

== Discography ==
=== As leader ===
- Swingin' Fling (Capitol, 1958)
- Refreshing Melodies (Sacred, 1958; reissued 1976)
- My Reverie (Decca, 1959)
- Ping-Pong! (Capitol, 1960)
- That Lonely Feeling (Capitol, 1960)
- Alvino Rey! ...His Greatest Hits [re-recordings] (Dot, 1961)
- As I Remember Hawaii (Dot, 1962)
- The Big Band Steel Guitar (Steel Guitar Record Club, 1977)
- Dance With Me ...The Big Band Sound of Alvino Rey (Alysa, 1978)
- The Greatest Jazz Band (Alysa, 1979)

=== As sideman ===
- Joe "Fingers" Carr, The Riotous, Raucous, Red-Hot 20's! (Warner Bros., 1961)
- George Cates, George Cates' Polynesian Percussion (Dot, 1961)
- Elvis Presley, Blue Hawaii (RCA Victor, 1961)
- Stan Kenton and Tex Ritter, Stan Kenton! Tex Ritter! (Capitol, 1962)
- Kirby Stone Four, Frank Loesser's Broadway Hit 'Guys & Dolls' (Columbia, 1962)

== Sources ==
- Jazz Journalists Association
- SpaceAgePop.com
- Saxon, Wolfgang (February 27, 2004). "Alvino Rey Is Dead at 95; Virtuoso of the Steel Guitar". The New York Times.
