= Buddy Cole (musician) =

American jazz pianist and orchestra leader (1916–1964)

- Born: Edwin LeMar Cole; December 15, 1916; Irving, Illinois, U.S.
- Died: November 5, 1964 (aged 47) Hollywood, California, U.S.
- Genres: Jazz
- Occupation: Musician
- Instruments: Piano; organ
- Years active: 1925–1964

Edwin LeMar "Buddy" Cole (December 15, 1916 – November 5, 1964) was a jazz pianist, organist, orchestra leader, and composer. He played behind a number of pop singers, including Rosemary Clooney and Bing Crosby.

== Biography ==
Cole was born in Irving, Illinois, on December 15, 1916 and the family moved to California when he was two. One of his two sisters - Bertie - played for silent movies and Buddy would watch as a little boy. At the age of ten, he debuted on the theater piano, filling in for someone who had not turned up. He started his musical career in the theater playing between movies and his first keyboard job was as theater organist at Los Angeles' Figueroa Theater. He was recruited to be part of Gil Evans's band at the age of 19. In Hollywood in the second half of the 1930s Cole played in dance bands, including those led by Alvino Rey and Frankie Trumbauer. He married Yvonne King, member of The King Sisters, in 1940 and they had two daughters, Christine and Cathleen. They divorced in 1953. He married Regina Woodruff (known as Clare) on November 12, 1955 in Las Vegas but they separated on July 6, 1956 prior to a divorce on September 20 the same year. As soon as the divorce became final, Cole and Clare remarried in Los Angeles on November 12, 1957. From the 1940s, his main work was as a studio musician, utilizing piano, electric organ, celeste, harpsichord and Novachord.

In 1945 his own album Piano Cocktails reached No. 5 in the US. Later in 1947, Cole joined the John Scott Trotter Orchestra working for Bing Crosby on his radio shows and he remained with Trotter until 1954. Crosby then dispensed with the services of a large orchestra and instead employed Cole and his trio to support him on his radio programs such as The Bing Crosby Show and The Bing Crosby – Rosemary Clooney Show. Cole performed on Bing Crosby's hits "In a Little Spanish Town" and "Ol' Man River", and on the albums Some Fine Old Chestnuts and New Tricks. Cole also played on Rosemary Clooney's radio program; some recordings from the show were released on the album Swing Around Rosie.

In his capacity as a studio musician, Cole worked with Henry Mancini, who used his Hammond organ sound for the soundtrack to the TV series Mr. Lucky. Cole also recorded several organ albums for Warner Brothers, Columbia, Alshire and Doric.

Cole played most of the piano parts in the 1951 film Young Man with a Horn, subbing for Hoagy Carmichael, who appeared on screen. Cole also wrote the music for the television game show Truth or Consequences. He died in Hollywood on November 5, 1964.
