= List of children's animated films =

This is a list of animated films aimed primarily at children. The films are designed to hold children's attention and often have an educational dimension, particularly around cultural values. This list has all the animated films that are always dubbed in North-West Europe, Poland, Portugal, Balkan, Baltic and Nordic countries, where generally only children's movies and television shows (including all the animated movies on this page) are dubbed.

== 1920s ==
=== 1926 ===
- The Adventures of Prince Achmed

== 1930s ==
=== 1935 ===
- The New Gulliver

=== 1937 ===
- Snow White and the Seven Dwarfs
- The Tale of the Fox

=== 1939 ===
- Gulliver's Travels

== 1940s ==
=== 1940 ===
- Pinocchio

=== 1941 ===
- Dumbo
- Mr. Bug Goes to Town

=== 1942 ===
- Bambi
- Saludos Amigos

=== 1946 ===
- Song of the South

=== 1947 ===
- Fun and Fancy Free

=== 1948 ===
- So Dear to My Heart

=== 1949 ===
- The Adventures of Ichabod and Mr. Toad

== 1950s ==
=== 1950 ===
- Cinderella

=== 1951 ===
- Alice in Wonderland
- Amazon Symphony

=== 1953 ===
- Peter Pan

=== 1955 ===
- Lady and the Tramp

=== 1957 ===
- The Snow Queen

=== 1958 ===
- Panda and the Magic Serpent

=== 1959 ===
- 1001 Arabian Nights
- Magic Boy
- Sleeping Beauty

== 1960s ==
=== 1960 ===
- Alakazam the Great

=== 1961 ===
- One Hundred and One Dalmatians

=== 1962 ===
- Gay Purr-ee
- Mister Magoo's Christmas Carol
- The Wild Swans

=== 1963 ===
- The Little Prince and the Eight-Headed Dragon
- The Sword in the Stone

=== 1964 ===
- Hey There, It's Yogi Bear!
- Return to Oz
- Rudolph the Red-Nosed Reindeer

=== 1965 ===
- Gulliver's Travels Beyond the Moon
- The Man from Button Willow
- Pinocchio in Outer Space
- Willy McBean and His Magic Machine

=== 1966 ===
- Alice in Wonderland or What's a Nice Kid like You Doing in a Place like This?
- Alice of Wonderland in Paris
- The Daydreamer
- The Man Called Flintstone

=== 1967 ===
- Asterix the Gaul
- Jack and the Beanstalk
- Jack and the Witch
- The Jungle Book
- Mad Monster Party?
- The Wacky World of Mother Goose

=== 1968 ===
- Asterix and Cleopatra
- The Great Adventure of Horus, Prince of the Sun
- The Magic Bird
- The Mouse on the Mayflower
- The World of Hans Christian Andersen

=== 1969 ===
- A Boy Named Charlie Brown
- Tintin and the Temple of the Sun
- The Wonderful World of Puss 'n Boots

== 1970s ==
=== 1970 ===
- Aladdin and His Magic Lamp
- The Aristocats
- Dougal and the Blue Cat
- Nobody's Boy
- The Phantom Tollbooth
- Santa and the Three Bears
- Santa Claus Is Comin' to Town

=== 1971 ===
- Animal Treasure Island
- A Christmas Carol
- Daisy Town
- Here Comes Peter Cottontail

=== 1972 ===
- The Adventures of Pinocchio
- The Adventures of Robin Hoodnik
- Daffy Duck and Porky Pig Meet the Groovie Goolies
- Journey Back to Oz
- Marco Polo Junior Versus the Red Dragon
- Nanny and the Professor
- Oliver and the Artful Dodger
- Popeye Meets the Man Who Hated Laughter
- Snoopy Come Home
- Tintin and the Lake of Sharks
- Yogi's Ark Lark

=== 1973 ===
- Charlotte's Web
- The Mini-Munsters
- Once Upon a Time
- Robin Hood
- The Three Musketeers
- Treasure Island

=== 1974 ===
- Dunderklumpen!
- Jack and the Beanstalk
- Oliver Twist
- Robinson Crusoe
- The Three Musketeers
- The Year Without a Santa Claus

=== 1975 ===
- Hans Christian Andersen’s The Little Mermaid
- Hugo the Hippo
- The Magic Pony
- The Pinchcliffe Grand Prix
- Tubby the Tuba

=== 1976 ===
- Rudolph's Shiny New Year
- The Smurfs and the Magic Flute
- The Twelve Tasks of Asterix

=== 1977 ===
- Dot and the Kangaroo
- The Easter Bunny Is Comin' to Town
- The Hobbit
- The Many Adventures of Winnie the Pooh
- The Mouse and His Child
- Pete's Dragon
- Race for Your Life, Charlie Brown
- Raggedy Ann & Andy: A Musical Adventure
- The Rescuers
- The Wild Swans

=== 1978 ===
- Metamorphoses
- Ringing Bell
- The Stingiest Man in Town
- Grease
- Thumbelina
- The Water Babies

=== 1979 ===
- The Adventure of Sudsakorn
- The Bugs Bunny/Road Runner Movie
- The Little Convict
- Nutcracker Fantasy
- Rudolph and Frosty's Christmas in July
- Scooby Goes Hollywood

== 1980s ==
=== 1980 ===
- Back to the Forest
- Bon Voyage, Charlie Brown (and Don't Come Back!!)
- Doraemon: Nobita's Dinosaur
- The King and the Mockingbird
- The Return of the King: A Story of the Hobbits
- Twelve Months
- Yogi's First Christmas

=== 1981 ===
- Around the World with Dot
- Doraemon: The Records of Nobita, Spaceblazer
- Enchanted Journey
- The Fantastic Adventures of Unico
- The Fox and the Hound
- The Little Fox
- The Looney Looney Looney Bugs Bunny Movie
- The Mystery of the Third Planet
- Swan Lake

=== 1982 ===
- Aladdin and the Magic Lamp
- Bugs Bunny's 3rd Movie: 1001 Rabbit Tales
- Doraemon: Nobita and the Haunts of Evil
- The Flight of Dragons
- Heidi's Song
- The Last Unicorn
- Mighty Mouse in the Great Space Chase
- The Secret of NIMH
- The Wizard of Oz

=== 1983 ===
- Abra Cadabra
- Daffy Duck's Fantastic Island
- Doraemon: Nobita and the Castle of the Undersea Devil
- Dot and the Bunny
- The Dragon That Wasn't (Or Was He?)
- Twice Upon a Time
- Unico in the Island of Magic
- Where the Toys Come From
- The Wind in the Willows

=== 1984 ===
- Doraemon: Nobita's Great Adventure into the Underworld
- Gallavants
- John the Fearless
- The Old Curiosity Shop
- Samson & Sally
- The Tale of Tsar Saltan

=== 1985 ===
- The Adventures of Mark Twain
- Asterix Versus Caesar
- The Black Cauldron
- The Care Bears Movie
- Doraemon: Nobita's Little Star Wars
- He-Man and She-Ra: The Secret of the Sword
- Here Come the Littles
- A Journey Through Fairyland
- The Pickwick Papers
- Rainbow Brite and the Star Stealer
- Star Fairies

=== 1986 ===
- The Adventures of the American Rabbit
- The Adventures of Scamper the Penguin
- An American Tail
- Asterix in Britain
- Care Bears Movie II: A New Generation
- Castle in the Sky
- Doraemon: Nobita and the Steel Troops
- The Elm-Chanted Forest
- GoBots: Battle of the Rock Lords
- The Great Cheese Robbery
- The Great Mouse Detective
- Heathcliff: The Movie
- My Little Pony: The Movie
- Super Mario Bros.: The Great Mission to Rescue Princess Peach!
- The Transformers: The Movie
- Valhalla

=== 1987 ===
- The Brave Little Toaster
- The Care Bears Adventure in Wonderland
- The Chipmunk Adventure
- Doraemon: Nobita and the Knights on Dinosaurs
- G.I. Joe: The Movie
- The Jetsons Meet the Flintstones
- Pinocchio and the Emperor of the Night
- The Puppetoon Movie
- Scooby-Doo Meets the Boo Brothers
- Top Cat and the Beverly Hills Cats
- Ultraman: The Adventure Begins
- The Wind in the Willows
- Yogi Bear and the Magical Flight of the Spruce Goose
- Yogi's Great Escape

=== 1988 ===
- BraveStarr: The Movie
- Care Bears Nutcracker Suite
- Daffy Duck's Quackbusters
- David and the Magic Pearl
- Doraemon: The Record of Nobita's Parallel Visit to the West
- Felix the Cat: The Movie
- The Good, the Bad, and Huckleberry Hound
- The Land Before Time
- My Neighbor Totoro
- Oliver & Company
- Pound Puppies and the Legend of Big Paw
- Rockin' with Judy Jetson
- Scooby-Doo and the Ghoul School
- Scooby-Doo! and the Reluctant Werewolf
- Stowaways on the Ark
- Willy the Sparrow
- Yogi and the Invasion of the Space Bears

=== 1989 ===
- A Tale of Two Toads
- All Dogs Go to Heaven
- Asterix and the Big Fight
- Babar: The Movie
- The BFG
- Doraemon: Nobita and the Birth of Japan
- Kiki's Delivery Service
- The Little Mermaid
- Little Nemo: Adventures in Slumberland

== 1990s ==
=== 1990 ===
- DuckTales the Movie: Treasure of the Lost Lamp
- Doraemon: Nobita and the Animal Planet
- The Fool of the World and the Flying Ship
- Jetsons: The Movie
- The Nutcracker Prince
- Peter in Magicland
- The Rescuers Down Under

=== 1991 ===
- An American Tail: Fievel Goes West
- Beauty and the Beast
- Doraemon: Nobita's Dorabian Nights
- The Princess and the Goblin
- Rock-a-Doodle
- The Seventh Brother

=== 1992 ===
- Aladdin
- Beauty and the Beast
- Blinky Bill
- The Boy and the King
- Doraemon: Nobita and the Kingdom of Clouds
- FernGully: The Last Rainforest
- Freddie as F.R.O.7
- Porco Rosso
- The Thief and the Cobbler
- The Three Musketeers
- Tiny Toon Adventures: How I Spent My Vacation
- Tom and Jerry: The Movie

=== 1993 ===
- Batman: Mask of the Phantasm
- Doraemon: Nobita and the Tin Labyrinth
- Happily Ever After
- The Nightmare Before Christmas
- Once Upon a Forest
- Sailor Moon R: The Movie
- Sinbad
- We're Back! A Dinosaur's Story

=== 1994 ===
- Asterix Conquers America
- Cinderella
- Doraemon: Nobita's Three Visionary Swordsmen
- The Land Before Time II: The Great Valley Adventure
- The Lion King
- The Pagemaster
- Pocahontas
- Pom Poko
- The Return of Jafar
- Sailor Moon S: The Movie
- Scooby-Doo! in Arabian Nights
- The Swan Princess
- Thumbelina
- A Troll in Central Park

=== 1995 ===
- Balto
- Catnapped!
- Doraemon: Nobita's Diary on the Creation of the World
- Gargoyles the Movie: The Heroes Awaken
- A Goofy Movie
- Gumby: The Movie
- Jonny Quest vs. The Cyber Insects
- The Land Before Time III: The Time of the Great Giving
- Little Red Riding Hood
- The Pebble and the Penguin
- Pocahontas
- Sailor Moon Super S: The Movie
- The Tale of Tillie's Dragon
- Toy Story
- The Wind in the Willows

=== 1996 ===
- Aladdin and the King of Thieves
- All Dogs Go to Heaven 2
- Doraemon: Nobita and the Galaxy Super-express
- How the Toys Saved Christmas
- The Hunchback of Notre Dame
- James and the Giant Peach
- The Land Before Time IV: Journey Through the Mists
- Space Jam

=== 1997 ===
- Anastasia
- Beauty and the Beast: The Enchanted Christmas
- The Brave Little Toaster to the Rescue
- Doraemon: Nobita and the Spiral City
- Cats Don't Dance
- A Christmas Carol
- The Fearless Four
- Hercules
- The Land Before Time V: The Mysterious Island
- Pippi Longstocking
- Pooh's Grand Adventure: The Search for Christopher Robin
- The Swan Princess II: Escape from Castle Mountain

=== 1998 ===
- An All Dogs Christmas Carol
- An American Tail: The Treasure of Manhattan Island
- Beauty and the Beast: Belle's Magical World
- The Brave Little Toaster Goes to Mars
- A Bug's Life
- Doraemon: Nobita's Great Adventure in the South Seas
- FernGully 2: The Magical Rescue
- Hercules and Xena – The Animated Movie: The Battle for Mount Olympus
- Hercules: Zero to Hero
- The Land Before Time VI: The Secret of Saurus Rock
- The Lion King II: Simba's Pride
- The Mighty Kong
- Mulan
- Pocahontas II: Journey to a New World
- Pokémon: The First Movie
- The Prince of Egypt
- Quest for Camelot
- Rudolph the Red-Nosed Reindeer: The Movie
- The Rugrats Movie
- Scooby-Doo on Zombie Island
- The Secret of NIMH 2: Timmy to the Rescue
- The Swan Princess: The Mystery of the Enchanted Kingdom

=== 1999 ===
- Alvin and the Chipmunks Meet Frankenstein
- Babar: King of the Elephants
- Bartok the Magnificent
- Belle's Tales of Friendship
- Cardcaptor Sakura: The Movie
- Doug's 1st Movie
- Doraemon: Nobita Drifts in the Universe
- Faeries
- The Iron Giant
- The King and I
- Madeline: Lost in Paris
- The Nuttiest Nutcracker
- Pokémon: The Movie 2000
- Scooby-Doo! and the Witch's Ghost
- Stuart Little
- Tarzan
- Toy Story 2
- Wakko's Wish

== 2000s ==
=== 2000 ===
- Alvin and the Chipmunks Meet the Wolfman
- Blue's Big Musical Movie
- Buzz Lightyear of Star Command: The Adventure Begins
- Cardcaptor Sakura Movie 2: The Sealed Card
- Casper's Haunted Christmas
- Chicken Run
- Doraemon: Nobita and the Legend of the Sun King
- Digimon: The Movie
- Dinosaur
- The Emperor's New Groove
- An Extremely Goofy Movie
- Franklin and the Green Knight
- Help! I'm a Fish
- Joseph: King of Dreams
- The Land Before Time VII: The Stone of Cold Fire
- The Life & Adventures of Santa Claus
- Lion of Oz
- The Little Mermaid II: Return to the Sea
- Monster Mash
- Pokémon 3: The Movie
- Pokémon: Mewtwo Returns
- Rugrats in Paris: The Movie
- The Scarecrow
- Scooby-Doo and the Alien Invaders
- The Tangerine Bear
- The Tigger Movie
- Titan A.E.
- Tom Sawyer
- Tweety's High Flying Adventure

=== 2001 ===
- Atlantis: The Lost Empire
- Barbie in the Nutcracker
- The Book of Pooh: Stories from the Heart
- Doraemon: Nobita and the Winged Braves
- Franklin's Magic Christmas
- The Happy Cricket
- The Jar: A Tale from the East
- Jimmy Neutron: Boy Genius
- Lady and the Tramp II: Scamp's Adventure
- The Land Before Time VIII: The Big Freeze
- The Little Bear Movie
- Mickey's Magical Christmas: Snowed in at the House of Mouse
- Monsters, Inc.
- My Life as McDull
- Osmosis Jones
- Pokémon 4Ever
- Recess: School's Out
- Rudolph the Red-Nosed Reindeer and the Island of Misfit Toys
- Scooby-Doo and the Cyber Chase
- Shrek
- Spirited Away
- The Trumpet of the Swan

=== 2002 ===
- The Adventures of Tom Thumb and Thumbelina
- The Archies in JugMan
- Balto II: Wolf Quest
- Barbie as Rapunzel
- The Cat Returns
- Cinderella II: Dreams Come True
- Doraemon: Nobita in the Robot Kingdom
- Dennis the Menace: Cruise Control
- Dibu 3
- Groove Squad
- Hey Arnold!: The Movie
- The Hunchback of Notre Dame II
- Ice Age
- Jonah: A VeggieTales Movie
- The Land Before Time IX: Journey to Big Water
- Lilo & Stitch
- Mickey's House of Villains
- Pokémon Heroes
- The Powerpuff Girls Movie
- The Princess and the Pea
- Return to Never Land
- Sabrina: Friends Forever
- Spirit: Stallion of the Cimarron
- Stuart Little 2
- Tarzan & Jane
- Tom and Jerry: The Magic Ring
- Treasure Planet
- The Wild Thornberrys Movie
- Winnie the Pooh: A Very Merry Pooh Year

=== 2003 ===
- 101 Dalmatians II: Patch's London Adventure
- Atlantis: Milo's Return
- Baby Looney Tunes' Eggs-traordinary Adventure
- Back to School with Franklin
- Barbie of Swan Lake
- Batman: Mystery of the Batwoman
- Brother Bear
- Charlotte's Web 2: Wilbur's Great Adventure
- Doraemon: Nobita and the Windmasters
- Finding Nemo
- Hot Wheels World Race
- The Jungle Book 2
- Kim Possible Movie: A Sitch in Time
- The Land Before Time X: The Great Longneck Migration
- Looney Tunes: Back in Action
- Miss Spider's Sunny Patch Kids
- Piglet's Big Movie
- Pokémon: Jirachi Wish Maker
- Recess: All Growed Down
- Recess: Taking the Fifth Grade
- Rescue Heroes: The Movie
- Rugrats Go Wild
- Scary Godmother: Halloween Spooktakular
- Scooby-Doo! and the Legend of the Vampire
- Scooby-Doo! and the Monster of Mexico
- Sinbad: Legend of the Seven Seas
- Stitch! The Movie

=== 2004 ===
- Barbie as the Princess and the Pauper
- Boo, Zino & the Snurks
- Care Bears: Journey to Joke-a-lot
- Clifford's Really Big Movie
- Doraemon: Nobita in the Wan-Nyan Spacetime Odyssey
- Home on the Range
- Howl's Moving Castle
- The Incredibles
- In Search of Santa
- Kangaroo Jack: G'Day U.S.A.!
- The Lion King 1½
- Mickey, Donald, Goofy: The Three Musketeers
- Mickey's Twice Upon a Christmas
- Mulan II
- My Scene: Jammin' in Jamaica
- Pinocchio 3000
- Pokémon: Destiny Deoxys
- Scooby-Doo! and the Loch Ness Monster
- Shark Tale
- Shrek 2
- The SpongeBob SquarePants Movie
- Spookley the Square Pumpkin
- Teacher's Pet
- Winnie the Pooh: Springtime with Roo
- Yu-Gi-Oh! The Movie: Pyramid of Light

=== 2005 ===
- Aloha, Scooby-Doo!
- Balto III: Wings of Change
- Barbie and the Magic of Pegasus
- Barbie: Fairytopia
- The Batman vs. Dracula
- Candy Land: The Great Lollipop Adventure
- The Care Bears' Big Wish Movie
- Chicken Little
- Corpse Bride
- Digital Monster X-Evolution
- Empress Chung
- The Golden Blaze
- The Happy Elf
- Hoodwinked!
- Hot Wheels AcceleRacers
- Kim Possible Movie: So the Drama
- Kronk's New Groove
- The Land Before Time XI: Invasion of the Tinysauruses
- Lilo & Stitch 2: Stitch Has a Glitch
- Madagascar
- The Magic Roundabout
- My Little Pony: A Very Minty Christmas
- My Scene Goes Hollywood
- Once Upon a Halloween
- Pokémon: Lucario and the Mystery of Mew
- Pooh's Heffalump Halloween Movie
- Pooh's Heffalump Movie
- The Proud Family Movie
- Robots
- Scooby-Doo! in Where's My Mummy?
- Stuart Little 3: Call of the Wild
- Tarzan II
- Tom and Jerry: Blast Off to Mars
- Tom and Jerry: The Fast and the Furry
- Valiant
- Wallace & Gromit: The Curse of the Were-Rabbit

=== 2006 ===
- The Adventures of Brer Rabbit
- The Ant Bully
- Arthur and the Invisibles
- Azur and Asmar
- Bambi II
- The Barbie Diaries
- Barbie in the 12 Dancing Princesses
- Barbie: Mermaidia
- Barnyard
- The Blue Elephant
- Bratz Genie Magic
- Brother Bear 2
- Cars
- Casper's Scare School
- A Christmas Carol
- Codename: Kids Next Door: Operation: Z.E.R.O
- Curious George
- Doraemon: Nobita's Dinosaur 2006
- Everyone's Hero
- Flushed Away
- The Fox and the Hound 2
- Franklin and the Turtle Lake Treasure
- Happy Feet
- Ice Age: The Meltdown
- The Land Before Time XII: The Great Day of the Flyers
- The Legend of Sasquatch
- Leroy & Stitch
- Lotte from Gadgetville
- Monster House
- A Movie of Eggs
- My Little Pony Crystal Princess: The Runaway Rainbow
- My Little Pony: The Princess Promenade
- Open Season
- Over the Hedge
- Pokémon: The Mastermind of Mirage Pokémon
- Pokémon Ranger and the Temple of the Sea
- PollyWorld
- Re-Animated
- Scooby-Doo! Pirates Ahoy!
- Shark Bait
- Stanley's Dinosaur Round-Up
- Strawberry Shortcake: The Sweet Dreams Movie
- Superman: Brainiac Attacks
- Teen Titans: Trouble in Tokyo
- The Thief Lord
- Tom and Jerry: Shiver Me Whiskers
- The Ugly Duckling and Me!
- The Wild

=== 2007 ===
- Barbie as the Island Princess
- Barbie Fairytopia: Magic of the Rainbow
- Bee Movie
- Bratz Kidz: Sleep-Over Adventure
- Brichos
- Care Bears: Oopsy Does It!
- Chill Out, Scooby-Doo!
- Christmas Is Here Again
- Cinderella III: A Twist in Time
- Donkey Xote
- Doraemon: Nobita's New Great Adventure into the Underworld
- Garfield Gets Real
- The Great Discovery
- Happily N'Ever After
- The Land Before Time XIII: The Wisdom of Friends
- Meet the Robinsons
- Mug Travel
- My Little Pony: A Very Pony Place
- Nocturna
- Pokémon: The Rise of Darkrai
- Ratatouille
- Shrek the Third
- Strawberry Shortcake: Berry Blossom Festival
- Strawberry Shortcake: Let's Dance
- Surf's Up
- TMNT
- Tom and Jerry: A Nutcracker Tale
- Winx Club: The Secret of the Lost Kingdom

=== 2008 ===
- Barbie in a Christmas Carol
- Barbie & the Diamond Castle
- Barbie Mariposa
- Bolt
- Dragon Hunters
- Doraemon: Nobita and the Green Giant Legend
- The Flight Before Christmas
- Fly Me to the Moon
- Garfield's Fun Fest
- Horton Hears a Who!
- Igor
- Impy's Island
- Kung Fu Panda
- The Little Mermaid: Ariel's Beginning
- Madagascar: Escape 2 Africa
- Missing Lynx
- Open Season 2
- The Pirates Who Don't Do Anything: A VeggieTales Movie
- Pokémon: Giratina and the Sky Warrior
- Ponyo
- Roadside Romeo
- Scooby-Doo! and the Goblin King
- Space Chimps
- Spirit of the Forest
- Strawberry Shortcake: Rockaberry Roll
- The Tale of Despereaux
- Tinker Bell
- WALL-E
- Wubbzy's Big Movie!

=== 2009 ===
- Alice's Birthday
- Another Egg and Chicken Movie
- Arthur and the Revenge of Maltazard
- Astro Boy
- Barbie and the Three Musketeers
- Barbie Thumbelina
- Cloudy With a Chance of Meatballs
- Coraline
- Curious George 2: Follow That Monkey!
- Doraemon: The Record of Nobita's Spaceblazer
- Ed, Edd n Eddy's Big Picture Show
- Fantastic Mr. Fox
- Happily N'Ever After 2: Snow White Another Bite @ the Apple
- The Happy Cricket and the Giant Bugs
- Thomas & Friends: Hero of the Rails
- Ice Age: Dawn of the Dinosaurs
- Monsters vs. Aliens
- My Little Pony: Twinkle Wish Adventure
- Planet 51
- Pokémon: Arceus and the Jewel of Life
- The Princess and the Frog
- Professor Layton and the Eternal Diva
- Scooby-Doo! and the Samurai Sword
- The Secret of Kells
- The Strawberry Shortcake Movie: Sky's the Limit
- Tinker Bell and the Lost Treasure
- Totally Spies! The Movie
- Turtles Forever
- Up
- Wishology

== 2010s ==
=== 2010 ===
- Alpha and Omega
- Animals United
- Arrietty
- Arthur 3: The War of the Two Worlds
- Barbie: A Fashion Fairytale
- Barbie in A Mermaid Tale
- Care Bears: The Giving Festival
- Care Bears: Share Bear Shines
- Despicable Me
- Doraemon: Nobita's Great Battle of the Mermaid King
- Firebreather
- Gaturro
- How to Train Your Dragon
- Kung Fu Magoo
- Legend of the Guardians: The Owls of Ga'Hoole
- The Legend of Silk Boy
- Lego: The Adventures of Clutch Powers
- Megamind
- Open Season 3
- Pet Pals: Marco Polo's Code
- Plumíferos
- Pokémon: Zoroark: Master of Illusions
- Scooby-Doo! Abracadabra-Doo
- Scooby-Doo! Camp Scare
- Shrek Forever After
- Space Chimps 2: Zartog Strikes Back
- Space Dogs
- Tangled
- Tinker Bell and the Great Fairy Rescue
- Tom and Jerry Meet Sherlock Holmes
- Toy Story 3
- A Turtle's Tale: Sammy's Adventures
- Welcome to the Space Show
- Winx Club 3D: Magical Adventure
- Yogi Bear
- Yu-Gi-Oh!: Bonds Beyond Time

=== 2011 ===
- Arthur Christmas
- Barbie: A Fairy Secret
- Barbie: A Perfect Christmas
- Barbie: Princess Charm School
- Brasil Animado
- Cars 2
- Doraemon: Nobita and the New Steel Troops—Winged Angels
- From Up on Poppy Hill
- Gnomeo & Juliet
- The Great Bear
- Happy Feet Two
- Hoodwinked Too! Hood vs. Evil
- Hop
- Kung Fu Panda 2
- Leafie, A Hen Into the Wild
- Legend of a Rabbit
- A Letter to Momo
- Little Big Panda
- The Little Engine That Could
- A Monster in Paris
- Phineas and Ferb the Movie: Across the 2nd Dimension
- Pokémon the Movie: Black—Victini and Reshiram and White—Victini and Zekrom
- Puss in Boots
- Quest for Zhu
- Rango
- Rio
- Scooby-Doo! Legend of the Phantosaur
- SeeFood
- Snowflake, the White Gorilla
- Tibetan Dog
- Tom and Jerry and the Wizard of Oz
- Top Cat: The Movie
- Winnie the Pooh

=== 2012 ===
- Back to the Sea
- Barbie in A Mermaid Tale 2
- Barbie: The Princess & the Popstar
- Ben 10: Destroy All Aliens
- Big Top Scooby-Doo!
- Brave
- Dino Time
- Doraemon: Nobita and the Island of Miracles—Animal Adventure
- Echo Planet
- Ernest & Celestine
- Frankenweenie
- Hotel Transylvania
- Ice Age: Continental Drift
- The Lorax
- Madagascar 3: Europe's Most Wanted
- The Oogieloves in the Big Balloon Adventure
- Outback
- ParaNorman
- Peixonauta – Agente Secreto da O.S.T.R.A.
- The Pirates! In an Adventure with Scientists!
- Pokémon the Movie: Kyurem vs. the Sword of Justice
- The Reef 2: High Tide
- Rise of the Guardians
- Sammy's Great Escape
- Scooby-Doo! Music of the Vampire
- The Snow Queen
- The Swan Princess Christmas
- Tad, the Lost Explorer
- Tinker Bell and the Secret of the Wings
- Tom and Jerry: Robin Hood and His Merry Mouse
- A Turtle's Tale 2: Sammy's Escape from Paradise
- Wreck-It Ralph
- Wolf Children
- Yak: The Giant King
- Zambezia

=== 2013 ===
- Alpha and Omega 2: A Howl-iday Adventure
- Axel: The Biggest Little Hero
- Barbie & Her Sisters in A Pony Tale
- Barbie: Mariposa & the Fairy Princess
- Barbie in The Pink Shoes
- Cloudy with a Chance of Meatballs 2
- The Croods
- Despicable Me 2
- Doraemon: Nobita's Secret Gadget Museum
- Epic
- Escape from Planet Earth
- Free Birds
- Frozen
- Iron Man & Hulk: Heroes United
- Jungle Master
- Justin and the Knights of Valour
- Khumba
- Legends of Oz: Dorothy's Return
- Monsters University
- Moshi Monsters: The Movie
- My Little Pony: Equestria Girls
- Oggy and the Cockroaches: The Movie
- Planes
- Pokémon the Movie: Genesect and the Legend Awakened
- Pororo, The Racing Adventure
- Scooby-Doo! Mask of the Blue Falcon
- Scooby-Doo! Stage Fright
- Thunder and the House of Magic
- Tom and Jerry's Giant Adventure
- Transformers Prime Beast Hunters: Predacons Rising
- Turbo
- Underdogs

=== 2014 ===
- Alpha and Omega 3: The Great Wolf Games
- Alpha and Omega 4: The Legend of the Saw Tooth Cave
- Asterix and Obelix: Mansion of the Gods
- Barbie: The Pearl Princess
- Barbie and the Secret Door
- Big Hero 6
- The Book of Life
- Boonie Bears: To the Rescue
- The Boxtrolls
- Doraemon: New Nobita's Great Demon—Peko and the Exploration Party of Five
- The Frogville
- Henry & Me
- The Hero of Color City
- How to Train Your Dragon 2
- Iron Man & Captain America: Heroes United
- Jungle Shuffle
- The Lego Movie
- Mr. Peabody & Sherman
- My Little Pony: Equestria Girls – Rainbow Rocks
- The Nut Job
- Penguins of Madagascar
- The Pirate Fairy
- Planes: Fire & Rescue
- Pokémon the Movie: Diancie and the Cocoon of Destruction
- Postman Pat: The Movie
- Rio 2
- Scooby-Doo! Frankencreepy
- Scooby-Doo! WrestleMania Mystery
- Song of the Sea
- Stand by Me Doraemon
- The Swan Princess: A Royal Family Tale
- Tom and Jerry: The Lost Dragon
- Winx Club: The Mystery of the Abyss

=== 2015 ===
- Alibaba and the Thief
- Alpha and Omega 5: Family Vacation
- Barbie & Her Sisters in The Great Puppy Adventure
- Barbie in Princess Power
- Barbie in Rock 'N Royals
- Blinky Bill the Movie
- Brave Rabbit 2 Crazy Circus
- Capture the Flag
- Doraemon: Nobita's Space Heroes
- The Flintstones & WWE: Stone Age SmackDown!
- The Good Dinosaur
- Goosebumps
- Home
- Hotel Transylvania 2
- Inside Out
- The Invincible Piglet
- Lego DC Comics Super Heroes: Justice League – Attack of the Legion of Doom
- Lego DC Comics Super Heroes: Justice League vs. Bizarro League
- The Little Prince
- Looney Tunes: Rabbits Run
- Maya the Bee
- Minions
- My Little Pony: Equestria Girls – Friendship Games
- Ooops! Noah Is Gone...
- Open Season: Scared Silly
- The Peanuts Movie
- Pokémon the Movie: Hoopa and the Clash of Ages
- Pororo: Cyberspace Adventure
- Scooby-Doo! and Kiss: Rock and Roll Mystery
- Scooby-Doo! Moon Monster Madness
- Shaun the Sheep Movie
- Snowtime!
- The SpongeBob Movie: Sponge Out of Water
- Strange Magic
- Thomas & Friends: Sodor's Legend of the Lost Treasure
- Tinker Bell and the Legend of the NeverBeast
- Tom and Jerry: Spy Quest
- Top Cat Begins

=== 2016 ===
- Alpha and Omega: Dino Digs
- Alpha and Omega: The Big Fureeze
- The Angry Birds Movie
- Barbie: Spy Squad
- Barbie: Star Light Adventure
- Barbie & Her Sisters in A Puppy Chase
- DC Super Hero Girls: Hero of the Year
- Doraemon: Nobita and the Birth of Japan 2016
- El Americano: The Movie
- Finding Dory
- Ice Age: Collision Course
- Kubo and the Two Strings
- Kung Fu Panda 3
- The Land Before Time XIV: Journey of the Brave
- Lego DC Comics Super Heroes: Justice League – Cosmic Clash
- Lego DC Comics Super Heroes: Justice League – Gotham City Breakout
- Lego Scooby-Doo! Haunted Hollywood
- Moana
- My Little Pony: Equestria Girls – Legend of Everfree
- Norm of the North
- Pokémon the Movie: Volcanion and the Mechanical Marvel
- Ratchet & Clank
- Robinson Crusoe
- Rock Dog
- Scooby-Doo! and WWE: Curse of the Speed Demon
- The Secret Life of Pets
- Sheep and Wolves
- Sing
- Spark
- Storks
- Tom and Jerry: Back to Oz
- Trolls
- Zootopia

=== 2017 ===
- Alpha and Omega: Journey to Bear Kingdom
- Animal Crackers
- Barbie: Video Game Hero
- Barbie: Dolphin Magic
- The Boss Baby
- Bunyan & Babe
- Cars 3
- Captain Underpants: The First Epic Movie
- Coco
- DC Super Hero Girls: Intergalactic Games
- Despicable Me 3
- Doraemon the Movie 2017: Great Adventure in the Antarctic Kachi Kochi
- The Emoji Movie
- Ferdinand
- Gnome Alone
- Hey Arnold!: The Jungle Movie
- The Jetsons & WWE: Robo-WrestleMania!
- The Lego Batman Movie
- Lego DC Super Hero Girls: Brain Drain
- The Lego Ninjago Movie
- Lego Scooby-Doo! Blowout Beach Bash
- Lu Over the Wall
- Mary and the Witch's Flower
- Monster Trucks
- My Little Pony: The Movie
- The Nut Job 2: Nutty by Nature
- Pokémon the Movie: I Choose You!
- Scooby-Doo! Shaggy's Showdown
- Smurfs: The Lost Village
- The Star
- Surf's Up 2: WaveMania
- Tom and Jerry: Willy Wonka and the Chocolate Factory

=== 2018 ===
- Cattle Hill
- DC Super Hero Girls: Legends of Atlantis
- Doraemon the Movie: Nobita's Treasure Island
- Duck Duck Goose
- Early Man
- The Grinch
- The Haunted House: The Secret of the Cave
- Hotel Transylvania 3: Summer Vacation
- Incredibles 2
- Lego DC Comics Super Heroes: Aquaman – Rage of Atlantis
- Lego DC Comics Super Heroes: The Flash
- Lego DC Super Hero Girls: Super-Villain High
- Luis and the Aliens
- Maya the Bee: The Honey Games
- Pokémon the Movie: The Power of Us
- Ralph Breaks the Internet
- Scooby-Doo! & Batman: The Brave and the Bold
- Scooby-Doo! and the Gourmet Ghost
- Sherlock Gnomes
- Smallfoot
- Spider-Man: Into the Spider-Verse
- Teen Titans Go! To the Movies
- Wheely

=== 2019 ===
- A Shaun the Sheep Movie: Farmageddon
- Abominable
- The Angry Birds Movie 2
- Arctic Dogs
- Boonie Bears: Blast Into the Past
- Brave Rabbit 3: The Crazy Time Machine
- Crayon Shin-chan: Honeymoon Hurricane ~The Lost Hiroshi~
- Curious George: Royal Monkey
- Doraemon: Nobita's Chronicle of the Moon Exploration
- Frozen 2
- GG Bond: Lollipop in Fantasy
- The Haunted House: The Sky Goblin VS Jormungandr
- How to Train Your Dragon: The Hidden World
- Invader Zim: Enter the Florpus
- Klaus
- Lego DC Batman: Family Matters
- The Lego Movie 2: The Second Part
- The Lion King
- Missing Link
- My Little Pony: Rainbow Roadtrip
- Playmobil: The Movie
- Pokémon Detective Pikachu
- Scooby-Doo! and the Curse of the 13th Ghost
- Scooby-Doo! Return to Zombie Island
- The Secret Life of Pets 2
- Sheep and Wolves: Pig Deal
- Spies in Disguise
- StarDog and TurboCat
- Steven Universe: The Movie
- Teen Titans Go! vs. Teen Titans
- Toy Story 4
- UglyDolls
- Wonder Park

== 2020s ==
=== 2020 ===
- 100% Wolf
- Barbie: Princess Adventure
- Christmas at Cattle Hill
- Curious George: Go West, Go Wild
- The Croods: A New Age
- Doraemon: Nobita's New Dinosaur
- Fearless
- Happy Halloween, Scooby-Doo!
- Lego DC Shazam! Magic and Monsters
- Onward
- Over the Moon
- Phineas and Ferb the Movie: Candace Against the Universe
- Pokémon the Movie: Secrets of the Jungle
- Scoob!
- Soul
- The SpongeBob Movie: Sponge on the Run
- Trolls World Tour
- We Bare Bears: The Movie
- The Willoughbys
- Wolfwalkers

=== 2021 ===
- Arlo the Alligator Boy
- Back to the Outback
- Barbie & Chelsea: The Lost Birthday
- Barbie: Big City, Big Dreams
- The Boss Baby: Family Business
- Diary of a Wimpy Kid
- Encanto
- Extinct
- Hilda and the Mountain King
- Jungle Beat: The Movie
- The Loud House Movie
- Luca
- Marcel the Shell with Shoes On
- Maya the Bee: The Golden Orb
- Mickey and Minnie Wish Upon a Christmas
- Mickey's Tale of Two Witches
- The Mitchells vs. the Machines
- My Little Pony: A New Generation
- Paw Patrol: The Movie
- Raya and the Last Dragon
- Rock Dog 2: Rock Around the Park
- Ron's Gone Wrong
- Rumble
- Scooby-Doo! The Sword and the Scoob
- Seal Team
- Secret Magic Control Agency
- Sing 2
- Space Jam: A New Legacy
- Spirit Untamed
- Straight Outta Nowhere: Scooby-Doo! Meets Courage the Cowardly Dog
- Vivo
- Wish Dragon

=== 2022 ===
- The Amazing Maurice
- The Bad Guys
- Blue's Big City Adventure
- Chickenhare and the Hamster of Darkness
- Chip 'n Dale: Rescue Rangers
- DC League of Super-Pets
- Diary of a Wimpy Kid: Rodrick Rules
- Doraemon: Nobita's Little Star Wars 2021
- Guillermo del Toro's Pinocchio
- The Haunted House: The Dimensional Goblin and the Seven Worlds
- Hotel Transylvania: Transformania
- The Ice Age Adventures of Buck Wild
- King Tweety
- Lightyear
- Luck
- Lyle, Lyle, Crocodile
- Minions: The Rise of Gru
- My Father's Dragon
- Paws of Fury: The Legend of Hank
- Puss in Boots: The Last Wish
- The Sea Beast
- Sonic the Hedgehog 2
- Strange World
- Tom and Jerry: Cowboy Up!
- Tom and Jerry: Snowman's Land
- Trick or Treat Scooby-Doo!
- Turning Red

=== 2023 ===
- A Mystery on the Cattle Hill Express
- Baby Shark's Big Movie!
- Chicken Run: Dawn of the Nugget
- Craig Before the Creek
- Diary of a Wimpy Kid Christmas: Cabin Fever
- Doraemon: Nobita's Sky Utopia
- Elemental
- Katak: The Brave Beluga
- Ladybug & Cat Noir: The Movie
- Leo
- The Magician's Elephant
- Merry Little Batman
- Migration
- Nimona
- Rally Road Racers
- Paw Patrol: The Mighty Movie
- Rock Dog 3: Battle the Beat
- Ruby Gillman, Teenage Kraken
- Scarygirl
- Scooby-Doo! and Krypto, Too!
- Spider-Man: Across the Spider-Verse
- The Super Mario Bros. Movie
- Taz: Quest for Burger
- Teenage Mutant Ninja Turtles: Mutant Mayhem
- Trolls Band Together
- Under the Boardwalk
- Wish

=== 2024 ===
- The Casagrandes Movie
- The Day the Earth Blew Up: A Looney Tunes Movie
- Despicable Me 4
- Doraemon: Nobita's Earth Symphony
- Fox and Hare Save the Forest
- The Garfield Movie
- Harold and the Purple Crayon
- The Haunted House Special: Red Eyed Reaper
- IF
- Inside Out 2
- Kung Fu Panda 4
- Moana 2
- Mufasa: The Lion King
- No Time to Spy: A Loud House Movie
- Orion and the Dark
- Paddington in Peru
- Saving Bikini Bottom: The Sandy Cheeks Movie
- Sonic the Hedgehog 3
- Spellbound
- That Christmas
- Thelma the Unicorn
- The Tiger's Apprentice
- Transformers One
- Wallace & Gromit: Vengeance Most Fowl
- The Wild Robot
- Woody Woodpecker Goes to Camp

=== 2025 ===
- A Minecraft Movie
- Animal Farm
- The Bad Guys 2
- Charlie the Wonderdog
- Chickenhare and the Secret of the Groundhog
- David
- Diary of a Wimpy Kid: The Last Straw
- Dog Man
- Doraemon: Nobita's Art World Tales
- Elio
- Gabby's Dollhouse: The Movie
- Grand Prix of Europe
- In Your Dreams
- The King of Kings
- KPop Demon Hunters
- The Last Whale Singer
- The Lost Tiger
- Plankton: The Movie
- Smurfs
- The SpongeBob Movie: Search for SquarePants
- The Twits
- Zootopia 2

=== 2026 ===
- The Angry Birds Movie 3
- Avatar Aang: The Last Airbender
- Boonie Bears: The Hidden Protector
- The Cat in the Hat
- Coyote vs. Acme
- Diary of a Wimpy Kid: The Getaway
- Doraemon: New Nobita and the Castle of the Undersea Devil
- Forgotten Island
- Goat
- Hexed
- Hoppers
- Minions & Monsters
- Paw Patrol: The Dino Movie
- The Pout-Pout Fish
- The Super Mario Galaxy Movie
- Steps
- Swapped
- Toy Story 5

=== 2027 ===
- A Minecraft Movie Squared
- The Amazing Maurice 2: The Waters of Life
- Bad Fairies
- The Bluey Movie
- Buds
- CoComelon: The Movie
- Doraemon: Nobita's Steam-Powered Time Machine
- Frozen 3
- Gatto
- The Haunting of Hotel Transylvania
- High in the Clouds
- Ice Age: Boiling Point
- Margie Claus
- Not Alone
- Untitled nWave Studios film
- On the Edge
- Shrek 5
- Sonic the Hedgehog 4
- Spider-Man: Beyond the Spider-Verse
- Untitled Teenage Mutant Ninja Turtles: Mutant Mayhem sequel
- Twisted
- Wish Dragon 2

=== 2028 ===
- Clay
- Donkey
- Dougie Dolittle
- Dragoons
- Dreamers – The Hunt for Shadowclaw
- Ghost Market
- Halloween vs Day of the Dead
- Untitled Hello Kitty film
- Incredibles 3
- The Lunar Chronicles
- Masha and the Bear Movie
- Mission Granny
- Oh, the Places You'll Go!
- Pet Robots
- Untitled third Pocoyo film
- Titsou
- Yes, Chef!

=== 2029 ===
- Acorn's Adventure
- Ballerina 2
- Coco 2
- Emmi & Unipig
- Untitled KPop Demon Hunters sequel
- Lucky Luke in Welcome to Fanga Town
- Untitled third Super Mario film

== See also ==
- List of children's animated television series
- List of children's films
