= Alpha and Omega (film series) =

American film series (2010–2017)

- The franchise logo
- Directed by: Benjamin Gluck (1); Anthony Bell (1); Richard Rich (2–5); Tim Maltby (6–8)
- Written by: Christopher Denk (1); Steve Moore (1); Tom Kane (2–8)
- Produced by: Ken Katsumoto; Richard Rich (1–5); Steve Moore (1); Susan Gelb (2–5); Daniel Engelhardt (2–4); Mike Young (6–8); Liz Young (6–8); Steve Rosen (6–8); Andrew Tight (6–8)
- Starring: Justin Long; Hayden Panettiere; Ben Diskin; Kate Higgins Others: Dennis Hopper Bill Lader Danny Glover Maxwell Je Larry Thomas Larry Miller Eric Price Chris Smith Vicki Lewis Tracy Pfau Cindy Robinson Christina Ricci Chris Carmack Blackie Rose Brian Donovan Hugh Tyrrell Kevin Sussman Debi Derryberry Marieve Herington
- Edited by: Joseph L. Campana (1); Louis LA Praix (2–5); Richard Finn (6–8)
- Music by: Chris Bacon (1–5); Noam Kaniel (6–8); Nicholas Varley (6–8)
- Production companies: Crest Animation Productions (2010–16); Splash Entertainment (2016–17)
- Distributed by: Lionsgate Films
- Running time: 403 minutes
- Country: United States
- Language: English

Alpha and Omega is a series of animated films produced by Crest Animation Productions and distributed by Lionsgate Films. The first film was released in 2010 and featured the voices of Justin Long and Hayden Panettiere, though subsequent films were direct-to-video and therefore featured a smaller cast, primarily Ben Diskin and Kate Higgins. All 8 movies were released as an 8 Movie Collection DVD set on October 3, 2017.

== Films ==
=== Alpha and Omega (2010) ===
After park rangers capture and ship them all the way across North America, omega wolf Humphrey (Justin Long) and alpha wolf Kate (Hayden Panettiere) find themselves in the woods very far from home so they must travel far to get home and stop their packs from fighting each other.

=== Alpha and Omega 2: A Howl-iday Adventure (2013) ===
Kate (Kate Higgins), Humphrey (Benjamin Diskin) and their 3 new pups (Stinky, Claudette and Runt) are happily preparing to celebrate their first winter together when their smallest pup, Runt, is kidnapped by rogue wolves, led by a power-hungry wolf named King, as part of a plan to take over their home. Along the way, Kate and Humphrey help a lost bear cub. In gratitude, the bears help the wolves rescue Runt. The wolf family wind up stranded at Max's gas station. However, because of the holidays, Max has a change of heart and allows the wolves to come in and eat.

=== Alpha and Omega 3: The Great Wolf Games (2014) ===
The wolf pups form a team for the Great Wolf Games, something the Western Pack has not had in a long while. They recruit Brent, a bear cub, and his porcupine friend and protector Agnes. Humphrey reluctantly agrees to coach the team. They discover that Nars, the coach of the Northern pack's team, is obsessed with the games, and he's pressuring his son, Fleet, to win at all costs. However, Fleet and Claudette form a bond. The last race ends in a tie, and both Claudette and Fleet insist that they're fine with that result. Nars makes amends with Fleet, and Claudette walks away with Fleet to teach him her tricks.

=== Alpha and Omega 4: The Legend of the Saw Tooth Cave (2014) ===
Lilly takes the Omegas on a field trip to the Shadow Forest, which is reputed to be haunted. Indeed at Saw Tooth Cave, they encounter what appears to be a wolf spirit. But Runt spots a wolf hiding in the cave. Runt overcomes his fear to make contact with the wolf. The wolf, Daria, explains that her mother had to hide her in the cave from her pack because she's blind. The wolf spirit now protects her. With the help of his parents and Daria's porcupine friends, Runt guides Daria back to her pack. However, she learns that the pack leader killed her mom for protecting her, and the pack is still hostile to her. The pack leader attacks Daria again, but the wolf spirit, presumably the ghost of her mother, sweeps the pack leader away. Daria goes to live with the Western pack instead.

=== Alpha and Omega 5: Family Vacation (2015) ===
Humphrey and Kate take the pups to a vacation at Alfred Creek Falls, only to run into two trappers, Griffin and Jethro, trying to make money from relocating wolves. With the help of many friends from the previous movies, the family makes it to the border with Idaho to safety. Throughout the film, the gang reminisce about past adventures, which are shown as clips.

=== Alpha and Omega 6: Dino Digs (2016) ===
65 million years ago, a tyrannosaurus rex chases a raptor named Amy to a "sacred ground", where a mysterious light engulfs them both. In the present, the land is owned by twin brothers Mac and Ian. Mac has developed the land into a resort, and he hires Griffin and Jethro to excavate the dinosaurs' skeletons for a museum. But Amy returns to life the moment light touches her remains. Amy befriends the pups, but warns them that the light could revive the T-Rex as well. The wolf family team up with other animals to try to stop the diggers, but the diggers still unearth the remains and the t-rex comes back to life, devastating Mac's resort. Amy subdues the t-rex using a fountain Mac built, which has a hypnotic effect on both birds and dinosaurs. The light reappears and Amy and the t-rex use it to return to their own time. Ian restores the land to its original state.

=== Alpha and Omega 7: The Big Fureeze (2016) ===
A harsh winter makes food scarce; Kate and Humphrey set out to find a missing herd of caribou. But a winter storm traps them in a cave belonging to hibernating bears. The pups, along with Brent and Agnes, go off to rescue their parents. But they are pursued by King and his new pack of wolves. Kate and Humphrey escape the now angered bears and reunite with their pups. Marcel and Paddy help the wolves defeat King's pack. The wolves locate the caribou herd and herd them back to their cave, where they have a holiday celebration.

=== Alpha and Omega 8: Journey to Bear Kingdom (2017) ===
Queen Bear and Princess Canue come to visit the forest, and it's up to Kate, Humphrey, and the pups to protect them from a devious effort to take over their kingdom by two rival bears, Strom and Claw, that have teamed up with the Rogue Pack led by King Rogue and attempt to overthrow King Bear and the royal bear family. However, they are eventually defeated by the bears and the wolves working together to fend off the rogue pack and the traitorous bears.

== Reception ==
=== Critical reception ===
Film	Rotten Tomatoes	Metacritic
Alpha and Omega	20% (58 reviews)	36 (15 reviews)
Alpha and Omega 2: A Howl-iday Adventure	—N/a	—N/a
Alpha and Omega 3: The Great Wolf Games	—N/a	—N/a
Alpha and Omega 4: The Legend of the Saw Tooth Cave	—N/a	—N/a
Alpha and Omega 5: Family Vacation	—N/a	—N/a
Alpha and Omega 6: Dino Digs	—N/a	—N/a
Alpha and Omega 7: The Big Fureeze	—N/a	—N/a
Alpha and Omega 8: Journey to Bear Kingdom	—N/a	—N/a

=== Box office performance ===
Film	Release date	Revenue			Budget	Ref.
Film	Release date	U.S. and Canada	Other territories	Worldwide	Budget	Ref.
Alpha and Omega	September 17, 2010	$25,107,267	$25,400,000	$50,507,267	$20,000,000	
Alpha and Omega 2: A Howl-iday Adventure	October 8, 2013	—N/a	—N/a	—N/a	—N/a	—
Alpha and Omega 3: The Great Wolf Games	March 25, 2014	—N/a	—N/a	—N/a	—N/a	
Alpha and Omega 4: The Legend of the Saw Tooth Cave	October 7, 2014	—N/a	—N/a	—N/a	—N/a	
Alpha and Omega 5: Family Vacation	August 4, 2015	—N/a	—N/a	—N/a	—N/a	
Alpha and Omega 6: Dino Digs	May 10, 2016	—N/a	—N/a	—N/a	—N/a	
Alpha and Omega 7: The Big Fureeze	November 8, 2016	—N/a	—N/a	—N/a	—N/a	
Alpha and Omega 8: Journey to Bear Kingdom	May 9, 2017	—N/a	—N/a	—N/a	—N/a	
Total		$25,107,267	$25,400,000	$50,507,267	$20,000,000	

== Characters ==
Character	Films							
Character	Alpha and Omega	A Howl-iday Adventure	The Great Wolf Games	The Legend of the Saw Tooth Cave	Family Vacation	Dino Digs	The Big Fureeze	Journey to Bear Kingdom
Character	2010	2013	2014		2015	2016		2017
Humphrey	Justin Long	Ben Diskin	Ben Diskin	Ben Diskin	Ben Diskin	Ben Diskin	Ben Diskin	Ben Diskin
Kate	Hayden Panettiere	Kate Higgins	Kate Higgins	Kate Higgins	Kate Higgins	Kate Higgins	Kate Higgins	Kate Higgins
Tony	Dennis Hopper	Bill Lader		Bill Lader				
Winston	Danny Glover	Maxwell Je		Larry Thomas			Larry Thomas	Larry Thomas
Marcel	Larry Miller	Chris Smith	Chris Smith	Chris Smith	Chris Smith	Chris Smith	Chris Smith	Chris Smith
Paddy	Eric Price	Chris Smith	Chris Smith	Chris Smith	Chris Smith	Chris Smith	Chris Smith	Chris Smith
Eve	Vicki Lewis	Tracy Pfau		Cindy Robinson			Cindy Robinson	Cindy Robinson
Lilly	Christina Ricci	Kate Higgins		Kate Higgins	Kate Higgins			
Garth	Chris Carmack	Blackie Rose			Chris Collins			
Salty	Brian Donovan	Brian Donovan			Hugh Tyrrell			
Shakey	Kevin Sussman				Chris Smith			
Mooch	Eric Price		Chris Smith		Chris Smith			
Runt		Debi Derryberry (as Liza West, Dee Dee Green, Hunter Swan and Sue Swan)						
Stinky		Kate Higgins	Kate Higgins	Kate Higgins	Kate Higgins	Kate Higgins	Kate Higgins	Kate Higgins
Claudette		Marieve Herington (as Lindsay Torrance)	Marieve Herington (as Lindsay Torrance)	Marieve Herington (as Lindsay Torrance)	Marieve Herington (as Lindsay Torrance)	Marieve Herington (as Lindsay Torrance)	Marieve Herington (as Lindsay Torrance)	Marieve Herington (as Lindsay Torrance)
Agnes			Mela Lee		Mela Lee		Mela Lee	Mela Lee
Brent			Mike Jacobs		Mike Jacobs		Mike Jacobs	Richard Gordon
Fleet			Mike Jacobs		Mike Jacobs			Richard Gordon
Freida				Gina Bowes	Gina Bowes			Gina Bowes
Fran				Gina Bowes	Gina Bowes			Gina Bowes
Daria				Gina Bowes	Gina Bowes			
Amy						Erin Fitzgerald		
Princess		Meryl Leigh						
King		Blackie Rose					Blackie Rose	
Princess Canue								Gina Bowes
Magpie								Gina Bowes
Queen Bear								Erin Fitzgerald
King Bear								Chris Smith
King Rogue Wolf								Josh Tomar
Strom								Josh Tomar
Claw								Chris Smith
Beast								Xander Mobus
Louis								Chris Smith
Donna						Michelle Souza		Michelle Souza
Marge						Cindy Robinson		Cindy Robinson

Note: A light grey cell indicates the character who did not appear in that film.
