= Fagerborg Upper Secondary School =

Coordinates: 59°56′01″N 10°43′49″E

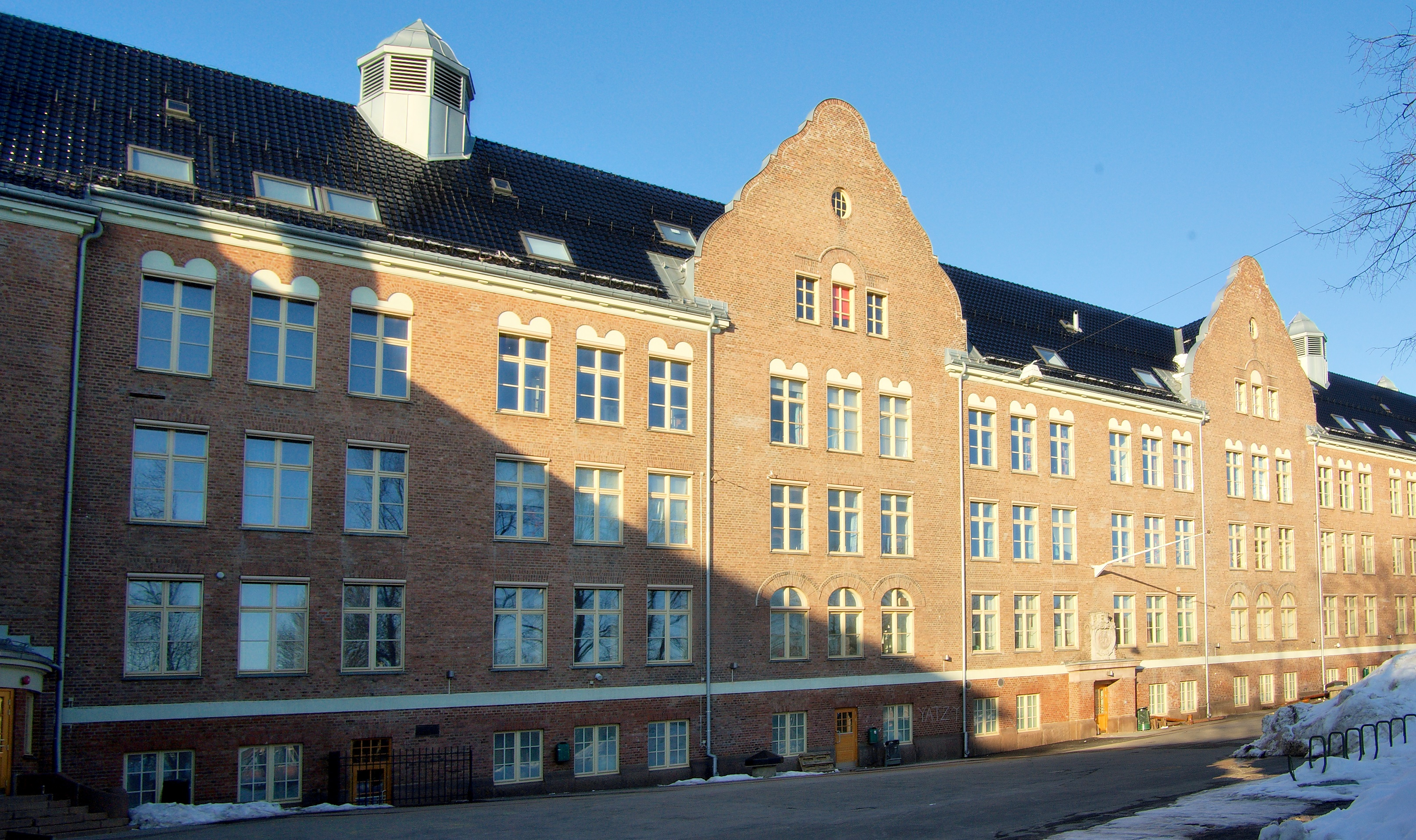
- Building
- Pilestredet 109 Oslo, Norway

Information
- Type: Secondary School
- Established: 1915
- Closed: 2014

Fagerborg Upper Secondary School (Norwegian: Fagerborg videregående skole) was an upper secondary school near Majorstuen in Oslo, Norway in the borough of St. Hanshaugen. In addition to a university preparatory track, it had a track specializing in dancing and ballet. The upper secondary school was closed in 2014 after 99 years, and most programs and employees moved to the new Blindern Upper Secondary School. Since 2015 the buildings have housed a new public middle school named Fagerborg skole.

== Notable alumni ==
- Gudmund Harlem
- Henrik Holm
- Aksel Hennie
- Jan Erik Vold
- Anne-Kat. Hærland
- Sigrid Bonde Tusvik
- André Bjerke
- Carsten Byhring
- Henki Kolstad
- Rolf Jacobsen
- Sigrid Bonde Tusvik
- Christian Valeur
