= Alpha and Omega (film) =

2010 American animated romantic adventure comedy film

- Theatrical release poster
- Directed by: Anthony Bell; Ben Gluck
- Screenplay by: Christopher Denk; Steve Moore
- Story by: Steve Moore; Ben Gluck
- Produced by: Richard Rich; Ken Katsumoto; Steve Moore
- Starring: Justin Long; Hayden Panettiere; Dennis Hopper; Danny Glover; Christina Ricci
- Edited by: Joseph L. Campana
- Music by: Chris Bacon
- Production companies: Lionsgate Films; Crest Animation
- Distributed by: Lionsgate Films
- Release dates: September 8, 2010 (TIFF); September 17, 2010 (United States)
- Running time: 88 minutes
- Country: United States
- Language: English
- Budget: $20 million
- Box office: $50.5 million

Alpha and Omega is a 2010 American animated romantic adventure comedy film directed by Anthony Bell and Ben Gluck. Starring the voices of Justin Long, Hayden Panettiere, Dennis Hopper, Danny Glover and Christina Ricci, the film was written by Christopher Denk and Steve Moore, based on a story by Moore and Gluck. The film sets around two young Rocky Mountain wolves named Kate (Panettiere) and Humphrey (Long) who fall in love with each other, but are on the opposite ends of their pack. However, when Kate and Humphrey learn that they got relocated to Idaho for repopulation, they must work together to get back to Jasper National Park before a war slowly begins to emerge between both packs.

The film premiered at the Toronto International Film Festival on September 8, 2010, and was released nationwide in 2-D and 3-D on September 17, 2010, by Lionsgate. Alpha and Omega was a box-office success, grossing $50.5 million against a budget of $20 million, but received generally negative reviews from critics. The film was dedicated to Hopper, as he died four months before it was released.

The film eventually turned into a franchise of 7 direct-to-video sequels including Alpha and Omega 2: A Howl-iday Adventure, which was released on October 8, 2013. Another sequel, The Great Wolf Games, was released on March 25, 2014. The Legend of the Saw Tooth Cave was released on September 23, 2014. Family Vacation was released to DVD on August 4, 2015. Dino Digs was released on DVD and Digital HD on May 10, 2016. It was followed by The Big Fur-eeze, which was released on November 8, 2016. The final installment, Journey to Bear Kingdom, was released on DVD and Digital HD on May 9, 2017.

== Plot ==
In Alberta, Canada's Jasper National Park, Omega wolf Humphrey has a crush on his friend, Alpha wolf Kate. As Kate leaves for Alpha school, Winston, Kate's father and leader of the Western Pack, is conscious of their friendship and reminds Humphrey that Alphas and Omegas cannot marry, according to the pack law.

Spring time comes around, and both Kate and Humphrey mature. Humphrey and his friends see Kate on her first hunt, pursuing a herd of caribou. As Kate and her team close in on the caribou, they are interrupted by two enemy Eastern pack wolves, which causes a stampede. As Kate saves the two Eastern wolves from getting trampled, the Western pack wolves start a scuffle. Humphrey and his friends break up the conflict.

Winston meets with Eastern pack leader Tony to discuss the pack's food shortage. They agree that merging the packs together would end their conflict. They decide that Kate should marry Tony's Alpha son, Garth, to unite the packs, and meet tonight at the Moonlight Howl. Kate, overhearing their conversation, begrudgingly agrees for the good of the pack.

During the Moonlight Howl, Garth reveals he is bad at howling, and an unimpressed Kate politely excuses herself. She runs into Humphrey, but the two get tranquilized by park rangers and are taken to Sawtooth National Recreation Area in Idaho. They meet golfing goose Marcel, and his duck caddie Paddy. Kate and Humphrey learn that they were relocated to repopulate the species, and agree that they must return home to Jasper Park, sneaking in a RV.

Tony warns Winston that if Kate does not return by the full moon, war will be inevitable. Lilly, Kate's younger Omega sister, decides to show Garth around the Western pack's territory until Kate returns, and they begin to bond. Meanwhile, after saving Humphrey from two men that believe he has rabies after he eats a cupcake, Kate comes across a ravine, but is unable to cross it, and Humphrey comes to her rescue. Flattered by his bravery, Kate begins to admire Humphrey. The following day, Marcel and Paddy find the wolves and direct them to a train heading to Jasper Park. Climbing over the snowy mountain, Humphrey finds a grizzly bear cub, and plays with it, but throws some snow a little too hard at the cub, and it begins to cry, attracting an angry trio of grizzly bears, and he and Kate escape, boarding the train just in time.

Breaking pack law, Lilly compassionately teaches Garth how to howl. At the same time, Humphrey and Kate passionately howl together under the full moon and their bond grows stronger. Meanwhile, Tony catches Garth and Lilly, and ultimately declares war on the Western pack. As the train passes by Jasper, Kate and Humphrey's exchange of feelings is cut short by the sight of the two packs at war. Kate announces that she will marry Garth to unite the packs, much to Humphrey's dismay. The day of the wedding, a sad Humphrey bids farewell to Kate and leaves as a lone wolf.

During the ceremony, Kate backs out and declares her love for Humphrey, as Garth subsequently declares his love for Lilly, much for Tony's anger. A fight breaks out, which frightens a nearby herd of caribou and causes a stampede. Winston and Tony struggle to outrun the herd. Humphrey and Kate cross paths, and work together to save them, but Kate gets struck by the caribou and is knocked unconscious. As the stampede subsides, Kate awakens, and she and Humphrey confess their love for each other, as Garth and Lilly confess theirs.

Winston and Tony abolish the law against marriage between Alphas and Omegas, and accept a union of the two packs via marriage between Garth and Lilly. At the Moonlight Howl, the wolves celebrate the love of Kate and Humphrey, and Garth and Lilly, breaking the social classes and traditions. Humphrey and Kate howl a duet.

== Voice cast ==
- Justin Long as Humphrey, a fun-loving, playful Omega wolf from the Western Pack who is in love with Kate.
- Hayden Panettiere as Kate, a fearless, independent Alpha wolf from the Western Pack who is destined to marry Garth to unite the packs, and later falls in love with Humphrey. Sister to Lilly, and Winston and Eve's daughter.
- Dennis Hopper as Tony, the polite but villainous leader of the Eastern pack and Garth's father.
- Danny Glover as Winston, the wise leader of the Western pack, Kate and Lilly's father and mate to Eve.
- Christina Ricci as Lilly, a shy Omega wolf from the Western pack who becomes infatuated with Garth. Kate's younger sister, and Winston and Eve's daughter.
- Larry Miller as Marcel, a French-Canadian goose who helps Kate and Humphrey get back home.
- Eric Price as Paddy, a British duck and Marcel's caddie.
  - Price also voices Mooch, an overweight Omega wolf from the Western Pack.
- Vicki Lewis as Eve, an aggressive but caring Alpha wolf from the Western Pack. Winston's mate, and Kate and Lilly's mother.
- Chris Carmack as Garth, a strong, handsome Alpha wolf from the Eastern Pack. Tony's son who is destined to marry Kate to unite the packs, later falls in love with Lilly.
- Kevin Sussman as Shakey, a nervous Omega wolf from the Western Pack.
- Brian Donovan as Salty, a keen, laid back Omega wolf from the Western Pack.
- Maya Feltheimer as a bear cub
- Christine Lakin as Reba, an Omega wolf from the Western Pack.
- Marilyn Tokuda as Claws, an Alpha wolf from the Eastern Pack.
  - Tokuda also voices Janice, an Omega from the Western Pack.
- Eric Lopez as Can-do, an Alpha from the Western Pack.
- Paul Nakauchi as Hutch, an Alpha from the Western Pack.
- Bitsie Tulloch as Sweets, an Omega from the Western Pack.
- Mela Lee as Candy, an Omega from the Western Pack.
- Nika Futterman as a porcupine
- Fred Tatasciore as Garn, a former motorcycle gang member, husband to Debbie.
- Mindy Sterling as Debbie, a former librarian, wife to Garn.
- Steve Vinovich as Park Ranger
- Marcelo Tubert as Max, a gas station owner
- Toby Huss as Truck Stop Employee
- Jason Ortenberg as Squirrel #1
- Andrew Ortenberg as Squirrel #2
- Frank Welker as Caribou

== Production ==
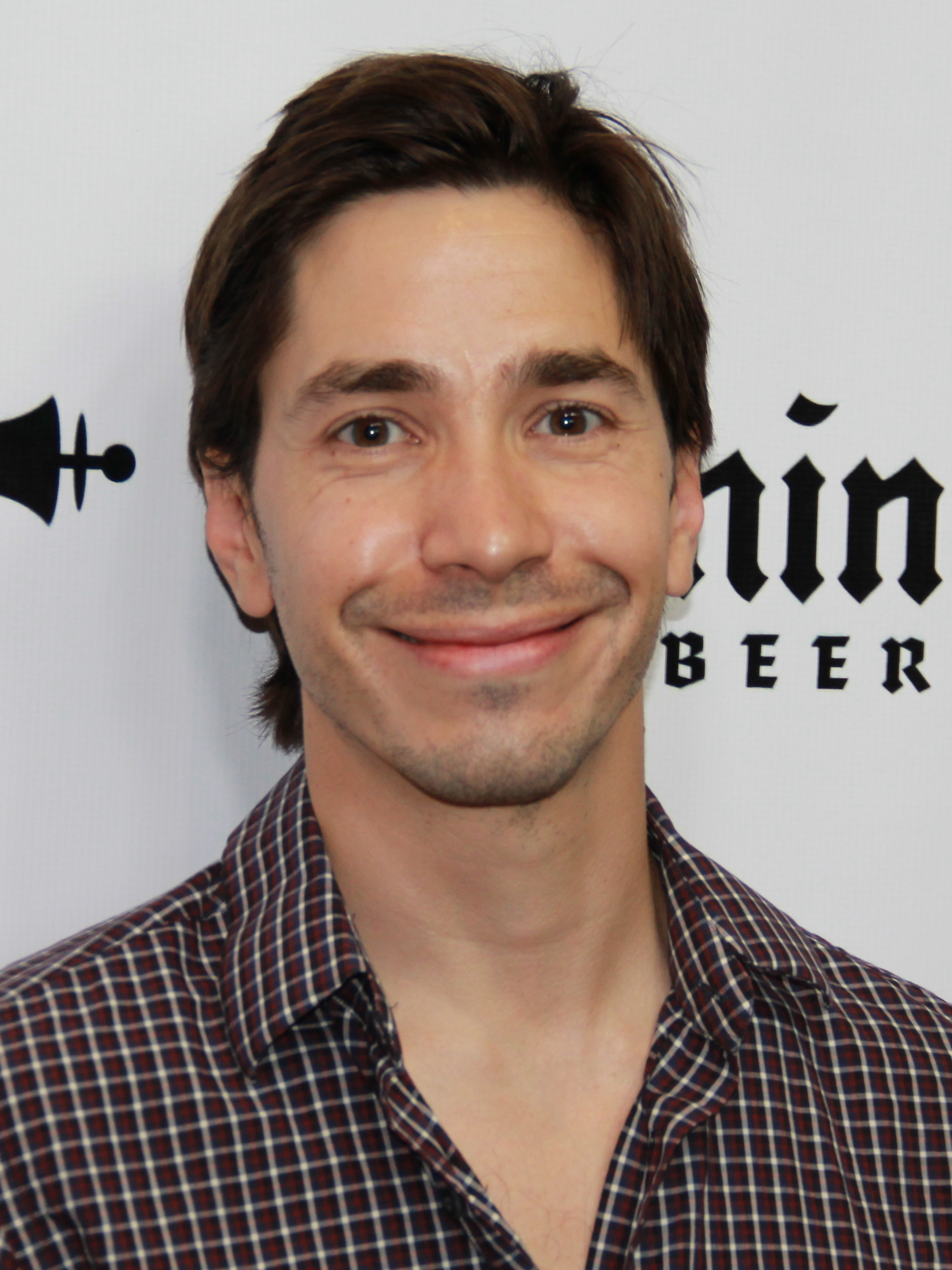
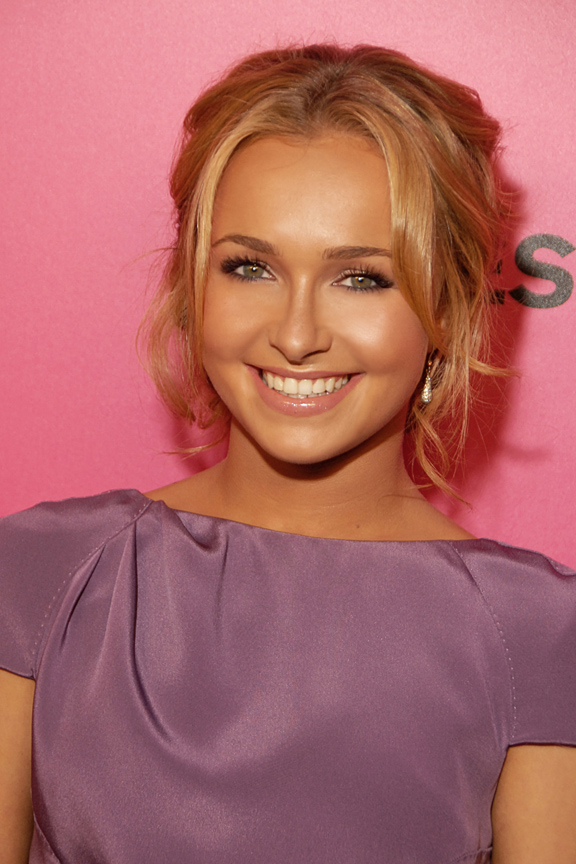
From left to right: Justin Long (pictured in 2014) and Hayden Panettiere (2009), respectively the voices of Humphrey and Kate

Lionsgate Films and Crest Animation Productions announced the film on April 3, 2008 as the first film in a multi-picture partnership between the two parties. Anthony Bell and Ben Gluck would direct the film with the former making his feature directorial debut with the screenplay being written by Steve Moore and Christopher Denk, based on the former's original story with the voice cast being revealed around the same time. Lionsgate would distribute in the US and the UK while Mandate International, the international sales arm of Mandate Pictures would handle international sales, outside of India.

Pre-production and post-production took place in Los Angeles, with key animation produced by Crest Animation Productions in India. The script was written in Toronto, Ontario, Canada.

== Reception ==
Alpha and Omega took in $2,288,773 on its opening day, and $9,106,906 on its opening weekend domestically, reaching fifth place at the box office. The film ended its run on December 2, 2010 after grossing $25 million domestically and $25 million in other territories. It stands as Lionsgate's highest-grossing original animated film domestically, with eight follow-up sequels.

Alpha and Omega holds an approval rating of 20% on Rotten Tomatoes based on 57 reviews; the site's consensus is: "With bland visuals and a dull, predictable plot, Alpha and Omega is a runt in 2010's animated litter." At Metacritic, the film has a score of 36 out of 100 based on reviews from 15 critics, indicating "generally unfavorable" reviews. Andrew Barker of Variety gave the film a mixed review, writing: "Not without charm, Lionsgate's 3D animated pic is agreeably unambitious." Sheri Linden of The Hollywood Reporter wrote: "Abounding in dumb jokes that kids are bound to like but sometimes too scary for very young viewers, the movie -- also going out in 2D -- takes too long to find its footing and at best is proficient, not exhilarating."

Bernie Van De Yacht was nominated for an Artios Award for Outstanding Achievement in Casting.

== Marketing ==
=== Books ===
Three books on Alpha and Omega have been published by Finbar and Mindy:

1. Kate and Humphrey's Big Adventure/All about Wolves by Rebecca McCarthy
2. Alpha and Omega: Marcel and Paddy Save the Day by Tori Kosara
3. Alpha and Omega: The Junior Novel by Aaron S. Rosenberg

=== Video games ===
Developed by Sparkworkz and published by Storm City Games in the United States and Funbox Media in Europe and Australia, a video game adaptation called Alpha and Omega, based on the first film in the franchise of the same name, was exclusively released for the Nintendo DS on September 14, 2010 and was available in North America, Europe and Australia, although certain copies have been imported in other countries. The game features four mini-games based on the movie - log boarding, an endless runner, a howling rhythm game, and golfing with touch screen controls. It was panned for its poor graphics, bad controls, and repetitive mini-games.

Alpha and Omega: Alpha Run was a mobile game published by inXile Entertainment, released for iPhone and iPod Touch on September 16, 2010. The game is similar to the Nintendo DS game's "Alpha Run" stages.

=== Toys ===
McDonald's released a line of eight toys for the film's release in the United Kingdom.

== Release ==
=== Home media ===
Alpha and Omega was released on DVD and Blu-ray Disc on January 11, 2011 by Lionsgate Home Entertainment, which included a coupon for Great Wolf Resorts.

== Sequels ==
A number of direct-to-video sequels to Alpha and Omega have been produced with none of the original cast reprising their roles (with the exception of Brian Donovan as Salty in Alpha and Omega 2: A Howl-iday Adventure). Justin Long is replaced by Benjamin Diskin as Humphrey and Hayden Panettiere and Christina Ricci are replaced by Kate Higgins as both Kate and Lilly.

The first sequel, Alpha and Omega 2: A Howl-iday Adventure, was released on October 8, 2013. The film revolves around the disappearance of Runt, one of Kate and Humphrey's pups in the sequel. DVD Talk stated that Alpha and Omega 2 was "so thin and uninteresting, and so lacking in holiday spirit, that you're not going to be pulling this one out each year when the holidays roll around" and that the film's price combined with its film length made other film choices "even more attractive." Common Sense Media gave the film a 1 out of 5 stars and wrote that the "Faux holiday-themed sequel is weak and forgettable."

Alpha and Omega 3: The Great Wolf Games, based on the Winter Olympics and directed by Richard Rich, was released on iTunes on March 4, 2014, and it was later released on March 25, 2014 as a Walmart Exclusive. Common Sense Media gave Alpha and Omega 3 a mixed review, with three out of five stars, writing that the "mildly amusing sports-themed sequel is fun for young kids." The film was released shortly after the 2014 Winter Olympics in Sochi, Russia, on which it is based.

Alpha and Omega: The Legend of the Saw Tooth Cave was produced by Crest Animation Productions and distributed by Lionsgate Films. Written by Tom Kane and directed by Richard Rich, it is the fourth film in the franchise. The film was released to iTunes on September 23, 2014 and was released to DVD on October 7, 2014. The plot involves Runt exploring the Saw Tooth Cave and finding a wolf who has been driven from her pack for being different. He must help her and he learns about the joys of lending a paw to a friend in need. The trailer for Alpha and Omega: The Legend of the Saw Tooth Cave was released on July 21, 2014. The film was officially announced in the DVD features of Alpha and Omega 2: A Howl-iday Adventure, along with The Great Wolf Games, with director Richard Rich showing two short clips from the storyboards of both films. Common Sense Media gave the film 3 out of 5, stating "Entertaining wolf sequel has peril and some scares".

The fifth film in the franchise, Alpha and Omega: Family Vacation, aired on TV in Mexico on March 28 and was released to DVD on August 4, 2015. It is written by Tom Kane and directed by Richard Rich. It aired in Mexico on March 28, 2015 before having its DVD premiere on August 4. The plot involves Kate, Humphrey, and the pups attempting to have a vacation together, but must flee from human wolf trappers in the process, and recaps the events as flashback scenes from past movies including the first film, except for one alteration scene of the first film. Common Sense Media gave the film a rating of 3 out of 5 stars, stating "Adorable wolves take on trappers; some peril, suspense."

On April 8, 2015, three more sequels were announced for Lionsgate to distribute, the first of which was released in early 2016, and followed the "misadventures of Alpha Kate and Omega Humphrey and their three wolf pups, Stinky, Claudette and Runt, as they learn life lessons in the great outdoors".

On October 6, 2015, on Splash Entertainment's website, they have revealed the next sequel titled Alpha and Omega: The Big Fureeze along with sneak preview clips of the film, which was released in 2016. The other two sequel titles have also been revealed as, in order, Alpha and Omega: Dino Digs and Alpha and Omega: Journey to Bear Kingdom.

Alpha and Omega: Dino Digs was released on DVD and Digital HD on May 10, 2016. Alpha and Omega: The Big Fureeze was released on DVD and Digital HD on November 8, 2016. Alpha and Omega: Journey to Bear Kingdom was released on May 9, 2017.
