= A Mystery on the Cattle Hill Express =

2023 Norwegian animated film

- Theatrical release poster
- Norwegian: Et mysterium på storfebakken ekspress)
- Directed by: Will Ashurst
- Written by: Kristian Landmark
- Produced by: Heidi Palm Sandberg
- Music by: Marius Christiansen
- Production companies: Felleskjø; Kristiansand Dyrepark; Qvisten Animation
- Release date: 3 March 2023
- Running time: 70 minutes
- Country: Norway
- Language: Norwegian

A Mystery on the Cattle Hill Express (Norwegian: Et mysterium på storfebakken ekspress, Kutoppen - På sporet) is a 2023 Norwegian animated comedy film directed by Will Ashurst. The film was produced by Heidi Palm Sandberg with Felleskjø, Kristiansand Dyrepark and Qvisten Animation. A sequel to Cattle Hill (2018) and Christmas at Cattle Hill (2020), this mystery film, very loosely inspired by some elements of Agatha Christie's universe, was released in Norway on 3 March 2023 and in the UK on 20 October 2023. It was distributed in the rest of the world by New Europe Film Sales.

== Plot ==
The land where Clara's father, Biff, has his farm has become sterile. Desperate to find a solution, he accepts his neighbour Paulina's invitation on the following day. They meet at Cattle Hill Station in the morning. There, a special Express train run by Albert, a pig friend of Paulina, takes them on a trip during which they are presented a special electronic seed that can solve the problem of fertility of any soil. During dinner on the train, the seed is stolen. Albert calls the famous detective Agatha Chichester and the train picks her up at the following station. Clara's father is soon accused, as he has no alibi and his print is found on the glass of the display case that was containing the seed. But Clara and Gaute soon discover that Albert has been ruining various farms with the long-term effects of the Seed. They share their doubts with Agatha, only to realise that she's the actual robber. She explains that she seeks revenge against Albert, who has ruined her family. During the pursuit, the train derails and she escapes. They all go back to Cattle Hill, where the soil was now given enough rest to become fertile again and they decide happily to work there without any help from new technology.

== Voice cast ==
- Emily Cass as Clara the Cow (English)
- Henriette Marø as Agatha Chichester, the rabbit detective
- Marit Andreassen as Chickolina
- Charlotte Frogner as Pauline
- Mats Eldøen as Gavin
- Fridtjov Såheim as Mosk
- Jan Martin Johnsen as Bærnt
- Jon Øigarden as Albert Einswein, pig friend of Pauline and inventor

== Reception ==
A review in The Guardian stated, "The figures are so shonkily animated, it's not always instantly obvious which animals the characters are meant to be, and the overall look has that over-bright cheapness that makes so much children's television eye-aching to watch. Still there is a surprise ending in homage to Christie that actually isn't half bad, though by this point Cattle Hill may already have lost the audience."

A Norwegian review found that the film "create(d) a detailed and lively film universe based on the reality of Norwegian agriculture." while Dagbladet wrote that the film was "without soul".
