= Cattle Hill =

2018 Norwegian animated film

- Theatrical release poster
- Norwegian: KuToppen
- Directed by: Lise I. Osvoll
- Written by: Anne Elvedal (script)
- Produced by: Ingvild Evjemo
- Edited by: Arnt Egil Andreassen
- Music by: Gaute Storaa
- Production companies: Qvisten Animation; The Lipp; Vigmostad & Bjørke
- Distributed by: Nordisk Film Distribusjon
- Release date: 19 October 2018
- Running time: 66 minutes
- Country: Norway
- Languages: Norwegian; English
- Box office: $1,330,576

Cattle Hill (Norwegian: KuToppen) is a 2018 Norwegian animated comedy film directed by Lise I. Osvoll from a script by Anne Elvedal. Produced by Qvisten Animation in co-production with The Lipp and Vigmostad & Bjørke, the film is based on the titular attraction in Kristiansand Zoo and Amusement Park in Norway. It was released in Norway on 19 October 2018 and in the UK on 22 November 2019, and had a worldwide gross of $1,330,576.

== Premise ==
The young calf Klara dreams of becoming a famous musician. One day, she is invited to visit her father Mosk the ox at his farm, whom she has not seen for many years, believing that he is a big rock star. However, when she arrives, she finds out that he is actually a financially troubled farmer who is about to lose his farm.

== Voice cast ==
- Henriette Faye-Schjøll as Kalven Klara
- Sigrid Bonde Tusvik as Kari, Klara's mother
- Fridtjov Såheim as Mosk, Klara's father
- Bjarte Tjøstheim as Fugleskremselet Fobetron
- Mats Eldøen as Guttegeiten Gaute
- Marit A. Andreassen as Høna Chickolina
- Oda Osvoll Avatsmark as Meitemarken Rosa
- Jan Martin Johnsen as Sauen Bærnt
- Charlotte Frogner as Grisen Pauline
- Unge Ferrari as Zebra twin 1
- Arif as Zebra twin 2

== Release ==
The film was released in Norway on 19 October 2018, where it grossed $1,137,978. It was released in the UK on 22 November 2019 and grossed $8,366, adding to a worldwide total of $1,330,576.

The film received a nomination for the Amanda Award for Best Children's Film in 2019.

== Sequels ==
A sequel, titled Christmas at Cattle Hill (Jul på KuToppen) was released on 6 November 2020.

Another sequel, titled A Mystery on the Cattle Hill Express (Et mysterium på storfebakken ekspress) was released on 3 March 2023.

== See also ==
- List of Norwegian films of the 2010s
