= Benjamin Diskin =

American actor

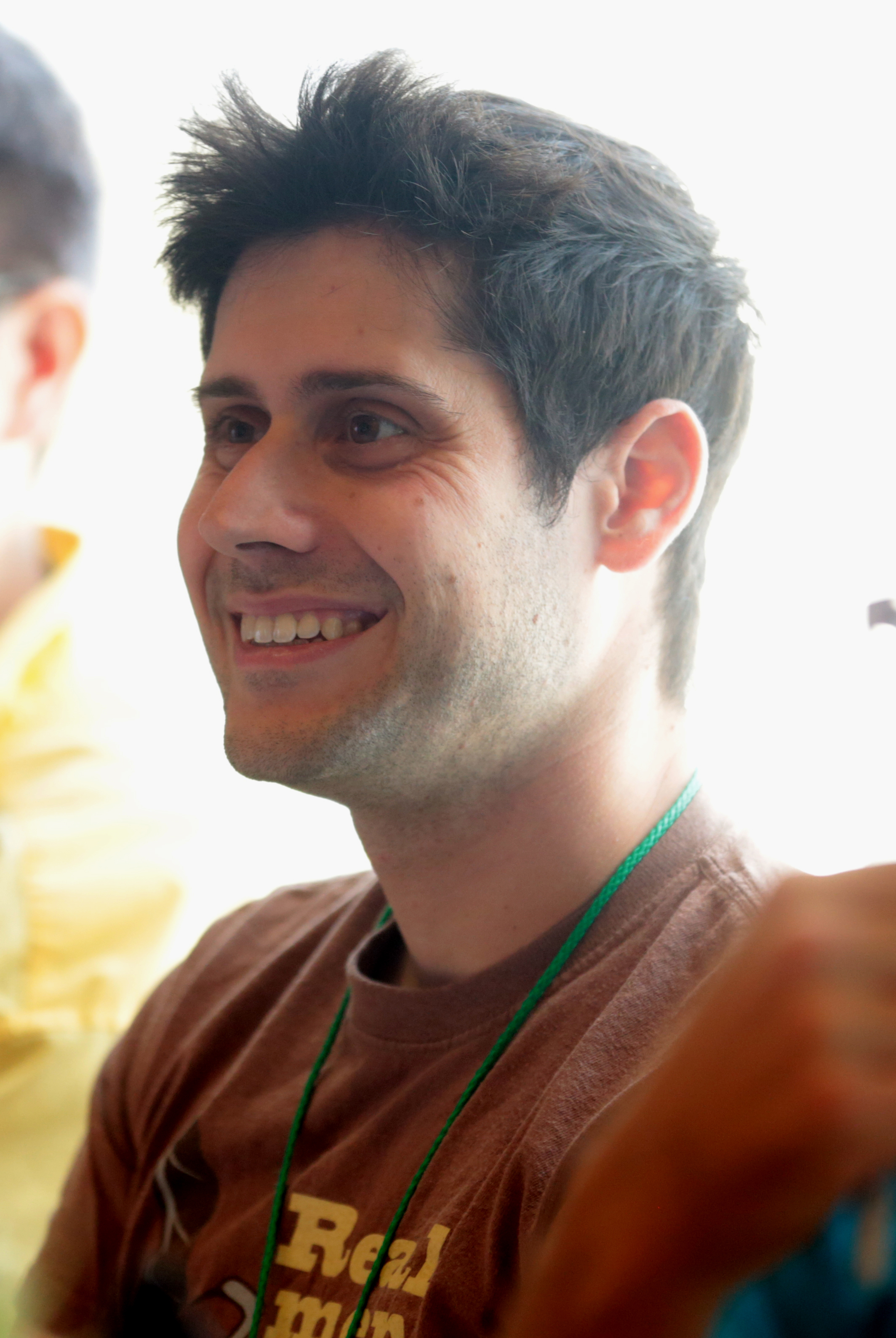
- Diskin in 2017
- Occupation: Actor
- Years active: 1987–present
- Agent: CESD

Benjamin Diskin is an American actor best known for his work in animation, anime, and video games. Over a career spanning more than three decades, he has voiced a multitude of characters.

== Career ==
In 1991, Diskin won the "Outstanding Young Ensemble Cast in a Motion Picture" Young Artist Award for his role of Sylvester in Kindergarten Cop.

In 1993, Diskin provided the voice of Junior Healy in the USA Network animated series Problem Child. He would later voice characters in animation, such as Eugene in Hey Arnold!, Numbuh 1 and Numbuh 2 in Codename: Kids Next Door, Eddie Brock and Venom in The Spectacular Spider-Man, Hahn in Avatar: The Last Airbender, and Ma'alefa'ak in Young Justice. From 2018 to 2022, Diskin voiced Gonzo and Rizzo in the revival series of Muppet Babies, for which he won the "Outstanding Performer in a Preschool Animated Program" Daytime Emmy Award in 2019.

In anime, notable roles he played include Arashi Fuuma and Sai in Naruto and Naruto: Shippuden respectively, Kai Miyagusuku and Katao in Blood+, Shoutmon and Cutemon in Digimon Fusion, Joseph Joestar in JoJo's Bizarre Adventure, Gurio Umino in the Viz Media dub of Sailor Moon, Kensuke Aida in Neon Genesis Evangelion, Death Gun in Sword Art Online, Ban in The Seven Deadly Sins, Satoru Fujinuma in Erased, Knuckle Bine in Hunter x Hunter, and Jack in Beastars. He voiced the Disney character Stitch in the English versions of Stitch! and Stitch & Ai, taking over from the character's creator and original voice actor Chris Sanders. In 2018, he voiced Haida in the English dub of the Netflix original series Aggretsuko.

In video games, he voiced Eric Sparrow in Tony Hawk's Underground and its direct sequel Tony Hawk's Underground 2, young Xehanort in the Kingdom Hearts series, Jared Miller in Halo 4, Jusis Albarea in The Legend of Heroes: Trails of Cold Steel series, Mega Man in Mega Man 11, and Lorenz Gloucester and Caspar von Bergliez in Fire Emblem: Three Houses. In 2018, he voiced Victor in Mr. Love Queen's choice. He also voiced Khajiit Captain Za'ji in Elder Scrolls Online.

Diskin has also appeared as an actor in The Wonder Years, Mr. Saturday Night, Baby Boom and Just Like Dad.

In July 2019, Diskin was one of the guests of honor at the annual Anthrocon furry convention in Pittsburgh.

On March 10, 2026, Diskin posted on his Bluesky account that he would not be continuing his work as the voice of Mega Man upon learning that Capcom declared that the upcoming game Mega Man: Dual Override would be a non-union project; Diskin cited concerns over AI protection as his decision for leaving the role; consequently, SAG-AFTRA issued a "Do Not Work" order to all members in regards to the game.

== Personal life ==
Diskin is Jewish.

== Filmography ==
=== Anime and Asian animation ===
List of voice performances in anime and Asian animation
Year	Series	Role	Notes	Source
2007–2008	Blood+	Kai Miyagusuku		
2009–2011, 2013	Bleach	Szayelaporro Granz, Abirama Redder		
2009–2016	Stitch!	Stitch, Experiment 627, Zero		
2010–2019	Naruto Shippuden	Sai, others		
2013–2015	Digimon Fusion	Shoutmon, Cutemon		
2014	K	Misaki Yata		
2014	Blood Lad	Wolf		
2014–2015	Kill la Kill	Kaneo Takarada, Takaharu Fukuroda (Ep. 1)		
2014–2018	Sailor Moon	Gurio Umino	Viz Media dub	
2015	Sword Art Online II	Death Gun, Ginrou		
2015	Aldnoah.Zero	John Humeray		
2015	Mobile Suit Gundam: The Origin	Char Aznable		
2015	JoJo's Bizarre Adventure	Joseph Joestar	Battle Tendency	
2015–2017	Sailor Moon Crystal	Gurio Umino		
2015–2021	The Seven Deadly Sins	Ban		
2016	One-Punch Man	Super Custom YO649Z Mk. II, Ground Dragon	Eps. 1–2	
2016–2017	Erased	Satoru Fujinuma		
2016–2019	Bungo Stray Dogs	Michizō Tachihara	Seasons 1–3 only	
2017	Stitch & Ai	Stitch	English-language Chinese animated series; English version released in 2018	
2017	Blue Exorcist	Kinzo Shima		
2017	Little Witch Academia	Frank, Additional voices	4 episodes	
2017	Glitter Force: Doki Doki	Ira		
2017	Mob Psycho 100	Miyagawa		
2017	Occultic;Nine	Kouhei Izumi		
2018	B: the Beginning	Kamui		
2018	Katsugeki/Touken Ranbu	Mutsunokami Yoshiyuki		
2018	Sirius the Jaeger	Yevgraf		
2018–2019	Hunter × Hunter	Knuckle Bine	2011 series	
2018–2023	Aggretsuko	Haida		
2018–present	Boruto: Naruto Next Generations	Sai Yamanaka, Urashiki Ōtsutsuki		
2019	Ultraman	Shiraishi, others		
2019	Neon Genesis Evangelion	Kensuke Aida	Netflix redub	
2019	Cells at Work!	Pneumococcus		
2019	Demon Slayer: Kimetsu no Yaiba	Demon in the temple		
2020	Marvel Future Avengers	Leader, Iron Monger, Zeke Stane		
2020	BNA: Brand New Animal	Shirou Ogami		
2020	Dorohedoro	Gyoza Fairy		
2020	The 8th Son? Are You Kidding Me?	Wendelin		
2020	Beyblade Burst Rise	Arthur Peregrine		
2020–2026	Beastars	Jack		
2021	High-Rise Invasion	Great Angel		
2021	Kuroko's Basketball	Daiki Aomine		
2021	Yashahime: Princess Half-Demon	Homura		
2021	My Hero Academia	Tomoyasu Chikazoku/Skeptic	Season 5 only	
2021–2022	Pacific Rim: The Black	Kaiju Boy	Monster form	
2021–present	Record of Ragnarok	Shiva		
2023	Digimon Adventure	Agumon, Cutemon		
2023	Mashle	Dot		
2024	Dandadan	Serpoians		
2024–present	T・P Bon	Tetsuo Shiraishi		
2024–present	Go! Go! Loser Ranger!	Aran Hekiru		
2025	Disney Twisted-Wonderland The Animation	Grim		
2026	Black Torch	Amagi, Crow, Hoodlum		

=== Western animation ===
List of voice performances in animation
Year	Series	Role	Notes	Source
1993–94	Problem Child	Junior Healy		
1997–2002	Hey Arnold!	Eugene Horowitz	Seasons 2–4	
2002–08	Codename: Kids Next Door	Numbuh 1, Numbuh 2, Delightful Children from Down the Lane, additional voices		
2005	Avatar: The Last Airbender	Hahn	2 episodes	
2006–07	Squirrel Boy	Eddie J. Squirrel		
2006	Codename: Kids Next Door – Operation Z.E.R.O.	Numbuh 1, Numbuh 2, Delightful Children from Down the Lane, Numbuh 101	Television film	
2007	The Grim Adventures of Billy & Mandy	Numbuh 1, Numbuh 2, Delightful Children from Down the Lane	Episode: "The Grim Adventures of the KND"	
2008–09	The Spectacular Spider-Man	Eddie Brock / Venom		
2011	Mad	Big Bird, Guardian, Mongolian		
2011–22	Young Justice	Orion, Ma'alefa'ak, Brainiac 5, Cullen Row, Harm		
2012	Huntik: Secrets & Seekers	Harrison Fears		
2012–14	Star Wars: The Clone Wars	Various voices		
2013–15	Hulk and the Agents of S.M.A.S.H.	Skaar, Bulldozer, Fandral, Miek, additional voices		
2015	Lego Marvel Super Heroes: Avengers Reassembled	Spider-Man	Television special	
2015–16	Ultimate Spider-Man	Spider-Ham, Morbius, Skaar, Blood Spider		
2015–16	Popples	Mike Mine		
2015–16	Regular Show	Steffen, Milton, Aiden		
2015–17	Be Cool, Scooby-Doo!	Elton Ploy, Prince Shlemielius		
2015–present	Miraculous: Tales of Ladybug & Cat Noir	Nino Lahiffe / Carapace (Seasons 1–3), Max Kanté / Pegasus (Seasons 1–3), Nooroo, Sass, XY, Butler Jean, Loïc Stompet		
2017	Bunnicula	Russell	Episode: "Brussel Boy"	
2017	Danger & Eggs	Tappy	Episode: "Trading Post"	
2017–19	Spider-Man	Flash Thompson, Spencer Smythe, Venom, Burglar		
2018	The Powerpuff Girls	Logan Logan / The Sporde	Episode: "Never Been Blissed"	
2018–19	The Adventures of Rocky and Bullwinkle	Boris Badenov, others		
2018–22	Muppet Babies	Gonzo, Rizzo the Rat		
2020	ZooPhobia	Rusty	Episode: "Bad Luck Jack"; web short	
2021	He-Man and the Masters of the Universe	Keldor/Skeletor		
2021–24	Star Wars: The Bad Batch	AZI-3	7 episodes	
2026	Helluva Boss	Gorilla Suit Guy, Waiter	Episode: "Mission: Bigfoot"	
TBA	Interstellar Ranger Commence		Browntable Animation	

=== Films ===
List of voice performances in film
Year	Title	Role	Notes	Source
2012	Wings	Mr. Cumberbun, Patrick, Wicketts		
2012	Secret of the Wings	Slush		
2012	Bleach: Hell Verse	Shuren		
2013	Top Cat: The Movie	Spook		
2013	Alpha and Omega 2: A Howl-iday Adventure	Humphrey		
2014	Alpha and Omega 3: The Great Wolf Games	Humphrey		
2014	Team Hot Wheels: The Origin of Awesome!	Brandon, Sandwich Guy		
2014	Alpha and Omega 4: The Legend of the Saw Tooth Cave	Humphrey		
2015	Alpha and Omega 5: Family Vacation	Humphrey		
2015	The Last: Naruto the Movie	Sai		
2016	Kingsglaive: Final Fantasy XV	Pelna Khara		
2017	Sailor Moon R: The Movie	Fiore	Viz Media dub	
2017	K: Missing Kings	Misaki Yata		
2018	The Seven Deadly Sins the Movie: Prisoners of the Sky	Ban		
2019	Evangelion Death (True)^{2}	Kensuke Aida	Netflix redub	
2019	Millennium Actress	Kyoji Ida	2019 redub	
2021	The Seven Deadly Sins: Cursed by Light	Ban		
2021	Kuroko's Basketball The Movie: Last Game	Daiki Aomine	Netflix dub	
2022	Drifting Home	Yuzuru Tachibana	Netflix dub	
2023	Legion of Super-Heroes	Arm Fall Off Boy, Brainiac 2	Direct-to-video	
2024	Ghost Cat Anzu	Frog		

=== Live-action ===
List of acting performances in film
Year	Title	Role	Notes	Source
1987	Baby Boom	Ben		
1990	Kindergarten Cop	Sylvester		
1992	Out on a Limb	Henry		
1992	Mr. Saturday Night	Stan (age 9)		
1993	The Pickle	Little Boy 1945		
1995	Just Like Dad	Charlie Spiegel		
2005	The Night Before Christmas	Lee Powell		

List of acting performances in television
Year	Series	Role	Notes	Source
1989	The Wonder Years	Young Paul Pfieffer	Episode: "Birthday Boy"	
1990	Get a Life	Danny	Episode: "Pile of Death"	
1993	California Dreams	Young Sly	Episode: "Save The Shark"	
1997	Chicago Hope	Young Aaron	Episode: "Brain Salad Surgery"	
1997	Suddenly Susan	Willie	Episode: "Susan's Minor Complication"	
2000	The Amanda Show	Joey	Episode 13	
2001	100 Deeds for Eddie McDowd	Marvin	Episode: "Personal Trainer"	
2004	Drake & Josh	Student	Episode: "Mean Teacher"	
2008	Zoey 101	Colin (voice only)	Episode: "Trading Places"	
2017–2022	Legends of Tomorrow	Beebo (voice)	3 episodes	
2018	The Flash	Beebo (voice)	Episode: "The Elongated Knight Rises"	
2021	Beebo Saves Christmas	Beebo (voice)	TV special	

=== Video games ===
List of voice performances in video games
Year	Title	Role	Notes	Source
2003	Tony Hawk's Underground	Eric Sparrow	Credited as Voice Actors	
2003	Ratchet & Clank: Going Commando	Stuart Zurgo		
2004	Tony Hawk's Underground 2	Eric Sparrow	Credited as V.O. Actors	
2004	The Bard's Tale	Additional voices	Credited as Ben Diskin	
2004	Full Spectrum Warrior	Private Ota	Credited as Ben Diskin	
2005	Codename: Kids Next Door – Operation: V.I.D.E.O.G.A.M.E.	Numbuh 1, Numbuh 2, Delightful Children From Down The Lane		
2006	Call of Duty 3	Private Leroy Huxley		
2006	Tony Hawk's Project 8	Local Skater		
2007	Rogue Galaxy	Jupis Tooki McGanel		
2007	Tony Hawk's Proving Ground	Custom Skater, Eric Sparrow		
2009	Cartoon Network Universe: FusionFall	Numbuh 1, Numbuh 2		
2010	Final Fantasy XIII	Cocoon Inhabitants		
2011	Captain America: Super Soldier	Allied Forces		
2011	Naruto Shippuden: Ultimate Ninja Impact	Sai		
2011	Cartoon Network: Punch Time Explosion XL	Numbuh 1, Numbuh 2		
2012	Naruto Shippuden: Ultimate Ninja Storm Generations	Sai		
2012	Kingdom Hearts 3D: Dream Drop Distance	Young Xehanort		
2012	Halo 4	Jared Miller		
2013	Naruto Shippuden: Ultimate Ninja Storm 3	Sai		
2013	Marvel Heroes	Rhino		
2013	Rune Factory 4	Kiel	Also Special	
2014	WildStar	Aurin Male		
2014	Sonic Boom: Rise of Lyric	Q-N-C		Tweet
2014	Digimon All-Star Rumble	Shoutmon, Gallantmon		
2014	Kingdom Hearts HD 2.5 Remix	Young Xehanort		
2015	Lord of Magna: Maiden Heaven	Gewalt		
2015	Tales of Zestiria	Atakk, Wardell, Amethor		Tweet
2015	Xenoblade Chronicles X	Male Cross (Joker)		
2015–2019	The Legend of Heroes: Trails of Cold Steel	Jusis Albarea	Also Trails of Cold Steel 2, 3 and 4	
2017	Tales of Berseria	Rokurou Rangetsu		Tweet
2017	Fire Emblem Heroes	Jakob, Saizo, Matthew		
2017	Nier: Automata	Additional voices		
2017	Puyo Puyo Tetris	Lemres, Sig	Uncredited (Note: This title does not list voice actors in the closing credits)	Tweet
2017	Digimon World: Next Order	Shoutmon		Tweet
2017	Marvel vs. Capcom: Infinite	Nova		
2018	BlazBlue: Cross Tag Battle	Merkava		Tweet
2018	Conan Exiles	Gilzan the Treasure Hunter		
2018	Radiant Historia: Perfect Chronology	Marco		
2018	Octopath Traveler	Additional voices		
2018	Mega Man 11	Mega Man		
2018	Soulcalibur VI	Additional voices		
2018–2024	The Elder Scrolls Online	Augur of the Obscure, Jee-Lar, Za'ji, Hyacinth, Additional Voices		
2019	Kingdom Hearts III	Young Xehanort		
2019	Sekiro: Shadows Die Twice	Fujioka the Info Breaker	English Voice actor	
2019	Bloodstained: Ritual of the Night	Johannes, Bathin		
2019	Fire Emblem: Three Houses	Lorenz, Caspar		
2019	Mr Love: Queen's Choice	Victor	Credited as English Voice	
2019	Digimon ReArise	Dorumon		
2019	Indivisible	Dhar		
2020	13 Sentinels: Aegis Rim	Kyuta Shiba	English Voice actor	
2020	The Legend of Heroes: Trails of Cold Steel IV	Jusis Albarea, Count Egret		
2021	Persona 5 Strikers	Additional voices		
2021	Lost Judgment	Dento Sakura		
2022	Fire Emblem Warriors: Three Hopes	Caspar von Bergliez, Lorenz Gloucester		
2022	Star Ocean: The Divine Force	Velanj Garfuul		
2022	Tactics Ogre: Reborn	Dukas Windelband Gatialo		
2023	The Legend of Heroes: Trails into Reverie	Jusis Albarea, Soldiers & Citizens of Zemuria		
2024	Like a Dragon: Infinite Wealth	Additional voices		
2024	Final Fantasy VII Rebirth	Glenn Lodbrok		
2024	Puyo Puyo Puzzle Pop	Lemres, Sig		
2024	Sonic X Shadow Generations	Black Doom		
2025	Like a Dragon: Pirate Yakuza in Hawaii	Additional voices		
2025	Xenoblade Chronicles X: Definitive Edition	Male Cross (Joker), Kelemen		
2025	Date Everything!	Franklin Lieste	Credited as Ben Diskin	
2025	Towa and the Guardians of the Sacred Tree	Gaisei, Hakke, Male 1		
2025	Dune Awakening	Urbano Montag		
2026	Grand Theft Auto VI	The Local Population	Credited as Ben Diskin	

== Awards and nominations ==
Year	Award	Category	Title	Result	Source
1991	Young Artist Awards	Outstanding Young Ensemble Cast in a Motion Picture	Kindergarten Cop	Won	
2019	Daytime Emmy Award	Outstanding Performer in a Preschool Animated Program	Muppet Babies	Won	
