= Benjamin Gluck =

American filmmaker

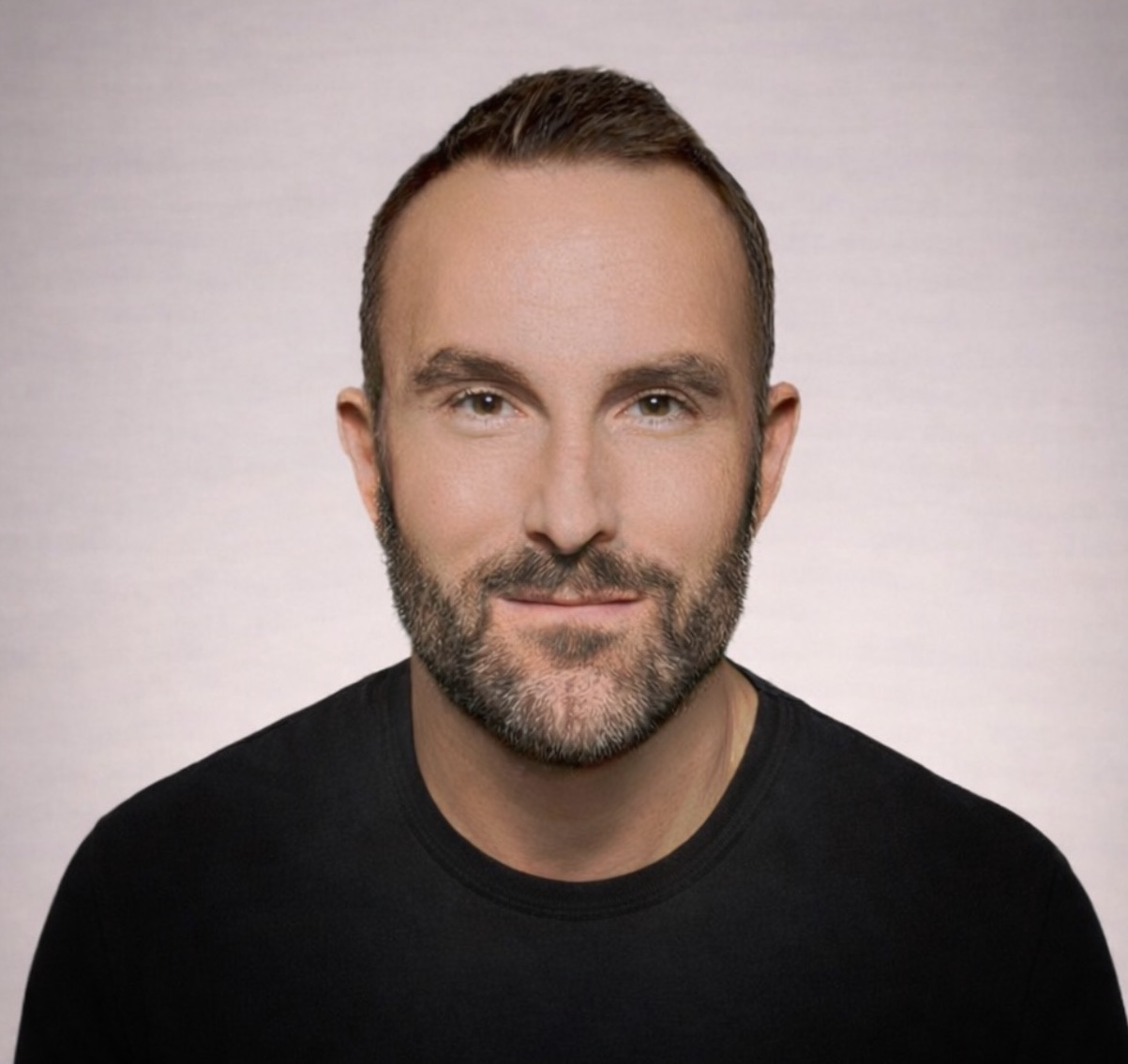
- Benjamin Gluck in 2026
- Born: Benjamin Gluck; St. Louis, Missouri, U.S.
- Education: California Institute of the Arts
- Occupations: Head of Story, Director, Storyboard Artist
- Years active: 1996–present
- Known for: Peanuts, 9, Walt Disney Animation Studios .

Benjamin Gluck is an American head of story and director known for his story work across major animated features including 9 (Focus Features), Bambi 2 (Disney), as well as the Apple TV+ specials Snoopy Presents: To Mom (and Dad), With Love and Snoopy Presents: For Auld Lang Syne. He also directed Disney's Brother Bear 2 and Alpha and Omega (Lionsgate).

== Early life ==
Benjamin Gluck was born in St. Louis, Missouri. He attended California Institute of the Arts (CalArts) where he earned a Bachelor of Fine Arts degree in Character Animation. His student film Man's Best Friend was awarded the Walter Lantz Animation Prize. The film later premiered on MTV's network and screened theatrically as part of the Spike and Mike's Festival of Animation.

== Career ==
Upon graduating from CalArts, Gluck became the first story trainee at DreamWorks Animation. He subsequently joined Walt Disney Feature Animation, contributing to multiple theatrical films and later serving as Head of Story and Director on studio releases, including Bambi II, Piglet's Big Movie, and Brother Bear II.

After Disney, Gluck served as Head of Story on the Tim Burton-produced 9 for Focus Features. He later co-directed Lionsgate Family Entertainment feature Alpha and Omega. From 2018 to 2019, Gluck served as Senior Studio Executive and Head of Story at Alpha Animation.

Gluck played a key creative role in the modernization of Peanuts, serving as Head of Story for the Apple TV+ specials Snoopy Presents: For Auld Lang Syne, and Snoopy Presents: To Mom (and Dad), With Love, the latter marking the first explicit acknowledgement of LGBTQ+ families in the history of the Peanuts animated franchise.

== Filmography ==
Year	Title	Credits	Awards
2022	Snoopy Presents: To Mom (and Dad), With Love	Head of Story	Children's and Family Emmy-Nominee. Humanitarian Award-Nominee. Kidscreen Award-Winner: Best Holiday Special.
2021	Snoopy Presents: For Auld Lang Syne	Head of Story	Annie Award-Nominee: Best Animated Special Production
2016	Madea's Tough Love	Story Editor	Dove "Family Approved Seal” Award-Recipient
2013	Kahlil Gibran's, The Prophet	Storyboard Artist	Visionary Award-Winner
2010	Alpha and Omega	Director	Annie Award-nominee: Best Animated Feature
2010	Yogi Bear	Storyboard Artist	
2009	9	Head of Story	VES Award-Nominee: Outstanding Animation in an Animated Feature Motion Picture
2006	Brother Bear II	Director	Annie Award-nominee: Best Screenplay
2006	Bambi II	Head of Story	Annie Award-Winner: Best Home Entertainment Production
2004	Home on the Range	Storyboard Artist	
2003	Piglet's Big Movie	Storyboard Artist	
2001	The Emperor's New Groove	Storyboard Artist	
2000	Dinosaur	Storyboard Artist	
2000	Clerks (TV) Season 1/Episode 2: Wherein Dante and Randle are Locked in the Freezer	Storyboard Artist	
2000	Rugrats (TV) Season 8/Episode 3: Don't Poop On My Parade	Storyboard Artist	Daytime Emmy Award-Winner
1998	The Prince of Egypt	Storyboard Artist	
1998	Spike and Mike's Festival of Animation Man's Best Friend		
1996	MTV's Cartoon Sushi; Man's Best Friend	Director / Creator	Walter Lantz Award-Winner

== Television ==
- Rugrats (TV) (2000)
- Clerks (TV) (2001)
- MTV's Cartoon Sushi's Man's Best Friend (1998)

== See also ==
- Modern animation in the United States
- Walt Disney Animation Studios
- Disney and LGBT representation in animation
