= Christmas at Cattle Hill =

2020 Norwegian Christmas film

- Film poster
- Norwegian: Jul på KuToppen
- Directed by: Will Ashurst
- Screenplay by: Ole Christian Solbakken
- Produced by: Heidi Palm Sandberg; Ove Heiborg
- Edited by: Simen Malmø
- Music by: Gaute Storaas
- Production company: Qvisten Animation
- Distributed by: SF Studios Norge
- Release date: 6 November 2020
- Running time: 68 minutes
- Country: Norway
- Language: Norwegian
- Box office: $1,088,688

Christmas at Cattle Hill (Norwegian: Jul på KuToppen) is a 2020 Norwegian animated Christmas film directed by Will Ashurst from a screenplay by Ole Christian Solbakken. A sequel to Cattle Hill (2018), it was produced by Qvisten Animation. Heidi Palm Sandberg and Ove Heiborg acted as producers. Christmas at Cattle Hill was released theatrically in Norway on 6 November 2020, grossing $1,088,688.

== Premise ==
Klara is excited to spend her first Christmas on Cattle Hill with her father. But when her father is unexpectedly called away for work, Klara sees it as an opportunity to transform Cattle Hill into a Christmas paradise with the aid of a cheeky Christmas elf.

== Voice cast ==
- Henriette Faye-Schjøll as Klara
- Sigrid Bonde Tusvik as Kari, Klara's mother
- Fridtjov Såheim as Mosk, Klara's father
- Marit A. Andreassen as Chickolina
- Mats Eldøen as Guttegeiten Gaute
- Charlotte Frogner as Pauline

== Production ==
The soundtrack for the film was composed by Gaute Storaas.

== Release ==
Christmas at Cattle Hill was released in Norwegian cinemas on 6 November 2020 by SF Studios Norge and Paycom Multimedia. It opened with $159,779, for a total box office gross of $1,088,688. It received over 100,000 admissions during late 2020.
