= Eric Price =

American actor and comedian (born 1974)

- Born: July 19, 1974 (age 52); Bay View, Wisconsin, U.S.
- Occupations: Actor, comedian
- Years active: 2005–present

Eric Price (born July 19, 1974) is an American actor and comedian who is most notable for his membership in the recurring cast of comedians on sketch comedy series MADtv during its 14th Season. He is also known for his voice roles as Paddy and Mooch in Alpha and Omega and its first sequel.

== Biography ==
=== Early years ===
Price was born on July 19, 1974, in Bay View, Wisconsin. He worked at ComedySportz for several years in Milwaukee before making it to Hollywood. During his years in Milwaukee, Price appeared for a number of years with the seminal improv troupe The Dead Alewives, several members of which have gone on to entertainment industry acclaim since the group's dissolution.

== Career ==
=== MADtv ===
Price joined the cast of MADtv in 2008 as a featured performer for the show's final season on FOX (season 14; 2008–2009 season). Despite not being featured much in episodes, Price had a recurring character (Darnell, the effeminate gay student in Coach Hines' gym class) and some memorable celebrity impressions (Don Knotts' Barney Fife from The Andy Griffith Show, Gordon Ramsey, Warren Buffett, Robert De Niro, Tim Gunn, Caroll Spinney (as his character Big Bird from Sesame Street, taking over for Jordan Peele following his departure the previous season) and Kevin Jonas of The Jonas Brothers).

==== Characters ====
Character	Sketch	Season of first appearance	Catch phrase	Notes
Darnell	Coach Hines	14	None	An effeminate gay student in Coach Hines' gym class. Had a crush on the coach, who sees his sexual behavior as signs that he's a model student.

==== Impressions ====
Celebrity	Sketch	Season of first appearance	Notes
Warren Buffett	Various	14	American investor, businessman and philanthropist.
Robert De Niro	Various	14	Actor
Len Goodman	Various	14	Dancer
Tim Gunn	Various	14	Fashion consultant
Kevin Jonas	Various	14	Musician; member of the Jonas Brothers
Phil Keoghan	Various	14	television personality
Don Knotts	Various	14	As his character Barney Fife from The Andy Griffith Show.
Nigel Lythgoe	Various	14	Director, producer
Gordon Ramsay	Various	14	Chef, television personality
Caroll Spinney	Various	14	As his character Big Bird from Sesame Street.

=== Other projects ===
Price also had a voice role in the animated comedy-drama, Alpha and Omega. The film was released on September 17, 2010. He also reprised his role in Alpha and Omega 2: A Howl-iday Adventure, which came out on October 8, 2013.

== Filmography ==
=== Movie appearances ===
Year	Title	Role	Box office performance	Director	Other notes
2005	The Godfather of Green Bay	Ratboy	N/A	Pete Schwaba	Comedy
2007	Inner Dudes	Steve	N/A	Jeff Crocker	Comedy (Short Film)
2007	Reno 911!: Miami	Wrestling Referee	$22,021,262 (worldwide)	Robert Ben Garant	Comedy
2010	Alpha and Omega	Paddy/Mooch	$60,507,267	Anthony Bell; Ben Gluck	Comedy/Drama, Animation
2013	Alpha and Omega 2: A Howl-iday Adventure	Paddy	N/A	Richard Rich	Comedy/Adventure, Animation

=== Television appearances ===
Year	Title	Role	Total episodes	Other notes
2005–2009	Reno 911!	Various	3	Comedy/mockumentary
2006	Campus Ladies	Geek	1	
2007	American Body Shop	Tony	1	
2008–2009, 2016	MADtv	Various Characters	12	Sketch Comedy

=== Video games ===
Year	Title	Role	Other notes
2007	Flight of the Living Dead: Outbreak on a Plane	Madison	
