= List of dominance hierarchy species =

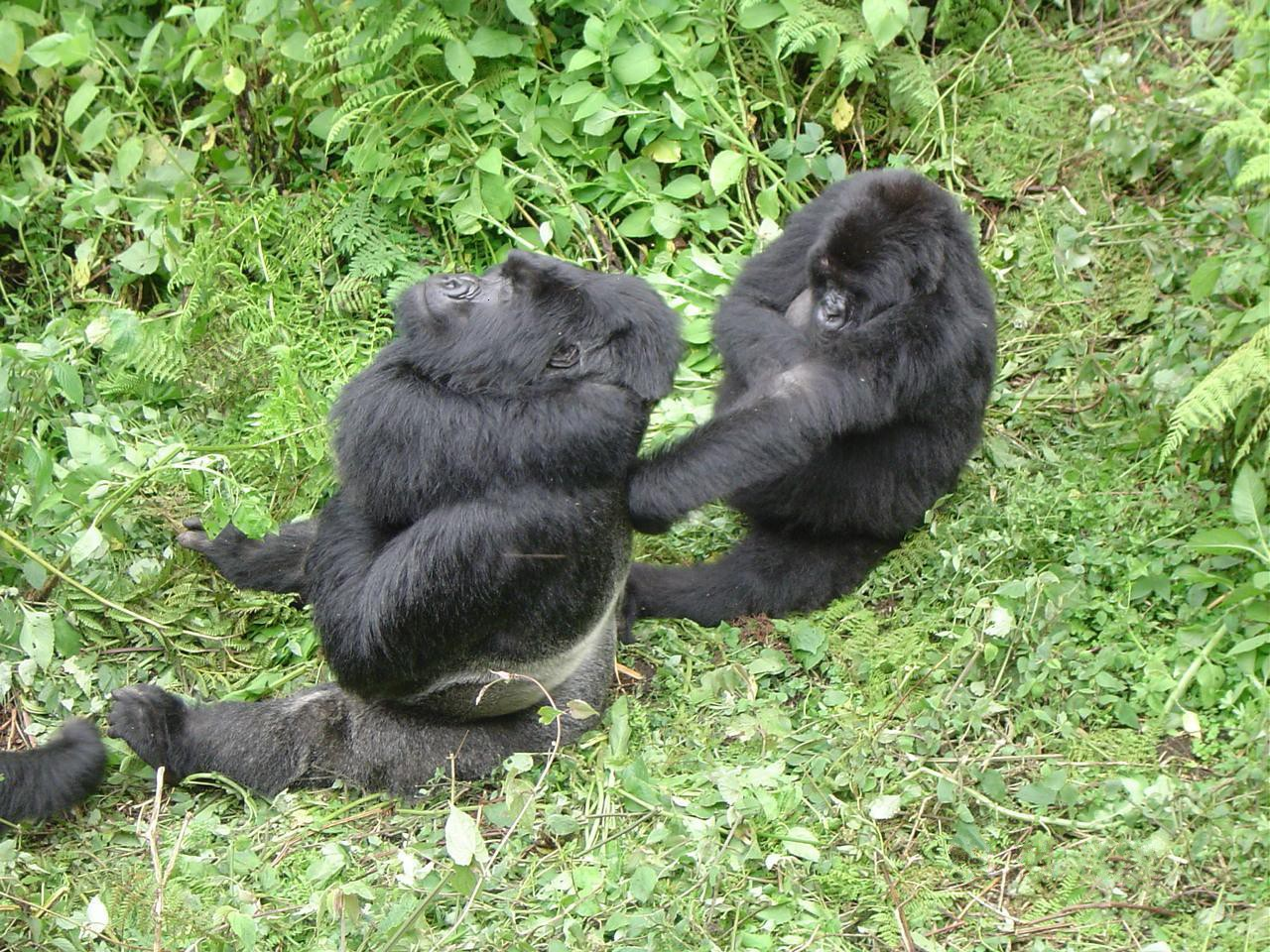
Gorillas form social groups with a dominance hierarchy, often topped by a large silverback male.

Dominance hierarchies occur in many social animals.

== Primates ==
Researcher M. W. Foster investigated primates and found that the leaders were more likely to be those who did more for those around them instead of being determined by strength.

=== Baboons ===
Alpha male baboons monopolize resources and mating access to females, and they are also more likely to suffer from stress. Lower status males must expend more time and energy for mating opportunities. Alpha males may sometimes allow subordinate males to have access to mating, so the subordinate males can serve as "spare dads" and protect their offspring from other alpha males.

=== Capuchin monkeys ===
A study on the association of alpha males and females during the non-breeding season in wild Capuchin monkeys examined whether alpha males are the preferred mate for females and, secondly, whether female-alpha status and relationship to the alpha-male can be explained through the individual characteristics and or social network of the female. The results indicated that alpha male Capuchin are the preferred mate for adult females. However, only the alpha females had strong interactions with the alpha males by virtue of a dominance hierarchy among the females in which only the most dominant and strong females were able to interact with the alpha male.

=== Chimpanzees ===
Common chimpanzee males use strength, intelligence, and political alliances to establish and maintain alpha position. There have been rare cases where a group has killed and even eaten the alpha male. Common chimpanzees show deference to the alpha of the community by ritualized postures and gestures such as presenting their back, crouching, bowing, or bobbing. Chimpanzees lower in rank than the alpha male will offer their hand while grunting to the alpha male as a sign of submission.

Bonobo chimpanzee society on the other hand is governed by alpha females. Males will associate with females for rank acquisition because females dominate the social environment. If a male is to achieve alpha status in a bonobo group, he must be accepted by the alpha female. Female bonobos will interact sexually to increase social status. High-ranking females rarely interact sexually with other females, but low-ranking females interact sexually with all females.

=== Gorillas ===
Gorillas use intimidation to establish and maintain alpha position. A study conducted regarding the reproductive behavior of male mountain gorillas (Gorilla beringei beringei) found further evidence that dominant males are favored to father offspring, even when there is a greater number of males in a notably enlarged group size. The study also concluded that mating access dropped off less steeply with status, so that non-dominant males had mating success more similar to the alpha male than had been expected.

=== Mandrills ===
Adult male mandrills with alpha status display vivid coloration on their skin, while those with beta status are more dull in colour. Both types of males engage in mating, but only the dominant alpha males have the ability to produce offspring. Male mandrills sometimes fight for breeding rights which results in dominance. Though conflicts are rare, they can be deadly. Gaining dominance, that is becoming the alpha male, results in an "increased testicular volume, reddening of sexual skin on the face and genitalia, and heightened secretion of the sternal cutaneous gland". When a male loses dominance or its alpha status, the reverse happens, although the blue ridges remain brightened. There is also a fall in its reproductive success. This effect is gradual and takes place over a few years. When beta males mate-guard a female, the competition between them allows the alpha males to have a greater chance of producing offspring, since betas outnumber alphas 21 to 1.

== Carnivora ==
=== Seals ===
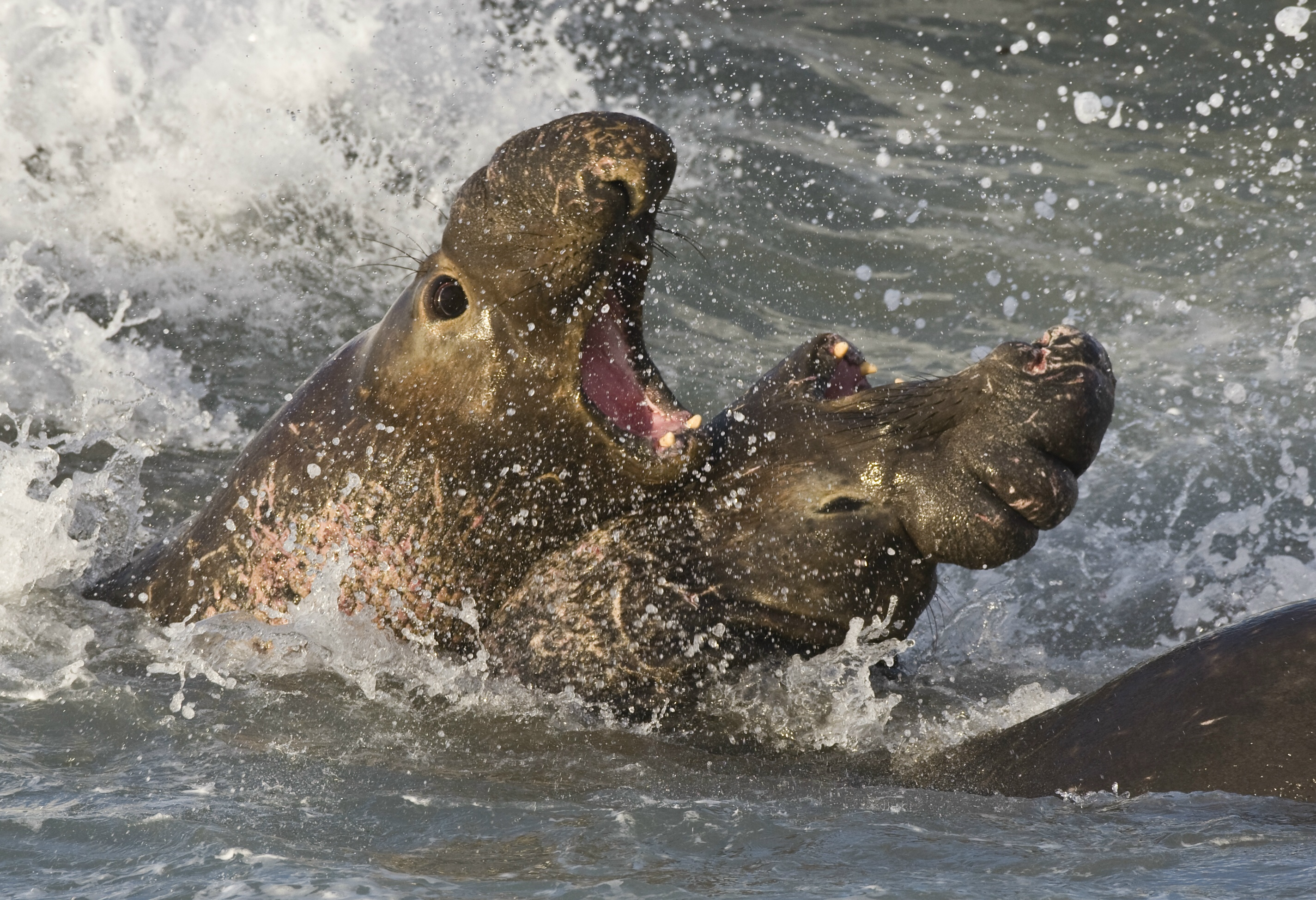
Male elephant seals fighting at Piedras Blancas, California

Dominant male elephant seals arrive at potential breeding sites in spring, and fast to ensure that they can mate with as many females as possible. Male elephant seals use fighting, vocal noises, and different positions to determine who will be deemed the dominant male. When males reach eight to nine years of age, they have developed a pronounced long nose, in addition to a chest shield, which is thickened skin in their chest area. They display their dominance by showing their noses, making loud vocalisations, and altering their postures. They fight each other by raising themselves and ramming each other with their chests and teeth.

When females arrive, the dominating males have already selected their territory on the beach. Females cluster in groups called harems, which could consist of up to 50 females surrounding one alpha male. Outside of these groups, a beta bull is normally roaming around on the beach. The beta bull helps the alpha by preventing other males accessing the females. In return, the beta bull might have an opportunity to mate with one of the females while the alpha is occupied.

=== Canids ===
In the past, the prevailing view on gray wolf packs was that they consisted of individuals vying with each other for dominance, with dominant gray wolves being referred to as the "alpha" male and female, and the subordinates as "beta" and "omega" wolves. This terminology was first used in 1947 by Rudolf Schenkel of the University of Basel, who based his findings on researching the behavior of captive gray wolves. This view on gray wolf pack dynamics was later popularized by the researcher L. David Mech in his 1970 book The Wolf. He later found additional evidence that the concept of an Alpha male may have been an interpretation of incomplete data and formally disavowed this terminology in 1999. He explained that it was heavily based on the behavior of captive packs consisting of unrelated individuals, an error reflecting the once prevailing view that wild pack formation occurred in winter among independent gray wolves. Later research on wild gray wolves revealed that the pack is usually a family consisting of a breeding pair and their offspring of the previous 1–3 years. In the article, Mech wrote that the use of the term "alpha" to describe the breeding pair adds no additional information, and is "no more appropriate than referring to a human parent or a doe deer as an alpha." He further notes the terminology falsely implies a "force-based dominance hierarchy." In 13 years of summer observations of wild wolves, he witnessed no dominance contests between them.

In some other wild canids, the alpha male may not have exclusive access to the alpha female. Other pack members as in the African wild dog (Lycaon pictus) may guard the maternity den used by the alpha female.

== Birds ==
=== Chiroxiphia ===
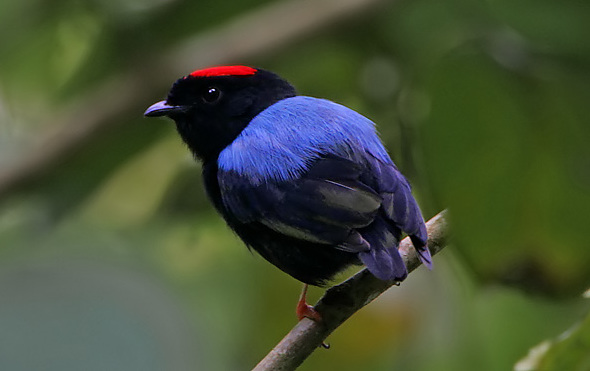
Alpha male Chiroxiphia manakins have full male colors, whereas beta males retain female-like plumage.

Male Chiroxiphia manakins can typically be designated alpha and beta, since there is a clear dominance relationship between them. There is only ever one alpha male, but, depending on species, there may be one or two beta males. Beta males are sometimes sub-adults - easily recognized, as their plumage retain female-like characters. Only the alpha male is ever seen to mate with the female.

=== Montezuma oropendolas ===
Webster et al. observed that males defend sexually-receptive females, suggesting that Montezuma oropendolas have a female-defence mating system. While the females nest, the males fight and fend off one another, and the males were ranked depending on the outcome of each fight. The alpha male eventually pushes out all other males until he is the only one left. When the alpha males leave the others come back and defend females until he returns. This type of mating system is similar to that of polygynous mammals, not birds.

=== Pale chanting goshawks ===
Normally, female pale chanting goshawks mate with a single male (monogamy), but in "broken veld" vegetation (a prey-rich habitat in the Little Karoo), a female and two males may form a polyandrous trio. In these cases an alpha male and female will be assisted in raising the young by a beta male. The alpha male copulates with the female 31-5 days before laying while the beta male copulates 5-3 days before laying. Subordinate co-breeding males may have reproductive fitness benefits by assisting the alpha female with nest defense and prey provision. Non-breeding individuals from previous broods may remain in their natal territory and form part of the breeding group.

== Fish ==
=== Cichlids ===
Aggressive behavior in cichlids is ritualized and consists of multiple displays used to seek confrontation while being involved in evaluation of competitors, coinciding with temporal proximity to mating. Displays of ritualized aggression in cichlids include a remarkably rapid change in coloration, during which a successfully dominant territorial male assumes a more vivid and brighter coloration, while a subordinate or "nonterritorial" male assumes a dull-pale coloration. In addition to color displays, cichlids employ their lateral lines to sense movements of water around their opponents to evaluate the competing male for physical traits/fitness. Male cichlids are very territorial due to the pressure of reproduction, and establish their territory and social status by physically driving out challenging males (novel intruders) through lateral displays (parallel orientation, uncovering gills), biting, or mouth fights (head-on collisions of open mouths, measuring jaw sizes, and biting each other's jaws). The cichlid social dichotomy is composed of a single dominant with multiple subordinates, where the physical aggression of males becomes a contest for resources (mates, territory, food). Female cichlids prefer to mate with a successfully alpha male with vivid coloration, whose territory has food readily available.

=== Moon wrasse ===
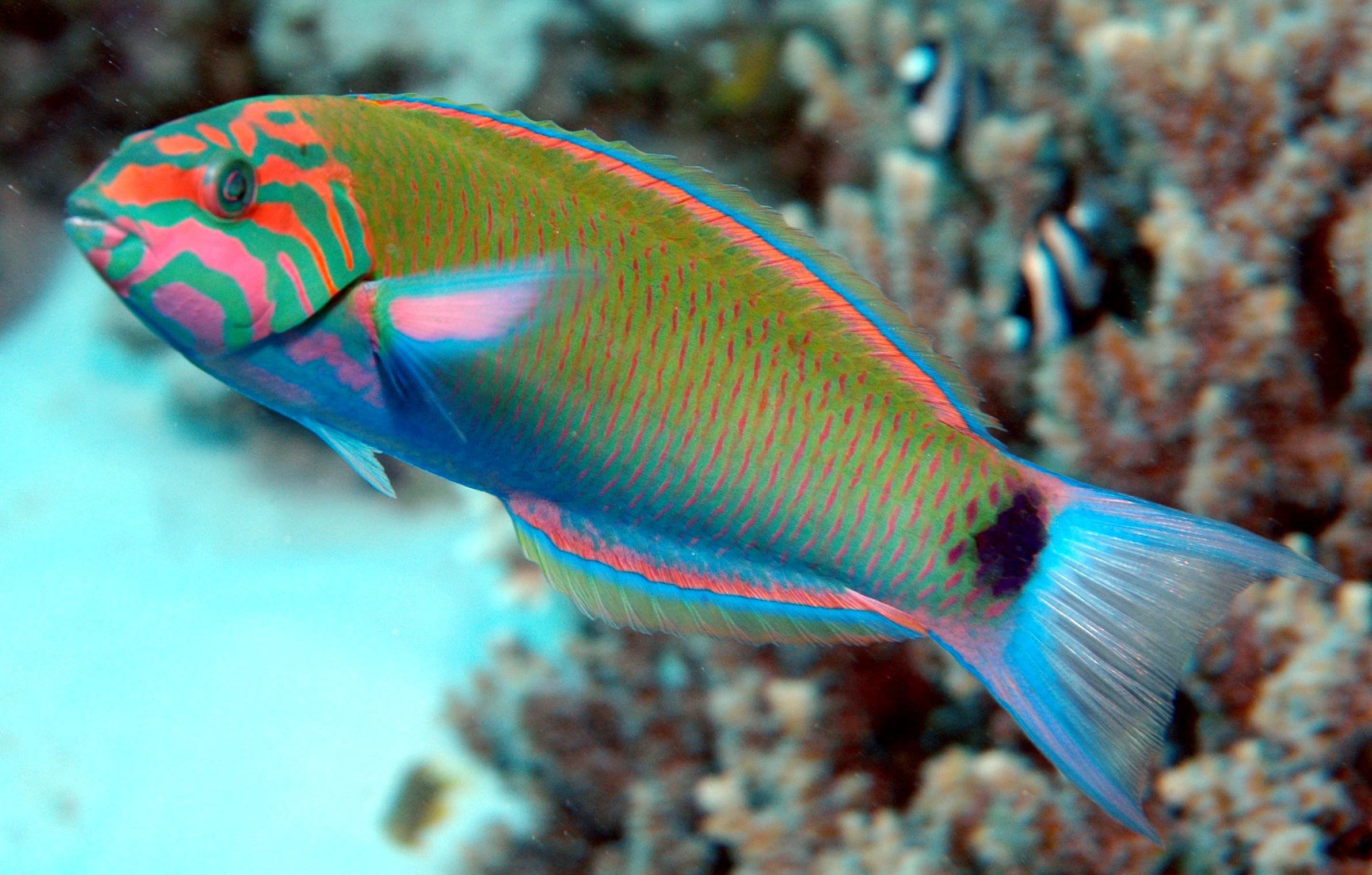
The alpha male moon wrasse is brightly colored.

Some moon wrasses live in groups consisted of a dominant male, and a "harem" of about a dozen other wrasses, some female and some male. The alpha male is more brightly colored, and at every low tide hour, changes from green to blue, and goes into a show of attacking and nipping all the other wrasses. This is his way of showing his dominance to the rest of the males and keeping the females in check. During breeding season and before high tide, the alpha male turns completely blue, gathers up every single female, and the spawning frenzy begins.

=== Mozambique tilapia ===
Mozambique tilapias often travel in groups where a strict dominance hierarchy is maintained. Positions within the hierarchy correlate with territoriality, courtship rate, nest size, aggression, and hormone production. In terms of social structure, Mozambique tilapias engage in a system known as lek-breeding, where males establish territories with dominance hierarchies while females travel between them. Social hierarchies typically develop because of competition for limited resources including food, territories, or mates. During the breeding season, males cluster around certain territory, forming a dense aggregation in shallow water. This aggregation forms the basis of the lek through which the females preferentially choose their mates. Reproductive success by males within the lek is highly correlated to social status and dominance.

In experiments with captive tilapias, evidence demonstrates the formation of linear hierarchies where the alpha male participates in significantly more agonistic interactions. Thus, males that are higher ranked initiate much more aggressive acts than subordinate males. However, contrary to popular belief, Mozambique tilapias display more agonistic interactions towards fish that are farther apart in the hierarchy scale than they do towards individuals closer in rank. One hypothesis behind this action rests with the fact that aggressive actions are costly. In this context, members of this social system tend to avoid confrontations with neighboring ranks in order to conserve resources rather than engage in an unclear and risky fight. Instead, dominant individuals seek to bully subordinate tilapias both for an easy fight and to keep their rank.

== Lagomorphs ==
=== Pikas ===
The American pika (Ochotona princeps) is known to maintain strict territorial boundaries, and dominance between individuals is enforced through a dominant pika invading another pika's territory, forcing the latter out. The general hierarchy of dominance has been observed (higher to lower in dominance) from male to female and adult to juvenile. Pikas with greater body mass were perceived as more dominant.

=== Rabbits ===
Both domestic rabbits (Oryctolagus cuniculus) and wild rabbits, such as the swamp rabbit (Sylvilagus aquaticus), maintain dominance hierarchies in control of territory and frequency of copulation. Social strata within groups of female domestic rabbits have been observed.

== See also ==
- Apex predator
