= Sigrid Bonde Tusvik =

Norwegian comedian and writer

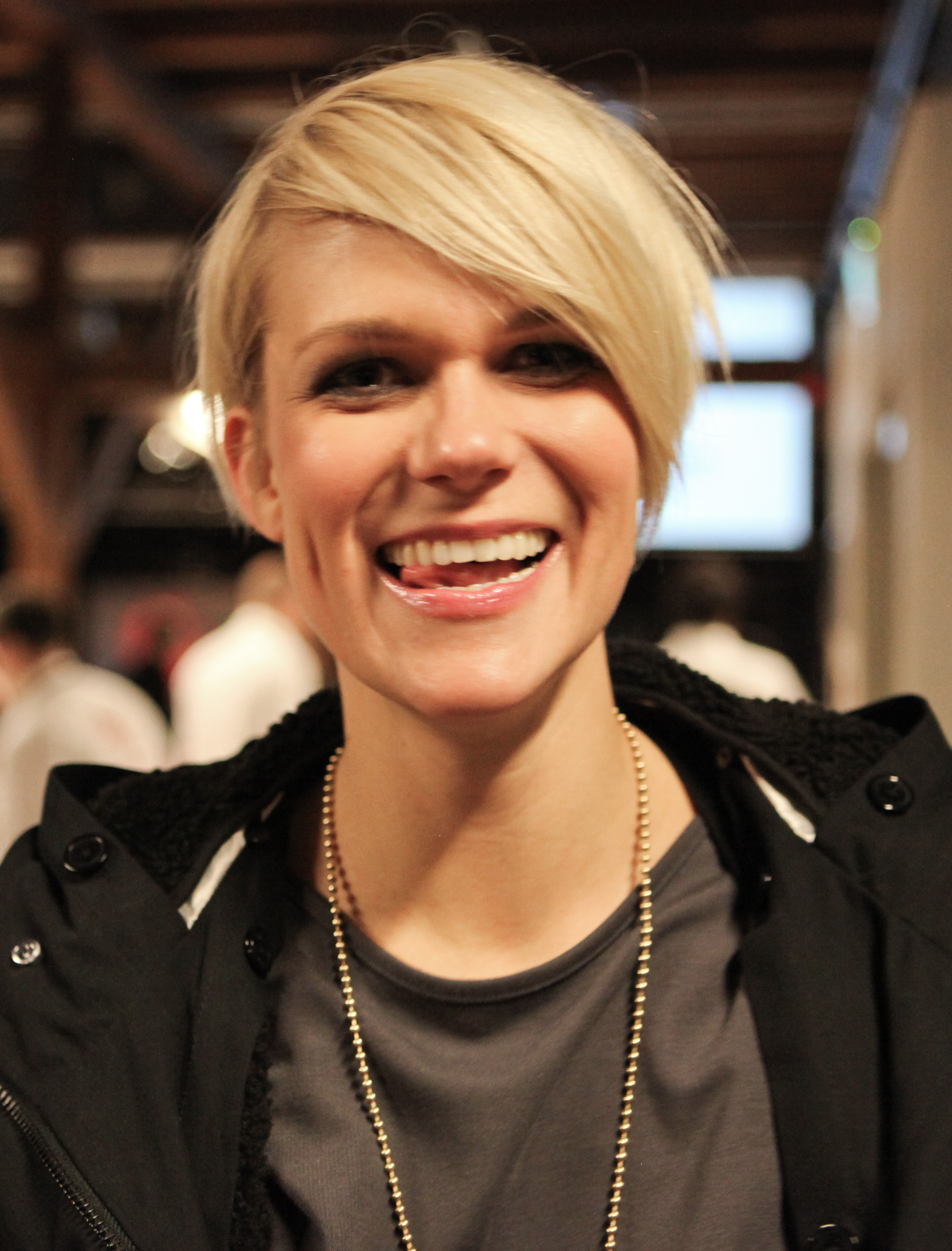
Sigrid Bonde Tusvik in 2010

Sigrid Bonde Tusvik (born 2 February 1980) is a Norwegian television presenter and entertainer.

== Early life ==
Tusvik was born in Nordstrand in Oslo, Norway. She went to Westerdals School of Communication.

== Career ==
She has appeared many times on the television programme Torsdag kveld fra Nydalen (Thursday night from Nydalen) on the Norwegian television channel TV 2.

=== Publications ===
- Noe med media: en bok om hva du kan bli (Something with Media: A book about what you can become), 2008, ISBN 9788248908340
- Glitterfitter: helt sanne historier om å være ung kvinne (Glittercunts: totally true stories about being a young woman), 2009, ISBN 9788248908944

=== Filmography ===
- Hjelp, vi er i filmbransjen (2011)

== Personal life ==
Tusvik is married to Martin Jøndahl who works for the Norwegian television channel VGTV. They have a son and daughter.
