= Annexation of Puerto Rico =

Annexation of Puerto Rico may refer to:

- The culmination of the Puerto Rican Campaign, ratified at the Treaty of Paris
- A football play in the 1994 film Little Giants, more commonly known as a fumblerooski
- A single from the eponymous 2006 album by A Static Lullaby
