= Grace Under Fire =

American television sitcom (1993–1998)

- Genre: Sitcom
- Created by: Chuck Lorre
- Starring: Brett Butler; Dave Thomas; Julie White; Casey Sander; Jon Paul Steuer; Sam Horrigan; Kaitlin Cullum; Dylan and Cole Sprouse; Peggy Rea; Charles Hallahan; Don "D.C." Curry; Lauren Tom
- Theme music composer: Michael O'Brien
- Opening theme: "Lady Madonna" by Aretha Franklin (1993–96); "Perfect World" by Michael O'Brien (1996–98; also used in syndication for all 1993–96 episodes)
- Composers: Dennis C. Brown; Mark Hayes
- Country of origin: United States
- Original language: English
- No. of seasons: 5
- No. of episodes: 112 (list of episodes)

Production
- Executive producers: Marcy Carsey; Tom Werner; Caryn Mandabach; Brett Butler; Tim Doyle; Marc Flanagan; Peter Tortorici; Chuck Lorre; Tom Straw; David Tochterman
- Producers: J.J. Wall; Joanne Curley-Kerner; Paul Raley; Stevie Ray Fromstein; Franco Bario; Danny Zuker; Matt Berry; Ric Swartzlander; Lee Aronsohn
- Camera setup: Multi-camera
- Running time: 30 minutes
- Production companies: Carsey-Werner Productions; Chuck Lorre Productions (uncredited)

Original release
- Network: ABC
- Release: September 29, 1993 – February 17, 1998

Grace Under Fire is an American television sitcom that aired on ABC from September 29, 1993, to February 17, 1998. Created by Chuck Lorre, the series starred Brett Butler as Grace Kelly, a single mother and recovering alcoholic raising three children in a small town in Missouri after finally divorcing her abusive husband. The series was produced by Carsey-Werner Productions, known for other hit sitcoms such as Roseanne and The Cosby Show.

The series was praised for its mix of comedy and drama, tackling serious issues such as alcoholism, domestic abuse, and single parenthood while maintaining a humorous tone. It became one of ABC’s most-watched sitcoms during its early seasons and earned Butler critical acclaim, including a Golden Globe nomination and multiple People’s Choice Awards.

Despite its initial success, the show faced production difficulties, largely due to Butler’s personal struggles, leading to cast changes and a decline in ratings. It was ultimately canceled in 1998 after five seasons.

== Premise ==
Grace Under Fire, produced by Carsey-Werner, was part of a wave of shows in the late 1980s and 1990s that were built around a comedian (and in some cases, closely based on his or her comedy routine). Many of Carsey-Werner's shows were based on nontraditional, non-nuclear families.

Grace Under Fire followed a similar formula, set in the small fictitious town of Victory, Missouri; Butler starred as Grace Kelly, a divorced single mother and recovering alcoholic. The show begins after the main character divorces her abusive alcoholic husband of eight years in an attempt to start life anew and prevent her children from making the same mistakes she did. The show revolved around Grace; her children, mischievous Quentin (Noah Segan, pilot; Jon Paul Steuer, seasons 1–3; Sam Horrigan, seasons 4–5), happy-go-lucky Libby (Kaitlin Cullum), and infant Patrick (Dylan and Cole Sprouse); her happily married best friends and neighbors, Nadine and Wade Swoboda (Julie White and Casey Sander); and the town's bachelor pharmacist, Russell Norton (Dave Thomas).

In the first three seasons, Grace operates pipelines at the local oil refinery, where she has a second family of fellow crew workers. Among them are Dougie Boudreau (Walter Olkewicz), Vic (Dave Florek), and Carl (Louis Mandylor). Their boss is Bill Davis (Charles Hallahan). Both Bill and Carl were dropped after the first season, with John Shirley (Paul Dooley) taking over as Grace's boss in the second season.

Russell's friendship with Grace and their on-and-off dating rituals are a running theme in the series. Throughout their friendship, they often date other people; for a time, Grace dates Ryan Sparks (William Fichtner), a quirky chemist who works in the oil refinery's labs. In season three, Grace enters into a relationship with suave plant executive Rick Bradshaw (Alan Autry). As with Ryan, the affair between Grace and Rick occurs despite their radically different places in the company ladder. They break up at the end of season three, although Rick later returns to see if their romance can be rekindled.

In season four, Grace begins taking college classes at night, paid for by her workplace. When the plant stops funding her education, Grace quits the oil refinery and returns to school full-time, as she only needs a few months of concentrated classes to graduate. The remainder of season four features Grace as a full-time student, and she graduates near the end of the season. In the season finale, Grace takes an entry-level position with an ad agency.

At the beginning of the fifth season, Grace quits the agency due to the commute and long working hours, and began working in the administrative end of a construction company owned by D.C. (Don "D.C." Curry). Russell finds romantic interest in Dottie (Lauren Tom), a gossiping hairstylist who is also friends with Grace. After giving birth, Nadine leaves Wade with her child and moves to Colorado.

Throughout the entire series, Grace's ex-husband Jimmy Kelly (Geoff Pierson) often reappears, sometimes causing problems and at other times clean and sober, trying to win Grace back. The pair never reunite, but they settle into a good friendship for the sake of the kids. In the midst of Jimmy's attempts to become a better person, his father Emmett (Bryan Clark) is revealed to be gay, after Grace and Rick inadvertently run into him in a gay bar; following Emmett's sudden death, his sexuality and secret same-sex affair is revealed to the rest of his family during his funeral. At this time, Jimmy's mother Jean (Peggy Rea), Grace's disapproving and moralizing former mother-in-law, offers to move in and help Grace raise the kids.

Russell reconciles with his estranged father Floyd (Tom Poston), who moves in with him and joins him at the pharmacy. Grace's sister Faith (Valri Bromfield) appears in the first two seasons as well as a regular source of support. In one episode, Grace is contacted by her first child, Matthew (guest star Tom Everett Scott), whom she gave up for adoption in high school; Matthew also meets his biological father (guest star Barry Bostwick).

In later seasons, Dot replaces Nadine in the role of friend and confidant, and in turn is replaced by Bev Henderson (Julia Duffy), an old friend who returns to town. Grace and Bev's personal reunion is the last major storyline of the series; the show was canceled shortly after the character's introduction.

== Cast ==
The season 4 characters of Grace Under Fire (from left to right), Floyd, Nadine, Wade, Libby, Grace, Patrick, Quentin, Jean, and Russell.

=== Main cast ===
- Brett Butler as Grace Burdette-Kelly
- Dave Thomas as Russell Norton
- Julie White as Nadine Swoboda (1993–1997)
- Casey Sander as Wade Swoboda
- Jon Paul Steuer as Quentin Kelly (1993–1996)
- Sam Horrigan as Quentin Kelly (1996–1998)
- Kaitlin Cullum as Elizabeth Louise "Libby" Kelly
- Dylan and Cole Sprouse as Patrick Kelly
- Charles Hallahan as Bill Davis (1993–1994)
- Walter Olkewicz as Dougie Boudreau (1993–1994; recurring, 1994–1996)
- Don "D.C." Curry as D.C. (1997–1998)
- Lauren Tom as Dot (1997–1998)

=== Recurring cast ===
- Tom Poston as Floyd Norton (1995–1998)
- Paul Dooley as John Shirley (1994–1996)
- Dave Florek as Vic (1993–1996)
- Alan Autry as Rick Bradshaw (1995–1996)
- Peggy Rea as Jean Kelly (1995–1998)
- Geoff Pierson as James "Jimmy" Kelly
- Louis Mandylor as Carl (1993–1994)
- Valri Bromfield as Faith Burdette (1993–1995)
- William Fichtner as Ryan Sparks (1994)
- Julia Duffy as Bev Henderson (1998)

== Episodes ==
Season	Episodes	Originally released		Rank	Average rating
Season	Episodes	First released	Last released	Rank	Average rating
1	22	September 29, 1993	May 25, 1994	#5	17.9
2	26	September 20, 1994	May 24, 1995	#4	18.8
3	25	September 13, 1995	May 15, 1996	#13	13.2
4	25	September 18, 1996	May 7, 1997	#45 (tie)	9.1
5	14	November 25, 1997	February 17, 1998	#68 (tie)	TBA

Grace Under Fire was the highest-rated new sitcom and freshman American television series of the 1993–94 season. One month before the series premiered, Showtime had broadcast the Carsey Werner-produced Brett Butler Special, a half-hour comedy performance by Butler.

=== "Viva Las Vegas" ===
The episode "Vega$" is part of a crossover with Coach, The Drew Carey Show and Ellen set in Las Vegas. It features Drew Carey as Drew Carey, Joely Fisher as Paige Clark, Jeremy Piven as Spence Kovak and Jerry Van Dyke as Luther Van Dam.

== Production ==
The show was created by Chuck Lorre, who was fresh off three years of writing for Roseanne. Lorre wrote six episodes of the first season but left afterwards; in a 2001 interview, Dave Thomas described it as a power struggle between the two because of Butler's desire to have control of the show for herself, which on a "not consciously intentional" level helped to hinder the show. Thomas himself tried to leave the show but could not do so due to his contract. He described the mood among the people on the show after Lorre's departure as such: "We were all just trying to get through this, make the money, and get out with some shred of dignity and pride."

=== Controversy and cancellation ===
As the third season concluded in the spring of 1996, Jon Paul Steuer left the series. Sources have speculated that Steuer's mother pulled him out of the show after an incident with Butler, who allegedly flashed her breasts at the 12-year-old actor. In the fourth and fifth seasons of the show, Butler was fighting a painkiller addiction, for which she eventually sought medical help. Cast member Julie White left the show after Season 4, also citing Butler's behavior as the reason. With the February 17, 1998, telecast, ABC canceled the series.

== Syndication ==
The series aired in syndication on the Oxygen Network in the United States. In the United Kingdom, the series was picked up by BBC2 where it aired from 1994 to 1999. The show was added to Hulu on March 1, 2014. Upon the network's April 15, 2015, launch, the series began airing on the American digital broadcast network Laff, which has carried Grace Under Fire largely until its removal in 2021.

== Awards and nominations ==
Grace Under Fire was nominated for three Golden Globe Awards: Best Performance by an Actress in a TV Series Comedy/Musical in 1995 and 1997 and Best TV Series Comedy/Musical in 1995.

Jean Stapleton was nominated for the 1995 Outstanding Guest Actress in a Comedy series Emmy Award for playing Aunt Vivian in the episode "The Road to Paris Texas." Diane Ladd was nominated for the same award the previous year for playing Louise Burdett in the episode entitled "Things Left Undone" written by Brett Butler and Wayne Lemon.

== Home media ==
On May 4, 2015, it was announced that Visual Entertainment Inc. (VEI) had acquired the rights to the series in Region 1. Grace Under Fire: The Complete Collection was released on DVD on October 6, 2015.

== International remakes ==
The show was remade in Russia as Lyuba, Children and the Factory in 2005. A Polish adaptation, Hela w opałach (Hela Under Fire; Hela is short form from Helen), aired on TVN in September 2006.

Also there is another Russian adaptation as Ольга (Olga). The show premiered on TNT on September 5, 2016.
