= Peggy Rea =

American actress (1921–2011)

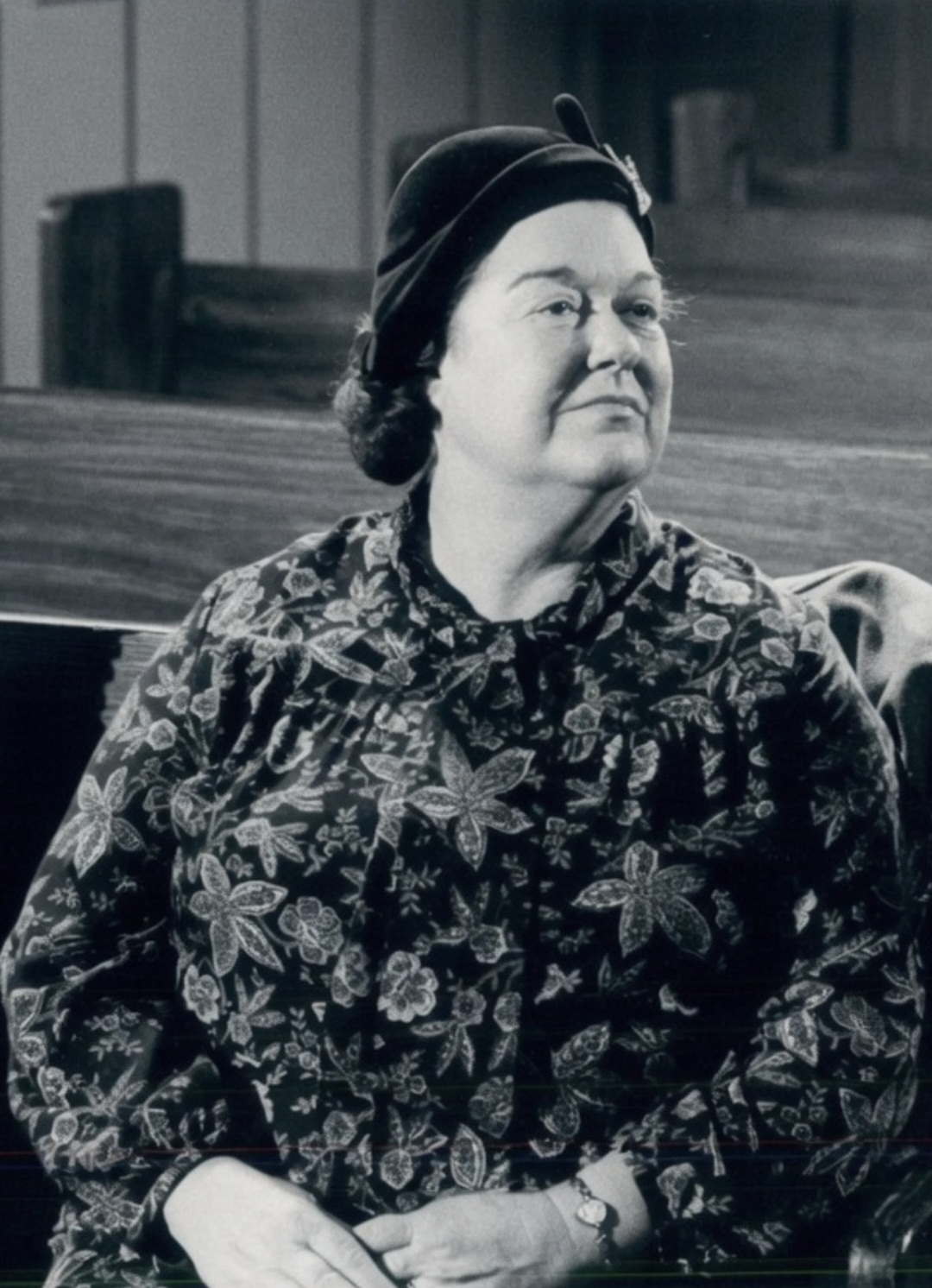
- Rea in The Waltons, 1979
- Born: Margaret Jane Rea; March 31, 1921; Los Angeles, California, U.S.
- Died: February 5, 2011 (aged 89); Toluca Lake, California, U.S.
- Occupation: Actress
- Years active: 1953–1998

Peggy Jane Rea (March 31, 1921 – February 5, 2011) was an American actress known for her many roles in television, often playing matronly characters.

== Life and career ==
Before she became an actress, Rea left UCLA to attend business school. She landed a job as a production secretary at Metro-Goldwyn-Mayer in the 1940s. Later, she was an assistant to writer-musician Kay Thompson until Thompson dropped her in April 1948. Some of the points of discord apparently included Rea's insistence on staying at the Algonquin Hotel (rather than Essex House, where Thompson was staying), and disappearing, on at least one occasion, on the eve of their New York opening to see Born Yesterday on Broadway without telling Thompson. Although Thompson had severed ties with Rea, the younger woman kept in touch with other members of Thompson's family, including Thompson's mother, brother, and younger sister, with whom she enjoyed cordial relations. Rea quickly landed on her feet with a supporting role in the National Road Company production of Tennessee Williams' A Streetcar Named Desire (as Eunice Hubbell, 1948–1949) starring Anthony Quinn.

She appeared in such television shows as I Love Lucy, The Wild Wild West, Hazel, Bonanza, Have Gun – Will Travel, Gunsmoke, The Phil Silvers Show; Ironside, Burke's Law, Marcus Welby, M.D., Emergency!, All in the Family, Maude, Hunter, The Odd Couple, Gidget, Busting Loose, MacGyver and The Golden Girls.

She appeared in feature films, including Norman Lear's Cold Turkey and Norman Jewison’s In Country.

Rea is probably best known for her role as Lulu Coltrane Hogg in The Dukes of Hazzard (1979). Throughout the series' seven-year run, Rea appeared in 19 episodes as the wife of corrupt Hazzard County Commissioner Jefferson Davis "Boss" Hogg (played by Sorrell Booke).

After portraying a landlady in an earlier episode of The Waltons, Rea permanently joined the cast in 1979 in the role of Rose Burton, a cousin of Olivia Walton, a surrogate parental figure replacing Ellen Corby (Grandma), Michael Learned (Olivia), and the following year, Ralph Waite (John).

Rea remained with the series until the spring of 1981 when her character of Rose was proposed to by her beau Stanley Perkins (played by William Schallert) shortly before the show's cancellation. Rea's character of Rose appeared in the Walton's Thanksgiving Reunion in 1993. Rea later appeared as a regular on the first season of Step by Step from 1991 to 1992 and Grace Under Fire during the 1990s.

== Credits ==
Her recurring roles included:

- Clubwoman and Nurse I Love Lucy (recurring various roles)
- The Red Skelton Show 1966–1971
- Peggy on Have Gun – Will Travel (8 episodes)
- Mrs. Roniger and other roles on Gunsmoke 1962–1971
- Cousin Bertha on All in the Family
- Martha Burkhorn on All in the Family
- Rose Burton on The Waltons
- Lulu Hogg on The Dukes of Hazzard 1979–1985
- Ivy Baker on Step by Step 1991–1992
- Jean Kelly on Grace Under Fire 1993–1998 (51 episodes)

== Death ==
Rea died in Toluca Lake, California, aged 89, from heart failure on February 5, 2011.

== Filmography ==
Year	Title	Role	Notes
1964	7 Faces of Dr. Lao	Mrs. Peter Ramsey	
1964	Looking for Love	Relative	Uncredited
1965	Strange Bedfellows	Mavis Masters	
1966	Walk, Don't Run	Ukrainian Shot Putter	Uncredited
1967	Valley of the Dolls	Neely O'Hara's Vocal Coach	Uncredited
1968	Here's Lucy	Maude	
1969	The Learning Tree	Miss McClintock	
1971	Cold Turkey	Mrs. Proctor	
1971	What's the Matter with Helen?	Mrs. Schultz	
1974	Win, Place or Steal	Josephine	
1976	Lipstick	Reporter	
1979	All in the Family	Martha Birkhorn	Season 9, Ep 16
1979–1981	The Waltons	Cousin Rose Burton	seasons 8–9; 38 episodes
1979	The Dukes of Hazzard	Lulu Coltrane Hogg	
1986	Hamburger: The Motion Picture	Mrs. Cratchmatter	
1987	The Golden Girls	Mrs. Contini	
1989	Curfew	Mrs. Mary Cox	
1989	In Country	Mamaw	
1991-1992	Step by Step (TV series)	Ivy Baker	Season 1
1992	Love Field	Mrs. Heisenbuttel	
1993	Made in America	Alberta	
1993	Grace Under Fire	Jean Kelly	51 episodes
1993	A Waltons Thanksgiving Reunion	Rose Burton	TV movie
1995	Devil in a Blue Dress	Carter's Secretary	
