= Cool Runnings =

1993 American film directed by Jon Turteltaub

- Theatrical release poster
- Directed by: Jon Turteltaub
- Screenplay by: Lynn Siefert; Tommy Swerdlow; Michael Goldberg
- Story by: Lynn Siefert; Michael Ritchie
- Produced by: Dawn Steel; Chris Meledandri
- Starring: Leon; Doug E. Doug; Rawle D. Lewis; Malik Yoba; John Candy
- Cinematography: Phedon Papamichael
- Edited by: Bruce Green
- Music by: Hans Zimmer
- Production company: Walt Disney Pictures
- Distributed by: Buena Vista Pictures Distribution
- Release date: October 1, 1993
- Running time: 98 minutes
- Country: United States
- Language: English
- Budget: $17 million
- Box office: $154.9 million

Cool Runnings is a 1993 American sports comedy film directed by Jon Turteltaub from a screenplay by Lynn Siefert, Tommy Swerdlow, and Michael Goldberg, and a story by Siefert and Michael Ritchie. It is loosely based on the debut of the Jamaican national bobsleigh team at the 1988 Winter Olympics, and stars Leon, Doug E. Doug, Rawle D. Lewis, Malik Yoba and John Candy. In the film, former Olympian Irving Blitzer (Candy) coaches a novice four-man bobsleigh team from Jamaica, led by sprinter Derice Bannock (Leon).

The film was originally envisaged as a sports drama, and Jeremiah S. Chechik and Brian Gibson were attached to direct before dropping out, leading to Turteltaub being hired. Leon was cast in 1989, followed by Doug and Yoba a year later. Lewis, who had little acting experience prior to the film and was first sought as a dialect coach, joined in November 1992. Principal photography began in February 1993 and lasted until that March, with filming locations including Kingston, Discovery Bay, and Calgary. Cool Runnings is Candy's final film released in his lifetime. Its score was composed by Hans Zimmer.

Cool Runnings was theatrically released in the United States on October 1, 1993, by Buena Vista Pictures. It received positive reviews from critics, with praise for its humor, tone, and cast performances. The film grossed $154.9 million worldwide and its theme song, a cover of "I Can See Clearly Now" by Jimmy Cliff, reached number 18 on the US Billboard Hot 100.

== Plot ==
In November 1987, Jamaican sprinter Derice Bannock trains to compete in the 100 metres race at the forthcoming Summer Olympics in Seoul, but fails to advance in the trials after fellow runner Junior Bevil accidentally stumbles and falls, knocking down Derice and another competitor, Yul Brenner. Derice petitions for the race to be rerun, but is denied by committee leader Barrington Coolidge, though he shows sympathy for Derice. While in Coolidge's office, Derice sees a photograph of his late father, Ben, standing next to a fellow Olympic gold medalist. Coolidge identifies the man as Irving "Irv" Blitzer, a former bobsled champion who was disqualified for cheating in the 1972 Winter Olympics and now works as a bookie close to Derice's home. Derice realizes he could enter the upcoming Winter Olympics in Calgary by forming a bobsled team, recruiting his friend Sanka Coffie, a pushcart derby champion.

Derice and Sanka track down Blitzer, who initially refuses to help Derice but eventually agrees to coach the team after learning that he is Ben's son. A recruitment drive fails when other athletes see how dangerous bobsledding is, though Junior agrees to join the team as, like Derice, he does not want to wait four years for the next summer Olympics. Yul also joins in order to get off the island, though he is unhappy at having Junior as his team mate, still angry at him for what happened at the trials. The newly-formed team trains with Blitzer, though Coolidge refuses to provide the money needed to participate, believing the team's inexperience will embarrass Jamaica. After Derice fails to find sponsors and he, Sanka and Yul are unsuccessful raising funds themselves, Junior sells his car to finance the trip.

Upon reaching Calgary, Blitzer registers the team and borrows a rundown bobsled from Roger, one of his past teammates. The Jamaicans struggle to adapt to the cold and race conditions but improve through exercise and hard work. Derice begins to copy the techniques of the very efficient Swiss team, while the East German team – the current bobsled world record holders – constantly heckle the Jamaicans during their practices. When the team gets into a bar fight with the East Germans, Blitzer reprimands them and reminds them they are representing all of Jamaica through their actions, inspiring the team to be more serious about their conduct and training in order to qualify for the Olympics.

Overseen by Olympic committee members, which includes Blitzer's former coach Kurt Hemphill, the Jamaican team successfully complete their qualifying run, only to be excluded, supposedly for lack of competitive experience. Blitzer confronts Kemphill, who is still bitter at Blitzer for cheating, and pleads with him not to punish the Jamaicans for his past actions. The team is reinstated, and Junior, with encouragement from Yul, rebuffs his father's attempt to bring him home, firmly stating his intent to compete for Jamaica. The team's first run in competition puts them in last place, with Sanka unhappy with Derice for copying the Swiss team and believes they need to find their own rhythm. On the second day of competition they significantly improve, but on the final run their bobsled flips and crashes. Determined to finish the race, the team pick up their sled and carry it over the finish line, to the applause of other teams spectators, including all those who had doubted and ridiculed them. An epilogue says that the team returned to Jamaica as heroes, and returned to the Winter Olympics four years later to participate as equals.

== Cast ==
- Leon Robinson (credited as Leon) as Derice Bannock, son of an Olympic sprinter who serves as the driver for the Jamaican bobsled team.
- Doug E. Doug as Sanka Coffie, a pushcart racer who serves as comic relief.
- Rawle D. Lewis as Junior Bevil, a shy, educated, young man from a wealthy family who is afraid to stand up for himself. Junior sells his expensive car and forgoes a high-paying brokerage job to compete.
- Malik Yoba as Yul Brenner, a burly tough guy. Initially he hates Junior, as he blames him for the failure of his original Olympic campaign. But they become friends during the movie, as Junior defends Brenner when Sanka ridicules him, and Brenner teaches Junior to be more assertive.
- John Candy as Irving "Irv" Blitzer, a retired and disgraced bobsled gold medalist who is convinced to train the team.
- Raymond J. Barry as Kurt Hemphill, Irv's former coach who joined the Olympic Alliance.
- Larry Gilman as Larry, Irv's former teammate who now coaches the American team.
- Peter Outerbridge as Josef Grool, the obnoxious but very efficient leader of the East German team.
- Paul Coeur as Roger, one of Irv's former teammates who loans the Jamaican team a dilapidated bobsled
- Charlotte Frasca as Clive
- Lee Maynard as himself
- Alex Frasca as Colin
- Lewis Hinds as Vinnie
- Charles Hyatt as Whitby Bevil, Junior's father, a hard-working businessman, who is initially dismissive of the bobsled venture
- Winston Stona as Barrington Coolidge, the Olympic committee leader for Jamaica
- Bertina Macauley as Joy Bannock, Derice's wife
- Pauline Stone Myrie as Momma Coffie
- Kristoffer Cooper as Winston
- Bob Del Torre as USA team Driver
- Martin Hub as Czech Bobsled Driver

== Production ==
According to Leon, "there were script problems. It wasn't funny enough, the key elements were lacking, and it just wasn't working. It was meant to happen when it happened." Leon, Doug and Yoba confirmed in an interview with Empire that it was originally meant to have been a sports drama film. The film's working title was Blue Maaga. Before Jon Turteltaub was officially hired, Jeremiah S. Chechik was slated to direct until he moved on to do Benny & Joon (1993) instead. Brian Gibson was also considered to direct, but he dropped out to do What's Love Got to Do with It (1993) instead. Turteltaub used the actual ABC sports footage from the 1988 Olympics and incorporated it into the film. Turteltaub fought with Walt Disney Studios chairman Jeffrey Katzenberg about the characters' accents, as Turteltaub wished for them to be more authentic to real Jamaican accents, and Katzenberg had concerns about American audiences being able to understand the characters. Ultimately, Katzenberg threatened to replace Turteltaub if he did not comply, and Turteltaub informed the cast that he was "going to get fired if [they] don’t sound like Sebastian the Crab." This marked a pivot in the film's production, as the goal changed from attempting to authentically depict Jamaican culture to Americanizing the film for audience appeal.

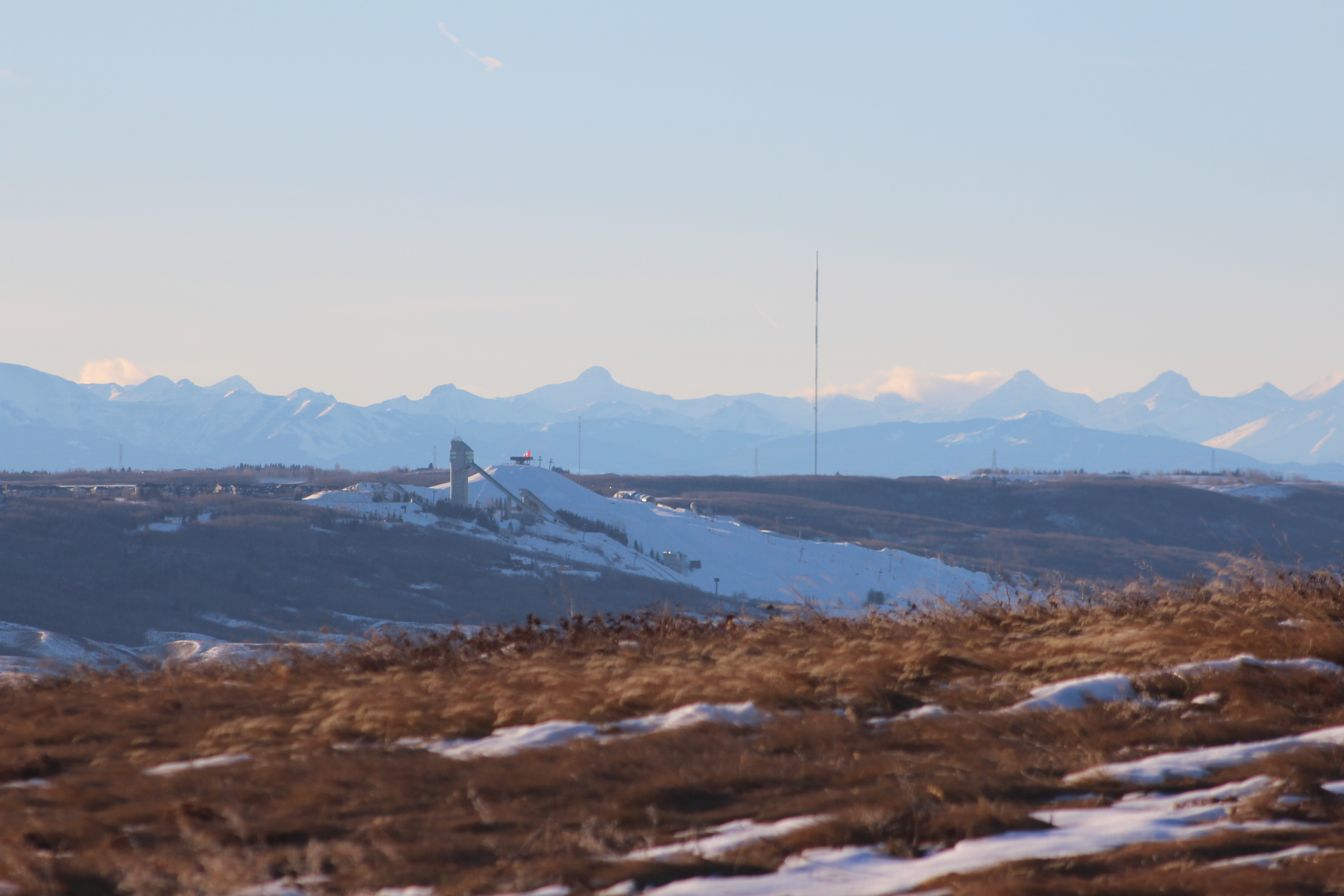
The film was set in Calgary, Canada during the celebration of 1988 Winter Olympics.

=== Casting ===
According to Leon, "The script has been following me around for 3 1/2 years." He signed on when Gibson was the director at the time. Leon told The Seattle Times, "I was signed more than a year before we actually started." Doug got involved with the film in 1990: "I found Cool Runnings three years ago, when my agent had it on his desk. I knew about the actual event it's based on, the Jamaican bobsled team that went to the '88 Olympics, and even though it's based pretty loosely I thought it made a great yarn." At the time of Doug's audition, Chechik was attached as the director. Doug told The Baltimore Sun: "I got the offer to play Sanka, the guy I'd wanted to play from the very beginning."

Lewis had very little experience and was not even allowed to audition at first. He told The Seattle Times, "I was hired to read lines to auditioning actors for just one day. That turned into three weeks. At first they told me they were looking for names, big stars, so I wouldn't be considered, but then they asked me to do a screen test." He also told The Baltimore Sun, "I came in to this film at first to coach the players in the authentic accents." Lewis was officially hired in November 1992.

Yoba told Empire that he had been introduced to the casting director, Jackie Brown, by "a gentleman by the name of Jamal Joseph." At the time of Yoba's official casting, Gibson was still slated to direct. Yoba later told Entertainment Weekly that he wrote the Jamaican bobsled song for his audition. Lewis claimed that the executives at Disney wanted Kurt Russell for the role of Coach Blitzer; however, John Candy personally insisted on portraying the coach and agreed to take a pay cut to do the movie. According to Yoba, Scott Glenn was also considered for the role. Cuba Gooding Jr., Jeffrey Wright, and Eriq La Salle were each considered for a role as one of the four Jamaican bobsledders.

=== Filming locations ===
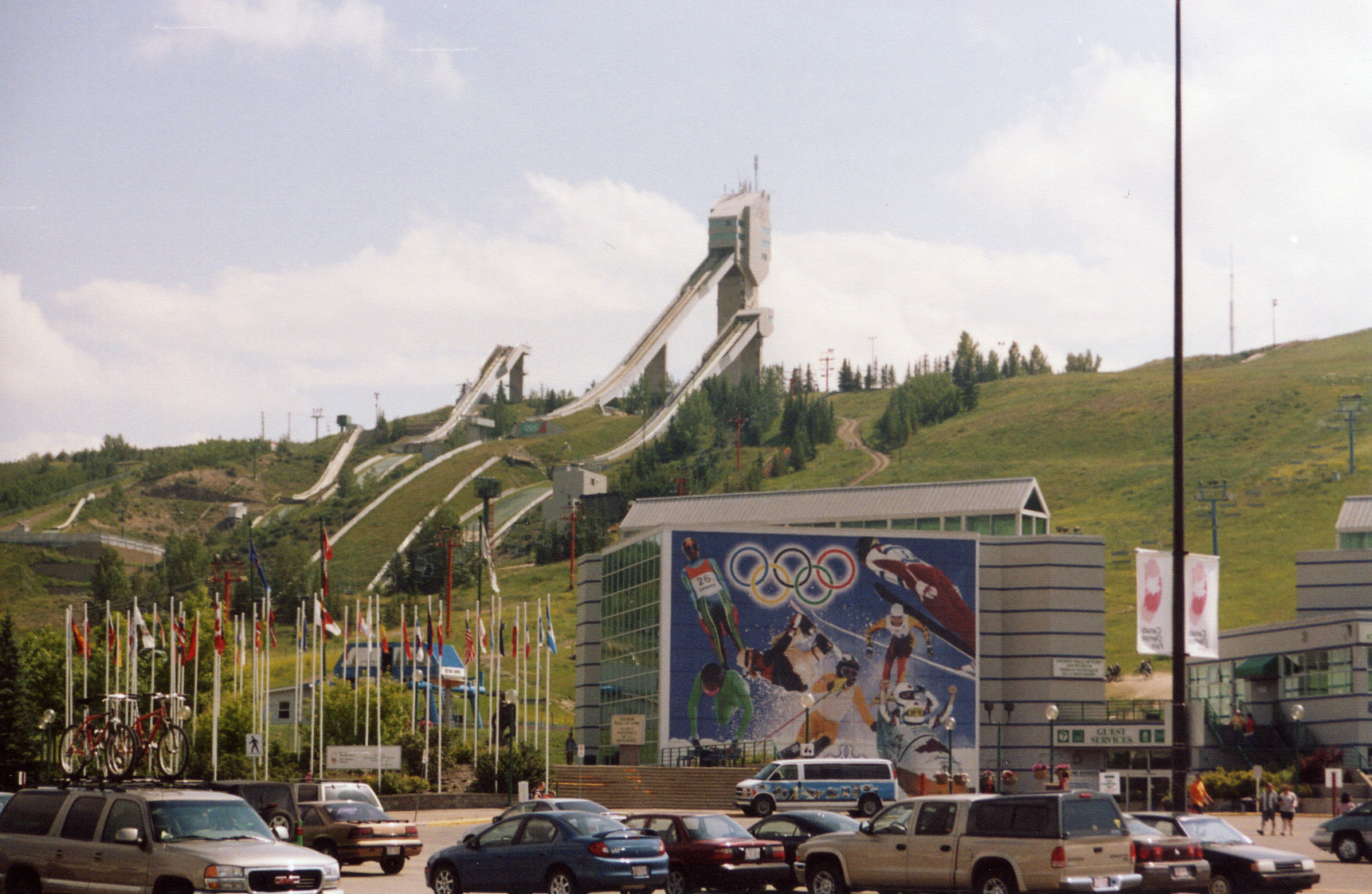
Canada Olympic Park, the site of the 1988 Winter Olympics

The film was shot in Calgary and Jamaica in February and March 1993. The cast and crew filmed in Calgary first to take advantage of the snow. Then they filmed in Jamaica at Discovery Bay and Kingston. Dawn Steel was on the set every day in Calgary and Jamaica. According to Leon, "(Steel) worked on the second unit for a while, and she said 'Never again. I never want to direct.'"

== Music ==
A soundtrack album with 11 tracks was released by Sony in 1993 on cassette and compact disc (Columbia Chaos OK 57553).

In some European countries, the soundtrack album was released by Sony with a 12th (bonus) track being "Rise Above It" performed by Lock Stock and Barrel (Columbia 474840 2).

No.	Title	Music	Length
1.	"Wild Wild Life"	Wailing Souls	3:36
2.	"I Can See Clearly Now"	Jimmy Cliff	3:16
3.	"Stir It Up"	Diana King	3:46
4.	"Cool Me Down"	Tiger	3:50
5.	"Picky Picky Head"	Wailing Souls	4:10
6.	"Jamaican Bobsledding Chant"	Worl-A-Girl	4:16
7.	"Sweet Jamaica"	Tony Rebel	3:51
8.	"Dolly My Baby"	Super Cat	3:32
9.	"The Love You Want"	Wailing Souls	3:59
10.	"Countrylypso"	Hans Zimmer	2:48
11.	"The Walk Home"	Hans Zimmer	4:37
12.	"Rise Above It"	Lock Stock and Barrel	3:32

=== Charts ===
Chart (1993–94)	Peak position
Australian Albums (ARIA)	34
New Zealand Albums (RMNZ)	5
US Billboard 200	111

== Reception ==
=== Box office ===
Cool Runnings debuted at number 3 at the US box office with a gross of $7,046,648 in its opening weekend from 1,387 theaters behind the also debuting Malice in first place and the second week of The Good Son. The following weekend it expanded to 1,803 theaters and moved up to second place grossing $9,568,699 over the 4-day Columbus Day weekend behind the opening Demolition Man. The film had total domestic earnings of $68,856,263 in the United States and Canada, and $86,000,000 internationally for a total of $154,856,263 worldwide. The film was popular in Germany (with a gross over $12 million), Japan (over $7 million) and the United Kingdom (over $8 million). The film grossed $416,771 in Jamaica.

=== Critical response ===
Cool Runnings received positive reviews, including one from Kevin Thomas of the Los Angeles Times which referred to the film as "a sweet-natured, high-spirited comedy, that rare movie that plays effectively to all ages. Even rarer, it celebrates genuine sportsmanship, placing the emphasis back on how the game is played in the face of the winning-is-everything philosophy that permeates every aspect of contemporary life."

Richard Harrington of The Washington Post wrote "a wholesome, engaging, frequently hilarious, ultimately inspirational film."

Cool Runnings has received a rating of 76% on Rotten Tomatoes based on 42 reviews. The site's consensus states "Cool Runnings rises above its formulaic sports-movie themes with charming performances, light humor, and uplifting tone." On Metacritic, it has a score of 60% based on reviews from 17 critics, indicating "mixed or average" reviews. Audiences polled by CinemaScore gave the film a grade A on scale of A to F.

== Accolades ==
American Film Institute recognition

- AFI's 100 Years...100 Cheers – Nominated
- AFI's 10 Top 10 – Nominated

== Historical differences ==
=== Competition ===
Jamaica was disqualified by the International Olympic Committee (IOC) for late entry into the competition, but pressure from several appeals, including from Prince Albert of Monaco (who competed in the event himself), led to the reversal of the decision, as opposed to an appeal by their coach.

Despite being presented as a medal contender and record setters in the film, Jamaica crashed on their third and penultimate scheduled run and struggled consistently in the competition: out of 26 contestants, they finished 24th, 25th, and 26th, with times of 58.04 seconds (24th), 59.37 seconds (25th), and 1:03 minutes (26th), becoming the only four-man team in the competition to post a time over one minute. They finished 26th overall, with a cumulative time of just over 3 minutes after three runs. If they had taken part in the final run, they would have had to complete a world-record shattering time under 48.00 seconds to win a medal.

The film implies Jamaica as the only country from a tropical climate to compete in bobsleigh at the Olympics; while they were the only Caribbean country to feature in the four-man competition, Netherlands Antilles and two teams from the U.S. Virgin Islands competed in the 38-team two-man competition, who finished 29th, 35th, and 38th, respectively. Two members of the Jamaican team (Dudley Stokes and Michael White) also competed in the two-man sled competition, completing all four runs and finishing in 30th place; Stokes and White were set to compete in two-man bobsleigh event only, with the four-man team entered to compete after the two-man event had already been completed.

=== Crash ===
In the film, the team crashes due to mechanical and structural failures in the front left blade of their bobsled on their third and final run. In reality, the crash occurred on their penultimate run and was deemed to occur due to driver inexperience, excess speed, and regressing the turn too high, which caused the sled to become unstable and top-heavy, leading it to topple onto its left side.

Real footage of the crash was used in the film but was heavily edited, and none of the characters suffered injuries; Stokes described the run and the crash as "disorienting", failing to recall the incident and only realizing they crashed after his fiberglass helmet sustained friction-burn on the ice. The team reached speeds of 130 km/h (81 mph) and their helmets scraped against the wall for 600 m (2,000 ft) until they came to a stop. The film depicts the team carrying the sled to the finish line to a slow-building standing ovation: in reality, the team walked next to it and received some sporadic applause.

== Home media ==
On November 11, 1994, the film was released on VHS and LaserDisc by Walt Disney Home Video in the United States. On August 24, 1999, the film was released on DVD by Walt Disney Home Video in the United States in Region 1. On September 1, 2000, the film was released on VHS by Walt Disney Studios in the United Kingdom. On January 22, 2001, the film was released on DVD by Walt Disney Studios in the United Kingdom in Region 2. On March 28, 2017, the film was released on region free Blu-ray as a Disney Movie Club Exclusive title. The film was made available for streaming on Disney+ on January 1, 2020.

== See also ==
- Tropical nations at the Winter Olympics
- Jamaica national bobsleigh team
- List of comedy films of the 1990s
- Jamaica at the 1988 Winter Olympics
- Eddie the Eagle
