= Pierrino Mascarino =

Italian actor

- Born: 22 September 1939; Italy
- Died: 2 June 2017 (aged 77)
- Occupation: Actor

Pierrino Mascarino (22 September 1939 – 2 June 2017) was an Italian actor perhaps best known for his lead performance in the film Uncle Nino.

Mascarino was also known for such films and television series as Tears of the Sun, Nip/Tuck, Everybody Loves Raymond and Aaron's Way.

== Filmography ==
Year	Title	Role	Notes
1972	It Ain't Easy	T	
1978	Starsky & Hutch	Tony Mariposa	Episode: "Discomania"
1981	True Confessions	Suspect	
1981	Gangster Wars	Paul Ricca	
1984	Missing in Action	Jacques	
1985	Summer Rental	Maitre D'	
1986	Let's Get Harry	Pinilla	
1995	Seinfeld	Father Hernandez	Episode: "The Face Painter"
1996	Down Periscope	Trawler Captain	
1998	Back to Even	Krachek	
1998	JAG	Signor Antinori	Episode: "Clipped Wings"
1999	Vendetta	Antonio Marchesi	TV movie
2000	Everybody Loves Raymond	Giorgio	2 episodes
2002	The 4th Tenor	Roberto	
2003	Tears of the Sun	Father Giovanni Fianni	
2003	Uncle Nino	Uncle Nino	
2005	Val/Val	Doctor	
2007	Vidrio roto	Doctor	
