= Uncle Nino =

- Film poster
- Directed by: Robert Shallcross
- Written by: Robert Shallcross
- Produced by: David James
- Starring: Joe Mantegna; Anne Archer; Pierrino Mascarino; Trevor Morgan; Gia Mantegna
- Cinematography: Hugo Cortina
- Edited by: Dan Schalk
- Music by: Larry Pecorella
- Distributed by: Lange Film Releasing
- Release date: October 21, 2003
- Running time: 104 minutes
- Country: United States
- Language: English

Uncle Nino is a 2003 American film directed by Robert Shallcross, produced by David James, and starring Joe Mantegna, Anne Archer, Pierrino Mascarino, Trevor Morgan, and Gia Mantegna.

The film deals with a dysfunctional family, who have lost their way, and a distant relative played by Pierrino Mascarino intends to bring them closer together.

== Plot ==
A father, Robert Micelli (Joe Mantegna), has become a stranger to his family and thinks only of his lawn and job. After decades of no contact, Robert's Uncle Nino (Pierrino Mascarino) flies to the United States for an unexpected visit, with a suitcase full of homemade Italian wine. Nino helps the family realize the true value of family.

== Cast ==
- Joe Mantegna as Robert Micelli
- Pierrino Mascarino as Uncle Nino
- Anne Archer as Marie
- Trevor Morgan as Bobby
- Duke Doyle as Bones
- Daniel Adebayo as Joey
- Gia Mantegna as Gina
- Gianfranco Landi as Italian Truck Driver
- Jessica Szohr as MC
- Maureen Gallagher as Ellen
- Keegan-Michael Key as Stranger in Airport
