= Robert Shallcross =

American screenwriter

- Born: United States
- Occupation(s): Film director, screenwriter

Robert Shallcross is an American film director and screenwriter and advertising writer. He worked for many years in the advertising business in Chicago. He crossed into feature-length films as a writer for the family comedy Little Giants (1994). He followed this up with Bored Silly (2000), and the family film Uncle Nino (2003).
