= Michael Goldberg (screenwriter) =

American screenwriter

Michael Goldberg (May 8, 1959 – October 2, 2014) was an American screenwriter.

A graduate of University of Michigan and Carnegie Mellon University, Goldberg scripted the films Cool Runnings (1993), Little Giants (1994) and Snow Dogs (2002).

Goldberg died October 2, 2014, of brain and sinus cancer at the age of 55. His funeral was held four days later in Philadelphia.
