= List of Grace Under Fire episodes =

The list of episodes of the American sitcom Grace Under Fire. The series aired for five seasons, totaling 112 episodes, on ABC from September 1993 to February 1998.

== Series overview ==
Season	Episodes	Originally released		Rank	Average rating
Season	Episodes	First released	Last released	Rank	Average rating
1	22	September 29, 1993	May 25, 1994	#5	17.9
2	26	September 20, 1994	May 24, 1995	#4	18.8
3	25	September 13, 1995	May 15, 1996	#13	13.2
4	25	September 18, 1996	May 7, 1997	#45 (tie)	9.1
5	14	November 25, 1997	February 17, 1998	#68 (tie)	TBA

== Episodes ==
=== Season 1 (1993–94) ===
No. overall	No. in season	Title	Directed by	Written by	Original release date	Viewers (millions)
1	1	"Pilot"	Michael Lessac	Chuck Lorre	September 29, 1993	23.1
Grace Kelly is a single mother with three children (Libby, Quentin and baby Patrick). She is set up with a pharmacist (Russell Norton) by her friend (Nadine Swoboda). Russell and Grace are both coming out of very bad marriages and end up having a good time comparing the ex-partners and betting on them. Grace gets a job in an oil refinery and has to leave on the first day when Quentin gets into a fight. She discusses her violent father with him.
2	2	"Up on the Roof"	Michael Lessac	Chuck Lorre & Bob Dolan Smith	October 6, 1993	26.1
Grace is asked out by her colleagues, but she turns all of them down. Nadine and her fourth husband (Wade Swoboda) invite Russell over for dinner. Quentin's teacher asks Grace to send Quentin to therapy as he is not paying any attention in the class. Russell helps Quentin buy a jock strap. When Russell comes for dinner, Dougie (her colleague) stops by and makes things awkward. Quentin sits alone on the roof and refuses to talk to Grace. Wade helps out.
3	3	"Grace Undergraduate"	Chuck Lorre & Michael Lessac	Dottie Dartland	October 13, 1993	23.5
Grace's in-laws (Emmet and Jean) visit to take the kids for the weekend. Jean criticizes her for the divorce. Nadine takes Grace out for a girls night-out. They play pool with some young boys. A guy hits on Grace and Nadine gives the guys a lesson on women. Russell is upset because his greedy, vicious ex-wife Barbara won't allow him to see his dog. He hangs out with Wade, who helps him steal the dog but they are caught.
4	4	"The Good, the Bad and the Pharmacist"	Michael Lessac	Wayne Lemon	October 20, 1993	25.5
Grace's paycheck is held due to Jimmy (Grace's ex-husband)'s problems with the IRS. Russell promises to help Grace and takes her out to celebrate because his divorce is finalized. He meets his wife there and goes back to her. Grace and Russell fight the next day, but he still comes to her rescue when Grace is stuck with the IRS.
5	5	"Second Time Around"	Michael Lessac	Dava Savel	October 27, 1993	29.5
Grace goes to the Second Time Around dance to meet someone new. She meets a lot of losers there and then finally Andy (Nadine's first husband). Grace, Andy, Nadine and Wade go on a double date. Things get weird.
6	6	"Sister, Sister"	Michael Lessac	Wayne Lemon	November 3, 1993	25.6
Grace's sisters (Evie and Faith) visit to surprise her on her birthday. Evie drinks a lot and seems to be heading on the same path as Grace. So Faith asks Grace to talk to her. At the party, Evie hits on Wade, which freaks out Nadine. Faith shows interest in Russell.
7	7	"A Picture's Worth... $9.95"	Michael Lessac	Dottie Dartland	November 17, 1993	27.4
Grace takes a family picture. Wade sets up Grace on a blind date with a bookstore owner. She double dates with Russell and his new girlfriend. It turns out to be a huge disaster. Libby gives Grace a very hard time and claims that she hates her little brother. Quentin behaves extra nice.
8	8	"Grace Under Oath"	Michael Lessac	Eric Brand & Rob Kurtz	November 24, 1993	25.9
Grace has some financial difficulties and when she learns that Jimmy has won some money in a lawsuit, she decides to go after him. She drags him to court with the help of a law student and wins some money. Everybody makes fun of Russell due to a bad divorce settlement.
9	9	"Grace in the Middle"	Michael Lessac	Story by : Paul J. Raley; Teleplay by : Bill Masters	December 1, 1993	29.8
Nadine discusses starting a family with Grace. Grace's supervisor Bill lies to his wife about helping Grace build a jungle gym for her kids as an excuse to go to the track. His wife confides in her and tells her that she knows the truth. Later she walks out on Bill. Wade has a long talk with Grace about his job and quits his job and decides to fly traffic helicopters. Nadine freaks out.
10	10	"Say Goodnight, Gracie"	Michael Lessac	Eric Brand & Rob Kurtz	December 8, 1993	27.7
Grace tries to wean Patrick. When the management decides to fire the temp staff, Bill makes Grace and Wanda permanent to save their job. She gets a raise and insurance, but has to do regular night shift. She interviews some sitters, but none work out. Nadine, Russell and Wade help her out.
11	11	"Keeping Faith"	Michael Lessac	Chuck Lorre & Bob Dolan Smith	December 15, 1993	26.9
Grace decorates for Christmas with Russell's help but Quentin is sad and misses his father. Faith has an accident and Grace has to go to Alabama. Russell drives her. They bring her back home and she spends Christmas with them. Faith decides to move in with Grace. Grace meets Faith's married boyfriend.
12	12	"With This Ring"	Michael Lessac	Dava Savel	January 5, 1994	30.8
Grace takes her kids to her in-laws' house to meet their great-grand mom (Lil) from their father's side, the only in-law she actually likes. Lil gives her a ring to pass-on to Libby. Later Grace's mother-in-law, Jean, comes over to tell her that Lil has died. She asks for the ring back and when Grace refuses, she calls the police. Grace decides to go to the funeral. She is hit-on by Jimmy's brother and has a showdown with Jean.
13	13	"Simply Grace"	Michael Lessac	Bob Dolan Smith	January 12, 1994	31.5
Grace's friend Vicky (The one she met at the lawyer's office during Thanksgiving - "Grace Under Oath") needs a job and she asks Bill to give her a job. Nadine and Wade discuss having a baby. Grace gets along well with a colleague (Ryan Sparks) of hers when he visits her at home, but is interrupted by Vicky when she comes for a nightcap. Grace finally agrees to go on a date with Ryan.
14	14	"The Agony, the Ecstasy and Bill Mazeroski"	Michael Lessac	Bill Masters	January 26, 1994	33.0
Grace finds one of her old paintings in the basement and realizes how much she misses painting. She sets up a studio in the basement to pursue her hobby. Dougie invites Grace to come and play poker with Vic and Carl. When she turns it down due to lack of baby-sitter, they bring the poker game to her home. The kids' friend Sam spends a lot of time at Grace's place and his mother doesn't bother to pick him up.
15	15	"When You Wish Upon a Star"	Michael Lessac	Dottie Dartland	February 2, 1994	30.4
Ryan invites Grace for a weekend in Chicago. Grace agrees and Quentin is mad. Ryan comes late and they miss their flight. Grace spends the night at Ryan's place. Faith and Russell try to spice up their sex-life. Libby walks on them when they are on the couch.
16	16	"Valentine's Day"	Howard Murray	Chuck Lorre and Dava Savel	February 9, 1994	32.2
Ryan comes to dinner to meet the kids. Ryan invites her to go out on Valentine's Day. Faith and Russell have a fight when he introduces her to Barbara as his "Dog Groomer". On Valentine's Day, Quentin orders a pizza to celebrate and when he discovers that she is going out, he becomes very upset. Ryan cancels and leaves. They finally break-up. Nadine and Wade are trying to have a baby and they are bored that sex has become a chore for them.
17	17	"Grace and Beauty"	Michael Lessac	Michael Sardo	February 16, 1994	26.7
Grace feels bad when Libby says that her friend Caroline's mom (Trish Baldwin) is the best mom. Libby wants to participate in a beauty contest and Grace is against it. Finally Grace gives in and then helps Libby with her talent round when Trish tells her that Libby lacks "breeding".
18	18	"Tears of Joy"	Michael Lessac	Roger Garrett	March 9, 1994	35.5
Quentin gets in fights at school and gives Grace a hard time. She takes him to a psychiatrist and he recommends to Grace to deal with her own feelings about Jimmy first. Libby becomes sick and Jimmy calls her. She is overwhelmed and cries. Quentin joins her and they feel good about it.
19	19	"It Happened One Week"	Michael Lessac	Story by : Rob Kurtz & Eric Brand; Teleplay by : Paul J. Raley	March 16, 1994	30.9
Grace is laid off when there is an accident (due to Dougie's error) in the oil refinery. Faith takes Quentin and Libby to see Grace's mother (played by Diane Ladd). Grace gets a job in Nadine's bar. She meets Ryan in the bar and he tells her that his father is dead. They go back to Grace's house and make-out. Ryan expresses his wish of having another kid and Grace turns him down.
20	20	"Things Left Undone"	Michael Lessac	Brett Butler & Wayne Lemon	May 11, 1994	25.4
It's mother's day and Grace invites her mother to visit. Faith is clearly upset. When Quentin confides his dislike for Ryan to his grandma, she consoles him and convinces him to go fishing with Ryan. During dinner, Faith and her mother have a fight and she walks out with Russell. Grace tries to patch-up their relationship, but fails.
21	21	"See Quentin Run"	Michael Lessac	Chuck Lorre & Lee Aronsohn	May 18, 1994	22.4
Grace is promoted at work as a Shift Supervisor with a $50 raise. Vic, Dougie and Carl act differently after the promotion. When Jimmy asks the kids to spend the summer with him, Grace refuses and Quentin is mad. He runs away from home and goes to Ryan's place to ask for his help to go to Jimmy's place. Finally Jimmy visits to cheer up Quentin. Russell and Wade try to get a piano from Barbara's place for Libby.
22	22	"A Car and a Kiss"	Michael Lessac	Story by : David Forbes; Teleplay by : Lee Aronsohn & Bill Masters	May 25, 1994	24.6
Grace's car breaks down. She becomes fed-up and decides to sell it. She takes a car loan from her company and buys a used car with Wade and Russell's help. Libby's friend Sam visits and they play "house". When Sam's mom sees the kids kissing, she freaks out and takes away Sam.

=== Season 2 (1994–95) ===
No. overall	No. in season	Title	Directed by	Written by	Original release date	Viewers (millions)
23	1	"Grace Under Water"	Michael Lessac	Marc Flanagan	September 20, 1994	33.1
It's raining cats and dogs. Faith is finally moving out with Wade and Russell's help. Jimmy visits. He tells her that he is changing and he is trying to quit drinking. He ends up spending the night at her place. Wade loses Faith's insulin in the rain. Russell goes out to get some. Jimmy tries to get Grace to forgive him, but she asks him to leave.
24	2	"Good Ol' Grace"	Michael Lessac	Bob Dolan Smith	September 27, 1994	31.4
Nadine is upset that she has been trying for 6 months and she is still not pregnant. When she brings up the idea of visiting a fertility clinic, Wade becomes defensive and they fight. He finally comes around. Grace gets a new colleague at work; Tracy. She finds the language a bit awkward and when she takes it up with Bill, he demotes her to green crew. She then files a sex grievance against Bill. He is forced into an early retirement. Russell discusses his life with Grace while shelling peas.
25	3	"June 15, 1997"	Michael Lessac	Jeff Abugov	October 4, 1994	30.1
Grace and the guys at work get a new boss (John Shirley). Grace's landlord increases the rent by $80. To solve her financial issues, Russell suggests that she take Libby and Quentin off day-care and let her friends take care of them in turns except Thursday. She asks for a shift change to take care of the kids on Thursday but John refuses. She talks to Jimmy for child-support and gets money for a sitter, but Quentin offers to babysit. Grace agrees.
26	4	"Pitch and Woo"	Michael Lessac	Kathy Ann Stumpe	October 11, 1994	31.2
Grace, Faith, Wade and Nadine go to a ball game and then discuss men in the bar. She meets Kurb Ross (a ball player) there. She starts dating him. Nadine disapproves. Faith wants some commitment from Russell. During another ball game, he gets drunk and proposes to Grace. He then makes up with Faith.
27	5	"Jimmy's Girl"	Michael Lessac	Story by : Jimmy Aleck & Jim Keily & Bill Masters; Teleplay by : Bill Masters	October 18, 1994	31.6
Jimmy has a new girlfriend (Ramona), who is very young girl. He brings her when he comes to pick up the kids for the weekend. Grace struggles with the bank when her credit card is not accepted at the super-market. Nadine and Wade have some marital problems. Ramona comes to Grace when she has some issues with Jimmy's temper. Ramona then breaks up with Jimmy and he goes back to drinking.
28	6	"Splitsville"	Michael Lessac	G.D. Lundi	October 25, 1994	31.7
John is pushing all the guys and Grace to work very hard to win a set of golf clubs. She discovers this and blackmails him into helping out. While Grace is busy, Nadine helps out with the kids. She makes some decisions about the kids (when Quentin gets a bad math grade and when Libby shop-lifts) and feels that she is bad parent when Grace disagrees. Nadine and Wade have lots of fights and Grace tries to help them out. Nadine finally leaves him.
29	7	"The Road to Paris, Texas"	Howard Murray	Story by : Brett Butler and Alan Ball; Teleplay by : Alan Ball	November 8, 1994	25.9
Nadine is living with Grace. When Grace gets a postcard from an Aunt Vivian, she goes on a road-trip with Nadine to meet her. She leaves the kids with Faith (who is doing Russell's laundry now). Wade visits them to hang out with Russell because he is too lonely. Their car breaks down and they go into a motel. Nadine tells Grace that Wade made out with an old girlfriend and that's why she is mad. Grace tries to explain, "perfectly good people sometimes do something stupid". Wade confesses to Russell about the old girlfriend and tells him that he misses Nadine.
30	8	"Dear Grace"	Michael Lessac	Story by : Bill Masters; Teleplay by : Jeff Abugov & Bob Dolan Smith	November 15, 1994	29.4
John's single and pregnant daughter Julia shows up and John refuses to speak to her. She asks for Grace's help to bridge the gap between them. Grace and Nadine see Quentin in the mall and he refuses to recognise her so that he appears cool in front of his friends. When he does that at Russell's again, she embarrasses him on purpose. Wade asks for Russell's help to sell his pottery. Nadine buys it all when Russell finds it difficult to sell it.
31	9	"Cold Turkey"	Michael Lessac	Marc Flanagan & Kathy Ann Stumpe	November 22, 1994	30.6
The Kelly clan invades Grace's after Libby ditches their family's Thanksgiving feast.
32	10	"Ka-Boom"	Michael Lessac	J.J. Wall	November 29, 1994	30.4
The oil refinery has an explosion and one of the night shift worker dies. Grace thinks that the kids will be upset that their mother has a dangerous job, but they don't seem to care or understand. Grace and the guys get to see a new shrink at work. The oil refinery shuts down for inspection and Grace gets a substitute secretarial job. Dougie does very well but Grace is bored, scared and stressed and decides to see the shrink. Nadine and Wade decide to date again to give their marriage another chance.
33	11	"Grace vs. Wade"	Michael Lessac	Alan Ball	December 6, 1994	34.1
Grace finds Wade's underwear in the garage and discovers that Nadine is sleeping with him. Grace slips on the Swobodas' icy walk and hurts her back; at Wade's urging, she makes an appointment with a massage therapist, Travis Taylor, who is also his friend. When Wade realizes that his homeowners' insurance has been canceled and thus won't cover the treatment, he balks at paying for the sessions and accuses Grace of making appointments because she's interested in Travis romantically. He and Grace argue; Nadine sides with Wade; Grace and Nadine have it out; Grace helps Nadine realize she wants to make her and Wade's marriage work; and Nadine moves out. Grace starts dating Travis.
34	12	"The Holidays"	Michael Lessac	Story by : J.J. Wall; Teleplay by : Kathy Ann Stumpe & Jeff Abugov	December 13, 1994	33.7
Included in Grace's Christmas package: an ex-mother-in-law with the holiday blues and an invitation to a dance with Dougie.
35	13	"The Good Mother"	Howard Murray	Eric Brand & Rob Kurtz	January 3, 1995	32.5
Grace writes a story and sends it to the local newspaper, which publishes it -- but with major edits. Quentin says he wants to live with Jimmy; Grace is angry because Jimmy suggested it to Quentin without first discussing it with her, but she agrees to let them try it for two weeks. When Grace visits them, she's impressed by how well Jimmy runs his household -- until she learns that Jean and Ramona are cooking, cleaning, and doing the laundry. Then, after only a week, Jimmy returns Quentin to Grace's because he can't handle the responsibility of being a full-time parent.
36	14	"No Money Down"	Howard Murray	Dave Thomas	January 17, 1995	27.5
Russell convinces Grace to accompany him to a TV-advertised real-estate seminar. She thinks it's a big scam but goes, with the intention of writing a quasi-exposé for the local paper. Afterward, Russell -- armed with a list he purchased at the seminar -- decides to flip a house; he and Grace visit a property where they encounter the former owner, an older man who lost his house to the bank after he was laid off and his wife's medical bills buried them. Russell realizes that as much as he wants to make money, he doesn't want to profit from the misfortune of others, so he doesn't buy the house; Grace writes instead about his integrity.
37	15	"Aging Gracefully"	Michael Lessac	Story by : Paul J. Raley; Teleplay by : Bill Masters & Bob Dylan Smith	January 31, 1995	27.3
Travis suggests that he and Grace meet each other's families. Grace is glad that he gets along with her kids, but she has started to sense that he's very controlling, an impression that is solidified when she visits his home to meet his daughter and sister. She talks to Nadine about being torn -- on the one hand, he's smart, kind, sensitive and giving; on the other, he's controlling, which was her problem with Jimmy -- and she jokes that she has "post-traumatic Jimmy syndrome." Later she talks to Wade about his post-Vietnam stresses, and he confirms that it's wise to avoid certain triggers; she decides to break up with Travis. On the work front, Vic -- thinking his wife is having an affair with an ex -- gets a toupee and gets razzed by his coworkers.
38	16	"Hello, I'm Your Mother"	Michael Lessac	Jeff Abugov	February 7, 1995	31.3
Grace gets a letter from Matthew, the boy she put up for adoption 19 years earlier. She decides to call him and then meet with him. Matthew, now in college, is very nice and they get on well, but the meeting stirs a lot of feelings in Grace.
39	17	"Grace at the Campfire"	Michael Lessac	Hollis Rich	February 14, 1995	28.3
Grace finds a tent in the garage and decides to take the kids camping. Quentin spends some time with Melissa, a girl from a neighboring campsite; Grace later discovers that Quentin has hit Melissa, and when Grace tells him that he is never to hit anyone, he replies, "C'mon, Mom -- you and Dad hit each other." Grace calls Jimmy, angry with him for having lied to Quentin; she approaches Quentin again, but he refuses to accept that his father was the sole abuser. Meanwhile, Melissa's reserved and proper mother gets tipsy and tells Grace she wants her husband to be more passionate. Later, Jimmy promises to set Quentin straight.
40	18	"Emmet's Bypass"	Michael Lessac	J.J. Wall	February 21, 1995	26.7
During Patrick's third-birthday party, Emmet has chest pains. Jean and Jimmy aren't concerned, saying it's just indigestion. Grace insists that Emmet go to the hospital, where doctors make clear that Emmet needs bypass surgery. Jean and Grace keep fighting, and Jean blames her for everything.
41	19	"Matthew Come Home"	Michael Lessac	Paul J. Raley	February 28, 1995	31.3
Matthew visits the Kelly family so he can meet his half-siblings. Quentin, feeling displaced by what he perceives as a new oldest son, is less than receptive; when Grace asks Matthew to leave the room so she can speak to Quentin, Matthew -- unsettled by seeing Grace so maternal and wondering why she didn't keep him -- leaves the house. She speaks to Quentin; Matthew returns and speaks with Grace; and gradually all make an effort to overcome old and new hurts and get to know one another.
42	20	"A Night at the Opera"	Michael Lessac	Alan Ball	March 14, 1995	29.4
Grace is stressed out by her daily routine of family and work, so Nadine suggests that she do something different and exciting. Grace, long a fan of opera, has the good fortune to win two tickets to a performance in St. Louis and sets off alone because no one could accompany her at short notice. At the opera, she meets a handsome and dashing Italian man, and, assuming that Nadine has sent him, gives him her extra ticket; they have a wonderful evening -- and she later realizes that Nadine did not send him. Grace later meets up with Russell, who is visiting St. Louis, and accompanies him as he visits his father (played by Tom Poston).
43	21	"Memphis Bound"	Michael Lessac	Alan Ball & Marc Flanagan	March 29, 1995	26.0
Faith and Russell, on reasonably good terms despite their recent breakup, head to Memphis with Grace -- the sisters so they can attend youngest sister Evie's wedding and Russell so he can see Graceland. Evie, less than thrilled to see Grace, introduces her sisters to her fiancé -- who promptly hits on Grace. When Grace tells Evie, Evie acknowledges that her fiancé is a womanizer and says she thought she could change him; strengthened by her sisters, Evie leaves him at the altar. Final appearance of Valri Bromfield as Faith.
44	22	"Sticks and Stones"	Michael Lessac	Bill Masters	April 5, 1995	24.9
Quentin returns home from a softball game with an eye injury; the coach tells Grace that he got into a fight with a new kid, Charles. Grace meets with Quentin's teacher, who tells her that Quentin used a racial slur (Charles is black). Grace, upset, asks Quentin to apologize. At the refinery, John tells his crew that he has served his 40 years at the company and is retiring; they throw him a dinner party, and Grace inadvertently embarrasses him.
45	23	"Mother and Son and Father Reunion"	Howard Murray	Kathy Ann Stumpe	May 3, 1995	22.2
Grace locates Matthew's biological father; she meets with him and tells him about Matthew, but he refuses to meet his son. Matthew is deeply hurt but accepts the situation. Several days later, while the father is visiting Grace, Matthew stops by. In a separate story line, Russell's father visits and helps out at Russell's pharmacy.
46	24	"When It Rains, They Pour"	Howard Murray	J.J. Wall & Bill Masters	May 10, 1995	19.8
Quentin's coach, Ben, asks Grace out. Later, Kurt calls and also asks her out. And, at Russell's pharmacy, she runs into Ryan, who asks her out. A little later, as she prepares for her date with Ben, the pizza-delivery guy (Ray) asks her out. She and Nadine speculate about what these men could possibly have in common; the next day, Grace accompanies Jimmy to an AA meeting -- where she sees Ryan, Ben, and Ray. She does keep her date with Ryan, during which she overlaps with Russell and a date. She also gets a letter from Travis, who is in drug rehab. Grace goes out with Ben again.
47	25	"You Can Lead a Horse to Water..."	Howard Murray	Stephen Nathan	May 17, 1995	22.8
Grace is ready to take her relationship with Ben to the next level, but he is inclined to little more than a goodnight kiss at the doorstep. He later explains that he doesn't want to be intimate until he is in a committed relationship; Grace is a bit upset at first, but as they talk about it, he decides he's ready. At work, Vic is tired and distracted, and Grace (not knowing that he's tired from many late nights as he and his wife try to conceive a child) thinks he has a drinking problem.
48	26	"Jimmy Goes Away"	Howard Murray	Jeff Abugov	May 24, 1995	17.1
Nadine reads the tarot cards for Grace and says that a big change is coming; moments later, Jimmy visits and tells Grace that he has gotten a job as a trucking-company dispatcher in Ohio. Grace invites Jimmy to dinner so he can talk to the kids about his moving away. That evening, she accompanies Russell to a business event; afterward, as Grace is about to enter her car, a man who had been amiable during the event becomes very aggressive, and it scares her. When she returns home, Jimmy and she talk about the creep and about the dynamics of their old relationship; they also say goodbye.

=== Season 3 (1995–96) ===
No. overall	No. in season	Title	Directed by	Written by	Original release date	Viewers (millions)
49	1	"Great Eggspectations"	Michael Lessac	Danny Zuker	September 13, 1995	21.1
To Grace's great shock, Nadine and Wade asks her to donate an egg so they can become parents. Grace is cornered and she agrees. She is put on Hormone shots. At work, everyone is careful with Grace due to her crazy mood swings. Dougie then mentions that he has donated sperms. Grace then seriously thinks about the egg donation and refuses Nadine. She is very upset initially and then admits that she does not want children anymore. She then reluctantly tells Wade and he also feels the same way.
50	2	"Movin' on Down"	Michael Lessac	Miriam Trogdon	September 20, 1995	24.4
Grace is demoted at work and John blames it on downsizing. She is very upset and almost decides to start drinking again. She then goes to meet her boss, Rick Bradshaw to ask for her old position. There she learns that her demotion was John's idea. When she confronts John, he admits that, he wanted to save his position for his retirement benefits, so he had to sacrifice hers. Quentin starts hugging Nadine every chance he gets. Wade get Jealous and asks Quentin to stay away from his wife. Grace then talks to Quentin about the new changes.
51	3	"Grace and Rick and the Dance of Doom"	Art Wolff	J.J. Wall	September 27, 1995	22.9
When Rick wants everyone to work on the weekend, Grace says she is busy and mentions going to a museum with Libby. He comes to meet Grace when she is with Ben, and asks her out. She refuses as he has fired many of her friends. After a chat with Nadine, she realizes that she likes Rick and agrees to see him. When Quentin trades his bike for a pair of shoes just like Wade's, he thinks that Quentin sees him as a role model. Later, he discovers that it was a co-incidence, but finds out that Quentin is worried about being short. Wade cheers him up.
52	4	"The Breakup"	Phil Ramuno	Holly Hester	October 4, 1995	19.7
Grace starts a relationship with Rick before she breaks up with Ben. She tries talking to Ben, but he changes the subject. Quentin walks in on Grace and Rick kissing. He is very upset and tells Ben. Grace and Ben breakup. Libby is fine with the new situation. Nadine starts messing up with Wade by using his toothbrush. It freaks him out and he decides to take revenge by sleeping on her side of the bed in her satin panties. Russell is angry about working with his father.
53	5	"Grace Under a Wig"	Michael Lessac	Tim Doyle	October 18, 1995	21.3
It's Halloween and Jean is visiting. Libby is in trouble with the neighbors' son as she pushes him down for saying that she is going to hell. When the neighbor gives Grace a hard time, Jean comes to her defense. Quentin decides to play pranks, so Grace grounds him. He keeps trying to sneak out. Finally, to give Grace a break, Jean sends Libby and Patrick with Nadine and asks her to leave. Grace puts on a black wig, gets a new identity and goes to a cafe, where she reads a poem and tells stories.
54	6	"Daycare"	Michael Lessac	Kevin Abbott	November 1, 1995	22.1
Grace needs a new sitter for Patrick and is unable to find any. She cannot afford the daycare as Patrick is not potty trained yet. Jean asks her to force train him, but Grace is not ready for that. She asks John for a daycare at work. He refuses, so she starts a signature campaign and asks Rick to help. John, on Rick's orders, promises a new daycare in 6 months. Grace finally force trains Patrick and sends him to daycare. Russell has a tough time dating a woman who was kissed by his father.
55	7	"Matthew Gets Busted"	Michael Lessac	Paul J. Raley	November 8, 1995	21.4
Matthew is arrested for running nude though a protest on a bet. Grace bails him out, but his adoptive mother (Emily) is not happy. When Matthew acts up, Grace puts him straight and asks him to respect his adoptive mother. She assures Emily that she is not interested in taking away Matthew from her. Russell's dad starts smoking and his wife starts a makeup counter in her pharmacy. He decides to start a photo counter and starts looking for investors, namely Wade. Finally Russell's dad invests.
56	8	"Grace Really Under Fire"	Michael Lessac	Story by : Bryan Moore; Teleplay by : Joan Binder Weiss & Kimberly Kessler	November 15, 1995	21.3
It's Grace's anniversary at work and the guys get her a ladies rest-room. During the party, they are held hostage by a disgruntled ex-employee, Jules. Grace tries to flirt her way out of it and almost succeeds when an interview by Rick on TV ruins everything. Finally the police save them and her affair with Rick is out in the open. Meanwhile back home, Nadine tries her best to hide the news from the kids and Wade covers the event from his helicopter. Russell and his dad listen to the update on a radio and pray for Grace.
57	9	"Thanks for Nothing"	Jack O'Brien	Pat Bullard	November 22, 1995	15.8
It's Thanksgiving and Jean is upset that Grace has sent Jimmy a lawyer's notice for pending dues. Emmett is out on a fishing trip and Jean is alone. Libby invites her for dinner. Quentin is upset that Rick is coming for dinner. At dinner Rick makes a great impression and everyone likes him. Grace starts a fight with him and later apologizes when she realizes that she is getting addicted to the fighting. Wade and Nadine fight over Thanksgiving dinner, as Wade wants to barbecue pork.
58	10	"Sleeping Together"	Michael Lessac	Paul J. Raley	November 29, 1995	21.8
Rick and Grace finally sleep together and it's amazing the first night. The next morning, Jean catches them kissing and asks to know who Rick is. The next night, Rick makes dinner and they have sex again. This time, it's very bad and it gets awkward. Grace tries to break-up, but he admits that he is in love. They patch up. Nadine discovers a mole on Wade's neck and when seeing the doctor comes up, he admits that he hasn't been to one since 1973. Russell then has a look and discovers that it's just tar.
59	11	"Emmet's Secret"	Michael Lessac	Donald Beck	December 6, 1995	20.4
Grace and Rick take a vacation together to St Louis, where they accidentally go to a gay bar. Back home, Jean is babysitting and Emmett is on a fishing trip. At the bar, Grace sees Emmett with another man. He confesses that he is gay and has been in a relationship for 15 years. He asks Grace not to tell Jean and she promises. Russell asks Wade to run for city council, but Nadine is against it and she is worried that the nude pics her second husband took of her may surface.
60	12	"Emmet, We Hardly Knew Ye"	Michael Lessac	J.J. Wall	December 20, 1995	19.5
The Kelly family's Christmas celebration is dampened when Emmett dies suddenly. During his funeral, his "significant other" appears at the funeral. Grace tries to keep Emmett's secret, but the truth comes out. Jean goes into denial, but finally comes to terms with the truth. Jimmy is worried that he might be gay too.
61	13	"Daddy's Girl"	Michael Lessac	Ric Swartzlander	January 3, 1996	20.8
Grace meets Rick's daughter, Amy, who is rather ill-mannered and not Grace's cup of tea, but she controls Rick and isn't too happy to see Grace. When Rick and Grace go to a symphony, she babysits and Libby starts to copy her. Grace gets upset with Libby, which upsets Amy too. Rick sides with his daughter and asks Grace to stay out of it. Nadine then points out that Amy is trying to split them up. Grace then confronts Amy and asks her to stop it.
62	14	"No Help Wanted"	Michael Lessac	Stevie Ray Fromstein	January 10, 1996	20.8
Grace wants Quentin to move to the basement and wants Patrick to move-in with Libby, so that she can have her room back. Evie arrives announcing that she is married to a rich man. Grace's landlord asks for $500 to fix up the basement, but she has no money. When Evie offers to help, she gets upset and starts a fight. When Rick offers to pay, she starts a fight with him too. She starts fixing the basement on her own. Rick arrives and apologizes. He then offers to help with building the basement. She then makes up with Evie too. Russell is upset that his father stays out late every night. He is upset that he is not a part of it.
63	15	"Good Neighbor Sam"	Michael Lessac	Ric Swartzlander	January 24, 1996	22.1
A neighbor's son, Sam, starts hanging out at Grace's house and she finds he is escaping from a "perfect" mother. She tries to talk to his mother, Katherine, but it does not go well. Meanwhile, Wade discovers that his name has been engraved on a veterans' memorial. He tries his best to remove it as he thinks is a bad omen. Grace thinks that it is survivor guilt.
64	16	"Positively Hateful"	Michael Lessac	Tim Doyle	February 7, 1996	18.8
When the janitor at Libby's school is about to be fired for being HIV+, Grace wants to help him, but he is very hostile. Wade and Rick have no sympathy for him, but Nadine is on her side. She tries to defend him, but he is very nasty with her, and she ends up speaking against him. Quentin has got his first date and Grace wants Rick to teach him about going on a date. Russell also decides to help and gives Quentin some bad advice on kissing a girl. Rick sets him straight.
65	17	"Why Buy the Bull?"	Michael Lessac	Holly Hester	February 14, 1996	19.4
Due to a gas leak, Grace and her kids have to move in with Rick for a while. Rick asks Grace to move-in permanently. Before she can answer, Rick gets a call about more job cuts in her department. Later Rick learns that he is fired. When Grace tries to move back home, Rick accuses her of running away because he is jobless. She is angry of the implication. When Rick gets a job in Alaska, Grace is scared that he will move away. Rick turns his job down to be with Grace. Russell's dad, Floyd, decided to have lunch with Russell's ex-wife, Barbara. Barbara offers Floyd a job in her pharmacy and he uses it to get a raise from Russell, but it turns out that he was just hustling Russell.
66	18	"Love Thy Neighbor"	John Bowab	Geoffrey Miller	February 21, 1996	20.1
Grace's new neighbors are Afro-Americans (Matt and Bailey). Jean pulls a gun on them and Jimmy insults them, which makes everyone think that she is a racist. To clear the misunderstanding she decides to invite them to dinner. Jimmy takes Quentin to shave his head, against Grace's wishes. The dinner doesn't go as planned and it upsets Grace.
67	19	"Pregnant Pause"	Alan Myerson	Donald Beck	February 28, 1996	18.1
Nadine is finally pregnant. Wade and Nadine become obsessed with the baby and Grace feels left out. They even have a fight. She goes to the cafe (the one in Grace Under a Wig) to read her poetry alone and spends some time with Bailey (the new neighbor). Wade is very happy, and shares it with Floyd and Russell. Wade tries to patch up between Nadine and Grace.
68	20	"Broads for Broader Horizons"	Phil Ramuno	Sonya Gay Bourn	March 13, 1996	18.8
Grace takes a creative writing class and Wade takes a CPR class in the same building. She gets an assignment to write pretending to be a in-animate object. She writes it during work and at home, but is unable to finish it. Her teacher Stan Meadows criticizes everyone. Rick becomes Grace's baby sitter and the kids are getting ignored. She decides to quit, but Rick encourages her to go back. Stan criticizes her and she takes a stand. Libby is suddenly interested in Grace's bras. Russell starts going to Single Tall Women club to meet new women.
69	21	"Head Games"	John Bowab	Ric Swartzlander	March 20, 1996	17.0
Quentin tries to finish his book report by watching the movie. He tries to get Grace to write him a letter that he is sick, but she refuses. At school, he uses his bald head to create an impression that he is very ill and the treatment is making him very sick. When his teachers start giving him flowers and his class-mates write poems for him, Grace goes to school to clear up the misunderstanding, but the teacher refuses to accept the truth. Grandma Jean has a new beau, George, with an amazing past. She feels guilty and breaks up after a while. Grace takes her out to dinner along with Rick to meet George. Nadine is nauseous of Wade's natural body smell, so they buy a range of scents to make her feel better.
70	22	"Mr. Mullens' Opus"	Gary Halvorson	Stevie Ray Fromstein	April 3, 1996	18.9
Grace starts working on a crisis hotline for charity. She starts talking to a Ron regularly to stop him from drinking again. One night when he is particularly unhappy, she rushes to the bar to meet him, only to discover that he is the nasty janitor, Mr. Mullens. In the beginning he is very hostile, but later and tells her that his wife has thrown him out. Grace asks him to clean up and reunites him with his wife. Libby is asked to sell cookies for charity and she has a tough time. Quentin scratches Wade's car by mistake and Libby blackmails him. Quentin sells cookies for Libby. Russell and Floyd are in trouble and are sent to crisis hotline as community service.
71	23	"Take Me to Your Breeder"	Howard Murray	Paul J. Raley	May 1, 1996	18.1
The oil refinery has a toxic spill and all the employees are sent to the hospital. Rick babysits for the children and Quentin gives him a particularly bad time, as he is upset with Jimmy when he cancels their plans. When the situation is out of control, Grace rushes home. On the way, she hallucinates that aliens have abducted her and she meets her father. When Grace is late, Wade and Russell search for her and find her in her car. After she comes to her senses, she grounds Quentin for bad behavior.
72	24	"Guess Who's Not Coming to Lunch?"	Peter Baldwin	Danny Zuker	May 8, 1996	17.8
Jimmy's child support checks bounce again and there are money problems. She refuses to take money from Rick. To save money, she enrolls her kids for the free lunch program. Quentin and Libby are ashamed as the free lunch kids stand in a separate queue. Grace goes to their school to sort the issue and learns that Libby is having stomach aches. Grace finds out they are from a stress-related ulcer. She feels guilty and tries to keep Libby stress-free. She and Rick take her to a carnival. Quentin asks Rick for some money and buys sneakers. He also gets Russell and Floyd to take him to the carnival. Grace then talks to Libby and asks her to take it easy.
73	25	"You Go Girl"	John Bowab	Pat Bullard	May 15, 1996	17.4
Grace gets Rick a job in the oil refinery, working under John. John and the others are not too warm towards him. One night he gets drunk and proposes to Grace who is inclined to accept until she learns that his new job site is Alaska. She talks to the kids and Jimmy about it. Rick proposes to her again when he is sober and she turns him down. Rick leaves. Russell is invited to his detested ex-wife's wedding. His ex-wife is left at the altar at her wedding.

=== Season 4 (1996–97) ===
No. overall	No. in season	Title	Directed by	Written by	Original release date	Viewers (millions)
74	1	"This Sold House"	John Bowab	Holly Hester	September 18, 1996	19.27
After years of doing improvements on her rental house, Grace learns that her landlord is putting it on the market. Grace and Nadine attempt to discourage potential buyers, but the house is sold. When Libby's "pet" squirrel bites her, Wade, Russell and Floyd round up all the neighborhood squirrels so the culprit can be identified and tested for rabies. Libby is devastated to learn that the rabies test required killing the squirrel, and she tearfully "runs away" to the deserted, ramshackle house across the street. Grace follows her there to console her, and after seeing the inside of the house, decides to buy it and fix it up.
75	2	"Neither a Borrower nor a Roofer Be"	John Bowab	J.J. Wall	September 25, 1996	17.83
When Russell's ex-wife Barbara shows up with her current boy-toy in tow and says she's dragging Russell back to court to have her alimony payments raised, Russell thinks he's doomed, but Grace says they should investigate Barbara's finances and Russell should take a stand in the name of working women everywhere. At the hearing, Grace reveals that Barbara owns a condominium complex that she hadn't reported, and the arbitrator orders Barbara to return the alimony she had fraudulently received from Russell, with one-third due immediately. Jean offers Grace a loan to fix up the house and, although she claims to have an extremely busy social life with her many friends, even suggests she could move in to help with expenses. (Grace later learns that the friends Jean claims to be spending time with are really the names of characters in a book Jean has been reading.) Grace bluntly turns her down on both offers, but when Floyd pressures Russell to offer Grace a $5,000 loan for a new roof, Russell hesitantly complies and Grace takes him up on it but later returns his check after Jean gives her the money and moves in.
76	3	"Quentin Returns"	John Bowab	Paul J. Raley	October 2, 1996	15.0
Russell asks Grace to be his date at the dance at the Victory Country Club where he's applying for membership; though Grace can't imagine why he'd want to associate with such a bunch of snobs, she agrees to attend the dance. Jimmy brings Quentin home after spending the summer with him in Ohio, and Quentin couldn't be angrier with Jimmy. When Grace learns that the reason for Quentin's anger is that he wanted to keep living with Jimmy, she talks to Jimmy who says he wants to be more of a father to the kids, so he's moving back to Victory. Wade goes to take the test to become a garbage collector and comes home with a job as a police officer. At the dance, Russell proves he's willing to go to any lengths to become a country club member.
77	4	"Grace and Sailor Bob"	John Bowab	Ric Swartzlander	October 9, 1996	13.2
Dougie moves into Grace's garage apartment, and it soon becomes apparent that he's a forty-two-year-old man who still needs his mother. Grace comes up against a brick wall in her attempts to communicate with Quentin. Libby gets a present from the sailor she's writing to as part of a class project and confesses to Grace that she's never told him her age. Grace says Libby will have to stop the deception, but it's too late as sailor Bob arrives in the Kelly's driveway. Grace is determined to straighten everything out until she gets a look at Bob. she then says she's Libby and goes on a date with Bob to a Star Trek convention, but Libby resents that she's lost her new friend to Grace, and Grace finally tells Bob what's really going on.
78	5	"Dating Buddies"	John Bowab	Matt Berry	October 23, 1996	13.9
Grace and Russell are so bored with their lives that they decide to go out on a pretend date. Grace and the guys at the refinery learn that they've been fired and rehired as independent contractors which means they'll get no benefits. The guys decide to stage a group protest on the decision. they don't get their benefits back, but they do get free coffee. On her pretend date, Grace meets Rob, a very attractive man who she thinks would be great for cheap, meaningless sex, and agrees to go out with him, but when he comes to pick her up she discovers he's far too intelligent to use as a sex object, so they just go for coffee. Wade and Nadine go back to the lakeside cottage where they spent their honeymoon, but all they do is go fishing.
79	6	"The Ghost and Mrs. Kelly"	John Bowab	David Nichols	October 30, 1996	17.48
Grace finds some of Mrs. Walker's old dresses and tells Libby she can use one of them for a Halloween costume. Jean's chairlift suddenly stops working, Wade agrees to have a look at the wiring in the house, but Libby says that Mrs. Walker's ghost, who she claims to have seen around the house, probably has something to do with the problem. Grace meets Tom at a Halloween party and then learns that he is the Reverend Maxwell from Jean's church-the minister that Jean's always raving about. Tom Maxwell stops buy and asks Grace out on a date; she accepts and they have a terrific evening and a great conversation in which Grace encourages Tom to have the courage to pursue his dreams. Patrick tells Grace that there's a ghost outside, and an unbelieving Grace gives him a water pistol and tells him to squirt the ghost, but when she and Libby find a warm pie in the backyard and no one else is around, even Grace begins to wonder.
80	7	"Road to Nowhere"	John Bowab	Donald Beck	November 6, 1996	17.25
Grace and Nadine reminisce about a road trip to see an Earth, Wind, and Fire concert after they receive invitations to their class reunion. Wade arrests Russell. Earth, Wind, and Fire make guest appearance and performance.
81	8	"Redeeming Jimmy"	John Bowab	Stevie Ray Fromstein	November 13, 1996	17.0
Jimmy's back in town to stay, and, on Grace's recommendation, he gets a job at the refinery, but his first day is a disaster, and Nadine and Wade say she shouldn't jeopardize her job for someone who used to treat her so badly; Grace, however, says that Jimmy's a different person than he was when they were married and he deserves to make a fresh start. Quentin goes to Jimmy for advice on dating, and he suggests that Quentin go on a practice date with a friend before asking out the girl he really likes. Grace goes to the motel where Jimmy's staying and finds Jean there with her son. Jimmy's depressed and thinks he'll lose his job (in reality, Grace's co-workers have been sabotaging him as revenge for the way he used to treat Grace) but he says he'll never leave his kids again. Jean reproaches Grace for all the "lies" she told about Jimmy abusing her, but Jimmy makes Jean face the fact that the things Grace said were true. Grace is livid when she hears about Jimmy's advice to Quentin.
82	9	"The Show-Me State"	John Bowab	Holly Hester	November 20, 1996	18.78
When Libby's poem wins the "Why I Love My State" contest, Grace, Nadine and Libby go to New York for the national competition. Rick follows Grace to New York to tell her that he's about to get married but will call it off if she still has feelings for him. Libby meets a cute boy who's also a contestant and tells Grace she wants him to win; Grace's tells her she's disappointed that Libby would lose her competitive spirit for the sake of a boy's approval. And Grace tells Rick that she still loves him but that their feelings for each other apparently aren't enough for them to have a life together. They regretfully part, unsure if they'll ever see each other again.
83	10	"Fire Music"	John Bowab	J.J. Wall	November 27, 1996	14.9
Grace, Libby and Nadine are still in New York, and Grace is obsessing that she's somehow failed to make this the perfect trip for Libby. Back in Victory, Russell has taken over babysitting chores, and, though he's wary of Quentin, it's Patrick who inflicts the torture. When Grace accidentally locks herself along with Libby and Nadine out on their hotel room balcony, Terry, a handsome fireman, comes to their rescue, but Grace is irritated by his condescending attitude toward out-of-towners. Later, at a jazz club Terry recommended, Grace is surprised to see him on-stage performing. Grace and Terry spend the evening together at his place where Grace meets Terry's son Robby who's just been dropped off by Terry's ex-wife. Grace marvels at how much she and Terry have in common but thinks that starting a long-distance relationship after just having her heart broken by Rick would be insane.
84	11	"Grace Tests Out"	John Bowab	Sid Youngers	December 4, 1996	14.9
With Grace at work all day and taking college classes at night, the kids are a little resentful that she's away so much and let Grace know it, and when she learns that the refinery will no longer pay for her classes it's the last straw. She knows she has no way to pay for her education, so when she learns that she can take a proficiency test to get many of the credits she needs, she's faced with a dilemma. She's scheduled to work the day of the test, and no one can switch with her, so it's her education or her dead-end job. Her co-workers remind her that she really needs her job--her children are depending on her, but the kids say they'll support whatever decision she makes. Grace actually shows up for work the day of the test, but a conversation with her boss, John Shirley, convinces her that she has do what she knows is the right thing and quit her job.
85	12	"A Holly Jolly Christmas"	John Bowab	Ric Swartzlander	December 18, 1996	14.4
Holiday festivities are underway in the Kelly household with Jean making her famous punch loaf to Grace's dismay and Jimmy's delight. Floyd is so much in the holiday spirit that he's giving away the entire inventory at the pharmacy, and an exasperated Russell decides to get rid of him by sending him on a cruise. Grace gets suspicious of Quentin's mellow mood and at first thinks that he's been drinking beer with his friends. When it dawns on her that he's been smoking pot, she fears that she's about to see him repeating all her teenage mistakes and decides that "tough love" is the only way to handle the situation.
86	13	"Matthew's Old Lady"	John Bowab	Story by : Nancy Hernandez and David Nichols; Teleplay by : David Nichols	January 8, 1997	13.53
When Matthew shows up at Grace's and announces he's about to marry Joan, a woman old enough to be his mother who also happens to be pregnant, Grace tries to keep her cool, especially when Matthew tells her his adoptive mother has no objections. But when Grace speaks to Emily, she learns that the only reason she didn't object was that Matthew seemed so adamant about marrying this woman. As the wedding day gets nearer, Joan confesses to Grace that although she definitely wants the baby, she doesn't want to marry Matthew in spite of how determined he seems to go through with the marriage. When Grace confronts Matthew about Joan's feelings, Matthew says he wants to marry Joan because he won't abandon this child. Grace understands that Matthew feels on some level that he himself was abandoned by her, and she tells him that he can still be very much a part of the baby's life without marrying the baby's mother.
87	14	"Grace of Wrath"	David Trainer	Mike Larson	January 15, 1997	14.39
Grace is going crazy trying to finish her paper on The Grapes of Wrath, and she keeps reminding Quentin that he also has a book report that's due. When Martha, one of Grace's classmates, says she's apartment hunting, Grace jumps at the chance to have her as a tenant. Martha moves in with her parrot, Ignatius, and Libby and Quentin are both charmed by her. Even Jean thinks she's great, but Wade says he thinks he's met her before but just can't place her until he sees the parrot and realizes that Martha is a stripper that he knows from patrolling the strip club where she works. Grace has no problem with Martha's profession and admires her efforts to continue her education. Grace encounters Mrs. Sheffield who tells her she's given Quentin a C+ on his "Grapes of Wrath" book report, and Grace confronts Quentin about stealing her work. When Martha drops out of school and moves back to St. Louis without even saying goodbye to the kids, Grace feels Martha has let both them and her down again.
88	15	"Wade's Partner"	Phil Ramuno	Paul J. Raley	January 29, 1997	13.25
Libby reminds Grace of their deal that if she could keep her goldfish alive for six months, Grace would buy her a dog. Tomorrow, Libby tells Grace, Fishy Fishman will be six months old, and a deal's a deal. Grace is willing to do anything in her power to convince Libby that a dog isn't a good idea. Wade drops by to introduce Ted, his new partner. Grace tells Russell about Fishy Fishman's upcoming birthday, and Russell says a lot can happen overnight, but Grace warns him not to try anything. Wade and Ted return to Grace's and want to see Quentin; some kids climbed the fence of the Victory Country Club the previous night, went skinny-dipping in the pool, put lipstick on a statue of Ben Hogan and made off with some very expensive golf clubs. Against Wade's wishes, Ted insists on taking Quentin in and booking him unless he's willing to rat on his friends. At first Grace gives Wade a hard time until she finds out this isn't his idea.
89	16	"Pills"	Alan Myerson	Steive Ray Formstien	February 5, 1997	12.26
Russell thinks all his friends are being disloyal because they're shopping at the new chain store pharmacy that's opened in the neighborhood. Libby is so involved in planning her birthday party that it's become an obsession, while Quentin is so eager to get a driver's license that he's letting Wade, Russell and even Jean give him driving lessons. Grace's back problems have gotten so bad that even Stevie Ray at the bar notices that she's in pain. She's taking more and more pills and is falling asleep so much that at one point Libby has trouble getting her to wake up. Nadine, Wade, Russell and Jean do a sort of intervention, and Grace reacts angrily and defensively. But when she realizes that Jake, the guy at the bar who's supported her in her pill consumption, is not a shoe salesman as she thought but really a drug dealer, she's so disgusted that she calls Jimmy and tells him she has a problem. Jimmy is completely supportive and promises to be there for her as she works through her problem
90	17	"Waiting for Peugeot"	David Trainer	Matt Berry	February 12, 1997	12.41
Grace tells Quentin that he can't get a driver's license until he improves his grades just as Jimmy arrives driving a 1969 red GTO and announces that he bought the car for Quentin using Quentin's college fund to pay for it. Grace insists that Jimmy has to return the car and get the money back, but Jimmy suggests that maybe Quentin isn't really cut out for college. Quentin says he'll keep a straight A average if Grace will let him keep the car, but Grace won't hear of it. At the car lot Grace encounters Rob, a guy she's dated sporadically, and learns that he's the one that sold Jimmy the car; Rob agrees to resell the car, and Grace agrees to go out with him again. Rob tells Grace he hopes their relationship can move to another level, beyond a mere physical relationship to a committed one. Grace doesn't know how to respond; she tells Nadine she's not sure she wants anything more than what they already have--after all she doesn't have a great track record, but Rob is a smart, multi-faceted guy.
91	18	"Birthin' Babies"	David Trainer	Donald Beck	February 19, 1997	12.11
Grace brings Rob home to meet her kids just as Nadine announces that the baby's on its way. Wade's off on an undercover assignment so Grace has to take her to the hospital, leaving Rob alone with Libby and Patrick. Grace and Nadine reminisce about how Nadine was always around when Grace delivered all her kids. Grace flashes back to how Jimmy stole hundreds of dollars' worth of toys as presents for Quentin and is caught by the police and how she had to take baby Quentin to the county jail so his dad could see him for the first time. Grace and Nadine arrive at the hospital, and Wade is still nowhere to be found; Grace takes over as Nadine's Lamaze coach. Grace flashes back to when Libby was born and Nadine took her to the hospital because Jimmy wanted to go hunting. Grace tries to coach Nadine, who's in great pain, as Grace remembers when Patrick was born, and again it's Nadine who's with her, not Jimmy. On the way to the delivery room Nadine says she's changed her mind about having this baby with Grace.
92	19	"Vegas"	David Trainer	Holly Hester	February 26, 1997	14.80
When Grace isn't invited to Rob's weekend getaway because he has made plans with someone else, Grace decides to go to Vegas for the weekend with Jean. Jean wins it big on the slots and Grace finds out she is only lucky for other people and not herself.
93	20	"Jimmy Moves In"	David Trainer	Geoffrey Miller	March 12, 1997	11.02
Grace is having a bad set of renters and asks Jimmy to re-model her garage. He decorates it with dead animal heads. When the building inspector tells Grace that it's illegal to rent out the garage, Jimmy volunteers to move in. Grace isn't too happy and thinks of even having Floyd, but his antics scare her. Jimmy gives some bad advice to Quentin and takes the training wheel off Patrick's bike. Grace is initially angry, but it turns out better and asks Jimmy to move in.
94	21	"Quentin Gets His Gun"	Phil Rumano	Ric Swartzlander	March 26, 1997	10.90
Grace has to work and she is running out of sitters. She asks Quentin to watch his siblings, instead of going on a date. Libby leaves the house and goes to the bar to meet Grace, while under Quentin's watch. Grace gets angry and asks him to be responsible. Later that night, he hears a noise and uses his dad's gun on the intruder, which happens to be Wade checking on them. He isn't hurt, but Grace is very angry. Jimmy tries to fix up an old car and flip it. Due to all these activities in Grace's house, Sam's dad does not want Sam going there.
95	22	"Sam's Dad"	David Trainer	Joan Binder Weiss & David Weiss	April 9, 1997	10.32
Grace goes to Libby's and Sam's school with Sam's dad. They have a great time. He starts coming over often and even helps with her studies. Rob is jealous of their friendship. Sam's mother is coming out of her depression and Sam's dad isn't handling it too well. Jean starts getting forgetful, so Grace wants her to see a doctor. Both Jimmy and Jean are against it, but Grace takes her anyway and gets her medicine.
96	23	"Grace Graduates"	David Trainer	Stephanie Philips	April 30, 1997	16.93
Grace has finally graduated and has to give a speech. She tries to write a great speech, but she struggles. Grace starts looking for a new job and has many bad interviews. Quentin is not too keen on college and refuses to write for a GED. Libby finds Grace's old yearbook. Grace and Nadine look at it and think of old times.
97	24	"Rob vs. Jimmy"	Ron Moseley	Bryan Moore	May 6, 1997	13.59
Rob wants to get serious with Grace and starts to bond with the kids. He helps them to get Grace her 39th birthday gifts and throw her a surprise party. He also helps Libby with school work. Jimmy feels neglected and left out. Rob realizes it and backs off. Wade is working a lot and has very little time for the baby and Nadine. Nadine is upset and does not allow him near the baby.
98	25	"Grace's New Job"	David Trainer	Sid Youngers	May 7, 1997	10.47
Grace gets a new job at an advertising company, but she isn't too happy with the co-workers and her work. But there she gets another job offer at an agency in St. Louis. She talks to her family and decides to take the job. She moves to St. Louis leaving her kids with Jean. Wade and Jimmy promise to help out.

=== Season 5 (1997–98) ===
No. overall	No. in season	Title	Directed by	Written by	Original release date	Viewers (millions)
99	1	"Smells Like Victory"	Gary Halvorson	Tom Straw	November 25, 1997	11.29
Grace arrives home very late from her job in St. Louis and finds the kids still up, the house in disarray, Jean asleep on the sofa and Libby cleaning the kitchen. The next day Grace gets an unexpected work assignment and Libby must cancel her plans to go to the bookstore with Grace. Later they all go to a construction site where a bridge is being built, to see the large tractors. At the site, they're approached by an African American man who Jean thinks is about to mug them, but he's D.C., the owner of the company that's building the bridge. They talk briefly, and when Patrick gets his arm caught in a piece of equipment, D.C. rescues him and gives Grace some grief about working out of town and not being around for her kids. On Sunday night, as Grace is preparing to leave for St. Louis, she realizes it's getting more and more difficult for her to leave her family. When everyone gets up in the morning, Grace is there cooking breakfast. She's quit her job.
100	2	"Grace Under Construction"	James Hampton	Matt Ember	December 2, 1997	12.39
Grace is in search of a job and Libby is worried that they're going to be poor again. Russell knows D.C. is looking for an assistant and suggests that he hire Grace, but D.C. says Grace talks too much and would give him attitude. He relents and offers Grace the job. She arrives at work and immediately begins making suggestions. D.C. says he'd like her to do what she was hired for and do it quietly. He's afraid she'll never be able to keep her mouth shut and thinks he'll probably have to fire her before the end of the day. But when D. C. realizes that Grace has saved the company several hundred dollars by effectively dealing with a stubborn delivery man, he says she can hang around for a while. Wade tells Grace that he and Nadine have been fighting over the phone since she's been at her mother's. Grace suggests that he put his feelings in writing, but he misunderstands and sends an angry letter to Nadine. Grace introduces Wade to Dot, who tells him he needs a haircut.
101	3	"Don't Ask, Don't Tell"	Phil Ramuno	Mark Solomon	December 9, 1997	10.26
Wade's back from Colorado and tells Grace that he and Nadine are splitting up. He also tells her he's heard that some kids were partying down by the quarry, and it's possible Quentin may have been there. Libby tells Grace that Quentin has a new girlfriend. When Grace questions Quentin, he volunteers nothing and accuses her of not trusting him. Grace tells Quentin she'll try to back off a bit, but he'll have to meet her halfway. He admits that he and his girlfriend Laurie stopped by the party, but they didn't drink and they're not having sex. Grace is greatly relieved until Russell accidentally reveals that Quentin's been in the pharmacy buying condoms. When Grace confronts Quentin, he's on the defensive and demands his privacy. She tells him she just wants to be there for him and give him the benefit of some life lessons she's learned.
102	4	"Mother Christmas"	Ron Moseley	Stephanie Phillips	December 16, 1997	10.42
Louise, Grace's mom, arrives for the holidays, surprising everyone. Louise has definite ideas about how little girls are to be brought up and she disapproves of Libby's tomboy behavior. Her mission is to turn Libby into a demure young lady, and she starts with a present to Libby of ballet slippers. Grace has no use for Louise's attempts to mold Libby into the lady that Grace never was. She likes the strong, independent Libby and doesn't want her to change. And Libby is feeling quite uncomfortable from all the pressure she's getting from her grandmother. Meanwhile, Russell is selling "Photos With Santa" at the pharmacy with Quentin doing the photography, but Russell's disappointed when Dot refuses to pose in a silly elf costume
103	5	"A River Runs Through Him"	David Trainer	Paul J. Raley	December 23, 1997	8.41
Jean is upset, complaining a new bridge will cut off her late husband Emmet's grave's view of the river, so Grace suggests she move the gravesite. Jimmy and Quentin attempt to do that and Russell takes Dot to the gambling boat, but won't gamble.
104	6	"Finders Keepers"	David Trainer	Ed Yeager	December 23, 1997	11.05
Libby wants to go to Washington on a class trip, but Grace can't afford to send her. A tornado has hit Victory and there has been much destruction: the church steeple blew off, and an armored car from the casino took a direct hit and money flew all over town. After the storm, Quentin finds a cloth bag by the house with two-hundred-thousand-dollars in it. Everyone has an idea about how they could use the money, but Grace makes it clear that they'll be returning it. The casino management calls a press conference to thank the Kelly family for returning the money, but when Grace hands over the bag, twenty-thousand-dollars is missing. Grace is interrogated for hours. She's afraid Jimmy took the money, and Wade makes her furious by hinting that maybe she took it herself. But when Grace finds the missing money in the cookie jar, Jean confesses she took the money to help the church rebuild. As Grace returns the rest of the money, she cleverly tells a TV reporter that the casino has offered to pay for the church.
105	7	"Riverboat Queen"	James Hampton	Nick LeRose	December 30, 1997	11.15
D.C. has a chance to bid on a hotel job for one of the biggest developers in the Midwest. Grace tells him he's going to have to make an extra effort to schmooze the guy and make him feel at ease, even though it isn't D.C.'s style. D.C. tells Grace she should join them for dinner. At dinner with Davis Walsh, the developer, things are a bit awkward, but Davis seems attracted to Grace. Davis is paged and excuses himself, and D.C. tells Grace she should play up to Davis for the sake of their getting the job. Grace immediately learns that it's actually D.C. that Davis is attracted to. When Davis again leave the table, Grace tells D.C. that he's the one who's going to have to do a little flirting. Russell has good feelings about his new relationship with Dot, who has agreed to a second date with him. At dinner with Russell, Dot tells him she likes being with him but wants things to move slowly. Russell agrees, but he's busted when a strolling hypnotist puts him under and he tells the whole story.
106	8	"The Victory Tree"	David Trainer	Mark Legan	December 30, 1997	13.54
Libby visits the bridge construction site on a field trip and discovers that the Victory Tree that holds a significant place in the town's history is to be cut down. She's very upset, so Grace suggests she start a letter writing campaign to save the tree. Libby even stages a demonstration at the site, which makes D.C. irate that construction has been halted. He thinks the whole thing is Grace's fault because she's the one who suggested the field trip. Libby's amazed that Grace doesn't share her concern for the tree; but Grace tells her the bridge is important too, both for the town and for their family. A town meeting is called to discuss the fate of the tree. When D.C. tells everyone that the bridge represents thirty- million-dollars in revenue for the town, it's certain that the Victory Tree is doomed, but Grace demands that Libby also be allowed to have her say. Also, Russell has expanded his store and has built a fancy soda fountain.
107	9	"Grace Under-funded"	David Trainer	Tom Reeder	January 6, 1998	14.09
Grace buys some new clothes for the first time in years and the next day learns that her paycheck will be late because D.C. is having trouble getting his payroll money from the government. On the way home from work, Grace's car catches fire, and will need a couple thousand-dollar's worth of repair. Jean volunteers to loan her the money, but the bank tells Jean that her account, which is also in Jimmy's name, has insufficient funds. There is a two-thousand-dollar withdrawal that Jean knows nothing about. When Grace and Jean investigate, they learn that Jimmy took the money to purchase swans, which he'd been persuaded were going to be the next food craze. Not knowing that swans fly, he built a pen with no top, and the swans flew away along with Jean's money. Meanwhile, a burglar has been hitting pharmacies in Victory, and Wade persuades Russell to let him set up a stake-out. And Grace and D.C. are forced to go to the federal building in St. Louis to take on the bureaucrats to get the money.
108	10	"Digging Up the Dirt"	Ron Moseley	David Kemkey & Keith Leslie	January 13, 1998	14.34
When D.C. and Grace have a meeting in a motel with an equipment supplier, gossip that they're having an affair flies around Victory. Jean gets the news at the fabric store, Libby hears it while going door to door for the school candy sale, and Wade hears the rumor that D.C. was at a motel with a prostitute. D.C. is upset that the rumors will cause Grace's co-workers to suspect favoritism, but Grace refuses to let the situation bother her. She flippantly starts a couple of stories of her own - that Russell's adopted, that a certain teacher in town has posed for a nudie magazine, and that the Kellys' neighbor Earl has been burying bodies in the backyard. Things backfire on Grace when it's revealed that Russell is adopted but Floyd has never gotten around to telling him. Mrs. Sheffield sheepishly reveals to Grace that she may be the teacher in question; she did pose, but it was as an underwear model in the Sears catalogue. The police arrive at Earl's and dig up his backyard where he's been burying dead animals.
109	11	"Fire in the Hole"	Phil Ramuno	Paul J. Raley	January 20, 1998	15.81
Wade shows up with Dan Gabriel, his old commanding officer in Vietnam, who's now a covert operations/demolition expert. Dan and Grace begin a verbal sparring match almost immediately. He's a warrior and a hard-core conservative, and Grace hates everything he stands for. Later, Dan has no trouble winning over Jean, and he talks to Libby about how to use psychological intimidation to defend herself against a bully who put gum in her hair. An angry Grace tells Dan to keep himself and his violent approach to life away from her kids, but their conversation ends in a passionate kiss. Grace is horrified that she's madly attracted to a guy she hates, and it's obvious that Dan's equally attracted. But Dan dives into the river to do some demolition work for D.C. and doesn't come back out. Everyone assumes he's dead, but later, Dan, very much alive, appears at Grace's and tells her he faked his death because he needs to disappear for a while, but he'll be back to see her.
110	12	"Fall from Grace"	James Hampton & Howard Murray	Ben Gramin & Sonya Gay Bourn	February 3, 1998	14.36
At the construction site, Grace feels the resentment of her co-worker, Derrick, who wanted the job Grace has. Grace, who has asked D.C. for more responsibilities, is surprised when her old pal Vic from the oil refinery shows up and says he's desperate for a job. D.C. leaves the decision to Grace, who's on the spot because she knows that Vic is lazy. Feeling sorry for him, she tells him he can have the job, but warns him he can't let her down. Vic immediately begins to slack off and Derrick is smug that Grace has made a poor decision on hiring Vic. D.C. warns her that Vic better shape up or they'll both be out on the street, and points out that Vic is now up on a scaffold without a safety harness eating his lunch, even though lunch hour is long over. He tells Grace to go up and have Vic come down. Grace has vertigo but reluctantly goes after Vic. She orders him to put on a harness and come down and as he does, he falls to the ground and is rushed to the emergency room.
111	13	"Grace Under Class"	James Hampton	Lois Bromfield	February 10, 1998	12.78
Grace stops by the pharmacy while Quentin's working at the soda fountain. Quentin's girlfriend Laurie is there, and Grace meets her for the first time. She also sees the expensive backpack Laurie has bought Quentin. Laurie has also bought Quentin expensive pants and a new camera. At home, Grace announces she's finally paid off her credit card and they're going to celebrate with a shrimp dinner. Quentin says to count him out since he's having dinner at the country club with Laurie and her parents. Grace voices her disapproval, and Quentin says she's just jealous that Laurie's family can buy him things that she can't. Grace meets Bev, Laurie's mother, and discovers that they agree about the presents to Quentin, and also find they have a lot in common. Maxine, a newly divorced woman, makes a pass at Russell at the pharmacy, and he's tempted, but instead he confesses to Dot that he's been thinking about someone else and feels guilty. Libby interviews D.C. for her school newspaper.
112	14	"Down in the Boondocks"	Gary Halvorson	Janet Leahy	February 17, 1998	10.47
At the pharmacy, Russell and D.C. get into a disagreement about a watch D.C. tries on that breaks before he has a chance to buy it. Grace runs into Bev, Quentin's girlfriend's mother, at the pharmacy. Bev tells her she's feeling suffocated in her marriage; being rich isn't that great. Grace has a hard time relating to Bev's problems. Grace is at home being driven crazy by Libby's trumpet practicing when Bev comes by and announces she'd like to stay with Grace for a while to get back to her middle-class roots. Grace agrees to let her, though Quentin's upset to have to live under the same roof with his girlfriend's mother. It soon becomes clear that Bev is having as much trouble adapting to life at the Kellys' as they are having her there. She takes two showers in the morning and depletes all the hot water and uses four towels a day. Grace thinks Bev could solve all her problems with an honest talk with her husband, but Bev disagrees. Grace takes Bev out to a bar.
