= Brink! =

- Film poster
- Genre: Drama; Family; Sport
- Written by: Jeff Schechter
- Directed by: Greg Beeman
- Starring: Erik von Detten; Sam Horrigan; Christina Vidal; Robin Riker; Geoffrey Blake; David Graf
- Theme music composer: J. Peter Robinson
- Country of origin: United States
- Original language: English

Production
- Executive producer: David Hoberman
- Producer: Bernadette Caulfield
- Cinematography: Rodney Charters
- Editor: Lee Haxall
- Running time: 99 minutes
- Production companies: Fake-Reel Films; Mandeville Films

Original release
- Network: Disney Channel
- Release: August 29, 1998

Related
- You Lucky Dog; Halloweentown

Brink! is a 1998 American sports drama film that depicts the sport of aggressive inline skating. Written by Jeff Schechter and directed by Greg Beeman, the film stars Erik von Detten as Andy "Brink" Brinker, a high school inline skater who joins a group of skaters to help his financially troubled family. The plot adapts and updates the 1865 novel Hans Brinker, or The Silver Skates by Mary Mapes Dodge. The film was released as the third Disney Channel Original Movie.

== Plot ==
Andy "Brink" Brinker and his in-line skating best friends—Peter, Jordy, and Gabriella—who call themselves "Soul-Skaters" (they skate for the fun of it, not for the money), clash with a semi-professional skating team, Team X-Bladz—led by Val—with whom they attend high school in southern California.

On the first day of school, the Soul-Skaters and Team X-Bladz race on school grounds. Boomer, a skater for Team X-Bladz, is seriously injured during the race, causing Brink to stop mid-race to help him. Brink and the other racers are caught and suspended. Brink learns that his family is in financial trouble; his father, Ralph, has been on disability for six months and is unsure if he will get his job back when he's well. Brink secretly goes against his beliefs and joins Team X-Bladz for $200 a week as a replacement for Boomer. Ralph didn't want his son to spend even more time skating, so he forbade him from taking the job. However, Brink disobeys him. Ralph, unaware that his son took the job, and since Brink had said he wanted to work, gets him a part-time job at Pup-N-Suds, a dog-grooming business. This, however, is a job that Jordy, Gabriella, and Peter are aware of because Brink had told them that he's working there. For a while, Brink manages to keep his other job in Team X-Bladz a secret from his family and friends by juggling school, both jobs, and practice with the Soul-Skaters. However, Jordy, Gabriella, and Peter discover the truth when they catch him skating for Team X-Bladz at an invitational prior to an upcoming local competition. Brink's friends feel he betrayed them and choose to ignore him upon discovering his alignment with Team X-Bladz.

Brink tries to rejoin the Soul Skaters, but is rebuffed. Val offers Brink a chance to rejoin X-Bladz, noting that the team won't hold his departure against him. While scouting the route for the downhill leg of the upcoming competition, The Soul-Skaters and Team X-Bladz agree to a downhill race, with Gabriella against Brink. During the race, Val sabotages the course by tossing gravel onto the road - but tells Brink to take a different route. Gabriella wipes out big and sustains cuts and bruises. Brink realizes what Val did.

Brink visits Gabriella at her house, and she calls him a sell-out. Ralph learns about the accident from Gabriella's mother, and Brink confesses that he took the job with X-Bladz despite being told not to. Ralph has a heart-to-heart with Brink and asks him why he didn't tell the family about it. Brink finally confesses his true reasons for joining Team X-Bladz and wanting to be a somebody in it. He admits that though he got what he wanted, it has gotten him into a mess. Brink mentions he has lost his friends and doesn't have fun skating with X-Bladz. Ralph reveals that although the family is in financial trouble, Brink should not skate for money and would rather skate for fun.

Inspired by his father, Brink confronts Val at the local boardwalk, quits Team X-Bladz, and returns the team gear (skates/helmet). Val tells Brink not to renege on his contractual obligations with Team X-Bladz. This leads to a heated argument between the boys, ending with Brink over-tossing a milkshake in Val's face. Val charges at Brink, but Boomer stops him and calls him a fool for not considering the consequences of his actions, especially after he has injured Gabriella. However, Brink doesn't point out his problem because of his stupidity. For preference, he assures him that he's not someone any other skaters want to hang out with. By the time he storms off the scene along with Boomer, he makes a bet with Val.

In the days before the competition, Brink makes up to his friends at the skate yard. After giving them new skates, Brink tells them of his plan to sponsor the team under the name "Team Pup 'N Suds". When questioned, Brink admits he got an advance from PupNSuds from his wages to pay for the skates. They forgive Brink and reconcile with him.

As friends once again, they compete with their families' support. In the end, it comes down to Brink and Val in the championship race. Throughout the downhill championship, Val continually attempts to shove Brink off the course. When Val crashes off the course, Brink returns to help him up. Val yanks Brink to the ground to try to get a head start, while ESPN cameras stream the interaction to onlookers. After getting up, with Val in the lead, Brink takes a shortcut to win the race.

Immediately after the race, while Val storms off, Team X-Bladz manager Jimmy, who saw Val's cheating and kicked him off the team, offers Brink the captain of Team X-Bladz, whose members reconcile with Brink, disgusted over their former leader's cheating. However, Brink declines. He happily rejoins the Soul Skaters and receives the trophy.

== Cast ==
- Erik von Detten as Andy "Brink" Brinker
- Sam Horrigan as Val Horrigan
- Christina Vidal as Gabriella Dellama
- Robin Riker as Maddie Brinker
- Geoffrey Blake as Jimmy
- Patrick Levis as Peter Calhoun
- Joey Simmrin as Arne "Worm"
- Asher Gold as Jordy
- Walter Emanuel Jones as "Boomer"
- Katie Volding as Kate Brinker
- David Graf as Ralph Brinker
- Kevin Clifford as Garbage Man

== Soundtracks ==
Original music composed by J. Peter Robinson, additional music by Phil Marshall

- "Give" by The Suicide Machines
- "Sooner or Later" by Fastball
- "Apology" by Clarissa
- "Come on Brink" by Mark Mason and Rick Allen

== Reception ==
In 2012, Complex ranked the film at number 1 on the magazine's list of the 25 best Disney Channel Original Movies (DCOMs). In December 2015, Dylan Kickham of Entertainment Weekly ranked Brink! at number four on a list of the top 30 DCOMs. Kickham wrote, "Along with the hilariously nostalgic lingo, Brink! earns its place in the pantheon of great DCOMs for mixing adrenaline, drama, and one-time Disney golden boy Erik von Detten." In March 2016, the film was ranked at number 37 on MTV's list of the best DCOMs, consisting of 99 films. In May 2016, Aubrey Page of Collider ranked each Disney Channel Original Movie released up to that point. Page ranked Brink! at number 17, writing, "It's been official pretty much since it aired: Brink! is a classic. And, it's potentially the best aggressive inline skating movie ever been committed to film – though it might also be the only one."

== Filming ==
"Brink!" was filmed in Los Angeles, California.

Scenes at the X-Blade Warehouse were filmed at the Skatelab Skatepark in Simi Valley, California. The down hill practice skate scenes were filmed in San Pedro. The skating competition was filmed at Zuma Beach in Malibu.

Actress Brie Larson auditioned for the role of Katie Brinker, which ultimately went to Katie Volding.
