= Worl-A-Girl =

American musical group

Worl-A-Girl is an American hip hop and R&B-influenced reggae group, formed in 1991. Founding vocalists Charmaine (Charmaine DaCosta), Miss Linda (Linda Scott?), Sabrina (Sabrina Cohen?) and Sensi (Angela Wilks?) released their first album in 1994. Charmaine left the group in 1995 to pursue a solo career as a gospel singer.

The group is perhaps best known for the single "Jamaican Bobsledding Chant" from the soundtrack for the movie, Cool Runnings.

== Partial discography ==
- "Jamaican Bobsledding Chant" (single; 1993)
- Worl-A-Girl (album; 1994)
- "No Gunshot" (single; 1994)
- "No Woman No Cry" (single; 1995)
- Party (album; 2000)
