= Sam Horrigan =

American film and television actor

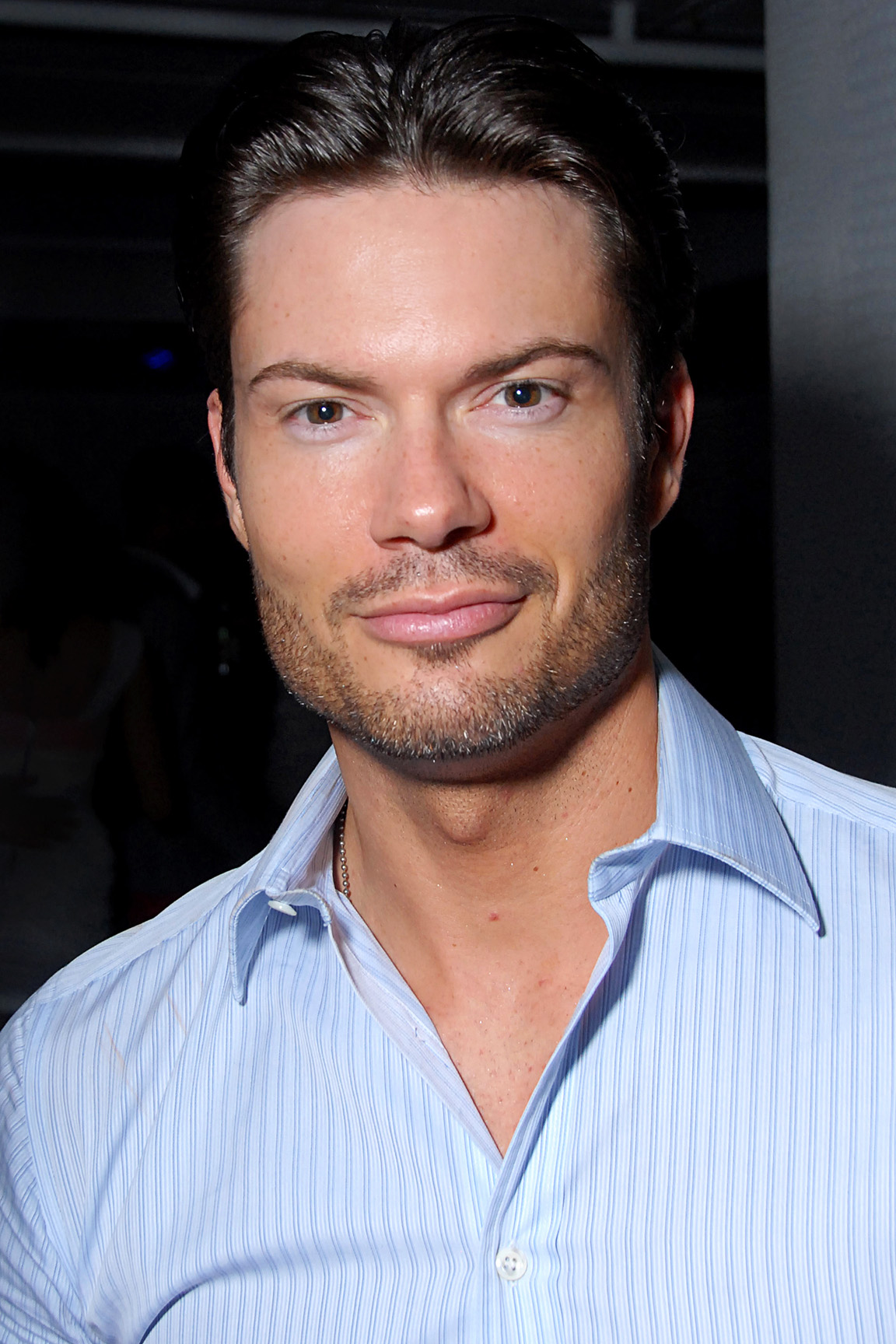
- Horrigan in 2012
- Born: Samuel Emmett Horrigan; August 23, 1981 (age 45); Sacramento County, California, U.S.
- Occupations: Film and television actor

Samuel Emmett Horrigan (born August 23, 1981) is an American film and television actor. He is best known for playing Quentin Kelly in the American sitcom television series Grace Under Fire and finishing runner-up on season 4 of Beauty and the Geek.

== Life and career ==
Horrigan was born in Sacramento County, California. He began his screen career in 1992, appearing in the television film What If. In 1993, he appeared in the ABC coming-of-age sitcom television series Boy Meets World. In 1994, he played Spike Hammersmith in the film Little Giants.

Later in his career, in 1996, Horrigan replaced Jon Paul Steuer, and he starred as Quentin Kelly in the ABC sitcom television series Grace Under Fire, starring along with Brett Butler, Dave Thomas, Julie White, Casey Sander and Walter Olkewicz. After the series ended in 1998, he guest-starred in television programs including Opposite Sex, Quintuplets, Desperate Housewives, CSI: Crime Scene Investigation and Grounded for Life, and played the recurring role of Pete in the ABC sitcom television series 8 Simple Rules. He also appeared in films such as Brink! (as Val), Children of the Dark, Accepted and Bar Starz.

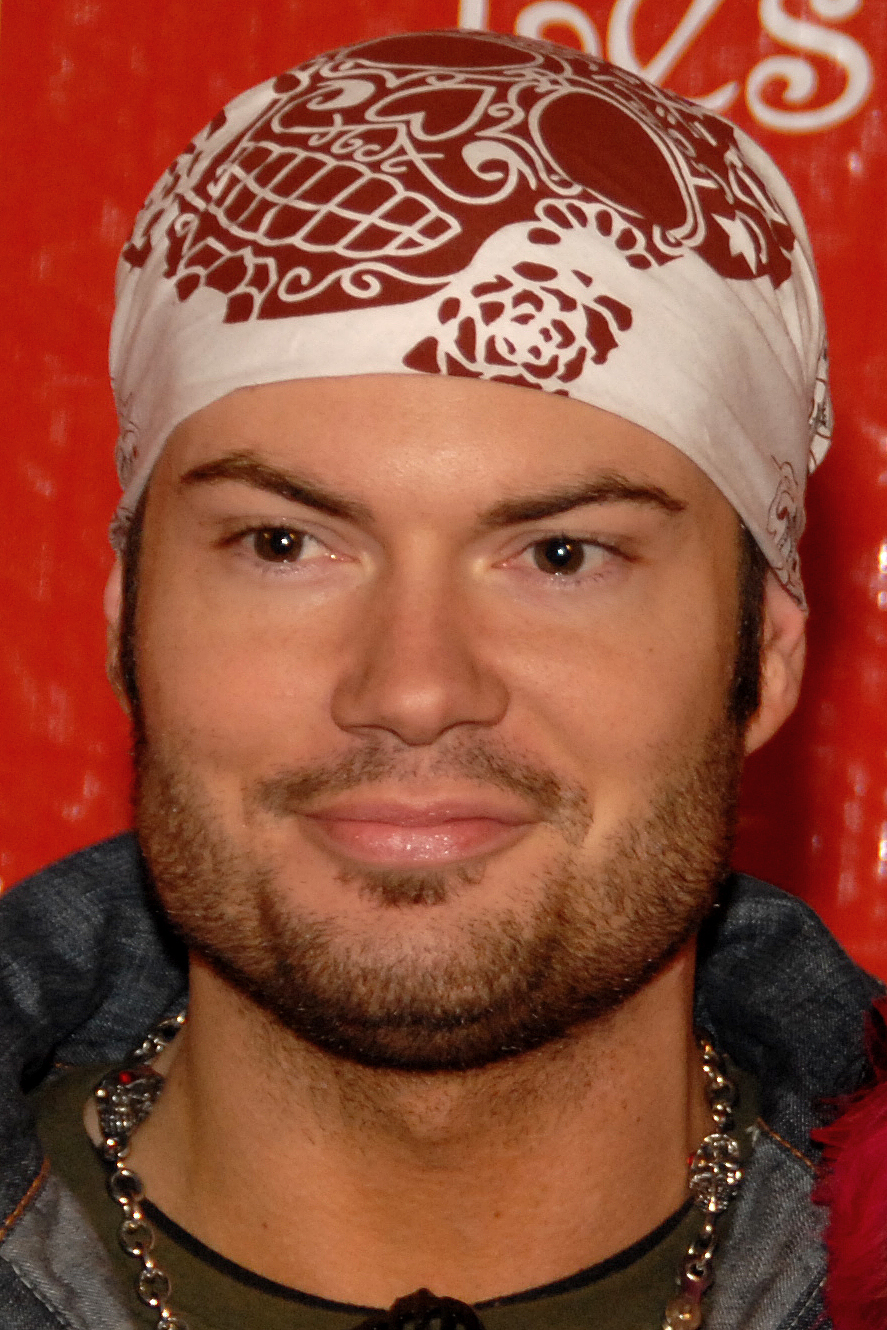
Horrigan in 2008

Horrigan retired from acting in 2016, last appearing in the ABC mockumentary sitcom television series Modern Family.
