= Michael O'Brien (musician) =

American Christian musician

- Born: Michael David O'Brien; August 23, 1964 (age 61); Miami, Florida, U.S.
- Origin: Nashville, Tennessee
- Genres: Pop rock; AOR; CCM
- Occupations: Singer; songwriter; worship leader
- Instruments: Piano; guitar
- Years active: 1990–present
- Label: Benson
- Website: michaelo.org

Michael David O'Brien (born August 23, 1964) is an American Christian musician and worship leader, who primarily performs Christian pop and contemporary worship music. He has released eight solo albums since 1990 and was a touring member of the Heritage Singers, before becoming a full-fledged member of NewSong in 1999.

== Early and personal life ==
Michael David O'Brien was born on August 23, 1964 in Miami, where he lived until he was 11 years old. He moved to Lafayette, Louisiana and got involved in music at Comeaux High School. After graduating he attended the University of Louisiana at Lafayette studying vocal performance. He worked as a bartender in several restaurants and lived with his sister Dana for a couple of years in his early twenties. He met his wife, Heidi, as a part of the singing group the Heritage Singers. They married on March 3, 1989 and in August 1989 they moved to Encinitas, California where Michael took a job as a young adult pastor at North Coast Christian Fellowship. Heidi worked there as well. They moved to Nashville in April 1991. He worked at the Cooker in the city as a waiter until 1993; he signed a songwriting deal with Meadowgreen Music. During that time, he sang with a group called Bash and played keyboards for Allies, Allison Durham and Twila Paris. Michael O'Brien signed a record deal with Benson Records in 1994 and recorded three albums with them. He was the lead singer of NewSong from 1999 until 2006 and has been a solo performer since then. He and his wife had four children. They live in Columbia, Tennessee and their son, Joseph O'Brien, took part in 2018 in season 13 of America's Got Talent.

== Career ==
O'Brien started his music recording career in 1990, releasing the album, Someone Needs to Tell Them, as an Indie project. His next album, Michael O'Brien, was released in 1995 with Benson Records. The third album, Conviction, came out in 1996 on Benson Records and he released, Godspeed, in 1998, also with Benson Records. His fifth studio album, Something About Us, was released in 2007, with Miracle Productions. The next album, Be Still My Soul, was released in 2010 and his first holiday album, Christ'mas, came out in 2013 on Miracle Productions. O'Brien's eighth album, Psalms, Hymns and Spiritual Songs, was released in 2015, with Miracle Productions and he released a project "Crown Him", in 2020.

== Discography ==
=== Studio albums ===
- Someone Needs to Tell Them (1990)
- Michael O'Brien (1995)
- Conviction (1996)
- Godspeed (1998)
- Signature Songs (2000)
- Something About Us (2007)
- Be Still My Soul (2010)
- Christ'mas (2013)
- Psalms, Hymns and Spiritual Songs (2015)
- Crown Him (2020)
- All I Have is Christ (2024)
- Ascending (2024)

=== Albums with NewSong ===
- Sheltering Tree (2000)
- The Christmas Shoes (2001)
- More Life (2003)
- Live Worship Rescue (2005)

=== Duet performances ===
- Nicole Mullen
- Larnelle Harris
- Lenny Leblanc
- Steve Green
- Dallas Holm
- David Meece
- Natalie Grant
- Russ Lee
- Charles Billingsly
- Meghan Lambert
- Mikey OBrien Jr.
- Timmy O’Brien
- Joseph O’Brien (son)
