= Little Giants =

1994 American family sports comedy film

- Theatrical release poster
- Directed by: Duwayne Dunham
- Screenplay by: James Ferguson; Robert Shallcross; Tommy Swerdlow; Michael Goldberg
- Story by: James Ferguson; Robert Shallcross
- Produced by: Arne Schmidt
- Starring: Rick Moranis; Ed O'Neill; John Madden
- Cinematography: Janusz Kamiński
- Edited by: Donn Cambern
- Music by: John Debney
- Production company: Amblin Entertainment
- Distributed by: Warner Bros.
- Release date: October 14, 1994
- Running time: 106 minutes
- Language: English
- Budget: $20 million
- Box office: $19.3 million

Little Giants is a 1994 American family sports comedy film directed by Duwayne Dunham and written by James Ferguson, Robert Shallcross, Tommy Swerdlow, Michael Goldberg from the story by Ferguson and Robert Shallcross. The film stars Rick Moranis and Ed O'Neill as Danny and Kevin O'Shea, two brothers living in an Ohio town who coach rival Pee-Wee Football teams. It also featured John Madden making his feature film debut as himself. The film was produced by Amblin Entertainment and distributed by Warner Bros. under their Warner Bros. Family Entertainment label.

== Plot ==
In the town of Urbania, Ohio, (Note: This town is fictional.) Kevin O'Shea, a Heisman Trophy winner and local sports hero, coaches the "Pee-Wee Cowboys" football team. Despite being the best player, Kevin's niece Becky, nicknamed Icebox, is cut during try outs solely because she is a girl. Her less-talented friends, Rashid Hanon, Tad Simpson, and Rudy Zolteck are cut as well. After being ridiculed by the players who made the team, Becky convinces her dad Danny, Kevin's younger brother, to coach a new pee-wee team of their own.

Danny eventually accepts in an attempt to show Urbania that Kevin is not invincible, and that there is another O'Shea in town capable of winning. There is a "one town, one team" rule enforced by the Pee-Wee Football League, so, with the support of the locals, the brothers decide to have a playoff game to determine the lone team that will represent Urbania. Alongside Becky and her friends, Danny gathers other children that had not been given a chance, and dubs the team the "Little Giants." One such player, strong-armed quarterback Junior Floyd, is the son of Danny's childhood crush, Patty Floyd.

Two old-timers, Orville and Wilbur, encourage the rivalry between Danny and Kevin, reporting to them that a new star player, Spike Hammersmith, has just moved to Urbania. Danny recruits him by tricking his father Mike into believing that he is the famous "Coach O'Shea". However, Spike refuses to play on a team with a girl. The deception is later discovered and he switches over to Kevin's team. Kevin also encourages his daughter Debbie to become a cheerleader and tells Becky that a quarterback will want to date a cheerleader, not a teammate. She chooses to quit the Giants and pursue cheerleading, believing that it would be her best chance to win over Junior in addition to feeling exploited as Danny's best player. Just as Danny's team begins to lose hope, a bus arrives carrying NFL stars. (Note: They are John Madden, Emmitt Smith, Bruce Smith, Tim Brown, and Steve Emtman.) They teach the kids about football and inspire them to believe they can win.

The day of the game, Kevin goads Danny into making a bet: If Danny wins, he gets Kevin's Chevrolet dealership; if Kevin wins, he gets Danny's gas station. Facing a 21-point halftime deficit, the Giants' spirits are lifted when Danny gives a speech, inspiring them to each remember a time when they had a unique accomplishment. He reassures them that they only need to beat the Cowboys one time to prove themselves. With this, they begin to play better and make a comeback. Realizing that Junior is the main threat to the Cowboys, Mike Hammersmith orders Spike to take him out of the game; Spike injures Junior by spearing him with his helmet after the whistle. Kevin reprimands Mike for what happened and threatens to cut Spike from the team if such behavior continues.

Witnessing the attack on Junior, an enraged Becky drops her pompoms and suits up for the game. Becky immediately makes an impact when she forces a fumble after a hit on Spike. In the game's closing seconds with the score tied at 21, the Giants make a goal line stand when Becky stops Spike. With time remaining for one final play, their offense steps back onto the field and uses a play Nubie (a boy who is the Little Giants' assistant coach) calls "The Annexation of Puerto Rico," inspired by Tom Osborne's "fumblerooski". The play includes three different ball carriers, using the hook and lateral from Zolteck, to Junior, and finally to Berman, who scores the Giants' 99 yard game-winning touchdown.

Afterwards, Danny suggests that rather than having the Giants solely represent Urbania, they should merge with the Cowboys, so that both he and Kevin can coach the team. Danny and Patty rekindle their childhood romance. He also decides not to hold Kevin to the prior bet, on the stipulation that the town water tower be changed from "Home of Kevin O'Shea" to "Home of The O'Shea Brothers," reflecting a much earlier promise that Kevin made to Danny from their childhood.

== Cast ==
- Rick Moranis as Danny O'Shea
  - Justin Jon Ross as young Danny O'Shea
- Ed O'Neill as Kevin O'Shea
  - Travis Robertson as young Kevin O'Shea
- Shawna Waldron as Becky (Icebox) O'Shea #56
- Devon Sawa as Junior Floyd, #11
- Todd Bosley as Jake Berman, #99
- Mike Zwiener as Rudy (Gasman) Zolteck, #61
- Danny Pritchett as Tad Simpson, #21
- Troy Simmons as Rashid (Hot Hands) Hanon, #88
- Sam Horrigan as Spike Hammersmith, #32
- Joey Simmirin as Sean Murphy, #48
- Marcus Toji as Marcus (The Toe), #63
- Christopher Walberg as Timmy Moore, #6
- Mathew McCurley as Nubie
- Brian Haley as Mike Hammersmith
- Jon Paul Steuer as Johnny (Viper) Vennaro, #36
- Mary Ellen Trainor as Karen O'Shea
- Susanna Thompson as Patty Floyd
  - Janna Michaels as young Patty Floyd
- Joe Bays as Coach Harold Butz
- *Austin Kottke as young Harold Butz
- Rickey D'Shon Collins as Briggs, #8
- Frank Carl Fisher II. as Billy Patterson
- Eddie Derham as Fast Eddie, #52
- Alexa Vega as Priscilla O'Shea
- Courtney Peldon as Debbie O'Shea
- Harry Shearer as Announcer Cliff Parsons
- Mark Holton as Mr. Zolteck
- Rance Howard as Priest
- Dabbs Greer as Wilbur
- Harry Fleer as Orville
- Pat Crawford Brown as Louise
- John Madden as Himself
- Steve Emtman as Himself
- Bruce Smith as Himself
- Emmitt Smith as Himself
- Tim Brown as Himself

== Production ==
The film was inspired by a 1992 McDonald's Super Bowl commercial developed by Jim Ferguson and Bob Shallcross. According to The Baltimore Sun, after seeing the commercial, Steven Spielberg contacted them and said, "I want that commercial made into a movie. I want my 'Home Alone.'" It was filmed from May 10 to Sep 3, 1994.

== Reception ==
The film received mixed reviews. Stephen Holden remarked, in The New York Times, that "anyone who was ever rejected or picked last for a team can relate to the concept behind 'Little Giants,' a slickly contrived family movie about an inept junior football team that succeeds in spite of spectacular liabilities [...]'Little Giants,' which was directed by Duwayne Dunham, devotes much of its energy to such comic antics as balls getting stuck into face masks, and wispy little kids practicing looking intimidating." Hal Hinson of The Washington Post stated that, "...if 'Little Giants' were in a beauty pageant it might win votes for Miss Congeniality, but it definitely wouldn't take the crown." Conversely, the Los Angeles Times suggested that the film was "smarter than many of its ilk. Clearly a great deal of care and thought has gone into making special a picture that could so easily have been routine family fare." On Rotten Tomatoes, the film currently holds a 50% approval rating with a 5.6/10 average rating, based on 14 reviews. Despite this and its underwhelming box office performance, the film has since been regarded as a cult classic.

=== Box office ===
The film had a budget of $20 million and failed to recoup it, with a total of $19.3 million in box office returns, making it a disappointment at the box office.

=== Year-end lists ===
- Top 10 worst disasters (Ranked #1 in Top 100 Harshest Defense-On-Defense Insults)

== Cultural references ==
In a 2010 NCAA football game, Michigan State defeated Notre Dame on a fake field goal touchdown pass in overtime to end the game. Head coach Mark Dantonio said the play was called "Little Giants".

The uniforms worn by the Cowboys in the film were the same ones worn by the Dallas Cowboys during the 1994 season as part of the NFL's 75th anniversary. From 2004 to 2007, the New York Giants' alternate jerseys were red with white numerals, similar to the jerseys worn by the Little Giants in the movie.

== Home media ==
On February 7, 1995, Warner Home Video released Little Giants on VHS and LaserDisc. The VHS tape includes a Merrie Melodies cartoon, One Froggy Evening, celebrating the 40th anniversary of Michigan J. Frog. On July 8, 2003, the film was released on DVD. On March 29, 2011, the film was re-released in a four pack: 4 Film Favorites: Kids Sports (along with Little Big League, Surf Ninjas, and Hometown Legend).

== See also ==
- List of American football films
