= Saving Shiloh =

- Theatrical release poster
- Directed by: Sandy Tung
- Screenplay by: Dale Rosenbloom
- Based on: Saving Shiloh by Phyllis Reynolds Naylor
- Produced by: Carl Borack; Dale Rosenbloom
- Starring: Jason Dolley; Jordan Garrett; Taylor Momsen; Scott Wilson; Ann Dowd; Gerald McRaney
- Cinematography: Lex DuPont
- Edited by: Clarinda Wong
- Music by: Adam Gorgoni
- Production companies: New Dog; Rosenbloom Entertainment; Utopia Pictures
- Distributed by: New Dog Distribution
- Release date: May 12, 2006
- Running time: 90 minutes
- Country: United States
- Language: English

Saving Shiloh is a 2006 American family drama film directed by Sandy Tung, based on the book of the same name written by Phyllis Reynolds Naylor. It is the third and final film in the trilogy following Shiloh and Shiloh 2: Shiloh Season.

== Plot ==
The movie begins with Marty Preston (Jason Dolley) explaining the events of Shiloh and Shiloh 2: Shiloh Season. Then Judd Travers (Scott Wilson) shows up at the Preston home with dead squirrels as a present for Marty and his family for helping him after his truck accident in the second film. A fearful Shiloh runs into the kitchen since he is still scared of Judd. Marty's sister, Becky (Liberty Smith), embarrasses her mother, Lou (Ann Dowd) when she calls Judd the meanest man, since Judd says he has eaten dead squirrels all his life. Soon, Marty hears from his two best friends, David Howard (Jordan Garrett) and Sam Wallace (Taylor Momsen), that after a fist fight, a drunken Judd has been charged with murder. Marty brings Judd some squirrel stew and offers to help Judd, believing that he has not committed murder, which is confirmed when Marty, David, and Shiloh help capture the real culprits. Soon after, when Marty is helping Judd build a fence for his hunting dogs, Judd accidentally steps on one of his dog's paws. The dog starts attacking Judd, biting his good leg. Judd doesn't show any fear, grabbing the dog and swinging him at a fence. Afterward, when Dara Lynn (Kyle Chavarria), another of Marty's sisters, falls into a lake, Marty jumps in to save her. Shiloh jumps in to help but gets caught in the current, which leads toward Miller Falls. Marty goes back into the lake to save Shiloh but gets caught in a branch. Seeing this, Judd jumps off a cliff into the lake to free Marty. Marty explains to Judd that Shiloh is going to go over the waterfall unless he saves him. Judd saves Shiloh and begins a friendship with Marty and Shiloh. Judd joins the local fire and rescue department after his acts of bravery. The film ends with Marty saying, "If you open your heart, anything is possible".

== Cast ==
- Jason Dolley as Martin ‘’Marty’’ Preston
- Scott Wilson as Judd Travers
- Gerald McRaney as Raymond "Ray" Preston
- Ann Dowd as Louise "Lou" Preston
- Kyle Chavarria as Dara Lynn Preston
- Jordan Garrett as David Howard
- Taylor Momsen as Samantha "Sam" Wallace
- Liberty Smith as Rebecca "Becky" Preston
- Bonnie Bartlett as Mrs. Wallace
- Kari as Shiloh

== Reception ==
While Richard Roeper said that he felt as if he "were being preached to throughout this film", Roger Ebert says that it is a "family film that deals with real problems and teaches real values, and yet is exciting and entertaining". It has a rating of 41% on Rotten Tomatoes.
