= Shiloh (Naylor novel) =

1991 novel by Phyllis Reynolds Naylor

- First edition cover of Shiloh
- Author: Phyllis Reynolds Naylor
- Language: English
- Genre: Children's novel
- Publisher: Atheneum
- Publication date: September 30, 1991
- Publication place: United States
- Media type: Print (hardback & paperback)
- Pages: 144
- ISBN: 0-689-31614-3
- OCLC: 21441925
- LC Class: PZ7.N24 Sg 1991
- Followed by: Shiloh Season; Saving Shiloh; A Shiloh Christmas

Shiloh is a Newbery Medal-winning children's novel by Phyllis Reynolds Naylor published in 1991. The 65th book by Naylor, it is the first in a quartet about a young boy and the title character, an abused dog. Naylor decided to write Shiloh after an emotionally taxing experience in West Virginia where she encountered an abused dog.

Narrator and protagonist Marty Preston lives in the hills of Friendly, West Virginia. After finding an abused beagle owned by his brutal neighbor Judd Travers, Marty defies his society's standards of not meddling in each other's business. Marty resolves to steal and hide the dog, naming him Shiloh and fabricating a web of lies to keep his secret. After his theft is discovered, Marty discovers Judd shooting a deer out of season and blackmails him into selling Shiloh to him. Because he lacks the money to buy Shiloh, Marty resolutely works for Judd doing numerous chores.

Primarily a Bildungsroman and adventure novel, the novel depicts the emotional tribulations and maturing of an 11-year-old boy. Some themes of the novel are ethics, consequentialism, religion and morality, and animal–human relationships. Marty learns that morality is confounding and must choose between two unpalatable choices: rescuing the abused Shiloh through stealing and lying or allowing Judd to keep abusing Shiloh.

Reviewers generally gave positive reviews of the book and were impressed by the novel's suspense and vernacular language. In addition to the Newbery Medal, Shiloh has received many state awards voted upon by children, including the Sequoyah Children's Book Award, the Mark Twain Readers Award, and the William Allen White Children's Book Award. In 1996, the book was adapted into a film of the same name. The novel spawned three sequels, Shiloh Season, Saving Shiloh, and A Shiloh Christmas published in 1996, 1997, and 2015, respectively. Shiloh is taught in many elementary school courses in the United States.

== Background and publishing ==
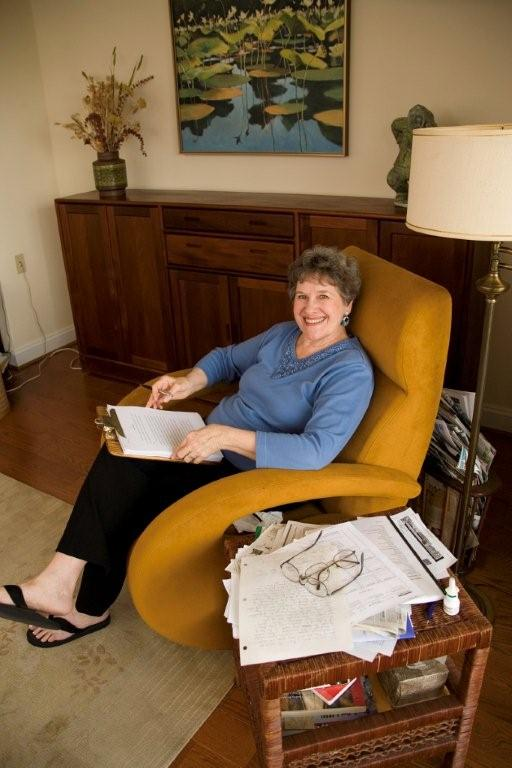
Phyllis Reynolds Naylor in her writing chair, where she writes the first two drafts of every book by hand.

Born in 1933 in Anderson, Indiana, Phyllis Reynolds Naylor was raised in Indiana and Illinois in the 1930s during the Great Depression. During her childhood she was hardly given any toys. Instead, with her parents reading to her every night, books formed a major part of her early years—"the happiest part". Her parents read a variety of literature to her, including Bible stories, The Wind in the Willows, and Mark Twain's novels, until she was 14. After she became a parent, she read to her children in the mornings because of their evening activities. At 16, Naylor wrote a short story for a church magazine, and in her early thirties she published her first book. She has published over 100 books. When she wrote and published Shiloh, her 65th novel, she was living in Bethesda, Maryland with her husband Rex, a speech pathologist whom she married in May 1960. She has two adult sons and four grandchildren.

Naylor writes books for children, teens, and adults. Writing sporadically, Naylor typically takes several years to finish a book. With about 10 notebooks next to her workspace, she writes down story ideas and character traits when she thinks of them. She considered Shiloh to be a deviation from the norm because she finished the first draft in just eight weeks.

Edited by Jonathan Lanman, Shiloh was published by Atheneum Books on September 30, 1991. The novel has been translated into at least 10 languages: Chinese, Dutch, French, German, Hebrew, Italian, Japanese, Korean, Spanish, and Swedish.

== Plot summary ==
The novel is set in the small town of Friendly, West Virginia, (Note: Nicknamed the "Mountain State", West Virginia abounds in mountains and rivers. For hundreds of years, the state has been home to hunters of deer, bears, beavers, and other animals. Before 1600, Native American tribes of the Iroquois, the Cherokee, and the Shawnee hunted for food. In the contemporary day, people hunt despite most of the large animals' having disappeared. Numerous laws in West Virginia determine "when, where, how, and what animals may be hunted". In the rural hill setting, neighbors because of local customs rarely meddle in each other's business. Respect of elders and a commitment to honesty are expected of children.) where an eleven-year-old boy named Marty Preston finds a stray beagle wandering in the hills near his house. The dog follows him home, and Marty later names the dog Shiloh. Shiloh's real owner is Judd Travers, who owns several hunting dogs. Fearing for the dog's safety because Judd drinks and treats his hunting dogs poorly, Marty does not want to return Shiloh. His father insists that Shiloh be returned to his rightful owner and they take the dog home to Judd.

Shiloh returns to Marty, who hides him from his family. Concealing Shiloh in the woods in a wire pen he builds, Marty smuggles some of his food to the dog every day. After his mother discovers Marty feeding the dog, he persuades her not to reveal the secret for at least one night. That night, Shiloh is attacked by a German Shepherd Dog while in his makeshift cage and his family discovers Marty has been lying and hiding the dog. After taking the dog to the town doctor, the family must return Shiloh to his rightful owner by Sunday.

Before doing so, Marty travels up to Travers' house to try to convince Travers to allow him to keep Shiloh. Judd does not see Marty approaching, and shoots a doe out of season, which would mean a stiff fine Judd cannot afford. Marty lets Judd know he knows, and attempts to blackmail him out of Shiloh. Judd and Marty eventually negotiate a deal in which Marty will earn Shiloh for 40 dollars, paid with 20 hours of working for Judd. At the end of the first week, Judd says that he will not keep his end of the deal because the evidence of the dead doe has with the passage of time disappeared. Second, the contract that Marty had him sign is worthless in the state of West Virginia without the signature of a witness. Despite Judd's pointed disapproval of his work, Marty continues to work for him. They begin discussing dogs and Judd's father who began physically abusing Judd when he was four years old. In the end, Judd warms to Marty and lets him keep Shiloh.

== Autobiographical elements ==
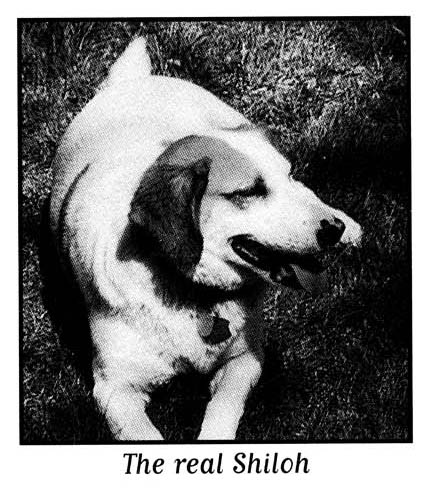
Clover, the mistreated beagle in West Virginia who inspired Naylor to write Shiloh.

I went to investigate [something following us along the grass] and found a dog that I assumed to be a beagle, though in truth it was a mixed breed of who-knows-what. But it was the saddest looking dog I had ever seen—skinny, ill-kept, hungry, and obviously mistreated. Its tail was wagging hopefully, but every time I put out my hand to touch it, the dog trembled and shook, and crawled away on its belly as though I were about to do it bodily harm.

— Phyllis Reynolds Naylor

In a 1992 interview about Shiloh, Naylor said: "Like a patchwork quilt, a novel is made up of things that have happened to me and things I have heard or read about, all mixed up with imaginings". Naylor's characters are frequently based on herself and her two sons. She penned the novel following an excursion with her husband, Rex, to visit their friends, Frank and Trudy Madden, in West Virginia. Naylor and Rex were strolling along a river when they discovered a dog in the grass following them. Dejected and frightened, the dog was "the saddest, most mistreated-looking beagle I'd ever seen", according to Naylor. Because the dog frequently shuddered and slunk forward on her belly, Naylor suspected she had been abused. On a whim, Naylor whistled and the dog rushed forward, lapping Naylor's face. Tailing them until they reached the Maddens' house, the beagle remained under a tree, her paws cushioning her head during the drizzly afternoon. Naylor cried during her and her husband's trip home that night.

Rex asked her if she would have a "nervous breakdown" or if she would "do something about it". That "something" referred to writing a book, which she did. She believed that someone had abused the dog and was confronted by a series of questions:

What if I knew who was abusing it? What if I knew who it belonged to? What if the dog kept running to me? Then, if you write for children, you think about what if I was 11 years old?

The Maddens resided near Shiloh, West Virginia, where Naylor found the abused dog in 1989, so she decided to name the book's dog Shiloh. Because the Maddens' post office address is in Friendly, West Virginia, Naylor chose the town as her book's setting. Trudy and Frank Madden adopted the abused dog Naylor had seen. (Note: Deeply affected by the anguish Naylor felt, the Maddens searched for the beagle. After finding her, they brought the beagle to the veterinarian. They contemplated delivering her to the animal shelter but ultimately decided to adopt her, naming her Clover. In a 1992 interview with The Washington Post, Frank Madden affirmed that his family was caring for the dog and that Clover was "healthy and romping around in the snow right now". Naylor happily noted that Clover had become "the happiest dog in West Virginia". After Shiloh was awarded the Newbery Medal, Clover became nationally noticed. She even participated in a "paw-tographing", wherein she signed copies of Shiloh using her inked paw. In a 1997 interview with The Virginian-Pilot, Trudy Madden said: "We've put in quite a few years of taking her around to local schools so children can see her and pet her and get her paw print. But at this point, we've turned down those requests because she's just not up to it". At 10 years old in 1997, Clover had become debilitated. No longer possessing the strength to bark at visitors, deer, or cats, she passes the day by resting under bushes at the front of the house. In the early years, the Maddens took her on a 3-mile daily walk. By 1997, Clover could walk for only half a mile before having to return home.) Trudy Madden said in a 1997 interview that Naylor's description of Shiloh, West Virginia, was precise. By following the directions in Shiloh and its sequels, the town's houses, mill, and schoolhouse could be located easily. (Note: Following Shiloh's publication in 1991, the Friendly post office erected a sign affirming that Clover, the dejected dog that inspired the novel, lived in the town. The sign urged visitors to call prior to visiting the Maddens to see Clover.)

== Style ==
[I]t is a deceptively simple story about good and evil, truth and honesty and the various dimensions between, presented in the colorful setting of the West Virginia mountains.

— Nancy Gilson in The Columbus Dispatch

Shiloh is told in the first person in main character Marty Preston's voice. The prose has perceptible grammatical errors and a bucolic tone. Arlene Perly Rae of Toronto Star wrote that the novel is written in the "uncomplicated style" for which Naylor is distinguished. Jane Langton of The New York Times Book Review stated that the novel was written in a "comfortable, down-home style". Writing that the main story in Shiloh is Marty's struggle in his mind with morality, Langston noted that it is "presented simply, in a way any third- or fourth-grade reader can understand". Scholar Kathie Cerra praised the novel for its "vivid sensory detail", which enables readers to experience Marty's "inner life of thought and feeling". In Marty's "teem[ing] with life" first-person narrative, he shows how he feels when he tells lies to his parents and when he embraces the wriggling Shiloh.

Academic Leona W. Fisher wrote in Children's Literature Association Quarterly that the novel employs a seldom used yet ingenious literary technique: the story is told with "the sustained internal monologue presented almost exclusively in the present tense". The mores of his society and the actions of adults are strained through Marty's mind concurrently with his emotional agony and ethical judgments. The dialogue of the other characters tempers but does not counteract the "exclusivity of his linguistic point of view" because Marty is the sole narrator. Shiloh has a "compacted time-frame, bounded by the past-tense opening and closing". Fisher noted that because the novel's events are confined to several weeks in the summer, there is no need for a "panoramic sweep" of the actions. The reader can concentrate solely on Marty's ethical crisis. Conveying the mood of the novel is also mostly confined to Marty's thoughts and current action. Naylor uses the past-perfect verb "had" on several occasions to depict the tones of the scenes. This usage conveys turning-points in the story, transferring the reader from the "immediate tension" of the present to a growing cognizance.

Scholars Alethea Helbig and Agnes Perkins wrote that the "Appalachian setting is well evoked, in both its beauty and its code of ethics that Marty must defy to save the dog". Reviewer Ellen Mandel of Booklist wrote that the "West Virginia dialect richly seasons the true-to-life dialogue". Kenneth E. Kowen of School Library Journal perceived an incongruity in Naylor's depiction of Marty's family. He noted that Marty's father is a postman, one of the best paid jobs in suburban settings. In the novel, however, the family is poverty-stricken.

Reviewer Cecilia Goodnow noted that Shiloh is a Bildungsroman and adventure novel. Marty undergoes a physical and emotional transformation in his quest to save Shiloh. After confronting an abusive adult, he mentally grows, concluding: "I saved Shiloh and opened my eyes some. Now that ain't bad for eleven". Salem Press's Carol Ann Gearhart has characterized the novel as domestic realism.

== Themes ==
=== Abuse and love ===
Physically abused as a child, Judd wants to keep Shiloh because he does not comprehend why people are so interested in rescuing the abused dog. No one cared to rescue Judd when he was harmed throughout his youth. Despite Judd's growing into a harsh man, reviewer Hary Sheehan noted, he preserves a glimmer of empathy. Journalist Kate Cavanaugh wrote that Judd's inability to love and cherish Shiloh is borne because of the love his family nurtured in him.

=== Animal–human relationships ===
Author Timothy Morris wrote that the plot and themes in Shiloh had many parallels to the 1940 novel Lassie Come-Home by Eric Knight. In both novels, boys fall in love with dogs owned by others. The dogs repeatedly return to the children in "mirror imag[e] scenes", while the ethical fathers try to convince them not to betray their morals and fall for the dogs.

Morris wrote that Shiloh's faithfulness to Marty is portrayed in "affective human terms". In the secluded, bucolic West Virginia, Shiloh becomes the masculine friend Marty did not have. The beagle adopts the persona of the brother Marty never had. Marty doggedly believes that Shiloh and other animals are creatures with feelings. Attune with Marty's emotions, the beagle is considered by Marty to be a confidante. On the other hand, in pastoral West Virginia, some adults consider animals to bring only economic benefits to humans. Morris stated that children like Marty defy their rural culture and advance to an upper-class mindset.

Scholar Claudia Mills wrote that Marty's parents subscribe to the belief that because Shiloh is Judd's property, they should not be concerned with how Judd treats Shiloh. They tell Marty: "You've got to go by the law. The law says that a man that pays money for a dog owns that dog". At odds with this philosophy, Marty strongly believes that love—not money—should determine ownership.

=== Ethics ===
In Shiloh, Naylor does not impart an explicit meaning of "honesty" to her juvenile readers, journalist Nancy Gilson observed. Instead, she conveys how "confusing and unanswerable" morality is using main character Marty's ethical predicaments and plot twists. To harbor Shiloh from the antagonist Judd and his principled parents, Marty must steal food and tell falsehoods. His dishonest actions serve as a contrast to his conscientious persona and his benevolent rescuing of the dog. In one scene, Marty prays, "Jesus ... which do you want me to do? Be one hundred percent honest and carry that dog back to Judd so that one of your creatures can be kicked and starved all over again, or keep him here and fatten him up to glorify your creation?"

According to Judith B. Rosenfeld of the Knoxville News-Sentinel, Naylor makes the statement that children raised in healthy families make ethical choices and ultimately thrive. In a 1994 interview Naylor said:

One of the pluses of writing for children is that the child may very well be reading about the subject for the first time. In Shiloh, there's a moral dilemma with no black or white answer; the character compromises. It may be the child's first time to realize that there are not sure answers. It's sort of thrilling to have a child meet a problem like this for the first time.

Naylor believes that there is much "gray area between right and wrong". Instead of following the straightforward correct path, Marty is forced to select between two unpalatable choices. Reviewer Matt Berman of The Times-Picayune believed that the book's main moral is that "nothing is as simple as it seems". Entertainment Weekly's Michele Landsberg praised the novel, writing that Shiloh is a "strongly persuasive story of moral growth, told without a hint of moralizing and with acute insight into a preadolescent's inner life".

In the children's literature journal The ALAN Review published by The Assembly on Literature for Adolescents, Edgar H. Thompson, Connie B. Blevins, and Allison Fitzgerald argued that protagonist Marty "consistently behaves" at levels 5 and 6 of Kohlberg's stages of development. For instance, on his walk to Judd's house, he wonders: "Easy as pie for Judd Travers to put a bullet hole in my head, say he didn't see me". Despite his fears, Marty continues walking to Judd's house, persistent on protecting Shiloh despite potential bodily harm and even death to himself. The authors brooded over whether an 11 year old could attain such an elevated level despite most adults' never being able to do so. Ultimately noting that the Newbery Committee and thousands of readers consider Marty to be realistic, they concluded that Marty is a positive role model for children to strive to be.

=== Consequentialism ===
In her essay "The Structure of the Moral Dilemma in Shiloh" for Children's Literature, Claudia Mills wrote that Shiloh deals with "consequentialism pitted against deontological respect for moral duty". Taught from his youth to be respectful to others and worship God, Marty is confounded by the injustice of Shiloh's being abused. He seeks to justify his unethical actions by thinking that "[a] lie don't seem a lie anymore when it's meant to save a dog". Consequentionalists base the worthiness of a person's act on its result. Marty's act of saving Shiloh is worse for Shiloh's well-being. After Shiloh is concealed in the woods, a German shepherd attacks the beagle, causing him to be wounded and lame. Marty laments: "Worst of all, I'd brought Shiloh here to keep him from being hurt, and what that German shepherd done to him was probably worse than anything Judd Travers would have brought himself to do, short of shootin' him, anyways".

Mills noted that consequentialism does not merely expect that the consequences to one entity is determined. It requires a review of the consequences to all. When Marty observes Judd's out-of-season shooting of a deer, he uses the incident to blackmail him to sell Shiloh to him. However, this places deer in the future in danger of Judd's hunting. Marty sadly reflects: "By lettin' him get away with this, I'm putting other deer in danger. He kill this one out of season, he'll figure maybe he can kill some more. To save Shiloh, I'm making it harder for deer". In essence, he selects the "domestic love over the grander principle".

=== Religion and morality ===
Reviewers observed that religion plays an influential role in Marty's moral decisions. After Marty takes a forbidden bite from his sister Dara Lynn's chocolate Easter rabbit and refuses to own up, his mother is disappointed. She tells him: "Dara Lynn don't know who ate the ear off her candy rabbit and I don't know who did it, but Jesus knows. And right this minute Jesus is looking down with the saddest eyes on the person who ate that chocolate". Marty's very religious mother teaches him that people should not sin or they will be "separated forever from God's love".

Academic Claudia Mills wrote that Marty determines to save Shiloh in a scene that is reminiscent of Huckleberry Finn's well-known resolution to save Jim from slavery: "All right, then, I'll go to hell". Thinking about the falsehoods he has told to save Shiloh, he believes he is bound for hell. He reflects:

If what Grandma Preston told me once about heaven and hell is true, and liars go to hell, then I guess that's where I'm headed. But she also told me that only people are allowed in heaven, not animals. And if I was to go to heaven and look down to see Shiloh left below, head on his paws, I'd run away from heaven sure.

Near the novel's conclusion, Judd refuses to honor his agreement with Marty because there was no witness. When Marty asks his mother what a witness is, she responds: "Somebody who knows the Lord Jesus and don't mind tellin' about it". Despite Judd's refusal to honor the agreement, Marty persistently maintains his part of it. He decides: "I got no choice. All I can do is stick to my side of the deal and see what happens. All in the world I can do". After ultimately ceding Shiloh to Marty, Judd asks: "What you going to do with that dog once he's yours?" Marty's simple reply is: "Love him". Scholar Claudia Mills noted that: "The resolution of the stand-off comes when Marty, in essence, stands witness, in his mother's religious sense of witness, for an ethic of love, crystallized in his love for Shiloh".

== Reception ==
The News & Observer's Elizabeth Ward listed Shiloh as one of the best children's books in 1991. She called the book a "heartstopping, but tough-as-steel story of a boy and an abused dog in the hardscrabble hill country of West Virginia". Author Timothy Morris deemed Shiloh to be the "most celebrated dog novel of the nineties". Michele Landsberg of Entertainment Weekly called Shiloh a "compelling read" and rated the novel an A. Equating Shiloh to classics like Charlotte's Web, author Laura Elliott praised the novel's "voice, suspense, and layer of themes".

After Shiloh received the Newbery Award, Jane Langton wrote in The New York Times Book Review: "Did Shiloh really deserve the prize? Surely there must have been a book more important than this agreeable but slight story". Langton opined that Shiloh was "a good book, not a great book" and that there must have been few worthy children's books that year. The Sacramento Bee's Judy Green disagreed, believing that Shiloh was "worthy of its award, which labels it the best fiction for children written last year". Green lauded Naylor for her "excellent portrayal of Marty's introspection and superb storytelling in the area's vernacular".

The Booklist's Ellen Mandel extolled the novel for its "moving and powerful look" at the virtues and vices of human nature and the murky moral choices in conflicts of everyday life. In her favorable review of Shiloh, Betsy Hearne of The Bulletin of the Center for Children's Books wrote that "readers will be absorbed by the suspenseful plot, which will leave them with some memorable characterizations as well as several intriguing ethical questions". K.B. Cartwright of The Reading Teacher also praised the novel for providing a "gripping account of family conflict and honesty". In a similarly positive review, Kirkus Reviews praised the book for being a "gripping account of a mountain boy's love for a dog he's hiding from its owner". Calling it "unusually warm and moving", Heather Vogel Frederick of The Christian Science Monitor praised the novel for being an "excellent choice as a family read-aloud".

Censors have objected to the profanity in Shiloh. Naylor received an angry letter from the parents of a 10-year-old boy, who were angered by the language in the book. The character Judd had sworn "dammit". The author replied in an interview with The Virginian-Pilot that some people in the world "speak crudely" and "you can't put your child in a glass bubble and protect him always". Several West Virginian book reviewers have complained about the dialect in the novel, believing that West Virginians do not speak with a dialect. In one review, a newspaper writer said that when she read the book to her children, she chose not to read with the dialect.

== Honors ==
In 1992, Shiloh received the John Newbery Medal. (Note: The Newbery Award was initially given in 1922 by Frederic G. Melcher who edited Publishers Weekly. Its namesake is an 18th-century English bookseller and writer, John Newbery. Newbery is reputed to have founded the first bookstore solely dedicated to books for children. The Newbery Award Committee, composed of a panel of 15 elected members, determines the winner of the Newbery Award each year. Seven are appointed and eight are elected. Members are chosen by the Association for Library Service to Children, a subsidiary of the American Library Association. Because over 15,000 children's books are published each year, the panel depends on librarians' nominations. The Newbery Award Committee meets three times to discuss the books and then selects the recipient through consensus.) The annual award, bestowed by the children's librarians division of the American Library Association, is given for "the most distinguished contribution to American literature for children". Shiloh was a dark horse for the award. Ohio State University Professor Rudine Sims Bishop, a member of the 1992 Newbery committee, said in an interview that Shiloh was a "sleeper" that surfaced as a serious contender deep in their debate. After the January 27 announcement of Shiloh's winning the Newbery Medal, Naylor was flooded with numerous phone calls, requests for interviews, and mail. In an interview from April that year, Naylor said: "Frankly, to go the bathroom, I have had to take the phone off the hook". The book was also selected as an American Library Association Notable Children's Book.

In January 1994, over 60,000 third–sixth graders in the state of Oklahoma selected Shiloh from 23 nominees as the winner of the Sequoyah Children's Book Award. (Note: The Sequoyah Book Award was first awarded in 1959. Named after Sequoyah who invented the Cherokee syllabary, it is the third oldest "children's choice" award in the United States.) The Sequoyah Award was presented to Naylor in April during the yearly Oklahoma Library Association conference. On April 14, at the annual conference of the Missouri Association of School Librarians, Shiloh received that year's Mark Twain Readers Award. The Mark Twain Award is decided annually through a vote by fourth–eighth graders in the state of Missouri. On October 29, Naylor received the William Allen White Children's Book Award for Shiloh. The award is decided through the tallying of over 55,000 children in the state of Kansas.

In 1997, The Virginian-Pilot chose Shiloh as the subject of a "community-wide effort to get people of all ages reading and talking about books". Beginning in October, the newspaper serialized Shiloh, publishing two chapters every week until the end of November. It also created a book guide about Shiloh and printed 1,000 copies for parents and teachers. A chat room was created for children to direct questions and comments about Shiloh. In 1999, Shiloh was selected as a recommended novel for children ages nine to twelve in the Read Across America initiative. In 2000, the Shiloh trilogy placed at number seven on the National Education Association's Children's Top 100 book list. Naylor was delighted that children had given her work such a high ranking. (Note: The six literary works ranked before Shiloh were the Goosebumps series, Green Eggs and Ham, The Cat in the Hat, the Arthur series and Charlotte's Web.) Shiloh is taught in many American elementary school courses.

== Sequels ==
I think the reason I wrote the sequels is because the kids were so full of rage ... they wrote to me, and they were so angry this man got away. They wanted him shot through the heart, stabbed through the eye, they wanted him to fall off a cliff. I'm glad they were so emotional (about the book), but I didn't want to leave them with so much rage.

— Phyllis Reynolds Naylor in a March 2000 interview

Shiloh has three sequels, Shiloh Season, Saving Shiloh, and A Shiloh Christmas published in 1996, 1997, and 2015 respectively. In Shiloh Season, Naylor renews the strife by restoring Judd's hostility and aggravating it with a bout of drinking issues. Marty fears Judd will take back Shiloh and be faithless to the deal they made. Whereas in Shiloh Marty confronts the confusing and ambiguous concept of morality, in Shiloh Season he must face the notion of wickedness.

In the third book, Saving Shiloh, Marty's parents persuade Marty that people who have wronged are worthy of forgiveness. In the midst of several robberies and a murder, the community hastily faults Judd. Willing to grant Judd a second chance, Marty attempts to help him. Meanwhile, Marty and his family must face the intricacies of life such as death, hostility, and sibling rivalry.

Published on September 22, 2015, the fourth book, A Shiloh Christmas, was published by Atheneum, which printed 200,000 copies. A ferocious drought strikes Marty's community, and a new pastor joins blaming remorseless sinners for instigating it. Looking for a scapegoat, community members lie the responsibility squarely on people like Judd, an alcoholic and animal abuser who has reformed. A fire ravages multiple houses, including Judd's, prompting Marty and his family to help the homeowners reconstruct their homes. One day, Marty and a friend stumble upon Rachel, the pastor's daughter, confined to the pastor's toolshed. The incident forces Marty's parents to determine whether the disciplinary action has crossed the line from being disciplinary to being abusive. The book ends with characters who have vehemently differing views having a therapeutic Christmas meal together.

Naylor penned the sequels in response to "the surprising degree of hatred which children show toward Judd Travers". Noting that Judd's life had been molded by the abuse he suffered as a child, she hoped that the novels would enable children to see Judd as a person like Marty who must make difficult moral choices.

The first three books in the quartet each were made into a film: Shiloh in 1996, Shiloh Season in 1999, and Saving Shiloh in 2006.

== Adaptations ==
=== Film ===
In 1996 Warner Bros. Pictures released Shiloh, which was directed by Dale Rosenbloom. (Note: Rosenbloom discovered Shiloh when he was trying to find a book for his nephew. Immediately connecting with the book because he had adopted an abused dog in his youth and kept her until she died at 16, Rosenbloom selected it to be turned into a film for his directorial debut. Shiloh was appropriate because he wanted to make "family pictures that featured character studies".) The first of Naylor's more than 100 juvenile and adult works to be adapted into a film, it starred Blake Heron as Marty and Scott Wilson as Judd Travers. Budgeted at less than $2 million, Shiloh was filmed in 30 days in October 1996 at Topanga, California.

Rosenbloom's film differed from Naylor's novel in several key aspects. In the novel, Marty's family is poor and economic opportunities are limited. The family's four-room homestead is ancient and has not seen remodeling in decades. In the film, the family is wealthy and there are numerous economic opportunities. The family's two-story house is a "stunning showplace of hardwoods, elegant color schemes, and tasteful appointments". Marty makes money very quickly by doing various chores. By transforming Marty's family from being poor to being well off, Rosenbloom makes the conflict between Marty and Judd an emotional, instead of an economic one. In the novel, Marty and his family hunt animals, while in the film, his father does not hunt. Author Timothy Morris states that "[t]he force of the film's ideology is to blur all distinctions between humans and animals". Judd is transformed from a native in the novel into an interloper in the film who holds the contrarian view that humans and animals are different, that "[a]nimals were put here for us. They ain' got no other purpose or feelin's".

Instead of being about Marty's love for Shiloh, most of the novel occurs in Marty's thoughts such as when he ponders about telling falsehoods to his parents. Because the book was considered "very internal" by the major film studios, director Dale Rosenbloom labored over making the film more external. Rosenbloom added new characters and scenes to the story and faxed each change to the novel's author. Naylor was neither fearful of Rosenbloom's changes nor unhesitant at suggesting changes. After the film was released, Naylor said that Rosenbloom "did a very good job", and Rosenbloom said: "We did do right by the book and her ... She lives by her code and if you honor it, she appreciates it". By June 1997, Naylor had seen the film six times. In an interview that month, she noted that she was always struck by the hush of the theater and by how the film entrances everyone, even the children.

Despite an underwhelming performance in the movie theaters, the film received high video sales. Ranking Shiloh as one of his top 10 selections, Roger Ebert praised the film for being a "remarkably mature and complex story about a boy who loves a dog and cannot bear to see it mistreated", depicting "the real world with all of its terrors and responsibilities". Shiloh was honored with "best film" at the Chicago International Film Festival.

=== Audiobook ===
The audiobook version of Shiloh was released by Bantam Books in 1992. Performed by Peter MacNicol, the three-hour-long audiobook is unabridged. Author John Wynne praised MacNicol's delivery, writing that he "does character voices well—both male and female—and creates a folksy atmosphere appropriate to the material".

Awards
Preceded by Maniac Magee	Newbery Medal recipient 1992	Succeeded by Missing May
Preceded by Maniac Magee	Winner of the William Allen White Children's Book Award; 1994	Succeeded by The Man Who Loved Clowns
