= Shiloh, Tyler County, West Virginia =

Shiloh
- Unincorporated community
- Location within the state of West Virginia Shiloh (the United States)
- Coordinates: 39°27′22″N 81°0′41″W
- Country: United States
- State: West Virginia
- County: Tyler
- Time zone: UTC-5 (Eastern (EST))
  - Summer (DST): UTC-4 (EDT)
- FIPS code: 1555612

Shiloh is an unincorporated community on Middle Island Creek in Tyler County, West Virginia, United States. Shiloh had its own post office in operation in the early 20th century.

== History ==
The first white settlers in what is now Tyler County, WV came in the late 1790s or very early 19th century. Tyler County was once a part of Ohio County Va(WV). One of the first families in Shiloh was the Cornell family. Jacob and his wife Druscilla Ankrom purchased land along Middle Island Creek. A farm was started and was home to a least 4 generations of Cornells. The land was sold out of Cornell ownership in 1945 after Luella Cornell died in 1944. A Cornell farmhouse remained on the original land until it burned in the late 1990s.

Jacob Cornell and his wife Druscilla Ankrom remained buried on this land until this day.

The town is also the namesake for the fictional beagle dog in the children's book quartet Shiloh (novel), written by Phyllis Reynolds Naylor. The first three books were also made into theatrical films (see Shiloh).
