= Zachary Browne =

American television and film actor

- Occupation: Actor
- Years active: 1993–1999

Zachary Browne is an American former television and film actor.

Browne has had guest roles on ER, 7th Heaven and Dr. Quinn, Medicine Woman, among other shows. He was also on 7th Heaven as Stan in 1997, and Kyle (young) on The Pretender. He auditioned for the role of Marty Preston in Shiloh (1996) and the director was very impressed with him. He did not get the part because he was too young. However, by the time Shiloh 2 was being cast he was 13 years old and was remembered when he auditioned. Shiloh 2: Shiloh Season (1999) was Zachary's final film, as he ceased acting at the age of 14.

== Filmography ==
=== Film ===
Year	Title	Role	Notes
1993	To Sleep with a Vampire	Daniel	Uncredited
1993	Kid	William	Short film
1995	Man of the House	Norman Bronski	
1997	Family Plan	Eli Mackenzie	
1998	Waking Up Horton	Mark	
1999	Shiloh 2: Shiloh Season	Marty Preston	

=== Television ===
Year	Title	Role	Notes
1993	Empty Cradle	Sam	Television film
1995	Sisters	Little Boy	Episode 4.12: "Second Thoughts"
1995	ER	Jake Leeds	7 episodes
1996	Renegade	Eli	Episode 4.16: "Rio Reno"
1996	Minor Adjustments	Kevin	Episode 1.12: "Make My Day"
1996	Wiseguy	Alex Callendar	Television film
1997	Baywatch	Clifford	Episode 7.22: "Nevermore"
1997	The Pretender	Young Kyle	3 episodes
1997	7th Heaven	Stanley	Episode 2.7: "Girls Just Want to Have Fun"
1998	Dr. Quinn, Medicine Woman	Oliver Dinston	Episode 6.14: "Seeds of Doubt"
1998	Kelly Kelly	Todd	Episode 1.5: "Bye Bye Baby"
1999	The Darwin Conspiracy	Judd Reynolds	Television film

== Awards and nominations ==
Year	Association	Category	Work	Result
1998	Young Artist Award	Best Performance in a TV Drama Series: Guest Starring Young Actor	The Pretender	Nominated
2000	Young Artist Award	Best Performance in a Feature Film or TV Movie: Young Ensemble	Shiloh 2: Shiloh Season	Won
