= Chip Rosenbloom =

American filmmaker (born 1964)

- Born: Dale Rosenbloom; July 3, 1964 (age 62); New York City, U.S.
- Occupations: Filmmaker, entrepreneur, composer
- Spouse: Kathleen Melville (m. 1988)
- Children: 2
- Parent(s): Georgia Frontiere; Carroll Rosenbloom

Dale "Chip" Rosenbloom (born July 3, 1964) is an American filmmaker and composer, known for the films Shiloh, Across the Tracks, and Fuel as well as the stage show Bronco Billy The Musical. He has produced over thirty films and television movies. He is president of Rosenbloom Entertainment and founder/owner of Open Pictures. He was formerly the co-owner and vice chairman of the Los Angeles Rams professional football franchise.

== Career ==
Rosenbloom was born July 3, 1964, in New York City to Carroll Rosenbloom and Georgia Rosenbloom (later Frontiere).

After graduating the USC Film School (now the USC School of Cinematic Arts), Rosenbloom began his career at Aaron Spelling Studios, followed by working in development for Mace Neufeld Productions. He began his career as an independent filmmaker in 1990. Among his films in the early 1990s were Across the Tracks, Nails, and the ABC movie Ride With the Wind. In 1997, he wrote, produced, and directed the multi-award-winning feature film Shiloh which tells the story of a young boy who rescues an abused dog.

Rosenbloom produced the WB Keri Russell vehicle Eight Days a Week. From here, Rosenbloom began making documentary films. Notably, Reckless Indifference, is the true story of a teenage fight gone wrong, resulting in the murder of Jimmy Farris, and the sentencing injustice that followed. It won the International Press Academy Award, and is taught in several law schools.

In 2007, Rosenbloom produced the Weinstein Group film The Girl in the Park. That same year, he was nominated for a Tony Award for producing the August Wilson play Radio Golf.

In 2008, he produced the documentary Fuel, which was short-listed for an Oscar.

In 2013, Rosenbloom executive-produced The Call. In 2015, Rosenbloom executive-produced the film Careful What You Wish For and the Ryan Ferguson documentary, Dream/Killer. Rosenbloom also co-wrote and produced the drama Evan’s Crime, starring David Arquette.

In 2017, Rosenbloom produced the Emmy-nominated Intent to Destroy, directed by Joe Berlinger.

The following year, Rosenbloom executive-produced The Kindergarten Teacher, starring Maggie Gyllenhaal. In 2019, he also served as executive producer of Driveways.

Additionally, he has written a number of songs for musical artists including Dayna Lane, Sheena Easton, and Rita Coolidge, and is the Ovation Award winning composer of Bronco Billy The Musical based on the Clint Eastwood movie, set to open in London in 2024, following an opening in Los Angeles in 2019.

== Awards ==
Rosenbloom's productions have been honored with several awards, including: Best Film at the 1997 Chicago International Film Festival (Shiloh, 1997), the Crystal Heart Award at the 1997 Heartland Film Festival (Shiloh, 1997), the Humanities Award (Shiloh, 1997), Genesis Award for Best Feature Film (Shiloh, 1998), Tony nomination for Best Play (Radio Golf, 2007), Sundance Film Festival's Best Documentary Audience Award (Fuel, 2008), Emmy nomination for Outstanding Historical Documentary (Intent to Destroy, 2019), Best Documentary Film Award at the 2017 DOC LA (Intent to Destroy, 2019), and Ovation Awards’ Best Music & Lyrics for an Original Musical (Bronco Billy, 2019).

== Filmography ==
=== Director ===
- Shiloh (1996)

=== Writer ===
- Instant Karma (1990)
- Shiloh (1996)
- Shiloh 2: Shiloh Season (1999)
- Saving Shiloh (2006)
- Evan’s Crime (2015)

=== Producer ===
- Instant Karma (1990)
- Across the Tracks (1991)
- Nails (1992)
- A Woman, Her Men, and Her Futon (1993)
- Ride With the Wind (1994)
- Red Ribbon Blues (1995)
- Shiloh (1996)
- Eight Days a Week (1997)
- Confessions of a Sexist Pig (1998)
- Shiloh 2: Shiloh Season (1999)
- Reckless Indifference (2001)
- Learn the Game: The Big Football Game (2004)
- Saving Shiloh (2006)
- Fan-Demanium (2007)
- The Girl in the Park (2007)
- Alice Upside Down (2008)
- Fuel (2008)
- Open Graves (2009)
- Make Me Young: Youth Knows No Pain (2010)
- Radio Free Albemuth (2011)
- Janeane from Des Moines (2012)
- Fame High (2012)
- The Call (2013)
- Careful What You Wish For (2015)
- Dream/Killer (2015)
- Intent to Destroy (2017)
- The Kindergarten Teacher (2018)
- Driveways (2019)

== Personal life ==
Rosenbloom was born July 3, 1964, in New York City. His father, Carroll Rosenbloom, was a businessman who, first with the Baltimore Colts and then the Los Angeles Rams, was the winningest owner in NFL history. Following his father's death in 1979, Rosenbloom's mother Georgia Rosenbloom became majority owner of the Rams. She later moved the team to St. Louis. Frontiere died in 2008, at which time Rosenbloom became controlling owner of the team. The family sold the majority interest in the team to Stan Kroenke at the end of the 2010 season.

Rosenbloom has been active in social justice, and was a signatory of Russell Simmons' letter to the President calling on the Federal Government to reform the mandatory minimum sentencing guidelines. He and his wife Kathleen were the seed financers behind the awareness campaign to help change these laws with Families Against Mandatory Minimums. Rosenbloom and his wife Kathleen are also involved with Feeding America, the Fulfillment Fund, the Variety Club, and Earth Justice - among other charitable organizations.
