= Ann Dowd =

American actress (born 1956)

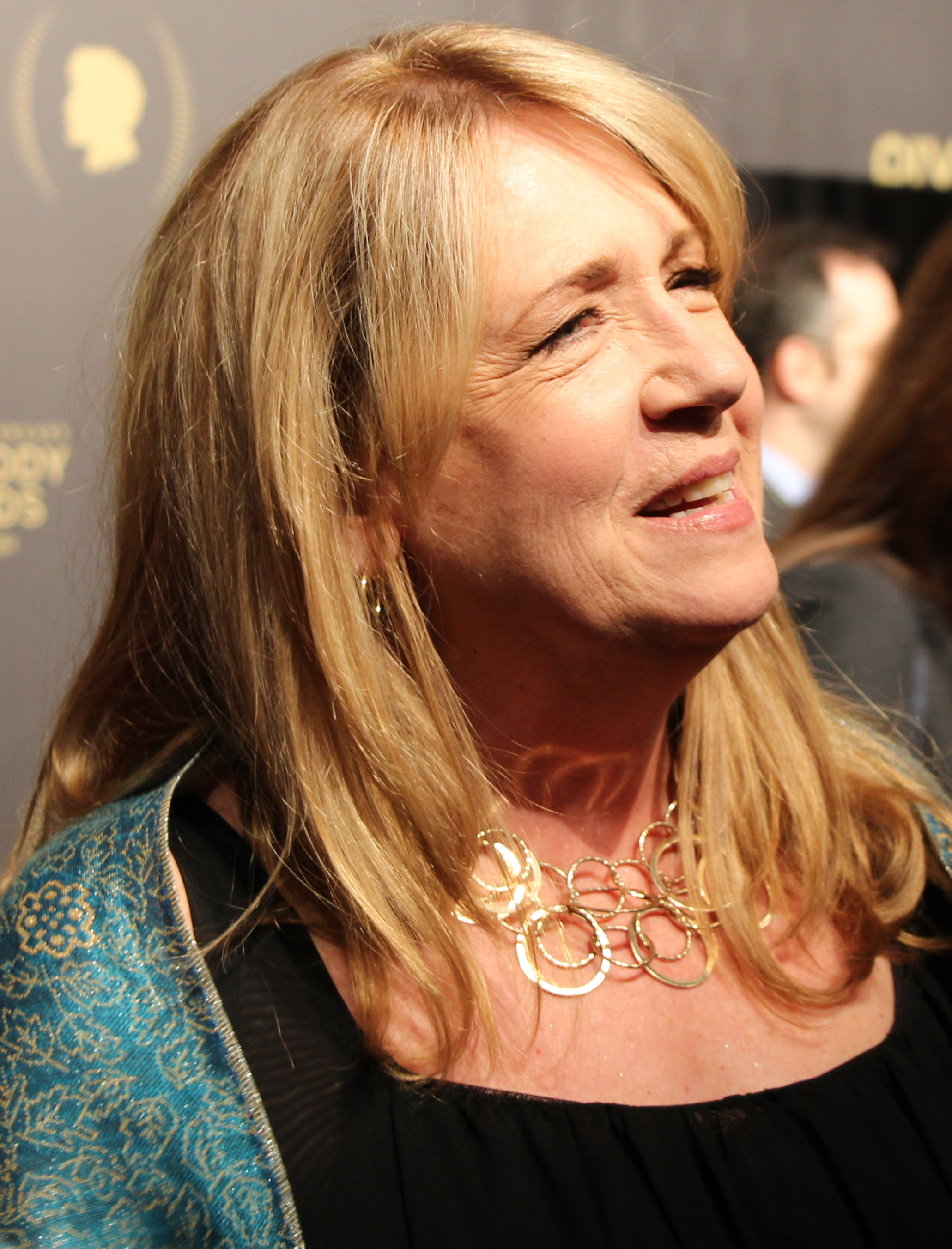
- Dowd at the 2012 Peabody Awards
- Born: January 30, 1956 (age 70); Holyoke, Massachusetts, U.S.
- Education: College of the Holy Cross (BA); DePaul University (MFA)
- Occupation: Actress
- Years active: 1983–present
- Spouse: Lawrence Arancio (m. 1984)
- Children: 3
- Relatives: Kip Dowd (grandfather)
- Awards: Primetime Emmy Award for Outstanding Supporting Actress in a Drama Series (2017)

Ann Dowd (born January 30, 1956) is an American actress. She has appeared in numerous films, including Green Card (1990), Lorenzo's Oil (1992), Philadelphia (1993), Garden State (2004), The Manchurian Candidate (2004), Marley & Me (2008), Compliance (2012), Side Effects (2013), St. Vincent (2014), Captain Fantastic (2016), Hereditary (2018), and Mass (2021). For Compliance, she won the National Board of Review Award for Best Supporting Actress. For Mass, she earned nominations for a British Academy Film Award and a Critics' Choice Award.

Dowd was a series regular on the HBO series The Leftovers (2014–2017), for which she received a Primetime Emmy Award nomination for Outstanding Guest Actress in a Drama Series. She played Aunt Lydia Clements on the Hulu series The Handmaid's Tale (2017–2025), for which she won the Primetime Emmy Award for Outstanding Supporting Actress in a Drama Series.

== Early life and education ==
Dowd was born on January 30, 1956, in Holyoke, Massachusetts. She is of Irish American descent. Her father, John, ran an insurance company, and her mother, Dolores, was a homemaker. She has two brothers and four sisters.

Dowd attended the Williston Northampton School, where she performed in school plays, graduating in 1974. She then attended the College of the Holy Cross in Worcester, Massachusetts, and graduated with a Bachelor of Arts in psychology in 1978. As an undergraduate at Holy Cross, she initially intended to become a surgeon, but decided to pursue acting in her senior year at the encouragement of a professor.

After college, Dowd traveled to New York City to audition for the Goodman School of Drama at DePaul University in Chicago, where she earned a Master of Fine Arts degree in acting in 1982. While at DePaul, Dowd received a prestigious scholarship from the Sarah Siddons Society, an award that had also gone to Carrie Snodgress. Dowd was classmates with Elizabeth Perkins and also worked as a waitress during this time.

== Career ==
=== Film ===
Dowd starred in Shiloh (1997) and its sequels, Shiloh 2: Shiloh Season (1999) and Saving Shiloh (2006) as Louise Preston. She appears in the 1997 cult film All Over Me and in the 1998 film Apt Pupil, in which she played the mother of Brad Renfro's character. Dowd has acted in two films directed by Jonathan Demme, as Jill Beckett, sister of Tom Hanks' character, Andrew Beckett, in Philadelphia (1993), and in The Manchurian Candidate (2004), starring Meryl Streep. Also in 2004, Dowd played the mother of Natalie Portman's character in Garden State and appeared in The Forgotten starring Julianne Moore. In 2005, she starred opposite Gretchen Mol in The Notorious Bettie Page, portraying Edna Page, Bettie Page's mother. She also played the role of Mrs. Strank in the 2006 Clint Eastwood film Flags of Our Fathers.

In 2008, Dowd appeared in Marley & Me starring Jennifer Aniston. She received rave reviews for her work in the 2012 movie Compliance, which premiered at the Sundance Film Festival. In the film, Dowd plays Sandra, a fast food restaurant manager caught in a mysterious ethical nightmare. For this role, Dowd was nominated for an Independent Spirit Award for Best Supporting Actress and received the National Board of Review award. She has played supporting roles in two Steven Soderbergh films, The Informant! in 2009, and Side Effects in 2013, in which she played the mother of Channing Tatum's character. She played the supporting role of Joan in the 2018 horror film Hereditary.

=== Television ===
Dowd's first appearance was in the 1985 television movie First Steps with fellow Chicago actor Megan Mullally. She has appeared in many popular television shows including House and Louie, on both of which she played a nun. Other shows include Chicago Hope, The X-Files, Third Watch, NYPD Blue, Judging Amy and Freaks and Geeks, in which she played the mother of Busy Philipps. Dowd has also appeared in many episodes of the Law & Order franchise. In 1995 she portrayed Rose Long, Louisiana's first female senator, in the television movie Kingfish, opposite John Goodman. In 2008 she appeared in the television movie Taking Chance starring Kevin Bacon. Dowd was a series regular on Nothing Sacred, which was filmed in Los Angeles and aired for one season (97/98), in which she played a nun. For this role she was nominated for a VQT award for Best Supporting Actress. Dowd also co-starred on The Leftovers as Patti Levin, leader of the group The Guilty Remnant. In 2017, Dowd began starring as Aunt Lydia Clements on the Hulu series The Handmaid's Tale, for which she won a Primetime Emmy Award.

In 2021, she was cast as Edna Garrett for the third installment of Live in Front of a Studio Audience on ABC, featuring both Diff'rent Strokes and the spin-off The Facts of Life.

=== Theatre ===
Dowd has appeared on Broadway three times. In 1993 she received the Clarence Derwent Award for her Broadway debut performance in the play Candida starring Mary Steenburgen. She next appeared in Taking Sides (1996) with Elizabeth Marvel, and Vera Farmiga, who was Dowd's understudy. In 2008 she appeared in The Seagull starring Carey Mulligan and Kristin Scott Thomas. Dowd has also won three Jeff Awards for her work in Chicago theatre, including a 1987 Best Supporting Actress award for her role as Emma Brookner in The Normal Heart. In 2007, Dowd played the role of Sister Aloysius in Doubt at the George Street Playhouse. The New York Times described her performance as "chilling" and said she was "masterful in this role." In 2011, Dowd performed Off-Broadway in Blood from a Stone, playing the mother of Ethan Hawke. In 2015, Dowd starred in Naomi Wallace's play Night Is a Room at Signature Theater.

== Personal life ==
Dowd and her husband, Lawrence "Larry" Arancio, both coach acting and are frequent collaborators. Arancio, who is from New York City, is a writer and acting chair for the CAP21 program who has also taught at the HB Studio and Columbia College Chicago. Arancio has worked with Lady Gaga as her acting coach. Dowd and Arancio met while students in Chicago. They have three children, and reside in New York City. Dowd is a foster care advocate. Her alma mater College of the Holy Cross conferred an honorary Doctor of Fine Arts degree on her on May 27, 2016.

== Filmography ==
Key
†	Denotes films that have not yet been released

=== Film ===
Year	Title	Role	Notes
1990	Green Card	Peggy	
1992	Lorenzo's Oil	Pediatrician	
1993	Philadelphia	Jill Beckett	
1994	It Could Happen to You	Carol	
1995	Bushwhacked	Mrs. Patterson	
1996	Shiloh	Louise Preston	
1997	All Over Me	Anne	
1998	Apt Pupil	Monica Bowden	
1999	Shiloh 2: Shiloh Season	Louise Preston	
2004	Garden State	Olivia	
2004	The Manchurian Candidate	Congresswoman Beckett	
2004	The Forgotten	Eileen the Accountant	
2005	The Thing About My Folks	Linda	
2005	The Notorious Bettie Page	Edna Page	
2006	Saving Shiloh	Louise Preston	
2006	Flags of Our Fathers	Mrs. Strank	
2007	Gardener of Eden	Ma Harris	
2007	The Living Wake	Librarian	
2007	The Babysitters	Tammy Lyner	
2007	Alice Upside Down	Aunt Sally	
2008	Familiar Strangers	Dottie Worthington	
2008	Marley & Me	Dr. Platt	
2009	The Informant!	FBI Special Agent Kate Medford	
2009	Taking Chance	Gretchen Phelps Mack	
2011	The Art of Getting By	Mrs. Grimes	
2011	Coming Up Roses	Lynne	
2012	Compliance	Sandra	
2012	Bachelorette	Victoria	
2012	The Discoverers	Patti	
2013	Side Effects	Mrs. Taylor	
2013	Gimme Shelter	Kathy	
2014	The Drop	Dottie Stipler	
2014	St. Vincent	Shirley	
2014	Wildlike	Jeanie	
2015	Our Brand Is Crisis	Nell	
2016	Captain Fantastic	Abigail Bertrang	
2016	The Great & the Small	Detective Dupre	
2016	Norman	Carol Raskin	
2016	Collateral Beauty	Sally Price	
2017	Hedgehog	Joan	
2018	American Animals	Betty Jean "BJ" Gooch	
2018	Nancy	Betty Freeman	
2018	Tyrel	Silvia	
2018	Hereditary	Joan	
2018	A Kid Like Jake	Catherine	
2020	Cowboys	Detective Faith Erickson	
2020	Rebecca	Mrs. Van Hopper	
2021	Mass	Linda	
2022	Family Squares	Judith	
2022	The Independent	Patricia Turnbull	
2023	The Exorcist: Believer	Ann	
2024	The Friend	Marjorie	

=== Television ===
Year	Title	Role	Notes
1985	First Steps	Debby	Television movie
1990	The Baby-Sitters Club	Mrs. Elizabeth Thomas-Brewer	2 episodes
1990	The Days and Nights of Molly Dodd	Nurse Courtney	Episode: "Here's a Rare Photo Opportunity"
1991, 1994, 1996, 2003	Law & Order	Teresa Franz	Episode: "Sonata for Solo Organ"
1991, 1994, 1996, 2003	Law & Order	Dorothy Baxter	Episode: "Breeder"
1991, 1994, 1996, 2003	Law & Order	Patricia Smith	Episode: "Pro Se"
1991, 1994, 1996, 2003	Law & Order	Dr. Beth Allison	Episode: "Compassion"
1994	Heaven & Hell: North & South, Book III	Maureen	3 episodes
1994	The Cosby Mysteries	—N/a	Television movie
1995	Chicago Hope	Eleanor Robertson	Episode: "Growth Pains"
1995	Kingfish: A Story of Huey P. Long	Rose McConnell Long	Television movie
1997–1998	Nothing Sacred	Sister Maureen "Mo" Brody	20 episodes
1999	Providence	Mary	Episode: "Home Again"
1999	The X-Files	Mrs. Reed	Episode: "Rush"
1999–2000	Judging Amy	Mrs. Schleewee	2 episodes
2000	NYPD Blue	Ann Collins	Episode: "Along Came Jones"
2000	Freaks and Geeks	Cookie Kelly	2 episodes
2000	Family Law	—N/a	Episode: "Love and Money"
2000	Baby	Ms. Minifred	Television movie
2000	100 Centre Street	—N/a	Episode: "Queenie's Running"
2001	Amy & Isabelle	Lenora	Television movie
2001	The Division	Sarah	Episode: "Obsessions"
2001, 2003, 2009	Law & Order: Special Victims Unit	Louise Durning	Episode: "Victims"
2001, 2003, 2009	Law & Order: Special Victims Unit	Sally Wilkens	Episode: "Soulless"
2001, 2003, 2009	Law & Order: Special Victims Unit	Lillian Siefeld	Episode: "Lead"
2001–2002	The Education of Max Bickford	Jean	3 episodes
2002–2003	Third Watch	Sgt. Beth Markham	3 episodes
2003	Touched by an Angel	Paula	Episode: "Song for My Father"
2004	The Jury	Evelyn Berry	Episode: "The Honeymoon Suite"
2004	Law & Order: Criminal Intent	Laurie Manotti	Episode: "Inert Dwarf"
2004	House	Mother Superior	Episode: "Damned If You Do"
2005	Law & Order: Trial by Jury	Karen Ames	Episode: "Truth or Consequences"
2009	Taking Chance	Gretchen	Television movie
2010	Louie	Nun	Episode: "God"
2011	Pan Am	Marjorie Lowrey	Episode: "Kiss Kiss Bang Bang"
2013–2014	Masters of Sex	Estabrook Masters	7 episodes
2014	True Detective	Betty Childress	Episode: "Form and Void"
2014	Love's a Bitch	Wes' Mom	Episode: "Family Time"
2014	The Divide	Ida Bankowski	2 episodes
2014	Olive Kitteridge	Bonnie Newton	4 episodes
2014	Big Driver	Ramona Norville	Television movie
2014–2017	The Leftovers	Patti Levin	14 episodes
2016	Quarry	Naomi	4 episodes
2016–2017	Good Behavior	FBI Agent Rhonda Lashever	10 episodes
2017	Girls	Phaedra	Episode: "Goodbye Tour"
2017–2025	The Handmaid's Tale	Aunt Lydia Clements	42 episodes
2018	3Below: Tales of Arcadia	Zeron Omega (voice)	6 episodes
2019	Lambs of God	Sister Margarita	4 episodes
2019–2020	At Home with Amy Sedaris	Teri Tucker	Episode: "Hospital-tality"
2019–2020	At Home with Amy Sedaris	Janice Shanks	Episode: "Signature Dishes"
2020	Helpsters	Marching Band Marsha	Episode: "Primmflandia Day/Marching Band Marsha"
2021	Search Party	Paula Jo	2 episodes
2021	Live in Front of a Studio Audience	Edna Garrett	Episode: "Diff'rent Strokes and The Facts of Life"
2023	American Dad!	Miss Macadoo (voice)	Episode: "Fellow Traveler"
2023	American Dad!	Deborah (voice)	Episode: "Stretched Thin"
2023	The Other Two	Paula Davies	Episode: "Cary Gets His Ass Handed to Him"
2023	Teenage Euthanasia	Erica (voice)	Episode: "Sexually Educated"
2023	Teenage Euthanasia	Debt Announcer (voice)	Episode: "A Very Fantasy Vacation"
2024	Terminator Zero	The Prophet (voice)	3 episodes
2026	The Testaments	Aunt Lydia Clements	Main role
2026	Hacks	Smoker	Episode: "Number One Fan"

=== Theater ===
Year	Title	Role	Notes
1983	A Different Moon	Sarah	Next Theatre Company, Chicago
1986	Uncle Vanya	Sonya	Court Theatre, Chicago
1987	The Normal Heart	Dr. Emma Brookner	Ivanhoe Theatre, Chicago
1988	The Glass Menagerie	Laura Wingfield	Court Theatre, Chicago
1989	The Paper Gramophone	Victoria	Hartford Stage
1989	The Crucible	Abigail Williams	Long Wharf Theatre
1990	New York 1937	Elsie	Jewish Repertory Theatre
1993	Candida	Miss Proserpine Garnett	Criterion Center Stage Right
1996	Taking Sides	Tamara Sachs	Brooks Atkinson Theatre
2001	Kimberly Akimbo	Pattie	South Coast Rep
2001	An Immaculate Misconception	Dr. Melanie Laidlaw	Primary Stages
2004	The Happy Journey	Ma	Connelly Theater
2004	Pullman Car Hiawatha	A Stout Amiable Woman	Connelly Theater
2007	Doubt	Sister Aloysius	George Street Playhouse, New Brunswick
2008	The Seagull	Polina	Walter Kerr Theatre
2009	Quartermaine's Terms	Melanie Garth	Williamstown Theatre Festival
2011	Blood from a Stone	Margaret	Acorn Theatre
2015	Night Is a Room	Dore	Pershing Square Signature Center
2021	Enemy of the People	Various	Park Avenue Armory

== Awards and nominations ==
Year	Association	Category	Nominated work	Result	Ref.
1998	Viewers for Quality Television	Best Supporting Actress in a Quality Drama Series	Nothing Sacred	Nominated	
2012	Dallas–Fort Worth Film Critics Association	Best Supporting Actress	Compliance	Nominated	
2012	National Board of Review	Best Supporting Actress	Compliance	Won	
2012	St. Louis Film Critics Association	Best Supporting Actress	Compliance	Won	
2012	Utah Film Critics Association	Best Supporting Actress	Compliance	Nominated	
2012	Alliance of Women Film Journalists	Best Breakthrough Performance	Compliance	Nominated	
2013	Critics' Choice Movie Awards	Best Supporting Actress	Compliance	Nominated	
2013	Independent Spirit Award	Best Supporting Female	Compliance	Nominated	
2013	Online Film Critics Society	Best Supporting Actress	Compliance	Nominated	
2013	Saturn Awards	Best Actress	Compliance	Nominated	
2013	Toronto Film Critics Association	Best Supporting Actress	Compliance	Nominated	
2014	Satellite Award	Best Supporting Actress – Series, Miniseries or Television Film	The Leftovers	Nominated	
2016	Screen Actors Guild Awards	Outstanding Performance by a Cast in a Motion Picture	Captain Fantastic	Nominated	
2016	Critics' Choice Television Award	Best Supporting Actress in a Drama Series	The Leftovers	Nominated	
2017	Primetime Emmy Award	Outstanding Guest Actress in a Drama Series	The Leftovers	Nominated	
2017	Primetime Emmy Award	Outstanding Supporting Actress in a Drama Series	The Handmaid's Tale	Won	
2017	Golden Globe Award	Best Supporting Actress – Series, Miniseries or Television Film	The Handmaid's Tale	Nominated	
2017	Screen Actors Guild Award	Outstanding Performance by an Ensemble in a Drama Series	The Handmaid's Tale	Nominated	
2018	Critics' Choice Television Award	Best Supporting Actress in a Drama Series	The Handmaid's Tale	Won	
2018	Screen Actors Guild Awards	Outstanding Performance by an Ensemble in a Drama Series	The Handmaid's Tale	Nominated	
2018	Satellite Awards	Best Supporting Actress in a Series, Miniseries or TV Film	The Handmaid's Tale	Won	
2018	Primetime Emmy Award	Outstanding Supporting Actress in a Drama Series	The Handmaid's Tale	Nominated	
2019	AACTA Awards	Best Lead Actress in a Television Drama	Lambs of God	Nominated	
2019	Screen Actors Guild Awards	Outstanding Performance by an Ensemble in a Drama Series	The Handmaid's Tale	Nominated	
2021	Primetime Emmy Awards	Outstanding Supporting Actress in a Drama Series	The Handmaid's Tale	Nominated	
2021	Middleburg Film Festival	Agnès Varda Trailblazing Film Artist Award		Won	
2022	British Academy Film Awards	Best Actress in a Supporting Role	Mass	Nominated	
2022	Critics' Choice Awards	Best Supporting Actress	Mass	Nominated	
2022	Vancouver Film Critics Circle	Best Supporting Actress	Mass	Nominated	
2022	Atlanta Film Critics Circle	Best Ensemble	Mass	Won	
2022	Critics Association of Central Florida	Best Supporting Actress	Mass	Won	
2022	Florida Film Critics Circle	Best Ensemble	Mass	Won	
2022	Houston Film Critics Society	Best Supporting Actress	Mass	Won	
2022	Independent Spirit Awards	Robert Altman Award	Mass	Won	
2022	Indiana Film Journalists Association	Best Ensemble Acting	Mass	Won	
2022	Kansas City Film Critics Circle	Best Supporting Actress	Mass	Won	
2022	Music City Film Critics Association	Best Supporting Actress	Mass	Won	
2022	North Carolina Film Critics Association	Best Supporting Actress	Mass	Won	
2022	North Carolina Film Critics Association	Best Ensemble	Mass	Won	
2022	Online Association of Female Film Critics	Best Acting Ensemble	Mass	Won	
2022	Phoenix Film Critics Society	Best Ensemble Acting	Mass	Won	
2022	St. Louis Gateway Film Critics Association Awards	Best Supporting Actress	Mass	Won	
2022	St. Louis Gateway Film Critics Association Awards	Best Ensemble	Mass	Won	
2022	Utah Film Critics Association	Best Supporting Actress	Mass	Won	
2022	Washington D.C. Area Film Critics Association	Best Ensemble	Mass	Won	
2022	Alliance of Women Film Journalists	Best Supporting Actress	Mass	Nominated	
2022	Austin Film Critics Association	Best Supporting Actress	Mass	Nominated	
2022	DiscussingFilm Critics Awards	Best Supporting Actress	Mass	Runner-up	
2022	Georgia Film Critics Association	Best Supporting Actress	Mass	Nominated	
2022	Greater Western New York Film Critics Association Awards	Best Supporting Actress	Mass	Nominated	
2022	Las Vegas Film Critics Society	Best Supporting Actress	Mass	Nominated	
2022	North Texas Film Critics Association	Gary Murray Award (Best Ensemble)	Mass	Nominated	
2022	Online Association of Female Film Critics	Best Supporting Actress	Mass	Nominated	
2022	San Diego Film Critics Society Awards	Best Supporting Actress	Mass	Nominated	
2022	Seattle Film Critics Society	Best Supporting Actress	Mass	Nominated	
2022	Southeastern Film Critics Association	Best Ensemble	Mass	Nominated	
2022	Washington D.C. Area Film Critics Association	Best Supporting Actress	Mass	Nominated	
