= Tommy Swerdlow =

American actor and screenwriter (born 1962)

Tommy Swerdlow (born 1962) is an American screenwriter, actor, and director. He has appeared in such films as Howard the Duck (1986) and Spaceballs (1987) and co-wrote the screenplays of Cool Runnings (1993), Little Giants (1994), and Snow Dogs (2002). Swerdlow made his directorial debut with the 2017 feature A Thousand Junkies. He has also written a biopic about the life of Matisyahu titled King Without a Crown.

== Filmography ==
=== Actor ===
- The Wild Life (1984) - Dork
- Real Genius (1985) - Bodie
- Howard the Duck (1986) - Ginger Moss
- Spaceballs (1987) - Troop Leader
- Hamburger Hill (1987) - Pvt. Martin Bienstock
- Child's Play (1988) - Detective Jack Santos
- Blueberry Hill (1988) - Ray Porter
- A Thousand Junkies (2017) - Tommy

=== Screenwriter ===
- Cool Runnings (1993)
- Little Giants (1994)
- Bushwhacked (1995)
- Snow Dogs (2002)
- A Thousand Junkies (2017)
- The Grinch (2018)
- Puss in Boots: The Last Wish (2022)

=== Director ===
- A Thousand Junkies (2017)
