= Legacy Releasing =

American film distributor

- Type: Independent
- Industry: film distribution
- Founded: 1996; United States
- Founder: Mark Borde
- Defunct: 1999
- Fate: Merged and consolidated into Warner Home Video
- Successor: Warner Home Video
- Headquarters: California
- Parent: Warner Home Video

Legacy Releasing was an independent film distribution company based in California. It was founded in 1996 by Mark Borde and J. David Williams, veterans in the motion picture industry.

The company's first two releases, Once Upon a Time...When We Were Colored and Robert Wuhl's Open Season, were shown at the Cannes Film Festival the same year it was established. Afterwards, it became a leader in independent distribution, releasing an average of 15 films per year.

Notable films from the company included Little Men, Wedding Bell Blues, The Swan Princess: Escape from Castle Mountain, Shiloh (and its sequel, Shiloh Season), and an animated version of Pippi Longstocking.

None of Legacy's output was successful financially. Its highest-grossing film, When We Were Colored, took close to $2.3 million at the U.S. box office. However, the home video business was booming at the time and was the economic engine of this company.

In 1999, Legacy went out of business, and was successfully merged and consolidated into Warner Home Video. Borde went on to become co-president of another company, the short-lived Independent Artists. As of 2006, Legacy's official site (legacyfilms.com) no longer exists.

Borde is now the head of Freestyle Releasing. Williams is now the CEO of Marble Arch Entertainment.

== Filmography ==
Title	Release date	Distributing Partner
Once Upon a Time...When We Were Colored	January 26, 1996	Republic Pictures
Open Season	May 3, 1996	Republic Pictures
A Season in Purgatory	May 5, 1996	Republic Pictures
Rumpelstiltskin	May 17, 1996	Republic Pictures
Lover's Knot	July 12, 1996	Cabin Fever Entertainment
Killer: A Journal of Murder	September 6, 1996	Republic Pictures
Somebody to Love	September 27, 1996	Cabin Fever Entertainment
Cadillac Ranch	October 10, 1996	BMG Independents
Santa with Muscles	November 8, 1996	Cabin Fever Entertainment
Adrenalin: Fear the Rush	November 29, 1996	Dimension Films
The Wind in the Willows	December 16, 1996	GoodTimes Entertainment
Shiloh	April 27, 1997	Warner Bros.
Wedding Bell Blues	June 13, 1997	BMG Independents
Hands on a Hardbody: The Documentary	June 1997	
Digging to China	July 16, 1997	
The Swan Princess: Escape from Castle Mountain	July 18, 1997	Warner Bros. Columbia TriStar (currently)
Pippi Longstocking	August 22, 1997	Warner Bros.
Love Always	October 10, 1997	
Kiss & Tell	October 17, 1997	Republic Pictures
Grizzly Mountain	October 31, 1997	LIVE Entertainment/Hemdale Communications
The Only Thrill	March 6, 1998	
A Rat's Tale	March 20, 1998	Warner Bros.
Eden	March 27, 1998	BMG Independents
Little Men	May 8, 1998	Warner Bros.
Plump Fiction	May 15, 1998	Rhino Entertainment
The Mighty Kong	June 16, 1998	Warner Bros.
Hands on a Hard Body: The Documentary	July 10, 1998	
Rudolph the Red-Nosed Reindeer: The Movie	October 16, 1998	GoodTimes Entertainment
Thursday	November 13, 1998	PolyGram Filmed Entertainment
Eight Days a Week	February 26, 1999	
Clubland	April 16, 1999	
Shiloh 2: Shiloh Season	July 2, 1999	Warner Bros.
Simon Sez	September 24, 1999	Columbia Pictures
Trois	February 11, 2000	Rainforest Films
Family Tree	April 21, 2000	WarnerVision Entertainment
