= Bushwhacked (film) =

1995 film by Greg Beeman

- Theatrical release poster
- Directed by: Greg Beeman
- Written by: John Jordan; Danny Byers; Tommy Swerdlow; Michael Goldberg
- Produced by: Charles B. Wessler; Paul Schiff
- Starring: Daniel Stern; Jon Polito; Brad Sullivan; Ann Dowd; Anthony Heald
- Cinematography: Theo van de Sande
- Edited by: Ross Albert
- Music by: Bill Conti
- Production company: Fox Family Films
- Distributed by: 20th Century Fox
- Release date: August 4, 1995
- Running time: 90 minutes
- Country: United States
- Language: English
- Box office: $7.9 million (U.S. only)

Bushwhacked is a 1995 American adventure comedy film starring Daniel Stern, Jon Polito, Anthony Heald and Brad Sullivan. Directed by Greg Beeman, it was his last theatrical film before he moved on to direct television films for Disney Channel beginning in 1997. This also marked Sullivan's last theatrical film appearance before his retirement in 2000 and death in 2008.

This follows a deliveryman (Stern) in charge as a scout master to interact with the young scouts for camping in order to hide away from authorities for money laundering.

== Plot ==
Deliveryman "Mad" Max Grabelski (Daniel Stern) is charged with delivering packages to millionaire Reinhart Bragdon (Anthony Heald) for $50 tips. During a late night delivery, Max accidentally stumbles across a fire in Bragdon's mansion and is cornered by FBI Agent Palmer (Jon Polito), but accidentally picks up Agent Palmer's gun and manages to escape. Max later sees a news report in which Palmer claims that Bragdon was killed in the fire, which was set up by Max to stop him from exposing a money-laundering conspiracy. Now on the run from the law, Max contacts his boss and learns that a final package is to be delivered to Bragdon, but at his mountain cabin in Devil's Peak.

Max heads for Devil's Peak to clear his name, but a store clerk and scoutmaster Jack Erickson (Brad Sullivan) recognizes his face and he is forced to threaten both with his gun, gluing Erickson to his car's steering wheel and ordering him to drive off to lure the police away while stealing Erickson's van. He is subsequently mistaken for a scoutmaster scheduled to lead a group of Ranger Scouts (consisting of five boys and one girl) on an expedition. Max goes along with the ruse to keep heading for Devil's Peak. The FBI find and release Erickson, and set up a base of operations at a nearby cabin while Palmer and Erickson pursue Max and the scouts. Though they are nearly captured, Max cuts the bridge between two cliffs, forcing Palmer and Erickson to take the longer route.

Along the way, the scouts become curious of Max's unorthodox capabilities as a scout leader. They build a makeshift radio and learn who Max truly is. They lace his water with sleeping pills and use smoke signs to signal their location to Erickson. Max ends up sedated, but Palmer handcuffs Erickson to a tree and captures Max alone, promising the scouts a rescue helicopter, but the suspicious scouts follow in secret. Max awakens and Palmer leads him to a helicopter, where Max discovers Bragdon is alive; he then reveals that he is a criminal and that Palmer is one of his henchman posing an FBI agent and their plan was to steal the laundered money from the authorities and Bragdon faking his death after coming under suspicion in order to frame Max. Before they can kill Max, the scouts intervene and knock Palmer out, but Max falls into the river and the scouts follow to rescue him and escape the criminals. They reach safety before going over a waterfall and throw their backpacks in the river to drive Palmer and Bragdon off. Out of supplies, the scouts decide to remain with Max, accepting him as their scout leader and help him reach Devil's Peak. Meanwhile, one of the scouts' mothers, Mrs. Patterson (Ann Dowd) uncovers Max's discarded tissue and realizes that he is leading them to Devil's Peak, and gives chase in her van when Palmer's bumbling assistant, Agent McMurrey (Thomas Mills Wood), refuses to help her. She arrives first, but is captured by Bragdon.

After scaling the treacherous mountainside, Max and the scouts finally arrive as Bragdon receives the final package. Palmer catches up and prepares to kill them, but is subdued by Erickson, who freed himself and followed Max. Erickson tells Max that he needs to have a serious talk with him for taking the scouts in his place, Max sneaks into the cabin to free Mrs. Patterson while Erickson and the scouts glue Palmer to a tree as payback for handcuffing Erickson to the tall tree. Bragdon appears and forces Max and Mrs. Peterson to the edge of the cliff at gunpoint. Mrs. Patterson's son, Gordy (Blake Bashoff), charges Bragdon but falls over a cliff and hangs onto a branch for his life. Max knocks Bragdon out by punching his dentures out of his mouth and climbs down the cliff and pulls Gordy to safety just before the branch falls away.

With Bragdon and Palmer captured, Max's name is cleared and in response to his efforts, he is awarded a Ranger Scout Leader honor and given charge of an even bigger group of scouts for a more challenging mission, much to his surprise and chagrin.

== Cast ==
- Daniel Stern as "Mad" Max Grabelski
- Jon Polito as Agent Palmer
- Brad Sullivan as Jack Erickson
- Ann Dowd as Agatha (Aggie) Patterson
- Anthony Heald as Reinhart Bragdon
- Tom Wood as Agent McMurrey
- Blake Bashoff as Gordy Patterson
- Corey Carrier as Ralph
- Michael Galeota as Dana Jareki
- Max Goldblatt as Barnhill
- Ari Greenberg as Milton Fishman
- Janna Michaels as Kelsey Jordan
- Michael P. Byrne as Mr. Fishman
- Natalie West as Mrs. Fishman
- Michael O'Neill as Jon Jordan
- Jane Morris as Beth Jordan
- Paul Ben-Victor as Dana's father
- Art Evans as Marty

== Production ==
The Farrelly brothers had written the original script under the name "Tenderfoot". The script began development at 20th Century Fox, with Charles Wessler (who worked with the Farrellys on Dumb and Dumber) attached as producer, but the Farrellys took their names off when the script was changed; Wessler stayed on the project. According to Stern, after test screenings, the film's title was changed from Tenderfoot to Bushwhacked.

According to an IMDb trivia page, the film was originally conceived as a spin-off to the Home Alone franchise, with Stern set to reprise his role as Marv Murchins.

== Critical response ==
The film received a 22% rating on Rotten Tomatoes based on 23 reviews. It grossed $7.9 million in the United States.
