= Alice Upside Down =

- DVD cover
- Directed by: Sandy Tung
- Screenplay by: Sandy Tung; Meghan Heritage
- Story by: Sandy Tung; Meghan Heritage; Declan O'Brien
- Based on: Alice series by Phyllis Reynolds Naylor
- Produced by: Dale Rosenbloom; Carl Borack; Sandy Tung; Declan O'Brien
- Starring: Alyson Stoner; Lucas Grabeel; Bridgit Mendler; Luke Perry; Penny Marshall; Ashley Eckstein
- Cinematography: Mark Mervis
- Edited by: Clarinda Wong
- Music by: Adam Gorgoni
- Production companies: Open Pictures; Avondale Entertainment Group
- Distributed by: Anchor Bay Entertainment
- Release date: October 6, 2007
- Running time: 90 minutes
- Country: United States
- Language: English

Alice Upside Down is a 2007 comedy-drama film, based on the Alice series written by Phyllis Reynolds Naylor. The film was shot at Bishop DuBourg High School in St. Louis, Missouri. Screened in limited cinema in 2007, it was released wide straight-to-DVD on July 29, 2008. In North America, it aired on Starz Kids & Family, but in the early years, it was on demand. The film centers on Alice, an 11-year-old girl starting the sixth grade at a new school. It starred Alyson Stoner, Lucas Grabeel, Bridgit Mendler, Luke Perry, Penny Marshall, and Ashley Eckstein.

== Plot ==
Alice McKinley (Alyson Stoner) is an 11-year-old girl who is facing many challenges. Her mother, Marie McKinley, presumably died unknown when she was very young, so she never really got to know her. She lives with her brother Lester (Lucas Grabeel) and her father, Ben (Luke Perry). The family moves to a new house, and soon meet their new neighbors, a girl Alice's age named Elizabeth (Parker McKenna Posey) and her mother. The next day Alice goes to school with Elizabeth and runs into a boy named Patrick (Dylan McLaughlin), whom she accidentally walked in on in a dressing room a few days earlier in his underwear. They line up to find their teachers, and Alice wants to be in beautiful Miss Cole's (Ashley Eckstein) class. Instead, she winds up with the seemingly evil and strict (but actually caring) Mrs. Plotkin (Penny Marshall), who gives her a hard time. Alice tries out for a play that Miss Cole's class is directing, and really wants the princess role. However, she is tone-deaf (although her dad is a musician), so she doesn't get the part. Her arch rival Pamela (Bridgit Mendler) gets the role instead, and Alice lands the role of a frog. Pamela hasn't been very nice to Alice ever since she came to school. Alice tells her dad and brother about it, but they end up being discouraging. Her dad opens a new shop, and Alice tries to set up her dad and Miss Cole up, as she's searching for a mother figure to replace the one she lost, but her dad says she is too young for him. Then her dad starts dating a new girl, Kelly, (Jilanne Klaus) and Alice is afraid her father will marry her. One night, Alice sneaks downstairs and sees her father and Kelly kissing, and it really hurts her. Her Aunt Sally (Ann Dowd), who is her mother's older sister, and her husband come to visit. Their father finds Aunt Sally annoying, as she thinks they can't take care of themselves. During the visit, Alice finds a video of her mother, and later watches the video. Her father reprimands her when he finds out, saying that those videos were private. Back at school, Alice slowly begins to bond with Mrs. Plotkin, and finds that she isn't as bad as everyone believes she is. She also realizes that Miss Cole isn't "all that". On the night of the play, Alice accidentally tears down the set, and everyone is upset at her, including Miss Cole. They tell her to leave, but Mrs. Plotkin consoles her. After the play, everyone apologizes, even Pamela. At the end of the film, Pamela and Alice are friends, Patrick asks Alice out, which leads to her having a daydream about her and Patrick kissing, and Lester is seen playing with his band, the Naked Nomads.

== Cast ==
- Alyson Stoner as Alice McKinley
- Lucas Grabeel as Lester McKinley
- Bridgit Mendler as Pamela Jones
- Dylan McLaughlin as Patrick Loughton
- Parker McKenna Posey as Elizabeth "Liz" Price
- Luke Perry as Ben McKinley
- Ann Dowd as Aunt Sally McKinley
- Ashley Eckstein as Mrs. Cole
- Penny Marshall as Mrs. Plotkin
- Boris Kodjoe as Mr. Edgecomb

== Soundtrack ==
Alice Upside Down is a soundtrack album from the film of the same name, released on September 16, 2008 by Dauman Music and distributed by Federal Distribution.

=== Track listing ===
No.	Title	Performer(s)	Length
1.	"Lost and Found"	Alyson Stoner	3:42
2.	"Gotta Rock"	Lucas Grabeel	3:34
3.	"Jenny Got A Fever"	Lucas Grabeel	3:50
4.	"Good Time"	Eliot Sloan	2:46
5.	"Something Out Of Nothing"	Lost Tricks	2:44
6.	"Wrap Around"	Dayna Lane	2:37
7.	"Starting Over"	Jordan John	2:53
8.	"If You Didn't Care"	Dayna Lane	4:06
9.	"Free Spirit" (backing vocals by Bridgit Mendler)	Alyson Stoner	3:33
10.	"Higher" (DJ Scotty K Mix)	Tiffany	6:49

== Reception ==
A critic from The Hollywood Reporter wrote, "Alice Upside Down is a Disney Channel-ready tween comedy-drama that’s nicely anchored by an affable cast".

== Home media ==
The film was released directly to DVD on July 29, 2008.
