= Hatching Pete =

2009 television film directed by Stuart Gillard

- Promotional poster
- Written by: Paul W. Cooper
- Directed by: Stuart Gillard
- Starring: Jason Dolley; Mitchel Musso; Tiffany Thornton; Josie Loren; Sean O'Bryan; Amy Farrington; Crawford Wilson; Aramis Knight; Edward Herrmann; Brian Stepanek
- Music by: Nathan Wang
- Country of origin: United States
- Original language: English

Production
- Producer: Stuart Gillard
- Cinematography: Gordon C. Lonsdale
- Editor: Robin Russell
- Running time: 89 minutes
- Production companies: Just Singer Entertainment; Salty Pictures

Original release
- Network: Disney Channel
- Release: April 24, 2009

Hatching Pete is a 2009 American comedy film released as a Disney Channel Original Movie. It first aired on April 24, 2009, on Disney Channel UK and later Disney Channel and Family. It was released on DVD in America on May 12, 2009, together with Dadnapped.

== Plot ==
Brewster High School student Pete Ivey finds that Cammie Poole, his crush, has already been asked out by Dill Jensen, the captain of the basketball team. At home, Pete's father tells him that to get Cammie's attention he has to give her something to notice.

On their way to the Brewster High basketball game, Cammie's brother and Pete's best friend, Cleatus Poole, comes over to ask Pete for a favor. Cleatus is the Brewster High mascot, but he has discovered he is allergic to the suit. He pleads for Pete to wear the chicken suit instead. As part of the bargain, Cleatus tells Pete he will get a date with his sister. After a rocky start, Pete realizes that he is attracting Cammie's attention and acts more adventurously inside the suit. Upon seeing his own new-found natural talent for being mascot, Pete agrees to be "The Chicken" full-time. Meanwhile, Pete develops a crush on cheerleader Angela Morrisey. They are both chosen for the parade float committee and become friends while working together on the float.

On the day of the parade, the town shows up for the festival and "The Chicken" is a big hit. During a dance number however, Cleatus is accidentally discovered. Pete, escaping the crowd, steals the sheriff's car to get away. Angela sees him walking and offers him a ride. Angela expresses relief that "The Chicken" is not Cleatus because of her developing romantic feelings for whoever is inside. Based on the adoration that the town shares for "The Chicken" and due to the financial incentives of having people attending the games, the sheriff decides to drop the charges.

Pete returns during the final game to rally both the players and the crowd. During a time out, Pete removes the mascot head at the urging of the audience. Cleatus congratulates him for his talent as the chicken and the audience cheers for him as well as Pete's parents, who express how proud they are of their son. The team finishes with a last second score to win the game, and when the cheerleaders tumble in their celebration, Angela falls on Pete and they kiss. Cleatus tells Pete to put his chicken head back on and join the Brewster Roosters to celebrate their only win of the year.

== Cast ==
- Jason Dolley as Pete Ivey, the main protagonist who became the school's mascot "The Chicken"
- Mitchel Musso as Cleatus Poole, Pete's goofy best friend who is allergic to the Chicken mascot suit
- Tiffany Thornton as Jamie Wynn, the head cheerleader and Poole's crush
- Josie Loren as Angela Morrissey, a kind cheerleader and Pete's love interest
- Sean O'Bryan as Leon Ivey, Pete's father who loves the Chicken mascot
- Amy Farrington as Doris Ivey, Pete's mother who loves the Chicken mascot
- Crawford Wilson as Dil Jensen, the basketball team captain and Cammie's boyfriend
- Aramis Knight as Wendell Pate, a boy who was in the town parade dressed as a small Chick
- Edward Herrmann as Principal Fred Daly
- Brian Stepanek as Coach Mackey
- Madison Riley as Cammie Poole, Poole's older sister on the cheerleading team and Dil's girlfriend
- David Nibley as Jack Poole, Cammie and Cleatus's father

== Reception ==
The premiere of the movie was viewed by 4.1 million viewers, becoming the third Disney movie in three years with less than 5 million viewers for the premiere.

David Nusair called the movie (along with Dadnapped) "typically underwhelming Disney Channel fare."
