= Brad Sullivan =

American actor (1931–2008)

- Born: Bradford Ernest Sullivan; November 18, 1931; Chicago, Illinois, U.S.
- Died: December 31, 2008 (aged 77)
- Occupation: Actor
- Years active: 1972–2000

Bradford Ernest Sullivan (November 18, 1931 – December 31, 2008) was an American character actor on film, stage and television. He was best known for playing the killer Cole in The Sting, hockey goon Mo Wanchuk in Slap Shot, mobster George in The Untouchables (1987) and the gruff Henry Wingo in The Prince of Tides (1991).

== Biography ==
=== Early life and career ===
Born in Chicago, Illinois, the son of Winthrop Sullivan and Margaret Schroeder Sullivan, Brad Sullivan served in the U.S. Army during the Korean War. He also attended the University of Maine, and later received his bachelor's degree in agriculture. After touring with a stage company, he moved to New York City and studied at the American Theatre Wing. He made his Off-Broadway debut in Red Roses for Me in 1961, and went on to appear in the London company of the musical South Pacific.

In the 1960s and early 1970s, he appeared in two productions of the New York Shakespeare Festival — Coriolanus at Central Park's Delacorte Theatre (1965), and Václav Havel's The Memorandum. In 1971, he starred as Rip Cord opposite Adrienne Barbeau as Cookie Kovac in the David Newbburge-Jacques Urbont musical Stag Movie. Theater critic Clive Barnes in The New York Times called the two "quite jolly" and that they "deserve to be congratulated on the lack of embarrassment they show when, on occasion, they have to wander around stark naked. They may not be sexy but they certainly keep cheerful."

In 1972, he made his feature film debut in the military drama Parades (1972; re-released as The Line, 1980). This was followed by an appearance in a CBS TV-movie adaptation of David Rabe's Sticks and Bones, a black comedy about a Vietnam War veteran. The subject matter proved so controversial that half of the network's affiliates refused to broadcast the telefilm.

=== Success as character actor ===
Sullivan was then featured prominently in director George Roy Hill's hit The Sting (1973), playing Cole, the hired killer who dogs the Robert Redford and Paul Newman characters. Following roles in other productions, Sullivan reteamed with star Newman and director Hill for Slap Shot (1977), a hit comedy about a down-and-out hockey team. In a departure from the stoic, taciturn parts in which he was often cast, Sullivan played a spectacularly vulgar hockey player, Morris "Mo" Wanchuk.

He followed this with his Broadway debut, playing three different military officers in a revival of David Rabe's play The Basic Training of Pavlo Hummel (April–September 1977), starring Al Pacino. The following year, Sullivan earned a Drama Desk Award nomination for Outstanding Featured Actor in a Musical for his performance as steelworker Mike LeFevre in Working (May–June 1978), adapted from the book by Studs Terkel and also starring Patti LuPone and Joe Mantegna. He would go on to do four other Broadway plays: Beth Henley's The Wake of Jamey Foster (October 1982), with Holly Hunter; a Circle in the Square revival of The Caine Mutiny Court Martial (May–November 1983); Peter Hall's revival of Tennessee Williams's Orpheus Descending (September–December 1989), as Jabe Torrance opposite Vanessa Redgrave's Lady Torrance (both recreating their roles in the TNT cable network's adaptation); and a stage version of the movie On the Waterfront (May 1995).

Sullivan's other feature film credits include Walk Proud (1979), The Island (1980); Ghost Story (1981); Tin Men (1987); The Untouchables (1987); Funny Farm (1988); Dead Bang (1989); The Dream Team (1989); The Abyss (1989); Guilty by Suspicion (1991); True Colors (1991), The Prince of Tides (1991); Sister Act 2: Back in the Habit (1993); The Fantasticks (made 1995, released 2000); The Jerky Boys: The Movie (1995); Canadian Bacon (1995); and Bushwhacked (1995). Of his role as a harsh husband in The Prince of Tides, in which his unwary character is given dog food to eat and consumes it with gusto, Sullivan told an interviewer he was never quite sure if the contents of a can served him by Kate Nelligan, who played his wife, was actually dog food. He added, however, that as an actor he did not believe in questioning a director, and that whatever it was tasted fine.

On television, Sullivan portrayed Artemas Ward in 1984 miniseries George Washington, and Judge Roy Bean in the 1991 television movie The Gambler Returns: The Luck of the Draw. Additional television credits include Miami Vice, The Equalizer, Against the Law, and Best of the West. He had recurring roles on I'll Fly Away, as Mr. Zollicofer Weed, the ex-Marine turned wrestling coach, and NYPD Blue, as Patsy Ferrara, a retired prizefighter who taught Bobby Simone about keeping birds. As a cast member of the drama Nothing Sacred (1997–1998), he played Father Leo, the older priest who helps guide his younger colleagues. His final TV role was on a 2000 episode of Law & Order.

Other theater work includes the Off-Broadway plays The Ballad of Soapy Smith by Michael Weller (1984) and Neal Bell's Cold Sweat (1988) at Playwrights Horizons.

== Personal life and death ==
Sullivan lived on the Upper West Side of Manhattan. He died on December 31, 2008, aged 77, of cancer.

== Filmography ==
=== Film ===
- Parades (1972) – Sergeant Hook
- The Sting (1973) – Cole
- Slap Shot (1977) – Mo Wanchuk
- Walk Proud (1979) – Jerry Kelsey
- The Island (1980) – Stark
- Ghost Story (1981) – Sheriff Hardesty
- Cold River (1982) – Reuban Knat
- The New Kids (1985) – Colonel Jenkins
- Tin Men (1987) – Masters
- The Untouchables (1987) – George
- Funny Farm (1988) – Brock
- Dead Bang (1989) – Chief Hillard
- The Dream Team (1989) – Sgt. Vincente
- Signs of Life (1989) – Lobsterman
- The Abyss (1989) – Executive Officer Everton
- Guilty by Suspicion (1991) – Congressman Velde
- True Colors (1991) – FBI Agent Abernathy
- The Prince of Tides (1991) – Henry Wingo
- Sister Act 2: Back in the Habit (1993) – Father Thomas
- The Fantasticks (1995) – Ben Hucklebee
- The Jerky Boys: The Movie (1995) – Detective Robert Worzic
- Canadian Bacon (1995) – Gus
- Bushwhacked (1995) – Jack Erickson

=== Television ===
Brad Sullivan television credits
Year	Title	Role	Notes
1973	Sticks and Bones	Father Donald	TV movie
1975	Movin' On	Lt. Hardacre	Episode: "From Baltimore to Eternity"
1981	Best of the West	Lance	Pilot
1982	The Neighborhood	Foreman	TV movie
1984	George Washington	Artemas Ward	TV miniseries
1985-1986	Search for Tomorrow	Harry Maxwell	4 episodes
1986-1989	The Equalizer	Joshua/Luther Munson	2 episodes
1987	Miami Vice	Jack Colman	Episode: "Duty and Honor"
1988	Crossbow	Rafe	Episode: "The Emperor Part 2"
1990	H.E.L.P.	Daly	Episode: "Fire Down Below"
1990	Against the Law	Police Captain	1 episode
1991	The Gambler Returns: The Luck of the Draw	Judge Roy Bean	TV movie
1991–1992	I'll Fly Away	Coach Zollicofer Weed	7 episodes
1991-2000	Law & Order	Joe Anson/Tommy Brannigan	2 episodes
1993	South Beach	Jessie	Episode: "Wild Thing"
1993	Big Wave Dave's	Captain Wally	Episode: "Him"
1995–1998	NYPD Blue	Patsy Ferrara	4 episodes
1997–1998	Nothing Sacred	Father Leo	20 episodes
