= Confessions of a Sexist Pig =

- Directed by: Sandy Tung
- Written by: Sandy Tung
- Produced by: Sandy Tung; Kohlie Frantzen; Dale Rosenbloom
- Starring: Edward Kerr; Traylor Howard; Lauren Graham; Michael Trucco
- Cinematography: Lex du Pont
- Edited by: Farrel Levy
- Music by: Adam Gorgoni
- Release date: 1998
- Running time: 91 minutes
- Country: United States
- Language: English

Confessions of a Sexist Pig is a 1998 American independent romantic comedy starring Edward Kerr and Traylor Howard. It was directed and written by Sandy Tung. It won Best Feature Film at the New Orleans International Film Festival, and the Werner Fassbinder Award at the Mannheim-Heidelberg International Film Festival.

== Plot ==
A daytime soap opera star has to deal with his sexist ideas when he falls for his new co-star, a woman who seemingly follows his manly ideas about dating.

== Main cast ==
- Edward Kerr – Jack
- Traylor Howard – Anne
- Lauren Graham – Tracy
- Michael Trucco - Troy
- Sal Viscuso – Marty
- Anneliza Scott - Linda
- Steve Monarque - Steve
