= A Thousand Junkies =

- Directed by: Tommy Swerdlow
- Written by: Tommy Swerdlow; T.J. Bowen
- Produced by: John De Menil; Clay Reed; Tommy Swerdlow
- Starring: Tommy Swerdlow
- Cinematography: John De Menil; Warren Hansen
- Edited by: Anisha Acharya; Lee Buckley; James Long; Nathaniel Park
- Music by: Benji Lysaght
- Production company: THI Productions
- Distributed by: Whitewater Films
- Release date: April 22, 2017 (Tribeca)
- Running time: 75 minutes
- Country: United States
- Language: English

A Thousand Junkies is a 2017 American comedy-drama film directed by and starring Tommy Swerdlow. It is Swerdlow's directorial debut.

== Plot ==
One sunny day in Los Angeles, three heroin junkies, Tommy, T.J. and Blake, try to find some heroin so they can get high. Over the course of the day, with impending and growing withdrawal setting in, each character's backstory is explored to a degree as they embark on a seedy Odyssey and increasingly desperate measures to stave off dope sickness.

== Cast ==
- Tommy Swerdlow as Tommy
- T.J. Bowen as T.J.
- Blake Heron as Blake
- Bill Pullman as himself
- Steven Weber as Moshe
- Dinarte de Freitas as Igor
- David Darmstetter as Liquor Store Owner
- Dennice Cisneros as T.J.'s Girlfriend
- Jerry Stahl as Cab Driver
- Karen Swerdlow as Karen
- Lucinda Jenney as Blake's Mom
- Patricia Castelo Branco as Ludmila
