= Dandelion (2004 film) =

- Directed by: Mark Milgard
- Written by: Mark Milgard; Robb Williamson; R. D. Murphy
- Produced by: Molly M. Mayeux
- Starring: Vincent Kartheiser; Blake Heron; Taryn Manning; Arliss Howard; Mare Winningham
- Cinematography: Tim Orr
- Edited by: Amy E. Duddleston
- Music by: Robb Williamson
- Production companies: Ruth Pictures; Ballistic Media Group
- Distributed by: International Film Circuit
- Release dates: January 2004 (Sundance); October 7, 2005 (United States)
- Running time: 93 minutes
- Country: United States
- Language: English

Dandelion is a 2004 drama film directed and co-written by Mark Milgard and stars Vincent Kartheiser, Blake Heron, Taryn Manning, Arliss Howard, and Mare Winningham. The director of photography was Tim Orr. The film premiered at the 2004 Sundance Film Festival and went on to play the festival circuit, screening at the Vienna International Film Festival and the Seattle International Film Festival. It was given a limited release in American theaters on October 7, 2005.

== Plot ==
In a small town of rolling fields and endless skies, isolated 16-year-old Mason Mullich lives in a world where families exist in fragmented silence and love seems to have gone missing. Mason lives with his mother, father and mentally ill uncle. Mason's father is a local politician running for office and is stern, and somewhat abusive towards his family, while his mother is submissive and dutiful, albeit unstable.

While resting in the grass one day Mason is approached by Danny, a sensitive and troubled girl. They strike up a tender friendship and begin to spend more time together. This bond is torn apart when Mason's father kills a man whilst driving and Mason is blamed for the crime. He is sent to prison for two years and upon getting out sees that Danny is now in a relationship. While they are both still attracted to each other, threats from Danny's possessive boyfriend and Danny's own perception of what she deserves pose a conflict.

Through time, they are able to overcome these conflicts and begin some semblance of a relationship. Though Mason's home life is even more unstable and unhappy than before, he find solace in Danny. Eventually on one of their walks they become intimate, solidifying their relationship. Later Mason, Danny and a friend go in a field to drink and have fun. Mason's friend brings narcotics and Danny decides to get high. Later that night she goes into the pond and kills herself. Mason, devastated, is framed for supplying the drugs. In the ending, he makes bail, then escapes by jumping on a freight train.

== Cast ==
- Vincent Kartheiser as Mason Mullich
- Blake Heron as Eddie
- Taryn Manning as Danny Voss
- Arliss Howard as Luke Mullich
- Mare Winningham as Layla Mullich
- Michelle Forbes as Mrs. Voss
- Marshall Bell as Uncle Bobby
- Shawn Reaves as Arlee

== Production ==
The film was shot in Endicott, Washington and Moscow, Idaho, in the Palouse, where Milgard chose to film in June 2002 "to take advantage of the time of year when there is both green and gold colors to the wheat fields."

== Release ==
After the film debuted at Sundance, it went on to play numerous film festivals around the world, including Viennale, the Karlovy Vary International Film Festival, the International Film Festival Rotterdam, the Montreal International Film Festival, the London Film Festival, and the Tokyo International Film Festival.

== Critical reception ==
On review aggregate website Rotten Tomatoes, Dandelion has an approval rating of 62% based on 13 reviews. On Metacritic it has a score of 57 based on 7 reviews.

Scott Foundas of Variety praised the film and said "the trials and tribulations of being a misunderstood teenager in love are rendered with depth." In addition, Foundas praised the cinematography by Tim Orr, writing "the frames of Dandelion are suffused with supernal blood red-orange sunsets and heavenly shadows making their way across great expanses of untouched land." Ken Fox of TV Guide also reviewed the film positively, writing it has "a surprisingly sensitive touch", and concluding, "There's nothing particularly earth-shattering about this gentle drama — there are no shocking revelations, no sudden explosions of violence — but Milgard has an unerring sense for the quietly dramatic."
