= Across the Tracks =

1991 film by Sandy Tung

- Directed by: Sandy Tung
- Written by: Sandy Tung
- Produced by: Francesca Bill; Nancy Paloian; Dale Rosenbloom; Robert A. Schacht
- Starring: Rick Schroder; Brad Pitt; Carrie Snodgress
- Cinematography: Michael Delahoussaye
- Edited by: Farrel Levy
- Music by: Joel Goldsmith
- Production companies: Desert Productions; Rosenbloom Entertainment; Tung Films
- Distributed by: Academy Entertainment
- Release date: February 15, 1991
- Running time: 100 minutes
- Country: United States
- Language: English

Across the Tracks is a 1991 American drama film about track and field directed and written by Sandy Tung. It stars Rick Schroder, Brad Pitt, Carrie Snodgress, and David Anthony Marshall.

== Plot ==
Joe Maloney (Brad Pitt) is a straight A student vying for an athletic scholarship to Stanford University. He lives with his mother (Carrie Snodgress) in a trailer park in Gardena, CA. His well laid plans for the future are thrown into turmoil when his troubled younger brother Billy (Rick Schroder) is released from a juvenile detention facility following his arrest for stealing a car and comes to live with them back home.

== Cast ==
- Rick Schroder as Billy Maloney
- Brad Pitt as Joe Maloney
- Carrie Snodgress as Rosemary Maloney
- David Anthony Marshall as Louie
- Thomas Mikal Ford as Coach Walsh
- Annie Dylan as Linda
- Jack McGee as Frank
- Jaime P. Gomez as Bobby

== See also ==
- List of films about the sport of athletics
