= Shiloh (film) =

- Theatrical release poster
- Directed by: Dale Rosenbloom
- Written by: Dale Rosenbloom
- Based on: Shiloh by Phyllis Reynolds Naylor
- Produced by: Zane W. Levitt; Dale Rosenbloom; Mark Yellen
- Starring: Michael Moriarty; Blake Heron; Scott Wilson; Ann Dowd; Bonnie Bartlett; Rod Steiger
- Cinematography: Frank Byers
- Edited by: Mark S. Westmore
- Music by: Joel Goldsmith
- Production companies: Zeta Entertainment; Utopia Pictures; Good Dog Productions; Carl Borack Productions
- Distributed by: Legacy Releasing
- Release dates: November 8, 1996 (Heartland Film Festival); April 25, 1997 (United States)
- Running time: 91 minutes
- Country: United States
- Language: English

Shiloh is a 1996 American family drama film directed, written, and co-produced by Dale Rosenbloom (in his sole directorial effort), and based on Phyllis Reynolds Naylor's novel of the same name. It follows a family son defending a mistreated beagle from his abusive owner. The film premiered at the Heartland Film Festival in 1996, but its general release came on April 25, 1997. There are two sequels, Shiloh 2: Shiloh Season (1999) and Saving Shiloh (2006), both directed by Sandy Tung and distributed by Utopia Pictures.

== Plot ==
An abused Beagle puppy avoids his cruel owner, Judd Travers, and meets a boy named Marty Preston, who names him Shiloh. Marty's strict father, Ray, will not let Marty keep Shiloh because he is not their dog. Having personally witnessed Judd's mistreatment of Shiloh, Marty returns the dog to him without a choice. After Shiloh is mistreated again, the dog returns to Marty. Knowing his father will make him return Shiloh, Marty hides him in a shed behind the house.

His secret is soon revealed when his mother, Louise, comes up the hill and sees Marty and Shiloh bonding. Ray soon finds out what Marty is doing when a violent German Shepherd belonging to the Baker family savages Shiloh, and Marty calls Ray for help. They take Shiloh to their friend Dr. Wallace to be attended to. Marty urges his father to keep Shiloh, pleading about how Judd abuses the dog. Ray initially agrees to keep Shiloh until he recovers and tries not to become attached to Shiloh. That night, when Ray thinks Marty is asleep he gives the dog a treat, and soon his heart softens.

Eventually, Marty goes to see Judd and threatens to report him for trying to shoot a deer out of hunting season, unless he agrees to sell Shiloh. Judd agrees but, instead of money, he wants twenty hours of Marty's work on his house as payment. After Marty has completed the work, Judd refuses to follow through, saying that there were no witnesses to the deal. Judd plans to retrieve Shiloh, despite Marty's warning. Marty keeps Shiloh for the next few days until Judd returns to take the dog. Marty and Ray fight with Judd for Shiloh.

Marty and Ray fail to stop Judd from driving away in his truck with Shiloh. However, the reconsidered Judd decides to release Shiloh, and the dog reconciles with Marty and Ray.

== Cast ==
- Michael Moriarty as Raymond "Ray" Preston
- Blake Heron as Martin "Marty" Preston
- Scott Wilson as Judd Travers
- Ann Dowd as Louise "Lou" Preston
- J. Madison Wright as Samantha "Sam" Wallace
- Shira Roth as Dara Lynn Preston
- Tori Wright as Rebecca "Becky" Preston
- Bonnie Bartlett as Mrs. Wallace
- Rod Steiger as Dr. Wallace
- Frannie as Shiloh

== Reception ==
Roger Ebert gave the film 3.5 stars out of 4, calling it "a remarkably mature and complex story about a boy who loves a dog and cannot bear to see it mistreated" and that "it deals with real moral issues: with property, responsibility, and honesty, and with whether there is a higher good that justifies breaking ordinary rules". On Rotten Tomatoes it has a rating of 73% based on reviews from 11 critics.
