= Hands on a Hardbody =

Hands on a Hardbody may refer to:

- Hands on a Hard Body: The Documentary, 1997 film
  - Hands on a Hardbody (musical), 2012 stage musical adaptation of the film
