= Blake Heron =

American actor (1982–2017)

- Born: January 11, 1982; Rockville Centre, New York, U.S.
- Died: September 8, 2017 (aged 35); La Crescenta-Montrose, California, U.S.
- Occupation: Actor
- Years active: 1995–2017
- Awards: Young Artist Award for Best Leading Young Actor in a Feature Film (1998)

Blake Christopher Heron (January 11, 1982 – September 8, 2017) was an American actor. He was best known for his starring role as Marty Preston in the 1996 film Shiloh. He died of an accidental drug overdose, aged 35.

== Early life ==
Heron was born in Rockville Centre, New York on January 11, 1982. After his parents divorced, he moved with his mother to Atlanta, then to New York City, and finally to Burbank, California, where he began his acting career.

== Career ==
In 1994 he played a drummer boy in the film Andersonville. He then made the Disney film Tom and Huck (1995) and the television series Reality Check. When the series did not last, Heron starred in several television movies, including Trilogy of Terror II (1996). Nick Freno: Licensed Teacher (1996) was his biggest role at the age of 14. He played the flirtatious jock, Jordan. In 1997, he played the lead role of Marty Preston in the Warner Bros. film Shiloh.

After graduating from high school in 2000, Heron avoided child roles and took on more serious adult roles. In the HBO movie Cheaters (2000) he played a conspiring dark teen, then had the same type of role in Blast (2000). After appearing in television hits such as Boston Public (2000), Family Law (1999) and The Guardian, he took on the role of Specialist Galen Bungum in We Were Soldiers (2002). He also appeared in Dandelion (2004). He recently appeared in the movie A Thousand Junkies, which premiered at the 2017 Tribeca Film Festival, and was Heron's final film role before his death.

== Death ==
Heron battled drug addiction since the age of 12 and completed drug rehab for heroin addiction.

On September 8, 2017, Heron was found unresponsive by his girlfriend in his Los Angeles home. He was pronounced dead, aged 35, after paramedics were unable to revive him. A friend reported that in his last days, Heron had the flu, for which authorities found several prescription drugs; they found no illegal drugs.

Five months after his death, Heron's death was ruled an accidental drug overdose due to the "effects of multiple drugs," notably the opioid fentanyl.

== Filmography ==
Year	Title	Role	Notes
1995	Tom and Huck	Ben Rodgers	
1996	Shiloh	Marty Preston	
1996	Cybill	Dylan	
2000	Blast	Jonesy	
2000	Wind River	Nick Wilson - Yagaichi	
2000	ER	Trent Larson	
2000	Cheaters	Matt Kur	
2002	We Were Soldiers	Sp4 Galen Bungum	
2003	11:14	Aaron	
2004	Dandelion	Eddie	
2015	No Solicitors	Rapist	
2015	Benjamin Troubles	Mugger	
2017	A Thousand Junkies	Blake	
2018	Dirt	Robbie	
2019	Slayer: The Repentless Killogy	Gunman Henchman	(final film role)
