= Eight Days a Week (film) =

1999 American comedy film by Michael Davis

- Video release poster
- Directed by: Michael Davis
- Written by: Michael Davis
- Produced by: Martin Cutler; Michael Davis; Gary Preisler
- Starring: Joshua Schaefer; Keri Russell; R. D. Robb; Mark Taylor; Johnny Green; Catherine Hicks
- Cinematography: James Lawrence Spencer
- Edited by: David Carkhuff
- Music by: Kevin Bassinson
- Production company: Underdog Productions
- Distributed by: Legacy Releasing
- Release date: February 26, 1999
- Running time: 92 minutes
- Country: United States
- Language: English

Eight Days a Week is a 1997 comedy film written and directed by Michael Davis. The title is taken from the Beatles song of the same name. The film features Dishwalla's 1996 hit "Counting Blue Cars".

== Plot ==
Peter (Joshua Schaefer) is infatuated with his childhood friend and next-door neighbor Erica (Keri Russell). Based on advice from his grandfather, Peter decides to camp on Erica's lawn until she realizes that she loves him. During his summer-long wait, he frequently comments on their neighborhood.

== Cast ==
- Joshua Schaefer as Peter
- Keri Russell as Erica
- R.D. Robb as Matt, Peter's best friend
- Mark Taylor as Peter's father
- Marcia Shapiro as Marge, Peter's mother
- Johnny Green as Nick, Erica's boyfriend
- Buck Kartalian as Nonno, Marge's dad
- Catherine Hicks as Ms. Lewis
- Patrick O'Brien as Erica's father
- Darleen Carr as Erica's mother
- Biff Manard as the Sad Man
- Annie O'Donnell as Sad Man's Wife
- Ernestine Mercer as Crazy Lady
- Bill Hollis as Mr. Hatfield
- Jean Pflieger as Ms. McCoy
- Hunter Phoenix as Angela Hamilton

== Reception ==
On Rotten Tomatoes the film has an approval rating of 20% based on reviews from 10 critics.

Emanuel Levy wrote: "A highlight of 1997 Slamdance Film Fest, this raunchy romantic comedy has a nice premise—a Romeo who won't take no as an answer--but no narrative or plot to speak of, though two leads are charming and Keri Russell shows potential to become a star." He gave it a grade C.

David Cornelius of DVDTalk.com called it "Clumsy but delightful" and gave it 3 out of 5.
