= Sandy Tung =

American film director

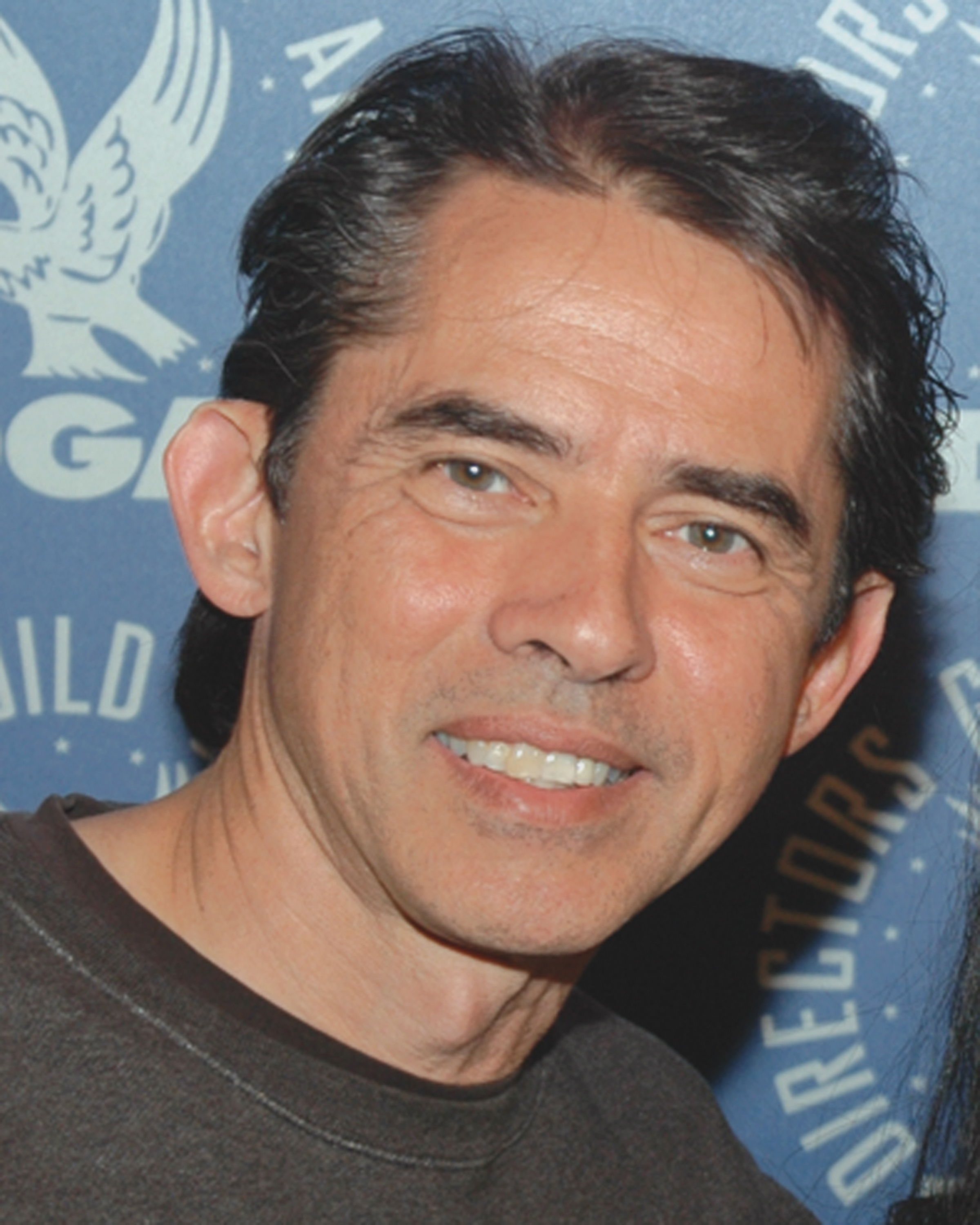
Sandy Tung

Sandy Tung is an American independent film director, writer and producer. He was born on Staten Island, New York. He received an MFA in filmmaking from New York University. His feature films include A Marriage (1983), Across the Tracks (1991), Confessions of a Sexist Pig (1998), Shiloh 2: Shiloh Season (1999), Soccer Dog: European Cup (2004), Saving Shiloh (2006), and Alice Upside Down (2008). Tung was also the first director of Asian American descent to receive the prestigious Directors Guild of America Award for his direction of the CBS Schoolbreak Special, "The Day the Senior Class Got Married" (1985).
