= Shiloh 2: Shiloh Season =

- Video release poster
- Directed by: Sandy Tung
- Based on: Shiloh by Phyllis Reynolds Naylor
- Produced by: Carl Borack; Dale Rosenbloom
- Starring: Michael Moriarty; Scott Wilson; Zachary Browne; Ann Dowd; Caitlin Wachs; Rachel David; Rod Steiger; Bonnie Bartlett
- Cinematography: Troy Smith
- Edited by: Tom Seid
- Music by: David De Palo; Joel Goldsmith
- Production company: Utopia Pictures
- Distributed by: Legacy Releasing
- Release date: July 2, 1999
- Running time: 96 minutes
- Country: United States
- Language: English
- Box office: $58,946

Shiloh Season is a 1999 direct-to-video film directed by Sandy Tung and starring Zachary Browne. It serves as a film sequel to the 1997 film Shiloh, which was adapted from the book by the same name by Phyllis Reynolds Naylor.

== Plot ==
Judd is upset that Shiloh (his former hunting dog) now belongs to Marty. In the first film, Marty did hard labor to get Shiloh from Judd. Judd starts drinking more heavily and almost runs Marty and Shiloh off the road with his truck. Marty encounters Judd several times, including one key moment when Marty and his friend David Howard spy on Judd from behind a tree in front of his house.

Later, Judd crashes his truck into the creek while driving drunk. Shiloh's loud barking gets Marty's attention, and he finds Judd. Judd is taken to the hospital and returns home sometime later. Marty wants to be nice with Judd and makes donations of bread and meat. Marty then starts writing Judd letters, telling him stories about Shiloh. Judd reads them and starts to bond with Marty.

In the end, Marty decides he wants to take Shiloh with him to visit Judd. Marty and Judd start to become friends. Judd starts to gets close with his dogs and he lets them come inside when it starts to rain.

== Cast ==
- Michael Moriarty as Raymond "Ray" Preston
- Scott Wilson as Judd Travers
- Zachary Browne as Martin "Marty" Preston
- Ann Dowd as Louise "Lou" Preston
- Caitlin Wachs as Dara Lynn Preston
- Joe Pichler as David Howard
- Rachel David as Rebecca "Becky" Preston
- Marissa Leigh as Samantha "Sam" Wallace
- Bonnie Bartlett as Mrs. Wallace
- Rod Steiger as Doc Wallace
- Frannie as Shiloh
- John Short as Mr. Howard

== Reception ==
The film holds a rating of 70% on Rotten Tomatoes, based on 20 reviews with an average score of 6.6/10.
