= Scott Wilson (actor) =

American actor (1942–2018)

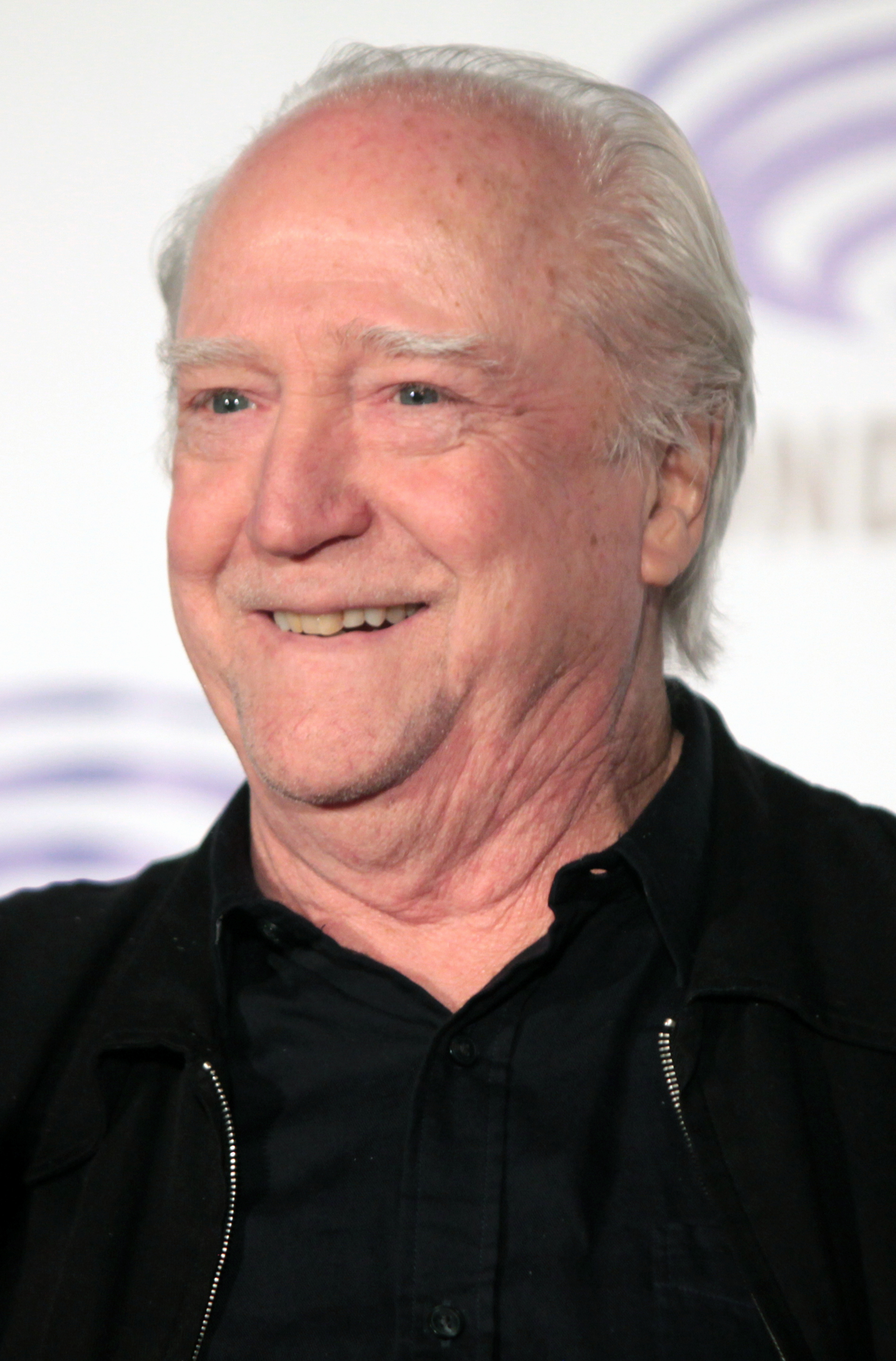
- Wilson in 2016
- Born: William Delano Wilson; March 29, 1942; Thomasville, Georgia, U.S.
- Died: October 6, 2018 (aged 76); Los Angeles, California, U.S.
- Resting place: Forest Lawn Memorial Park, Hollywood Hills, California, U.S.
- Education: Southern Polytechnic State University
- Occupation: Actor
- Years active: 1967–2018
- Spouse: Heavenly Wilson (m. 1977)

William Delano Wilson (March 29, 1942 – October 6, 2018), known professionally as Scott Wilson, was an American film and television actor.

His breakout role was as real-life murderer Richard Hickock in the critically acclaimed film In Cold Blood (1967). He subsequently appeared in films like The Grissom Gang (1971), The New Centurions (1972), The Great Gatsby (1974), The Right Stuff (1983), A Year of the Quiet Sun (1984), The Exorcist III (1990), Dead Man Walking (1995), Shiloh (1996) and its sequels, Pride (1998), The Way of the Gun (2000), Pearl Harbor (2001), The Last Samurai (2003), Junebug (2005), and The Host (2006). He received a Golden Globe nomination for Best Supporting Actor – Motion Picture for his role in William Peter Blatty's The Ninth Configuration (1980).

On television, Wilson played Hershel Greene on the AMC series The Walking Dead (2011–14; 2018). He also had a recurring role on CSI: Crime Scene Investigation as casino mogul Sam Braun, as well as a lead role on the Netflix series The OA as Abel Johnson.

== Early life and education ==
Wilson was born William Delano Wilson in the small Southern town of Thomasville, Georgia. He attended Southern Polytechnic State University, where he studied architecture and played basketball, but on a whim decided to hitchhike to Los Angeles in pursuit of an acting career. He worked several odd jobs while appearing in local theater productions.

== Career ==
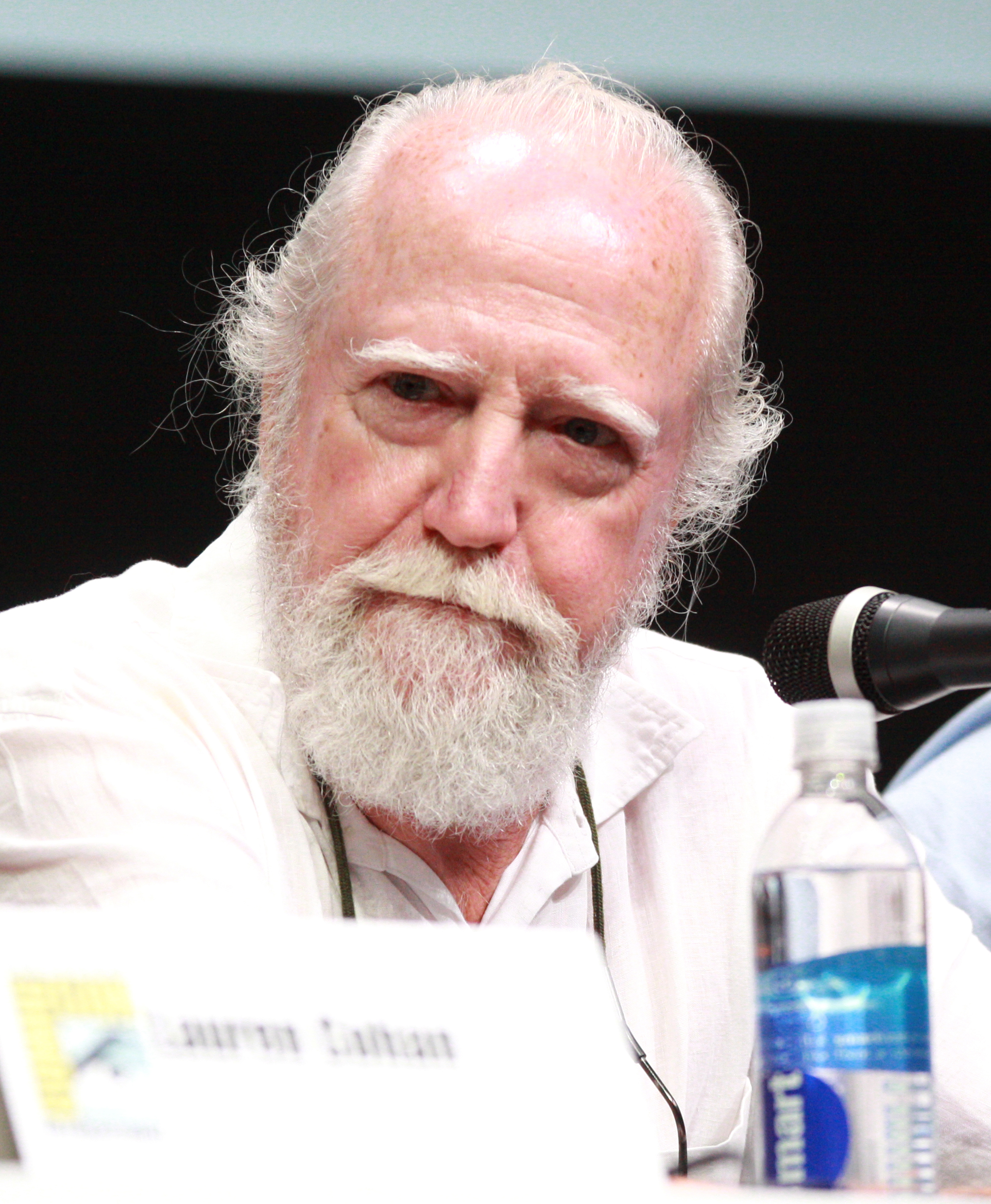
Scott Wilson at the 2013 San Diego Comic-Con, July 2013

In his first three films he portrayed characters suspected of murder. In his debut film, a 25-year-old Wilson played a murder suspect in In the Heat of the Night (1967). Director Norman Jewison spotted him a local stage production, and cast him thanks to his quintessential "everyman Southerner" appearance and mannerisms.

His follow-up role, in the same year, was in the film version of In Cold Blood, based on the book of the same name by Truman Capote. Wilson portrayed real-life murderer Richard Hickock, while Robert Blake played his partner, Perry Smith.

Director Richard Brooks cast Wilson and Blake in the starring roles specifically because they were unknown at the time. The director passed over better-known actors, including Steve McQueen and Paul Newman, for the parts. Wilson later explained Brooks' casting motivations: "Brooks hired two 'unknowns' and he wanted to keep it that way. We were treated like two killers he had somehow run across."

The film earned Wilson an appearance on the cover of Life magazine, published on May 12, 1967. Wilson was just 25 years old at the time. The cover features Truman Capote standing between Wilson and Blake on an empty highway in Kansas. The caption, Nightmare Revisited, appears with them on the cover.

In 1974 Wilson appeared as a vengeful cuckold bearing his same surname in The Great Gatsby opposite Robert Redford. He received a 1980 Golden Globe nomination for Best Supporting Actor for his performance in The Ninth Configuration by director and friend William Peter Blatty. He lost the Golden Globe to Timothy Hutton. In 1995 Wilson got attention for his role as a prison chaplain in Dead Man Walking, starring Susan Sarandon and Sean Penn, based on the book of the same name by Sister Helen Prejean.

Wilson's filmography also includes The Gypsy Moths, The Right Stuff, A Year of the Quiet Sun, Malone, The Grass Harp, Junebug, The Host, Monster, Young Guns II, Pearl Harbor, Big Stan, Judge Dredd, the Shiloh film series and Behind the Mask: The Rise of Leslie Vernon. Wilson has filmed on location in South Korea, Japan and Spain. Wilson had a recurring role in several episodes of CSI: Crime Scene Investigation as Sam Braun, father of crime-scene investigator Catherine Willows (portrayed by Marg Helgenberger). Braun was killed off in the episode "Built to Kill, Part 2". In the fall of 2011 he also made an appearance opposite Laura Dern in the HBO series, Enlightened.

Wilson was cast as veterinarian, Hershel Greene in the second season of The Walking Dead in June 2011. The role has earned him positive reviews, including a "cheer" from TV Guide, which wrote that he had contributed "subtle shades of humanity to the character of Hershel Greene." Wilson was offered the opportunity to join the show while visiting his 97-year-old mother in Georgia. He has described his mother as "a fan of the show." Wilson left the show in December 2013 after his character was killed off in the season 4 mid-season finale "Too Far Gone". However, he made two guest appearances since his character's death, and made his last onscreen appearance in the fifth episode of the ninth season of The Walking Dead.

Wilson reflected on his career in a 2011 interview with Access Atlanta's Rodney Ho: "It's been up and down. It's always been. You have dry spells. At different times, you are starting over. If you love it, you stay with it. That's what I'm doing. I've accomplished more than I would have hoped to have accomplished. I don't want to be a big movie star. I can be someone who walks the streets and not get mobbed. I want to be as fine an actor as I can be. I am still striving to be as good as I can be." Wilson was filming scenes for The Walking Dead in Senoia, Georgia, at the time the interview took place. In 2014, Wilson was cast in a recurring role as Dr. Guyot in the Amazon original series Bosch. In 2016, he appeared in the Netflix series The OA.

Wilson appeared in Sparta, Illinois where In the Heat of the Night was filmed, on March 15, 2014, to celebrate the city's 175th anniversary in reference to his debut appearance in the film.

== Personal life ==
Wilson married his Korean wife, Siok Tian Heavenly Koh, in 1977.

=== Death ===
Wilson died from leukemia at his home in Los Angeles, on October 6, 2018, at the age of 76. The premiere episode of The Walking Dead's ninth season, "A New Beginning", which aired the next day, was dedicated to Wilson's memory which is shown in the final credits of the episode.

== Filmography ==
=== Film ===
Year	Title	Role	Notes
1967	In the Heat of the Night	Harvey Oberst	
1967	In Cold Blood	Richard Hickock	
1969	Castle Keep	Cpl. Clearboy	
1969	The Gypsy Moths	Malcolm Webson	
1971	The Grissom Gang	Slim Grissom	
1972	The New Centurions	Gus	
1973	Lolly-Madonna XXX	Thrush	
1974	The Great Gatsby	George Wilson	
1976	The Passover Plot	Judah	
1979	La Ilegal	Police Officer	
1980	The Ninth Configuration	Cpt. Billy Cutshaw	
1983	The Right Stuff	Scott Crossfield	
1984	A Year of the Quiet Sun	Norman	
1984	Río Abajo (On the Line)	Mitch	
1985	The Aviator	Jerry Stiller	
1986	Blue City	Percy Kerch	
1987	Malone	Paul Barlow	
1989	Johnny Handsome	Mikey Chalmette	
1990	Young Guns II	Governor Lew Wallace	
1990	The Exorcist III	Dr. Temple	
1990	La Cruz de Iberia	Johnson	
1991	Femme Fatale	Dr. Beaumont	
1991	Pure Luck	Frank Grimes	
1993	Flesh and Bone	Elliot	
1993	Geronimo: An American Legend	Redondo	
1995	Tall Tale	Zeb	
1995	Judge Dredd	Pa Angel	Uncredited
1995	The Grass Harp	Eugene Fenwick	
1995	Dead Man Walking	Chaplain Farley	
1995	Mother	Dr. Chase	
1996	Shiloh	Judd Travers	
1997	Our God's Brother	Albert Chmielowski	
1997	G.I. Jane	Captain Salem	
1998	Puraido: Unmei no Toki	Joseph B. Keenan	
1998	Clay Pigeons	Sheriff Dan Mooney	
1999	Shiloh 2: Shiloh Season	Judd Travers	
1999	The Debtors		Unreleased until 2023
2000	South of Heaven, West of Hell	Clete Monroe	
2000	The Way of the Gun	Hale Chidduck	
2001	The Animal	Mayor	
2001	Pearl Harbor	General George Marshall	
2002	Bark!	Harold	
2002	Coastlines	Pa Mann	
2002	Don't Let Go	Hershel Ray Stevens	
2003	Monster	Horton / Last "John"	
2003	The Last Samurai	Ambassador Swanbeck	
2005	Junebug	Eugene Johnsten	
2006	Open Window	Eddie Delaney	
2006	Come Early Morning	Lowell Fowler	
2006	Saving Shiloh	Judd Travers	
2006	The Host	US Military Doctor	
2006	Behind the Mask: The Rise of Leslie Vernon	Eugene	
2006	The Sensation of Sight	Tucker	
2007	The Heartbreak Kid	Boo	
2007	Big Stan	Warden Gasque	
2009	Saving Grace B. Jones	Reverend Potter	
2009	Bottleworld	Murray	
2009	For Sale by Owner	Dr. Banks	
2010	Radio Free Albemuth	President Fremont	
2011	Dorfman	Winston Cooke Sr.	
2017	Hostiles	Cyrus Lounde	

=== Television ===
Year	Title	Role	Notes
1986	The Twilight Zone	Matthew Foreman	Episode: "Quarantine"
1988	Jesse	Sam Maloney	Television film
1988	The Tracker	John "Red Jack" Stillwell	Television film
1993	Elvis and the Colonel: The Untold Story	Vernon Presley	Television film
1995	Soul Survivors	Bradley Facemeyer	Television film
1999	The Jack Bull	Governor	Television film
2000	The X-Files	Rev. Orison	Episode: "Orison"
2001–06	CSI: Crime Scene Investigation	Sam Braun	9 episodes
2003	Karen Sisco	Homer	Episode: "Dumb Bunnies"
2005	Law & Order	Ben Chaney	Episode: "Sport of Kings"
2011	Justified	Frank Reasoner	Episode: "Blaze of Glory"
2011	Enlightened	Marv	Episode: "Someone Else's Life"
2011–14; 2018 (Note: In the Season 9 episode “What Comes After,” Wilson reprised his role as Hershel Greene in a dream sequence experienced by Rick Grimes.)	The Walking Dead	Hershel Greene	33 episodes
2011	Five	Old Bill	Television film
2014–15	Bosch	Paul Guyot	3 episodes
2016	Damien	John Lyons	5 episodes
2016–19	The OA	Abel Johnson	7 episodes
2017	Robot Chicken	Hershel Greene (voice)	Episode: "The Robot Chicken Walking Dead Special: Look Who's Walking"
2026	The Walking Dead: Dead City	Hershel Greene	1 episode (Archive Footage)

== Awards and nominations ==
Institution	Year	Category	Work	Result
Florida Film Festival	1998	Lifetime Achievement Award	—N/a	Won
Golden Globe Awards	1981	Best Supporting Actor – Motion Picture	The Ninth Configuration	Nominated
Golden Raspberry Awards	1987	Worst Supporting Actor	Blue City	Nominated
Mystfest	1980	Best Actor	The Ninth Configuration	Won
Screen Actors Guild	2007	Ralph Morgan Award	—N/a	Won
