= Utopia Pictures & Television =

- Industry: Film production; Film distribution
- Key people: Declan O'Brien (president)

Utopia Pictures & Television is a production company and film distributor whose credits include the three movies based on the novel, Shiloh. On February 1, 2004, Variety announced that they had acquired the rights to produce three of Philip K. Dick's works: Flow My Tears, the Policeman Said, VALIS and Radio Free Albemuth. Declan O'Brien is President of the company.
