= Rod Steiger on screen and stage =

American actor (1925–2002)

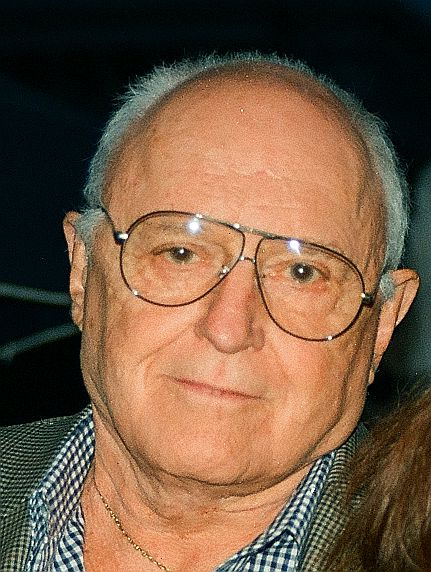
Steiger in 1995

Rod Steiger was an American actor who had an extensive career in film, television, and stage. He made his stage debut in 1946 with Civic Repertory Theatre's production of the melodrama Curse you, Jack Dalton!. He worked onstage in a production of An Enemy of the People at the Music Box Theatre. He had a small role in his film debut Teresa (1951). In 1953, he played the title role in the teleplay Marty. He had a breakout role for the crime film On the Waterfront (1954), and was nominated for the Academy Award for Best Supporting Actor. Steiger starred in the musical film Oklahoma! (1955).

Steiger played a crooked promoter in Mark Robson's boxing film noir The Harder They Fall (1956). In the British thriller Across the Bridge (1957), he played a German con-artist on the run in Mexico. He starred in Andrew L. Stone's thriller film Cry Terror! (1958). He played a real-life businessman Al Capone in Richard Wilson's 1959 biopic film of the same name. He played the lieutenant commander of the USS Satterlee set in Normandy landings for the war film The Longest Day (1962). Steiger played a highly educated blind man traveling West to found a school for the blind in California, in the S-4 / E-28 episode on the long-running Western TV series Wagon Train, "The Saul Bevins Story" (1961). For playing a survivor of the Holocaust in the drama The Pawnbroker (1964), he garnered a BAFTA Award for Best Actor in a Leading Role, and nominations for the Academy Award and Golden Globe Award in the same category. The following year, he was cast in the role of a ruthless Russian Empire politician caught up in the 1917 Russian Revolutions and following Civil War in the epic Doctor Zhivago, which was the biggest box-office success of the 1960s, and was included in AFI's 100 Years...100 Movies. He won an Academy Award, a BAFTA and a Golden Globe Award for Best Actor for Norman Jewison's mystery drama In the Heat of the Night (1967), playing a Southern small town police chief coping with an unexpected murder. He played a serial killer in the thriller film No Way to Treat a Lady (1968), and ended the decade with the box-office bomb film Three into Two Won't Go (1969).

In the 1970s, Steiger starred in foreign productions and independent films in search of more demanding roles. His roles during the period include Waterloo (1970), about the famous 1815 battle ending the Napoleonic Wars in Europe, Duck, You Sucker! (1971), about the Irish Republican Army revolutionary in Mexico during their 1910–20 revolutionary period, Last Days of Mussolini (1975), about the Fascist Italian dictator in World War II, W. C. Fields and Me (1976), Roman Empire governor Pontius Pilate in Jesus of Nazareth (1977 TV miniseries), F.I.S.T. (1978), as a 1930s labor union boss, and The Amityville Horror (1979). After suffering a heart attack in 1979 and undergoing surgery, his poor health and subsequent unfortunate psychological depression took its toll on Steiger's career, and he was forced to appear in several low-budget B movies. Although he was nominated the following year for the Genie Award for Best Performance by a Foreign Actor for his roles in the Canadian productions Klondike Fever and The Lucky Star in 1980, and won the Montréal World Film Festival Award for Best Actor the next year for Jeremy Kagan's The Chosen (1981), his subsequent roles were mainly in low-budget films. In 1989, he played authority figures in two films, including The January Man and Tennessee Waltz.

In 1990, Steiger starred in Men of Respect, an adaptation of William Shakespeare's play Macbeth. His role in the critically panned thriller film, The Specialist (1994), earned him a nomination for the infamous Golden Raspberry Award for Worst Supporting Actor. Steiger appeared in both films, Shiloh (1995) and Shiloh 2: Shiloh Season (1998). He reunited with Jewison for the biopic film The Hurricane (1999), in which he played judge H. Lee Sarokin. He starred in the drama film The Last Producer (2000) and made his final film role for Poolhall Junkies (2002).

== Film ==
Title	Year	Role	Director(s)	Notes	Ref(s)
Teresa	1951	Frank	Fred Zinnemann	Film debut	
On the Waterfront	1954	Charlie Malloy	Elia Kazan		
Oklahoma!	1955	Jud Fry	Fred Zinnemann		
The Big Knife	1955	Stanley Shriner Hoff	Robert Aldrich		
The Court-Martial of Billy Mitchell	1955	Major Allan Guillon	Otto Preminger		
The Harder They Fall	1956	Nick Benko	Mark Robson		
Jubal	1956	'Pinky' Pinkum	Delmer Daves		
Back from Eternity	1956	Vasquel	John Farrow		
The Unholy Wife	1957	Paul Hochen	John Farrow		
Run of the Arrow	1957	Private O'Meara	Samuel Fuller		
Across the Bridge	1957	Carl Schaffner	Ken Annakin		
Cry Terror!	1958	Paul Hoplin	Andrew L. Stone		
Al Capone	1959	Al Capone	Richard Wilson		
Seven Thieves	1960	Paul Mason	Henry Hathaway		
World in My Pocket	1961	Frank Morgan	Alvin Rakoff		
The Mark	1961	Dr. Edmund McNally	Guy Green		
13 West Street	1962	Sergeant Koleski	Philip Leacock		
Convicts 4	1962	Tiptoes	Millard Kaufman		
The Longest Day	1962	Destroyer Commander	Andrew Marton		
Hands Over the City	1963	Edoardo Nottola	Francesco Rosi		
The Pawnbroker	1964	Sol Nazerman	Sidney Lumet		
Time of Indifference	1964	Leo	Francesco Maselli		
The Loved One	1965	Mr. Joyboy	Tony Richardson		
A Man Named John	1965	The Intermediary	Ermanno Olmi		
Doctor Zhivago	1965	Victor Ipolitovich Komarovsky	David Lean		
In the Heat of the Night	1967	Chief of Police Bill Gillespie	Norman Jewison		
The Girl and the General	1967	The General	Pasquale Festa Campanile		
No Way to Treat a Lady	1968	Christopher Gill	Jack Smight		
The Sergeant	1968	Sergeant Albert Callan	John Flynn		
The Illustrated Man	1969	Carl	Jack Smight		
Three into Two Won't Go	1969	Steve Howard	Peter Hall		
Waterloo	1970	Napoleon Bonaparte	Sergei Bondarchuk		
Bridge from No Place	1971	Unseen Narrator	William Templeton	23-minute anti-drug documentary	
Duck, You Sucker!	1971	Juan Miranda	Sergio Leone		
Happy Birthday, Wanda June	1971	Harold Ryan	Mark Robson		
Lolly-Madonna XXX	1973	Laban Feather	Richard C. Sarafian		
The Heroes	1973	Guenther Von Lutz	Duccio Tessari		
Lucky Luciano	1973	Gene Giannini	Francesco Rosi		
Last Days of Mussolini	1975	Benito Mussolini	Carlo Lizzani		
Innocents with Dirty Hands	1975	Louis Wormser	Claude Chabrol		
Hennessy	1975	Niall Hennessy	Don Sharp		
W. C. Fields and Me	1976	W. C. Fields	Arthur Hiller		
F.I.S.T.	1978	Senator Andrew Madison	Norman Jewison		
Love and Bullets	1979	Joe Bamposa	Stuart Rosenberg		
Breakthrough	1979	General Webster	Andrew V. McLaglen		
Portrait of a Hitman	1979	Max Andreotti	Allan A. Buckhantz		
The Amityville Horror	1979	Father Delaney	Stuart Rosenberg		
Klondike Fever	1980	Soapy Smith	Peter Carter		
The Lucky Star	1980	Colonel Gluck	Max Fischer		
Lion of the Desert	1980	Benito Mussolini	Moustapha Akkad		
Wolf Lake	1980	Charlie	Burt Kennedy		
Cattle Annie and Little Britches	1981	Bill Tilghman	Lamont Johnson		
The Chosen	1981	Reb Saunders	Jeremy Kagan		
The Magic Mountain	1982	Mynheer Peeperkorn	Hans W. Geißendörfer		
The Naked Face	1984	Lieutenant McGreary	Bryan Forbes		
The Kindred	1987	Phillip Lloyd	Stephen Carpenter; Jeffrey Obrow		
Catch the Heat	1987	Jason Hannibal	Joel Silberg		
American Gothic	1988	Pa	John Hough		
The January Man	1989	Mayor Eamon Flynn	Pat O'Connor		
That Summer of White Roses	1989	Martin	Rajko Grlić		
Tennessee Waltz	1989	Judge Prescott	Nicolas Gessner		
Men of Respect	1990	Charlie D'Amico	William C. Reilly		
The Ballad of the Sad Cafe	1991	Reverend Willin	Simon Callow		
Guilty as Charged	1991	Kallin	Sam Irvin		
The Player	1992	Himself	Robert Altman		
Kölcsönkapott idö	1993	Sepak	István Poór		
The Neighbor	1993	Dr. Myron Hatch	Rodney Gibbons		
The Last Tattoo	1994	General Frank Zane	John Reid		
The Specialist	1994	Joe Leon	Luis Llosa		
Seven Sundays	1994	Benjamin	Jean-Charles Tacchella		
Captain Nuke and the Bomber Boys	1995	The President	Charles Gale		
Livers Ain't Cheap	1996	Victor	James Merendino		
Carpool	1996	Mr. Hammerman	Arthur Hiller		
Shiloh	1996	Doc Wallace	Chip Rosenbloom		
Mars Attacks!	1996	General Decker	Tim Burton		
Truth or Consequences, N.M.	1997	Tony Vago	Kiefer Sutherland		
Incognito	1997	Milton A. Donovan	John Badham		
The Kid	1997	Harry Sloan	John Hamilton		
Animals	1998	Fontina	Michael Di Jiacomo		
Legacy	1998	Sadler	T.J. Scott		
The Snatching of Bookie Bob	1998	Bob 'Bookie Bob'	John Sharian	Short film	
Modern Vampires	1999	Abraham Van Helsing	Richard Elfman		
Shiloh 2: Shiloh Season	1999	Doc Wallace	Sandy Tung		
Crazy in Alabama	1999	Judge Louis Mead	Antonio Banderas		
The Hurricane	1999	Judge Sarokin	Norman Jewison		
End of Days	1999	Father Kovak	Peter Hyams		
Cypress Edge	2000	Woodrow McCammon	Serge Rodnunsky		
Body and Soul	2000	Johnny Ticotin	Sam Henry Kass		
The Last Producer	2000	Sheri Ganse	Burt Reynolds		
Lightmaker	2000	King Osso	Dieter Meier		
The Flying Dutchman	2001	Ben	Robin P. Murray		
A Month of Sundays	2001	Charley McCabe	Stewart Raffill		
The Hollywood Sign	2001	Floyd Benson	Sönke Wortmann		
Poolhall Junkies	2002	Nick	Mars Callahan		

== Television ==
Title	Year	Role	Notes	Ref(s)
"Telas, the King"	1950	Guest appearance	Actors Studio anthology series episode	
"Taste of Ashes"	1950	Guest appearance	Danger anthology series episode	
"Cafe Ami"	1951	Victor Honegger	Lux Video Theatre anthology series episode	
"Ordeal in Space"	1951	Commander William Coles	Out There anthology series episode	
"No Medals on Pop"	1951	Guest appearance	The Philco Television Playhouse anthology series episode	
"The Window"	1952	Henry	Tales of Tomorrow anthology series episode	
"The Inn"	1952	Guest appearance	Kraft Television Theatre anthology series episode	
"Alibi Me"	1952	Leo Whaley	Suspense anthology series episode	
"Raymond Schindler, Case One"	1952	Guest appearance	Goodyear Theatre anthology series episode	
"The Evil Within"	1953	Peter	Tales of Tomorrow anthology series episode	
"My Brother's Keeper"	1953	Radar Sergeant	Kraft Television Theatre anthology series episode	
"Dream House"	1953	Guest appearance	Kraft Television Theatre anthology series episode	
"Windy"	1953	Guest appearance	Danger anthology series episode	
"Cafe Society"	1953	First man	The Gulf Playhouse anthology series episode	
"The Dutch Schultz Story"	1953	Dutch Schultz	Suspense anthology series episode	
"Marty"	1953	Marty	The Philco Television Playhouse anthology series episode	
"The Quiet Village"	1953	Guest appearance	Medallion Theatre anthology series episode	
"Other People's Houses"	1953	Guest appearance	Goodyear Theatre anthology series episode	
"The Man Most Likely"	1954	Guest appearance	Kraft Television Theatre anthology series episode	
"The Murderer Who Wasn't"	1954	Willie Schmidt	Philip Morris Playhouse anthology series episode	
"Smoke Screen"	1954	Guest appearance	The Philco Television Playhouse anthology series episode	
"In the Deep of the Night"	1954	Guest appearance	Justice anthology series episode	
"Yellow Jack"	1955	Busch	Producers' Showcase anthology series episode	
A Town Has Turned to Dust	1958	Harvey Denton	Playhouse 90, Season 2, Episode 38	
Jesus of Nazareth	1977	Pontius Pilate	Miniseries	
Cook & Peary: The Race to the Pole	1983	Robert E. Peary	Television film	
The Glory Boys	1984	Professor David Sokarev	Miniseries	
Hollywood Wives	1985	Oliver Easterne	Miniseries	
Sword of Gideon	1986	Mordechai Samuels	Television film	
Desperado: Avalanche at Devil's Ridge	1988	Silas Slaten	Television film	
Passion and Paradise	1989	Sir Harry Oakes	Television film	
In the Line of Duty: Manhunt in the Dakotas	1991	Gordon Kahl	Television film	
Sinatra	1992	Sam Giancana	Biography and drama miniseries	
The Critic	1994	Himself (voice)	Episode: "L.A. Jay"	
Tom Clancy's Op Center	1995	Rudi Kushnerov (Boroda)	Miniseries	
Choices of the Heart: The Margaret Sanger Story	1995	Anthony Comstock	Television film	
In Pursuit of Honor	1995	Col. Owen Stuart	Television film	
Out There	1995	Col. Buck Gunner	Television film	
"Strange Bedfellows"	1995	Vincenzo Fortelli	Columbo series episode (May 8)	
Redemption	1996	Oskar Rothman / Carl Wolfe	The Commish series episode (January 11)	
Dalva	1996	John Wesley Northridge II	Television film	
Little Surprises	1996	Joe	Short film	
The Simpsons	1998	Captain Tenille	Voice; Episode: "Simpson Tide"	
Legacy	1998	Sadler	Television film	
The Flying Dutchman	2000	Ben	Television film	
The Last Producer	2000	Sheri Ganse	Television film	
Dinner for Five	2002	Guest appearance as himself	Series episode (April 29) final television appearance	

== Stage ==
Production	Year	Theater	Role	Ref.
Curse You, Jack Dalton!	1946	Civic Repertory Theatre of Newark	Unknown	
An Enemy of the People	1950	Music Box Theatre	Townperson	
Night Music	1951	ANTA Playhouse	A. L. Rosenberger	
Seagulls Over Sorrento	1952	John Golden Theatre	Telegraphist Sparks	
Rashomon	1959	Broadhurst Theatre	Bandit	
Moby Dick—Rehearsed	1962	Ethel Barrymore Theatre	Actor-Manager later Father Mapple and Captain Ahab	

== Bibliography ==
- Andreychuk, Ed (2000). Burt Lancaster: A Filmography and Biography. McFarland. ISBN 978-0-7864-0436-0.
- Ball, Philip (2006). Critical Mass: How One Thing Leads to Another. Farrar, Straus and Giroux. ISBN 978-1-4668-0683-2.
- Bianculli, David (1992). Teleliteracy: Taking Television Seriously. Syracuse University Press. ISBN 978-0-8156-0653-6.
- Black, Gregory D. (1998). The Catholic Crusade Against the Movies, 1940–1975. Cambridge University Press. ISBN 978-0-521-62905-8.
- Carter, Tim (2008). Oklahoma!: The Making of an American Musical. Yale University Press. ISBN 978-0-300-13487-2.
- Erskine, Thomas L.; Welsh, James M. (2000). Video Versions: Film Adaptations of Plays on Video: Film Adaptations of Plays on Video. ABC-CLIO. ISBN 978-0-313-03203-5.
- Goble, Alan (1999). The Complete Index to Literary Sources in Film. Walter de Gruyter. ISBN 978-3-11-095194-3.
- Grant, Edmond (1998). The Motion Picture Guide, 1998 Annual: The Films of 1997. CineBooks. ISBN 978-0-933997-41-7.
- Hasselhoff, David; Thompson, Peter (2007). Don't Hassel the Hoff: The Autobiography. St. Martin's Press. p. 197. ISBN 978-1-4299-0106-2.
- Hoffmann, Henryk (2000). "A" Western Filmmakers: A Biographical Dictionary of Writers, Directors, Cinematographers, Composers, Actors and Actresses. McFarland. ISBN 978-0-7864-0696-8.
- Hughes, Howard (2011). Cinema Italiano: The Complete Guide from Classics to Cult. I.B.Tauris. ISBN 978-0-85773-044-2.
- Hurt, James (1974). Focus on film and theatre. Prentice-Hall. ISBN 978-0-13-314666-0.
- Hutchinson, Tom (1998). Rod Steiger: Memoirs of a Friendship. V. Gollancz. ISBN 978-0-575-05903-0.
- Jackson, Russell (2007). The Cambridge Companion to Shakespeare on Film. Cambridge University Press. ISBN 978-1-107-49530-2.
- Keaney, Michael F. (2003). Film Noir Guide: 745 Films of the Classic Era, 1940–1959. McFarland. ISBN 978-0-7864-9155-1.
- Klinowski, Jacek; Garbicz, Adam (2012). Feature Cinema in the 20th Century: Volume Two: 1951–1963: a Comprehensive Guide. Planet RGB Limited. ISBN 978-1-62407-565-0.
- Maltin, Leonard (2014). Leonard Maltin's 2015 Movie Guide. Penguin Publishing Group. ISBN 978-0-698-18361-2.
- Milne, Jeff (2009). Six Degrees of Kevin Bacon: The Complete Guide to the Movie Trivia Game. Jeff Milne. ISBN 978-0-615-28521-4.
- Mills, Brian (2010). 101 Forgotten Films. Oldcastle Books. ISBN 978-1-84243-390-4.
- Müller, Jürgen (2004). Movies of the 60s. Taschen. ISBN 978-3-8228-2799-4.
- Niemi, Robert (2006). History in the Media: Film and Television. ABC-CLIO. ISBN 978-1-57607-952-2.
- Piper, Jim (2012). Spiritual Films: The Secular Approach. Trafford Publishing. ISBN 978-1-4669-3025-4.
- Rausch, Andy (2007). Obsessed With...Hollywood: Test Your Knowledge of the Silver Screen. Chronicle Books. ISBN 978-1-932855-72-2.
- Roberts, Jerry (2009). Encyclopedia of Television Film Directors. Scarecrow Press. ISBN 978-0-8108-6378-1.
- Santas, Constantine (2012). The Epic Films of David Lean. Scarecrow Press. ISBN 978-0-8108-8210-2.
- Shipman, David (1980). The Great Movie Stars: The International Years. Angus and Robertson. ISBN 978-0-207-95858-8.
- Simpson, Paul (2010). The Rough Guide to Cult Movies. Rough Guides Limited. ISBN 978-1-4053-8538-1.
- Simpson, Paul (2011). Movie Lists: 397 Ways to Pick a DVD. Profile Books. ISBN 978-1-84668-872-0.
- Thompson, John Herd; Randall, Stephen J. (2010). Canada and the United States: Ambivalent Allies. University of Georgia Press. ISBN 978-0-8203-3725-8.
- Tims, Hilton (2013). The Last Romantic: A life of Eric Maria Remarque. Little, Brown Book Group. ISBN 978-1-4721-1335-1.
- Zimmerman, Steve (2009). Food in the Movies (2nd ed.). McFarland. ISBN 978-0-7864-5569-0.
