= Rod Steiger =

American actor (1925–2002)

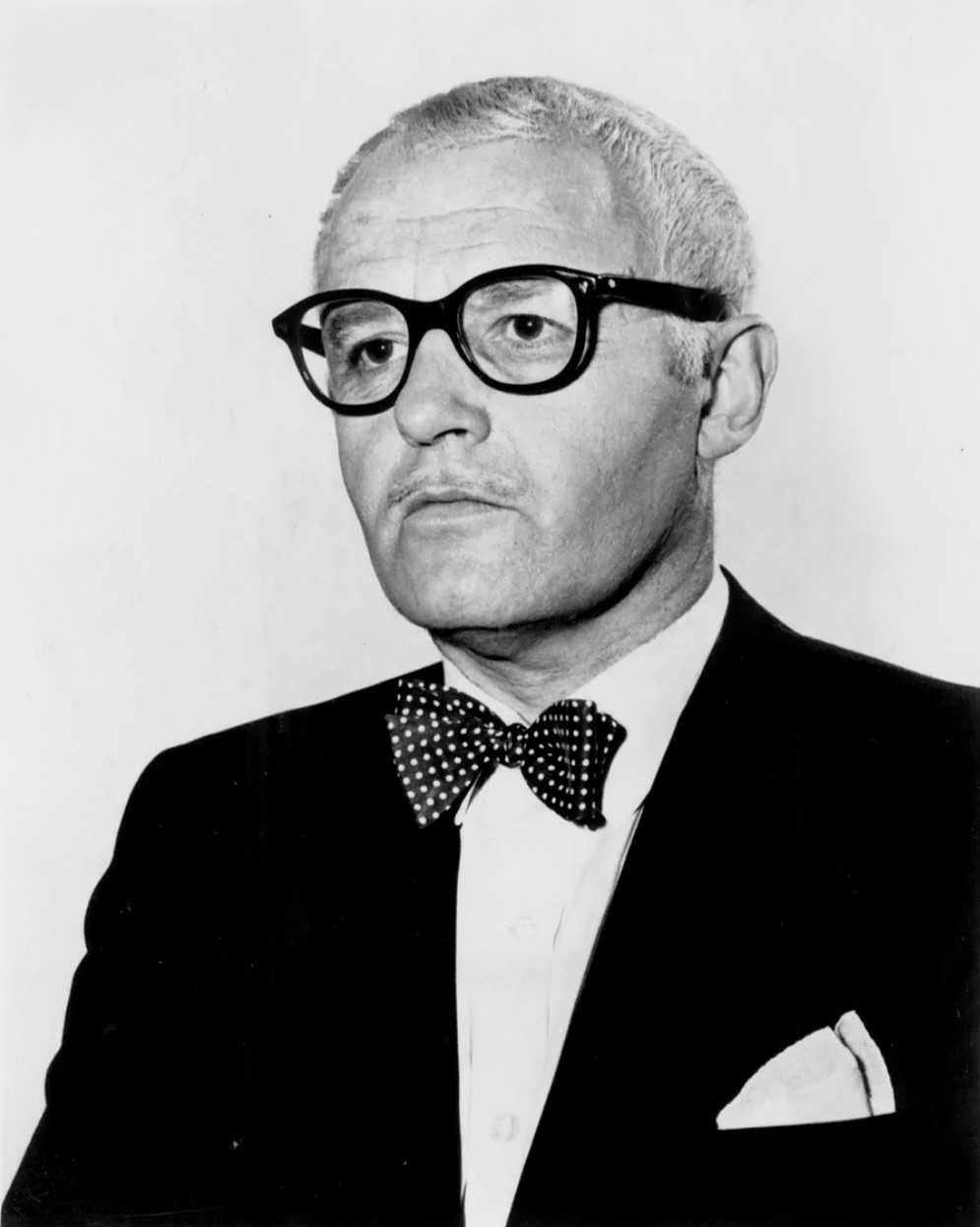
- Steiger in 1964
- Born: April 14, 1925; Westhampton, New York, U.S.
- Died: July 9, 2002 (aged 77); Los Angeles, California, U.S.
- Education: The New School for Social Research; Actors Studio
- Occupation: Actor
- Years active: 1946–2002
- Works: Full list
- Children: 2; including Anna
- Awards: Full list

Rodney Stephen Steiger (/ˈstaɪɡər/ STY-gər; April 14, 1925 – July 9, 2002) was an American actor, noted for his portrayal of offbeat, often volatile and crazed characters. Ranked as "one of Hollywood's most charismatic and dynamic stars", he is closely associated with the art of method acting, embodying the characters he played, which at times led to clashes with directors and co-stars. In films, he starred as Marlon Brando's mobster brother, Charley, in On the Waterfront (1954); the title character, Sol Nazerman, in The Pawnbroker (1964), which won him the Silver Bear for Best Actor; and as police chief Bill Gillespie, opposite Sidney Poitier, in the film In the Heat of the Night (1967), which won him the Academy Award for Best Actor.

Steiger was born in Westhampton, New York, the son of a vaudevillian. He had a difficult childhood, running away from home to escape an alcoholic mother at the age of 16. After serving in the South Pacific during World War II, he began his acting career with television roles in 1947, and went on to garner critical acclaim for his portrayal of the main character in the teleplay "Marty" (1953). He made his stage debut in 1946, in a production of Curse You, Jack Dalton! at the Civic Repertory Theatre of Newark, and subsequently appeared in productions such as An Enemy of the People (1950), Clifford Odets's Night Music (1951), Seagulls Over Sorrento (1952), and Rashomon (1959).

Steiger made his film debut in Fred Zinnemann's Teresa in 1951, and subsequently appeared in films such as The Big Knife (1955), Oklahoma! (1955), Jubal (1956), Across the Bridge (1957), and Al Capone (1959). After his performance in The Pawnbroker in 1964, in which he played an embittered Jewish Holocaust survivor working as a pawnbroker in New York City, he portrayed an opportunistic Russian politician in David Lean's Doctor Zhivago (1965). In the Heat of the Night (1967) won five Academy Awards, including Best Picture and Best Actor for Steiger, who was lauded for his performance as a Mississippi police chief who learns to respect an African-American officer (Poitier) as they search for a killer. The following year, he played a serial killer of many guises in No Way to Treat a Lady.

During the 1970s, Steiger increasingly turned to European productions in his search for more demanding roles. He portrayed Napoleon Bonaparte in Waterloo (1970), a Mexican bandit in Sergio Leone's Duck, You Sucker! (1971), Benito Mussolini in Last Days of Mussolini (1975), and ended the decade playing a disturbed priest in The Amityville Horror (1979). By the 1980s, heart problems and depression took their toll on Steiger's career, and he found it difficult to find employment, agreeing to appear in low-budget B movies. One of his final roles was as judge H. Lee Sarokin in the prison drama The Hurricane (1999), which reunited him with In the Heat of the Night director Norman Jewison. Steiger was married five times, and had a daughter, opera singer Anna Steiger, and a son, Michael Steiger. He died in 2002, aged 77, in Los Angeles.

== Early life and acting background ==
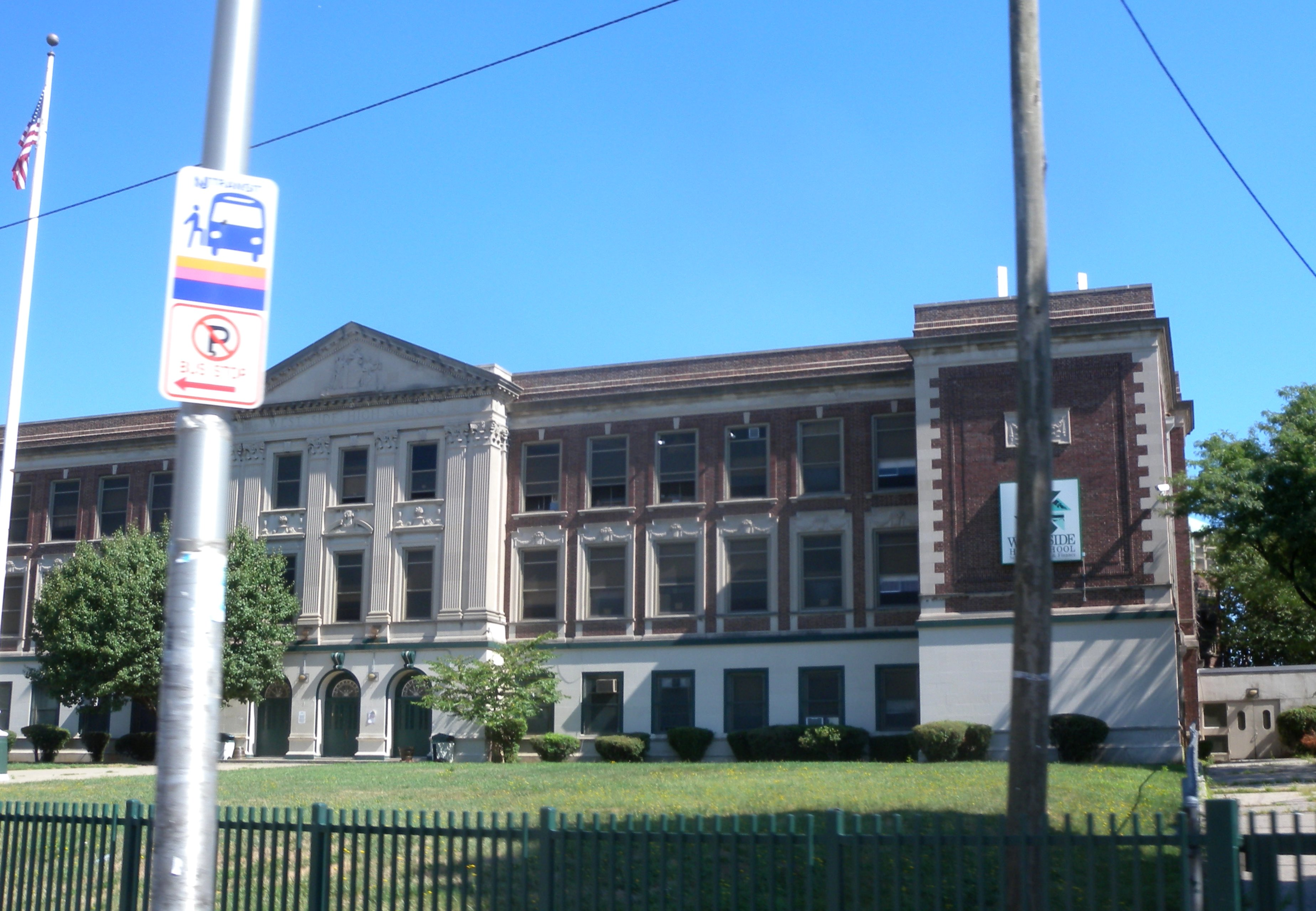
Steiger attended West Side High School in Newark, New Jersey, where he showed an early interest in acting.

Steiger was born on April 14, 1925, in Westhampton, New York, the only child of Lorraine (née Driver) and Frederick Steiger, of French, Scottish, and German descent. Rod was raised as a Lutheran. He never knew his father, a vaudevillian who had been part of a travelling song-and-dance team with Steiger's mother, but was told that he was a handsome Latino-looking man, who was a talented musician and dancer. Biographer Tom Hutchinson describes him as a "shadowy, fugitive figure", one who "haunted" Rod throughout his life and was an "invisible presence and unseen influence".

Hutchinson described Steiger's mother as "plump, energetic and small, with long auburn hair". She had a good singing voice and nearly became a Hollywood actress, but after a leg surgery permanently impaired her walking ability, she gave up acting and turned to alcohol. As a result, she quit show business and moved away from Westhampton to raise her son. They moved through several towns in New Jersey, including Irvington and Bloomfield, before settling in Newark. Her alcoholism caused Steiger much embarrassment, and the family was frequently mocked by other children and their parents within the community. At the age of five he was sexually abused by a pedophile who lured him in with a butterfly collection. Steiger said of his troubled family background: "If you had the choice of having the childhood you experienced, with your alcoholic mother and being the famous actor you are today, or having a loving, secure childhood and not being famous, which would you take? A loving, secure childhood in a New York minute". During the last 11 years of her life, Steiger's mother stayed sober and regularly attended Alcoholics Anonymous meetings. Steiger recalled: "I was so proud of her. She turned herself around. She came alive again".

During his childhood, and owing to his considerable strength and bulk, Steiger became known as "The Rock". Despite being mocked over his mother's alcoholism, he was a popular figure at school and an able softball player. He displayed an interest in writing poetry and acting during his adolescent years, and appeared in several school plays while at West Side High School in Newark. Tired of fighting with his mother, he ran away from home at age sixteen to join the United States Navy during World War II.

I realised that they had killed their first human beings. Everything in their life, religion, society, parents had conditioned them not to kill. They were shocked that they had killed. To see this at first hand was shocking, but it was eventually useful for me as an actor even though it was a very difficult experience. That look in the eye was unforgettable.

— Steiger recalling his encounters with Marines who fought on Guadalcanal

He enlisted on May 11, 1942, and received his training at the US Naval Training Station in Newport, Rhode Island. He joined the newly commissioned USS Taussig (DD-746) on May 20, 1944. While serving as a torpedoman on destroyers, he saw action in the South Pacific, including the Battle of Iwo Jima. Steiger later commented: "I loved the Navy. I was stupid enough to think I was being heroic." His experiences during the war haunted him for the rest of his life, particularly the loss of Americans during the Battle of Iwo Jima, as well as the sinking of vessels by the Taussig which were known to have women and children aboard. On December 17, 1944, off the coast of Luzon in the Philippines, Steiger and the Taussig encountered Typhoon Cobra, which became known as Halsey's Typhoon, with winds reaching one hundred knots (115 mph) and 80 foot (24 m) waves. As a result, three U.S. destroyers were lost, but the Taussig survived, with Steiger tying a rope to himself on deck and flattening himself as waves engulfed the ship.

After the war, the G.I. Bill paid for his rent at a room on West 81st Street in New York City, an income of just over $100 a month, and four years of schooling. He initially found a job oiling machines and washing floors. He decided to attend a drama class, primarily because of its membership of attractive young women. Known as the Civil Service Little Theater group, it was conducted by the Office of Dependents and Beneficiaries, where he was employed at the time. This led him to start a two-year course at the New School for Social Research, run by German émigré Erwin Piscator. During one audition, Steiger was cast after barely uttering a few words, the director exclaiming he had a "fresh, wonderful quality". Another talented pupil at the time was Walter Matthau, who dubbed the institution "The Neurotic School for Sexual Research". Steiger was surprised to discover his own talent as an actor, and he was encouraged to pursue further studies at the Dramatic Workshop. One of the main reasons he wanted to be an actor was to regain public respect for his family name, which had so humiliated him during childhood. Another important factor was his belief that he did not "have the temperament for a regular job", and would have ended up a miserable, violent alcoholic. His only role model as an actor was Paul Muni, who he thought was "the greatest", although he also had a deep respect for French actor Harry Baur and, according to biographer Hutchinson, he admired Charlie Chaplin "to the point of adoration".

== Career ==
=== Early career and breakthrough (1946–1956) ===
Steiger made his stage debut in a production of Curse You, Jack Dalton! (1946) at the Civic Repertory Theatre of Newark. Subsequent to this, he received an invitation from one of his teachers, Daniel Mann, to attend the Actors Studio, established by Elia Kazan, Robert Lewis, and Cheryl Crawford in October 1947. It was here, along with Marlon Brando, Karl Malden, and Eli Wallach, that he studied method acting, which became deeply engrained in him. Lacking matinée idol looks, much like Malden and Wallach, he began pursuing a career as a character actor rather than as a leading man. Steiger's stage work continued in 1950, with a minor role as a townperson in a stage production of An Enemy of the People at the Music Box Theatre. His first major role on Broadway came in Clifford Odets's production of Night Music (1951), where he played A. L. Rosenberger. The play was held at the ANTA Playhouse. The following year, he played a telegraphist in the play Seagulls Over Sorrento, performed at the John Golden Theatre beginning on September 11, 1952.

Steiger's early roles, although minor, were numerous, especially in television series during the early 1950s, when he appeared in more than 250 live television productions over a five-year period. He was spotted by Fred Coe, NBC's manager of program development, who increasingly gave him bigger parts. Steiger considered television to be what repertory theatre had been for an earlier generation, and saw it as a place where he could test his talent with a plethora of different roles. Soon afterward he began receiving positive reviews from critics such as John Crosby, who noted that Steiger regularly gave "effortless persuasive performances". Among Steiger's credits were Danger (1950–53), Lux Video Theatre (1951), Out There (1951), Tales of Tomorrow (1952–53), The Gulf Playhouse (1953), Medallion Theatre (1953), Goodyear Television Playhouse (1953), and as Shakespeare's Romeo in "The First Command Performance of Romeo and Juliet (1957)" episode of You Are There in 1954, under director Sidney Lumet. He continued to make appearances in various playhouse television productions, appearing in five episodes of Kraft Theatre (1952–54), which earned him praise from critics, six episodes of The Philco Television Playhouse (1951–55) and two episodes of Schlitz Playhouse of Stars (1957–58). Steiger made his big screen debut in 1953, with a small role in Fred Zinnemann's Teresa, shot in 1951. Steiger, who described himself as "cocky", won over Zinnemann by praising his direction. Zinnemann recalled that Steiger was "very popular, extremely articulate and full of remarkable memories", and the two remained highly respectful of each other for life.

On May 24, 1953, Steiger played the title role in Paddy Chayefsky's "Marty" episode of the Goodyear Television Playhouse. The role had originally been intended for Martin Ritt, who later became a director. "Marty" is the story of a lonely and homely butcher from the Bronx in search of love. The play was a critical success that increased Steiger's public exposure; Tom Stempel noted that he brought "striking intensity to his performance as Marty, particularly in giving us Marty's pain". As Steiger refused to sign a seven-year studio contract, he was replaced with Ernest Borgnine in the film Marty (1955), which won the Academy Award for Best Picture, as well as the Best Actor Oscar for Borgnine. 1953 proved to be Steiger's breakthrough year; he garnered Sylvania Awards for Marty and four other best performances of the year—as Vishinsky and Rudolf Hess in two episodes of You Are There, as gangster Dutch Schultz in a thriller, and as a radar operator in My Brother's Keeper.

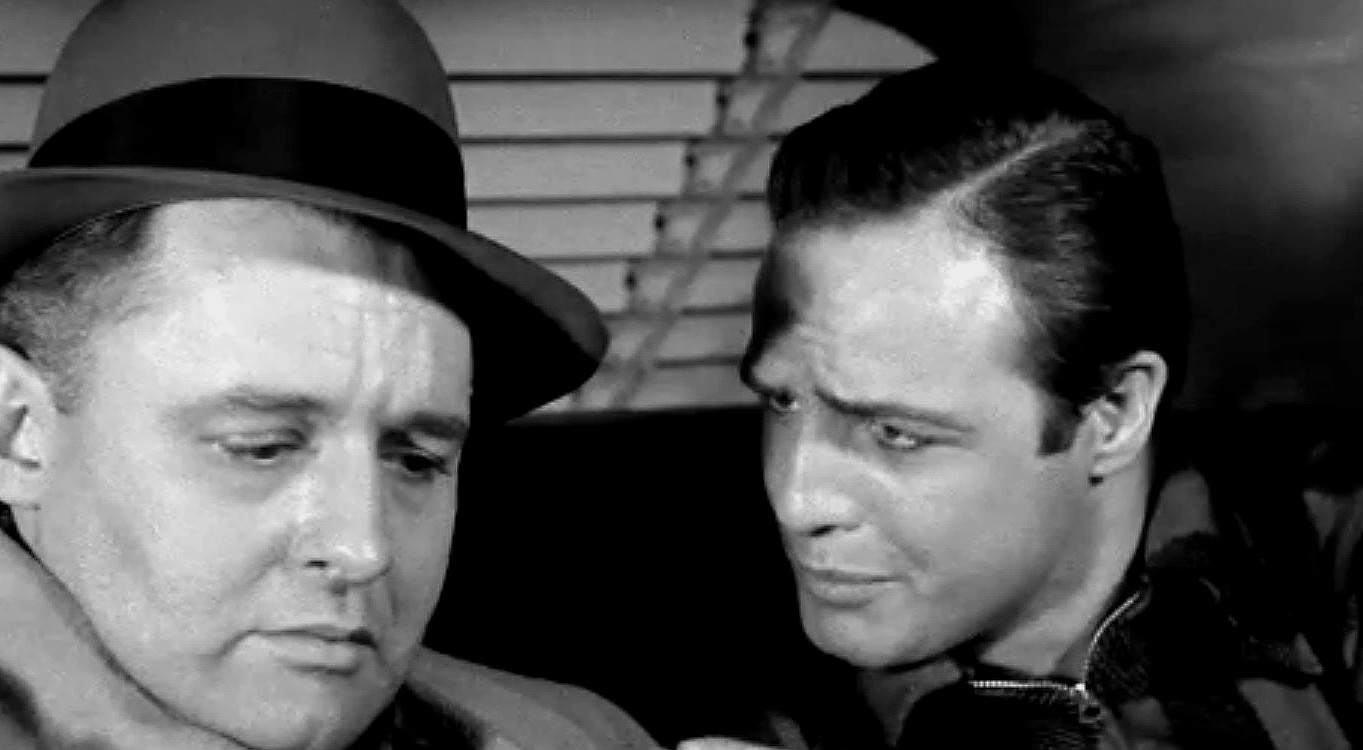
Steiger with Marlon Brando in On the Waterfront (1954)

For his role as Charley "the Gent", the brother of Marlon Brando's character in Elia Kazan's On the Waterfront (1954), Steiger was nominated for the Academy Award for Best Supporting Actor. Film writer Leo Braudy wrote that the "incessantly repeated images of its taxicab confrontation between Brando and Rod Steiger have made the film iconic". The taxicab scene took eleven hours to shoot and was heavily scripted, despite Brando fuelling the popular myth in his autobiography that the scene was improvised. Brando stated that seven takes were needed because Steiger could not stop crying, which Steiger found to be unfair and inaccurate. Although Steiger retained great respect for Brando as an actor, he disliked him as a person and frequently complained during the production of Brando's "predilection for leaving the set" immediately after shooting his scenes. Steiger later remarked: "We didn't get to know each other at all. He always flew solo and I haven't seen him since the film. I do resent him saying he's just a hooker, and that actors are whores". Steiger also responded unfavorably when he learned that Kazan had been awarded an honorary Oscar by the Academy in 1999. (Note: Elia Kazan had been a member of the Communist Party in the 1930s; in 1952, Kazan was called before the House Un-American Activities Committee which was investigating Communistic influence. Kazan supplied the committee with the names of eight people in the entertainment industry who were also members of the Communist Party in the 1930s. The names and information were used to create a blacklist for those working in the theatre which was similar to the Hollywood blacklist for entertainers working in motion pictures, radio and television. Many of those whose names wound up on one of the blacklists had their careers and lives ruined because of it. An argument was made by those who were against any type of blacklist that Kazan's supplying the names of the eight people had to do with monetary concerns and that he could have refused to reveal anyone's name. Kazan's friend, Arthur Miller, who had also been a member of the Communist Party, was brought before the committee in 1956. Miller refused to mention any names at the hearing. For his refusal, Miller was declared in contempt of Congress and given a fine and a prison sentence on May 31, 1957. His US passport was also revoked. Miller was cleared of the charges in August 1958.) In a 1999 interview with BBC News, Steiger said he probably would not have done On the Waterfront if he'd known at the time that Kazan had provided the House Un-American Activities Committee with names of performers suspected of being Communists.

Steiger played Jud Fry in the film version of the Rodgers and Hammerstein musical Oklahoma! (1955), in which he performed his own singing. It was one of the biggest location film productions of the 1950s, shot near Nogales, Arizona, with a crew of 325 people and some 70 trucks. Steiger portrayed a disturbed, emotionally isolated version of Jud, which television channel Turner Classic Movies (TCM) believed brought a "complexity to the character that went far beyond the stock musical villain". Steiger observed that James Dean, who auditioned for the role that went to Gordon MacRae, was a "nice kid absorbed by his own ego, so much so that it was destroying him", which he thought led to his death. Dean reportedly gave Steiger his prized copy of Ernest Hemingway's book Death in the Afternoon, and had underlined every appearance of the word "death".

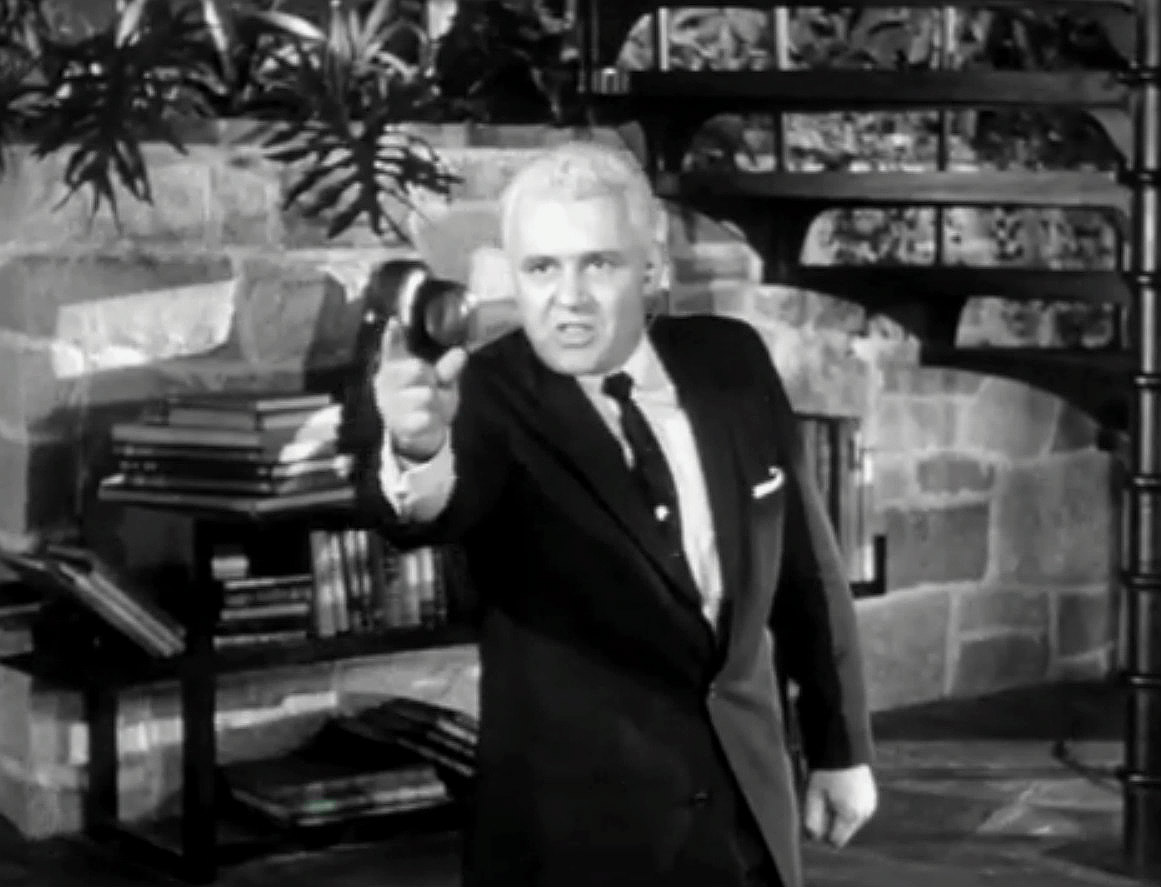
Steiger as film tycoon Stanley Shriner Hoff in The Big Knife (1955)

Later in 1955, Steiger played an obnoxious film tycoon, loosely based on Columbia boss Harry Cohn, (Note: Frank Sinatra biographer Kitty Kelley describes Cohn as a figure notorious for being the "nastiest man in Hollywood", who kept an autographed portrait of dictator Mussolini in his office during World War II.) opposite Jack Palance and Ida Lupino in Robert Aldrich's film noir The Big Knife. Steiger bleached his hair for the part, sought inspiration for the role from Russian actor Vladimir Sokoloff, read a book about the Treblinka extermination camp to understand his character thoroughly, and visited the perfume department of a store in Beverly Hills, California, to try to understand his character's contempt for women. Steiger and Palance did not get along during the production, and in one scene Palance threw several record albums at Steiger in frustration, feeling that he was trying to steal the scene. Steiger earned critical acclaim later that year for a role as a prosecuting major in Otto Preminger's The Court-Martial of Billy Mitchell, alongside Gary Cooper and Charles Bickford.

Steiger played the character "Pinky" in Columbia Pictures' western, Jubal (1956), which co-starred Glenn Ford and Ernest Borgnine. Steiger's character is a rancher, a "sneering baddie", who becomes jealous when his former mistress becomes attracted to Ford's character. Ford noted Steiger's deep commitment to method acting during production, considering him to be a "fine actor but a real strange fellow". Steiger disliked the experience and frequently clashed with director Delmer Daves, who was more favorable to Ford's lighthearted take on the film. Upon its release in April 1956, a writer for Variety was impressed with the "evil venom" displayed by his character, and remarked that there had not "been as hateful a screen heavy around in a long time".

In Mark Robson's 1956 boxing film noir The Harder They Fall, Steiger played a crooked boxing promoter who hires a sports journalist (Humphrey Bogart). Steiger referred to Bogart as "a professional" who had "tremendous authority" during filming.

=== Struggling actor (1957–1963) ===
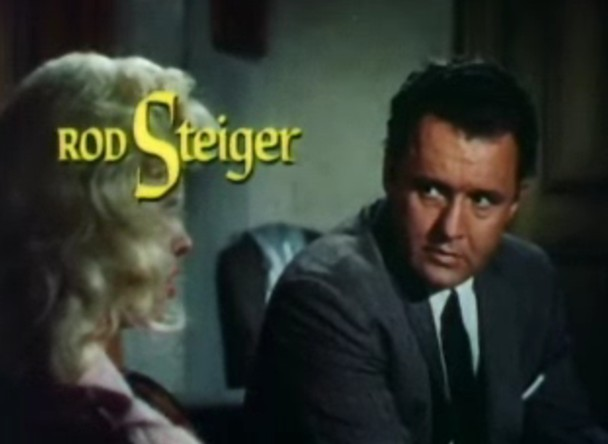
Steiger with Diana Dors in The Unholy Wife (1957)

Steiger appeared in three films released in 1957. The first was John Farrow's film noir The Unholy Wife, in which he played a wealthy Napa Valley vintner who marries a femme fatale named Phyllis (Diana Dors). In its original review of the film, The New York Times described Steiger's performance as "curious" further stating that the actor's voice modulation "ranges from Marlon Brando to Ronald Colman and back". During the production of Samuel Fuller's Run of the Arrow, in which he played a Confederate army veteran who refuses to accept defeat following the surrender of General Robert E. Lee at Appomattox at the end of the American Civil War, Steiger badly sprained his ankle before shooting one of the battle scenes and was unable to walk, let alone run. Fuller instead got one of the Native American extras to run in Steiger's place, which is why the scene was shot showing only the feet, instead of using close-ups. Steiger had researched the history behind the film and decided to play the character as an Irishman, becoming "the first Irish cowboy" as he put it. Later that year, Steiger took the lead role in the British thriller Across the Bridge, in which he played a German conman with British citizenship who goes into hiding in Mexico after embezzling company funds. Film critic Dennis Schwartz stated that Steiger gave "one of his greatest performances".

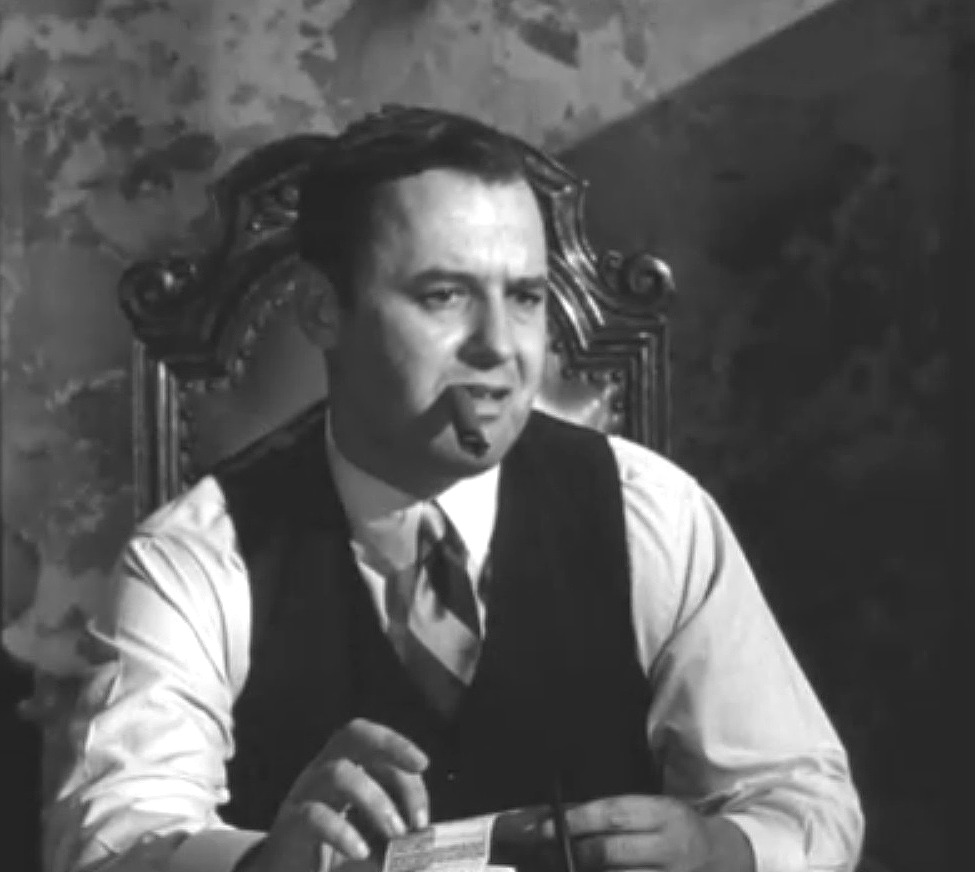
Steiger as Al Capone (1959)

Steiger portrayed a mastermind criminal seeking to obtain a $500,000 ransom, opposite James Mason and Inger Stevens, in Andrew L. Stone's Cry Terror! (1958) for Metro-Goldwyn-Mayer. Paul Beckley of the Herald Tribune had thought Steiger "superbly laconic", but Dennis Schwartz dismissed the film as "an ill-conceived attempt" with "too many coincidences and contrived plot points to sustain interest". The following year, Steiger appeared with Claire Bloom (whom he later married) in a Fay and Michael Kanin stage production of Akira Kurosawa's 1950 film, Rashomon, where he enacted the role of the bandit originally played by Toshiro Mifune. A major success, it was lauded by critics and nominated for three Tony Awards. Robert Coleman of the Daily Mirror described Steiger's performance as "magnificently animalish", while Kenneth Tynan of The New Yorker thought the acting helped set new standards for Broadway. The same year, Steiger portrayed iconic mobster Al Capone in the film of the same name. (Note: Steiger refused the producers' first offer to star in this film because he had thought that the initial screenplay inappropriately romanticized Capone and criminality, which led to him turning down the picture on three occasions. According to Sean Axmaker of TCM, Steiger only agreed to play the role on condition that the producers rewrite the script.) Steiger was particularly keen on demonstrating the showiness of Capone, speaking thunderously, slinging a camel-hair coat over his shoulders and wearing his hat at a jaunty angle. The film, noted for its deglamorized portrayal of the subject, earned Steiger a Laurel Award for Best Male Dramatic Performance nomination. Although Hutchinson, author of Rod Steiger: Memoirs of a Friendship, perceived Steiger's portrayal of Capone to be more of a caricature, George Anastasia and Glen Macnow, authors of the book The Ultimate Book of Gangster Movies, described it as one of the best screen portrayals of Capone.

Following the success of Al Capone, Steiger played sophisticated thief Paul Mason, who masterminds a caper to steal $4 million in French francs from the underground vault of the casino of Monte Carlo, in the Henry Hathaway heist film Seven Thieves (1960). Bosley Crowther of The New York Times gave a positive review of the film, praising the "nerve-rackingly delicate plot" and the "most elaborate roles" of Steiger and his co-star, Edward G. Robinson. The following year, he took the part of a prison psychiatrist who tries to cure the psychological demons of Stuart Whitman's character in The Mark. Steiger's performance was so convincing that, after the film was released, he received a call from a psychiatric institution asking him to attend one of their board meetings. The Mark was followed by a role in the European film production of World in My Pocket alongside Nadja Tiller. Steiger increasingly played in films in Italy and France during this period. Not only did he believe he had greater credibility and esteem as an actor in Europe, but he approved of the more relaxed filming schedule prevalent there at that time.

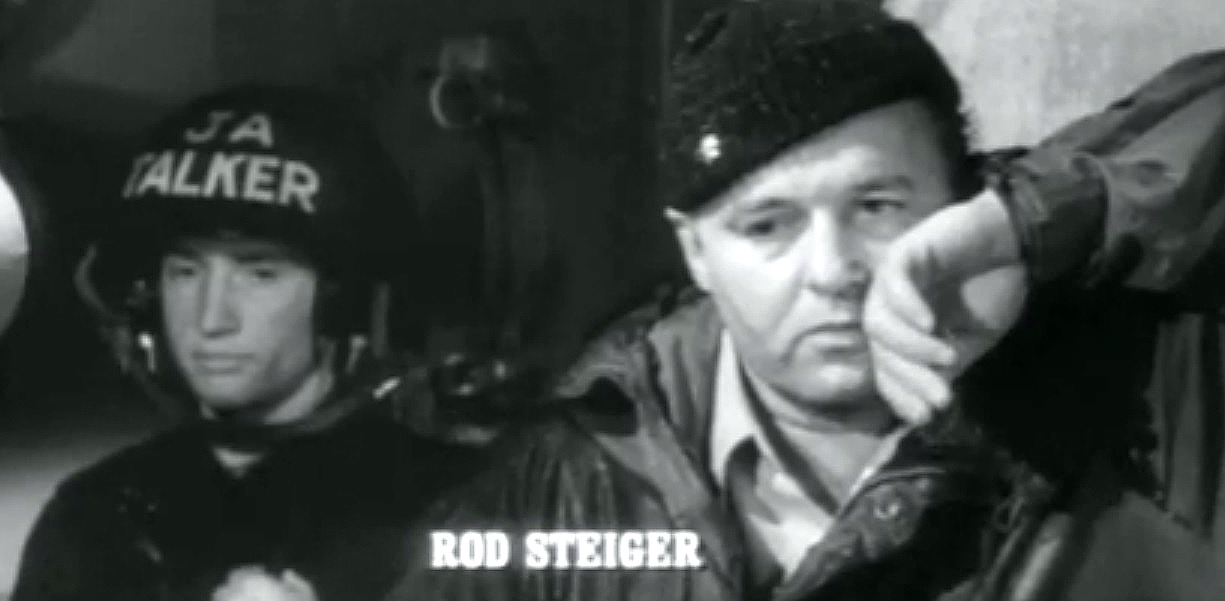
Steiger in The Longest Day (1962)

In 1962, Steiger appeared on Broadway in Moby Dick—Rehearsed, at the Ethel Barrymore Theatre, as well as playing a detective searching for a scientist's (Alan Ladd) mugger in Philip Leacock's 13 West Street for Columbia Pictures. Steiger played a small role of a destroyer commander among the large ensemble cast of The Longest Day, which included John Wayne, Richard Todd, Robert Mitchum, Richard Burton, Sean Connery, and Henry Fonda. According to co-star Richard Burton, Steiger had privately admitted to him that he was in financial trouble at the time and had a face lift, which Burton thought made him look like "one half of a naked ass-hole". The following year, Steiger played ruthless Neapolitan land developer and city councilman Edoardo Nottola, who uses his political power to make personal profit in a large scale suburban real estate deal, in Francesco Rosi's Italian drama film Hands over the City (1963). According to biographer Francesco Bolzoni, Rosi had cast Steiger in the Italian-language film because he had wanted "a rich interpreter of great capacity" in the part of the land developer.

=== Mainstream film acclaim (1964–1969) ===
Well they never went away. 'The Pawnbroker', directed by Sidney Lumet, was an independent, so was 'The Sergeant'. They're just coming back stronger because the greed finally ran into a wall, and what proved it was all these small independent films getting nominations and winning awards where all these multi-million dollar films did nothing, and that really shook them up. I would always say the bigger the budget, the less imagination. In the old days, they had designers who, if they had to create a battleship, would get a bit of net and a bit of board and make one. Now there is no imagination. If they want a destroyer now, they ring up the government and get a real one. There aren't any challenges any more; they're home decorators.

— Steiger on appearing in independent films

Shortly after Hands over the City, Steiger agreed to appear in another Italian film, Time of Indifference (1964), in which he starred opposite Claudia Cardinale and Shelley Winters. Though Steiger's powerful performance was unaffected, the production was marred by a dispute between director Francesco Maselli and producer Franco Cristaldi, with one wanting it to be a purely political film and the other wanting emphasis on the erotic subplot and his relationship with Cardinale. In Sidney Lumet's gritty drama The Pawnbroker (1964), Steiger played an embittered, emotionally withdrawn survivor of the Holocaust living in New York City. Richard Harland Smith of TCM notes that Steiger's career was waning at the time, and he had to "scramble for paying gigs for a decade" before getting this part. Steiger agreed to a reduced fee of $50,000. He read Edward Lewis Wallant's novel and the script many times to develop an intimate understanding of the character, and insisted on reducing his lines to make his character more realistic and alienated from society. Lumet noted that during the production Steiger had a tendency to be overly dramatic, stating: "Sure, Rod has weaknesses of rhetoric, but you can talk them through with him. I explained that this solitary Jew could not rise to heights of emotion; he had been hammered by life and by people. The faith he had to find was in other people, because God had betrayed him."

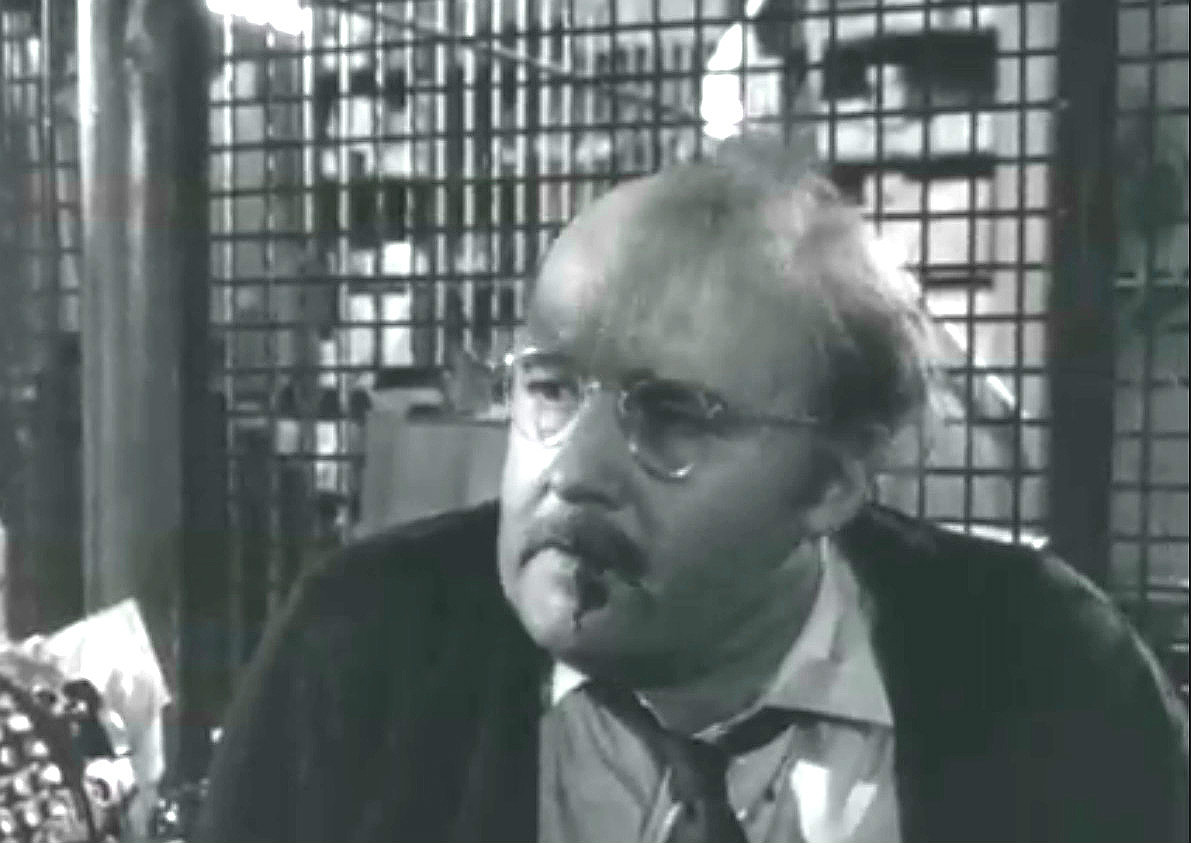
Steiger in The Pawnbroker (1964)

Steiger remarked of the film: "I think my best work is in The Pawnbroker. The last scene, where I find the boy dead on the street. I think that's the highest moment, whatever it may be, with my talent." He drew upon inspiration for this climactic scene, in which he appears to show his frustration through a silent scream, from Picasso's Guernica, which depicts war-ravaged villagers. Cecil Wilson of the Daily Mail wrote that Steiger's character "seems to encompass all the agony ever inflicted on man". Although the film attracted controversy and was accused of antisemitism, (Note: The film caused considerable controversy among both Jewish and African-American communities. Several Jewish organizations propagated a boycott of the film due to "its uncompromising presentation of the Jewish pawnbroker which they felt encouraged anti-Semitism". A number of Black groups also accused the film of advocating racial stereotypes of the inner city, due to its portrayal of pimps, prostitutes and drug addicts.) Steiger was widely acclaimed for his performance, which garnered him the prize for Best Actor at the Berlin International Film Festival and his second Best Actor nomination at the Oscars. Steiger was certain that he had produced an Oscar-winning performance; he was shocked when he lost to Lee Marvin. (Note: The Academy loss was a major wake up call for him. Steiger scolded himself for it: "Listen, jackass, never take happiness, never take your talent, for granted. Never in any walk of life, take for granted your capabilities. Each minute a second of life is a challenge—so sit still, schmuck, and let this be a lesson to you. Happiness has to be earned and respected. Rewards must never be taken for granted".)

In 1965, Steiger played an effeminate embalmer in Tony Richardson's comedy The Loved One, about the funeral business in Los Angeles, based on the 1948 short satirical novel by Evelyn Waugh. His curly-haired appearance in the film was modeled on a bust of Apollo he once saw while meeting Richardson. Steiger offended Bosley Crowther of The New York Times, who found his character repellent. His next role, as Victor Komarovsky, a Russian politician and "villainous opportunist" who rapes Julie Christie's character in David Lean's Doctor Zhivago (1965), was one of his favorites. Steiger, one of only two Americans in the cast, was initially apprehensive about working with such great British actors as Ralph Richardson and Alec Guinness, and was pleased when the film was completed that he did not stand out as an American. The film was the biggest international box office draw of the 1960s, grossing $200 million worldwide. It has since been acclaimed as one of the greatest films ever made, and in 1998 was selected as the 39th best American film in the original AFI's 100 Years...100 Movies list by the American Film Institute.

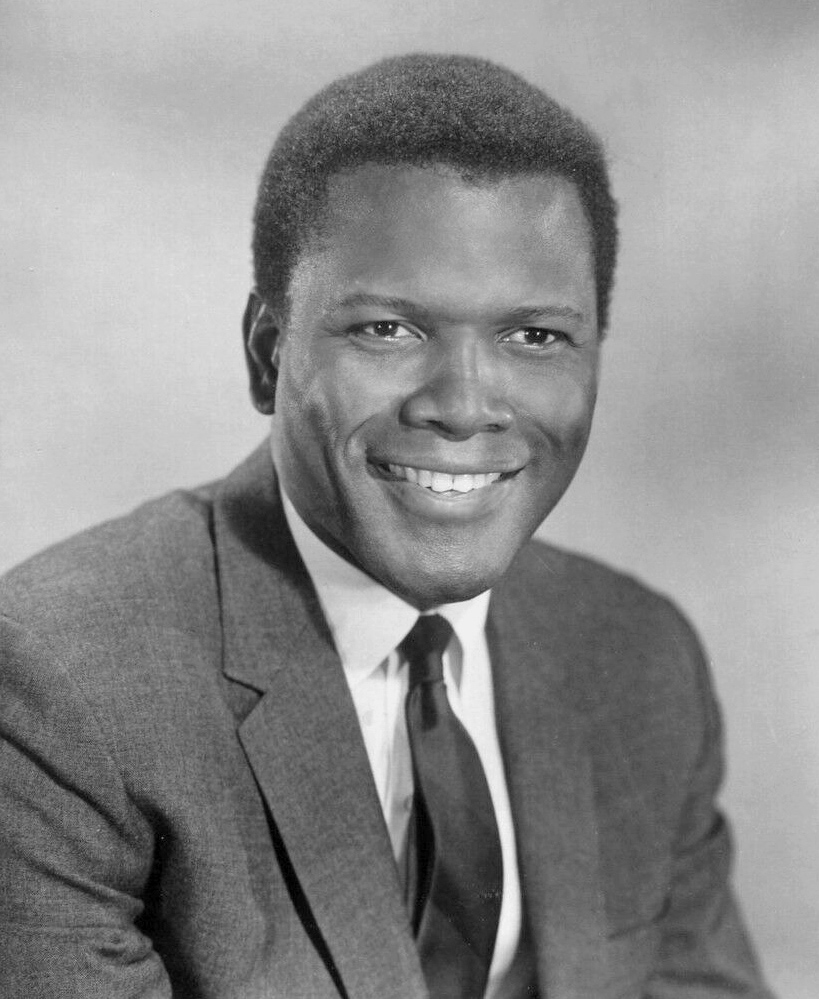
Sidney Poitier considered Steiger and Spencer Tracy to be the finest actors with whom he ever worked.

Steiger had intended returning to the stage, and had signed on to play the title character in Bertolt Brecht's Galileo, at the Lincoln Center Repertory Theater in April 1967, but the production was cancelled when he became ill. Steiger won the Best Actor Oscar for his portrayal of Chief of Police Bill Gillespie in In the Heat of the Night, opposite Sidney Poitier. He played a Southern police chief searching for a murderer. A stereotypical Southern racist, he jumps to the conclusion that the culprit is Virgil Tibbs (Poitier), an African-American man passing through town after visiting his mother, who later turns out to be an experienced homicide detective from Philadelphia. The film deals with the way the two men interact and join forces in solving the crime, as Steiger's Gillespie learns to greatly respect the black man he initially took to be a criminal. Steiger drew upon his experience in the Navy with a Southerner named "King", remembering his accent. Poitier considered Steiger and Spencer Tracy to have been the finest actors he had ever worked with, remarking in 1995, "He's so good he made me dig into bags I never knew I had." A. D. Murphy of Variety described Steiger's performance as "outstanding", writing: "Steiger's transformation from a diehard Dixie bigot to a man who learns to respect Poitier stands out in smooth comparison to the wandering solution of the murder." Steiger won a plethora of other awards, including a BAFTA, a Golden Globe, and awards for Best Actor from the National Society of Film Critics and the New York Film Critics Circle.

In 1968, Steiger played a serial killer opposite George Segal in Jack Smight's black comedy thriller No Way to Treat a Lady. During the course of the film, he adopts various disguises, including those of an Irish priest, a New York City policeman, a German plumber, and a gay hairdresser, to avoid being identified and to put his victims at ease, before strangling them and painting a pair of lips on their foreheads with garish red lipstick. The film and Steiger's performance were critically acclaimed, with Vincent Canby of The New York Times highlighting Steiger's "beautifully uninhibited performance as a hammy", and a writer for Time Out describing him as "brilliant as a sort of Boston strangler, son of a great actress who has left her boy with a mother fixation".

Later in 1968, Steiger played a repressed gay non-commissioned officer opposite John Phillip Law in John Flynn's The Sergeant for Warner Bros.-Seven Arts, which earned him the David di Donatello Award for Best Foreign Actor. Despite the award win, film critic Pauline Kael of The New Yorker was particularly critical of the casting of Steiger as a homosexual and felt that he was "totally outside his range", to which Steiger concurred that he was ineffective.

Steiger was cast as a short-tempered tattooed man with soon-to-be ex-wife Claire Bloom in the science fiction picture The Illustrated Man (1969). The film was a critical and commercial failure, and Ray Bradbury said: "Rod was very good in it, but it wasn't a good film ... the script was terrible". Steiger had better luck alongside Bloom later that year in Peter Hall's British drama Three into Two Won't Go, playing an Irishman who cheats on his wife with a young hiker. It was entered into the Berlin International Film Festival and became the 19th most popular film at the UK box office in 1969.

=== Historical roles and declining fortunes (1970–1981) ===
Steiger was offered the title role in Patton (1970), but turned it down because he did not want to glorify war. The role was then given to George C. Scott, who won the Best Actor Oscar for his performance. Steiger called this refusal his "dumbest career move", remarking, "I got on my high horse. I thought I was a pacifist." Instead, he chose to portray Napoleon Bonaparte opposite Christopher Plummer in Sergei Bondarchuk's Waterloo (1970), a co-production between the Soviet Union and Italy. Anatoly Efros wrote: "I watched with extraordinary respect, no, that is not the right word, with enthusiasm, the acting of Rod Steiger in the role of Napoleon in Waterloo", while literary critic Daniel S. Burt describes Steiger's Napoleon as an "unusual interpretation", finding him less convincing than Plummer's Wellington.

In 1971, Steiger played a chauvinistic big game hunter, explorer and war hero opposite Susannah York in Mark Robson's Happy Birthday, Wanda June, before agreeing to star alongside James Coburn as Mexican bandit Juan Miranda in Sergio Leone's Duck, You Sucker!, which was alternatively titled A Fistful of Dynamite. Leone was initially dissatisfied with his performance in that he played his character as a serious, Zapata-like figure. As a result, tension grew between Steiger and Leone, including one incident that ended with Steiger walking off during the filming of the scene where Juan's stagecoach is destroyed. After the film's completion, Leone and Steiger were content with the final result, and Steiger praised Leone for his skills as a director. Steiger auditioned for the role of Michael Corleone in Francis Ford Coppola's The Godfather (1972), a film adaptation of Italian American author Mario Puzo's 1969 novel of the same name, but Puzo felt that Steiger was too old for the part and rejected him.

Steiger played a rural Tennessee patriarch and father of Jeff Bridges, at odds with Robert Ryan's character, in Lolly-Madonna XXX (1973), which received mixed reviews. Later that year he was cast as the turban-wearing German officer Guenther von Lutz in Duccio Tessari's Italian war comedy The Heroes, opposite Rod Taylor, and appeared as "foul-mouthed Sicilian mobster" Eugenio Giannini opposite Gian Maria Volonté's Lucky Luciano in Francesco Rosi's film of the same name.

In 1975, Steiger portrayed Italian dictator Benito Mussolini in Carlo Lizzani's Last Days of Mussolini, which received a positive critical reception. He appeared in Claude Chabrol's French picture Innocents with Dirty Hands, playing the role of Louis Wormser, the wealthy alcoholic husband of Romy Schneider's character Julie Wormser. It was poorly received by critics, and Steiger found the director, whom he had admired, a bitter disappointment. He was highly critical of Chabrol's lack of communication and aloofness from the production, and preference for playing chess on set instead of talking through scenes. Vincent Canby of The New York Times dismissed it as "little more than a soap opera", writing: "The performances are of a piece—uniformly atrocious. Mr. Steiger surpasses his own earlier records for lumbering busyness. Within his first few minutes on screen he (1) gets drunk, (2) whines, (3) pleads for understanding, (4) weeps and (5) goes to bed alone." Later that year, Steiger starred as an Irish Republican Army terrorist who plans to blow up the Houses of Parliament in Don Sharp's British thriller Hennessy. John Simon of New York Magazine wrote: "This fellow Hennessy, as played by Rod Steiger, is about as interesting and likable as a Guy Fawkes dummy."

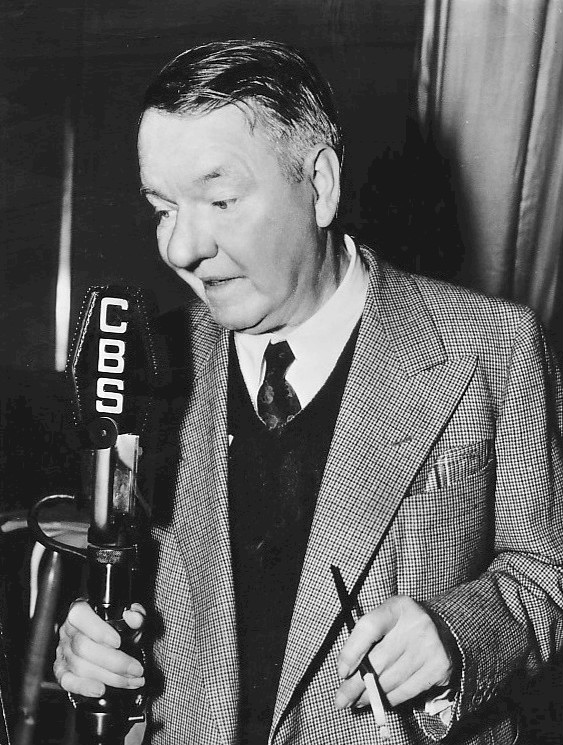
W. C. Fields: Steiger's portrayal of him was poorly received by critics.

The following year, Steiger portrayed the comic actor W. C. Fields in an Arthur Hiller biopic, W. C. Fields and Me, for Universal Pictures. The screenplay, which was based on a memoir by Carlotta Monti, who was Fields' mistress for the last 14 years of his life, was penned by Bob Merrill. Steiger read extensively about Fields in preparation for the role, and developed an encyclopaedic knowledge of his career and personal life. He concluded that he would base his characterization around his performance in The Bank Dick (1940). One day, Fields' mistress Monti turned up on set, and watched the scene where he briefly thanks everybody. Nervous that she might not approve, he broke down in tears after Monti met him after the scene and fondly said "Woody, Woody, Woody, My Woody", a nickname used only by those very close to Fields. Despite the energy Steiger put into the picture, like the actor's previous recent films, it was poorly received by critics. Canby called it "dreadful" and described Steiger's portrayal of Fields as a "wax dummy of a character". Lucia Bozzola of The New York Times later referred to Steiger's portrayal of Fields as "superb", but noted that his Hollywood career had "undeniably fallen from his 1950s and '60s heights".

Steiger played Pontius Pilate in Franco Zeffirelli's TV miniseries Jesus of Nazareth (1977). Stacy Keach, who portrayed Barabbas, expressed his joy at the opportunity to work with Steiger, describing him as "generous and opinionated". In 1978, Steiger played a senator in Norman Jewison's F.I.S.T., opposite Sylvester Stallone, who played a Cleveland warehouse worker involved in the labor union leadership of the fictional organisation named Federation of Inter-State Truckers. Love and Bullets, later that year, in which Steiger appeared as a mafia boss, was poorly received; Roger Ebert dismissed it as a "hopelessly confused hodgepodge of chases, killings, enigmatic meetings and separations, and insufferably overacted scenes by Steiger alternating with alarmingly underacted scenes by [Charles] Bronson". The following year, Steiger was cast as a general opposite Richard Burton and Robert Mitchum in Andrew V. McLaglen's war film Breakthrough, set on the Western Front. In The Amityville Horror (1979), Steiger appeared as a disturbed priest, who is invited to perform an exorcism on a haunted house. Again Steiger was accused of overacting; Janet Maslin of The New York Times wrote: "Mr. Steiger bellows and weeps and overdoes absolutely everything. He won't even pick up the phone before it's rung 12 or 15 times." Pauline Kael thought that Steiger's "spiritual agony was enough to shatter the camera lens".

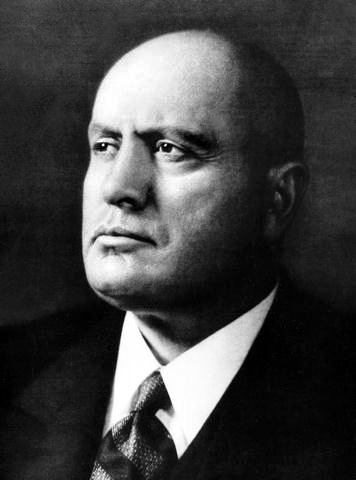
Benito Mussolini: Steiger portrayed him for the second time on screen in 1981's Libyan-funded Lion of the Desert.

In 1980, Steiger received two Genie Award for Best Performance by a Foreign Actor nominations for his roles in Klondike Fever and The Lucky Star, both Canadian productions. Klondike Fever is based on Jack London's journey from San Francisco to the Klondike gold fields in 1898. Steiger revisited his role as Mussolini in Lion of the Desert, a production that was financed by Muammar Gaddafi, and which co-starred Anthony Quinn as Bedouin tribal leader Omar Mukhtar, fighting the Italian army in the years leading up to World War II. The Italian authorities reportedly banned the film in 1982, as it was considered damaging to the army, and it was not shown on Italian television until a state visit by Gaddafi in 2009. It received critical acclaim in Britain, where it was praised in particular for the quality of its battle scenes. Later in 1981, Steiger won the Montréal World Film Festival Award for Best Actor for his portrayal of white-bearded Orthodox rabbi Reb Saunders in Jeremy Kagan's The Chosen. Janet Maslin commented that Steiger's "slow, rolling delivery" was more "numbing than prepossessing", though a critic from Variety thought it an "exceptional performance as the somewhat tyrannical but loving patriarch".

=== B-movies and criticism (1982–1994) ===
After his open-heart surgery in 1979, clinical depression and health problems during the 1980s directly affected Steiger's career, and he often turned to B movies, low-budget, independent productions, and TV miniseries. He admitted that during this period he accepted "everything I was offered", and knew that many of the films he appeared in were not great, but wanted to demonstrate his strong work ethic despite his issues. He later regretted the poorer films in which he appeared during the 1980s, and wished he had done more stage work. He sank into an even deeper depression when he was not involved in acting, but it bothered him more that his acting career had taken a turn for the worse and was no longer challenging. The major studio producers were wary of his problems and considered him a liability. Steiger spoke about the experience to a younger colleague while advising: "Never tell anyone if you've got heart problems, kid. Never." His reputation as a fine character actor remained intact, and Joel Hirschhorn at the time considered his talent to be "as strong as ever".

In 1984, Steiger starred as a detective assigned to investigate the murder of a Chicago psychoanalyst (Roger Moore), a man whom he detests from a previous case, in Bryan Forbes's The Naked Face. Richard Christiansen of the Chicago Tribune referred to it as a "wimpy suspense movie shot in Chicago in the fall of 1983, [that] doesn't do much good for the city or for anyone connected with it", and considered Steiger to be "acting in his high hysteria gear", who "snarls and whines and overacts". Steiger took a break from cinema in the mid-1980s, during which he appeared in the Yorkshire Television mini-series The Glory Boys (1984) with Anthony Perkins, and Hollywood Wives (1985) with Angie Dickinson. Steiger and Perkins were at loggerheads during the production of The Glory Boys. Perkins resented the fact that Steiger insisted on a bigger trailer and felt that Steiger was trying to steal scenes from him, while Steiger had thought Perkins "so jittery and jinxed by the chemicals he was taking" that he felt sorry for him and believed that he was jeopardizing the success of the film. Steiger also performed on Joni Mitchell's 1985 album Dog Eat Dog, where he provided the voice of an evangelist in the song "Tax Free".

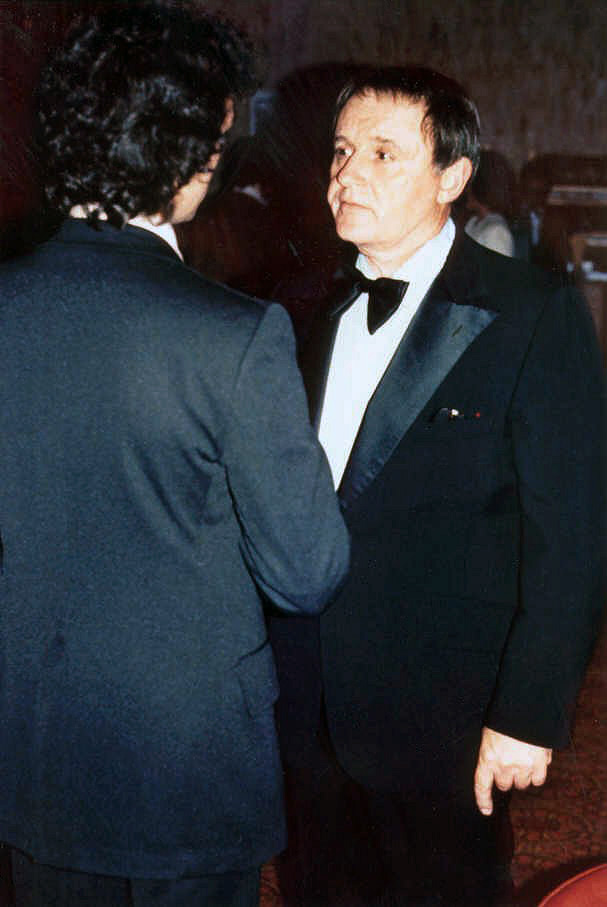
Steiger in 1978 for the premiere of F. I. S. T.

Steiger played a villain/antagonist role in the Argentine-American film Catch the Heat (1987), an action/martial arts picture about two undercover agents of the law who fight against an American-Brazilian drug baron who smuggles drugs into the United States inside showgirls' breast implants. According to director Fred Olen Ray, it was pulled from distribution within a week of release. In 1988, Steiger and Yvonne De Carlo played a spooky elderly couple with developmentally delayed children in John Hough's horror film American Gothic. Universally panned by the critics, Caryn James of The New York Times wrote: "Mr. Steiger addresses the camera as if he were reciting Shakespeare, he is truly, straightforwardly, hilariously bad." During the last year of the decade he played authority figures, including a mayor in The January Man, and as Judge Prescott in Tennessee Waltz. Although Steiger admitted that his performance in The January Man was "way over the top", he enjoyed the experience, thereby marking a positive turning point after a period of clinical depression.

In 1990, Steiger starred in Men of Respect, a crime drama film adaptation of William Shakespeare's play Macbeth. He played a character based on King Duncan, opposite John Turturro as Mike Battaglia (Macbeth), who plays a Mafia hitman who climbs his way to the top by killing Steiger's character. The film was critically panned, with Roger Ebert awarding it one star out of four, describing the concept as a "very, very bad idea". Steiger played another mobster, Sam Giancana, two years later in the miniseries Sinatra (1992).

Steiger portrayed a reverend living in a small town in the American South in the macabre Merchant Ivory film production The Ballad of the Sad Café (1991), co-starring Vanessa Redgrave and Keith Carradine. The film met with generally lukewarm reviews, though it was entered into the 41st Berlin International Film Festival. Steiger auditioned for the part of an elderly Irishman in Ron Howard's Far and Away, starring Tom Cruise and Nicole Kidman. Steiger, who had long been bald, was ordered by Howard to wear a wig to the audition. He resented the fact that Howard insisted on taping the audition, which he believed to be a form of humiliation for actors, serving as after-dinner entertainment for the Hollywood executives. Steiger never forgave Howard, whom he referred to as a "cocksucker", for rejecting him for the part and giving it to Cyril Cusack.

In 1993, Steiger portrayed an aging gynaecologist who terrorizes his urban neighbors in a rural community in Burlington, Vermont, in The Neighbor. Dennis Schwartz considered it to have been one of Steiger's creepiest roles, though he thought that the poor script had rendered the role awkward and "mildly entertaining in the sense that Steiger is asked to carry the film and hams it up". The following year, Steiger agreed to play the role of a Cuban mob boss opposite Sylvester Stallone and Sharon Stone in Luis Llosa's thriller The Specialist, citing its purpose as a "$40 million commercial" to show a new generation that he existed. Critics panned the film, which has a four percent approval rating on Rotten Tomatoes based on 27 reviews as of July 2015. The role earned Steiger a Golden Raspberry Award for Worst Supporting Actor nomination, and the film was listed in The Official Razzie Movie Guide as one of "The 100 Most Enjoyably Bad Movies Ever Made".

=== Later work and final years (1995–2002) ===
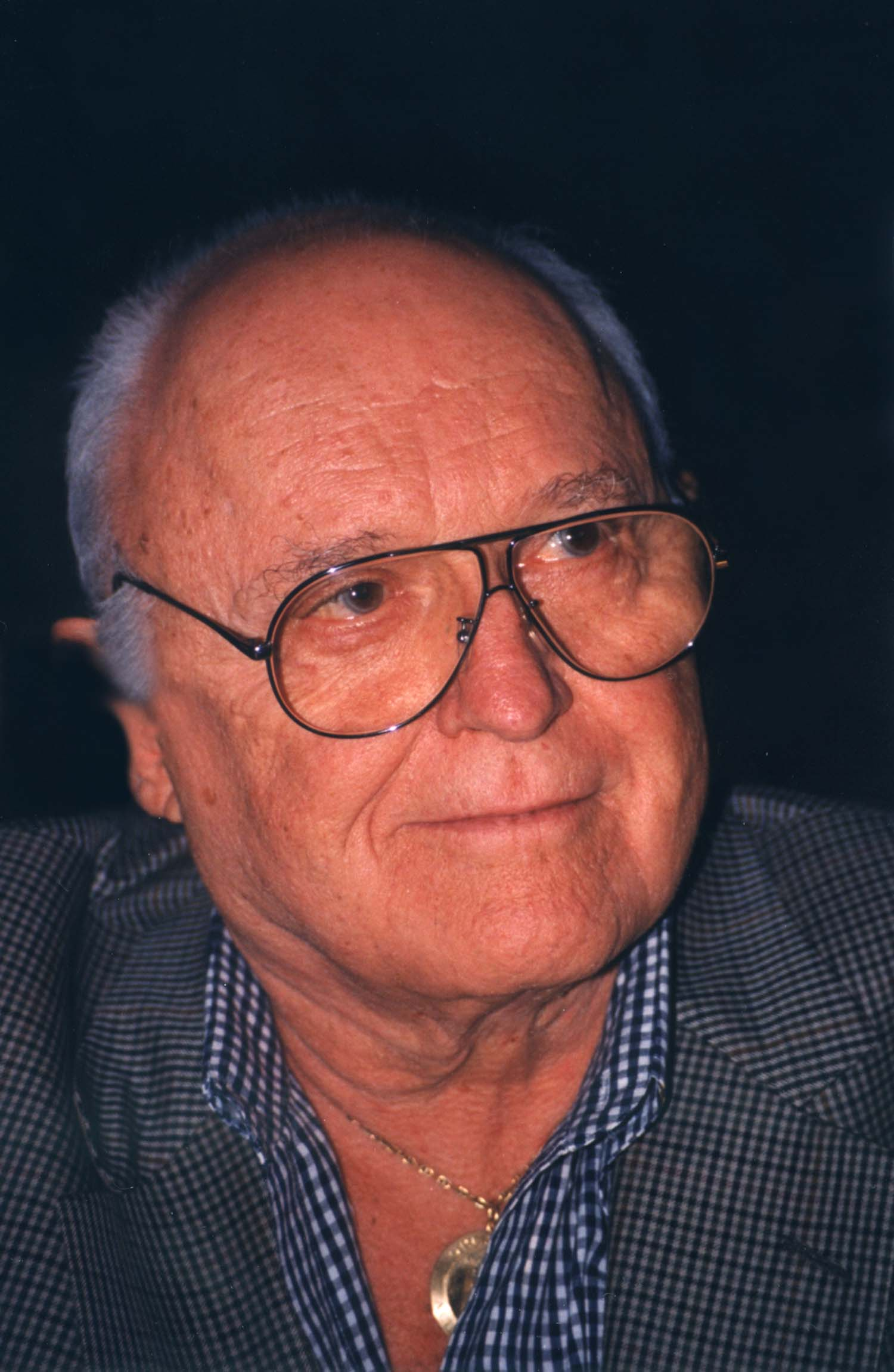
Steiger in 1995

Following The Specialist (1994), Steiger appeared in Tom Clancy's Op Center (1995), a film that was edited down into a TV miniseries, and featured in a Columbo television film, Strange Bedfellows. The following year, he took a minor role as Doc Wallace in the Dale Rosenbloom family drama Shiloh. He reprised the role three years later in the sequel, Shiloh 2: Shiloh Season. Also in 1996, Steiger played a "jingoistic top general" who "petitions the president to go nuclear in the middle of a global crisis" in the ensemble Tim Burton production of Mars Attacks!.

In 1997, Steiger played Tony Vago, the mob boss of Vincent Gallo's character in Kiefer Sutherland's Truth or Consequences, N.M., a gritty noir about a drug heist gone wrong.He portrayed the protagonist's father and moral conscience Milton Donovan in John Badham's heist thriller Incognito. Steiger played judges in Antonio Banderas's comedy-drama Crazy in Alabama and in the prison drama, The Hurricane, both in 1999, the latter of which tells the story of former middleweight boxer Rubin Carter, who was wrongly convicted of a triple homicide in a bar in Paterson, New Jersey. The Hurricane reunited Steiger with Norman Jewison, who had directed him in In the Heat of the Night. Steiger portrayed H. Lee Sarokin, the judge responsible for freeing Carter. Sarokin thought it was a "marvellous film" that was Oscar-worthy, but found Steiger's portrayal as overacted and a "little arrogant and pompous".

After a minor role as a "bombastic priest" in End of Days (1999), Steiger was one of the lead actors in Burt Reynolds's The Last Producer (2000), a film about a washed-up, veteran producer (Reynolds) who tries to re-enter the movie business by producing a new film. Steiger's last film role was as the billiard hall manager, Nick, in Poolhall Junkies (2002); it was poorly received by critics.

== Personal life ==
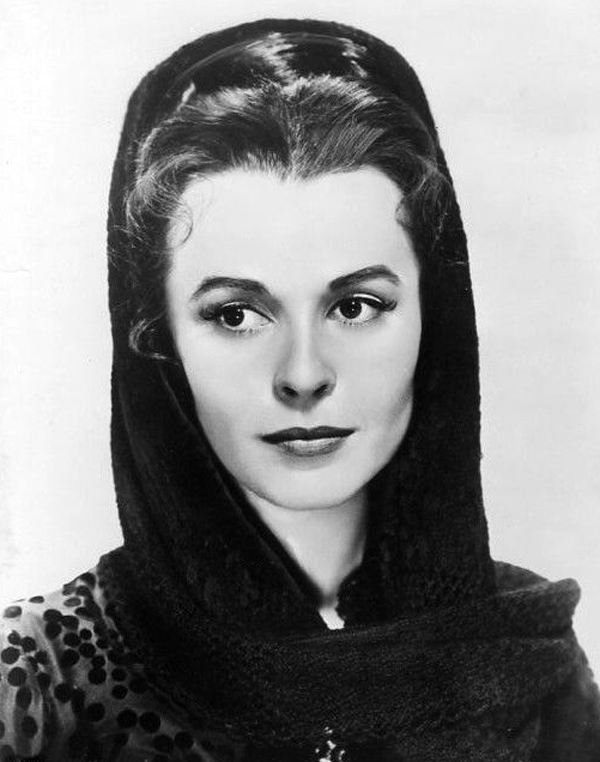
Actress Claire Bloom, in 1958, who was married to Steiger for ten years

Steiger was married five times: he married actress Sally Gracie (1952–1958), actress Claire Bloom (1959–1969), secretary Sherry Nelson (1973–1979), singer Paula Ellis (1986–1997) and actress Joan Benedict Steiger (married 2000 until his death). He had a daughter, opera singer Anna Steiger (born in 1960) by Bloom, and a son, Michael Steiger (born in 1993), from his marriage to Ellis. In an interview with journalist Kenneth Passingham, Steiger stated that Bloom was "all I ever wanted in a woman", and that "maybe our marriage was better than most because we were both established when we met." The couple bought a home in Malibu, California, a community that appealed to Steiger but which Bloom found boring. They also purchased an apartment in Manhattan and a cottage in County Galway, close to John Huston's home. Financial considerations led Steiger to sell their New York apartment in the mid-1970s. It upset him greatly when his marriage with Bloom ended in 1969 and that she quickly remarried Broadway producer Hillard Elkins the same year, a man whom Steiger had entrusted to care for her while he was away shooting Waterloo. Steiger was also close friends with actress Elizabeth Taylor.

Steiger was an outspoken critic of McCarthyism. He later clashed on the subject with Charlton Heston, and referred to Heston as "America's favourite fascist." For example, Heston published a column in the Los Angeles Times saying that he was shocked that the American Film Institute had not honored Elia Kazan, who had cooperated with the House Un-American Activities Committee and named several Communists. Steiger wrote a response letter, describing himself as "appalled, appalled, appalled," and saying that Kazan's actions had resulted in actors and writers being forced to drive cabs because they were blacklisted and even committing suicide as a result. Heston did not reply.

Steiger suffered from depression throughout much of his life. He described himself as "incapacitated for about eight years with clinical depression" before his Oscar win for In The Heat of the Night. His career problems from the 1970s onward were often exacerbated by health issues. He underwent open-heart surgery in 1976 and again in 1979 and struggled with obesity, though certain roles, such as Napoleon, required him to intentionally gain weight. After the decline of his third marriage in 1979, a deep depression, partly a side effect of his surgery, negatively affected his career during the 1980s. He became increasingly reclusive during this period, often confining himself to his apartment, watching American football for several hours. He said of the experience: "You begin to lose self-esteem. You don't walk, you don't shave and if no one was watching you'd go to the bathroom right where you were sitting". He would lie in bed at night thinking, "You'll never act again. Why bother? You're no good". Despite these challenges, Steiger continued to act into the 1990s and early 2000s. In one of his final interviews, he stated that there was a stigma wrongfully attached to sufferers of depression and that it was caused by a chemical imbalance, not a mental disease. He commented: "Pain must never be a source of shame. It's a part of life, it's part of humanity."

== Death ==
Steiger died in a Westside hospital in Los Angeles on July 9, 2002, at age 77, of pneumonia and kidney failure as a result of complications from surgery for a gallbladder tumor. He was buried in Forest Lawn – Hollywood Hills Cemetery. The film Saving Shiloh, released in 2006, was dedicated to his memory because he played Doc Wallace in the first two films of the series.

== Technique and reputation ==
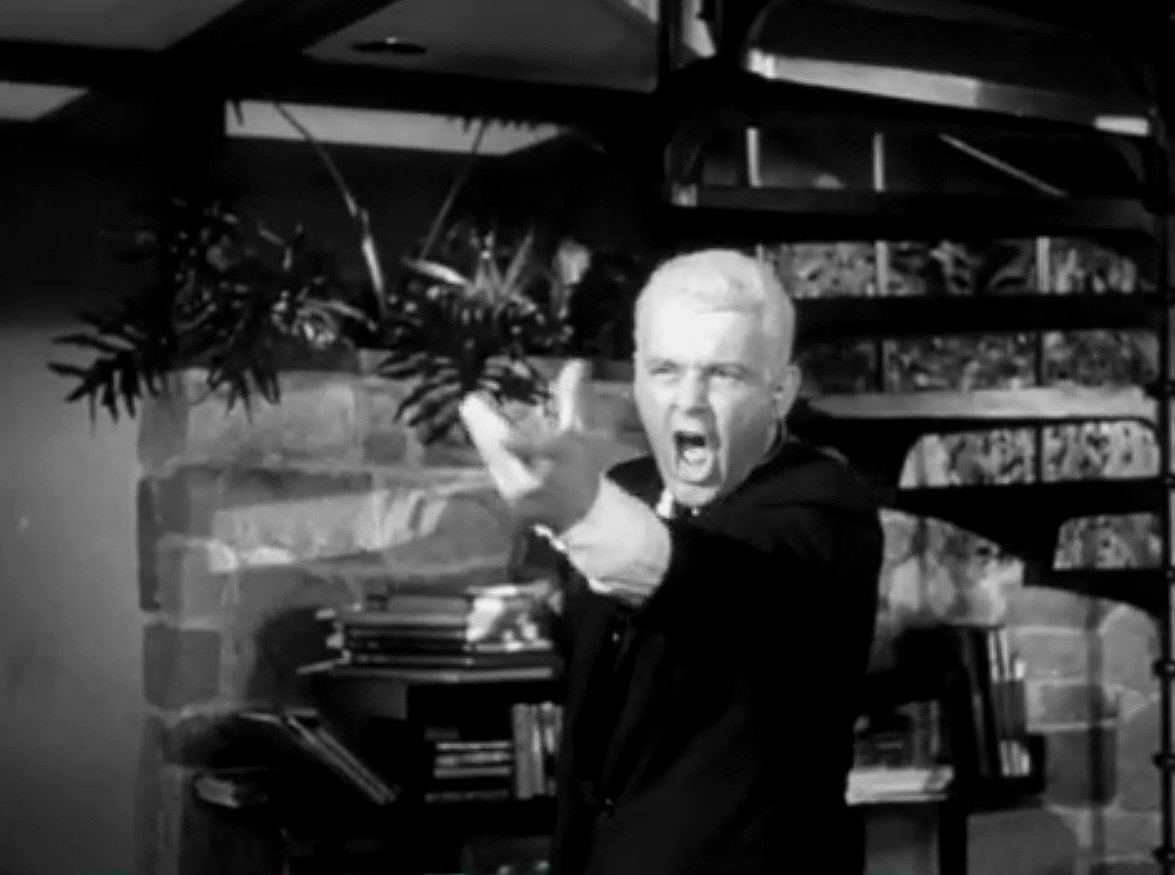
Steiger during a dynamic scene in The Big Knife

Steiger was one of Hollywood's most respected character actors. Hutchinson described him as "one of Hollywood's most charismatic and dynamic stars". Yet for Hutchinson, Steiger remained "out of sympathy with Hollywood" during his career, believing that accomplished actors often struggle to find challenging films as they got older. Steiger was an "effusive talent" according to Lucia Bozzola of The New York Times, and was particularly noted for his intense portrayal of offbeat, often volatile and crazed characters. After On the Waterfront (1954), Steiger became somewhat typecast for playing tough characters and villains, and grew increasingly frustrated playing the "Mafia heavy or a near-psychopath" during the 1970s, roles that he could play menacingly, but provided little opportunity for him to showcase his talent. Gossip columnist Louella Parsons hailed him as "the Screen's No.1 Bad Man", while the newspaper London Evening News referred to him as "the man you would love to hate if you had the courage". A 1960 publication by Dean Jennings of The Saturday Evening Post referred to Steiger as an "angry, hot-tempered newcomer of prodigious acting talents, [who] works best only at emotional white heat", and remarked that he found it "stimulating to carry theatrical fantasy into his private life". Pauline Kael found his performances so powerful that she believed he "often seems to take over a picture even when he isn't in the lead". The journal Films and Filming, surveying his career in 1971, noted that his talent "developed steadily through films good and bad", and that the secret of his success was that he stayed grounded, citing a 1956 interview where he said "I pity the player who can't keep his feet on the ground. It's too easy to trade on success and forget that no performer can stand still."

A product of the Actors Studio, Steiger is closely associated with method acting, embodying the characters he played. Writer James F. Scott notes that during his career, he "many times put aside his own personality to think his way into an alien psyche". Steiger once said:

I don't like the term Method, but for the sake of argument method acting is a means to an end. It is something that helps you get involved in the part personally so that you can communicate with the audience. No matter what, the American actor of the fifties changed acting the world over. Montgomery Clift was perhaps the actor who started it, Brando caused the sensation and [James] Dean made it a cult.

Steiger was so devoted to his craft that during the 1970s he turned to many foreign productions, especially in Italy, to obtain the sort of roles he desired, but often clashed with directors over his method acting techniques. In one of his last interviews, Steiger said: "What is the greatest thing an artist in any profession can give to a person?—that would be a constructive, warm memory. Because that gets into your brain and therefore into your life, so to speak. And that's it, when somebody says to me 'I'll never forget', that's worth more to me than five Academy Awards, I'm in that person's life".

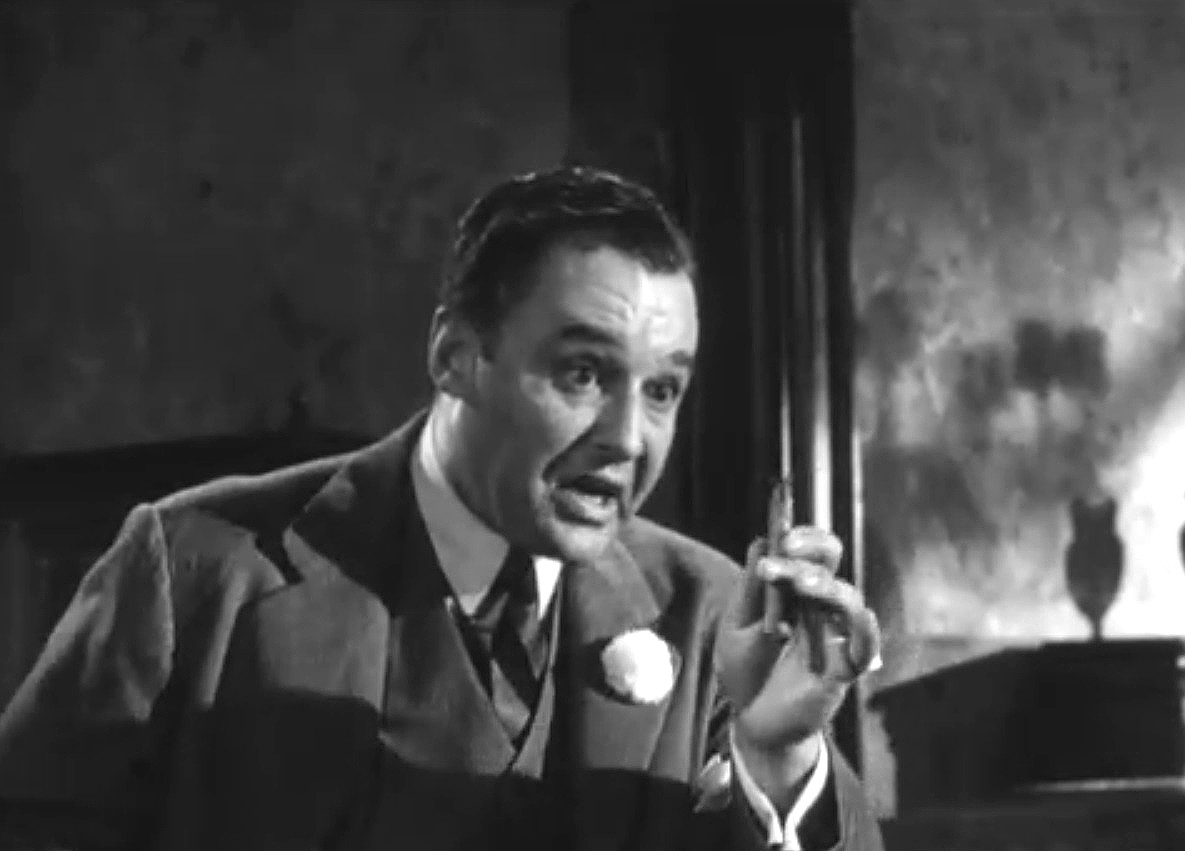
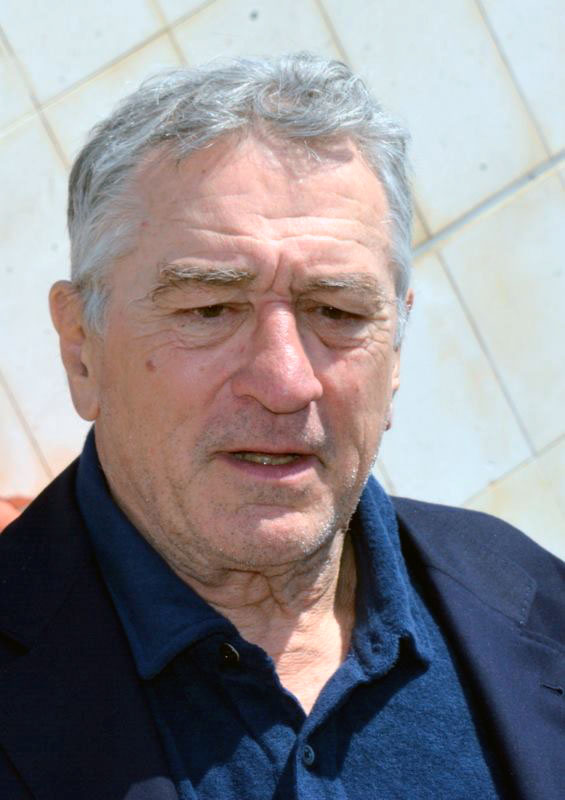
Robert De Niro modeled his performance in The Untouchables (1987) on Steiger's portrayal of Al Capone.

Film writer Paul Simpson notes how closely Steiger prepared for his roles, and how he "effortlessly" recreated the mannerisms of figures such as Mussolini, in a "compelling take on an enigmatic figure". Judith Crist of New York Magazine, reviewing Duck, You Sucker!, commented that Steiger was "totally without mannerisms, always with manner", and noted that his "silences are stunningly effective". Roger Ebert later echoed this statement, concurring that Steiger lacked mannerisms, writing, "When he gets a character worth playing with, he creates it new from the bottom up, out of whole cloth. I don't know how he does it. It's almost as if he gets inside the skin of the guy he's playing and starts being that person for a while". Steiger said: "I always tried to do things different. If I got a role which was similar to another I'd try to do it a little different." His explosive screen performances were an influence on many later actors, including Robert De Niro, who used Steiger's portrayal of Al Capone as a reference for his own performance in The Untouchables (1987). Elvis Presley was highly impressed with Steiger's "powerful and wrenching performance" in The Pawnbroker.

Despite Steiger's acclaim as an actor, he was frequently accused of overacting and won his share of critics, particularly during the 1970s and 1980s. His acting was so dynamic at times that critics found him excessive and overbearing, and even uncomfortable or laughable to watch. Steiger once clashed with Armenian director Rouben Mamoulian, during a theatrical production of Oklahoma!, as he was intolerant of Steiger's "unusual acting technique". Steiger ignored the director's concerns that he was mumbling his lines, and when he began chomping loudly on an apple during a scene with Gordon MacRae, Mamoulian exclaimed: "Get out of my theater. Get out of my life!", and fired him. Even Kazan found several of the Actors Studio's techniques disagreeable, preferring "more humor and verve and less self-indulgence, self-pity and self-awareness". Kazan felt that Steiger often displayed a competitive edge as an actor and tried to steal scenes from his co-stars. Steiger rejected these claims, insisting that he was merely "trying to take the medium of acting to as far as I can go, and that why I sometimes go over the edge".

Several co-stars found working with Steiger difficult; Warren Oates, according to director Norman Jewison, viewed Steiger as "somebody who had a tendency to go over the top" during the making of In The Heat of the Night. Writer Richard Dyer highlights the contrast in the film between the acting styles of Steiger and Poitier, with "Poitier's stillness and implied intensity" and "Steiger's busy, exteriorised method acting". Humphrey Bogart, Steiger's co-star in The Harder They Fall, referred to Steiger's method acting as the "scratch-your-ass-and-mumble school of acting". Director Robert Aldrich notes that Steiger had a habit of changing his lines, which often confused his co-stars. Aldrich stated: "Usually I lie awake at nights trying to think of ways to improve an actor's performance. With Steiger, the problem is to try and contain him". Steiger was particularly aggressive toward director Kenneth Annakin during the making of Across the Bridge, insisting on rewriting most of the script and changing many of the lines to better fit Steiger's idea of the character. Annakin stated that he had "never known an actor to put so much thought and preparation into a performance" as Steiger. Hutchinson revealed that Steiger often suffered from panic during filming and that fear of failure haunted him throughout his life, but fear also provided him with a source of strength in his acting.

== Bibliography ==
- Эфрос, Анатолий; Thomas, James (2006). The Joy of Rehearsal: Reflections on Interpretation and Practice. Peter Lang. ISBN 978-0-8204-6338-4.
- Allon, Yoram; Cullen, Del; Patterson, Hannah (2002). Contemporary North American Film Directors: A Wallflower Critical Guide. Wallflower Press. ISBN 978-1-903364-52-9.
- Anastasia, George; Macnow, Glen (2011). The Ultimate Book of Gangster Movies: Featuring the 100 Greatest Gangster Films of All Time. Running Press. ISBN 978-0-7624-4370-3.
- Benson, Robby (2012). I'm Not Dead... Yet!. Bengal Prods Inc. ISBN 978-0-9831416-5-5.
- Bey, Douglas; Bey, Deborah (2007). Loving an Adult Child of an Alcoholic. Rowman & Littlefield. ISBN 978-1-59077-117-4.
- Bolzoni, Francesco (1986). I film di Francesco Rosi (in Italian). Gremese Editore. ISBN 978-88-7605-241-5.
- Bowker (2000). Bowker's complete video directory: the most extensive listing of currently available entertainment titles as well as education and special interest videos for home, school, and business. Bowker. ISBN 978-0-8352-4308-7.
- Braudy, Leo (2005). On the Waterfront. British Film Institute. ISBN 978-1-84457-072-0.
- Breitbart, Andrew; Ebner, Mark (2004). Hollywood, Interrupted: Insanity Chic in Babylon – The Case Against Celebrity. John Wiley & Sons. ISBN 978-0-471-66189-4.
- Brode, Douglas (1990). The films of the sixties. Carol Publishing Group. ISBN 978-0-8065-0798-9.
- Burt, Daniel S. (2001). The Biography Book: A Reader's Guide to Nonfiction, Fictional, and Film Biographies of More Than 500 of the Most Fascinating Individuals of All Time. Greenwood Publishing Group. ISBN 978-1-57356-256-0.
- Burton, Richard; Williams, Chris (2012). The Richard Burton Diaries. Yale University Press. ISBN 978-0-300-18010-7.
- Chase, James Hadley (1962). The World in my Pocket.
- Compo, Susan A. (2009). Warren Oates: A Wild Life. University Press of Kentucky. ISBN 978-0-8131-3918-0.
- Connelly, Mark (2012). The IRA on Film and Television: A History. McFarland. ISBN 978-0-7864-8961-9.
- Curtis, Edward E. (2010). Encyclopedia of Muslim-American History. Infobase Publishing. ISBN 978-1-4381-3040-8.
- De Vito, John; Tropea, Frank (2010). Epic Television Miniseries: A Critical History. McFarland. ISBN 978-0-7864-4149-5.
- Dyer, Richard (2013). White: Essays on Race and Culture. Routledge. ISBN 978-1-136-14524-7.
- Fantle, David; Johnson, Tom (2009). Twenty Five Years of Celebrity Interviews from Vaudeville to Movies to TV, Reel to Real. Badger Books Inc. ISBN 978-1-932542-04-2.
- Fawell, John (2005). The Art of Sergio Leone's Once Upon a Time in the West: A Critical Appreciation. McFarland. ISBN 978-0-7864-2092-6.
- Ford, Peter (2011). Glenn Ford: A Life. Univ of Wisconsin Press. ISBN 978-0-299-28153-3.
- Fuller, Samuel; Peary, Gerald (2012). Samuel Fuller: Interviews. Univ. Press of Mississippi. ISBN 978-1-61703-306-3.
- Goble, Alan (1999). The Complete Index to Literary Sources in Film. Walter de Gruyter. ISBN 978-3-11-095194-3.
- Grant, Edmond (1998). The Motion Picture Guide, 1998 Annual: The Films of 1997. CineBooks. ISBN 978-0-933997-41-7.
- Greene, Doyle (2010). The American Worker on Film: A Critical History, 1909–1999. McFarland. ISBN 978-0-7864-5776-2.
- Halliwell, Leslie (1996). Halliwell's Film Guide. HarperPerennial. ISBN 978-0-06-273372-6.
- Herman, Jan (1995). A Talent for Trouble: The Life of Hollywood's Most Acclaimed Director, William Wyler. G.P. Putnam's Sons. ISBN 978-0-399-14012-9.
- Hirschhorn, Joel (1983). Rating the movie stars for home video, TV, cable. Beekman House. ISBN 978-0-517-41444-6.
- Hischak, Thomas S. (2009). Broadway Plays and Musicals: Descriptions and Essential Facts of More Than 14,000 Shows through 2007. McFarland. ISBN 978-0-7864-3448-0.
- Hughes, Howard (2011). Cinema Italiano: The Complete Guide from Classics to Cult. I.B.Tauris. ISBN 978-0-85773-044-2.
- Hutchinson, Tom (1998). Rod Steiger: Memoirs of a Friendship. V. Gollancz. ISBN 978-0-575-05903-0.
- Jones, Shirley (2014). Shirley Jones: A Memoir. Simon and Schuster. ISBN 978-1-4767-2596-3.
- Keach, Stacy (2013). All in All: An Actor's Life On and Off the Stage. Rowman & Littlefield. ISBN 978-1-4930-0117-0.
- Kelley, Kitty (1986). His Way: The Unauthorized Biography of Frank Sinatra. Bantam Books Trade Paperbacks. ISBN 978-0-553-38618-9.
- Maltin, Leonard (2014). Leonard Maltin's 2015 Movie Guide. Penguin Publishing Group. ISBN 978-0-698-18361-2.
- McCaffrey, Donald W. (1992). Assault on Society: Satirical Literature to Film. Scarecrow Press. ISBN 978-0-8108-2507-9.
- Mell, Eila (2005). Casting Might-Have-Beens: A Film by Film Directory of Actors Considered for Roles Given to Others. McFarland. ISBN 978-0-7864-2017-9.
- Millner, Cork (1994). Portraits. Fithian Press. ISBN 978-1-56474-087-8.
- Pontuso, James F. (2005). Political Philosophy Comes to Rick's: Casablanca and American Civic Culture. Lexington Books. ISBN 978-0-7391-1113-0.
- Palmer, Bill; Palmer, Karen; Meyers, Ric (1995). The Encyclopedia of Martial Arts Movies. Scarecrow Press. ISBN 978-1-4616-7275-3.
- Parish, James Robert; Marill, Alvin H. (1972). The Cinema of Edward G. Robinson. A. S. Barnes. ISBN 978-0-498-07875-0.
- Phillips, Gene D. (2006). Beyond the Epic: The Life and Films of David Lean. University Press of Kentucky. ISBN 978-0-8131-2415-5.
- Ray, Fred Olen (1991). The New Poverty Row: Independent Filmmakers as Distributors. McFarland. ISBN 978-0-89950-628-9.
- Rees, Dafydd; Crampton, Luke (1999). Rock Stars Encyclopedia. DK Pub. ISBN 978-0-7894-4613-8.
- Robe, Lucy Barry (1986). Co-starring famous women and alcohol. CompCare Publications. ISBN 978-0-89638-100-1.
- Rollins, Peter C. (2015). Hollywood As Historian: American Film in a Cultural Context. University Press of Kentucky. ISBN 978-0-8131-4864-9.
- Schilling, Jerry; Crisafulli, Chuck (2006). Me and a Guy Named Elvis: My Lifelong Friendship with Elvis Presley. Penguin Publishing Group. ISBN 978-1-101-21681-1.
- Scialò, P. (2002). La sceneggiata. Rappresentazioni di un genere popolare. Guida Editori. ISBN 978-88-7188-689-3.
- Scott, James F. (1975). Film, the medium and the maker. Holt, Rinehart and Winston. ISBN 978-0-03-079445-2.
- Shipman, David (1980). The Great Movie Stars: The International Years. Angus and Robertson. ISBN 978-0-207-95858-8.
- Simpson, Paul (2011). Movie Lists: 397 Ways to Pick a DVD. Profile Books. ISBN 978-1-84765-355-0.
- Stempel, Tom (1996). Storytellers to the Nation: A History of American Television Writing. Syracuse University Press. ISBN 978-0-8156-0368-9.
- Talbott, Strobe (2009). The Great Experiment: The Story of Ancient Empires, Modern States, and the Quest for a Global Nation. Simon and Schuster. ISBN 978-0-7432-9409-6.
- Terrace, Vincent (2008). Encyclopedia of Television Shows, 1925 through 2010, 2d ed. McFarland. ISBN 978-0-7864-8641-0.
- Thompson, John Herd; Randall, Stephen J. (2010). Canada and the United States: Ambivalent Allies. University of Georgia Press. ISBN 978-0-8203-3725-8.
- Wilson, John (2005). The Official Razzie Movie Guide: Enjoying the Best of Hollywood's Worst. Grand Central Publishing. ISBN 0-446-69334-0.
- Wise, James E.; Rehill, Anne Collier (1999). Stars in the Corps: Movie Actors in the United States Marines. Naval Institute Press. ISBN 978-1-55750-949-9.
- Wise, James E.; Rehill, Anne Collier (2007). Stars in Blue: Movie Actors in America's Sea Services. Naval Institute Press. ISBN 978-1-59114-944-6.
- Wojcik, Pamela Robertson (2004). Movie Acting, the Film Reader. Psychology Press. ISBN 978-0-415-31025-3.
- Zimmerman, Steve (2009). Food in the Movies (2d ed.). McFarland. ISBN 978-0-7864-5569-0.
