= Wood Knapp Video =

VHS distributor

Wood Knapp & Co.
- Industry: Home entertainment
- Founded: 1988; 38 years ago
- Defunct: 1995; 31 years ago
- Fate: Bankruptcy
- Headquarters: Los Angeles, California
- Products: VHS

Wood Knapp & Co., commonly called Wood Knapp Video or simply Wood Knapp, was a VHS distributor founded in 1988 by Betsy Wood Knapp. It distributed the Children's Circle releases from Weston Woods Studios, obscure United Artists releases, the 1988 Summer Olympics, classic teleplays such as Marty and Requiem for a Heavyweight, among others. Wood Knapp Video declared bankruptcy in January 1995, and ceased operations on December 31, 1995.

== International Video Logos ==
- (UK) - Pickwick Video - 1989-1991
- (UK) - The Video Collection - 1991-1995
- (Germany) - Taurus Home Video - 1990-1995
- (Spain) - Filmax Grupo Ivex - 1991-1993
- (Italy) - Multivision Video - 1990-1993
