= Gulf Playhouse =

- Genre: Dramatic anthology
- Country of origin: United States
- Original language: English
- No. of seasons: 1

Original release
- Network: NBC
- Release: October 3, 1952 – September 11, 1953

Gulf Playhouse, also known as Gulf Playhouse: 1st Person and First Person Playhouse, is an American anthology series that aired on Friday nights from 1952 to 1953 on NBC. Originally a standard live dramatic anthology series, it was later redeveloped as a summer replacement series whose anthology stories were now told as seen through the "eye" of the camera. The actors in each episode would talk to the camera as if it were a person, animal or object.

Gulf Playhouse debuted on October 3, 1952, replacing We the People. It initially ran on NBC opposite My Friend Irma. When it was canceled, Gulf replaced it with The Life of Riley. The revised version, Gulf Playhouse: 1st Person, was the summer replacement for Riley in 1953.

The series ran for twenty-four episodes with stars that included Rod Steiger, Tony Randall, Kim Stanley, Eddie Bracken, Ward Bond, Wendell Corey, Felicia Montealegre Bernstein, and Kim Hunter. The show's sponsor was Gulf Oil, and it was produced and directed by Frank Telford. Among its other directors was Arthur Penn. and Wes McKee. Bill Hoffman edited the scripts. Many of the writers were relatively unknown at the time. They included Carey Wilber, Frank D. Gilroy, Abby Mann, and Norman Lessing.

== Episodes ==
Selected Episodes of Gulf Playhouse
| Date | Title | Actor(s) |
|---|---|---|
| October 3, 1952 | "Double By-Line" | Dennis O'Keefe, Nina Foch |
| October 10, 1952 | "Squawks Mcgrew" | Ward Bond, Karl Lukas, and Arthur O'Connell. |
| October 17, 1952 | "The Rose" | Gene Lockhart, Mildred Dunnock, Jonathan Marlowe, Conrad Janis, Joseph Buloff, Alan Hewitt, Betty Lynn, Margaret Hamilton, Eddie Bruce |
| October 24, 1952 | "Necktie Party" | Jack Palance, John Howard, James Westerfield, Biff McGuire, Bernard Kates, Don Briggs, Bill Erwin, August Merighi |
| October 31, 1952 | "Mr. Nothing" | Thomas Mitchell, Everett Sloane, Kevin McCarthy Dorothy Peterson, Sorrel Booke |
| November 7, 1952 | "A Question Of Rank" | Eddie Bracken, Hanley Stafford, Beverly Whitnehy, George Mathews, Winston Ross |
| November 14, 1952 | "The Duel" | Wendell Corey, Fred Worlock, Fred Stewart, Henry Jones, Ellen Demming |
| November 21, 1952 | "The Whale on the Beach" | Hoagy Carmichael |
| July 14, 1953 | "The Tears of My Sister" | Angela Adamides, Catharine Doucet, Frank Overton |
| July 31, 1953 | "One Night Stand" | James Dunn, Conrad Janis |
| August 21, 1953 | "Crip" | Evelyn Varden, Leo Penn |
| September 4, 1953 | "Prophet in His Land" | Buster Crabbe, Tony Randall |
| September 11, 1953 | "A Gift from Cotton Mather" | Joseph Anthony, Mildred Dunnock, Kim Hunter |
