= Cecil Wilson (journalist) =

Cecil Frank Petch Wilson (10 September 1909 in Margate, Kent – 17 March 1997 in Seaford, East Sussex) was an English journalist, who was a drama and film critic for The Daily Mail from 1938 to 1990. Adam Benedick of The Independent wrote in Wilson's obituary in 1997: "Although he must have had a wider readership on the Daily Mail from 1938 to 1990 than most of his Fleet Street contemporaries, Wilson never went about as if he knew it. He knew that criticism must be personal, yet saw no reason to introduce himself into his writing more than was necessary. Yet this unassertive, bespectacled man, whose only concession to sartorial effect was a bow tie, survived the up and downs of front-line Fleet Street journalism for over half a century on one paper."
