= Marty (The Philco Television Playhouse) =

- The Philco Television Playhouse episode
- Nancy Marchand and Rod Steiger
- Episode no.: Season 5 Episode 23
- Directed by: Delbert Mann
- Teleplay by: Paddy Chayefsky
- Cinematography by: Al McClellan
- Original air date: May 24, 1953
- Running time: 51 minutes

Guest appearances
- Rod Steiger as Marty Pilletti; Nancy Marchand as Clara; Esther Minciotti as Mrs. Pilletti, Marty's Mother; Joe Mantell as Angie; Augusta Ciolli as Aunt Catherine; Betsy Palmer as Virginia; Lee Philips as Tommy; Rosanna San Marco as Woman; Howard Caine as Bartender; Nehemiah Persoff as Critic; Don Gordon as Young Man; Andrew Gerardo as Patsy; George Maharis as Dancer at the Dance Club

Episode chronology
← Previous "A Little Something in Reserve"	Next → "The Way of the Eagle"

"Marty" is a 1953 television play by Paddy Chayefsky. It was telecast live May 24, 1953, on The Philco Television Playhouse with Rod Steiger in the title role and Nancy Marchand, in her television debut, playing opposite him as Clara. Chayefsky's story of a decent, hard-working Bronx butcher, pining for the company of a woman in his life but despairing of ever finding true love in a relationship, was produced by Fred Coe with associate producer Gordon Duff.

The teleplay was adapted into the feature film Marty starring Ernest Borgnine in 1955. It was directed by Delbert Mann and written by Chayefsky.

== Development ==
In his collected Television Plays (1955), Chayefsky recalled:

I set out in Marty to write a love story, the most ordinary love story in the world. I didn't want my hero to be handsome, and I didn't want the girl to be pretty. I wanted to write a love story the way it would literally have happened to the kind of people I know... The actor who played Marty, Rod Steiger, is one of the most gifted young actors in the theater, and I owe him a genuine debt of gratitude for all that he contributed to this show.

The story originated by chance when Delbert Mann and Chayefsky were rehearsing The Reluctant Citizen in the old Abbey Hotel's ballroom on West 51st Street, which was also used for Friday night meetings of the Friendship Club. After Chayefsky wandered around and spotted a sign which read, "Girls, Dance With the Man Who Asks You. Remember, Men Have Feelings, Too", he told Mann he thought there was a play possibility about a young woman in that type of setting. Speaking to Mann later that day, he told him that such a drama could work better with a man as the central character rather than a woman. Mann told him to go talk to Fred Coe, which Chayefsky did. He pitched the idea by simply saying, "I want to do a play about a guy who goes to a ballroom." Coe told him to start writing it.

As Chayefsky was in the middle of writing the script (at this point entitled "Love Story"), Coe and Mann unexpectedly rejected another script that was scheduled for production. Coe then called Chayefsky to ask him how the "Love Story" script was going, hoping that it could be put into production immediately. At that point, Chayefsky was partway through act 2, and thought he could have it finished in a few weeks, but after talking with Coe he agreed to turn around material in only a few days.

The piece was cast and rehearsals got underway with only acts 1 & 2 having been delivered. Chayefsky delivered Act 3 one day later than expected, but still in time to give the cast and crew several days of rehearsal with the complete teleplay.

Chayefsky's original title "Love Story" was deemed unacceptable by NBC, who requested the title be changed. Chayefsky's alternative title of "Marty" was used instead.

== Reception ==
Tony Schwartz reviewed the television production in The New York Times:

It's the stark, simple portrait of a gentle, lonely man, played by Rod Steiger, who lives with his mother, works as a butcher and longs for a loving relationship as he heads toward middle age. "I'm 36 years old and I've been lookin' for a girl every Saturday night of my life," he tells his best friend. "I'm a fat little ugly guy and girls don't go for me, that's all." It's just that sort of unfettered sentiment that gives the drama such powerful resonance. The story centers mostly on a single Saturday night in Marty's life. After despairing about how to spend it, and then suffering another humiliating rejection when he calls a girl to ask her out, Marty finally decides to attend a lonely hearts social at the Waverly Ballroom. There he meets a girl (Nancy Marchand) who has just been ditched by her blind date—a slick fellow who offers Marty "five bucks if you take this dog home for me". Marty approaches her, and in their mutual misery they find a bond. She rejects his first fumbling attempt to kiss her, but mostly in an effort not to seem overeager. Even in the afterglow of a wonderful evening, Marty is subjected the next day to ridicule from his friends, who insist that the girl is a homely loser not worth pursuing. The story hinges on whether he'll follow their advice or follow his own instincts to see her again. The drama is most convincing when it sticks with Marty—and much less so when it drifts off into a stilted subplot about his mother's attempts to convince a sister to move into their household. Because the whole play is less than an hour long (a subsequent film version of the play ran 90 minutes), the second story simply gets in the way.

The acclaimed television drama was honored a decade later when the kinescope of the production was selected for showing at the Museum of Modern Art on February 17–20, 1963, as part of Television USA: Thirteen Seasons, described by MoMA Film Library curator Richard Griffith as "a grand retrospective of the best that has been done in American television."

It was released on VHS by Wood Knapp Video.

The original 1953 telecast is commercially available as part of a three-DVD set, "The Golden Age of Television" (Criterion Collection), a series which aired on PBS in 1981 with Eva Marie Saint as the host of Marty. It features interviews with Steiger, Marchand and Mann.

Only Esther Minciotti, Augusta Ciolli and Joe Mantell repeated their 1953 TV drama roles in the 1955 film adaptation.

== See also ==
- Wisconsin Center for Film and Theater Research
