= The Glory Boys =

- Written by: Gerald Seymour
- Directed by: Michael Ferguson
- Starring: Rod Steiger; Anthony Perkins; Alfred Burke; Joanna Lumley
- Music by: Alan Parker
- Country of origin: United Kingdom
- Original language: English
- No. of series: 1
- No. of episodes: 3

Production
- Executive producers: Alan Landsburg; David Cunliffe
- Producer: Michael Glynn
- Cinematography: Alan Pyrah
- Editor: Elizabeth Kling
- Running time: 52 minutes
- Production company: Yorkshire Television

Original release
- Network: ITV
- Release: 1 October – 3 October 1984

The Glory Boys is a 1984 British three-part television thriller miniseries made for Yorkshire Television and first broadcast on the ITV network between 1 and 3 October 1984, starring Rod Steiger and Anthony Perkins. Two terrorists, one from the IRA and another from the PLO, converge in London to assassinate an Israeli nuclear scientist.

== Cast ==
- Rod Steiger as Professor David Sokarev
- Anthony Perkins as Jimmy
- Alfred Burke as Jones
- Joanna Lumley as Helen
- Sallyanne Law as Norah
- Aaron Harris as Cillian McCoy
- Gary Brown as Famy

== Production ==
Steiger and Perkins were at loggerheads during the production of The Glory Boys. Perkins resented the fact that Steiger insisted on a bigger trailer and felt that Steiger was trying to steal scenes from him, while Steiger had thought Perkins "so jittery and jinxed by the chemicals he was taking" that he felt sorry for him and believed that he was jeopardizing the success of the film.
