= 3 into 2 Won't Go =

1969 British film by Peter Hall

- American theatrical release poster
- Directed by: Peter Hall
- Written by: Andrea Newman; Edna O'Brien
- Produced by: Julian Blaustein
- Starring: Rod Steiger; Claire Bloom; Judy Geeson
- Cinematography: Walter Lassally
- Edited by: Alan Osbiston
- Music by: Francis Lai
- Production company: Julian Blaustein Productions
- Distributed by: The Rank Organisation; Universal Pictures (US)
- Release date: 2 July 1969
- Running time: 92 minutes
- Country: United Kingdom
- Language: English
- Budget: $1.5 million

3 into 2 Won't Go (a.k.a. Three into Two Won't Go) is a 1969 British drama film directed by Peter Hall, and starring Rod Steiger, Claire Bloom, and Judy Geeson. It premiered at the 19th Berlin International Film Festival.

== Plot ==
Steve and Frances Howard are a middle-aged married couple unable to have children. They have discussed adoption but have made no decision: the subject is clearly difficult for them. They have purchased a large detached house on a newly built luxury estate in Middlesex, England, and are starting to furnish and decorate it. Also to attend to the extensive, but empty, garden. Frances teaches English to GCE A-level students, while Steve is a sales executive in an electrical appliance company, enjoying the regular driving his job entails.

One day, Steve picks up a free-spirited teenage hitchhiker, Ella, and they have a brief affair. To Steve's considerable shock and surprise Ella turns up at his home whilst he is away and introduces herself to Frances. After they become acquainted over several bottles of wine, she claims to be pregnant by another man, then begs to be allowed to stay for the weekend. Calculating and manipulative, when Steve returns and Frances is away Ella threatens to abort the baby, which she reveals is his. He begs her not to, but she refuses. Torn between his faltering love for his wife, his infatuation with Ella, and his unborn child, Steve finally agrees to leave his wife and set up home with Ella to have the baby together. Ella agrees, though without much enthusiasm, but specifies he should tell his wife when she (Ella) is not present.

Frances clearly suspects a secret relationship; her situation is further complicated by visits to her elderly mother Belle, an emotionally repressed women who reveals the philandering nature of Frances' father. And how she endured their lifetime of marriage, and his habit of bringing lady 'friends' to their home, by shutting her mind to it. Frances discloses somebody her husband met, a young girl, is now staying with them. Resignedly, her mother tells her 'You'll learn to live with it'.

Steve meets Frances to tell her of his decision, but before he can she - knowing what he is about to say, and telling him not to - says she wants to adopt Ella's unborn baby. This is a surprise opportunity - for Steve to save his marriage and have a child; likewise for Frances. But he rejects the offer and says he is leaving to live with Ella. "You bloody fool" she says, softly, as she leaves him. Frances fetches her mother to come and live in the house with her. Steve has arranged to meet Ella that evening, but she doesn't turn up. Returning to the house with her mother Frances finds Ella there. After shepherding the mother away, Ella tells Frances she is not now pregnant. Steve arrives, unaware of this latest development, and Ella tells him she has changed her mind. After tense exchanges Steve agrees to seek a divorce. Frances leaves with her mother to find a hotel. Steve packs a suitcase and leaves too. Ella is now seemingly in possession of the house, having in the meantime destroyed a marriage. She picks up her rucksack and coat, and leaves the house herself.

== Cast ==
- Rod Steiger as Steve Howard
- Claire Bloom as Frances Howard
- Judy Geeson as Ella Patterson
- Peggy Ashcroft as Belle
- Paul Rogers as Jack Roberts
- Lynn Farleigh as Janet
- Elizabeth Spriggs as Marcia
- Sheila Allen as Beth

== Production ==
The film was shot entirely on location in and around Camberley, England.

== Reception ==
=== Critical ===
The Monthly Film Bulletin wrote: "Three into Two Won't Go is a slight improvement on Work is a Four Letter Word (it could hardly be otherwise), but Peter Hall still has a long way to go if he is to be reckoned as a director who can give some overall consistency of style to his material instead of playing it by ear as he goes along. Here he has several things working in his favour: some sharp dialogue from Edna O'Brien (in between a number of those irritatingly ostentatious blows for the cause of the vulnerable woman which pepper her novels); a marvellously tetchy performance from Peggy Ashcroft as the slightly unhinged mother-in-law confined to an old people's home in which both her fellow inmates and the food ("It's the gravy they give us") are clearly not what she is accustomed to; and Claire Bloom almost managing to suggest that the character she plays is actually a real person as she responds to the camera's probing exploration of her face with commendable restraint. This, unfortunately, is about all that can be said for the film, which is almost entirely composed of scenes clumsily set up to get the right audience reaction ... It's a pretty silly story to begin with, but the fact that everyone seems to be taking it so seriously only makes it seem sillier. When Peggy Ashcroft diffidently inquires of the final drawingroom mélée 'Isn't this a little boisterous?', one knows exactly what she means."

=== Box office ===
The film was the 19th most popular film at the UK box office in 1969.

== U.S. Network Television Broadcast ==
In 1970, a dramatically edited version of the film was broadcast on NBC in the United States, with around 20 minutes of alternate footage newly shot and added, as was common practice for Universal with TV versions of its films at the time. Hall, O'Brien and Newman subsequently demanded their credits removed from this version.

== Home media ==
Kino Lorber issued the film on Blu-ray on 22 August 2023, marking its worldwide home video debut; both the theatrical and TV versions are included on this release.
