= Ridgewood, Illinois =

- Unincorporated community Census designated place
- Location within Illinois Location within the United States
- Coordinates: 41°32′5″N 88°2′23″W
- Country: United States
- State: Illinois
- County: Will
- Township: Joliet

Area
  - Total: 0.45 sq mi (1.16 km^{2})
  - Land: 0.45 sq mi (1.16 km^{2})
  - Water: 0 sq mi (0.00 km^{2})
- Elevation: 665 ft (203 m)

Population (2020)
  - Total: 2,956
  - Density: 6,591.2/sq mi (2,544.89/km^{2})
- Time zone: UTC-6 (Central (CST))
  - Summer (DST): UTC-5 (CDT)
- ZIP Code: 60432 (Joliet)
- Area codes: 815, 779
- FIPS code: 17-64005
- GNIS feature ID: 2806552

Ridgewood is an unincorporated community and census-designated place (CDP) in Will County, Illinois, United States. It is northwest of the center of the county, bordered to the east and west by the city of Joliet. U.S. Route 30 runs along the southern edge of the CDP, leading west 2 miles (3 km) to the center of Joliet and east 3 miles (5 km) to Interstate 80.

As of the 2020 census, Ridgewood had a population of 2,956.

Ridgewood was first listed as a CDP prior to the 2020 census.

Pace provides bus service on Route 508 connecting Ridgewood to downtown Joliet and other destinations.

== Demographics ==
Historical population
Census	Pop.	Note	%±
2020	2,956		—
U.S. Decennial Census

Ridgewood first appeared as a census designated place in the 2020 U.S. Census.

=== 2020 census ===
As of the 2020 census, Ridgewood had a population of 2,956. The median age was 32.3 years. 30.2% of residents were under the age of 18 and 9.7% of residents were 65 years of age or older. For every 100 females there were 106.4 males, and for every 100 females age 18 and over there were 107.6 males age 18 and over.

100.0% of residents lived in urban areas, while 0.0% lived in rural areas.

There were 884 households in Ridgewood, of which 42.6% had children under the age of 18 living in them. Of all households, 49.2% were married-couple households, 19.3% were households with a male householder and no spouse or partner present, and 24.5% were households with a female householder and no spouse or partner present. About 18.5% of all households were made up of individuals and 5.7% had someone living alone who was 65 years of age or older.

There were 962 housing units, of which 8.1% were vacant. The homeowner vacancy rate was 2.3% and the rental vacancy rate was 3.7%.

Ridgewood CDP, Illinois – Racial and ethnic composition Note: the US Census treats Hispanic/Latino as an ethnic category. This table excludes Latinos from the racial categories and assigns them to a separate category. Hispanics/Latinos may be of any race.
Race / Ethnicity (NH = Non-Hispanic)	Pop 2020	% 2020
White alone (NH)	591	19.99%
Black or African American alone (NH)	225	7.61%
Native American or Alaska Native alone (NH)	6	0.20%
Asian alone (NH)	10	0.34%
Pacific Islander alone (NH)	0	0.00%
Some Other Race alone (NH)	6	0.20%
Mixed Race or Multi-Racial (NH)	40	1.35%
Hispanic or Latino (any race)	2,078	70.30%
Total	2,956	100.00%

== Education ==
It is in the Joliet Public School District 86 and the Joliet Township High School District 204.

The majority of areas are zoned to Joliet Central High School. A few areas (north of Cleveland Avenue) are zoned to Joliet West High School.
