= Lawrence M. Walsh Jr. =

American politician

Larry Walsh

Member of the Illinois House of Representatives from the 86th district
- Incumbent
- Assumed office April 2012
- Preceded by: Jack McGuire

Personal details
- Party: Democratic
- Profession: I.A.M. Machinist

Larry Walsh is a Democratic member of the Illinois House of Representatives from the 86th district. The 86th district includes all or parts of Channahon, Elwood, Joliet, Ingalls Park, Preston Heights and Rockdale. Walsh was appointed to the Illinois House on April 30, 2012, after the resignation of Jack McGuire.

As of July 3, 2022, Representative Walsh is a member of the following Illinois House committees:

- Counties & Townships Committee (HCOT)
- Energy & Environment Committee (HENG)
- Health Care Licenses Committee (HHCL)
- Police & Fire Committee (SHPF)
- Prescription Drug Affordability Committee (HPDA)
- (Chairman of) Public Utilities Committee (HPUB)
- (Chairman of) Small Cell Subcommittee (HPUB-SCEL)
- (Chairman of) Telecom/Video Subcommittee (HPUB-TVID)
