= Joliet Township, Illinois =

Coordinates: 41°30′35″N 88°04′54″W

Joliet Township
- Township
- Location in Will County
- Country: United States
- State: Illinois
- County: Will
- Established: November 6, 1849

Area
  - Total: 36.09 sq mi (93.5 km^{2})
  - Land: 35.25 sq mi (91.3 km^{2})
  - Water: 0.84 sq mi (2.2 km^{2}) 2.33%

Population (2010)
  - Estimate (2016): 87,424
  - Density: 2,479.5/sq mi (957.3/km^{2})
- Time zone: UTC-6 (CST)
  - Summer (DST): UTC-5 (CDT)
- FIPS code: 17-197-38583
- Website: www.joliettownship.net

Joliet Township is located in Will County, Illinois. As of the 2010 census, its population was 87,398 and it contained 32,617 housing units.

== Geography ==
According to the 2010 census, the township has a total area of 36.09 square miles (93.5 km^{2}), of which 35.25 square miles (91.3 km^{2}) (or 97.67%) is land and 0.84 square miles (2.2 km^{2}) (or 2.33%) is water.

The segment containing Chicagoland Speedway was ceded to Jackson Township at an unknown date after 1999 for unknown reasons.

=== Cities, Towns, Villages ===
- Crest Hill (small portion)
- Elwood (small portion)
- Joliet (mostly)
- New Lenox (small portion)
- Rockdale

=== Other Communities ===
- Ingalls Park
- Preston Heights
- Ridgewood

== Demographics ==
Historical population
Census	Pop.	Note	%±
2016 (est.)	87,424
U.S. Decennial Census
