= Benjamin McKinley =

Benjamin McKinley may refer to:

- Ben McKinley, Australian rules footballer
- Benjamin McKinley, character in Alice Upside Down and Alice series
