= Joliet Public Schools District 86 =

School district in Illinois, United States

Address
- 420 North Raynor Avenue Joliet, Illinois, 60435; United States

District information
- Type: Public
- Grades: PreK–8
- Superintendent: Dr. Theresa Rouse, Ed.D.
- NCES District ID: 1720580

Students and staff
- Students: 10,299

Other information
- Website: www.joliet86.org

Joliet Public Schools District 86 is an elementary and middle school district headquartered in Joliet, Illinois.

The district includes central portions of Joliet, as well as Ingalls Park and Ridgewood and portions of Preston Heights and Rockdale.

In 2009, almost 63% of the district's students were classified as low income, compared to 23.4% of Will County students overall.

The district feeds into Joliet Township High School District 204.

== Schools ==
Exterior of Hufford Junior High School (May 2026)

Junior high schools:

- Dirksen
- Gompers
- Hufford
- Washington

Elementary schools:

- Culbertson
- Cunningham
- Craughwell
- Eisenhower
- Farragut
- Forest Park
- Jefferson
- Keith
- Marshall (Closed as of June 2026)
- Pershing
- Sanchez
- Sandburg
- Singleton
- Taft
- Thigpen
- Woodland

Early Childhood Centers:

- Marycrest

Alternate School:

- Thompson

== Facilities Referendum ==
On April 4, 2023, Joliet voters considered a proposition authorizing District 86 to issue up to $99.5 milions in bonds for school construction and facility improvements. The proposition covered repairs and upgrades to existing buildings, replacement of the Gompers and Hufford Junior Highs, an addition to Thomas Jefferson Elementary, and site improvements.
