= List of killings by law enforcement officers in the United States, November 2021 =

This is a list of people reported killed by non-military law enforcement officers in the United States in November 2021, whether in the line of duty or not, and regardless of reason or method. The listing documents the occurrence of a death, making no implications regarding wrongdoing or justification on the part of the person killed or officer involved. Killings are arranged by date of the incident that caused death. Different death dates, if known, are noted in the description. The table below lists 91 people.

== November 2021 ==
Date	Name (age) of deceased	Race	Location	Description
2021-11-30	Arthur Allen Gilliam (35)	Unknown race	Rex, GA	
2021-11-30	Benjamin Petry (34)	White	Rushville, Indiana	Petry went to the residence of Ivan Wade Flowers and shot and killed him at his front door. The next day Rushville police spotted a vehicle that matched his description on a Speedway gas station. Petry walked out of the gas station and the officers attempted to speak with him. Petry did not follow orders and drew a handgun on the officers. The police officers then shot and killed Petry.
2021-11-30	Jabari Musgrove (43)	Black	Laurel, MS	
2021-11-29	Richard Lee Richards (61)	White	Tucson, Arizona	Richards was accused of stealing a toolbox from a Walmart and brandished a knife. An officer fatally shot Richards, who used a wheelchair, from behind as he entered another store. The officer fired nine shots and was fired for the shooting. In 2022 the officer was indicted for manslaughter.
2021-11-28	Adam McKnight (33)	Unknown race	Winston-Salem, NC	
2021-11-28	Bradley George Erickson (47)	White	Forest Lake, MN	
2021-11-28	Digno Ramon Yorro ()	Hispanic	Glen Burnie, MD	
2021-11-28	Dylan Bush (33)	White	Culver, IN	
2021-11-28	Jeffrey W. Groulx (47)	White	Seekonk, MA	
2021-11-28	Name Withheld (41)	White	Orem, UT	
2021-11-28	Name Withheld (61)	Unknown race	Lakeland, FL	
2021-11-28	Nivaldo Echevarria ()	Unknown race	Coral Gables, FL	
2021-11-28	Noah Douglas Kelley (21)	White	Mounds View, MN	
2021-11-27	Anthony Oliver (54)	Black	Kalamazoo, MI	
2021-11-27	Juan Carlos Martinez (40)	Hispanic	Miami, FL	
2021-11-26	Christean "Christy" Ann Dimas (28)	Hispanic	Clines Corners, NM	
2021-11-26	Elijah Richie (18)	White	North Valley, NM	
2021-11-26	Shawn Alan Smith (52)	White	Roanoke, VA	
2021-11-26	Travers Spargo King (36)	White	San Diego, CA	
2021-11-24	German Pedraza (27)	Hispanic	Lincoln, NE	
2021-11-24	Travers Spargo King (36)	White	San Diego, California	Travers Spargo King allegedly tried to drive into the Marine Corps training facility near Lindbergh Field without permission shortly before noon Nov. 26, according to MCRD public affairs. After ignoring repeated orders to halt, King allegedly got out of his vehicle and belligerently approached depot personnel with a knife in his hand, prompting them to open fire on him, USMC officials reported. He died at the scene. It's unknown whatever the military police or civilian DoD police were shot him.
2021-11-23	Devin Edward Hall (24)	Black	Pasadena, CA	
2021-11-22	Anthony Harden (30)	Black	Fall River, MA	
2021-11-22	Frank Nappa Jr. (49)	White	Warwick, RI	
2021-11-22	Joseph Burciaga ()	Unknown race	West Covina, CA	
2021-11-22	Lionel Womack (36)	Black	Kansas City, Kansas	Womack, a former Kansas City, Kansas Police detective, was shot and killed after a confrontation with two officers. Police say Womack disarmed one of the officers and pointed the gun at them before being shot by the other officer. Womack had previously filed a lawsuit against the Kiowa County Sheriff's Office alleging that a deputy had intentionally run him over.
2021-11-22	Rodolpho Antonio Ruiz (22)	Hispanic	Merced, CA	
2021-11-21	John Anthony Holenbeck (28)	Hispanic	Willowbrook, CA	Holenbeck had allegedly shot and killed David Koliba on a train platform. Holenbeck was then killed by deputies after they said he pointed a gun at them.
2021-11-21	Jabari Farafiai Asante-Chioke (52)	Black	Metairie, LA	
2021-11-21	Kevin Arbogast (45)	White	Centerville, IA	
2021-11-20	Name Withheld (24)	Unknown race	Oakland, CA	
2021-11-19	Ajmal Amani (41)	Asian	San Francisco, CA	
2021-11-19	Christopher Wade (45)	White	Montcalm, WV	
2021-11-19	Joseph Thomas Lee Lopez (29)	Hispanic	Greensboro, NC	
2021-11-18	Chucky Nathaniel Bowden (53)	Black	Bessemer City, NC	
2021-11-18	Jordon Pas (40)	Hispanic	Santa Rosa, CA	
2021-11-17	Bennie D. Foster (55)	White	Poplar Bluff, MO	
2021-11-17	Brian Jessee (39)	White	LaGrange, GA	
2021-11-17	Kevin Mark Soles (37)	White	Byron, GA	
2021-11-17	Rhonda Jean Russell (47)	White	Altoona, Pennsylvania	Russell, a corrections officer, was transporting an inmate at a courthouse when a struggle occurred and the inmate took Russell's weapon. A nearby police officer shot at the inmate, who lifted Russell into the line of fire. The inmate was charged with murder of the second degree and murder of a law enforcement officer of the second degree.
2021-11-17	Steven Thomas (36)	Black	Las Vegas, NV	
2021-11-17	Sylvester Tart (61)	Black	Waynesboro, MS	
2021-11-16	Brent Lee Boggess (42)	White	Waterloo, IA	
2021-11-16	Cody Rebischke (33)	Unknown race	North Bend, WA	
2021-11-16	Henry Timberlake Duncan (43)	Unknown race	Wilmington, NC	
2021-11-16	Name Withheld (92)	Unknown race	Caldwell, ID	
2021-11-15	Micah D. Brillhart (33)	Unknown race	Orange Springs, FL	
2021-11-15	Name Withheld ()	Unknown race	Pueblo, CO	
2021-11-14	Christopher Walls (16)	Black	Miami, FL	
2021-11-14	Marcus Mann (42)	Black	Jackson, TN	
2021-11-14	Quillan Jacobs (30)	Black	Columbia, MO	
2021-11-13	Carlos David Ortega (37)	Hispanic	Baltimore, MD	
2021-11-13	Isaac Bell III (41)	Unknown race	Biloxi, MS	
2021-11-12	Jamelle Lashay Cooper ()	Black	Phoenix, AZ	
2021-11-12	Wendy Carolina Flores De Roque (40)	Hispanic	Commerce, CA	
2021-11-11	Brian Astarita (65)	White	New York, NY	
2021-11-11	Elliot Lewis (42)	Black	Houston, TX	
2021-11-11	Gerry Donald Cooper (44)	White	Gunnison, CO	
2021-11-11	Jessiram Hweih Rivera (24)	Unknown	Polk County, Florida	Rivera, of Winter Haven, was shot and killed by a deputy after walking towards him with a shovel.
2021-11-11	Seth S. Rynio (21)	Unknown race	Springfield, MO	
2021-11-09	Dashaun Wright (37)	Black	Boston, MA	
2021-11-08	Angie McFarland (50)	White	Monteagle, TN	
2021-11-08	Name Withheld ()	Unknown race	Renton, WA	
2021-11-07	Andrew Dzwonchyk (40)	White	Union Township, PA	
2021-11-07	Rolando Zuniga Bueno (34)	Unknown race	Houston, TX	
2021-11-07	Timothy Parks (34)	White	Knowlton Township, NJ	
2021-11-06	Amity Jo Grey (47)	White	Chesapeake, VA	
2021-11-06	Brian Michael Price (45)	White	Chesapeake, VA	
2021-11-06	Chelsae L. Clevenger-Kirk (29)	White	Goodview, VA	
2021-11-06	Corey Gene Batt (31)	White	Broken Arrow, OK	
2021-11-06	Eldred Wells Sr. (70)	Black	Joliet Township, Illinois	Police responded to reports of a disturbance and shot Muhammad after he allegedly stabbed Wells, his grandfather. Wells was also shot in the back and left hand.
2021-11-06	Jabbar Muhammad (21)	Black	Joliet Township, Illinois	Police responded to reports of a disturbance and shot Muhammad after he allegedly stabbed Wells, his grandfather. Wells was also shot in the back and left hand.
2021-11-06	Mark D. Walker II (34)	Unknown race	Long Branch, NJ	
2021-11-06	Michael A. Quarrles (37)	Black	Dorchester, MA	
2021-11-06	Tony Elliot Singleton (53)	Unknown	Henrico County, Virginia	An officer responded to a report of a car crash and shot Singleton "during an encounter", according to police. According to investigators Singleton had a bladed weapon in his waistband. The officer was later indicted on manslaughter charges.
2021-11-05	Derrell Lamar Raney (33)	Black	Charlotte, NC	
2021-11-05	Jessica Worsham (43)	White	Hoschton, GA	
2021-11-04	Barry Rigsby (36)	Black	Wisner, LA	
2021-11-04	Derek Collins (36)	White	Tulsa, OK	
2021-11-03	Carlos Teofilo Garza (38)	Hispanic	McAllen, TX	
2021-11-03	Gary Wayne Bressler (48)	White	Williamstown, KY	
2021-11-03	Isaiah Suarez Rodriguez (12)	Latino	South Gate, California	An off-duty Los Angeles County Sheriff's deputy t-boned a vehicle while driving his pick-up truck, killing Suarez Rodriguez and injuring four others. According to prosecutors the deputy was driving at 90 miles per hour in a school zone where the speed limit was 25 miles per hour. In 2023 he was charged with murder, vehicular manslaughter, and reckless driving.
2021-11-03	Johnny Michael Gilbert (43)	White	Covington, GA	
2021-11-03	Jose Enrique Cortez (26)	Hispanic	Glendale, AZ	
2021-11-03	LeKenneth Q. Miller (30)	Black	Eau Claire, WI	
2021-11-02	German Villasenor (44)	Latino	Chicago, Illinois	German Villasenor, an off-duty Chicago Police officer was shot and killed by his wife, also an officer, after a domestic dispute that involved a struggle over a gun. Villasenor's wife was later charged with involuntary manslaughter.
2021-11-02	German Villaseñor (44)	Hispanic	Chicago, IL	
2021-11-02	Johnny McGee (36)	Black	Houma, Louisiana	An officer responding to a mental health call shot and killed McGee, who police say charged at officers with a screwdriver.
2021-11-02	Kody Marshall (15)	White	Aransas Pass, TX	
2021-11-01	Damian Dymka (29)	White	Newark, New Jersey	Dymka, a nurse, was struck and killed by an off-duty Newark Police officer on the Garden State Parkway. According to police, after striking Dymka, the officer and his passenger later returned to the scene, put Dymka's body in his car, and took him back to the officer's home. The officer then went back to the scene with Dymka's body. The officer, his passenger, and the officer's mother were all arrested and charged.
2021-11-01	Johnny McGee (36)	Black	Houma, LA	

== See also ==
- Death in custody § United States
- Henry A. Wallace Police Crime Public Database
- List of cases of police brutality
- List of countries with annual rates and counts for killings by law enforcement officers
- List of law enforcement officers killed in the line of duty in the United States
- List of law enforcement officers convicted for an on-duty killing in the United States
- List of police reforms related to the George Floyd protests
- List of unarmed African Americans killed by law enforcement officers in the United States
- Lists of killings by law enforcement officers
- Police brutality in the United States
- Police misconduct § United States
- Police riot § United States
- Police use of deadly force in the United States
