= Preston Heights, Illinois =

Preston Heights
- Unincorporated community Census designated place
- Location in Will County and the state of Illinois.
- Coordinates: 41°29′48″N 88°4′21″W
- Country: United States
- State: Illinois
- County: Will

Area
  - Total: 1.21 sq mi (3.13 km^{2})
  - Land: 1.21 sq mi (3.13 km^{2})
  - Water: 0 sq mi (0.00 km^{2})
- Elevation: 617 ft (188 m)

Population (2020)
  - Total: 2,898
  - Density: 2,395.6/sq mi (924.94/km^{2})
- Time zone: UTC-6 (CST)
  - Summer (DST): UTC-5 (CDT)
- Area codes: 815, 779
- FIPS code: 17-61860

Preston Heights is an unincorporated community and census-designated place (CDP) in Will County, Illinois, United States. As of the 2020 census, the CDP population was 2,898.

== Geography ==
Preston Heights is located at 41°29′48″N 88°4′21″W (41.496564, -88.072573).

According to the United States Census Bureau, the CDP has a total area of 1.5 square miles (3.9 km^{2}), all land.

== Demographics ==
Historical population
Census	Pop.	Note	%±
2000	2,527		—
2010	2,575		1.9%
2020	2,898		12.5%
U.S. Decennial Census; 2020

=== Racial and ethnic composition ===
Preston Heights CDP, Illinois – Racial and ethnic composition Note: the US Census treats Hispanic/Latino as an ethnic category. This table excludes Latinos from the racial categories and assigns them to a separate category. Hispanics/Latinos may be of any race.
Race / Ethnicity (NH = Non-Hispanic)	Pop 2000	Pop 2010	Pop 2020	% 2000	% 2010	% 2020
White alone (NH)	741	618	521	29.32%	24.00%	17.98%
Black or African American alone (NH)	1,598	1,479	1,428	63.24%	57.44%	49.28%
Native American or Alaska Native alone (NH)	8	9	5	0.32%	0.35%	0.17%
Asian alone (NH)	2	3	6	0.08%	0.12%	0.21%
Native Hawaiian or Pacific Islander alone (NH)	4	0	0	0.16%	0.00%	0.00%
Other race alone (NH)	3	4	20	0.12%	0.16%	0.69%
Mixed race or Multiracial (NH)	34	72	86	1.35%	2.80%	2.97%
Hispanic or Latino (any race)	137	390	832	5.42%	15.15%	28.71%
Total	2,527	2,575	2,898	100.00%	100.00%	100.00%

=== 2020 census ===
As of the 2020 census, Preston Heights had a population of 2,898. The median age was 36.4 years. 25.9% of residents were under the age of 18 and 15.6% of residents were 65 years of age or older. For every 100 females there were 96.5 males, and for every 100 females age 18 and over there were 97.7 males age 18 and over.

100.0% of residents lived in urban areas, while 0.0% lived in rural areas.

There were 1,061 households in Preston Heights, of which 33.7% had children under the age of 18 living in them. Of all households, 34.7% were married-couple households, 22.9% were households with a male householder and no spouse or partner present, and 33.4% were households with a female householder and no spouse or partner present. About 24.9% of all households were made up of individuals and 10.0% had someone living alone who was 65 years of age or older.

There were 1,146 housing units, of which 7.4% were vacant. The homeowner vacancy rate was 1.6% and the rental vacancy rate was 6.5%.

=== 2000 census ===
As of the census of 2000, there were 2,527 people, 875 households, and 655 families residing in the CDP. The population density was 1,691.4 inhabitants per square mile (653.1/km^{2}). There were 930 housing units at an average density of 622.5 per square mile (240.3/km^{2}). The racial makeup of the CDP was 30.99% White, 63.47% African American, 0.55% Native American, 0.12% Asian, 0.20% Pacific Islander, 2.77% from other races, and 1.90% from two or more races. Hispanic or Latino of any race were 5.42% of the population.

There were 875 households, out of which 39.2% had children under the age of 18 living with them, 45.0% were married couples living together, 24.5% had a female householder with no husband present, and 25.1% were non-families. 19.9% of all households were made up of individuals, and 5.0% had someone living alone who was 65 years of age or older. The average household size was 2.89 and the average family size was 3.31.

In the CDP, the population was spread out, with 32.1% under the age of 18, 10.2% from 18 to 24, 28.3% from 25 to 44, 21.2% from 45 to 64, and 8.2% who were 65 years of age or older. The median age was 31 years. For every 100 females, there were 90.0 males. For every 100 females age 18 and over, there were 85.3 males.

The median income for a household in the CDP was $42,500, and the median income for a family was $46,331. Males had a median income of $38,875 versus $25,944 for females. The per capita income for the CDP was $18,681. About 8.6% of families and 9.7% of the population were below the poverty line, including 11.7% of those under age 18 and 8.7% of those age 65 or over.

== Transportation ==
Pace provides bus service on Routes 504, 511 and 512 connecting Preston Heights to downtown Joliet and other destinations.

== Education ==
It is mostly in the Laraway Community Consolidated School District 70C, with portions in the Joliet Public School District 86. All of it is in the Joliet Township High School District 204.

Some students are zoned to Joliet Central High School while others are zoned to Joliet West High School.
