= Christ Episcopal Church (Joliet, Illinois) =

Historic church in Illinois, United States

- U.S. National Register of Historic Places
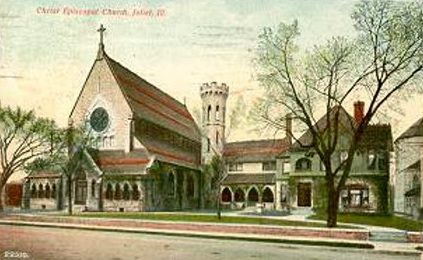
- A postcard of the church from 1913

- Location within Illinois
- Location: 75 West Van Buren Street; Joliet, Illinois
- Coordinates: 41°31′33″N 88°5′3″W
- Built: 1884
- Architect: F. S. Allen
- Architectural style: Gothic Revival (Romanesque Revival)
- NRHP reference No.: 82002603
- Added to NRHP: August 12, 1982

The Christ Episcopal Church was a historic building and former church in Joliet, Illinois.

== History ==
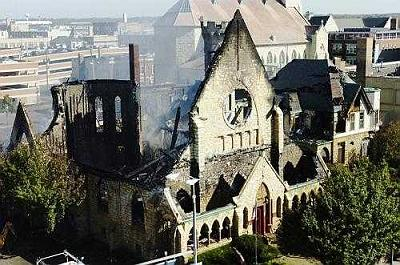
The charred remains of the former church.

The Episcopal congregation in Joliet, Illinois formed in 1865 and was one of the first five congregations of the denomination in Illinois. The congregation required a larger church in the 1880s. Frank Shaver Allen was commissioned to build the church in 1884-1885. Allen was living in Streator and had designed several buildings there, including the City Hall. Allen moved to Joliet in 1887 and later constructed many other buildings, including Joliet Township High School. Allen was only 24 when he submitted his plans for the church's construction.

The building was recognized by the National Park Service with a listing on the National Register of Historic Places in 1982. The church closed in 2004, and the congregation left for the St. Edward Church. A group of local investors purchased the building in 2006 for use as a concert hall. A fire on October 8, 2006 destroyed most of the building, and the fate of the land remains uncertain.

== Architecture ==
The church was 120 by 60 feet (37 m × 18 m) and could seat seven hundred. The building also had a 50 by 40 feet (15 m × 12 m) chapel on the west end. It was built with Joliet limestone, largely in the Gothic Revival style with some influence from the emerging Romanesque Revival. The parsonage expressed elements of the Queen Anne style. The bell tower at the junction of the parish and church features a castellated turret. The main aisle was not vaulted, but was instead was highly peaked with red oak strips. The altar and pews were also carved from red oak. The parish hall was remodeled in 1925.
