= Ingalls Park, Illinois =

Ingalls Park
- Unincorporated community Census designated place
- Location in Will County and the state of Illinois.
- Coordinates: 41°31′13″N 88°2′15″W
- Country: United States
- State: Illinois
- County: Will

Area
  - Total: 1.11 sq mi (2.88 km^{2})
  - Land: 1.11 sq mi (2.88 km^{2})
  - Water: 0 sq mi (0.00 km^{2})
- Elevation: 623 ft (190 m)

Population (2020)
  - Total: 3,460
  - Density: 3,115.9/sq mi (1,203.04/km^{2})
- Time zone: UTC-6 (CST)
  - Summer (DST): UTC-5 (CDT)
- ZIP code: 60433
- Area codes: 815, 779
- FIPS code: 17-37465

Ingalls Park is an unincorporated community, census-designated place (CDP), and suburb of Joliet in Will County, Illinois, United States. As of the 2020 census, Ingalls Park had a population of 3,460. The town consists of a small neighborhood and a few businesses between Joliet's Pilcher Park and Interstate 80. It is the nearest town to Chicagoland Speedway, which hosted the NASCAR Cup Series from 2001 to 2019.

== Geography ==
Ingalls Park is located at 41°31′13″N 88°2′15″W (41.520281, -88.037405).

According to the United States Census Bureau, the CDP has a total area of 1.1 square miles (2.8 km^{2}), all land.

== Demographics ==
Historical population
Census	Pop.	Note	%±
2020	3,460		—
U.S. Decennial Census

=== 2020 census ===
As of the 2020 census, Ingalls Park had a population of 3,460. The median age was 34.1 years. 26.4% of residents were under the age of 18 and 10.5% of residents were 65 years of age or older. For every 100 females there were 100.5 males, and for every 100 females age 18 and over there were 104.7 males age 18 and over.

100.0% of residents lived in urban areas, while 0.0% lived in rural areas.

There were 1,257 households in Ingalls Park, of which 33.7% had children under the age of 18 living in them. Of all households, 38.3% were married-couple households, 25.3% were households with a male householder and no spouse or partner present, and 26.8% were households with a female householder and no spouse or partner present. About 28.4% of all households were made up of individuals and 9.8% had someone living alone who was 65 years of age or older.

There were 1,335 housing units, of which 5.8% were vacant. The homeowner vacancy rate was 0.8% and the rental vacancy rate was 5.8%.

Racial composition as of the 2020 census
Race	Number	Percent
White	1,591	46.0%
Black or African American	364	10.5%
American Indian and Alaska Native	41	1.2%
Asian	23	0.7%
Native Hawaiian and Other Pacific Islander	0	0.0%
Some other race	825	23.8%
Two or more races	616	17.8%
Hispanic or Latino (of any race)	1,637	47.3%

=== 2000 census ===
As of the 2000 census, there were 3,082 people, 1,244 households, and 808 families residing in the CDP. The population density was 2,850.3 inhabitants per square mile (1,100.5/km^{2}). There were 1,297 housing units at an average density of 1,199.5 per square mile (463.1/km^{2}). The racial makeup of the CDP was 89.62% White, 2.95% African American, 0.32% Native American, 0.29% Asian, 3.99% from other races, and 2.82% from two or more races. Hispanic or Latino of any race were 12.91% of the population.

There were 1,244 households, out of which 30.3% had children under the age of 18 living with them, 48.6% were married couples living together, 11.3% had a female householder with no husband present, and 35.0% were non-families. 28.7% of all households were made up of individuals, and 9.5% had someone living alone who was 65 years of age or older. The average household size was 2.48 and the average family size was 3.06.

In the CDP, the population was spread out, with 24.4% under the age of 18, 9.3% from 18 to 24, 33.9% from 25 to 44, 19.4% from 45 to 64, and 13.0% who were 65 years of age or older. The median age was 34 years. For every 100 females, there were 101.7 males. For every 100 females age 18 and over, there were 99.1 males.

The median income for a household in the CDP was $44,076, and the median income for a family was $48,750. Males had a median income of $41,507 versus $24,868 for females. The per capita income for the CDP was $18,628. About 3.9% of families and 5.1% of the population were below the poverty line, including 3.3% of those under age 18 and 9.3% of those age 65 or over.

== Transportation ==
Pace provides bus service on Route 508 connecting Ingalls Park to downtown Joliet and other destinations.

== Education ==
It is in the Joliet Public School District 86 and the Joliet Township High School District 204.

It zoned to Joliet Central High School.
