= The Girls Get Even =

1993 children's novel by Phyllis Reynolds Naylor

- First edition cover (pub. Delacorte Books)
- Author: Phyllis Reynolds Naylor
- Language: English
- Publisher: Delacorte Books for Young Readers
- Publication date: January 1, 1993
- ISBN: 978-0-385-31029-1

The Girls Get Even is a children's novel by Phyllis Reynolds Naylor published by Random House, originally in 1993. The paperback is ISBN 0-440-41842-9 and it is also available as an e-book. It is part of the Boys Against Girls series. It is also issued in a double format with The Boys Start the War. The book is set in the fictional town of Buckman, West Virginia, which is based on the actual town of Buckhannon.

== Plot ==
The Malloy girls find out the Hatford boys are going camping and plan to throw their clothes in the river. When the boys find out, both sides make a deal, that whoever makes the best Halloween costume will get to boss the other team around for a whole month. At the Halloween carnival the boys sabotage the girls' costume and the girls sabotage the boys’ costume. The boys are so upset they plan a trick on the girls; they make a fake party invitation saying to go to the cemetery and follow the clues they see, and at the end of the clues the boys would pour worms and pasta all over them. But the girls tricked the boys by emptying the bucket of worms and pasta. The boys missed their chance of getting candy, when they got home the girls were waiting and ready for a party.
