= Rockdale, Illinois =

Rockdale
- Village
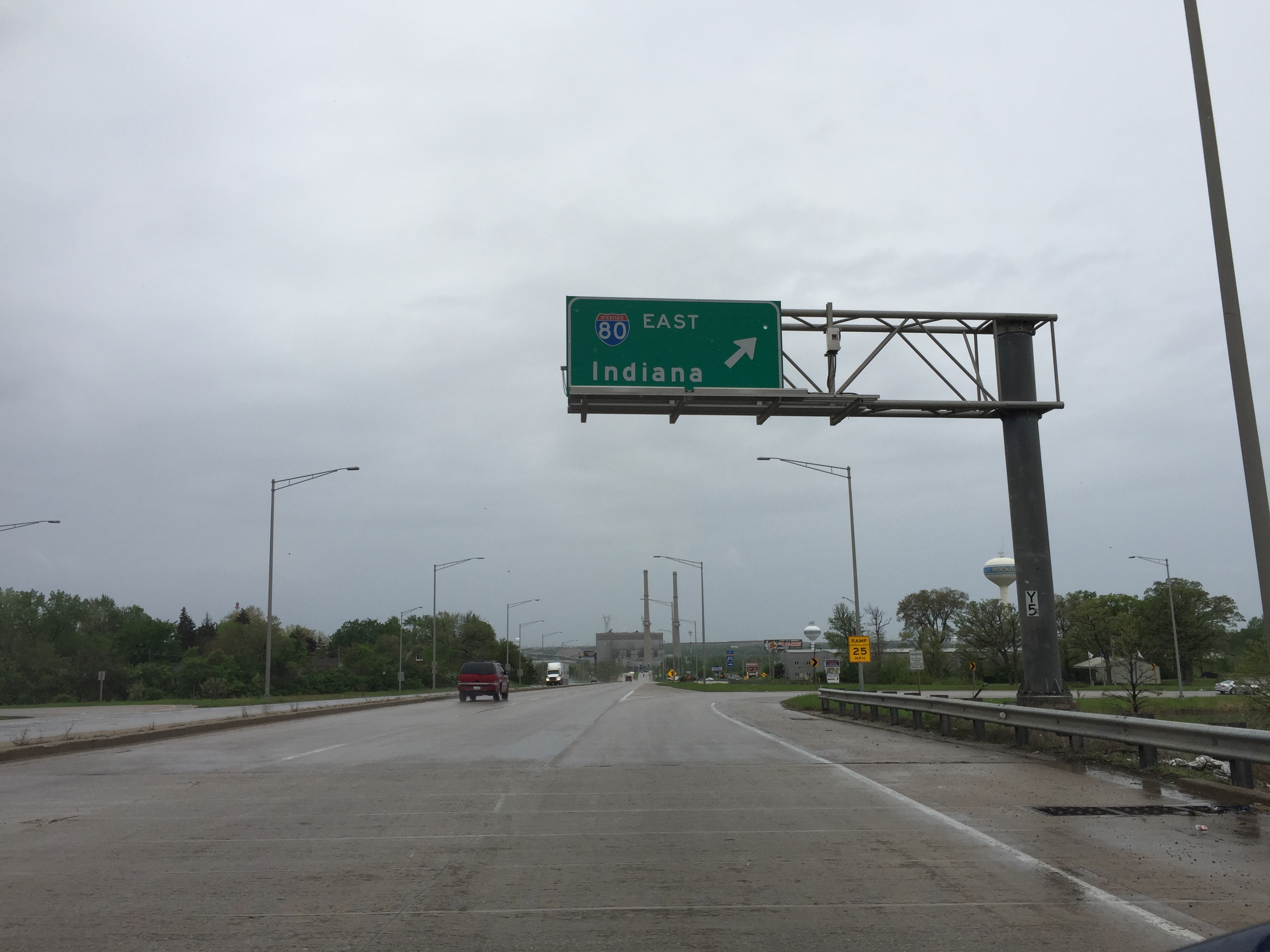
- Illinois Route 7 at the Rockdale village limit at Interstate 80
- Motto: "Harmony And Industry"
- Location of Rockdale in Will County, Illinois.

- Location of Illinois in the United States
- Coordinates: 41°30′27″N 88°6′55″W
- Country: United States
- State: Illinois
- County: Will

Area
  - Total: 1.41 sq mi (3.65 km^{2})
  - Land: 1.41 sq mi (3.65 km^{2})
  - Water: 0 sq mi (0.00 km^{2})

Population (2020)
  - Total: 2,012
  - Density: 1,426/sq mi (550.6/km^{2})
- Time zone: UTC-6 (CST)
  - Summer (DST): UTC-5 (CDT)
- ZIP Code(s): 60436, 60497
- Area code: 815
- FIPS code: 17-64902
- Wikimedia Commons: Rockdale, Illinois
- Website: rockdaleillinois.org

Rockdale is a village in Will County, Illinois, United States. As of the 2020 census, Rockdale had a population of 2,012.

== Geography ==
Rockdale is located at 41°30′27″N 88°6′55″W (41.507480, -88.115233). It is immediately south of the city of Joliet, and is about 36 miles (58 km) southwest of Chicago.

According to the 2010 census, Rockdale has a total area of 0.79 square miles (2.05 km^{2}), all land. Rockdale was founded in 1894 by a group of local businessmen.

== Demographics ==
Historical population
Census	Pop.	Note	%±
1910	1,101		—
1920	1,478		34.2%
1930	1,701		15.1%
1940	1,532		−9.9%
1950	1,393		−9.1%
1960	1,272		−8.7%
1970	2,015		58.4%
1980	1,913		−5.1%
1990	1,709		−10.7%
2000	1,888		10.5%
2010	1,976		4.7%
2020	2,012		1.8%
U.S. Decennial Census

=== Racial and ethnic composition ===
Rockdale village, Illinois – Racial and ethnic composition Note: the US Census treats Hispanic/Latino as an ethnic category. This table excludes Latinos from the racial categories and assigns them to a separate category. Hispanics/Latinos may be of any race.
Race / Ethnicity (NH = Non-Hispanic)	Pop 2000	Pop 2010	Pop 2020	% 2000	% 2010	% 2020
White alone (NH)	1,413	1,174	1,015	74.84%	59.41%	50.45%
Black or African American alone (NH)	13	73	138	0.69%	3.69%	6.86%
Native American or Alaska Native alone (NH)	8	8	2	0.42%	0.40%	0.10%
Asian alone (NH)	7	10	9	0.37%	0.51%	0.45%
Native Hawaiian or Pacific Islander alone (NH)	0	0	0	0.00%	0.00%	0.00%
Other race alone (NH)	6	1	10	0.32%	0.05%	0.50%
Mixed race or Multiracial (NH)	26	10	80	1.38%	0.51%	3.98%
Hispanic or Latino (any race)	415	700	758	21.98%	35.43%	37.67%
Total	1,888	1,976	2,012	100.00%	100.00%	100.00%

=== 2020 census ===
As of the 2020 census, Rockdale had a population of 2,012. The median age was 37.3 years. 22.8% of residents were under the age of 18 and 12.4% of residents were 65 years of age or older. For every 100 females there were 100.6 males, and for every 100 females age 18 and over there were 92.4 males age 18 and over.

100.0% of residents lived in urban areas, while 0.0% lived in rural areas.

There were 800 households in Rockdale, of which 30.9% had children under the age of 18 living in them. Of all households, 33.4% were married-couple households, 24.9% were households with a male householder and no spouse or partner present, and 32.4% were households with a female householder and no spouse or partner present. About 32.7% of all households were made up of individuals and 10.6% had someone living alone who was 65 years of age or older.

There were 866 housing units, of which 7.6% were vacant. The homeowner vacancy rate was 3.9% and the rental vacancy rate was 3.1%.

=== 2000 census ===
As of the census of 2000, there were 1,888 people, 762 households, and 473 families residing in the village. The population density was 2,377.4 inhabitants per square mile (917.9/km^{2}). There were 826 housing units at an average density of 1,040.1 per square mile (401.6/km^{2}). The racial makeup of the village was 82.89% White, 0.85% African American, 0.48% Native American, 0.37% Asian, 10.86% from other races, and 4.56% from two or more races. Hispanic or Latino of any race were 21.98% of the population.

There were 762 households, out of which 30.2% had children under the age of 18 living with them, 45.0% were married couples living together, 10.8% had a female householder with no husband present, and 37.8% were non-families. 31.1% of all households were made up of individuals, and 11.4% had someone living alone who was 65 years of age or older. The average household size was 2.47 and the average family size was 3.11.

The median income for a household in the village was $39,954, and the median income for a family was $47,232. Males had a median income of $35,761 versus $24,375 for females. The per capita income for the village was $18,738. About 7.7% of families and 9.3% of the population were below the poverty line, including 13.1% of those under age 18 and 4.5% of those age 65 or over.

== Emergency service ==
The village's fire suppression services are operated by the Rockdale Fire Protection district. EMS is provided by Daley's Ambulance, and law enforcement by Rockdale Police.

== Transportation ==
Pace provides bus service on Route 505 connecting Rockdale to downtown Joliet and other destinations. Rockdale is served by the former Rock Island Main Line.

== Education ==
It is mostly in the Rockdale School District 84, with a small portion in the Joliet Public School District 86. All of it is in the Joliet Township High School District 204.

All areas zoned for residential use are zoned to Joliet Central High School.
