= Louise Lentz Woodruff =

American sculptor

- Born: 1893; Roanoke, Virginia
- Died: 1992 (aged 98–99)
- Known for: sculptor
- Notable work: Science Advancing Mankind

Louise Lentz Woodruff (1893-1966) was an American sculptor.

== Biography ==
Louise Lentz Woodruff was born in Roanoke, Virginia and grew up in Joliet, Illinois. She studied at the Finch School in New York City and then Columbia University, where she decided to become a sculptor. She studied sculpture with Lorado Taft and Charles Mulligan at the School of the Art Institute of Chicago, and with French artist Antoine Bourdelle in Paris.

She is most known for the sculpture she designed for the Fountain of Science at the Century of Progress 1933-1934 World's Fair in Chicago, located in front of the main entrance to the Hall of Science. The sculpture, known as Science Advancing Mankind, depicted an abstract robot form nudging a male and female figure forward, which exemplified the fair's themes of scientific and technological progress. After the fair, in 1935, she donated the sculpture to Joliet Township High School, now Joliet Central High School, where students dubbed it the "Steelman" and it served as the school team name and mascot.

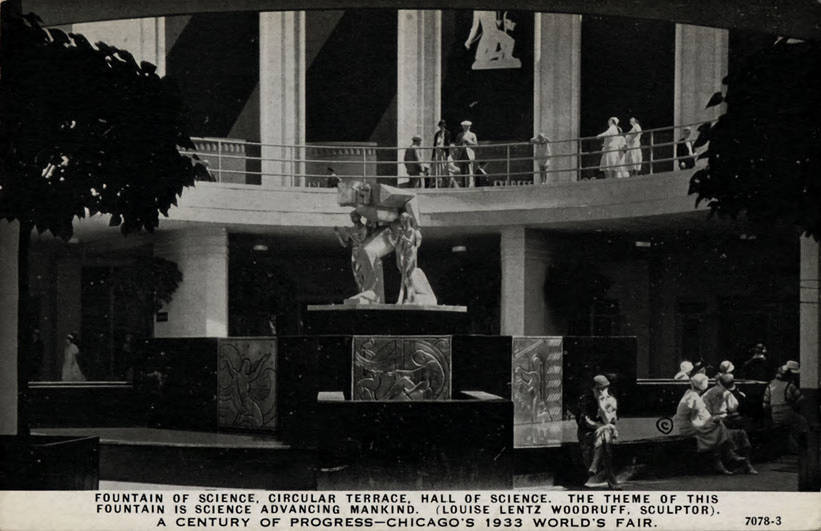
