= Sioux City Central High School and Central Annex =

- U.S. National Register of Historic Places
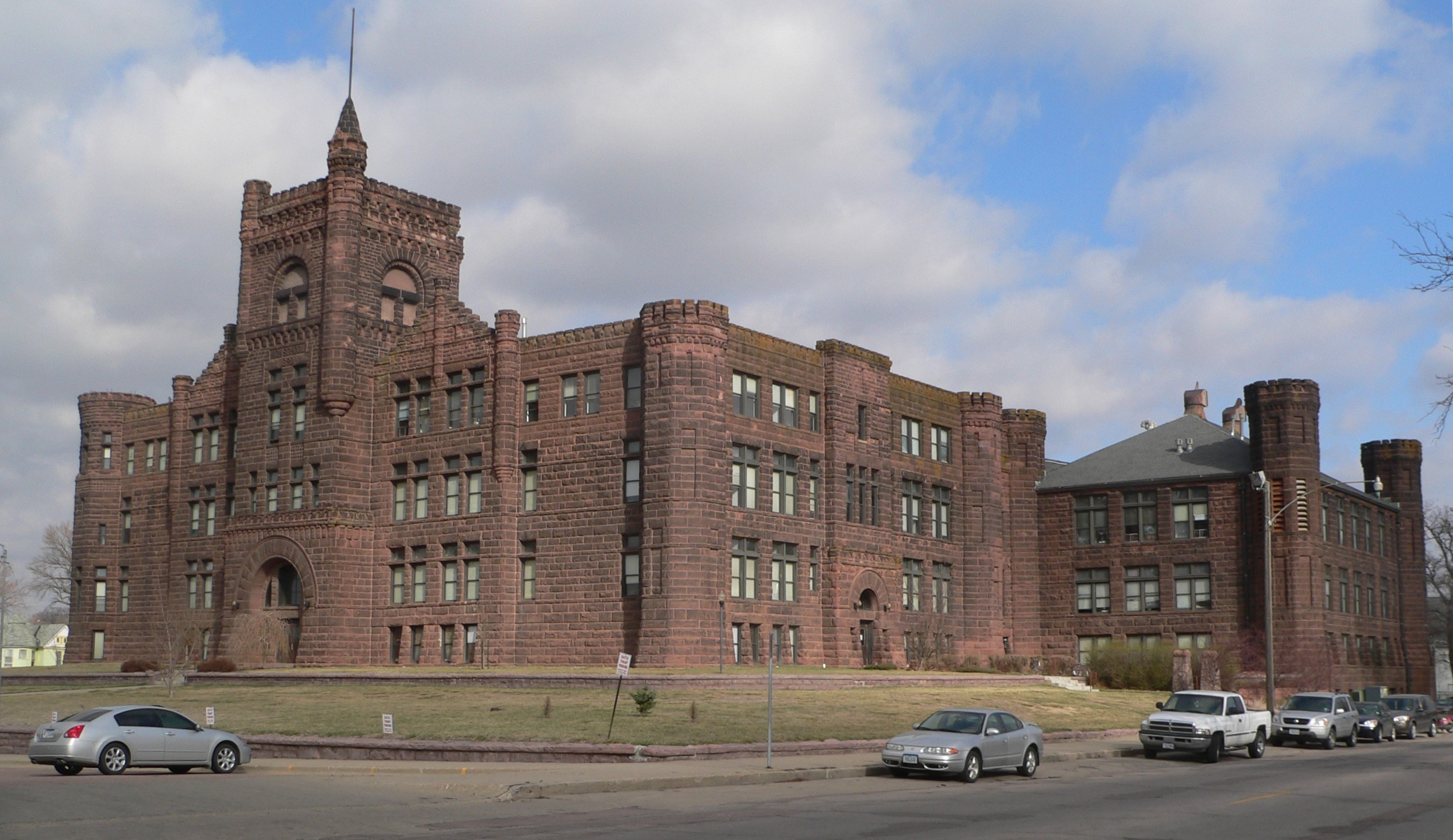
- Sioux City Central High School building

- Location within Iowa Location within the United States
- Location: 1212 Nebraska & 1121 Jackson Sts., Sioux City, Iowa
- Coordinates: 42°30′12.6″N 96°24′10.3″W
- Area: less than one acre
- Built: 1892
- Built by: Eric Lund
- Architect: F.S. Allen
- Architectural style: Gothic Revival; Romanesque Revival
- NRHP reference No.: 74000817 (original); 16000641 (increase)

Significant dates
- Added to NRHP: July 23, 1974
- Boundary increase: September 19, 2016

The Sioux City Central High School and Central Annex, also known as the Castle on the Hill, are historic buildings located in Sioux City, Iowa, United States. The high school building was listed on the National Register of Historic Places in 1974. The annex was added to the historic designation in 2016.

== History ==
The building was designed by Joliet, Illinois architect F.S. Allen, and built by contractor Eric Lund of Minneapolis. The Gothic Revival and Romanesque Revival structure was built for $104,460, and it reflects the flamboyant attitude of the community during a period of economic expansion. The exterior is composed of brownish-pink Lake Superior Sandstone. It features a large central bell tower that is flanked by two projecting pavilions that are capped by a stepped-gable roof, and turrets at the corners. Initially, this was a three-story building capped with a hipped roof.

By 1911 the building had become too small. The north wing was completed in 1912 for $225,000, and it was designed to complement the original building. The stone was purposely smoked to match the older stone. The school received the name Central High School in 1924 when other schools were built. The building was expanded again in 1930 when the hipped roof was removed and the fourth floor was added. The whole interior of the building was also remodeled at that time. The final expansion was the brick annex that was built to the south of the main building. Central High School was closed in 1972 when three new high schools were built in the city.

The Castle on the Hill Association acquired the building from the local school district for $1 in 1976. Initially, it housed various nonprofit organizations. NuStyle Development Corporation of Woodbine, Iowa converted the building into apartments. After extensive renovations the Castle on the Hill Apartments were opened in 2003. In May 2016 plans to convert the annex into 50 more apartments were unveiled.

== Notable graduates ==
- John Crouse (class of 1926), Academy Award nominated special effects artist and cameraman
- George Koval
