= Justus McNair =

American basketball player (born 2005)

- Justus McNair with Valparaiso in 2024

No. 1 – Valparaiso Beacons
- Position: Point guard
- League: Missouri Valley Conference

Personal information
- Born: October 15, 2005 (age 21)
- Listed height: 6 ft 3 in (1.91 m)
- Listed weight: 195 lb (88 kg)

Career information
- High school: Joliet West (Joliet, Illinois)
- College: Valparaiso (2024–present)

Justus McNair (born October 15, 2005) is an American college basketball player for the Valparaiso Beacons of the Missouri Valley Conference.

== Early life and high school ==
Justus grew up in Joliet, Illinois and played at Joliet West. He averaged 21 points, 7 rebounds, and 4 assists his senior season.

== College career ==
Justus committed to play college basketball at Valparaiso. His head coach Roger Powell Jr also played at Joliet West High School. On December 20, 2024, he hit a buzzer beater to lift Valpo over Western Michigan.

On November 6, 2026, Justus hit a buzzer beater in double-overtime to beat the nationally ranked Purdue Boilermakers at Mackey Arena. This marked Valpo's first true road win over a ranked opponent ever, previously 0-44. This was Valpo's first win over a power-conference opponent since Nov. 21, 2016 against Alabama. Several other streaks and records were broken because of Justus's game winner.

== Personal life ==
Justus is a Christian, and is the son of Wayne and Andrea McNair.
