= The Boys Start the War =

The Boys Start the War is the first of many novels in a series of children's books by Phyllis Reynolds Naylor. The series is centered on two families, the Hatfords, who have four sons, Jake, Josh, Wally, and Peter, and the Malloys, who have three daughters, Eddie, Beth, and Caroline. The names Hatford and Malloy are probably a reference to the Hatfields and McCoys, actual West Virginia families who famously feuded for many years. The Malloys are temporarily staying in a house across the street to the Hatfords, which was once owned by a family of boys (the Bensons) who were best friends of the Hatford boys.

The Hatford boys resent the girls for taking their place, and the children of both families begin playing pranks on each other, without letting their parents know. Subplots in the series include the children trying to capture a loose cougar that has been frightening people in the town, Caroline's overdramatic behavior and aspirations to become an actress, Josh and Beth's brief love affair, and Jake and Eddie's rivalry. In the end, the Bensons move back into their house and the Malloys leave for their old home, but not before the Hatfords and Malloys both prank each other with ladybugs, resulting in a stalemate. The books take place in the fictional town of Buckman, West Virginia, which is based on the actual town of Buckhannon; the author has acknowledged the town in a book dedication. The Hartford boys call the Malloys "The Whomper, the Weirdo, and the Crazy" due to Eddie's abilities in baseball, Beth's odd love of horror books, and Caroline's willingness to do any stunt.

== Books in the series ==
- The Boys Start the War (1993)
- The Girls Get Even (1993)
- Boys Against Girls (1994)
- The Girls' Revenge (1998)
- A Traitor Among the Boys (1999)
- A Spy Among the Girls (2000)
- The Boys Return (2001)
- The Girls Take Over (2002)
- Boys in Control (2003)
- Girls Rule (2004)
- Boys Rock (2005)
- Who Won the War? (2006)
