= Phyllis Reynolds Naylor =

American writer (born 1933)

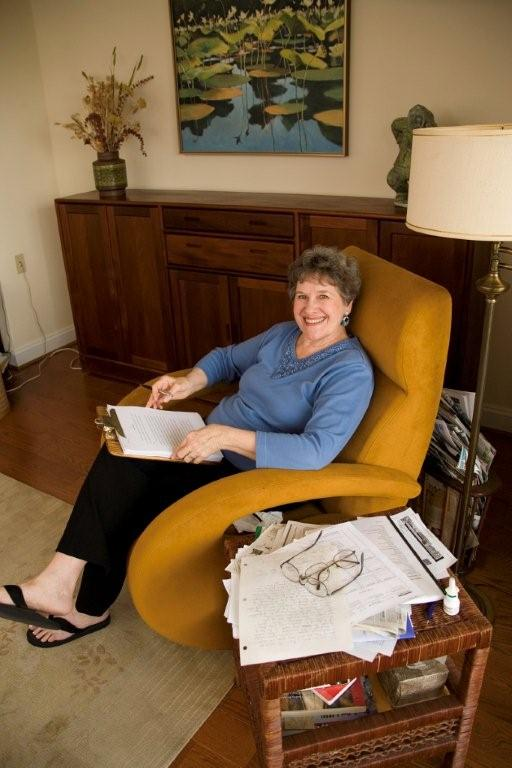
- Naylor in her writing chair, 2011
- Born: Phyllis Dean Reynolds; January 4, 1933 (age 93); Anderson, Indiana, U.S.
- Education: American University (BA)
- Occupation: Writer
- Spouse: Thomas A. Tedesco Jr. (m. 1951–1960) Rex Naylor (m. 1960; died 2012)
- Children: Jeffery Naylor; Michael Naylor
- Writing career
- Period: 1965–present
- Notable awards: Newbery Medal; 1992
- Website: phyllisnaylor.com

Phyllis Reynolds Naylor (born January 4, 1933) is an American writer best known for children's and young adult fiction. Naylor is best known for her children's-novel quartet Shiloh (a 1992 Newbery Medal winner) and for her "Alice" book series, one of the most frequently challenged books of the early 21st century.

== Early life ==
Phyllis Reynolds Naylor was born in Anderson, Indiana. She grew up during the Great Depression with her older sister Norma and younger brother John. She has said that she never felt poor, as her parents had a book collection and read stories aloud to her and her siblings until adolescence. Her favorite book as a child was Huckleberry Finn. She began writing her own stories when she was in elementary school. When she was 16 years old, a Sunday school teacher asked her to write a story for the church magazine. She wrote a baseball story named "Mike's Hero" and was paid $4.67 for it. She decided to expand, sending her writing to youth magazines Highlights, Seventeen, and Jack and Jill, receiving two years of rejection letters. Naylor graduated from Joliet Township High School in 1951 and from Joliet Junior College in 1953. When she was 18 years old, she married her first husband and they soon moved to Chicago, where she worked as a clinical secretary in a university hospital. Years later, her husband began showing signs of severe mental illness, requiring her to seek out treatment for him all over the country. To support them, Naylor wrote and worked a series of jobs including assistant executive secretary, an elementary school teacher and eventually got a job as an editorial assistant for a magazine. He was eventually diagnosed with paranoid schizophrenia, and with no hope of recovery, they divorced.

== Career ==
Settling in Maryland, Naylor decided to attend American University, graduating in 1963 with a BA degree. In 1960, Naylor married Rex Naylor, a speech pathologist whom she met at church. Together they had two sons. Naylor planned to work towards a master's degree in clinical psychology but decided to become a full-time author. Her first children's book was called The Galloping Goat and Other Stories and was published in 1965. Since then, Naylor has written an average of two books a year, many receiving special recognition by the American Library Association and the International Reading Association, and have also been selections for the Junior Literary Guild. In 1985 she received the Edgar Allan Poe Award for her 1984 novel Night Cry.

In 1991, Naylor published the children's book Shiloh about a young boy and an abused dog set in West Virginia. The book won the Newbery Medal in 1992, putting Naylor in the national spotlight. The book went on to win the Sequoyah Children's Book Award, the Mark Twain Readers Award, and the William Allen White Children's Book Award in 1994, and was also selected as an American Library Association Notable Children's Book. In 1999, Shiloh was selected as a recommended novel for children aged nine to twelve in the Read Across America initiative. A few years later, Naylor went on to write two sequels to the book: Shiloh Season and Saving Shiloh, published in 1996 and 1997, respectively. In 2000, the Shiloh trilogy placed at number seven on the National Education Association's Children's Top 100 book list. In an interview, Naylor said she was delighted that children had given her work such a high ranking. (Note: The six literary works ranked before Shiloh were the Goosebumps series, Green Eggs and Ham, The Cat in the Hat, the Arthur series and Charlotte's Web.) In 1985, Naylor wrote The Agony of Alice, about a sixth-grade motherless girl looking for a role model while fumbling through life. Naylor soon began receiving letters and demands for more "Alice", which led her to write a sequel, and then eventually create the Alice series, in which Alice grows older in each book (Naylor would eventually write three prequels of a younger Alice). The series chronicles several months of Alice's life from ages 12 to 18, with the final book showing highlights of her life from 18 to 60. The Alice books have been lauded for realistically portraying the life of a regular girl and covering topics such as sex, which resulted in the books being one of the most frequently challenged and banned in libraries.

== Personal life ==
Naylor was married to Rex Naylor for 52 years, until his death in 2012. They have two sons, Jeffrey and Michael, and four grandchildren: Sophia (who is herself a writer, comedian, and playwright), Tressa, Garrett and Beckett. So far, she has written over 130 books, and about 2000 articles. Naylor says that she will write "as long as she can hold a pencil".

Naylor is also a founder of the PEN/Phyllis Naylor Grant for Children's and Young Adult Novelists.

== Awards ==
- Newbery Medal
- Edgar Allan Poe Mystery Writers Award
- Child Study Award
- Kerlan Award
- Foremother Award from National Center for Health Research, 2014

== Works ==
- Collections
  - Grasshoppers in the Soup (1965)
  - The Galloping Goat and Other Stories (1965)
  - Knee Deep in Ice Cream (1967)
  - Dark Side of the Moon (1969)
  - The Private I, and Other Stories (1969)
  - Ships in the Night (1970)
  - Never Born a Hero (1982)
  - A Triangle Has Four Sides (1984)
- Alice series
  - The Agony of Alice (1985)
  - Alice in Rapture, Sort of (1989)
  - Reluctantly Alice (1991)
  - All but Alice (1992)
  - Alice in April (1993)
  - Alice in-Between (1994)
  - Alice the Brave (1995)
  - Alice in Lace (1996)
  - Outrageously Alice (1997)
  - Achingly Alice (1998)
  - Alice on the Outside (1999)
  - The Grooming of Alice (2000)
  - Alice Alone (2001)
  - Simply Alice (2002)
  - Starting With Alice (2002) (prequel)
  - Alice in Blunderland (2003) (prequel)
  - Patiently Alice (2003)
  - Including Alice (2004)
  - Lovingly Alice (2004) (prequel)
  - Alice on Her Way (2005)
  - Alice in the Know (2006)
  - Dangerously Alice (2007)
  - Almost Alice (2008)
  - Intensely Alice (2009)
  - Alice in Charge (2010)
  - Incredibly Alice (2011)
  - Alice on Board (2012)
  - Now I'll Tell You Everything (2013)
- Shiloh series
  - Shiloh (1991)
  - Shiloh Season (1996)
  - Saving Shiloh (1997)
  - A Shiloh Christmas (2015)
- KittyCat Pack series
  - The Grand Escape by Phyllis Reynolds Naylor and Alan Daniel (1993)
  - The Healing of Texas Jake by Phyllis Reynolds Naylor and Alan Daniel (1997)
  - Carlotta's Kittens by Phyllis Reynolds Naylor and Alan Daniel (2000)
  - Polo's Mother by Phyllis Reynolds Naylor and Alan Daniel (2005)
- Hatfords and Malloys series
  - The Boys Start the War (1992)
  - The Girls Get Even (1993)
  - Boys Against Girls (1994)
  - The Girls' Revenge (1998)
  - A Traitor Among the Boys (1999)
  - A Spy Among the Girls (2000)
  - The Boys Return (2001)
  - The Girls Take Over (2002)
  - Boys in Control (2003)
  - Girls Rule! (2004)
  - Boys Rock! (2005)
  - Who Won the War? (2006)
- The Witch Saga series
  - Witch's Sister (1975)
  - Witch Water (1977)
  - The Witch Herself (1978)
  - The Witch's Eye (1990)
  - Witch Weed (1991)
  - The Witch Returns (1992)
- Bessledorf Mysteries
  - The Mad Gasser of Bessledorf Street (1983)
  - The Bodies in the Bessledorf Hotel (1986)
  - Bernie Magruder & the Haunted Hotel (1990)
  - Bernie and the Bessledorf Ghost (1993)
  - Bernie Magruder & the Drive-Thru Funeral Parlor (1993)
  - Bernie Magruder and the Bus Station Blow-Up (1996)
  - Bernie Magruder and the Parachute Peril (1999)
  - Bernie Magruder and the Pirate's Treasure (1999)
  - Bernie Magruder and the Case of the Big Stink (2001)
  - Bernie Magruder & the Bats in the Belfry (2003)
- York Trilogy
  - Shadows on the Wall (1980)
  - Faces in the Water (1981)
  - Footprints at the Window (1981)
- Picture books
  - A New Year's Surprise: Iran (1967) illustrated by Jack Endewelt
  - Meet Murdock (1969)
  - How Lazy Can You Get? (1979)
  - All Because I'm Older (1981)
  - The Boy with the Helium Head (1982)
  - Old Sadie and the Christmas Bear (1984)
  - The Baby, the Bed, and the Rose (1987)
  - Keeping a Christmas Secret (1989)
  - King of the Playground (1991)
  - Ducks Disappearing (1996)
  - I Can't Take You Anywhere! (1997)
  - Sweet Strawberries (1999)
  - Roxie and the Hooligans (2006)
  - Cuckoo Feathers (2006)
  - Emily's Fortune (2010)
  - Emily and Jackson: Hiding Out (2012)
  - Roxie and the Hooligans at Buzzard's Roost (2018)
- The Galloping Goat (1961)
- What the Gulls Were Singing (1967)
- To Walk the Sky Path (1973)
- Crazy Love: An Autobiographical Account of Marriage and Madness (1977)
- Eddie, Incorporated (1980)
- Night Cry (1984)
- The Keeper (1986)
- Beetles, Lightly Toasted (1987)
- Walker's Crossing (1987)
- The Year of the Gopher (1987)
- The Fear Place (1994)
- Being Danny's Dog (1995)
- Ice (1995)
- Danny's Desert Rats (1998)
- Sang Spell (1998)
- Jade Green: A Ghost Story (1999)
- How I Came to Be a Writer (2001)
- Faith, Hope, and Ivy June (2009)
- Going Where It's Dark (2016)
