= Frank Shaver Allen =

American architect

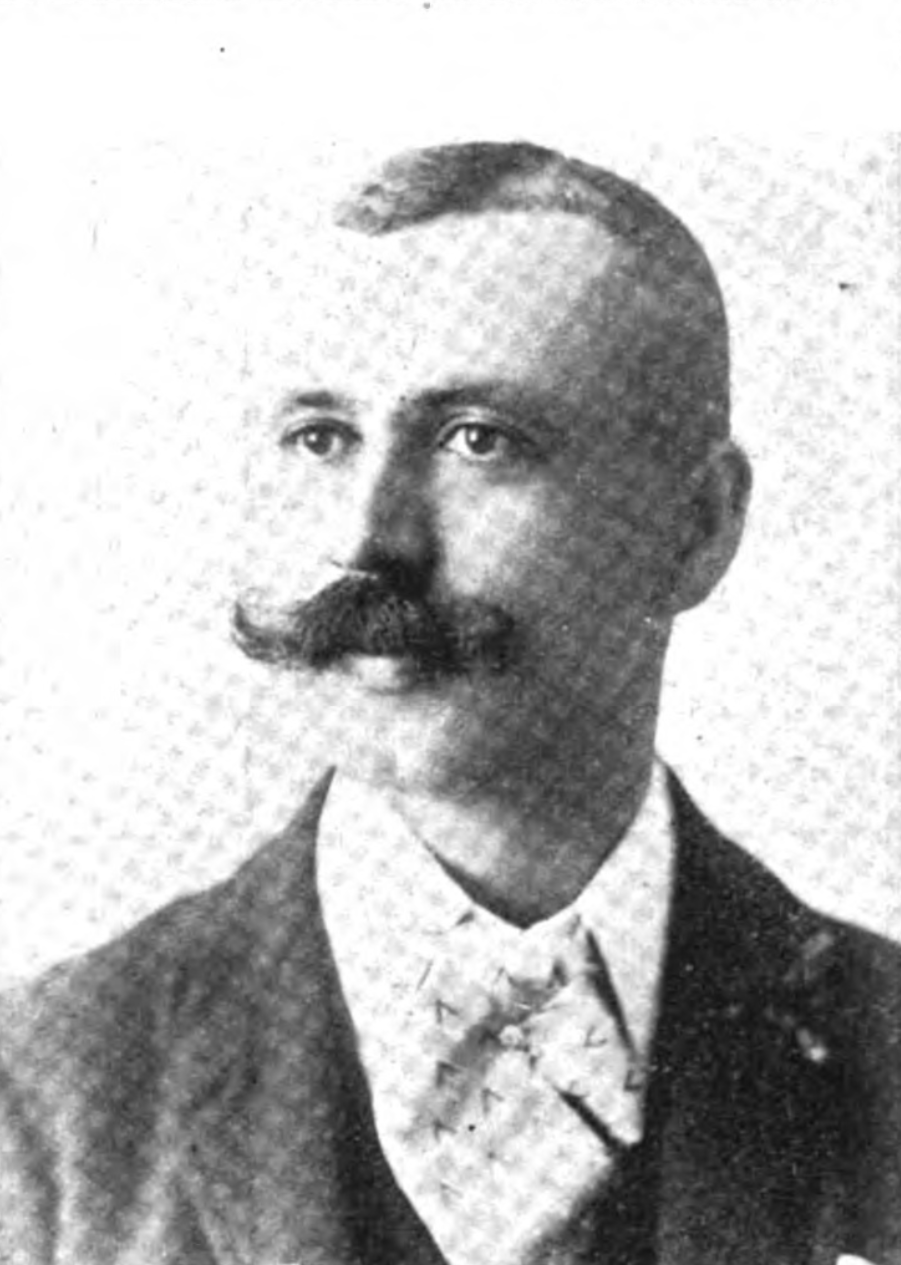
- F. S. Allen, 1895
- Born: 1860; Galesburg, Illinois, US
- Died: August 26, 1930; California, US
- Occupation: Architect

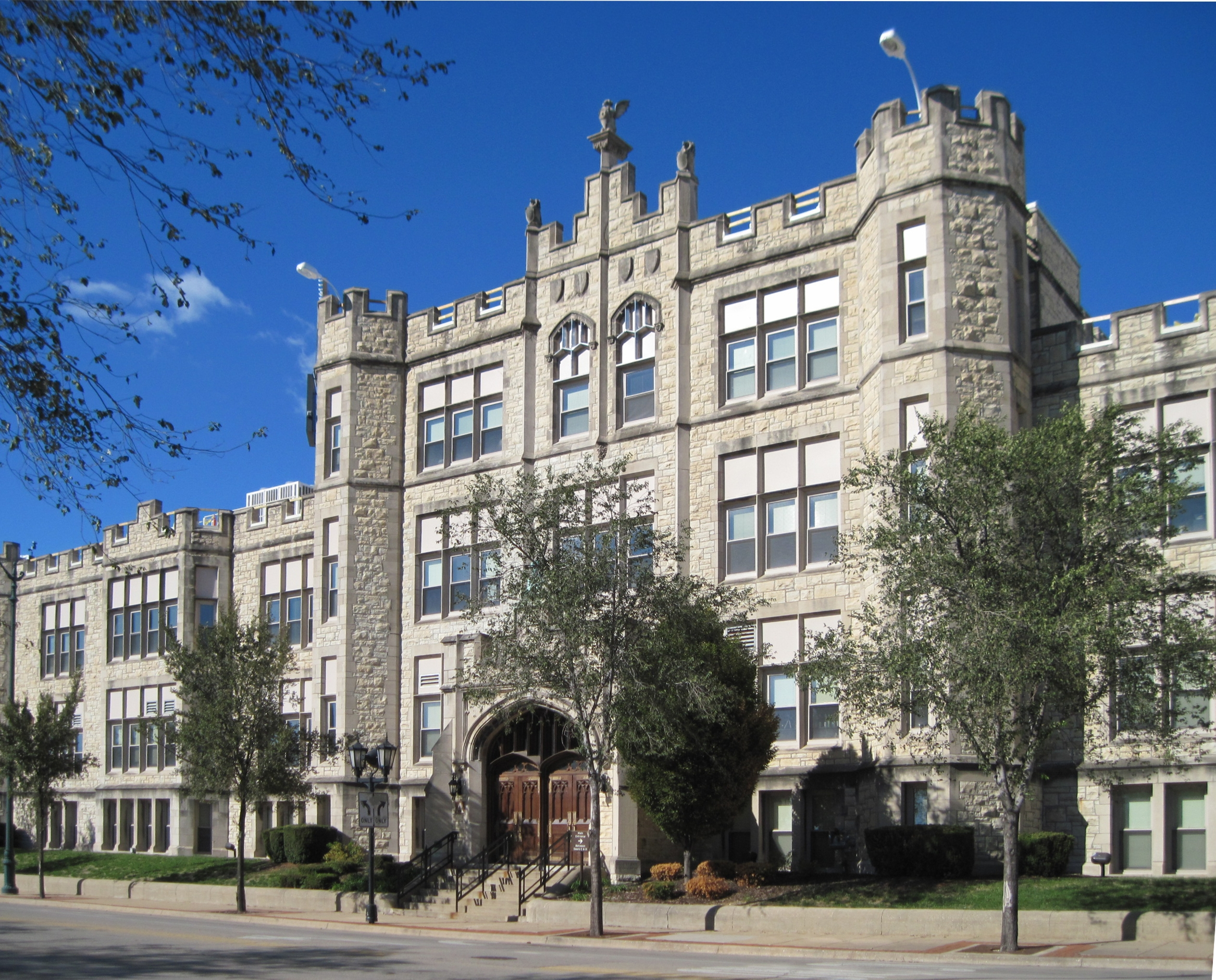
Joliet Township High School, 1901

Frank Shaver Allen (1860–1930), usually known as F. S. Allen was a significant Joliet, Illinois-based American architect noted for his Richardsonian Romanesque school designs.

== Early life and career ==
Frank Shaver Allen was born in 1860 in Galesburg, Illinois. He seems to have received some training in Chicago. By 1880, he was practicing architecture in Streator, Illinois. In 1886, Allen formed a partnership with John H. Coxhead, the firm being Allen & Coxhead. The partnership was dissolved the following year when Coxhead relocated to St. Paul, Minnesota. Following the dissolution of this partnership Allen moved to Joliet, where he did much of his best-known work.

In 1893, an exhibit of his work in school architecture at the World's Columbian Exposition received an award from the exposition commission, which led to significant expansion of his practice.

After being commissioned for work in California, he moved to Los Angeles in 1904 with his family, settling in Pasadena. He originally maintained his practice from Pasadena, but moved it to Los Angeles in 1907.

Allen was also an Egyptologist.

== Alleged kidnapping incident, retirement and death ==
In 1910, Allen was arrested for having an Altadena boy in his Los Angeles hotel room. The Los Angeles Times wrote that: "The boy, in whose company he was when arrested, is the same who was reported missing some time ago. No trace of him could be found by the police until he walked into his home in Altadena with the explanation that he had been in San Francisco with Allen. The matter was reported to the District Attorney's office, and an investigation was begun which resulted in last night's arrests. Allen is one of the most prominent architects in Southern California. He has been reckoned as a leader in his profession in this end of the State, and has occupied a high position in society. His family is of the most exclusive in the fashionable circles of Pasadena and Altadena." By early the next year, the felony charge was dropped. The Los Angeles Times reported that "The felony charge against F. S. Allen, a Pasadena architect, was ordered dismissed on motion of Deputy District Attorney Harry Alexander, on the ground it would be impossible to secure sufficient evidence to convict Allen."

Though other details of this incident are not known, it likely hastened the end of Allen's architectural career, who retired in 1915. He later operated a music store. He died in California on August 26, 1930.

== Legacy ==
Allen was responsible for a number of buildings that have been listed on the United States National Register of Historic Places.

== Architectural works ==
Year	Building	Address	City	State	Notes	Image	Reference
1885	Christ Episcopal Church	75 W Van Buren St	Joliet	Illinois	Listed on the National Register of Historic Places in 1982, but destroyed by fire in 2006.		
1890	Kenosha High School (former)	913 57th St	Kenosha	Wisconsin	Demolished.		
1892	Sioux City Central High School (former)	610 13th St	Sioux City	Iowa	Listed on the National Register of Historic Places in 1974.		
1895	East St. Louis High School (former)	501 N 10th St	East St. Louis	Illinois	Demolished.		
1895	Washington School	818 W Lorain St	Appleton	Wisconsin	Listed on the National Register of Historic Places in 1984.		
1898	Trenton High School	Chestnut and Hamilton Aves	Trenton	New Jersey	Demolished.		
1901	Joliet Township High School	201 E Jefferson St	Joliet	Illinois	Listed on the National Register of Historic Places in 1982.		
1906	San Diego High School	1405 Park Blvd	San Diego	California	Demolished in 1975.		
1907	San Jose High School	E San Fernando and S 7th St	San Jose	California	Demolished.		
