= Randall Kleck =

American martial artist

Randall Kleck (born c. 1950) is an American martial artist and three time world champion. In a martial arts career spanning over 40 years he has been a student, competitor, judge, instructor, and author.

== Martial arts competition ==
Kleck is best known as a martial arts competitor. He won two world titles from the Martial Arts Fighting Federation and an amateur world title from the International San Da Federation. He has title belts from kickboxing, sanda, and Muay Thai and won numerous national and regional titles in sport karate. He was ranked #1 nationally by the National Blackbelt League (NBL) in point fighting and among the world's top competitors in forms, fighting, and weapons by the North American Sport Karate Association (NASKA). NASKA ranked him #2 in the world in fighting, #4 in weapons, and #7 in forms. Kleck qualified to be a member of U.S. teams and fought in multiple countries against fighters from all over the world. In his 50s he was still competing successfully in Muay Thai and sanda, as well as winning tournaments in adult continuous sparring.

Besides being a student of Muay Thai, wrestling, boxing, and Shotokan karate, Kleck has also served as a coach and tournament volunteer. He has judged at major NASKA, NBL, and World Association of Kickboxing Organizations (WAKO) events and is a certified judge for the World Sanda League.

Kleck's efforts have been recognized by a number of organizations. Among the organizations that have honored him are the World Karate Union Hall of Fame (Lifetime Achievement Award), Action Martial Arts Magazine (Hall of Honor), WAKO-USA (for coaching kickboxing), the American Freestyle Karate Association (Hall of Fame), and the World Kung Fu Masters Association.

== Personal ==
Kleck is an ordained elder and deacon at Laurel Presbyterian Church and, according to one ratings website, is regarded as a helpful instructor of mathematics at Howard Community College.

Kleck has B.S. and M.S. degrees in mathematics from Michigan Technological University. He also writes the BLACK BELT INVESTMENT LETTER, an investment publication whose model portfolios have greatly outperformed the market. Kleck also coached basketball at the Laurel Boys & Girls Club for many years.
