= Joliet West High School =

Location
- 401 North Larkin Avenue; Joliet, Illinois 60435; United States; 41°31′45″N 88°7′33″W

Information
- Type: Public secondary
- Established: 1924
- School district: Joliet Township High School District 204
- Superintendent: Dr. Karla Guesman
- Principal: Tecara Parker
- Teaching staff: 167.70 (FTE)
- Grades: 9–12
- Enrollment: 3,451 (2024–2025)
- Student to teacher ratio: 20.58
- Campus: Suburban
- Colors: Black; Gold; White
- Mascot: Tiger
- Newspaper: Tiger Tales
- Yearbook: Alpha Omega
- Website: School website

Joliet West High School, along with Joliet Central, comprise Joliet Township High School District 204 in Joliet, Illinois. West's mascot is the Tiger.

== Construction and expansion ==
Construction of the school began in 1963, with the first classes held in September 1964. It has undergone six additions since. The first, completed in the early 1980s, added a bookstore to the cafeteria, additional space around the maintenance area, a multi-purpose room by the gymnasiums (primarily used for dance and wrestling), six additional classrooms, and a greenhouse. That greenhouse was later torn down.

The second and third additions were completed as two consecutive projects, adding several additional classrooms, a new band room, cafeteria, conference room, dean's offices, and student commons area. The first phase broke ground on November 4, 2001, and was completed the following school year. The second phase began during the 2002–03 year and was open for fall 2003 classes.

A field house was built in late 2007, and additional housing science classes was constructed in 2011.

In 2017, construction began on another smaller section of the building adding a Police Liaison Office, a conference room, and a security entrance. This project would be completed in Spring 2018. The project also added another connection from the main building to the fine-arts building, decreasing hallway traffic congestion.

== Separation of schools ==
During the 2008 - 2009 school year, Central and West began to again divide the schools' athletic programs, allowing the West mascot to become the Tiger once again, leaving Central as the Steelmen. The split began with Joliet's freshman football team dividing. As of the 2010 - 2011 school year, Joliet Central and Joliet West have their own, entirely independent sports programs.

== Notable alumni ==
- Charlie Adams, drummer/percussionist (Chameleon, Yanni)
- John Barrowman, television and Broadway actor (Doctor Who, Torchwood)
- Jimmy Chamberlin, drummer (The Smashing Pumpkins)
- Adrianne Curry - model, TV personality
- Andy Dick - actor-comedian (The Andy Dick Show)
- Jeremy Fears Jr., college basketball player for the Michigan State Spartans
- Janina Gavankar - actress, musician (The L Word, True Blood)
- Randall Kleck - martial artist
- Justus McNair - college basketball player for the Valparaiso Beacons
- Eric Parker - NFL player for San Diego Chargers
- Steve Parris - pitcher for four MLB teams
- Doug Pinnick - musician, King's X
- Anthony Rapp - actor (Rent)
