= The Witch Saga =

Fantasy novel series by Phyllis Reynolds Naylor

The Witch Saga is a 6-part fantasy novel series by author Phyllis Reynolds Naylor. The books deal with supernatural forces, specifically witchcraft. Witch's Sister, the first book in the series, was adapted into an episode of the television series, Big Blue Marble.

== Characters ==
- Lynn Morley is an eleven-year-old living in small town Indiana. She is considered to be a "normal" child, and thus her fear of and belief in the supernatural is considered unusual by her parents. Despite suspecting Mrs. Tuggle of witchcraft, Lynn confronts the old woman on many occasions, fearing to do otherwise could mean harm for her family and friends.
- Marjorie "Mouse" Beasely is Lynn Morley's best friend, and accompanies her throughout the series. Marjorie's parents have recently separated, causing her to feel very insecure, and thus making her vulnerable towards Mrs. Tuggle when she offers maternal guidance.
- Mrs. Elnora Tuggle is an elderly woman, and neighbor to Lynn and Marjorie. She is originally from England, immigrating to Indiana as a young bride, where she pursued her witchcraft quietly for many years. However, when the town is voting to dig up the old cemetery where her brother is buried, the old woman takes a great interest in forming a coven, enlisting the assistance of Lynn's various friends and family members. It is believed by Lynn and Marjorie that Mrs. Tuggle's brother didn't drown, as she claims, but was murdered by the old woman so he could be bodily transformed into an animal to do her bidding. At the end of the third novel, the witch's house is hit by lightning and burns down, Mrs. Tuggle still inside of it. Her spirit lives on however, through her glass eye which did not perish in the flames, and possesses Lynn, almost causing her to commit suicide. It is later revealed that Mrs. Tuggle did not die in the fire, as she returns in the final novel, adapting the alias of Elnora's younger sister, "Greta Gullone". Lynn, Marjorie, their families and friends confront Mrs. Gullone at her house on a dark November night, combining their energy into transforming the old woman into an innocent kitten, which Marjorie later adopts.

== Books ==
In Witch's Sister (1975), 11-year-old Lynn Morley suspects her older sister, Judith, of witchcraft after a series of odd and unexplainable happenings, such as conjuring up a boy from the local creek. Lynn and her friend, Marjorie "Mouse" Beasley, soon realize that Judith is under the influence of an eccentric old woman, who is developing a plan to murder the girls' five-year-old brother, Stevie.

In Witch Water (1977), Lynn Morley's best friend, Marjorie "Mouse" Beasley, becomes prey to her eccentric, elderly, neighbor, the morbid Mrs. Tuggle, after the separation of her parents. Lynn must stop the old woman from luring her friend into her coven of witches.

In The Witch Herself (1979), Lynn Morley's mother, Sylvia, becomes vulnerable to Mrs. Tuggle's witchcraft after renting a writing studio from her. Lynn confronts the old woman in a last-ditch effort to save her family.

In The Witch's Eye (1990), Lynn Morley's life seems to be returning to normal after Mrs. Tuggle's death, that is until her younger brother discovers the witch's glass eye among the ashes of her house. The eye controls anyone who has it in their possession, including Lynn herself.

In Witch Weed (1991), an odd crop of weeds begin growing in the field behind Lynn Morley's house, right around the area where Mouse threw Mrs. Tuggle's glass eye.

In The Witch Returns (1992), an old woman moves into Mrs. Tuggle's newly re-constructed house, and she bears a striking resemblance to the former inhabitant. Lynn Morley fears that the witch may have returned to haunt their sleepy, Indiana town. Lynn's entire family must come together in order to combat the evil.
