= Alice (novel series) =

Young adult book series by Phyllis Reynolds Naylor

The Alice series is a young adult book series written by Phyllis Reynolds Naylor, consisting of 25 books and three prequels, and it has been frequently challenged, as documented in the American Library Association's lists of the 100 most frequently challenged books from 1990 to 2019. The main character is Alice McKinley, and the Alice series covers her development through adolescence and puberty to the final book, Now I'll Tell You Everything, where Alice turns 60 years old. Through intimate relationships, jobs, disastrous accidents, and accidental parental meetings, the journey from a child into a grown woman is narrated in the Alice series. Important and notable characters are Alice's three best friends, Pamela, Gwen, Elizabeth; her first love, Patrick; her aunt, Sally; her brother, Lester; and her father. Dating, sex, friendship, familial matters, religion, and homosexuality are some of the controversial themes that Phyllis Reynolds Naylor uses to narrate the life story of Alice McKinley.

== Background ==
Phyllis Reynolds Naylor was born in 1933 in Anderson, Indiana. Naylor has written over 125 adult and young-adult novels, 28 of them in the Alice novel series. Naylor was awarded the Edgar Allan Poe Award in 1984 by the Mystery Writers of America for Night Cry. In 1992, Naylor won the Newbery Medal for Shiloh.

Phyllis Reynolds Naylor was raised by both her parents, Eugene and Lura Reynolds, who fostered a conservative and religious upbringing. As a teenager, Naylor wrote for her Church paper and certain school celebrations. Naylor later attended and graduated from Joliet Junior College in 1953. During her first marriage, Naylor worked for the Board of Education's philosophy office in Rockville, Maryland, and for the Montgomery County Education Association. After her divorce, Naylor achieved a B.A. in psychology from American University in 1963. Naylor considered a Ph.D. in the psychology field, but redirected her career path since she was more interested in becoming a professional writer.

The foundation for the Alice series, The Agony of Alice, was originally planned as a novel with no intentions for it to be developed into a series. In an interview with Elizabeth Devereaux in 2002, Naylor said: "I just wanted to write about a motherless girl looking for a role model who finds it not in the most beautiful teacher at school, the one she had hoped to get, but in the homeliest". Then, as she explains in the interview, Naylor started reflecting on her own personal moments, which became an inspiration for a series of books based on the original Alice character.

== The Alice series ==
- The Agony of Alice (September 1, 1985) – 6th Grade: Alice moves with her father and brother to Silver Spring, Maryland. The void of her mother, who died of cancer, is heightened through Alice's desire to have a woman-figure to help guide her through adolescence and puberty.
- Alice in Rapture, Sort of (March 31, 1989) – Summer before 7th Grade: The summer of the first boyfriend where Alice, Pamela, and Elizabeth spend summer together with respective boyfriends.
- Reluctantly Alice (March 30, 1991) – Fall of 7th Grade: Alice tries to survive seventh grade. She makes it her goal to be liked by everyone while she deals with Denise Whitlock, the school bully.
- All but Alice (April 30, 1992) – Winter of 7th Grade: Alice deals with the choice of popularity [gets to be one of The Famous Eight/Beautiful People] or being herself. She learns more about true friendship and following her heart.
- Alice in April (April 30, 1993) – Spring of 7th Grade: Alice tries to become "Woman of the House", just like how Aunt Sally says she is becoming.
- Alice In-Between (March 1, 1994) – End of 7th Grade: Alice turns thirteen and copes between girlhood and womanhood. She gets to take a trip to Chicago with Elizabeth and Pamela to visit Aunt Sally.
- Alice the Brave (May 1, 1995) – Summer before 8th Grade: Alice is afraid that her friends will notice her fear of deep water.
- Alice in Lace (March 1, 1996) – Beginning of 8th Grade: Alice and Patrick pretend to be married as part of a school project for their health class.
- Outrageously Alice (May 1, 1997) – Fall of 8th Grade: Alice is tired of the monotony of life and wants outrageous things to happen to her. She joins clubs and dyes her hair green, much to her father's dismay.
- Achingly Alice (June 1, 1998) – Winter of 8th Grade: Alice decides she needs to set priorities in life and make things happen. She also develops a crush on Sam, the boy in her camera club.
- Alice on the Outside (June 1, 1999) – Spring of 8th Grade: Alice explores the feeling of being excluded and marginalized. She also learns an unsettling truth about a friend.
- The Grooming of Alice (May 1, 2000) – Summer before 9th Grade: Alice, Pamela, and Elizabeth spend the entire summer trying to get perfect bodies for ninth grade.
- Alice Alone (May 1, 2001) – First semester of 9th Grade: Alice breaks up with Patrick after a girl in their grade, Penny, took interest in him. She struggles with the idea of being single and learns to love herself even without a boyfriend.
- Simply Alice (May 1, 2002) – Second semester of 9th Grade: Pamela and Elizabeth feel left out in Alice's life as she begins to branch out on her own with new activities and new friends. Alice also handles a secret email admirer.
- Patiently Alice (May 1, 2003) – Summer before 10th Grade: Alice, Pamela, Elizabeth and Gwen volunteer to be counselors together at a camp for troubled kids.
- Including Alice (May 1, 2004) – First semester of 10th Grade: Ben and Sylvia finally get married and Alice feels left out with all the new changes happening around in the house. Alice also contemplates the value of social customs.
- Alice on Her Way (June 1, 2005) – Second semester of 10th Grade: Alice's sixteenth birthday is coming up and she tries to get her driver's license. Alice also has a new boyfriend and learns more about relationships, intimacy, and experiences a new stimulating adventure through a class trip to New York.
- Alice in the Know (June 1, 2006) – Summer before 11th Grade: Alice works in a local departmental store for the summer, goes for a trip to the beach with Elizabeth and Pamela, and a good friend becomes seriously ill.
- Dangerously Alice (May 8, 2007) – First semester of 11th grade: Alice is determined to defy the perception of her of being "Miss Goody Two-shoes", so she becomes rebellious by sneaking out and dating Tony. Alice's attitude towards life is changed when her friend takes part in a drunk-driving crash.
- Almost Alice (June 18, 2008) – Second semester of 11th grade: Alice is excited about attending prom and worries that the invite from Patrick will accidentally revive their late relationship. Pamela has a big decision to make.
- Intensely Alice (June 2, 2009) – The summer before 12th grade: Alice visits Patrick at his college at Chicago. A life changing incident brings the whole gang back together.
- Alice in Charge (June 2010) – First semester of senior year: Alice encounters a group of neo-Nazis disturbing the peace at her school. An encounter in the school hallway with a friend reveals that a new teacher is taking advantage of her.
- Incredibly Alice (May 2011) – Second semester of senior year: Alice is having mixed feelings about going away for college and deals with a series of unexpected news and life events.
- Alice on Board (May 2012) – The summer before college: Alice and her friends get a job on a Chesapeake Bay cruise ship before going off to college, working as maids and waitresses.
- Now I'll Tell You Everything (October 2013) – Chronicles of Alice from age 18 to 60.

== The Alice prequels ==
- Starting with Alice (September 1, 2002) – 3rd Grade: Alice tries to deal with being the new girl when she, her dad and Lester move after the store Alice's father works for transfers him to Takoma Park, Maryland.
- Alice in Blunderland (September 1, 2003) – 4th Grade: Alice feels as though she cannot escape her embarrassment.
- Lovingly Alice (September 1, 2004) – 5th Grade: Alice thinks that fifth grade is just one big joke.

== Characters ==
- Alice Kathleen McKinley (Long) is the protagonist and narrator of the series. She has strawberry blond hair, green eyes and freckles. She often refers to herself as an average girl during her pre-teen years and slowly builds up her confidence along the series through her various life journeys. Her mother, Marie, died of leukemia when she was five and Alice often feels as though she does not know how to "be a woman" due to the missing presence of a motherly figure. Her most prominent school activity is her stint as a roving reporter for her school newspaper in high school, The Edge, where she eventually got appointed as features editor during her final semester in junior year and all through senior year. Some of the other clubs/school activities that she has joined were the Earring club, Camera club, Drama club as a stage crew (she plays the main role in her senior year play as Anne in Cheaper by the Dozen), Gay/Straight Alliance and Student Jury. Alice wants to be a psychiatrist, psychologist or school counselor as mentioned in several books. She decides to be a school guidance counselor during her 11th grade and several experiences in her college years solidify commitment to counseling. She works as a school counselor in Montgomery County Middle School after attaining her master's and became supervisor for all the middle school counselors by her early thirties. In the final book of the series, Alice marries her long time boyfriend, Patrick, after they reunite in the airport. They have two children, Patricia Marie and Tyler.
- Benjamin McKinley is Alice's father and usually the person for Alice to turn to for advice. He works as a music instructor for the Melody Inn in Chicago and was promoted to manager of the Melody Inn in Silver Spring (the reason they move from Takoma Park). He believes in long/slow courtship and was portrayed as a "shy" kind of person up to college. He is torn by the death of his late wife but manages to find confidence to date again later on and marries Sylvia Summers, Alice's 7th grade English teacher. According to Sylvia, he is the kindest man that she has ever known, being truly considerate and patient to have waited for her when she went to England for a year and had to postpone the wedding when her sister fell sick. He died in his late eighties from a massive coronary and cremated by the family according to his wishes.
- Lester McKinley is Alice's brother. They have a seven-year age difference but Alice feels very close to him. He is considered very handsome and most of Alice's friends have a crush on him. He usually shies away from most of Alice's questions or answers them sarcastically. During most of the series, Lester is studying philosophy minoring in psychology, switching from a business major. He graduates with his master's degree in Alice in Charge on his 25th birthday. He works as an assistant director for the Basswood Lodge and Convention Center and then as a head personnel at George Mason University by the time he is 46. Lester has a number of girlfriends, having dated 14 girls by book number 5, All but Alice. He juggled two girlfriends (Crystal Harkins and Marilyn Rawley) for the first half of the series. He finally marries Stacy Houghton in the final book of the series and becomes a father to triplets at the age of 47. He calls the kids the "Tumultuous T".
- Elizabeth Price is one of Alice's three best friends throughout the whole series of the book. They met the first day Alice moves across the street in Silver Spring. She is a devout Catholic, has strong opinions about sex and is quite philosophical. Alice, Pamela and Gwen are always understanding of her feelings. She loosens up as she gets older though. Her friends describe her as beautiful because of her long dark hair, creamy skin and thick eyelashes. Elizabeth's first serious boyfriend is Ross Mueller whom she met during their summer job after 9th grade as assistant counselors in Camp Overlook. She started liking one of their friends, Keeno, during the summer before their senior year and they dated till the end of high school. In the final book of the series, Elizabeth falls for and marries Moses, a delightful gentleman she met on an Amtrak trip to California with Alice and Pamela. She gives birth to 3 daughters after a miscarriage during her first pregnancy. She teaches at a private school in Virginia while pursuing her master's and continues teaching after becoming a mother.
- Pamela Jones is also one of Alice's three best friends. She is blond and met Alice met in 6th grade. She bounces between two boys, Brian Brewster and Mark Steidmeister, for several books. Later, she gets involved with a boy named Tim and refers him as one of the nicest guy she ever dated. She sometimes says things about adulthood and sex that can shock Elizabeth and, at times, Alice. She has the most difficult home life due to her parents' messy separation and divorce. She is insightful and wild compared to the rest of the group when it comes to boys. In Almost Alice, she gets pregnant the period she was with Tim, but miscarries after they broke up due to the pregnancy scare. In the final book of the series, Pamela stays single throughout her life with occasional relationships along the way (except for a 10-year relationship at one point) until she marries William Harris relatively late in life. Bill is a very nice guy who treats Pamela like a queen. The couple choose to be childfree but they do have dogs.
- Gwen Wheeler is a smart, level-headed girl and one of Alice's three best friends. She is one of the African Americans in the series and meets Alice and her friends in 8th grade. She becomes one of Alice's best friends by sophomore year and has always tutored Alice with her difficult courses, especially algebra. She wants to go into medicine since 10th grade and was sure of the decision when their friend, Molly, was diagnosed with cancer. She was the first "person of color" who manages to pass the threshold of the Jones' house, where Pamela's father forbid anyone other than a white American to enter the house. She attends medical school with the aid of scholarship and eventually becomes a gynecologist practicing in Baltimore, Maryland. She marries her college sweetheart, Charlie, and has two sons. She is there for Alice the most during her cancer ordeal in her forties.
- Patrick Long is Alice's first serious boyfriend. He is a smart redhead who partook in an accelerated program to graduate high school in three years, instead of four. Patrick plays the drums in the school band and was in several other clubs/activities like the school newspaper, debate team, track team and student council (serving as the vice president). He acts older than his age and is viewed as self-sufficient. He and Alice began dating in 6th grade but she ended their relationship the summer before 7th as she was not ready for anything more yet. They agreed to be "special friends" and got back together the summer after 7th grade. During the 8th grade semi-formal, Patrick fell sick from mono but promises Alice to bring her to his senior prom. In the first year of high school, they broke up after Penny, a new girl in their grade, showed interest in him. They remain as friends and got back together in late high school when Patrick asks her to his senior prom. He went to college a year early in Chicago and they continue a long-distance relationship. When Patrick decides to study abroad in Spain during Alice's freshman year in college, their relationship slowly goes downhill and he sends her a letter suggesting they do not tie each other down, admitting his attraction to other women. He then serves in the Peace Corps for 2 years. After he finishes serving the Peace Corps, he and Alice reunite at the O'Hare airport. The two rekindle their relationship and, eventually, marry and have two children. Patrick achieved career success working for IBM with numerous promotions over the years. He continued with part-time consulting work for IBM in Japan few times a year in his 60s, with Alice accompanying him.
- Aunt Sally is Alice's aunt, sister to her deceased mother. She lives in Chicago with her husband, Milt. Alice sometimes mistakes her memories of her mother with memories of Aunt Sally as she took care of the family in Chicago for a few period of time after Marie (Alice's mom) died. Aunt Sally is often useful to Alice when she needed advice but sometimes with personal questions, she asks Aunt Sally's daughter, Carol, instead. She calls the family once a week to check up on them as a promise to Marie to look after the family but the phone calls slows down eventually when Sylvia married Alice's father. She died at the age of 71.
- Sylvia Summers begins as Alice's seventh-grade language-arts teacher whom Alice adores. Alice wants her father and Sylvia to date, so she invites her to a Christmas choral performance, the Messiah Sing-Along, at a local church with her father and without his knowledge. They started dating soon thereafter and got engaged when she was in England where she accepted a teacher exchange position. Sylvia eventually marries Alice's dad when she comes back from England and moves into the family house. Their relationship as stepmother and stepdaughter got off on a rocky start where Alice felt that they were too polite with each other. A night where Alice attended a party which resulted into a serious car crash turned things around when Sylvia had a serious talk with her on how worried her dad has been that fateful night. They talked everything out and made efforts to communicate more effectively with each other afterwards and maintained a good relationship even after her dad's passing.
- Carol is Alice's cousin, the only daughter to Aunt Sally. She is more spontaneous and easy-going compared to her mother and Alice finds her easier to approach for more personal question which mostly involves sex. They share a lot of conversations mostly when Carol comes to visit for the holidays or conferences in Silver Spring. She is divorced from a sailor and dates a nice fellow, Lawrence (Larry) in Alice in The Know and they were married the summer before Alice's senior year. She drops by occasionally during holiday or celebratory occasions and both share a bonding experience when Aunt Sally dies where they discover relics from their mother's infancy.
- Mrs. Plotkin is Alice's 6th grade teacher who helps her learn that it is what's on the inside that counts. She is the first teacher that Alice had ever felt close with. They met again in the hospital where Alice does volunteer work during the summer of 7th grade. She was suffering from cardiac disorders, which claimed her life during one of the morning Alice was there for work. Alice attended her memorial service and shared her memories of Mrs. Plotkin throughout the years they've known each other. Her death was one of the loss that Alice had to cope with difficulty, after the passing of her mother.
- Mark Steidmester is one of Alice's classmates. They met in 6th grade when he was dating Pamela Jones. Alice and her friends makes it a tradition to hang out in his family's pool over every summer until the group breaks up. Mark died when he was 16 from a car crash. Everyone attended his funeral where Patrick gave a memorial speech to represent all of their friends, referring to Mark as a "there for you" kind of friend. The group still drops by Mark's house after his death to check in on his parents from time to time, mostly during the holidays or when Patrick comes into town (after he goes off to college in Chicago).
- Brian Brewster is one of Alice's classmates since 7th grade. He's in the "pool gang" which Alice calls her and the group of friends who usually hangs out in the Stedmeister's pool during the summer. He used to date Pamela Jones the summer after sixth grade and then again in eighth grade. He disappears from the group after graduating from high school but reappears in the series at 60 years old during the opening of the time capsule where he's living in Canada and owns a sports franchise.
- Jill is one of Alice's friends from junior high. She is known for her popularity and attractive physical appearance. She dates Justin Collier all through high school and they were married in their senior year when she got pregnant (part of their plan to rebel against Justin's parents who constantly tries to keep them apart). They met again during the opening of the time capsule where she is divorced from Justin and is a talent scout in LA.
- Karen is also one of Alice's friends from junior high. She is Jill's best friend and is known as the gossip among their friends. She attends Penn State after graduating from high school and occasionally emails Pamela over the years. Alice met her again during the opening of the time capsule where she is working at a bank in Pittsburgh and is hardly recognizable, having put on so much weight.
- Sam Mayer is one of Alice's serious boyfriends whom she met in 8th grade. They dated during their sophomore year. Alice broke up with him after a few months of dating because she felt mollycoddled. They remained as good friends after parting and he works alongside Alice in the school newspaper as the photographer. Alice refers to him as a guy who's in love with love.
- Penny is one of Patrick's ex-girlfriends. She started to flirt with Patrick at the start of 9th grade when Alice and Patrick were still together. In Including Alice, Penny reaches out to Alice asking how long she's going to stay mad at her and they eventually became friends throughout the remaining series. Penny admits to Alice in Incredibly Alice that she always feels that she loses out to Alice (she never thought Patrick really liked her, calling her Alice on occasions). She moved to Delaware with her family after high school graduation and lost touch with the gang. Pamela eventually found out that she's married and is living in Tucson by the time the gang is in their late twenties.
- Keeno (Keene) is Brian Brewster's friend from St John's who got introduced to the pool gang one of the summers in Alice in the Know. He starts to hang out with the gang by the summer before Alice's senior year even when Brian is not around. He forms the Naked Carpenters with Mark dressing in briefs and work boots, playing instruments on the local metros which gains attention of local media coverage. He dated Elizabeth during her senior year and went on to attend a naval academy in Annapolis after graduating from high school.
- Molly Brennan is one of the stage crew member Alice met in Drama club. Everyone likes her due to her easy and lovable personality. She is a year older than Alice and they become closer during a class trip to New York and when she was diagnosed with cancer during Alice's junior year. Alice and her friends visited Molly frequently when she was battling cancer until she got into remission.
- Lori Haynes is a girl from Alice's eighth-grade English class and homeroom. She is Alice's first lesbian friend and came out to her the night she invited Alice over for a sleepover. She dated a girl named Leslie and was often ostracized by school bullies. Alice stood up for them mostly when she witnessed the bullying and they eventually joined a club called Gay/Straight Alliance. Alice lost touch with her in their twenties and in the last book of the series, Alice received a postcard from Lori about a hideaway B&B owned by her and Leslie. She and Leslie were married in Seattle where Leslie took her last name.
- Amy Sheldon is a girl who transfers from special ed class during Alice's sophomore year. She tries to become friends with Alice and her friends but got outcast-ed because of her strange personality and social awkwardness. Alice has helped her to increase her social skills and confidence in self by encouraging her to become a roving reporter for the school newspaper and giving out honest advises whenever she needs it. She may be autistic. Amy was also in the later books in 2011 (Alice in Charge) molested by a student teacher. The story was actually told by Alice herself.
- Marilyn Rawley was one of Lester's first serious girlfriend in Silver Spring. They dated on and off for a few years and officially remain as friends in The Grooming of Alice. She has long straight brown hair and brown eyes, plays the guitar and sing. She works for Alice's dad by running the Gift Shoppe and later gets hired as the assistant manager. She marries a man named Jack Roberts, a guitarist. In Incredibly Alice she gives birth to her first child, a daughter named Summer Hope.
- Crystal Harkins was Lester's second girlfriend in Silver Spring. She has short reddish hair, smooth pale skin and ample bosom. She dated Lester until Marilyn came back into his life and they dated on and off afterwards. She shows up in their house to announce her engagement to Peter Carey in Alice in Lace and still has lingering feelings for Lester even after the marriage. In Intensely Alice she finally understood that she should not reach out to Lester anymore and moves on.
- Rosalind Rodriquez is Alice's best friend from 3rd to 5th grade when she was living in Takoma Park. She resurface years later in Including Alice, where she meets Alice in the Melody Inn store in Silver Spring. They reunite and email each other often afterwards.
- Tony Osler is a senior whom Alice shares a brief romance with. He is the sports editor for the school newspaper and started to show interest in Alice in Alice on Her Way. He brings Alice to the Snow Ball during her junior year and they shared a couple of sexual intimacies from then on. Alice calls off the relationship after she gets the vibe that she is just another one of his "babes".
- Scott Lynch is a senior whom Alice had a crush on. He is the editor in chief for the school newspaper during Alice's junior year. The crush shortly ended after Alice invites him to the Sadie Hawkins dance and realizes that he does not feel a "spark" for her.

== Reception ==
=== Analysis ===
The Alice novel series, which includes 28 books, has 2.5 million copies in circulation. Naylor's ability to narrate Alice McKinley's life as she ages across 28 books is highlighted by Edie Ching, an instructor who specializes in children's literature at the University of Maryland, who remarks: "The fact that Phyllis could write a series in which her main character went from childhood to adulthood over time—and in each book was fully realized at that particular stage of her life—shows her depth and talent as a writer".

In 2003, the Alice novel series, according to the Baltimore Sun, was the most controversial novel series because of the illicit sexual content. The American Library Association's list from 2000 to 2009 states that the books in the Alice series were the second most frequently banned books in the decade, following the Harry Potter series. The series covers many controversial topics that are included in young-adult literature like masturbation, menstruation, and the evolution both physically and mentally of the main character. In The Grooming of Alice, Alice inspects her genitalia in a manner common to teaching the audience, most often a child, about sex. In the fourth book in the series, All But Alice, Alice, Lester, and her father converse about a song called "My Necrophiliac Lover"; school libraries in a Minnesota district banned the book. In Webb City, Missouri, multiple Alice books were removed from the shelves of school libraries in 2002 due to the use of homosexuality in the narrative.

=== Awards ===
The Alice series has received the following accolades:

- Alice in Agony: Dorothy Canfield Fisher Children's Book Award Nominee (1987)
- Reluctantly Alice: Dorothy Canfield Fisher Children's Book Award Nominee (1993)
- Alice the Brave: Dorothy Canfield Fisher Children's Book Award Nominee (1997)
- Outrageously Alice: Best Books for Young Adults (1998)
- Simply Alice: Amelia Bloomer List (2003)

=== Controversy ===
The Alice series has been the center of much controversy:

- Top 100 most frequently challenged books: 1990–1999
- Top 100 Banned/Challenged Books: 2000–2009
- Top 100 Most Banned and Challenged Books: 2010–2019
- Top 10 Most Banned and Challenged Books for 2001, 2002, 2003, 2006, and 2011
- In 2023 Alice the Brave was banned, in Clay County District Schools, Florida.
