= Joliet Central High School =

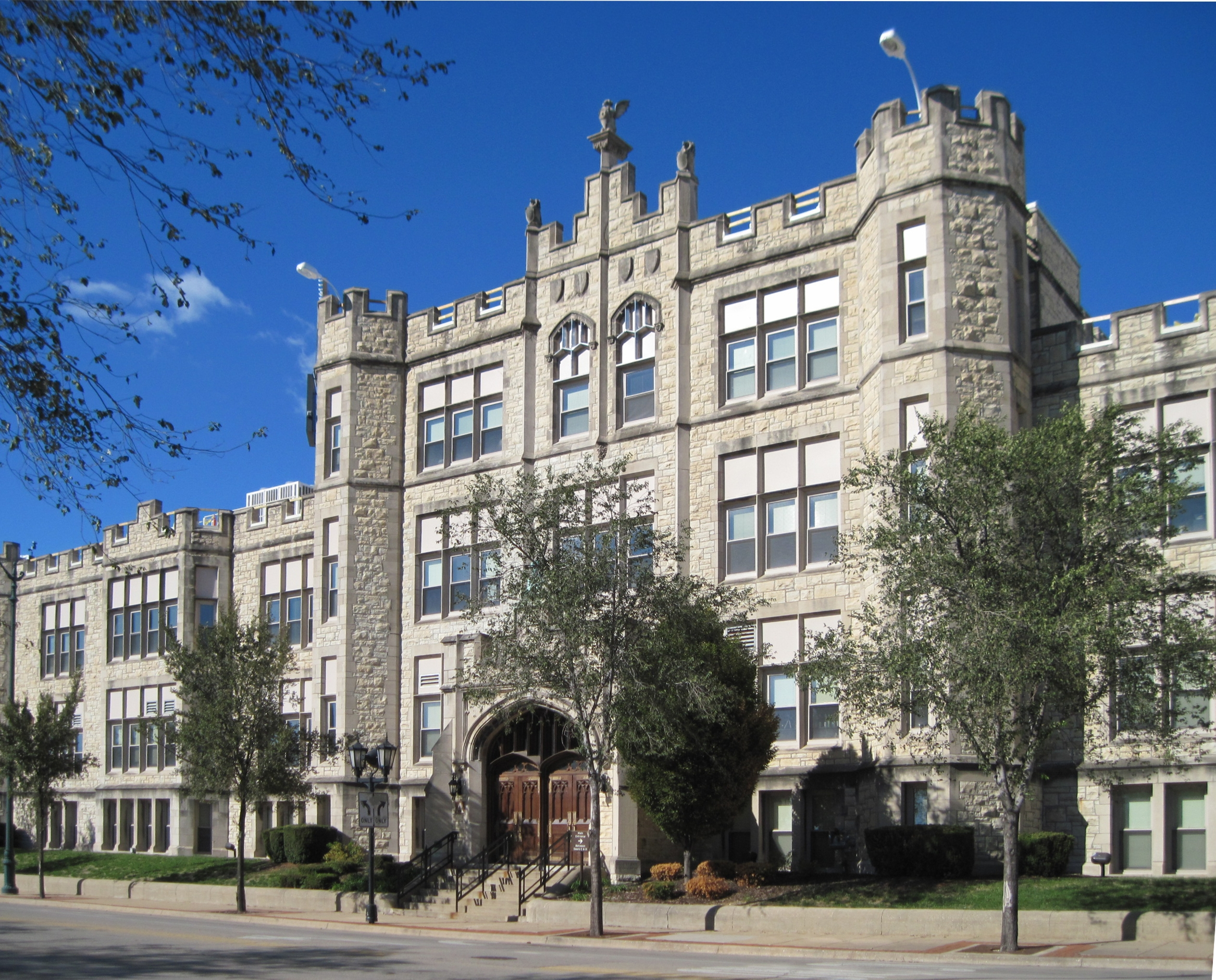

Location
- 201 East Jefferson Street; Joliet, Illinois 60432; United States

Information
- School type: public secondary
- Opened: 1901
- School district: Joliet Twp. HS 204
- Superintendent: Karla Guesman
- Principal: Shad Hallihan
- Teaching staff: 183.70 (FTE)
- Grades: 9–12
- Gender: coed
- Enrollment: 3,383 (2023–2024)
- Average class size: 18.8
- Student to teacher ratio: 18.42
- Campus type: urban
- Colors: royal blue gold
- Athletics conference: Southwest Prairie Conference
- Team name: Steelmen/Steelwomen
- Newspaper: JTC Journal
- Website: www.jths.org/central
- Joliet Township High School
- U.S. National Register of Historic Places
- Location within Illinois Location within the United States
- Location: 201 E. Jefferson St., Joliet, Illinois
- Coordinates: 41°31′31″N 88°04′29″W
- Area: 3.6 acres (1.5 ha)
- Built: 1901
- Built by: D.S. Burnham (1917, 1922, 1924, and 1931 additions)
- Architect: Frank Shaver Allen (1901 original)
- Architectural style: Collegiate Gothic
- NRHP reference No.: 82002604
- Added to NRHP: August 12, 1982

Joliet Central High School is a public secondary school located in Joliet, Illinois. Central is part of Joliet Township High Schools, along with Joliet West and Joliet East (now defunct). Before the opening of Joliet East and West, the school was called Joliet Township High School. In 1993, when Joliet Central and Joliet West combined many of their athletic and other competitive extracurricular programs, the combined program took the old "Joliet Township" name.

== Building ==
The original building was designed by architect Frank Shaver Allen in the "Collegiate Gothic" featuring arches, castellated walls, and towers. It was built in 1901 and expanded by the D. H. Burnham Company, in 1917, 1922, 1924, and 1931 which were built in similar style. It is built of locally quarried limestone. The building was placed on the National Register of Historic Places in 1982.

The school is four stories tall, two city blocks long, and includes four separate buildings. The campus underwent a moderate expansion during 2005 when the old shop building was knocked down and a new building was erected in its place. A catwalk connects the main building to the T&I building and allows students to cross sheltered from inclement weather. The facilities include a daycare center, a planetarium, one soccer field, four baseball fields, a 1/16-mile indoor track and a 1/4-mile track across the street to the east.

There is a historical display on the second floor near the South Entrance that is maintained by the Joliet Central Historical Society. Many archived items are kept in a vault; the display includes the original Steelman sculpture and conceptual models of it from the 1933 Chicago World's Fair. The Steelman was sculpted by Louise Lentz Woodruff and is positioned with its hands behind a male and female, symbolizing technology advancing humans. It is surrounded by the original relief panels representing the basic sciences: astronomy, mathematics, physics, chemistry, botany, zoology, medicine, and geology. It has long been considered good luck to rub the right knee of the male before any test or sporting events; therefore, the knee has been worn away and reconstituted over the years.

After finishing a new parking lot in 2007, Central began constructing a Field House over the parking lot. In October 2008, the Field House was completed.

In April 2016, Gilbane Building Company completed construction of a new 43,000 sq ft (4,000 m^{2}) addition. The new structure, designed by Wight & Co., features a three-story glass curtainwall facade that leads a student center and cafeteria that can seat up to 600 people for events.

== Athletics ==
In sports, the district had combined teams between Joliet West and Joliet Central that was collectively known as "Joliet Township." However, the schools separated and now have two athletics. The program is a member of the Southwest Prairie Conference (SWPC) and the Illinois High School Association (IHSA). In this combined form the Steelmen/Steelwomen name which continues to be used by Joliet Central when it competes alone, is used for the combined teams. Joliet Central is the headquarters for the combined athletic program.

The athletic department sponsors interscholastic teams for young men and women in basketball, bowling, cross country, golf, soccer, swimming and diving, tennis, track and field, and volleyball. Young men may compete in baseball, football, and wrestling, while young women may compete in badminton, cheerleading, and softball. While not sponsored by the IHSA, the school sponsors a poms team.

The following teams finished in the top four of their respective IHSA sponsored state championship tournament:

- Basketball (boys): State Champions (1936–37)
- Softball: State Champions (1999–2000)
- Track & Field (boys): State Champions (1915–16)
- Wrestling: State Champions (1984–85)
- Football: State Champions (1961–62); (1962–63)

During the 2008–2009 school year, Central and West began to separate their football programs, causing the West mascot to become the Tiger again, leaving Central as the Steelmen. The split began with Joliet's freshmen football team dividing. By the 2010–2011 school year, Joliet Central and Joliet West will have their own football teams. All of the other sports except golf have divided too.

== Band ==
In 1913, A.R. McAllister, a manual arts instructor who played the cornet, was asked to organize a band for Joliet Township High School. Mr. McAllister, who grew up on a farm in Jackson Township, bought a cornet at age 14 with profits he earned from selling his pig at the Will County Fair. He studied music under James H. Ward, director of Ward's Boy Band in Joliet. Prior to directing the JT band, McAllister organized the Trinity Girl's Band in 1905 and performed with local ensembles, including the Dellwood Park Band and Joliet Steelworkers Industrial Band.

Under Mr. McAllister's leadership, the band won state championships from 1924 to 1926 and national championships from 1926 to 1928. In their hometown, the band received permanent possession of the trophy in 1928 and was praised by John Philip Sousa (see photo below). The band was exempt to play at the 1929 contest in Denver, but performed as an exhibition group. In 1931, the band regained the national title.

In 1936, McAllister lead his young musicians through a week of nine performances at Radio City Music Hall where the band performed an Easter show with the Rockettes, playing for a total of 160,000 people. The band played for draftees, and was known as "the minute men" because they were always ready - day or night to perform for soldiers traveling through Joliet.

Mr. McAllister became a nationally recognized leader of the school band movement and was known as "the father of the high school band program." McAllister helped organize the National School Band Association in 1926. He was elected vice-president the same year before serving as president for 14 years. On Sept. 30, 1944, McAllister died at age 63.

The Joliet Township High School Band, later the Joliet Central Band, still continues today. It is one of the longest running band and one of the most successful band programs in the country. One of Joliet's nicknames is the "City of Champions." This nickname stems from the numerous state and national titles won by the Joliet Township High School and grade school bands over several decades.

== Notable alumni ==
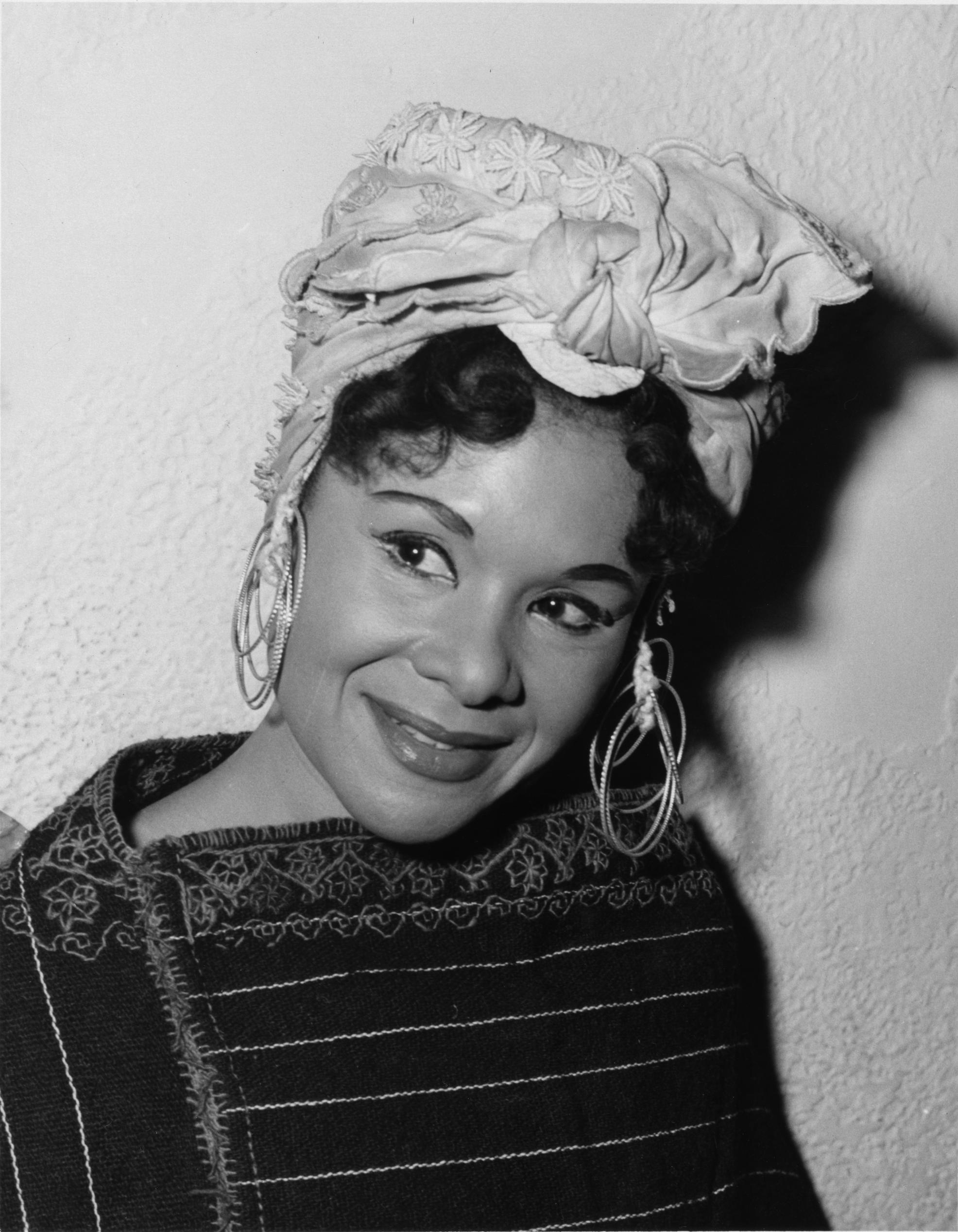
Katherine Dunham

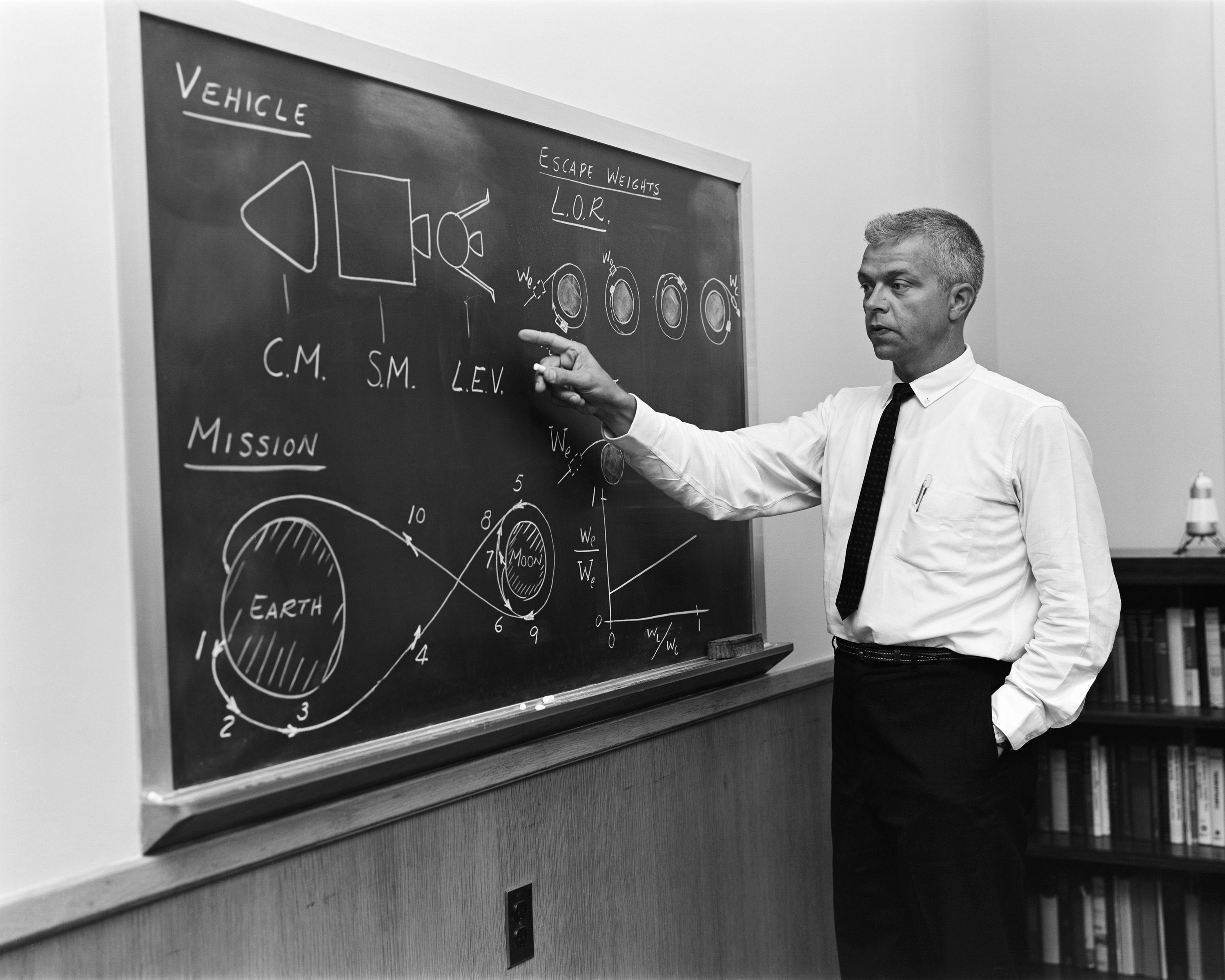
John Houbolt

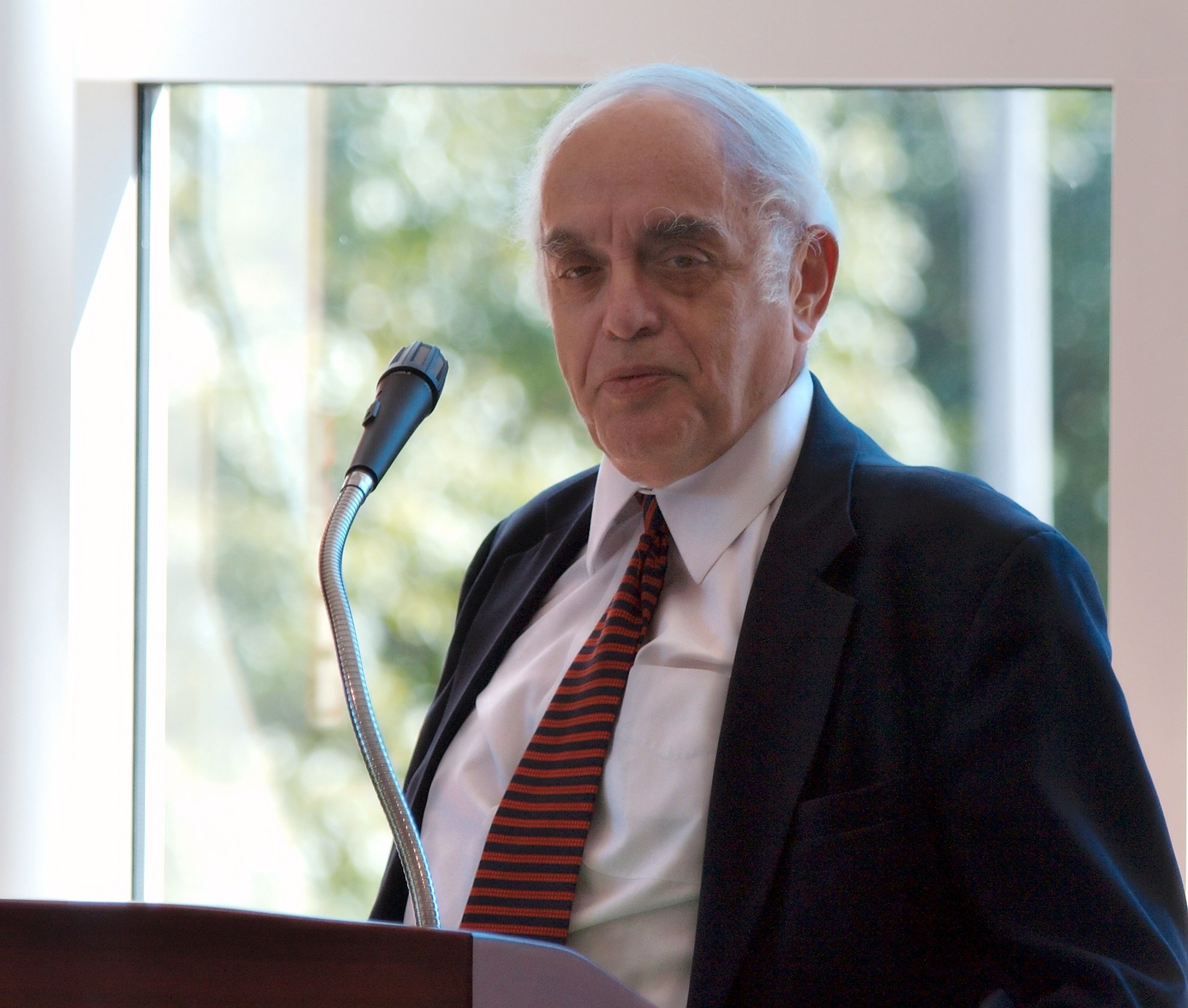
Robert Novak

- Jesse Barfield (1977) is a former Major League Baseball outfielder (1981–92), playing most of his career with the Toronto Blue Jays. He won two Gold Gloves and one Silver Slugger.
- Garland Buckeye, former MLB player (Washington Senators, Cleveland Indians, New York Giants).
- Larry Gura (1965) former MLB pitcher who played from 1970 to 1985 (Cubs, Royals, Yankees)
- Lois Delander (1931) was, while a student at the school, the first woman to win the Miss Illinois pageant. She then became Miss America 1927.
- Katherine Dunham (1926) was a dancer, choreographer, civil rights activist, teacher, and anthropologist who was a pioneer in African-American modern dance, dance ethnology. In 1983, she was awarded a Kennedy Center Honor.
- Merritt Giffin (1908) won a silver medal in the men's discus throw at the 1908 Summer Olympics.
- John D. Goeken is a telecommunications entrepreneur who founded MCI Inc., FTD Mercury Network, Airfone, and In-Flight Phone Corporation. His lawsuit against AT&T eventually led to its divestiture of its Bell company holdings.
- Kathryn Hays (1952) is an actress, perhaps best known for her role as Kim Sullivan Hughes on the soap opera As the World Turns (1972–2010).
- John Houbolt (1936) is a former aerospace engineer who fought for and developed the Lunar Orbit Rendezvous (LOR) plan for transporting astronauts to and from the Moon.
- Bill Jones (1976) retired basketball player who played his professional career in Australia, captaining the Adelaide 36ers to the 1986 National Basketball League championship. Jones was All-Conference and an All-State honorable mention while at Central.
- Morton Kondracke (1956) is a political journalist who has written independently and for such periodicals as Roll Call. He was also known for his appearances as a regular panelist on the long-running television show The McLaughlin Group.
- Harry Daniel Leinenweber is a U.S. federal judge (1985–present) serving on the bench of the United States District Court for the Northern District of Illinois.
- Jeff Monken (1985) is the head football coach at Army.
- Phyllis Reynolds Naylor (1951) is an author of children's and young adult literature (Shiloh, the Alice series, The Witch Saga).
- Robert Novak (1948) was a political journalist, writer, and television personality. He was known for his long writing and television relationship with Rowland Evans (Evans, Novak, Hunt & Shields).
- Lionel Richie (attended) is a 5-time Grammy Award-winning singer, songwriter, and record producer who was a member of the Commodores before starting a solo career, with hits including All Night Long (All Night), Say You, Say Me and Hello; he graduated from Joliet East in 1967.
- Larry Parks (1932) was an Academy Award-nominated actor (The Jolson Story). He testified before the House Un-American Activities Committee, and was blacklisted in Hollywood as a consequence. Parks married to film and television actress Betty Garrett.
- Roger Powell, Jr. was a University of Illinois basketball player whose team reached the 2005 NCAA tournament championship game. His father Roger Powell was a Joliet Central star who played basketball for Illinois State.
- George E. Sangmeister was a U.S. Representative (1989–95).
- Trina Shoemaker (1983) is a 3–time Grammy Award winning record producer and sound engineer.
- James J. Stukel (1955) was the 15th president of the University of Illinois.
- Bill Sudakis is a former MLB player (Los Angeles Dodgers, New York Mets, Texas Rangers, New York Yankees, California Angels, Cleveland Indians)
- Edwin Way Teale (1918) was a naturalist, journalist, and writer. He won the 1966 Pulitzer Prize for General Nonfiction for the book Wandering Through Winter.
- Lynne Thigpen (1966) was an actress with credits on film (Bicentennial Man), television (Where in the World Is Carmen Sandiego?), and stage. She won a Tony Award in 1997 for her role in the play An American Daughter.
- Audrey Totter (c. 1935), was an actress who starred in 1940s and '50s films including Lady in the Lake, The Set-Up, High Wall, Any Number Can Play and The Postman Always Rings Twice.
