= Joliet Township High School District 204 =

School district in Illinois, United States

Address
- 300 Caterpillar Dr. Joliet, Will County, Illinois, 60436; United States
- Coordinates: 41.5159°N 88.1450°W

District information
- Type: Public secondary
- Motto: Empowering Students to Compete and Contribute
- Grades: 9–12
- Established: 1899; 126 years ago
- Superintendent: Dr. Karla Guseman
- School board: Joliet Township High School District 204 Board of Education
- NCES District ID: 1720610

Students and staff
- Enrollment: 6,109
- Teachers: 336
- Staff: 892

Other information
- Website: www.jths.org

Joliet Township High School District 204 (often shortened to JTHS) is a high school district located in Joliet in western Will County, Illinois. Established in 1899 and founded in 1901, it is one of the area's oldest school districts. Originally consisting of a single school, Joliet Township High School (now known as Joliet Central High School), the district was expanded for the 1964–1965 school year with two new additional schools, Joliet East High School (closed in 1983, building now used for the Joliet Job Corps) and Joliet West High School (still in operation).

JTHS's administrative center is located at the former headquarters for The Herald-News.

The district has been named a Chicago Tribune Top 100 Workplace for two years in a row.

Joliet Public Schools District 86, Rockdale School District 84, Troy School District 30-C, and Elwood School District 203 feeds into this high school district.

== Demographics ==
In 2009 almost 53% of the district's students were classified as low income.
