= Doctor Dolittle's Puddleby Adventures =

Final work of Doctor Dolittle Books short stories, the author was Hugh Lofting

- 1952 book club edition ("Expertly Selected and Edited by Weekly Reader Book Club")
- Author: Hugh Lofting
- Language: English
- Series: Doctor Dolittle
- Genre: Animal fantasy, short story collection
- Publisher: J. B. Lippincott & Co.
- Publication date: 1952
- Publication place: United Kingdom
- Media type: Print (hardcover)
- Preceded by: Doctor Dolittle and the Green Canary

Doctor Dolittle's Puddleby Adventures is a collection of short stories written and illustrated by Hugh Lofting, published posthumously as twelfth and last in the Doctor Dolittle series of children's fiction. The stories and illustrations were distributed during the 1920s by the Herald Tribune Syndicate and all may have been published in the New York Herald Tribune newspaper, among others. The 1952 collection was their first appearance in book form.

The first edition contained introductory items by his widow and sister-in-law and eight Doctor Dolittle stories by Hugh Lofting:

- "Foreword" by Josephine Lofting
- "Doctor Dolittle and His Family" by Olga Fricker
- "The Sea Dog" (†)
- "Dapple"
- "The Dog Ambulance"
- "The Stunned Man"
- "The Crested Screamers"
- "The Green Breasted Martins"
- "The Story of the Maggot" (†)
- "The Lost Boy"

The contemporary book club edition omitted two of the longer stories (†) and there have been later editions of six rather than eight stories, without explanation. Separately, some editions omit the Foreword. In the Foreword, Lofting's widow Josephine Fricker Lofting named her collaborator "my sister, Olga Michael", as she had done in the Foreword to its predecessor, the novel Doctor Dolittle and the Green Canary (1950), which Olga Fricker Michael completed after Hugh Lofting's death.

The first four stories may be read at the beginning of the 1927 novel Doctor Dolittle's Garden. "The Green Breasted Martins" follows Chapter XII in The Story of Doctor Dolittle (1920). "The Crested Screamers" and "The Lost Boy" are to be placed in that order within Part One, Chapter 12 of the 1926 book Doctor Dolittle's Caravan. "The Story of the Maggot" is given a greatly reduced summary at the conclusion to early printings of Part Two, Chapter 4 of Doctor Dolittle's Garden.
