= Doctor Dolittle (TV series) =

American animated television series

- Genre: Cartoon series
- Created by: David H. DePatie; Friz Freleng; Lennie Weinrib; Paul Harrison
- Written by: Paul Harrison; Lennie Weinrib
- Voices of: Bob Holt; Don Messick; Hal Smith; Robert Towers; Lennie Weinrib
- Theme music composer: Leslie Bricusse
- Opening theme: "Talk to the Animals" by Leslie Bricusse; Sung by Bob Holt and Lennie Weinrib
- Ending theme: "Talk to the Animals" (instrumental)
- Composer: Doug Goodwin
- Country of origin: United States
- Original language: English
- No. of seasons: 1
- No. of episodes: 17

Production
- Producers: David H. DePatie; Friz Freleng
- Editors: Roger Donley; Todd McKay; Joe Siracusa
- Running time: 30 min.
- Production companies: DePatie–Freleng Enterprises; 20th Century Fox Television

Original release
- Network: NBC
- Release: September 12, 1970 – September 2, 1971

Doctor Dolittle (also known as The Further Adventures of Dr. Dolittle) is a 1970–1971 American Saturday morning animated series produced by DePatie–Freleng Enterprises in association with 20th Century Fox Television. The series is loosely based on the books by Hugh Lofting, as well as the 1967 film of the same title which center around Doctor Dolittle, an animal doctor who has the ability to talk to animals.

The show was created for television by David H. DePatie and Friz Freleng in association with Paul Harrison and Lennie Weinrib. The series was broadcast on the NBC network. An altered version of the song "Talk to the Animals" was heard during the opening credits.

The series only has a DVD release in Germany from Pidax.

== Synopsis ==
Doctor Dolittle travels around the world on his ship called the Flounder to help out any sick animal in need. He is aided in his missions by his first mate, young sailor Tommy Stubbins. They share the ship with its animal crew.

Wherever Doctor Dolittle's ship was, Sub-Mar Island was never far behind. A disguised submarine, Sub-Mar Island is actually the stronghold of Sam Scurvy and his pirate crew. The pirates dress in an unusual mixture of old-fashioned pirate and gangster gear. The pirate crew were also a branch of the Democratic Organisation of Pirates International (or "DOPI" for short). Sam Scurvy has one goal in life: world domination. He believes that if he can get the secret to talking to animals from Doctor Dolittle, he will be able to raise an army of "creepy creatures" to help him take over the world. By using his eavesdropping device the Sneaky Snorkel, Scurvy gets wind of Doctor Dolittle's latest missions and then plots to hinder, disrupt, or even kidnap the Doctor, Tommy, or any one of his animals, in order to force him to reveal how he is capable of talking to animals. However, due to Doctor Dolittle's skills as well as the pirates' ineptitude, they never succeed.

== Characters ==
- Doctor Dolittle (voiced by Bob Holt in an English accent impersonating Rex Harrison) - an animal doctor who can talk to animals.
- Tommy Stubbins (voiced by Hal Smith in an English accent) - a sailor and Doctor Dolittle's first mate who can also talk to animals.
- Chee-Chee (voiced by Don Messick) - the cabin monkey.
- Dab-Dab - a duck who is also the ship's cook.
- Polynesia - the Doctor's pet parrot who taught him how to talk to animals.
- The Pushmi-Pullyu (voiced by Don Messick) - a llama which has two heads (one of each) at opposite ends of its body. It serves as the ship's lookout where it would often warn Dr. Dolittle about the approaching pirates. One head has a blue collar, while the other has an orange collar and wears glasses.
- Too-Too - the wise owl.
- Jip (voiced by Don Messick) - the Doctor's pet dog.
- George and the Grasshoppers - a rock group of grasshoppers that lives inside Doctor Dolittle's medicine case and are led by George (voiced by Lennie Weinrib). At one point during each episode of the series, the group would launch into a rock or pop song, popping the sides of the medicine case open and using it like a stage with Doctor Dolittle's bottles of pills and medicines glowing and flashing into different psychedelic colors behind the group as they sang. The singing voices of the Grasshoppers are provided by Robbie Faldoon, Annadell, Colin Johnson, Mike Sherwood, and Glyn Nelson.
- Sam Scurvy (voiced by Lennie Weinrib in a Brooklyn accent) - the leader of a faction of pirates of the organization D.O.P.I. who plans to learn how to talk to animals so that he can take over the world. Sam Scurvy wears a fedora and a business suit.
  - Cyclops - a hulking dimwit pirate with an eyepatch over his good eye.
  - Zig-Zag (voiced by Lennie Weinrib) - an uptight French pirate.
  - Nico (voiced by Don Messick) - an Italian pirate.
  - Miko - a Chinese pirate.

== Episodes ==
No.	Title	Directed by	Original release date
1	"The Grasshoppers Are Coming, Hooray, Hooray!"	Hawley Pratt, Oscar Dufau	September 12, 1970
The pirates will stop at nothing to learn the Doctor's secret. They track him to Grasshopper Island, where he has gone to treat the entire grasshopper population who have lost their voices after munching on poisoned grass. When the Doctor and Tommy are taken prisoner, only the insects can save them.
2	"The Bird Who Was Afraid to Fly"	Gerry Chiniquy, Grant Simmons	September 19, 1970
Montgomery the gooney bird suffers from a chronic lack of confidence and simply cannot take to the air, although he tries to convince Doctor Dolittle it is more of a lack of interest. His chance to be a hero comes when the Doctor gets into a fix and Montgomery has to summon the animals to the rescue.
3	"The Land of the Tiger Moo"	Oscar Dufau, Art Davis	September 26, 1970
The creatures of a Florida swamp are upset by an agitated alligator for whom the cure is milk from the Tiger-Moo, a hybrid of a cow and a tiger. But when the Doctor travels to Tiger-Moo Island to acquire the milk, he finds the pirates have arrived there first, and now the unique animal is in danger...
4	"The Great Turkey Race"	Gerry Chiniquy, Grant Simmons	October 3, 1970
Polynesia's old friend Toots the Turkey attempts to escape from the Sandwich Island turkey farm. When she is captured before escaping, she becomes the first prize in the Thanksgiving Ocean race. Dolittle enters the Flounder in the race knowing he has to win to save Toots—but runs into some engine trouble along the way.
5	"The Peanut Conspiracy"	Lars Calonius, Sid Marcus	October 10, 1970
Eric the elephant is allergic to peanuts, so the Doctor needs to find some Peanut-Cillin. Along with Tommy and Chee-Chee, he visits the jungle drugstore—run by a very strange pharmacist—but only peanut oil is at hand. The Doctor's plan is to make the medicine using green-scented mushrooms mixed with the oil, so Tommy and Chee-Chee set out to pick them. Behind those giant mushrooms, though, lurks a trap...
6	"The Bare Bear"	Sid Marcus, Oscar Dufau	October 17, 1970
Dolittle heads for the Bering Strait to assist the thin-skinned polar bears living there who have lost their fur and are freezing. He concocts a special formula to restore their fur coats. With the pirates trying to steal his medicine, it looks like the Doctor will need help from the local Mountie.
7	"High Flying Hippo"	Lars Calonius, Art Davis	October 24, 1970
Hannah the overweight hippo is not looking where she is going and falls down a mountain. Fortunately, she lands on a ledge. A pair of eagles spot her, summon the Doctor, and they help him up onto the ledge to treat Hannah. The ingenious Doctor contrives a makeshift balloon for getting them all off the crumbling mountain, but as they are about to go, Hannah loses her nerve.
8	"The Near-Sighted Bull"	Grant Simmons, Gerry Chiniquy	October 31, 1970
The group are in Spain sourcing supplies for the Flounder when Romeo, the bull who cannot see a thing, goes on a rampage and ends in the water. After the crew rescue the animal, his owner Don Carlos asks Doctor Dolittle for help. The Doctor provides Romeo with glasses which somehow transform him into the best bull in town and now he must enter the ring in the fiesta, where Scurvy is posing as the matador and has taken the bull's glasses.
9	"The Silver Seals of the Circus"	Grant Simmons, David Detiege	November 7, 1970
Stanley and Cyrus, two performing seals, are injured in a fall during a show and send for Doctor Dolittle. With the seals out of action, it is up to the Pushmi-Pullyu to save the circus. Meanwhile, the pirates trick their way into the big top disguised as trapeze artists. Once inside, they use clown costumes in their latest attempt to steal the Doctor's secret with a determined sheriff on their tail.
10	"A Girl for Greco Gorilla"	Art Davis, Gerry Chiniquy	November 14, 1970
The Doctor and Tommy are visiting a zoo in Ireland where they encounter Greco, a lonely and homesick gorilla whom they agree to take back to Africa. Aboard the ship, it is discovered he is also pining for a mate. So they resolve to find Greco a girlfriend. In the jungle, Greco sees his dreamboat and chases her, but then the Doctor and Tommy meet attractive gorilla Raquel... and they quickly realize the female Greco's after is not who she seems to be.
11	"A Tail of Two Snails"	Oscar Dufau, Lars Calonius	November 21, 1970
Oil pollution has destroyed the habitat of Hamilton, the last of the Giant Pink Sea Snails, and has also meant there are no sea-cumbers which are his only food source. Dolittle plans to tow the snail to Sea-Cumber Island, with a cargo of three tons of sea-cumbers cut from the ocean bed by the swordfish. All is going well until the appearance of a second giant snail...only this one's on wheels and hides the pirates inside.
12	"A Fox Called... Sherlock?"	Sid Marcus, Grant Simmons	November 28, 1970
As the crew are taking the opening tour of the Doctor Dolittle Wax Museum, Jip is "dog-napped" by the pirates. The Doctor, Tommy, and the animals enlist the help of Sherlock the fox sleuth to crack the case and rescue Jip. But time is short—eight hours to be precise. Further confusion arises when the pirates use Jip to create a second statue of the dog.
13	"The Tomb of the Phoenix Bird"	Oscar Dufau, Grant Simmons	December 5, 1970
Polynesia tells of the legend of the Phoenix, a supposedly mythical creature who comes back to life once every hundred years. As the fateful day approaches, the group head off to Egypt to verify the tale and find out if the animal really exists. Scurvy and his men are there too and capture the Doctor with the use of a fake 'pyramid'... but help is at hand from one magical bird set to have the time of his century.
14	"The Barnyard Rumble"	Gerry Chiniquy, Art Davis	December 12, 1970
In Mid-West America, Cogburn the rooster loses his voice and cannot wake up the barnyard. The Doctor diagnoses laryngitis. After the treatment, the Doctor finds that Cogburn cannot stop talking, a useful talent when a band of motorcyclists turn up looking to cause mayhem.
15	"The Baffled Buffalo"	Lars Calonius, Sid Marcus	December 19, 1970
The Flounder is docked in Washington, D.C. when the Doctor is summoned by the President of the United States. He requests that the Doctor goes West to find a buffalo to be the model for a special commemorative medallion, a mission made harder by a runaway train, a buffalo deeply mistrustful of all humans and a posse of 'Indians' who look worryingly familiar...
16	"A Hatful of Rabbit"	Jim Pabian, Gerry Chiniquy	December 26, 1970
While in London preparing for another leg of the round-the-world trip, the Doctor is called to treat a hyperactive rabbit which is part of a magician's act. The group then attend the magic show, unaware that it has been taken over by the pirates. Disguised as the magician, Scurvy selects an audience volunteer to help with the disappearing trick.
17	"The Bird from O.O.P.S."	Art Davis, Sid Marcus	January 9, 1971
As a birthday gift from his people, the Maharajah Sheldon will receive his weight in diamonds, but for his mum, Sheldon is 'all skin and bone' and thus will not earn her many jewels. She plans to fatten him up by feeding him a rare ogle-bird egg that is so rare, in fact, it is the only one in existence. The Doctor tries to save the ogle-bird from extinction, but Scurvy's levitation device might help the pirates to make off with the prize.

== Cast ==
- Bob Holt – Dr. John Dolittle
- Hal Smith – Tommy Stubbins
- Lennie Weinrib – Sam Scurvy, Zig-Zag, George Grasshopper
- Don Messick – Jip the Dog, Pushmi-Pullyu, Chee-Chee, Nico
- Robert Towers – additional voices

== Syndication problems ==
The series has not been shown in syndication in recent years due to the politically incorrect stereotypes of the pirate crew, as well as the strong drug implications present during George and the Grasshoppers' rock and pop numbers.

It first appeared on British TV on BBC1 on Thursday, 25 November 1971. It was dubbed in Sinhala in Sri Lanka as "Dosthara Hoda hitha".
