= Gub Gub's Book =

1932 children's book by Hugh Lofting

Gubbb Gub's Book: An Encyclopedia of Food
- Cover of the first ed. with Lofting illustration.
- Author: Hugh Lofting
- Illustrator: Lofting
- Series: Doctor Dolittle
- Genre: Fantasy, children's novel
- Publisher: Frederick A. Stokes Co.
- Publication date: 1932
- Publication place: United States
- Media type: Print (hardcover)
- Pages: 185
- LC Class: PZ7.L827 Gu
- Preceded by: Doctor Dolittle in the Moon
- Followed by: Doctor Dolittle's Return

Gub Gub's Book: An Encyclopedia of Food: In Twenty Volumes is a 1932 children's book in the Doctor Dolittle series by Hugh Lofting.

Gub-Gub the pig was one of the first animals with whom Doctor Dolittle learned to talk and appears in most of the books. This book features stories from and about Gub-Gub's attempt to write an encyclopedia of food.

The frontispiece of the book introduces "An Encyclopedia of Food in Twenty Volumes", going on to explain that "Prof. GUB GUB Announces that Owing to the High Cost of Living the other 19 Volumes of this GREAT WORK have been Temporarily Postponed". The book takes the form of a Scheherazade story, with chapters unfolding evening by evening. As Gub-Gub deals patiently with his raucous animal friends, they are drawn into his world and find out such vital information on the food map as where King Alfred burnt the cakes.

The book readable is by adults as well as children, who will possibly better appreciate the value and practicality of the gingersnap hygrometer.

The hyphen in the name Gub-Gub is replaced by a space on the dust jacket, on the title page, and on the dedication page, but the hyphen appears in the name elsewhere.
