= List of Doctor Dolittle characters =

This is a list of characters from the Doctor Dolittle series of children's books by Hugh Lofting and movies based on them. Most of the characters were introduced in the first book, the 1920 novel The Story of Doctor Dolittle.

== Humans ==
=== Doctor Dolittle ===
Portrayed by

- Rex Harrison (1967)
- Eddie Murphy (1998, 2001)
- Robert Downey Jr. (2020)

Doctor John Dolittle is an English physician who became a doctor for animals after his parrot, Polynesia, taught him to speak animal languages. He lives in the fictional town of Puddleby-on-the-Marsh in England's West Country, along with his many animal friends. He has very few human friends and spends most of his time treating animals, travelling the world with his animals and conducting research into new animals and new forms of animal languages.

He is portrayed by Rex Harrison in the 1967 film Doctor Dolittle, Eddie Murphy in Dr. Dolittle (1998) and Dr. Dolittle 2 (2001), and by Robert Downey Jr. in Dolittle (2020). The Murphy films bear little resemblance to Lofting's character or plots. In the animated TV series from 1970, Doctor Dolittle is voiced by Bob Holt. In the 1984 series, The Voyages of Dr. Dolittle, he is voiced by John Stephenson.

=== Tommy Stubbins ===
Thomas "Tommy" Stubbins is a boy from Puddleby who, after taking an injured squirrel to Doctor Dolittle, becomes the doctor's friend and assistant. His father is the doctor's favourite shoemaker. He first appears in the 1922 novel The Voyages of Doctor Dolittle and acts as the narrator in all the books that take place after his arrival.

He is portrayed by William Dix in the 1967 film, and by Harry Collett in the 2020 film. In the animated TV series from 1970, he is voiced by Hal Smith. In the 1984 series, The Voyages of Dr. Dolittle, he is voiced by B. J. Ward.

=== Matthew Mugg ===
Matthew Mugg is the cat's-meat-man from Puddleby. He is a friend of Doctor Dolittle and helps to take care of the doctor's house and garden when the doctor is away travelling. He is illiterate but practical, and is the one who advised Dolittle to become an "animal doctor" and learn animal languages. He was played by Anthony Newley in the 1967 film.

=== Prince Bumpo ===
Prince Bumpo is an African prince from the kingdom of Jolliguinki, who has been sent to study at Oxford University by his father, and becomes a friend of the Doctor's. Bumpo is recognisable by his green umbrella and bare feet - not used to wearing shoes, he usually discards them.

He was originally supposed to appear in the 1967 film intact, but casting problems eventually led to his character being considerably softened and renamed as "William Shakespeare the Tenth", played by Geoffrey Holder.

=== Colonel Bellowes ===
Colonel Bellowes is a snobbish old man in Puddleby who appears briefly in The Voyages of Doctor Dolittle.

In the 1967 film, he became General Bellowes, a retired military commander and a magistrate, played by Peter Bull. He loathes any sort of new, unusual, or odd ideas, including veterinary science; he rejects that a veterinarian can talk to animals. He owns several dogs, horses and other animals, all of whom betray their owner when Dolittle queries them at his trial about their owner's excesses of food, drink and female companionship. General Bellowes deals harshly with Dolittle, who then flees the country before he can be committed to an asylum. By the end of the film, General Bellows decides to pardon Doctor Dolittle when all the local animals go on strike.

=== Emma Fairfax ===
Emma is portrayed in the 1967 film by Samantha Eggar, as the niece of General Bellowes, for a romantic interest to The Doctor.

=== Lily Dolittle ===
The deceased wife of the Doctor in the 2020 film, who is played by Kasia Smutniak. She is described as an adventurous explorer who shared Dolittle's love for animals, and the daughter of Rassouli, king of pirates. She died during a naval voyage she undertook on her own, when her ship was hit by a typhoon. Her father is in the possession of her journal, which is key to saving the life of the Queen of England. The journal contains the whereabouts of the Eden Tree.

=== Long Arrow ===
Long Arrow is an American Indian, son of Golden Arrow. He is the world's greatest naturalist, specializing in botany and traveling through the mountains of Peru and Spider Monkey Island. He has learned the language of eagles and thus is able to communicate with Dr. Dolittle. He is featured in The Voyages of Doctor Dolittle.

=== William Shakespeare the Tenth ===
William Shakespeare the Tenth is the tribal leader of Sea Star Island, a floating tropical paradise. He and his tribe are well educated in literature and history and each citizen is able to speak several languages ever since different books have washed up on Sea Star Island. Parents name their children after their favorite authors, hence his name.

He is nicknamed "Willy" and was played by Geoffrey Holder in the 1967 film. He never appeared in any of Lofting's original books and is loosely based on Prince Bumpo.

=== Sarah Dolittle ===
Sarah Dolittle is John Dolittle's sister and former housekeeper, first featured in The Story of Doctor Dolittle. When Dolittle allows the crocodile to reside on his premises, which scares his clients away and throws the household back into poverty, she leaves in disgust and gets married when Dolittle refuses to evict the reptile.

She later reappears in Doctor Dolittle's Circus, along with her husband, Reverend Launcelot Dingle from Grimbledon. She persuades her brother to use the alias "John Smith" while appearing in the circus (so as to not embarrass Sarah if her new social circle learn she is related to a 'circus showman').

Sarah Dolittle is portrayed by Portia Nelson in 1967 film.

== Doctor Dolittle's animals ==
=== Polynesia ===
Polynesia is Doctor Dolittle's first animal friend, a West African parrot. She is able to speak English and was the one who first taught Doctor Dolittle the language of animals. She always says she can never remember how old she is, but she remembers that when she came to England, she saw Charles II of England, hiding in an oak tree from the Roundheads: "he looked very frightened".

Along with Chee-Chee and the crocodile, she decided to stay in Africa at the end of the original book, but returned in later stories. In The Voyages of Doctor Dolittle she is described as grey and scarlet.

In the 1967 film and the 2020 film (where she is voiced by Emma Thompson and narrates the story), she is portrayed as a macaw; the first film has her explicitly state that she is 199 years old and remembers everything from when she arrived in England and saw King Charles II in hiding, and the stage musical features her sad over how Dolittle will miss her two-hundredth birthday due to his exile.

She is absent from the Eddie Murphy movie and is replaced with Lucky the dog (voiced by Norm MacDonald), but it is possible the owl character (voiced by Jenna Elfman) is based on her. She also appears in the animated Doctor Dolittle TV series.

=== Gub-Gub ===
Gub-Gub is Doctor Dolittle's pet pig. He is a great lover of food. Gub Gub's Book: An Encyclopedia of Food is written as if it were a record of conversations with Gub-Gub on its contents.

=== Jip ===
Jip is Doctor Dolittle's dog. He has a very keen sense of smell. In The Story of Doctor Dolittle, he was able to rescue a man stranded on an island by following the man's scent across the ocean. He appears as a Labrador Retriever in the 1967 film. In the 2020 film, he appears as an Irish Wolfhound and wears glasses, and is voiced by Tom Holland.

In the 1998 movie and all four of its sequels, Dolittle has a different dog named Lucky (voiced by Norm MacDonald).

Jip also appears in the animated show, voiced by Don Messick.

=== Chee-Chee ===
Chee-Chee is a monkey from Africa whom Doctor Dolittle buys from an organ-grinder in The Story of Doctor Dolittle. His name apparently means "ginger" in monkey language. He appears as a chimpanzee in the 1967 film. In the 2020 film, he appears as a gorilla voiced by Rami Malek. In the animated show, he is voiced by Don Messick.

=== Dab-Dab ===
Dab-Dab is Doctor Dolittle's pet duck. After the doctor's sister, Sarah Dolittle, leaves the house in Puddleby due to her dislike of crocodiles, Dab-Dab becomes the doctor's housekeeper. She appeared in the 2020 film voiced by Octavia Spencer. She also appears in the animated show, where she is depicted as the ship's cook.

=== Too-Too ===
Too-Too is the doctor's pet owl. He acts as the doctor's accountant and can tell the doctor immediately how much money he has in the money box. Too-Too appears in the animated TV series Doctor Dolittle.

=== Cheapside ===
Cheapside is a Cockney sparrow from East London. He often visits the doctor, to gossip or bring important news. He is notorious for using bad language. Cheapside and his wife Becky live at St. Paul's, in the statue of St. Edmund's left ear. He is a recurring character in the books.

=== Pushmi-Pullyu ===
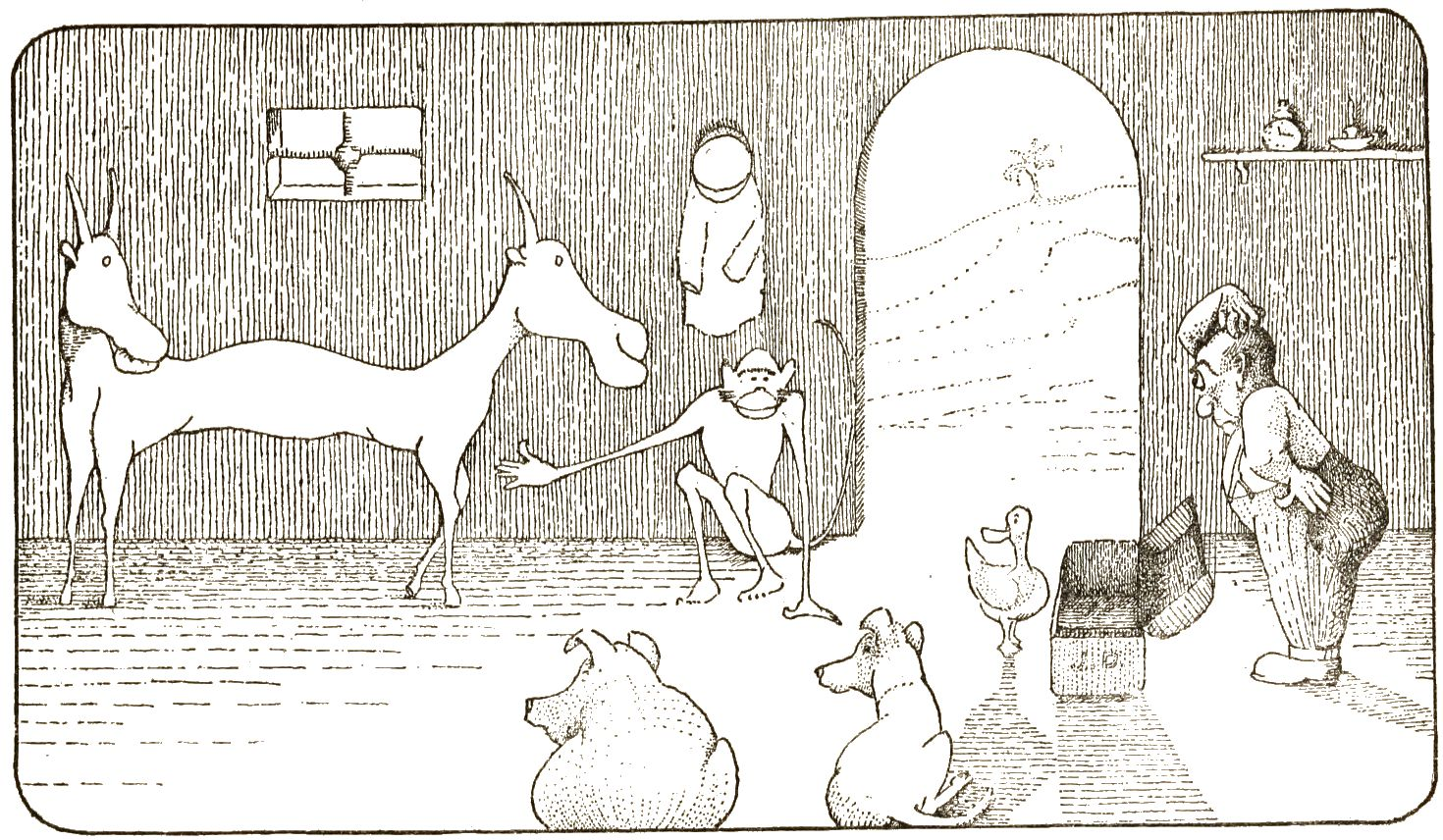
The Pushmi-Pullyu

The Pushmi-Pullyu (pronounced "push-me—pull-you") is a "gazelle/unicorn cross" with two heads (one of each) at opposite ends of its body. In The Story of Doctor Dolittle, the grateful monkeys in Africa persuade it to accompany Dr. Dolittle to England to earn money for him (in Doctor Dolittle's Circus and Doctor Dolittle's Caravan). The pushmi-pullyu usually only uses one of its heads to talk, reserving the other for eating (thus allowing it to eat while speaking without being rude) and claims that its great-grandfather was the last unicorn.

In the 1967 film, the pushmi-pullyu was instead portrayed as a double-sided llama. The doctor can immediately speak to the pushmi-pullyu, knowing that llamas speak a dialect of camel language. This is the version that appears in the TV series, where he is voiced by Don Messick.

The 1998 Eddie Murphy film has a brief scene where a pushmi-pullyu is walking in the background while Dr. Dolittle talks to the tiger in the cage. This is in keeping with the fact that Eddie Murphy's version is only very loosely based on the books.

=== Toggle ===
Toggle is a visually-impaired plowhorse who gets spectacles in The Story of Doctor Dolittle. In the 1967 film, he is owned by General Bellowes.

=== Great Glass Sea Snail ===
This enormous undersea mollusk with a transparent airtight shell is injured when the mysterious floating Spider Monkey Island finally comes to rest in The Voyages of Doctor Dolittle. The animals arrange for him to ferry Dr. Dolittle and his party back through the ocean to Puddleby.

In the 1967 film, Dolittle resigns himself to living abroad for the rest of his life due to the price on his head issued by General Bellowes. The [renamed] Great Pink Sea Snail takes Matthew, Tommy, Emma and a host of small animals from the [renamed] Sea Star Island back to England.

=== Sophie the Seal ===
Sophie the Seal is rescued by Dolittle in Dr Dolittle's Circus. She makes it apparent to the doctor that she does not like life at the circus and wants to return to the sea to find her husband. Dolittle disguises her as a woman and takes her to the sea, but a villager in Brighton witnesses Dolittle throwing her off a cliff and gets him arrested for murder. The doctor is released from jail by the local magistrate, Sir William Peabody, who is an old school friend. She presumably makes it back to Alaska.

In the 1967 film, Dolittle is tried and found guilty of insanity by General Bellowes, who commits him to an insane asylum. The animals catch wind of it and help Dolittle hightail it out of town before he can be incarcerated, embarking upon a series of worldwide adventures on the open sea.

When Sophie catches up to him again, he is ensconced upon Sea Star Island. As the Great Pink Sea Snail leaves with his human and animal cargo, Sophie along with her husband and pups informs him that every animal in Puddleby has gone on strike to protest the treatment of Dolittle by General Bellows. Overjoyed, he enlists the services of the Giant Lunar Moth to help him return to Britain.

=== Giant Lunar Moth ===
In Lofting's original books, the Giant Moth named Jamaro Bumblelily makes the arduous trip between Earth and the Moon in Doctor Dolittle's Garden and Doctor Dolittle in the Moon.

In the 1967 film, the Giant Lunar Moth travels regularly back and forth between Earth and the Moon. When Doctor Dolittle gets good news from England that the animals have gone on strike and General Bellows has decided to pardon Doctor Dolittle, he ends his exile on Sea Star Island by persuading the moth to make a slight detour and drop him off in Puddleby.

=== Miranda ===
In The Voyages of Doctor Dolittle Miranda is the purple bird of paradise. She helps Doctor Dolittle get to Spidermonkey Island by telling him the weather conditions. She also relays messages between Long Arrow and Doctor Dolittle, and one who tells Doctor Dolittle that Long Arrow has gone missing.
