= Mudface =

Mudface may refer to:

- Mudface the Giant Turtle, character in Doctor Dolittle and the Secret Lake, Doctor Dolittle's Post Office, and other stories.
- Mudface (Redman album)
- Mudface (Anybody Killa album)
