= Olga Fricker =

Canadian dancer

- Olga Fricker, from a 1931 newspaper
- Born: July 19, 1902; Kitchener, Ontario, Canada
- Died: November 20, 1997 (aged 95); Sacramento, California, U.S.
- Other names: Olga Seabridge, Olga Michael
- Occupations: Dancer, dance educator, writer

Olga Marguerite Fricker (July 19, 1902 – November 20, 1997) was a Canadian-born dancer, educator and choreographer, a proponent of the Cecchetti method of ballet training. She is also associated with the Doctor Dolittle children's stories of her brother-in-law, Hugh Lofting.

== Early life and education ==
Fricker was born in Kitchener, Ontario, the daughter of Jacob Fricker and Lavina Mary Freeman Fricker. She trained with Amy Sternberg in Toronto.

== Career ==
=== Dance ===
Fricker moved to the United States during the 1920s. In 1931, she directed dances for an open-air production of A Midsummer Night's Dream at Belle Isle Park. In 1934, she and her company gave a recital at the Detroit Institute of Arts. In 1935 she danced as a soloist with the Lansing Symphony Orchestra. She worked with Victoria Cassan in Detroit and took over the School of Dance at the Civic Theatre there. She established the Concert Group, which danced to works by Bach, Strauss, and Liszt with the Detroit Symphony Orchestra. She became a charter board member of the Cecchetti Council of America and completed her teacher qualifying examinations in the Cechetti method with the Imperial Society of Teachers of Dancing. She choreographed her companies' performances.

Fricker and Darby moved from Detroit to Los Angeles in 1953, and opened a school there; it was successful enough to expand to three locations by 1960. She established a Cecchetti Summer School, a Cecchetti Ballet Company for students and the California Festival Ballet company. In 1971, with Lucille McClure and Shiela Darby, she founded Cecchetti USA.

Fricker's dance students include Jennet Zerbe of the American Ballet Theatre, Carla Moseley of the Montecito School of Ballet, Tita Boulger of the Peninsula School of Performing Arts, and Kathleen Noblin, founder and director of the Ventura County Ballet.

=== Writing ===
Fricker's sister Josephine was the third wife of English-American writer Hugh Lofting, author of the Doctor Dolittle series of children's books. She completed two of his books which were published posthumously based on material which had previously appeared in serial format: Doctor Dolittle and the Green Canary (1950) and Doctor Dolittle's Puddleby Adventures (1952). She also wrote the script for a play based on the series, Hugh Lofting's Doctor Dolittle (Dramatic Publishing, 1976). The play is performed often by school and children's theatre programs.

== Personal life and legacy ==
Fricker married Jack Seabridge in Detroit in 1925; they divorced in 1938. She married Jay Michael in 1939 in Indiana. She had a daughter, Joan Seabridge. Fricker died in 1997, at the age of 95, in Sacramento. The Fricker/Darby Scholarship, which supports the development of teachers of the Cecchetti method, was established in the name of Fricker and Shiela Darby.
