= Dolittle (film) =

2020 film by Stephen Gaghan

- Theatrical release poster
- Directed by: Stephen Gaghan
- Screenplay by: Stephen Gaghan; Dan Gregor; Doug Mand
- Story by: Thomas Shepherd
- Based on: Doctor Dolittle by Hugh Lofting
- Produced by: Joe Roth; Jeff Kirschenbaum; Susan Downey
- Starring: Robert Downey Jr.; Antonio Banderas; Michael Sheen; Harry Collett; Emma Thompson (voice); Rami Malek (voice); John Cena (voice); Kumail Nanjiani (voice); Octavia Spencer (voice); Tom Holland (voice); Craig Robinson (voice); Ralph Fiennes (voice); Selena Gomez (voice); Marion Cotillard (voice)
- Cinematography: Guillermo Navarro
- Edited by: Craig Alpert; Chris Lebenzon
- Music by: Danny Elfman
- Production companies: Roth/Kirschenbaum Films; Team Downey; Perfect World Pictures
- Distributed by: Universal Pictures (United States); Toho-Towa (Japan)
- Release dates: January 8, 2020 (South Korea); January 17, 2020 (United States); February 7, 2020 (United Kingdom); June 19, 2020 (Japan); July 24, 2020 (China)
- Running time: 101 minutes
- Countries: United States; China; United Kingdom; Japan
- Language: English
- Budget: $175–192.4 million
- Box office: $251 million

Dolittle is a 2020 fantasy adventure film directed by Stephen Gaghan from a screenplay by Gaghan, Dan Gregor, and Doug Mand, based on a story by Thomas Shepherd. Dolittle is based on the title character created by Hugh Lofting and is primarily inspired by the author's second Doctor Dolittle book, The Voyages of Doctor Dolittle (1922). Robert Downey Jr. stars as the title character, alongside Antonio Banderas, Michael Sheen, and Harry Collett in live-action roles, with Emma Thompson, Rami Malek, John Cena, Kumail Nanjiani, Octavia Spencer, Tom Holland, Craig Robinson, Ralph Fiennes, Selena Gomez, and Marion Cotillard voicing an array of creatures.

It is the third iteration of film adaptions based on the character, after the 1967 musical Doctor Dolittle starring Rex Harrison and the 1998–2009 Dr. Dolittle film series starring Eddie Murphy as the titular character and later Kyla Pratt as his daughter Maya, and the only one not to be distributed by 20th Century Fox (now 20th Century Studios).

The project was announced as The Voyage of Doctor Dolittle in March 2017 with Downey set to star, and the rest of the cast joined over the following year. Filming began in March 2018 and lasted through June, taking place around the United Kingdom. The film underwent three weeks of reshoots in the spring of 2019, directed by Jonathan Liebesman and written by Chris McKay, after initial test screenings yielded poor results.

Universal Pictures theatrically released Dolittle in the United States on January 17, 2020. The film was met with mixed to negative reviews from film critics and grossed $251 million worldwide, making it a box-office bomb for a reported loss of $50–100 million. However, due to the COVID-19 pandemic, it was the seventh highest-grossing film of 2020. It was nominated for six Golden Raspberry Awards, including Worst Picture, winning for Worst Remake, Rip-off or Sequel.

== Plot ==
In Victorian era Britain, Dr. John Dolittle is a Welsh veterinarian with the ability to communicate with animals. After his adventurous wife Lily dies at sea, Dolittle retreats from human society, living in seclusion at the animal sanctuary gifted to him by Queen Victoria.

Years later, young animal lover Tommy Stubbins is forced to go hunting, accidentally wounding a red squirrel named Kevin. He finds himself led to Dolittle's home by Poly the macaw, who hopes his arrival will help Dolittle reconnect with humans. There, Tommy meets Queen Victoria's maid of honor Lady Rose, sent to summon Dolittle to help the queen, who has fallen seriously ill. Tending to Kevin, Dolittle agrees to see Victoria, realising that he will lose his home to the Treasury if the queen dies.

At Buckingham Palace, Dolittle finds Victoria being treated by his lifelong rival, Dr. Blair Müdfly, in the presence of Lord Thomas Badgley. Dolittle discovers the queen has been poisoned with nightshade and can only be cured by the magical fruit of the Eden Tree. Leaving Jip the Irish Wolfhound and stick insect Styx to guard the queen, Dolittle mounts an expedition of various animals, including Chee-Chee the gorilla, Yoshi the polar bear, and Plimpton the ostrich, but refuses to take Tommy.

Poly sends Betsy the giraffe and Tutu the fox to bring Tommy aboard Dolittle's ship, convincing the doctor to accept his help. However, Lord Badgley plots to seize the throne for himself, and sends Müdfly to stop Dolittle's quest. Enlisting the help of a whale to escape Müdfly and the warship HMS Britannia, Dolittle is saved from drowning by Tommy, who begins to learn to talk to animals.

Dolittle and Tommy infiltrate the bandit island of Monteverde to steal the only map to the Eden Tree, contained in Lily's journal salvaged from her shipwreck. They are captured by King Rassouli, Lily's father, who leaves Dolittle to be eaten by Barry the Bengal tiger. The doctor is rescued by his animals as Tommy steals the journal, which is seized by Müdfly and his soldiers, who sink Dolittle's ship. Moved by Dolittle's undying love for Lily, Rassouli gives him another vessel to continue his journey, pursuing Müdfly with the help of more whales.

They arrive on Eden Tree Island only to be captured by Müdfly, who inadvertently awakens the dragoness guarding the tree. Realising she is suffering from the death of her mate, as well as a bowel obstruction, Dolittle successfully treats the grateful dragoness, who leads him to the Eden Tree. He and his animals return just in time for Tommy to cure Victoria with the magical fruit, and they expose the traitorous Badgley for poisoning the queen. Victoria has him imprisoned in the Tower of London, thanking Dolittle and Tommy for saving her.

Returning home, Dolittle reopens the sanctuary and takes on Tommy as his apprentice. Meanwhile, trapped in the dragoness's cave, Müdfly tries to speak to a swarm of angry bats.

== Cast ==
=== Human cast ===
- Robert Downey Jr. as Dr. John Dolittle, a Welsh widowed veterinarian who has the ability to speak to animals.
- Antonio Banderas as King Rassouli, Lily's father and the king of Monteverde.
- Michael Sheen as Dr. Blair Müdfly, an old schoolmate and rival of Dolittle who gradually becomes impressed by Dolittle's special ability.
- Jim Broadbent as Lord Thomas Badgley, one of the Queen's chairmen who sends Müdfly to get the Eden Tree fruit first.
- Jessie Buckley as Queen Victoria, the Queen of the United Kingdom.
- Harry Collett as Tommy Stubbins, Dolittle's self-appointed apprentice.
- Kasia Smutniak as Lily Dolittle, Dolittle's deceased wife and King Rassouli's late daughter.
- Ralph Ineson as Arnall Stubbins Sr., Tommy's paternal uncle.
- Carmel Laniado as Lady Rose, a maid of honor to the Queen who becomes Tommy's friend and love interest.
- Joanna Page as Bethan Stubbins, Tommy's paternal aunt.
- Elliot Barnes-Worrell as Captain William Derrick, a British Captain Officer who follows Dr. Müdfly's orders.
- Sonny Ashbourne Serkis as Arnall Stubbins Jr., Tommy's paternal cousin.

=== Animal voice cast ===
- Emma Thompson as Polynesia ("Poly" for short), a wise and brave blue and yellow macaw with an English accent and Dolittle's most trusted adviser.
- Rami Malek as Chee-Chee, a western gorilla who suffers from fear caused by PTSD from poachers.
- John Cena as Yoshi, a happy-go-lucky polar bear who wears a chullo because he is always cold; hinted because it's been caused by trauma from his father's disappearance.
- Kumail Nanjiani as Plimpton, a critical but well-meaning common ostrich with striped stockings who often argues with Yoshi as well as transporting Dolittle on occasion.
- Octavia Spencer as Dab-Dab, a helpful but deluded call duck with a prosthetic leg who is close friends with Yoshi.
- Tom Holland as Jip, a loyal wolfhound who wears glasses to help him see.
- Craig Robinson as Kevin, a cheeky-chippy red squirrel with a bad attitude.
- Ralph Fiennes as Barry "The Butcher" Bernstein, an aggressive and moody Bengal tiger with gold fangs, who lives on Monteverde and has a past with Dolittle.
- Selena Gomez as Betsy, a friendly Maasai giraffe.
- Marion Cotillard as Tutu, a French red fox who is best friends with Betsy and often rides on her head. She replaces Too-Too the owl who was featured in the original Doctor Dolittle books.
- Frances de la Tour as Ginko-Who-Soars (credited as "Dragoness"), a dragoness who guards the magical fruits of Eden.
- Jason Mantzoukas as James, a comical dragonfly.
- Nick A. Fisher as Mini, a cute sugar glider.
- Tim Treloar as Humphrey, a humpback whale that Dolittle enlists.
- Jim Carretta as:
  - Arthur (credited as "Bearded Mouse"), a bearded mouse who was in Dolittle's beard before it was shaved off.
  - Leona, an octopus that belongs to Queen Victoria.
- Ranjani Brow, Kelly Stables and Scott Menville as mice.
- Matthew Wolfe as an army ant.
- David Sheinkopf as Don Carpenterino, the boss ant who is Dolittle's and James' contact on Monteverde.
- Will Arnett as a hare in one of Rassouli's prison cells, who wears an eyepatch and is a friend of Barry. (uncredited)

== Production ==
In March 2017, Robert Downey Jr. was cast to star in The Voyage of Doctor Dolittle, a feature adaptation of Hugh Lofting's second published Doctor Dolittle book, The Voyages of Doctor Dolittle. Downey was paid $20 million for his involvement. In December, Harry Collett and Jim Broadbent were also cast, in live-action roles. The following year in February, Antonio Banderas and Michael Sheen were added to the live-action cast, while Tom Holland, Emma Thompson, Ralph Fiennes, and Selena Gomez were cast to voice animals, including Barry, a tiger, Yoshi, a bear, and Regine, a lioness. In March, Kumail Nanjiani, Octavia Spencer, John Cena, Rami Malek, Craig Robinson, Marion Cotillard, Frances de la Tour and Carmen Ejogo all signed on for voice roles as well. The character of Regine, the lioness voiced by Ejogo, was cut from the finished film.

Principal production commenced mid-February 2018. Live-action scenes began filming in Kirkby Lonsdale, Cumbria in May, with further location filming at South Forest, Windsor Great Park, at Cothay Manor in Stawley, Somerset and on the Menai Suspension Bridge in North West Wales, in June.

The film went through 21 days of re-shoots in April 2019 following poor test screenings. Director Jonathan Liebesman helped to oversee the filming alongside Stephen Gaghan, while Chris McKay wrote new material after it became clear from first cuts that the comedy elements of the film were not coming together as well as the producers had hoped. Prior to this, Universal had turned towards Seth Rogen and Neighbors co-writer Brendan O'Brien to help add comedy to the film, but neither could remain committed to the project and dropped out. McKay was assigned to storyboard sequences and assemble different edits before later leaving to instead direct The Tomorrow War. Liebesman took over McKay's duties and finished the film alongside Gaghan. The Lego Batman Movie scribe John Whittington had also performed rewrites on the script amid reshoots, and flew to London to meet with Downey, who allegedly tore Whittington's script apart in favor of "new ideas". The Hollywood Reporter stated that despite a "challenged production", there were no fights for power and no competing cuts for the film. The film's title was changed from The Voyage of Doctor Dolittle to simply Dolittle in August. The film was budgeted at $175 million before reshoots. According to financial statements analyzed by Forbes the film spent a total of $233.6 million, with a net cost of $192.4 million after UK tax credits.

In January 2020, on Joe Rogan's podcast The Joe Rogan Experience, Downey discussed the inspiration for the Dr. John Dolittle character in the film, which he said stemmed from a Welsh neo-pagan physician called William Price: "Same way I did with Iron Man... before I signed on, I was just googling 'weirdest Welsh doctor', I just wanted to think of, I don't want to just do another English accent.. so there was this guy called William Price, who's a nutty Welsh doctor, he was a neo-druidist, he believed that he could communicate with all nature and all that stuff, so I sent a picture of this wild looking guy wearing this kind of suit with stars on it and like a staff in his hand [to Gaghan]... and he goes, "That looks good to me" and I was like "great let's do this movie"".

Music artist Sia performed a new song of hers, "Original", for the end credits, while Danny Elfman composed the film's score.

== Release ==
=== Theatrical ===
The film was released by Universal Pictures. It was originally set for May 24, 2019, but was moved to April 12 of that year, to avoid competition with Star Wars: The Rise of Skywalker, which itself was later moved from May to December 20, 2019. The film was later moved again to January 17, 2020.

=== Home media ===
Dolittle was released on Digital HD on March 24, 2020, and on DVD, Blu-ray, and Ultra HD Blu-ray on April 7. As of July 12, 2020, the film had made $14.3 million in home media sales.

== Reception ==
=== Box office ===
Dolittle grossed $77 million in the United States and Canada, and $174.5 million in other territories, for a worldwide total of $251.5 million. Due to its high production and marketing costs, The New York Observer estimated that the film needed to gross over $500 million worldwide to break even; following its debut weekend, it was estimated the film would lose Universal between $50–100 million.

In the United States and Canada, the film was released alongside Bad Boys for Life, and was projected to gross $20–22 million from 4,155 theaters in its three-day opening weekend, and a total of around $27 million over the full four-day Martin Luther King Jr. Day weekend. It made $6.3 million on its first day, including $925,000 from Thursday night previews. It went on to debut to $22 million for three days, and $29.5 million over the four-day frame, finishing second, behind Bad Boys for Life. The film made $12.1 million in its second weekend and $7.7 million in its third, remaining in second both times.

After months of delays, the film was released in China on July 24, and made $5.2 million from about 3,000 screens in its opening weekend. By August 6, the film had reached $14.6 million in grosses in the country.

=== Critical response ===
On Rotten Tomatoes, the film has an approval rating of 15% based on 241 reviews, with an average rating of 4/10. The site's critics consensus reads: "Dolittle may be enough to entertain very young viewers, but they deserve better than this rote adaptation's jumbled story and stale humour." On Metacritic, the film has a weighted average score of 26 out of 100, based on 46 critics, indicating "generally unfavorable" reviews. Audiences polled by CinemaScore gave the film an average grade of "B" on an A+ to F scale, while PostTrak reported an average of 3 out of 5 stars from viewers they surveyed.

American critic Courtney Howard of Variety called the film a "frenetic, crass kids' flick" and wrote: "What should have been an awe-filled adventure quickly curdles into an awful one, thanks to a pedestrian formula and the filmmakers' fixation on fart jokes". Writing for The Hollywood Reporter, American critic Todd McCarthy said: "From the very first scene, it's clear something is terribly off with this lavishly misbegotten attempt to repopularize an animal-loaded literary franchise that was born exactly a century ago. The oddly diffident star and executive producer Robert Downey Jr. never finds the power-supplying third rail needed to energize a tale that fails to make a real case for being reinterpreted".

British critic Mark Kermode gave the film a negative review: "Terrible script. Terrible visuals. Dull plot. Dismal gags. The fact (is) that at 101 minutes it really, really tested one's patience. It is shockingly poor". In examining the film's ending, American critic Lisa Laman of Screen Rant noted that the film as a whole suffered from numerous problems, including "...Dolittle's new backstory involving a deceased wife...the largely lifeless voice-over work of the animal characters [and] its painfully unfunny comedy".

Much of the criticism focused on Robert Downey Jr.'s portrayal of the character with a Welsh accent, which the actor himself called "the single hardest accent on Earth". Mark Kermode derided the attempt, calling it "something from Mars" and comparing it unfavorably with the Welsh actor Michael Sheen's use of an English accent and suggesting the film had been heavily dubbed. Welsh reviewers were more positive. Simon Thompson praised the attempt, stating "it's a brave choice, I take my hat off to Robert Downey Jr. for going for it" and "as flawed as it is, it warmed the cockles of my heart to hear a Welsh accent in the cinema". Another Welsh reviewer said that appraisal of the accent "depends on how much love you have for him in attempting to do it in the first place", arguing that he had "clearly swotted up on the dialect, dropping in random phrases like 'tidy' and 'mun', along with 'I'll be there in a minute now' and 'twty down'".

A segment in the film in which Dolittle removes bagpipes from Ginko-Who-Soars (de la Tour)'s' anus, inducing flatulence, was criticised as "gross" and "disgusting". In a retrospective article, The Telegraph called it "a set-piece that will be forever seared into the minds of those unfortunate enough to sit through it".

Robert Downey Jr. later referred to the movie as "a two-and-a-half-year wound of squandered opportunity", and noted that its troubled production and failure led to a major rethinking of his career and life.

In 2025, the film topped ScreenCrush's list of "The 10 Worst Movies of the Last 10 Years," with Matt Singer writing "What had started as a presumably more serious affair was turned into a cinematic Frankenstein's monster of poop jokes, fart jokes, itchy butt jokes, talking animals, wonky CGI, and Robert Downey Jr. going so big and broad he makes Johnny Depp's Captain Jack Sparrow look like an introvert."

=== Accolades ===
Award	Ceremony date	Category	Subject	Result	Ref.
Costume Designers Guild Awards	April 13, 2021	Excellence in Sci-Fi/Fantasy Film	Jenny Beavan	Nominated	
Golden Raspberry Awards	April 24, 2021	Worst Picture	Joe Roth, Jeff Kirschenbaum and Susan Downey	Nominated	
Golden Raspberry Awards	April 24, 2021	Worst Director	Stephen Gaghan	Nominated	
Golden Raspberry Awards	April 24, 2021	Worst Actor	Robert Downey Jr.	Nominated	
Golden Raspberry Awards	April 24, 2021	Worst Screenplay	Stephen Gaghan and Dan Gregor & Doug Mand; Based on the character by Hugh Lofting	Nominated	
Golden Raspberry Awards	April 24, 2021	Worst Screen Combo	Robert Downey Jr. and his utterly unconvincing "Welsh" accent	Nominated	
Golden Raspberry Awards	April 24, 2021	Worst Prequel, Remake, Rip-off or Sequel		Won	
Kids' Choice Awards	March 13, 2021	Favorite Movie		Nominated	
Kids' Choice Awards	March 13, 2021	Favorite Movie Actor	Robert Downey Jr.	Won	
People's Choice Awards	November 15, 2020	Family Movie of 2020		Nominated	
People's Choice Awards	November 15, 2020	Male Movie Star of 2020	Robert Downey Jr.	Nominated	
Set Decorators Society of America Awards	March 31, 2021	Best Achievement in Décor/Design of a Comedy or Musical Feature Film	Lee Sandales and Dominic Watkins	Nominated	
