= Doctor Dolittle's Caravan =

Sixth work of Doctor Dolittle Books, the author was Hugh Lofting

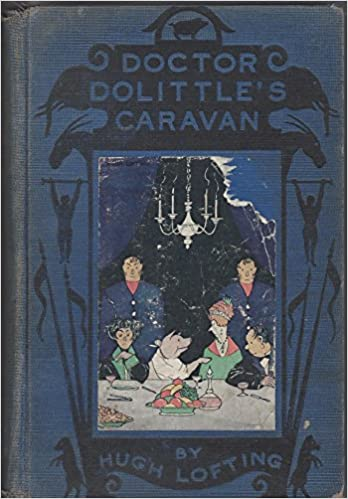
- Cover of the first ed. with Lofting illustration.
- Author: Hugh Lofting
- Illustrator: Hugh Lofting
- Cover artist: Hugh Lofting
- Series: Doctor Dolittle
- Genre: Fantasy, children's novel
- Publisher: Frederick A. Stokes Co.
- Publication date: 1926
- Publication place: United States
- Media type: Print (hardcover)
- Pages: 342
- LC Class: PZ10.3.L85 Dc
- Preceded by: Doctor Dolittle's Zoo
- Followed by: Doctor Dolittle's Garden

Doctor Dolittle's Caravan is a novel written by Hugh Lofting and published in 1926 by Frederick A. Stokes. It deals with the titular character's bird opera, centering on a female green canary named Pippinella. It is one of many books Hugh Lofting authored about Doctor John Dolittle.

== Plot summary ==
Pippinella is special in that she possesses what is generally assumed to be an exclusive trait of male canaries: birdsong. Ultimately, Doctor Dolittle creates a "Canary Opera" (using canaries and other bird species as well), based on Pippinella's life story. This opera, jointly composed by both the Doctor and Pippinella, becomes an overwhelming success in the Regent Theatre, London. He also shuts down a poorly run pet store and receives accolades from Niccolò Paganini himself.

The novel disrupts the chronological order of the series, with events occurring between Doctor Dolittle's Circus and The Voyages of Doctor Dolittle despite the book's publication between Doctor Dolittle's Zoo and Doctor Dolittle's Garden. This book is the follow-up to Doctor Dolittle's Circus, for the Doctor (at this point in time) is still operating the circus he inherited from the runaway former owner, Albert Blossom. Pippinella's eventual fate, and Doctor Dolittle's final adventures with her, are ultimately revealed in the much later book, Doctor Dolittle and the Green Canary.
