= Dr. Dolittle: Million Dollar Mutts =

2009 film by Alex Zamm

- Official DVD cover
- Directed by: Alex Zamm
- Written by: Daniel Altiere; Steven Altiere
- Based on: Doctor Dolittle by Hugh Lofting
- Produced by: John Davis; Brian Manis
- Starring: Kyla Pratt; Tegan Moss; Brandon Jay McLaren; Norm Macdonald
- Cinematography: Bert Dunk
- Edited by: Marshall Havey
- Music by: Chris Hajian
- Production company: Davis Entertainment
- Distributed by: 20th Century Fox Home Entertainment
- Release date: May 19, 2009
- Running time: 83 minutes
- Country: United States
- Language: English

Dr. Dolittle: Million Dollar Mutts (also known as Dr. Dolittle 5 or Dr. Dolittle: A Tinsel Town Tail) is a 2009 American comedy film directed by Alex Zamm and starring Kyla Pratt and Norm Macdonald. It was released on May 19, 2009, and like its predecessor, Dr. Dolittle: Tail to the Chief (2008), was a direct-to-DVD release.

It is the fifth and final film in the Dr. Dolittle film series, before the 2020 reboot and is the final Dr. Dolittle film to be distributed by 20th Century Fox, and the third film in the series not to feature Eddie Murphy as Dr. John Dolittle and Raven-Symoné as Charisse Dolittle, though they are mentioned in the film. Pratt, MacDonald, and Phil Proctor are the only cast members to have been involved in all five films.

== Plot ==
Maya Dolittle thinks she doesn't have to spend 7 years in college to be a vet because she can talk to animals. While taking a walk with Lucky, she helps a cat on a tree by talking to it. She gets discovered and Tiffany Monaco, a Hollywood star, brings her to Los Angeles to help her little puppy, who turns out to be a male. Soon, Maya and Tiffany began creating their own show, The Animal Talkers. Maya also meets Brandon Booker, who she develops a romantic interest in. Maya soon finds out the show isn't about helping animals and goes back home to study being a vet. She also finds out Brandon is at her school too. Meanwhile, Maya's friend Monkey is out in L.A. searching for his big break but quits because he wants to help Maya.

== Cast ==
- Kyla Pratt as Maya Dolittle, Lisa Dolittle's daughter.
- Tegan Moss as Tiffany Monaco, a Hollywood star.
- Brandon Jay McLaren as Brandon Booker, Emmy's owner who is also Maya's love interest.
- Jason Bryden as Rick Beverley
- Karen Holness as Lisa Dolittle, Maya's mother.
- Judge Reinhold as Network Executive
- Sebastian Spence as Chad Cassidy
- Elizabeth Thai as Reporter
- Frank Cassini as Firefighter
- Sarah Deakins as Vet
- Mark Hillson as Biker
- Doron Bell as Ridiculuz
- Curtis Caravaggio as Chase
- Matthew Harrison as Paul Furhooven

=== Voice cast ===
- Norm Macdonald as Lucky the Dog
- Jaime Ray Newman as Emmy, a Shetland Sheepdog who is Brandon's pet dog and Lucky's love interest. She speaks with a Valley Girl accent.
- Phil Proctor as Monkey/Snake
- Greg Ellis as Dave the Dove
- Fred Stoller as Fluffernufferman, a white rabbit.
- Pauly Shore as Cat, an Orange tabby cat.
- Jeff Bennett as Princess / Rocco / Frog / Horse
- Vicki Lewis as Chubster, a pig.
- Stephen Root as Turtle
- Greg Proops as Puppy
