= Doctor Dolittle's Circus =

1924 children's novel by Hugh Lofting

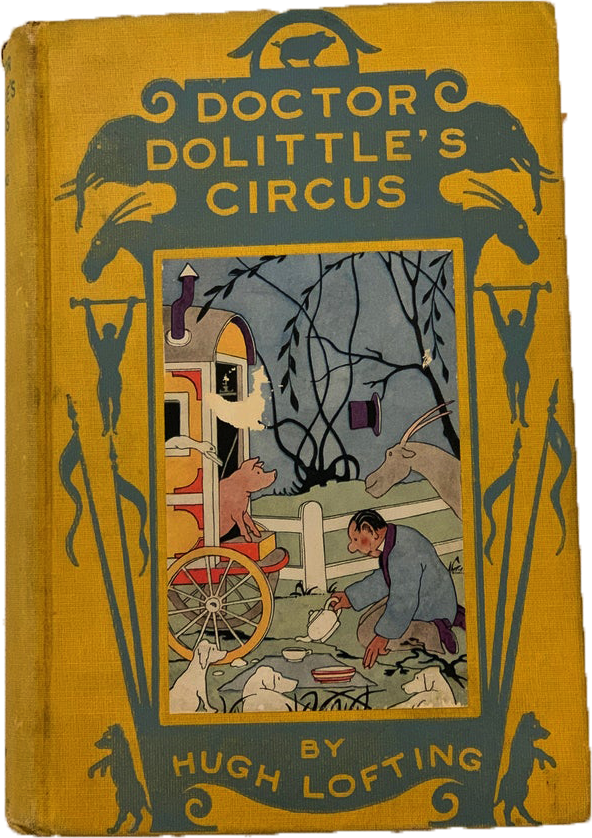
- First edition
- Author: Hugh Lofting
- Language: English
- Series: Doctor Dolittle
- Genre: Children's novel
- Publisher: Frederick A. Stokes
- Publication date: 1924
- Publication place: United Kingdom
- Media type: Print (hardback and paperback)
- Preceded by: Doctor Dolittle's Post Office
- Followed by: Doctor Dolittle's Zoo

Doctor Dolittle's Circus, written by Hugh Lofting and published in 1924 by Frederick A. Stokes, is set in England sometime between the original story and the later voyages narrated by Stubbins. It was one of the novels in the series which was adapted into the film Doctor Dolittle.

== Plot summary ==
The story begins with Doctor John Dolittle looking for some money to earn to pay off his voyage to Africa. The Doctor's idea is to get the Pushmi-Pullyu into the circus, but he can't find one until Matthew Mugg suggest a small business circus owned by the ring master Blossum. The Doctor visits Blossum and persuades him to visit his house in Puddleby to discuss the payment and rules of the Pushmi-Pullyu before its performance in the circus.

The performance goes well after the Pushmi-Pullyu is put into the show and the doctor starts earning, but he also discovers the circus animals are living in wretched conditions, which Blossum doesn't co-operate with when the doctor makes suggestions on how to improve their lot. The doctor then meets Sophie the Alaskan seal, who is owned by Mr Higgins. She explains to him that she misses her husband Slushy, who is her herd's alpha seal, so the Doctor plans an escape for Sophie. When the night comes for the escape, Dolittle waits in the street while Matthew and Jip get Sophie out of the circus, but the guards shut the gate before the seal can make a break for it, so Matthew and his wife Theodosia distract them by luring them to Sophie's tank and pushing them in. The whole circus goes into pandemonium when they see the disappearance of the seal, but Sophie manages to escape eventually.

When Dolittle and Sophie reach the outskirts of the town, Sophie suggests that if they follow the river, they will get to the sea quicker. They consult the ducks, who tell them to go to Talbot's Bridge, which will lead them to Kippet River all the way to the Bristol coast. Dolittle buys some lady clothes to disguise Sophie while travelling in a coach, but the people in the coach grow suspicious - mistaking him for a notorious highwayman and Sophie for the highwayman's accomplice - so the Doctor and Sophie have to leave. The Doctor and Sophie meet up with the same horse whom the Doctor gave spectacles for his eyesight and who obliges to take them in his wagon to the Kippet River. When they reach the river, Sophie swims most of the way, and finally the doctor throws Sophie into the sea from a cliff, still in her disguise.

The doctor gets arrested by the coastguard for allegedly throwing his wife in the sea. In prison, the Doctor meets Sir William, an old school friend who is now a fox hunter and whom the Doctor tries to persuade to stop killing foxes. The police sergeant later comes in to explain to the doctor that the coastguard made a mistake and that the doctor is free to go. When the doctor makes his way back to Appledyke, he meets a mother vixen called Nightshade who is on the run with her cubs from fox hunters. The Doctor hides Nightshade and her cubs in his jacket, and when he discovers Sir William is on the hunt, he tells the hunter's dogs to hunt elsewhere so the foxes can escape.

After having saved Nightshade and her cubs, Dolittle returns to Blossum's Circus and finds there is a talking horse called Nino who performs a series of signs to communicate. Nino falls ill, so the doctor explains to Blossum that he can talk to animals and has an idea to use Beppo as a substitute talking horse for the act. Beppo later tells the Doctor of a nice pasture where he wishes to retire, so the Doctor persuades the farmer to let him buy the farm. The pasture is turned into The Retirement Cab and Wagon Horse Association, and soon afterwards the son of the farmer and his friends get paid by the Doctor to plant radishes to feed the horses with.

The Doctor then gets his animal friends, including Dab-Dab, Gub-Gub, Jip, Toby and Swizzle, to perform in a play called "The Puddleby Pantomime", and is approved by Mr Bellamy when the performance is done. However, Blossum disappears with the money he owes everyone, and the circus people elect the Doctor as the new manager of the circus. The Doctor reluctantly agrees and arranges everything to his satisfaction by giving tea and peppermints to his visitors.

One night the circus' lion and leopard ask the Doctor if they could stretch their legs by coming out of their cages. After the Doctor makes them promise not to eat anybody, the lion and leopard wander around each evening but one night the lion gets lost, frightens the visitors and, because he is hungry, eats some of a farmer's chickens, which the Doctor has to pay for. After the Doctor agrees with the leopard and the lion that he'll keep watch for them each time they have their night stroll, he decides to let the animals take over the performances in the circus and get rid of the people performing in it so the people can enjoy it more.

== Characters ==
- Doctor John Dolittle – main character a doctor who can talk to animals.
- Mathew Mugg – Doctor Dolittle's friend who suggests Blossum's Circus.
- Gub-Gub – Doctor Dolittle's pig.
- Pushmi-Pullyu – the two-headed gazelle/unicorn (llama in the TV series) who is taken to perform in Blossum's circus.
- Jip – Doctor Dolittle's faithful dog.
- Dab-Dab – Doctor Dolittle's housemaid who is a duck.
- Blossum – the ringmaster of the circus.
- Sophie – the seal who is taken against her will into the circus.
- Sir William – Doctor Dolittle's childhood friend who hunts foxes.
- Mr. Higgins – the owner of Sophie.

== Adaptions ==
Parts of the story of Doctor Dolittle's Circus were featured in the 1967 film starring Rex Harrison, including the circus with the pushmi-pullyu, the fox hunt and the escape of Sophie the seal.
