= Victory for the Slain =

1942 poem by Hugh Lofting

Victory for the Slain is an anti-war poem written by children's author Hugh Lofting, creator of the Doctor Dolittle series. Published in 1942, the poem is based on Lofting's experiences during World War I. It is the only work Lofting wrote for adults.

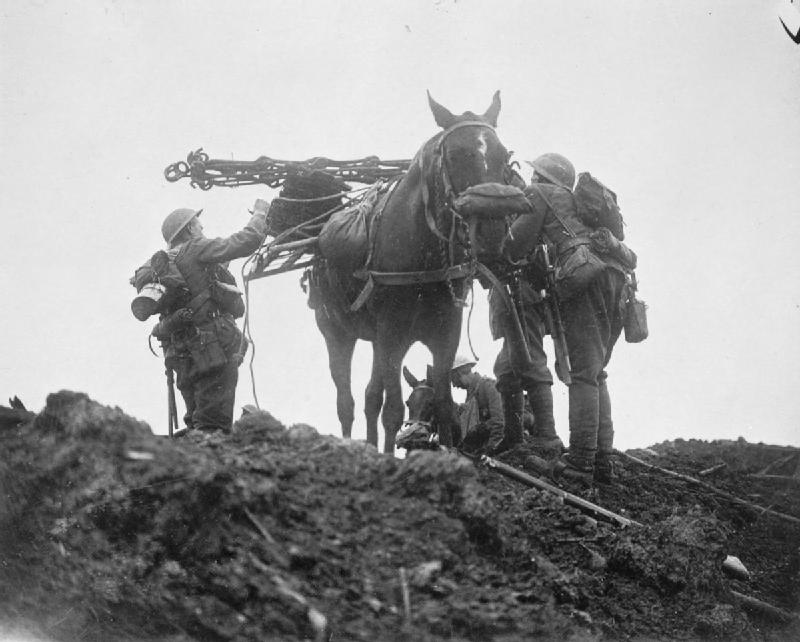
Hugh Lofting's pacifism, a major theme in the poem Victory for the Slain, grew from his experiences in World War I where horses, like the one pictured here, had no way to defend themselves.

== Background and Lofting’s pacifism ==
Lofting was a pacifist and was often frustrated at the quickness in which governments resorted to armed conflict to resolve international issues. Lofting mocked the reoccurring "latest war to end all wars" mentality and the martial ardor that often pervaded children's literature. While the theme of the poem is no different from those in the Doctor Dolittle series, the "meaningless and folly of war" as one commentator put it, it is presented in a manner more dark and grim than his children's literature.

Lofting's views were informed by his own experiences in Flanders during the First World War. In 1918 he was wounded by shrapnel from a hand grenade in the upper thigh, an injury that would plague him the rest of his life because of the doctor's inability to remove the metal fragments. Soon after his injury he left active service and moved to the United States where he wrote his popular children's series about a country physician who learned to communicate with animals. Scholars have said that the Dr. Dolittle series can also been read as a statement on the cruelty of war and a reflection of the hope that Lofting saw from peace and cooperation.

As early as 1924, Lofting was editorializing about the negative effects of war on children. In an article written for The Nation, Lofting railed against what he called "tin-soldierism", a state of mind common at the time that glorified war and "heroic deaths". He attacked children's classic literature about heroes galloping across battlefields. He wrote: "That kind of battlefield has gone for good, it is still bloody, but you don't gallop. And since that kind of battlefield has gone, that kind of book—for children—should go too".

Lofting became an internationalist as a result of his experiences stemming from World War I and advocated "Peace Preparedness" between nations. He also, at least implicitly, became an anti-imperialist who stressed international cooperation. This spirit of cooperation is evident in his children's books. For instance, in The Voyages of Dr. Dolittle, the title character defends a smaller tribe of "Indians" from a larger tribe. Eventually Dolittle helps the two tribes forge a pact of cooperation. This is just one of many examples of his pacifist philosophy in his children's literature.

In the 1930s, Lofting fell into a state of despair at the rise of militarism on the European continent. Feeling like a modern Cassandra, Lofting began work on his seventeenth book, Dr. Dolittle and the Secret Lake. In the summer of 1941, however, he stopped work on the book to write Victory for the Slain.

Written just after the major part of Germany's bombing blitz on London, the poem's eventual publication in 1942 was met with little regard. Coming on the heels of England's near eradication, and written from the safe confines of California as his critics noted, it was not well received. That the poem was a culmination of a long-standing philosophy held by the author, rather than a reaction to the current conflict, was not understood by its readers and was a commercial failure. Later commentators observe that Victory for the Slain contributes to our understanding of Lofting and his anti-war message in Dr. Dolittle.

== Structure ==
Victory for the Slain is divided into seven parts, with each part symbolic of the narrator's progression. It uses a traditional rhyming convention. The word "slain" is repeated in the poem thirteen times and the thematic line, "In war the only victors are the slain", is repeated three times. It uses a mix of military and religious symbolism throughout the seven movements.

== Plot and themes ==
The narrator is an unknown individual who journeys to, and eventually into, a cathedral. On the way, in the first two movements of the poem, he passes infantry soldiers marching and a wounded World War I veteran. The narrator also passes the poor box which is symbolic of the wealth and treasures wasted in war. In the third movement the narrator then enters a church to seek solace where he muses about the folly of war and the inability of man to learn from his past mistakes as shown in this verse:

Why must I mingle and confuse
These sounds and thoughts that muse
So madly through my mind?
Wars to end wars? —War again!
Must Mankind forever kill and kill,
Thwarting every decent dictate
Of the human will?
War again! —
When well we know
War's final victors always were the slain.

In the end, the narrator doesn't find the solace that he seeks as the chancel, the portion of the cathedral he is in during three sections of the poem, is destroyed by bombs. However, the narrator vows to learn from the lessons of the past and not give in to hatred and military revenge. It is here, perhaps, that Lofting is referencing the ongoing conflict of World War II against the Nazi regime. Thus, Lofting and the narrator, as a single person, hope that the "slain" can lead the world to an enlightened peace.
