= Doctor Dolittle's Garden =

1927 children's novel by Hugh Lofting

- First edition
- Author: Hugh Lofting
- Language: English
- Series: Doctor Dolittle
- Genre: Children's novel
- Publisher: Frederick A. Stokes
- Publication date: 1927
- Publication place: United Kingdom
- Media type: Print (hardback & paperback)
- Preceded by: Doctor Dolittle's Caravan
- Followed by: Doctor Dolittle in the Moon

Doctor Dolittle's Garden (1927) is the eighth book in Hugh Lofting's Doctor Dolittle series of children's books.

== Plot ==
In the first part of the book, Doctor Dolittle's assistant, Tommy Stubbins, reports on Professor Quetch, curator of the Dog Museum in the Home for Crossbred Dogs. Some of the dogs tell the stories of their lives over dinner.

In the second part of the book, because his garden is teeming with insects, Dolittle decides to learn their language and contrives an apparatus that will allow him to do this. He begins to hear many fascinating stories, particularly one about a water beetle who was taken to Brazil in a clod of mud on a duck's foot.

The doctor also begins to hear talk about the Giant Moths. Fascinated, he plans a voyage to find them, but one of the giant moths appears in his garden. The rest of the book is about the doctor's efforts to communicate with the moth, while keeping the public away.
