= Doctor Dolittle and the Secret Lake =

Tenth work of Doctor Dolittle Books, the author was Hugh Lofting

- First edition
- Author: Hugh Lofting
- Illustrator: Hugh Lofting
- Language: English
- Series: Doctor Dolittle
- Genre: Fantasy, children's novel
- Publisher: J. B. Lippincott
- Publication date: 1948
- Publication place: United Kingdom
- Media type: Print (hardcover and paperback)
- Preceded by: Doctor Dolittle's Return
- Followed by: Doctor Dolittle and the Green Canary

Doctor Dolittle and the Secret Lake is a Doctor Dolittle book written by Hugh Lofting. The book was published posthumously in 1948, 15 years after its predecessor. Fittingly, it is the longest book in the series, and the tone is the darkest; World War II took place before the book was published, during which Lofting had published his 1942 anti-war poem Victory for the Slain. The book contains passages that almost border on being misanthropic with some very powerful passages concerning war and Man's inhumanity to man.

== Style ==
The book starts with the Doctor giving up his dream of lengthening human life with discoveries he made on the Moon, and showing signs of despair. The tone of the passages for the first time acknowledges 'nature red in tooth and claw': another of the Doctor's experiments, a house where scavengers and parasites can live without harming other creatures, is also doomed to failure.

The Doctor then receives an urgent call to rescue what is literally his oldest friend: Mudface the Giant Turtle, who was a passenger on Noah's Ark. Mudface's tale of the Great Flood is told, which was missing from Lofting's 1923 novel Doctor Dolittle's Post Office. Mudface's account of the Flood and its aftermath takes up most of the book, and it is by no means a jolly story. There are many references to genocide and slavery, including a passage where animals gather outside a hut to devour the humans inside (a young man and his beloved, who are the most sympathetic characters next to Mudface and his mate).

The book contains relatively little comedy, with occasional humorous passages providing contrast to its darker themes. Its style differs from Hugh Lofting's other works and has been regarded as an example of his most accomplished writing.

Also of note is that Lofting's depiction of African characters is far less caricatured than in previous novels.
