= Doctor Dolittle's Zoo =

Fifth work of Doctor Dolittle Books, the author was Hugh Lofting

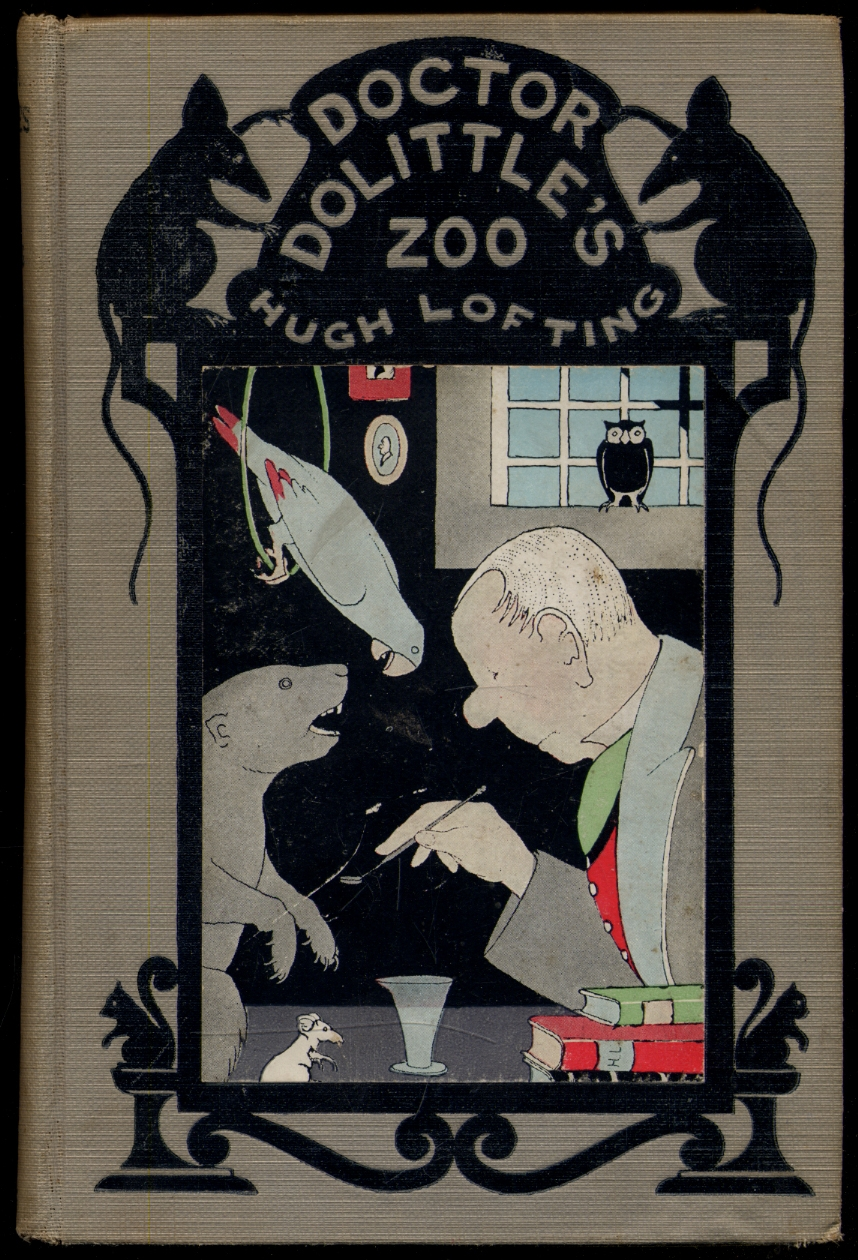
- First edition
- Author: Hugh Lofting
- Illustrator: Hugh Lofting
- Language: English
- Series: Doctor Dolittle
- Genre: Children's novel
- Publisher: Frederick A. Stokes
- Publication date: 1925
- Publication place: United Kingdom
- Media type: Print (hardback & paperback)
- Preceded by: Doctor Dolittle's Circus
- Followed by: Doctor Dolittle's Caravan

Doctor Dolittle's Zoo was written and illustrated by Hugh Lofting in 1925. In the book, Doctor Dolittle returns from his voyages and sets his house in order. This includes expanding his zoo to include a home for crossbred dogs and a club for rodents. Doctor Dolittle's Zoo is different from all others because there are no cages; the animals stay there voluntarily and are free to leave whenever they want. The doctor also takes time to solve a mystery with the aid of Kling, the Dog Detective.

In much of the book, the doings of Doctor Dolittle and his household form frame story to various members of the Rat and Mouse Club telling their life stories.
