= Doctor Dolittle and the Green Canary =

Eleventh work of Doctor Dolittle Books, the author was Hugh Lofting

- First edition
- Author: Hugh Lofting
- Language: English
- Series: Doctor Dolittle
- Genre: Children's novel
- Publisher: J. B. Lippincott & Co.
- Publication date: 1950
- Publication place: United Kingdom
- Media type: Print (hardback & paperback)
- Preceded by: Doctor Dolittle and the Secret Lake
- Followed by: Doctor Dolittle's Puddleby Adventures

Doctor Dolittle and the Green Canary is a Doctor Dolittle book written by Hugh Lofting. Although much of the material had been printed originally in 1924 for the Herald Tribune Syndicate, Lofting planned to complete the story in the book form but never finished before he died. Lofting's wife's sister, dancer Olga Fricker, completed the book and was published posthumously in 1950. Everything except the first and last chapter are by Lofting.

Much of the book is repeated from the 1926 novel, Doctor Dolittle's Caravan. It tells the story of the Doctor's friend Pippinella the Green Canary, in slightly greater depth.
