= Doctor Dolittle's Return =

1933 children's novel by Hugh Lofting

- Cover of the first ed. with Lofting illustration.
- Author: Hugh Lofting
- Illustrator: Lofting
- Series: Doctor Dolittle
- Genre: Fantasy, children's novel
- Publisher: Frederick A. Stokes Co.
- Publication date: 1933
- Publication place: United States
- Media type: Print (hardcover)
- Pages: 273
- LC Class: PZ7.L827 Doc
- Preceded by: Doctor Dolittle in the Moon
- Followed by: Doctor Dolittle and the Secret Lake

Doctor Dolittle's Return, published in 1933, is the ninth book in Hugh Lofting's Doctor Dolittle series. The book was published five years after the publication of Doctor Dolittle in the Moon and continues the plot line begun in that book. Lofting originally intended to end the series with Doctor Dolittle in the Moon, but for some reason changed his mind and the book was published.

== Plot summary ==
The book tells the story of how the Doctor returns from the Moon. The first half of the book covers the lives of Tommy Stubbins, the Doctor's assistant, the family of animals in England waiting for his return, and how the Doctor escaped from the Moon. The second half of the book deals with the quest of the Doctor for peace and quiet, so he can write a book about the Moon and his experiences there. But the constant demands of his patients make the project impossible to complete, so the Doctor attempts to have himself put in jail so he will be able to write his book.
