= Doctor Dolittle's Post Office =

1923 children's novel by Hugh Lofting

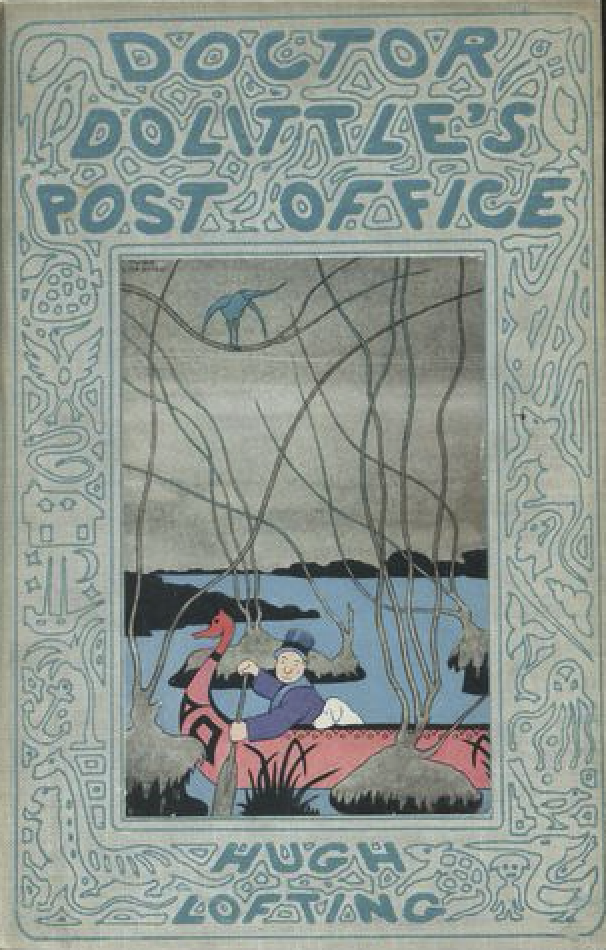
- First edition
- Author: Hugh Lofting
- Language: English
- Series: Doctor Dolittle
- Genre: Children's novel
- Publisher: Frederick A. Stokes
- Publication date: 1923
- Publication place: United Kingdom
- Media type: Print (hardback & paperback)
- Preceded by: The Voyages of Doctor Dolittle
- Followed by: Doctor Dolittle's Circus

Doctor Dolittle's Post Office is the third of Hugh Lofting's Doctor Dolittle books. Set on the West Coast of Africa, the 1923 book follows the episodic format of most other books in the series. In the beginning of the book, Doctor Dolittle helps to capture a slave trader's ship, then organizes the postal service of a small African kingdom, Fantippo, ruled over by King Koko. Mobilizing migrating birds to carry people's mail from continent to continent, Doctor Dolittle effectively anticipates the 20th century invention of air mail. Over the course of later chapters, he discovers a hidden island populated by prehistoric creatures, gets thrown into another African jail, invents animal alphabets, and defeats at least two armies. Each of the animals in the Dolittle family also tells a personal story. The postal program grows into a worldwide postal and publishing service for the benefit of animals everywhere.

The final segment of the book is the Doctor's journey to meet Mudface the Turtle, the oldest living creature on Earth, who survived the Great Flood. The extensive tale of the Great Flood is presented in a later volume of the series, Doctor Dolittle and the Secret Lake, posthumously published in 1948.
