= Talk to the Animals =

Song by Rex Harrison
- Released: 1967
- Recorded: 1967
- Length: 2:48
- Composer: Leslie Bricusse
- Lyricist: Leslie Bricusse

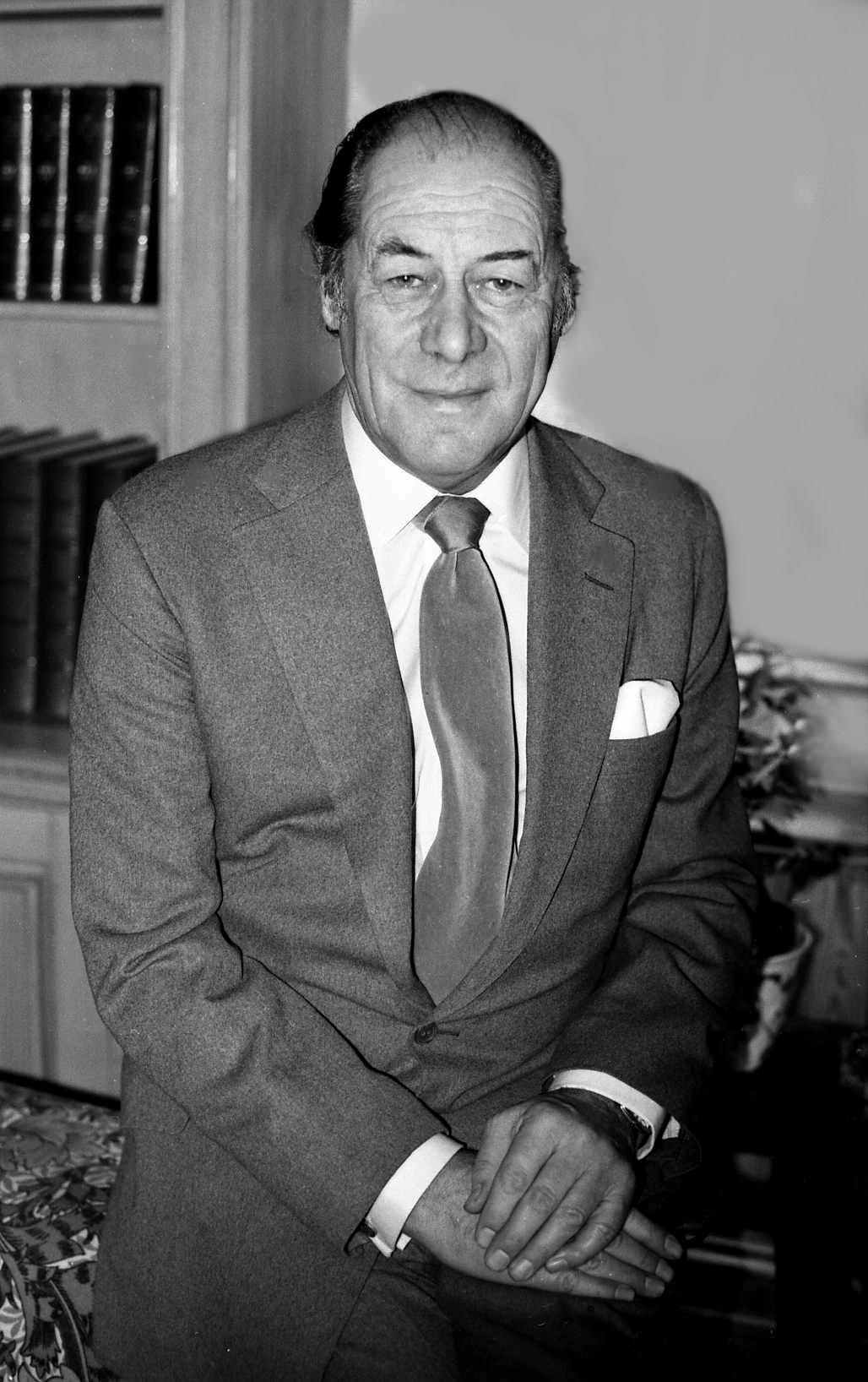
Portrait of Rex Harrison

"Talk to the Animals" is a song written by British composer Leslie Bricusse.

Written for the 1967 film Doctor Dolittle, it won the Academy Award for Best Original Song at the 40th Academy Awards. It was performed in the film by Rex Harrison. The song was not generally well appreciated, and in some cases was disliked, by those who were working on the film during the time of its production. However, it has since become the signature song of the character, and was the title song of the DePatie-Freleng animated cartoon series (1970). It was also featured in the 1998 remake of the film starring Eddie Murphy.

== Story context ==
The song first appears in Dolittle's residence, when the Doctor fully realizes from his parrot, Polynesia, that intelligently communicating with animals is an acquirable skill. In reaction, Dolittle resolves to master it with as many species as possible and starts the song as he muses about the skill's possibilities. The song is reprised outdoors when the Doctor finds he has mastered the skill and joyfully celebrates, surrounded by animals.
