= Doctor Dolittle (1967 film) =

1967 American musical film directed by Richard Fleischer

- Theatrical release poster by Tom Chantrell
- Directed by: Richard Fleischer
- Screenplay by: Leslie Bricusse
- Based on: Doctor Dolittle by Hugh Lofting
- Produced by: Arthur P. Jacobs
- Starring: Rex Harrison; Samantha Eggar; Anthony Newley; Richard Attenborough
- Cinematography: Robert L. Surtees
- Edited by: Samuel E. Beetley; Marjorie Fowler
- Music by: Leslie Bricusse; Lionel Newman; Alexander Courage
- Production company: APJAC Productions
- Distributed by: 20th Century Fox
- Release dates: December 12, 1967 (London, premiere); December 19, 1967 (U.S.)
- Running time: 152 minutes
- Country: United States
- Language: English
- Budget: $17 million
- Box office: $9 million

Doctor Dolittle is a 1967 American musical fantasy film directed by Richard Fleischer and starring Rex Harrison, Samantha Eggar, Anthony Newley, and Richard Attenborough. It was adapted by Leslie Bricusse from the Doctor Dolittle novel series by Hugh Lofting, primarily The Story of Doctor Dolittle (1920), The Voyages of Doctor Dolittle (1922), and Doctor Dolittle's Circus (1924).

Various attempts to make a film based on Doctor Dolittle began as early as the 1920s. In the early 1960s, actress-turned-producer Helen Winston acquired the film rights, but did not succeed in producing a film. In 1963, producer Arthur P. Jacobs acquired the rights and recruited Alan Jay Lerner to compose songs and Rex Harrison to star in the project. After numerous delays, Lerner was fired and replaced by Bricusse. In addition to the numerous technical difficulties inherent to working with the large number of animals required for the story, the production was impacted by numerous setbacks stemming from poorly chosen shooting locations and creative demands from Harrison, and the finished film cost almost three times more than its original budget of $6 million.

The film premiered in London on December 12, 1967. It recouped $9 million during its theatrical run, earning only $6.2 million in theatrical rentals and becoming a box-office bomb. Although the film received negative critical reviews, it was nominated for nine Academy Awards, including Best Picture, at the 40th Academy Awards, thanks to intense lobbying by 20th Century-Fox, and won Best Original Song and Best Visual Effects.

== Plot ==
In 1845, in the small port town of Puddleby-on-the-Marsh, England, Doctor John Dolittle works as a veterinarian and can talk to animals. A former medical doctor, Dolittle lives with a menagerie. The animals he kept in his home created havoc with his human patients who began to go elsewhere for their medical needs. His sister, who served as his housekeeper, demanded that he dispose of the animals or she would leave. He chose the animals. Dolittle's talking macaw Polynesia can speak over 2,000 animal languages. She offered to teach Dolittle so he could become an animal doctor. Dolittle can now speak nearly 500 animal languages and is in the process of learning how to speak with sea creatures for an upcoming expedition to search for the legendary Great Pink Sea Snail.

Dolittle is treating a horse for near-sightedness when its owner, magistrate General Bellowes, bursts in and accuses him of stealing the animal. Bellowes ends up getting chased away by skunks. His niece Emma Fairfax chides Dolittle for his rudeness and lack of compassion for humans. Dolittle expresses his contempt for Bellowes, who hunts foxes, and for her, who, he says, does absolutely nothing. She storms off.

To help Dolittle earn money for his expedition, a friend sends him a pushmi-pullyu, a rare creature. Dolittle takes the pushmi-pullyu to a nearby circus, and it becomes the star attraction. Dolittle talks with Sophie, a sad seal that longs to return to her husband at the North Pole. He smuggles Sophie out of the circus, disguises her in women's clothing to convey her to the coast, and throws her in the ocean. Fishermen witness this and have Dolittle arrested for murder.

When he appears in court before Bellowes, Dolittle proves that he can converse with animals by talking with Bellowes's dog and revealing details only Bellowes and the dog could know. Certain that he will be set free, he tells his friend Matthew Mugg to get ready to begin their expedition the next day. While he is acquitted on the murder charge, the vindictive Bellowes orders him committed to an insane asylum.

Polynesia engineers Dolittle's escape during his transfer to the asylum by obtaining the cooperation of the police horses and dogs. Dolittle, Matthew, Matthew's young friend Tommy Stubbins and some animals set sail in search of the Snail. Dolittle eventually discovers Emma, who is fascinated by him and seeks adventure, is also on board his ship the Flounder. As he will be arrested if he turns back, he agrees to let her be his cook and cabin boy. It is decided by randomly pointing at a map that the crew will search for the Snail on Sea Star Island, a floating island off the western coast of Africa. Assisted by sea creatures, they near Sea Star Island where they encounter a storm that destroys the Flounder.

Everyone washes ashore on the Island. The party is soon captured by the island's natives who are highly educated and cultured from reading books that have washed ashore after innumerable shipwrecks. The tribe blames newcomers for its misfortunes. The tropical island is drifting north into colder waters, which has given all of the animals colds.

Dolittle tends to the animals and then persuades a whale to push the island south. The jolt causes a balancing rock to drop into a volcano, condemning Dolittle and his friends to be executed. Just as they are about to be killed, the island collides with Africa and the two pieces fit perfectly, confirming a legend that the Island had broken off from Africa 5,000 years earlier. For bringing them home, the natives cancel the execution and revere Dolittle as a god.

A sneeze alerts Dolittle to the presence of the Snail, which lives in a cave on the island. In exchange for curing its cold, the Snail agrees to carry Dolittle's friends back to Britain in its watertight shell as it wants to visit its cousin the Loch Ness Monster anyway. Emma wishes to stay on the island with Dolittle and search for the Giant Lunar Moth, a creature that flies back and forth between Earth and the Moon, but he says he is not good with people. After saying that she will miss Dolittle, Emma kisses him goodbye.

Sophie and her husband later bring Dolittle the news that Bellowes has agreed to pardon him after all of the animals in England went on strike to protest his sentence. Having realized that he has feelings for Emma, Dolittle has the natives position themselves in the shape of the Moth so that he may design a saddle to ride it. That night, Dolittle rides the Moth back to Puddleby.

== Cast ==
- Rex Harrison as Dr. John Dolittle, an eccentric veterinarian who can communicate with animals
- Samantha Eggar as Emma Fairfax, General Bellowes' niece, who accompanies Doctor Dolittle on his voyage. The character was created for the film.
  - Diana Lee as Emma's singing voice
- Anthony Newley as Matthew Mugg, an Irishman who's Doctor Dolittle's friend and assistant
- Richard Attenborough as Albert Blossom, the owner of a circus
- Peter Bull as General Bellowes, Emma's uncle who is the magistrate of Puddleby-on-the-Marsh.
- Muriel Landers as Mrs. Edie Blossom, Albert's wife
- William Dix as Tommy Stubbins, Matthew's young friend
- Geoffrey Holder as William "Willie" Shakespeare X, the chieftain of Sea Star Island. The character is loosely based on Prince Bumpo from Lofting's books.
- Portia Nelson as Sarah Dolittle, Doctor Dolittle's sister who used to be his housekeeper
- Norma Varden as Lady Petherington, Doctor Dolittle's hypochondriac patient

=== Uncredited ===
- Jack Raine as The vicar, Doctor Dolittle's patient with hay fever
- Arthur Gould-Porter as Sir Rupert, Doctor Dolittle's patient with an injured foot
- Ginny Tyler as the voice of Polynesia, Doctor Dolittle's talking pet blue-and-yellow macaw

== Production ==
=== Development ===
As early as 1922, Fox Film Corporation made Hugh Lofting an offer for the film rights to Doctor Dolittle. Decades later, Walt Disney sought to obtain the rights to make a film adaptation of the novels. The Disney studio offered Lofting a flat fee of $7,500 for the ancillary rights to the property, and the contract negotiations reached an impasse. In 1960, Lofting's widow Josephine gave a short-term option of the film rights to Helen Winston, a Canadian actress who had produced the film Hand in Hand (1960). 20th Century Fox signed a multi-picture production deal with Winston's company, Luster Enterprises, in April 1962, with plans to commence production in the following months. Winston had actor George Gobel in mind to portray Doctor John Dolittle in the project. She had completed a script with writer Larry Watkin by June 1962, but Fox decided to cancel their option two months later.

Arthur P. Jacobs first heard that the film rights were available on December 5, 1963, which was before the release of What a Way to Go! (1964), his debut film as a producer. Jacobs met with the Loftings' attorney, Bernard Silbert, and expressed his intentions to produce Doctor Dolittle as a musical with lyricist Alan Jay Lerner and actor Rex Harrison attached. He acquired the rights on Christmas Day, with the condition that he find a distributor within six months. In January 1964, The New York Times reported that Lerner had signed on to write the script and compose the songs. That March, Jacobs pitched his project to studio executive Darryl Zanuck, and 20th Century Fox signed on as the distributor. On March 22, Rex Harrison signed to star as Doctor Dolittle. Because Lerner's collaborator Frederick Loewe had retired, Jacobs hired André Previn to compose the musical score. The film was given a budget of $6 million ($47.5 million in 2025)

After not producing a complete draft of the screenplay in over a year, Lerner, who was more focused at the time on his work on the Broadway musical On a Clear Day You Can See Forever, was fired from the Doctor Dolittle project on May 7, 1965. Jacobs considered replacing Lerner with the Sherman Brothers, who had just won the Academy Award for Best Original Song for their work on Mary Poppins (1964), but they were still under contract to Disney, so he hired Leslie Bricusse, who was in high demand after his success with the stage musical Stop the World – I Want to Get Off. Determined to make a good impression for his first screenplay commission, Bricusse proved agreeably productive from the start for Jacobs, suggesting numerous story ideas and adding female leading character Emma Fairfax to the film during their first meeting on May 6. Zanuck decided to give Bricusse a trial run, at first only hiring him to complete two songs and the first twenty pages of a script. Two weeks after he was brought on to the project, Bricusse presented the song "Talk to the Animals", which he composed especially for Harrison. By July, Bricusse had written a full script, including various song suggestions, that effectively blunted the book's racist content, and his adaptation received the approval of Josephine Lofting.

For the director, Vincente Minnelli was initially attached to the project, but left before Bricusse was hired. William Wyler, George Roy Hill, and John Huston were considered, but Richard Zanuck settled on Richard Fleischer.

=== Casting ===
Lerner's replacement by Bricusse gave Harrison the option of sitting out his contract, which gave him unusual leverage over the film. Sammy Davis Jr. was hired to play the character of Prince Bumpo, but Harrison demanded that Davis be fired from the project, as he wanted to work with "a real actor, not a song-and-dance man". Instead, Harrison suggested Sidney Poitier, despite the fact that Poitier was not a musical performer. Jacobs and Fleischer flew to New York to meet with Poitier, who accepted the part on condition that he meet with and approve of Bricusse. The producer and director then met with Davis to inform him that he would be released from his contract and, angered at the casting change, Davis threatened to go public and sue Harrison. Poitier considered leaving the project the next day, as he did not want to betray Davis, but he eventually decided to stay in the role. Just before shooting was set to commence, Fleischer and Zanuck reduced Bumpo's role, which had been drastically increased after Poitier was cast, in order to save money, and they informed Poitier that he would be released from his contract before he started filming his scenes. Geoffrey Holder was cast as his replacement in the renamed role of William Shakespeare X.

For the role of Matthew Mugg, Bing Crosby and Danny Kaye were among those on the shortlist, but Bricusse's sometime-songwriting partner Anthony Newley was ultimately cast, which angered Harrison, who had suggested David Wayne. Harrison later showed contempt for Bricusse's script and lyrics and demanded to sing live on set, rather than lip-syncing to pre-recorded tracks, and he left the project at one point. After considering Peter Ustinov, Alec Guinness, and Peter O'Toole to replace Harrison, Christopher Plummer was cast as Doctor Dolittle. When Harrison agreed to stay, the producers paid Plummer his entire agreed-upon salary to leave the production.

Harrison suggested Maggie Smith, his co-star in The Honey Pot (1967), for the role of Emma Fairfax. Barbra Streisand was approached in which her agents requested a $500,000 salary, which Darryl Zanuck found to be ridiculous. Hayley Mills was also approached, but her salary request was also too high. Mills later claimed she pulled out because her sister Juliet had wanted the role. Eventually, Samantha Eggar was cast. Eggar's singing voice was overdubbed by Diana Lee, the daughter of playback singer Bill Lee.

=== Filming ===
In June 1966, principal photography was underway, with the scenes that take place in the fictional village of Puddleby-on-the-Marsh being shot in Castle Combe, Wiltshire. All signs of modern life in Castle Combe, such as cars, television antennas, and Coca-Cola promotional signs, were removed or hidden, which irritated the locals. In an attempt to raise publicity for how the village was being treated, British Army officer (and future explorer) Ranulph Fiennes even attempted to blow up a concrete dam built by the production to block a stream. Additionally, the filmmakers did not realize that the animals trained for the production would be quarantined upon entering the United Kingdom, and, at considerable expense, they had to replace the animals to meet production deadlines. The producers ignored reports of the area's frequently rainy summers, and the weather continually interfered with shooting and caused health problems for the animals. Richard Attenborough also had to be hired to replace Hugh Griffith in the role of Albert Blossom during the shoot. Production costs soared to $15 million.

In October, the shoot moved to Marigot Bay in Saint Lucia. This location had its own issues, and problems related to insects and frequent tropical storms delayed filming and left eight crew members bedridden due to vomiting, diarrhea, and high fever. The Great Pink Sea Snail proved to be problematic not only because of its poor design, but also because the island's children had recently been struck by a gastrointestinal epidemic caused by freshwater snails; mobs of angry locals threw rocks at the large prop. Within a month, the film had fallen 39 days behind schedule, and the production crew had to decamp back to California.

After reconstructing the sets on the Fox Studio Lot in California, the production budget reached $17 million. Four months later, after principal photography was complete, Harrison insisted on re-recording his songs live on set. This infuriated conductor Lionel Newman, but he gave in to Harrison's demands, even though it meant more work for him, since the orchestral arrangements had to be added later. Filming was finished by April 1967.

==== Personality conflicts ====
Personality conflicts added to the tension on the set. Anthony Newley was incensed by comments made by Harrison that he deemed antisemitic. Harrison was apparently jealous of his Jewish co-star's participation in the project, and he demanded Newley's role be reduced and would disrupt scenes featuring Newley. Geoffrey Holder received racist abuse from Harrison's entourage. The younger cast members grew to loathe Harrison for this abuse, and they retaliated by antagonizing him.

==== Animal issues ====
Over 1,200 live animals were used in the film, all of which required understudies. There are anecdotes of a goat eating Fleischer's script, and a parrot that learned to yell "Cut!". At one point, ducks were placed in a lake, but did not have their water-repellent feathers, as it was the wrong time of year, so they began to sink, and crew members had to jump in the water to save them. Scenes featuring live sheep handled by Harrison required retakes, as they frequently urinated on him.

=== Post-production ===
The film's first test screening took place in September 1967 at the Mann Theatre in Minneapolis, and it was a failure. The audience consisted mainly of adults, who were not the primary target audience, and the general response during the screening was muted. Comment cards rated the film poorly, with frequent complaints about the length, so, in an attempt to improve the pacing, several verses were dropped from the songs, including "Beautiful Things", and the song "Where Are the Words?" was removed before the film was screened again in San Francisco. The shorter edit screened to a younger audience in a different city was no more successful, so additional edits were made, including the removal of the song "Something in Your Smile", before the film was screened in San Jose, California. This version of the film, which ran 151 minutes, was received well enough to be approved as the final cut.

In October, as the film's release date approached, Helen Winston sued 20th Century Fox for $4.5 million alleging that the plot point about animals threatening to go on strike on Dolittle's behalf was plagiarized from her screenplay. As Bricusse had read Winston's script and, assuming this idea was from one of Lofting's books, included it in his treatment, the producers had no legal defense and were forced to settle out of court. The animal strike is mentioned at the end of the movie, but was not actually filmed.

== Music ==
Doctor Dolittle Original Motion Picture Soundtrack

Soundtrack album by Various Artists
- Released: August 28, 1967
- Recorded: 1966–7
- Genre: Soundtrack
- Length: 45:18
- Label: 20th Century Fox Records

The lyrics and music for Doctor Dolittle were composed by Leslie Bricusse, and the music was scored and conducted by Lionel Newman and Alexander Courage. In the original cut of the film, Dolittle and Emma eventually begin a relationship, and he sings a song titled "Where Are the Words?" when he realizes he is falling in love with her. In a revised version, Matthew falls for Emma and sings the song, and, although the song was deleted from the film before its release, Newley's recording of the song is featured on the film's soundtrack album. The footage of both Harrison and Newley performing the song, as well as Harrison's vocal track, are lost. Another song deleted from the film is titled "Something in Your Smile", which was sung by Dolittle while writing a letter to Emma after she has returned to England. The footage of this scene is lost, but Harrison's vocal track survives.

There was an enormous media blitz surrounding the release of the film's soundtrack album, and half a million copies of the mono and stereo LP were shipped to retail stores four months before the premiere of the film. The song "Talk to the Animals" was recorded by such artists as Bobby Darin, Andy Williams, Tony Bennett, Dizzy Gillespie, Jack Jones, Herb Alpert and the Tijuana Brass and Andre Kostelanetz. Sammy Davis Jr., who had been dropped from the film, recorded an entire album of music from the film. Bobby Darin Sings Doctor Dolittle was released on Atlantic Records in August 1967, and Darin's recording of "Beautiful Things" from this LP was featured in a 2013 TV commercial for Etihad Airways. A cover version of the same song by the Shiny Lapel Trio was used in a 2008 Christmas television commercial campaign for the United States retail chain Kohl's.

Coinciding with the release of the film, Marble Arch Records issued an LP in 1967 with a studio recording of the score, with a cast including Paddy Roberts as Doctor Dolittle and Marty Wilde as Matthew Mugg.

In November 2017, a 50th Anniversary Expanded Soundtrack was released by La-La Land Records as a lavish 2-CD set that included numerous demos, rehearsal takes, and alternative versions of songs from the film.

Professional ratings
Review scores
Source	Rating
AllMusic	4/5 stars

No.	Title	Performer(s)	Length
1.	"Overture"	20th Century Fox Studio Orchestra	1:15
2.	"My Friend the Doctor"	Anthony Newley	3:27
3.	"The Vegetarian"	Rex Harrison	4:31
4.	"Talk to the Animals"	Harrison	2:48
5.	"At the Crossroads"	Samantha Eggar and Diana Lee	2:07
6.	"I've Never Seen Anything Like It"	Richard Attenborough	2:26
7.	"Beautiful Things"	Newley	4:12
8.	"When I Look in Your Eyes"	Harrison	1:47
9.	"Like Animals"	Harrison	4:09
10.	"After Today"	Newley	2:09
11.	"Fabulous Places"	Harrison, Eggar, Lee, and Newley	3:46
12.	"Where Are The Words"	Newley	3:50
13.	"I Think I Like You"	Harrison, Eggar, and Lee	2:39
14.	"Doctor Dolittle"	Newley, William Dix, and Ginny Tyler	2:31
15.	"Something in Your Smile"	Harrison	2:33
16.	"My Friend the Doctor (Finale)"	20th Century Fox Studio Orchestra & Chorus	0:56

== Release ==
The film had its official Royal World Charity Premiere on December 12, 1967, at the Odeon Marble Arch in London, with Queen Elizabeth II in attendance. On December 19, it had a reserved-seating premiere at the Loew's State Theatre in New York City. Two days later, the film opened at the Paramount Theatre in Los Angeles as a benefit for the Motion Picture Relief Fund.

=== Marketing ===
Thirteen months before the release of the film, Fox began an extensive marketing campaign to promote it. On September 30, 1966, the cover of Life magazine featured a picture of Harrison, in character as Doctor Dolittle, riding a giraffe, and inside there was an article documenting the film's production. The release was accompanied by 50 licensees ready to spend $12 million in advertising, and the 300 different promotional items related to the film were carried by 10,000 retail stores, totaling an estimated retail value of $200 million.

== Reception ==
=== Box office ===
The film faced strong competition at the box office from Disney's animated feature film The Jungle Book, which had opened to considerable critical and audience acclaim two months earlier and was still in wide release. Doctor Dolittle's appeal as family fare was undermined when the press drew attention to allegedly racist content in Lofting's books, prompting demands to have them removed from school libraries.

According to studio records, the film needed to earn $31,275,000 in rentals to break even, and by December 1970 it had only made $16.3 million. In September 1970, Fox estimated it had lost $11,141,000 on the film.

=== Critical response ===
Reviewing the film for The New York Times, Bosley Crowther said: "The music is not exceptional, the rendering of the songs lacks variety, and the pace, under Richard Fleischer's direction, is slow and without surprise." Charles Champlin of the Los Angeles Times claimed that "Doctor Dolittle, though it is beautiful, often funny, often charming, tuneful and gay, is in an odd way never really sentimentally moving, even in the sense that it sets up in us elders a yearning for lost youth. It is a picture we can greatly enjoy seeing our children enjoy, but without feeling quite at one with them." Time magazine wrote: "Somehow—with the frequent but by no means infallible exception of Walt Disney—Hollywood has never learned what so many children's book writers have known all along: size and a big budget are no substitutes for originality and charm." Robert B. Frederick of Variety acknowledged the film as an "imperfect gem", but felt "there's sufficient values going for it to survive any barbs aimed at it by the critics".

Retrospectively, in his annual Movie Guide, critic and film historian Leonard Maltin admired the film's photography, but called it a "colossal musical dud that almost ruined 20th Century-Fox studios." He concluded by admitting that "While the charm of Hugh Lofting's stories is missing, the picture does have one merit: if you have unruly children, it may put them to sleep." On the review aggregation website Rotten Tomatoes, the film has an approval rating of 29% based on 21 reviews, with an average score of 4.5/10. On Metacritic, it has a weighted average score of 34 out of 100 based on 6 critics, indicating "generally unfavorable" reviews.

=== Accolades ===
20th Century-Fox's decision to mount an Oscar campaign for Doctor Dolittle was partially due to their lackluster slate of releases during the holiday season in 1967. While it was a major commercial success, Valley of the Dolls had received a less-than-stellar critical reception. By this same time, Warner Bros. and Universal Pictures mounted extravagant Oscar campaigns for their respective musical films released in 1967: Camelot and Thoroughly Modern Millie.

As a result, in January and February 1968, Fox booked 16 consecutive nights of free screenings of Doctor Dolittle on the studio lot for members of the Academy, complete with dinner and champagne. The first seven screenings were widely attended. One guest stated afterwards: "It was all so silly. All the editors standing around, knowing they had been bought." Thanks to the studio's efforts, the film received nine Academy Award nominations.

Award	Category	Nominee(s)	Result
Academy Awards	Best Picture	Arthur P. Jacobs	Nominated
Academy Awards	Best Art Direction	Art Direction: Mario Chiari, Jack Martin Smith, and Ed Graves; Set Decoration: Walter M. Scott and Stuart A. Reiss	Nominated
Academy Awards	Best Cinematography	Robert L. Surtees	Nominated
Academy Awards	Best Film Editing	Samuel E. Beetley and Marjorie Fowler	Nominated
Academy Awards	Best Original Music Score	Leslie Bricusse	Nominated
Academy Awards	Best Original Song Score or Adaptation Score	Lionel Newman and Alexander Courage	Nominated
Academy Awards	Best Song	"Talk to the Animals"; Music and Lyrics by Leslie Bricusse	Won
Academy Awards	Best Sound	20th Century Fox Studio Sound Department	Nominated
Academy Awards	Best Special Visual Effects	L. B. Abbott	Won
American Cinema Editors Awards	Best Edited Feature Film	Samuel E. Beetley and Marjorie Fowler	Nominated
Genesis Awards (1996)	Best Feature Film – Classic	Doctor Dolittle	Won
Golden Globe Awards	Best Motion Picture – Musical or Comedy	Doctor Dolittle	Nominated
Golden Globe Awards	Best Actor in a Motion Picture – Musical or Comedy	Rex Harrison	Nominated
Golden Globe Awards	Best Supporting Actor – Motion Picture	Richard Attenborough	Won
Golden Globe Awards	Best Original Score – Motion Picture	Leslie Bricusse	Nominated
Golden Globe Awards	Best Original Song – Motion Picture	"Talk to the Animals"; Music and Lyrics by Leslie Bricusse	Nominated
Grammy Awards	Best Original Score Written for a Motion Picture or Television Show	Leslie Bricusse	Nominated
Motion Picture Sound Editors Awards	Best Sound Editing – Dialogue	Doctor Dolittle	Won
National Board of Review Awards	Top Ten Films	Doctor Dolittle	7th Place
Writers Guild of America Awards	Best Written American Musical	Leslie Bricusse	Nominated

The film was recognized by American Film Institute in these lists:

- 2004: AFI's 100 Years...100 Songs:
  - "Talk to the Animals" – Nominated

== Stage adaptation ==
In 1998, the film was adapted into a stage musical. The show, which was, at the time, one of the most expensive stage musicals ever produced, ran for 400 performances in London's West End. It starred Phillip Schofield as Doctor Dolittle and Bryan Smyth as Matthew, and featured a pre-recorded Julie Andrews as the voice of Dolittle's parrot Polynesia and the animatronics of Jim Henson's Creature Shop.

== See also ==
- List of American films of 1967

== Bibliography ==
- Harris, Mark (2008). Pictures at A Revolution: Five Movies and the Birth of a New Hollywood. New York: Penguin Press. ISBN 978-0-143-11503-8.
- Kennedy, Matthew (2014). Roadshow!: The Fall of Film Musicals in the 1960s. Oxford, England: Oxford University Press. ISBN 978-0-199-92567-4.
- Medved, Harry; Medved, Michael (1984). The Hollywood Hall of Shame: The Most Expensive Flops in Movie History. Angus & Robertson. ISBN 0-207-14929-1.
- Robey, Tim (2024). Box Office Poison: Hollywood's Story in a Century of Flops. Hanover Square Press. ISBN 978-1-335-14731-8.
- Solomon, Aubrey (1989). Twentieth Century Fox: A Corporate and Financial History (The Scarecrow Filmmakers Series). Lanham, Maryland: Scarecrow Press. ISBN 978-0-810-84244-1.
