= Doctor Dolittle in the Moon =

Eighth work of Doctor Dolittle Books, written by Hugh Lofting

- First edition
- Author: Hugh Lofting
- Language: English
- Series: Doctor Dolittle
- Genre: Children's novel
- Publisher: Frederick A. Stokes
- Publication date: 1928
- Publication place: United Kingdom
- Media type: Print (hardback & paperback)
- Preceded by: Doctor Dolittle's Garden
- Followed by: Doctor Dolittle's Return

Doctor Dolittle in the Moon is a 1928 children's book by Hugh Lofting. The book tells the story of Doctor Dolittle who studies mystical animals and plants on the Moon. While on his adventure, his friends on Earth long for his return home.

== Plot ==
Doctor Dolittle has landed on the Moon and is discovering new things each day. He meets Otho Bludge the Moon Man, a Stone Age artist who was the only human on the Moon when it broke away from the Earth. The animals of the Moon flock to Doctor Dolittle, and he discovers how to communicate with the intelligent plants there.

== Themes ==
There is no pretence that the Lunar environment, described in meticulous detail, conforms to what was known to science at the time of writing; thus, the book can be considered as fantasy more than science fiction.

Dr. Dolittle in the Moon includes an early presentation of the concept of "ecology", though it did not use that term. Dr. Dolittle helps guide the Lunar Council, headed by Otho Bludge, negotiate how many seeds each person can legally produce each year.
