= Doctor Dolittle =

Character from novels by Hugh Lofting

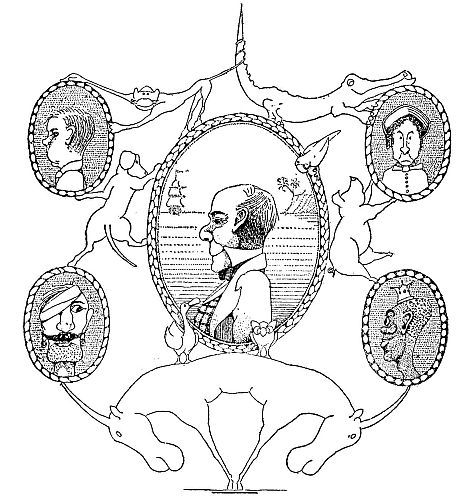
- Portrait from the title page of The Story of Doctor Dolittle
- First appearance: The Story of Doctor Dolittle (1920)
- Created by: Hugh Lofting
- Portrayed by: Rex Harrison (1967); Eddie Murphy (1998–2001); Robert Downey Jr. (2020)
- Voiced by: Bob Holt (1970–1971); John Stephenson (The Voyages of Dr. Dolittle, 1984)

In-universe information
- Alias: King Jong Thinkalot
- Gender: Male
- Occupation: Doctor, naturalist
- Family: Lisa Dolittle (wife, 1998 series); Charisse Dolittle (daughter, 1998 series); Maya Dolittle (daughter, 1998 series); Lily Dolittle (wife, 2020 film)
- Relatives: Sarah Dolittle (sister); Archer Dolittle (father, 1998 series)
- Nationality: British; American (1998–2001)

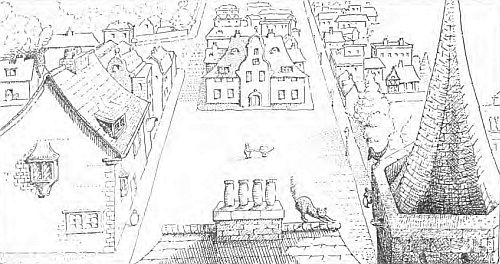
Puddleby-on-the-Marsh

Doctor John Dolittle is the central character of a series of children's books by Hugh Lofting starting with the 1920 The Story of Doctor Dolittle. He is a physician who shuns human patients in favour of animals, with whom he can speak in their own languages. He later becomes a naturalist, using his abilities to speak with animals to better understand nature and the history of the world.

Doctor Dolittle first appeared in the author's illustrated letters to his children, written from the trenches during World War I when actual news, he later said, was either too horrible or too dull. The stories are set in early Victorian England, where Doctor John Dolittle lives in the fictional English village of Puddleby-on-the-Marsh in the West Country.

Doctor Dolittle has a few close human friends, including his young assistant Tommy Stubbins, and Matthew Mugg, the Cats'-Meat Man. The animal team includes Polynesia (a parrot), Gub-Gub (a pig), Jip (a dog), Dab-Dab (a duck), Chee-Chee (a monkey), Too-Too (an owl), the Pushmi-pullyu, and a white mouse later named simply "Whitey". Later on, in the 1925 novel Doctor Dolittle's Zoo, Whitey founds (with the doctor's help) the Rat and Mouse Club, whose membership eventually reaches some 5,000 rats and mice.

== Inspiration ==
One inspiration for his character appears to be the Scottish surgeon John Hunter.

== Stories ==
The Voyages of Doctor Dolittle

The Story of Doctor Dolittle: Being the History of His Peculiar Life at Home and Astonishing Adventures in Foreign Parts Never Before Printed (1920) begins the series. The sequel The Voyages of Doctor Dolittle (1922) won the prestigious Newbery Medal. The next three, Doctor Dolittle's Post Office (1923), Doctor Dolittle's Circus (1924), and Doctor Dolittle's Caravan (1926) take place during and/or after the events of The Story of Doctor Dolittle. Five more novels followed, and after Lofting's death in 1947, two more volumes of short, previously unpublished pieces appeared.

The stories, in order of publication, are:

1. The Story of Doctor Dolittle (1920)
2. The Voyages of Doctor Dolittle (1922)
3. Doctor Dolittle's Post Office (1923)
4. Doctor Dolittle's Circus (1924)
5. "Doctor Dolittle Meets a Londoner in Paris" (1925)
6. Doctor Dolittle's Zoo (1925)
7. Doctor Dolittle's Caravan (1926)
8. Doctor Dolittle's Garden (1927)
9. Doctor Dolittle in the Moon (1928)
10. Gub Gub's Book: An Encyclopedia of Food (1932)
11. Doctor Dolittle's Return (1933)
12. Doctor Dolittle's Birthday Book (1936)
13. Doctor Dolittle and the Secret Lake (copyrighted 1923, but not published until 1948)
14. Doctor Dolittle and the Green Canary (1950)
15. Doctor Dolittle's Puddleby Adventures (1952)
  - "The Sea Dog"
  - "Dapple"
  - "The Dog Ambulance"
  - "The Stunned Man"
  - "The Crested Screamers"
  - "The Green Breasted Martins"
  - "The Story of the Maggot"
  - "The Lost Boy"

Gub Gub's Book: An Encyclopedia of Food (1932) is purportedly written by the pig Gub-Gub. It is a series of food-themed animal vignettes. In the text, the pretence of Gub-Gub's authorship is dropped; Tommy Stubbins, Dr. Dolittle's assistant, explains that he is reporting a series of Gub-Gub's discourses to the other animals of the Dolittle household around the evening fire. Stubbins also says that the full version of Gub-Gub's encyclopaedia, which was an immense and poorly-organized collection of scribblings written by the pig in a language for pigs invented by Dr. Dolittle, was too long to translate into English.

Doctor Dolittle's Birthday Book (1936) is a little day-book illustrated with pictures and quotations from the earlier stories. It appeared between Doctor Dolittle's Return and Doctor Dolittle and the Secret Lake.

"Doctor Dolittle Meets a Londoner in Paris" is a short story included in The Flying Carpet, pp. 110–19 (1925), an anthology of children's short stories and poems with illustrations by Cynthia Asquith.

The character entered public domain in the 1990s, which allowed for the legal creation of derivative works based on it without the need to acquire permission from the Lofting estate, which was required previously. For example, in April 2021, the Japanese biologist Shinichi Fukuoka created a new story Dr. Dolittle Saves Galápagos Islands which appeared in The Asahi Shimbun.

== Chronology ==
The main events of The Story of Doctor Dolittle take place in 1819 or 1820, although the events of the early chapters seem to be spread over several years. The Voyages of Doctor Dolittle begins in 1839.

Dolittle returned from his journey to the moon in Doctor Dolittle's return during a full lunar eclipse that was visible low in the sky one late evening in spring. This was the first full lunar eclipse for a couple of years, and it took place in May 1844 in real life.

Backstory references indicate that Dr. Dolittle travelled to the North Pole in April 1809, and already knew how to speak to some species of animals at that date, suggesting that the early chapters of The Story of Doctor Dolittle take place before that date. However, it is possible that the internal chronology is not consistent.

The internal chronology of the books is somewhat different from the publishing order. The first book is followed by Doctor Dolittle's Circus (1924), Doctor Dolittle's Caravan (1926), and Doctor Dolittle and the Green Canary (1950). Only then follows the second book, The Voyages of Doctor Dolittle (1922), continued by Doctor Dolittle's Zoo (1925). After that, the publishing order is restored; Doctor Dolittle's Garden (1927) is followed by Doctor Dolittle in the Moon (1928) and Doctor Dolittle's Return (1933), ending with Doctor Dolittle and the Secret Lake (1948).

Doctor Dolittle's Post Office (1923) can't be placed anywhere in the internal chronology without creating contradictions. Doctor Dolittle's Circus contains references to events that occurred in Post Office, indicating that Post Office must precede Circus. But the Prologue of Post Office indicates just as definitely that it must happen sometime after Circus. Furthermore, in the narrative sequence that stretches from the end of the first book, through Circus and Caravan, to Green Canary, there's no gap into which Post Office could be inserted. For the sake of a reading order, the most logical options are to place Post Office immediately before Circus, or immediately after Green Canary.

The stories, in order of internal chronology, are:

- The Story of Doctor Dolittle (1920)

- "The Green Breasted Martins" (follows Chapter XII in The Story of Doctor Dolittle; collected in Doctor Dolittle's Puddleby Adventures (1952))

- Doctor Dolittle's Circus (1924)
- Doctor Dolittle's Caravan (1926)

- "The Crested Screamers" (takes place within Part One, Chapter 12 of Doctor Dolittle's Caravan; collected in Doctor Dolittle's Puddleby Adventures (1952))
- "The Lost Boy" (takes place within Part One, Chapter 12 of Doctor Dolittle's Caravan; collected in Doctor Dolittle's Puddleby Adventures (1952))

- Doctor Dolittle and the Green Canary (1950)

- "Doctor Dolittle Meets a Londoner in Paris" (1925 – uncollected)

- Doctor Dolittle's Post Office (1923)
- The Voyages of Doctor Dolittle (1922)
- Doctor Dolittle's Zoo (1925)
- Doctor Dolittle's Garden (1927)

- "The Sea Dog" (takes place at the beginning of Doctor Dolittle's Garden; collected in Doctor Dolittle's Puddleby Adventures (1952))
- "Dapple" (takes place at the beginning of Doctor Dolittle's Garden; collected in Doctor Dolittle's Puddleby Adventures (1952))
- "The Dog Ambulance" (takes place at the beginning of Doctor Dolittle's Garden; collected in Doctor Dolittle's Puddleby Adventures (1952))
- "The Stunned Man" (takes place at the beginning of Doctor Dolittle's Garden; collected in Doctor Dolittle's Puddleby Adventures (1952))
- "The Story of the Maggot" (given a greatly reduced summary at the conclusion to early printings of Part Two, Chapter 4 of Doctor Dolittle's Garden; collected in Doctor Dolittle's Puddleby Adventures (1952))

- Gub Gub's Book: An Encyclopaedia of Food (1932)
- Doctor Dolittle in the Moon (1928)
- Doctor Dolittle's Return (1933)
- Doctor Dolittle's Birthday Book (1936)
- Doctor Dolittle and the Secret Lake (copyrighted 1923, but not published until 1948)

== Adaptations ==
There have been a number of adaptations of the Doctor Dolittle stories in other media:

Audio:

- 1933–1934: NBC radio series
- 1995–2001: BBC audio books read by Alan Bennett

Stages

- 1973: stage adaptation by the Philadelphia Boys Choir & Chorale, which was used during their concert tour to Belgium and Kenya
- 1998: Doctor Dolittle stage musical by Leslie Bricusse, based on the 1967 film musical.
- 2007: stage musical adaptation by TheatreWorksUSA, written by Randy Courts and Mark St. Germain

Film:

- 1967: Doctor Dolittle, starring Rex Harrison
- 1998: Dr. Dolittle and its sequels: Dr. Dolittle 2 (2001), Dr. Dolittle 3 (2006), Dr. Dolittle: Tail to the Chief (2008), and Dr. Dolittle: Million Dollar Mutts (2009). The first two star Eddie Murphy in the title role, whereas all five star Kyla Pratt as his daughter, Maya. Norm Macdonald appears in each film as the voice of their dog, Lucky. Note the Eddie Murphy/Kyla Pratt films are modernizations.
- 2020: Dolittle, a live action adaptation starring Robert Downey Jr., Michael Sheen, and Antonio Banderas.

Animation:

- 1928: Doktor Dolittle und seine Tiere (Doctor Dolittle and his Animals), a silent animated short in German by Lotte Reiniger
- 1970–1972: Doctor Dolittle animated TV series, produced at DePatie-Freleng Enterprises for 20th Century Fox Television
- 1984: The Voyages of Doctor Dolittle (ドリトルせんせいものがたり) (U.S.-Japan coproduction, not aired in Japan until 1997)
- 2011: The Voyages of Young Doctor Dolittle direct-to-video animated film, starring Jane Seymour, Jason Alexander, and Tim Curry
- Dr. Dolittle, an upcoming animated feature film currently in development by the Russian animation studio Voronezh Animation.

Video games:

- 2006: Dr. Dolittle PS2 video game produced by Aqua Pacific and distributed by Blast! Entertainment Ltd.

== Appearances in other languages ==
A Russian children's novel Doctor Aybolit (Doctor Oh-it-hurts) by Korney Chukovsky (first published in 1924) was loosely based on the stories of Doctor Dolittle. The original novel credited Lofting's work, as did Chukovsky in his memoirs.

Norwegian playwright, songwriter, and illustrator Thorbjørn Egner made an album called Doktor Dyregod (Doctor good-toward-animals) with songs and story based on Doctor Dolittle.

All the books in the series have been translated into Japanese by Masuji Ibuse and into Lithuanian by Pranas Mašiotas.

== See also ==
- List of Doctor Dolittle characters
