= The Story of Doctor Dolittle =

1920 novel by Hugh Lofting

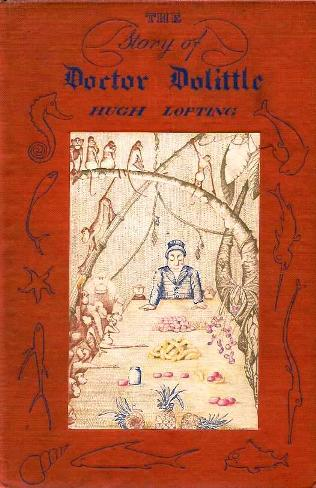
- First edition
- Author: Hugh Lofting
- Original title: The Story of Doctor Dolittle: Being the History of his Peculiar Life at Home and Astonishing Adventures in Foreign Parts
- Illustrator: Hugh Lofting
- Cover artist: Hugh Lofting
- Language: English
- Series: Doctor Dolittle
- Genre: Fantasy, children's novel
- Publisher: Frederick A. Stokes
- Publication date: October 25, 1920
- Publication place: United States
- Media type: Print
- Pages: 180
- Followed by: The Voyages of Doctor Dolittle
- Text: The Story of Doctor Dolittle at Wikisource

The Story of Doctor Dolittle, Being the History of His Peculiar Life at Home and Astonishing Adventures in Foreign Parts (1920), written and illustrated by the British author Hugh Lofting, is the first of his Doctor Dolittle books, a series of children's novels about a man who learns to talk to animals and becomes their champion around the world. It was one of the novels in the series which was adapted into the 1967 film Doctor Dolittle.

== Plot ==
John Dolittle, MD, is a respected physician and quiet bachelor living with his spinster sister Sarah in the small English village of Puddleby-on-the-Marsh. His love of animals grows over the years and his household menagerie eventually scares off his human clientele, leading to loss of wealth. But after learning the secret of speaking to all animals from his parrot Polynesia, he takes up veterinary practice.

His fortunes rise and fall again after a crocodile takes up residence, leading to his sister leaving in disgust with the intention of getting married, but his fame in the animal kingdom spreads throughout the world. He is conscripted into voyaging to Africa to cure a monkey epidemic just as he faces bankruptcy. He has to borrow supplies and a ship, and sails with a crew of his favourite animals, but is shipwrecked upon arriving in Africa. On the way to the monkey kingdom, his band is arrested by the king of Jolliginki, a victim of European exploitation who wants no white men travelling in his country.

The band barely escapes by ruse, but makes it to the monkey kingdom where things are dire indeed as a result of the raging epidemic. He vaccinates the well monkeys and nurses the sick back to health. In appreciation, the monkeys find the pushmi-pullyu, a shy two-headed gazelle-unicorn cross, whose rarity may bring Dr. Dolittle money back home.

On the return trip, they again are captured in Jolliginki. This time they escape with the help of Prince Bumpo, who gives them a ship in exchange for Dolittle's bleaching Bumpo's face white, his greatest desire being to act as a European fairy-tale prince. Dolittle's crew then have a couple of run-ins with pirates, leading to Dolittle's winning a pirate ship loaded with treasures and rescuing a boy whose uncle was abandoned on a rock island. After reuniting the two, Dolittle finally makes it home and tours with the pushmi-pullyu in a circus until he makes enough money to retire to his beloved home in Puddleby.

== Publication ==
Although the book's author was British, it was published in the US by Frederick A. Stokes on October 25, 1920 before being published in the UK by Cape in 1924.

== Reception ==
The book has been popular, with numerous new editions and translations, and received critical praise, with reviewers and educators calling it “classic” and “a work of genius.” At the same time, in the late 20th century, it has been criticized for its colonial-era themes, in particular, racist depiction of Africans, which led to later editions being rewritten to address some of these concerns.

== Analysis ==
=== Educational themes ===
The book has been praised for its educational messages related to anti-consumerism and environmentalism, in particular in the context of and empathy and care for animals.

=== Racism ===
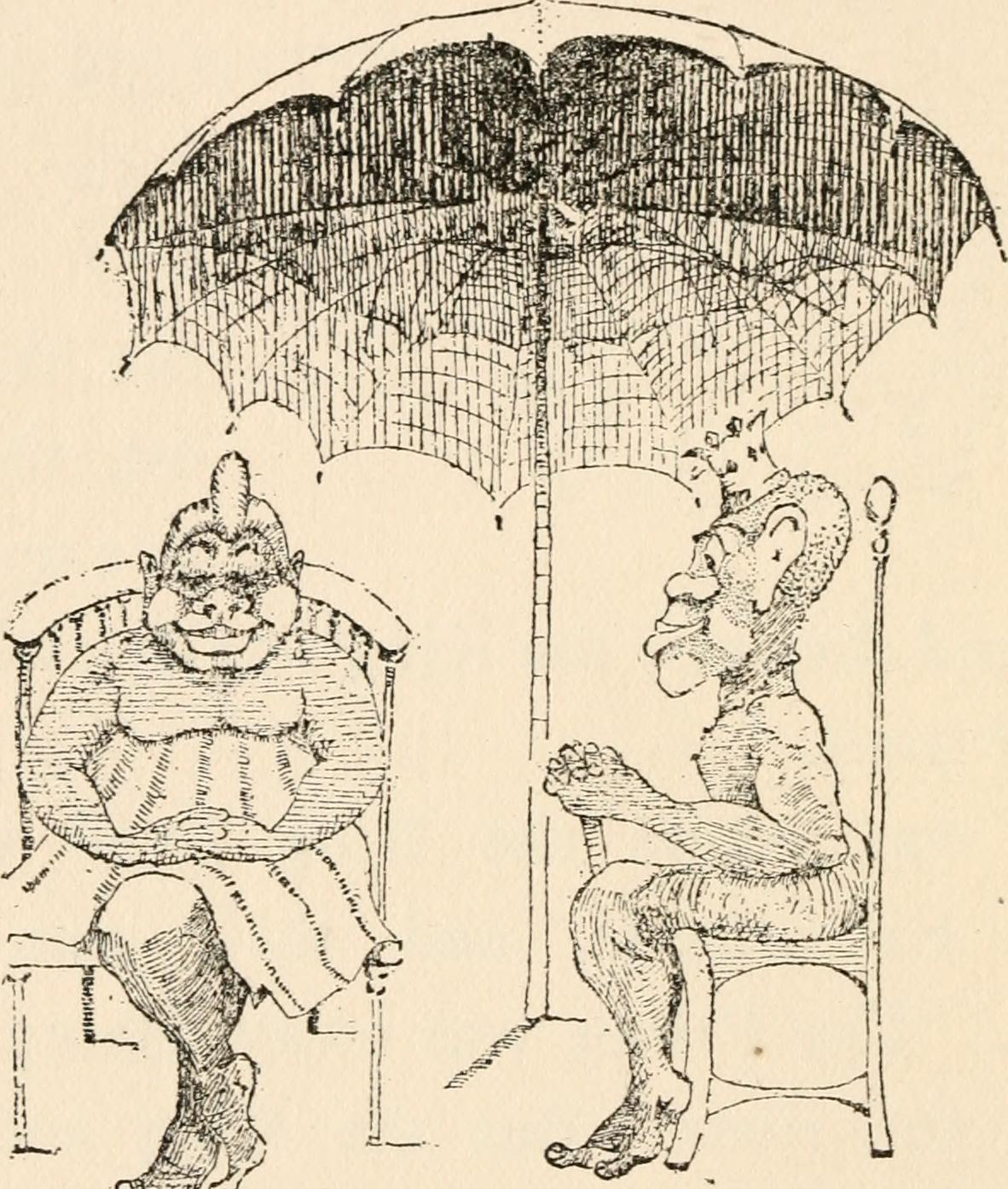
One of the images from the 1920 edition of the book, later criticized as racist.

The book has been criticized for its colonial-era terminology, which has been since late 20th century described as racist. The book contains several racial slurs and a skin whitening subplot. Lofting's illustrations of Africans which were used for most early editions are also seen today as racial caricatures. New York librarian Isabelle Suhl in 1968 claimed that Doctor Dolittle was "the personification of The Great White Father Nobly Bearing the White Man's Burden and that his creator was a white racist and chauvinist, guilty of almost every prejudice known to modern white Western man".

Later editions of the books were edited to address some of these concerns, after Lofting's estate authorized a number of changes in 1988. When Dell Publishing issued Lofting centenary editions of the books in 1988, the slurs and colorist subplot were removed. Such practices, however, have been also described as a form of book censorship motivated by political correctness. Some modern translations of the book use the original text rather than a modified version, due to reasons ranging from lack of awareness that other versions exist, cost saving (original version is now in the public domain, unlike the modified ones), or publisher conscious preference for the unmodified version (often in the context of rejection of censorship and political correctness).

Despite such changes, the book is still seen as suffering from other problems which are impossible to address, such as the very plot of Dolittle being invited to Africa to fix the problems that the natives cannot, as well as stereotypical portrayal of natives as backward and superstitious.
