= The Voyages of Doctor Dolittle =

1922 novel by Hugh Lofting

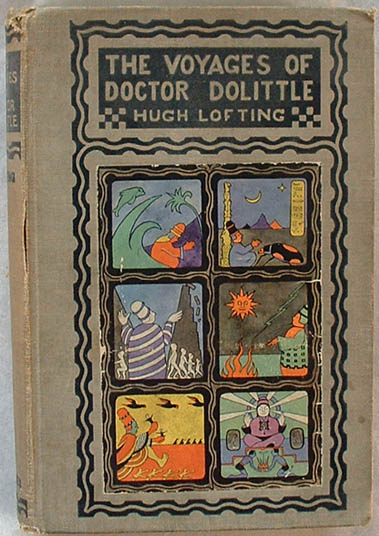
- Author: Hugh Lofting
- Illustrator: Hugh Lofting
- Cover artist: Hugh Lofting
- Language: English
- Series: Doctor Dolittle
- Genre: Children's novel, animals
- Publisher: J. B. Lippincott & Co.
- Publication date: 1922
- Publication place: United States of America
- Media type: Print (hardback and paperback)
- Pages: 364
- Preceded by: The Story of Doctor Dolittle
- Followed by: Doctor Dolittle's Post Office

The Voyages of Doctor Dolittle is the second of Hugh Lofting's Doctor Dolittle books. Published in 1922, the writing style is aimed at a more mature audience and features more sophisticated illustrations than its predecessor. The novel's scope is vast; it is nearly five times as long as its predecessor and is divided into six parts. It won the Newbery Medal for 1923.

Along with other novels in the series, it was adapted into the 1967 film Doctor Dolittle.

== Plot ==
In England, Tommy Stubbins (the narrator) finds a squirrel injured by a hawk. Matthew Mugg, the Cat's-Meat Man, suggests he seek help from Doctor Dolittle, who can speak to animals. The Doctor is away on a voyage, but when he returns, he attends the squirrel.

Tommy is introduced to some of the strange animals in Dolittle's care, such as the Wiff-Waff fish, and those who care for his household, such as Dab-Dab the duck, and Jip the dog. Polynesia the parrot, who arrives in Puddleby from Africa, informs the Doctor that Bumpo is studying in Bullford. Tommy begins his studies with Dolittle, or rather with Polynesia, who teaches Tommy the language of animals. Chee-Chee comes from Africa disguised as a lady and tells Puddleby about his voyage.

The Doctor acquires The Curlew and is thinking of taking Tommy, Polynesia, and Luke the Hermit. They find out from the Hermit's dog, Bob, that Luke was sent to prison for murder. During court proceedings, Dolittle proves to the judge he can talk to animals by talking to Bob, an animal witness, and translates Bob's story to English. The Hermit is then acquitted by the jury.

Later, the Purple Bird of Paradise informs the Doctor that Long Arrow, son of Golden Arrow (a friend of the Doctor) is missing. They play the game Blind Travel, which would determine where in the world they would voyage. They decide to take a trip to Spider Monkey Island to find Long Arrow.

The Doctor, Tommy, Bumpo, and Polynesia start the voyage across the sea, but they discover stowaways and leave them at Penzance. They subsequently stop in the Capa Blanca islands of Spain. The Doctor makes a deal with the bullfighters that if he can win a fight against them, they will stop bullfighting. Bumpo makes a side bet of 3,000 pesetas that the Doctor will win. The Doctor talks to the bulls and they agreed to stick to the plan to make everyone think that he outwitted them. When the fight is over and the doctor wins against the other bullfighters, the crew resumes their voyage. The Doctor shows Tommy he has caught a fidget that talks English, so he consults it and realizes that if he goes deeper, he will find the Great Glass Sea Snail.

A storm wrecks the ship, leaving Tommy alone. The Purple Bird of Paradise tells him that his friends are on Spider Monkey Island. With the help of some porpoises, Tommy reaches the island and the crew. Dolittle learns after catching a Jabizri, a rare beetle, that Long Arrow is stuck inside Hawk's Head Mountain. They try to find an opening, but they fail. They use the Jabizri to locate it. When they find a slab in the mountain, they dig under it until it collapses, and Long Arrow is free.

The Doctor learns from the people of the island that the island is moving southward and is about to perish, so the Doctor asks some whales to push it back to South America. After this, the Doctor is told by the Popsipetels, the people of the island, that they will be attacked soon by their rivals the Bag-jagderags. The Doctor uses the birds of the island as well as the Popsipetels to battle the Bag-jagderags. The Doctor and his army win. The people then decide to crown him king. For many months, the doctor rules the island and makes good changes for the Popsipetels.

Polynesia finds the Great Glass Sea Snail and brings her to Dolittle. He talks to the Great Glass Sea Snail and learns that it is because of the island colliding with South America that it ends up on the shores of Spider Monkey Island. The Doctor, Polynesia, Tommy, Bumpo, Chee-Chee and Jip leave Spider Monkey Island. They journey to England through the ocean in the shell of the Great Glass Sea Snail. They return to Puddleby, and, at the doctor's house, Dab-Dab says they are just in time for tea.

== Characters ==
- Tommy Stubbins – narrator of the story who becomes Doctor Dolittle's assistant.
- Doctor Dolittle – the Doctor who can talk to animals.
- Mathew Mugg – the cat's meat man who knows everyone in Puddleby.
- Joe – the man who finds Tommy and Doctor Dolittle a boat for their journey.
- Luke the Hermit – a man accused of murder before he joins the Doctor's voyage.
- Chee-Chee – a chimp who comes from Africa and is a friend of the Doctor.
- Dab-Dab – a duck who is the Doctor's housekeeper.
- Bumpo – an African prince who comes to England to study.
- Long Arrow – a naturalist who goes missing on Spidermonkey Island.
- Jip – the Doctor's dog.
- Polynesia – A West African parrot who understands and speaks English. She is also Doctor Dolittle's best friend that taught him bird language.
- Bob – Luke the Hermit's dog who claims his innocence.
- The Great Glass Sea Snail – the giant snail who takes the Doctor and his crew in its shell back to England.
- Colonel Bellowes – a snobby man who briefly appears at the beginning of the book.
- Miranda – beautiful Purple Bird-Of-Paradise from Peru.
- Jabizri - A beetle with a note attached on it from Long Arrow. The beetle also led Doctor Dolittle and his crew to the cave where Long Arrow was trapped.

== Reception ==
The book has been popular, like many others from the series. It won the Newbery Medal for 1923.

It has however been criticized for its stereotypical portrayal of natives and reproducing the noble savage stereotype.

== See also ==
- Doctor Aybolit

Awards
Preceded by The Story of Mankind	Newbery Medal recipient 1923	Succeeded by The Dark Frigate
