= Hugh Lofting =

English-American children's writer (1886–1947)

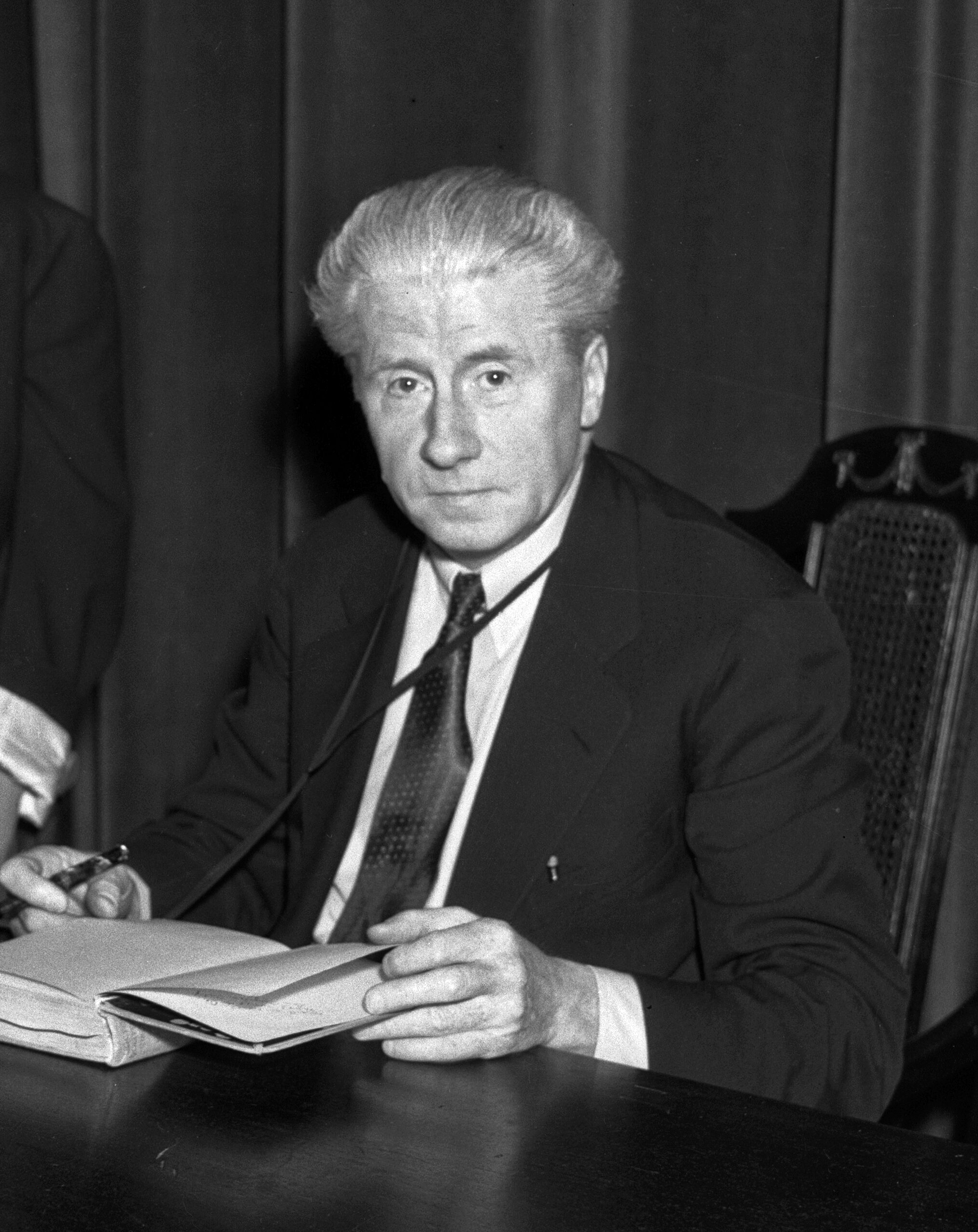
- Lofting in 1935
- Born: Hugh John Lofting; 14 January 1886; Maidenhead, Berkshire, England
- Died: 26 September 1947 (aged 61); Topanga, California, US
- Resting place: Evergreen Cemetery, Killingworth, Connecticut, US
- Occupations: Novelist, poet
- Spouses: Flora Werner Small (m. 1912; died 1928) Katherine Ganson Harrower (m. 1928; died 1929) Josephine Fricker (m. 1935)
- Children: 3
- Writing career
- Genres: Children's literature, fantasy
- Notable work: Doctor Dolittle series
- Notable awards: Newbery Medal; 1923

Hugh John Lofting (14 January 1886 – 26 September 1947) was an English-American writer, trained as a civil engineer, who created the classic children's literature character Doctor Dolittle. The fictional physician talking to animals, based in an English village, first appeared in illustrated letters to his children which Lofting sent from British Army trenches in the First World War. Lofting settled in the United States soon after the war and before his first book was published.

== Personal life ==
Lofting was born on 14 January 1886 in Maidenhead, Berkshire, to Elizabeth Agnes (Gannon) and John Brien Lofting, and was of English and Irish ancestry. His eldest brother, Hilary Lofting, later became a novelist in Australia, having emigrated there in 1915.

Lofting was educated at Mount St Mary's College in Spinkhill, Derbyshire. From 1905 to 1906 he studied civil engineering at the Massachusetts Institute of Technology in Cambridge, Massachusetts.

Lofting travelled widely as a civil engineer before enlisting in the Irish Guards regiment of the British Army in the First World War. Not wishing to write to his children about the brutal war, he wrote imaginative letters that later became the foundations for his Doctor Dolittle novels for children. Seriously wounded in the war, he emigrated with his family to Killingworth, Connecticut, in 1919. He was married three times and had three children, one of whom, his son Christopher, became the executor of his literary estate.

Lofting died on 26 September 1947 at his home in Topanga, California from cirrhosis of the liver. He is buried at Evergreen Cemetery in Killingworth, Middlesex County, Connecticut.

== Doctor Dolittle ==
The Voyages of Doctor Dolittle

Hugh Lofting's character Doctor John Dolittle, an English physician who lives in the fictional town of Puddleby-on-the-Marsh in the West Country and can speak to animals, first saw light in illustrated letters written to his children from the trenches, when actual news, he later said, was too horrible or too dull. The stories are set in England in the 1820s–1840s – The Voyages of Doctor Dolittle gives a date of 1839.

The Story of Doctor Dolittle: Being the History of His Peculiar Life at Home and Astonishing Adventures in Foreign Parts Never Before Printed (1920) began the series and won a posthumous Lewis Carroll Shelf Award in 1958. Its first sequel, The Voyages of Doctor Dolittle (1922) won a Newbery Medal. Eight novels completed by Lofting followed and two more books were edited after his death.

== Other works for children ==
The Story of Mrs Tubbs (1923) and Tommy, Tilly, and Mrs. Tubbs (1936) are picture books aimed at a younger audience than the Doctor Dolittle books. They tell of the old woman and her pets, with whom she can speak, and the animals who help her out of trouble.

Porridge Poetry (1924) is the only non-Dolittle work by Lofting still in print. It is a colourfully illustrated book of lighthearted poems for children.

Noisy Nora (1929) is a cautionary tale about a girl who is a noisy eater. The book is printed as if handwritten, and the many illustrations often merge with the text.

The Twilight of Magic (1930) is aimed at older readers. It is set in an age when magic is dying and science is beginning. This work is the only one of Lofting's books to have been illustrated by another person: Lois Lenski.

== Victory for the Slain ==
Victory for the Slain (1942), Lofting's only work for adults, consists of a single long poem in seven parts about the futility of war, permeated by the refrain "In war the only victors are the slain". It appeared only in the United Kingdom.

== Published books ==
Lofting commented: "For years it was a constant source of shock to me to find my writings amongst 'juveniles'. It does not bother me any more now, but I still feel there should be a category of 'seniles' to offset the epithet."

Doctor Dolittle

- The Story of Doctor Dolittle (1920)
- The Voyages of Doctor Dolittle (1922)
- Doctor Dolittle's Post Office (1923)
- Doctor Dolittle's Circus (1924)
- Doctor Dolittle's Zoo (1925)
- Doctor Dolittle's Caravan (1926)
- Doctor Dolittle's Garden (1927)
- Doctor Dolittle in the Moon (1928)
- Gub Gub's Book: An Encyclopedia of Food (1932)
- Doctor Dolittle's Return (1933)
- Doctor Dolittle's Birthday Book (1936)
- Doctor Dolittle and the Secret Lake (1948)
- Doctor Dolittle and the Green Canary (1950)
- Doctor Dolittle's Puddleby Adventures (1952)

Other

- The Story of Mrs Tubbs (1923)
- Porridge Poetry (1924)
- Noisy Nora (1929)
- The Twilight of Magic (1930)
- Tommy, Tilly, and Mrs. Tubbs (1936)
- Victory for the Slain (1942)

== See also ==
Awards
Preceded by Hendrik Willem Van Loon	Newbery Medal winner 1923	Succeeded by Charles Hawes
