= Cal Brunker =

Canadian animator and filmmaker

- Occupations: Animator; storyboard artist; screenwriter; film director; film producer
- Years active: 2002–present

Cal Brunker is a Canadian animator, storyboard artist, and filmmaker. He is best known for directing The Weinstein Company's animated film Escape from Planet Earth (2013), The Nut Job 2: Nutty by Nature (2017), Nickelodeon's Paw Patrol: The Movie (2021) and its sequels Paw Patrol: The Mighty Movie (2023) and Paw Patrol: The Dino Movie (2026), all of which he co-wrote with his business partner Bob Barlen.

== Career ==
Cal Brunker has frequently collaborated with his partner Bob Barlen since 2009's Ollie & the Baked Halibut. Before his directorial debut with Ninjamaica and then 2013's Escape from Planet Earth, Brunker has worked as a storyboard artist and an animator on films such as Looney Tunes: Back in Action, Horton Hears a Who!, and Despicable Me. He directed films such as Escape from Planet Earth and The Nut Job 2: Nutty by Nature. Brunker and Barlen have written screenplays for Arctic Dogs, Cranston Academy: Monster Zone, and The Son of Bigfoot in which they co-executive produced.

He also directed the film Paw Patrol: The Movie, a feature film adaptation of the Nick Jr. Channel's Paw Patrol animated series. Serving as the director and co-writer and once more collaborating with Barlen alongside Billy Frolick, it was produced by Spin Master and Nickelodeon Movies, and released by Paramount Pictures in August 2021.

By May 2026, Brunker wrote the screenplay for Doctor Dolittle: King of the Wild, an animated reimagining of the Dr. Dolittle franchise, for Sycamore Studios.

== Filmography ==
=== Film ===
Year	Title	Role
2003	Looney Tunes: Back in Action	Clean-up in-between artist
2005	Kronk's New Groove	Animator; Direct-to-video
2008	Horton Hears a Who!	Storyboard artist
2009	Ice Age: Dawn of the Dinosaurs	Storyboard artist
2009	9	Storyboard artist
2009	Ollie and the Baked Halibut	Animator; Short film
2010	Jonah Hex	Pre-visualization
2010	Despicable Me	Storyboard artist
2012	Ice Age: Continental Drift	Additional storyboard artist
2013	Escape from Planet Earth	Director; Writer (with Bob Barlen)
2015	Minions	Additional storyboard artist
2016	Ratchet & Clank	Storyboard artist Designer
2016	The Secret Life of Pets	Storyboard artist
2017	The Son of Bigfoot	Writer & co-executive producers (with Bob Barlen)
2017	The Nut Job 2: Nutty by Nature	Director; Writer (with Bob Barlen and Scott Bindley); Voice of Charming Chipmunk
2019	The Puppet Master	Director; Writer (with Bob Barlen); Short film
2019	Arctic Dogs	Writer (with Bob Barlen, Matt Lyon, Aaron Woodley, and Bryan Thompson)
2020	Cranston Academy: Monster Zone	Writer (with Bob Barlen)
2020	Bigfoot Family	Writer (with Bob Barlen); Executive producers
2021	Paw Patrol: The Movie	Director; Writer (with Bob Barlen and Billy Frolick)
2023	Paw Patrol: The Mighty Movie	Director; Writer (with Bob Barlen)
2026	Paw Patrol: The Dino Movie	Director; Writer (with Bob Barlen)
TBA	Doctor Dolittle: King of the Wild	Writer (with Bob Barlen); Upcoming film

=== Television ===
Year	Title	Role
2005	Cyberchase	Designer
2009	Ninjamaica	Director; Storyboard artist Television film Directional debut
2009–2010	Spliced	Storyboard artist

== See also ==
- Bob Barlen
