= Cranston Academy: Monster Zone =

Cranston Academy, Monster Zone
- Mexican theatrical release poster
- Directed by: Leopoldo Aguilar
- Screenplay by: Bob Barlen; Cal Brunker
- Story by: José C. Garcia de Letona; Rita Street
- Produced by: José C. García de Letona; Fernando De Fuentes; Gregory Gavanski
- Starring: Jamie Bell; Ruby Rose; Jayssolitt
- Cinematography: Francisco Herrera Carrillo
- Edited by: Vincent Tabaillon; Gilad Carmel
- Music by: Jody Jenkins
- Production companies: Ánima; DNEG; Prime Focus World; Fifth Dimension Films
- Distributed by: Videocine (Mexico); Grindstone Entertainment (United States)
- Release dates: 12 March 2020 (Portugal); 26 June 2020 (Mexico); 30 October 2020 (United States)
- Running time: 80 minutes
- Countries: Mexico; United States; United Kingdom; Canada
- Languages: English; Spanish
- Box office: $1.55 million

Cranston Academy: Monster Zone (formerly Scary Show) is an animated horror-comedy film directed by Leopoldo Aguilar. Produced by Ánima and Prime Focus World, the film is directed by Leopoldo Aguilar and features the voices of Jamie Bell and Ruby Rose.

The film was first released in Portugal on March 12, 2020, and later in Mexico on June 26, 2020, featuring the Spanish voices of Polo Morín, Natalia Téllez, and Edson Zuñiga. The film was later released in the U.S. by Grindstone Entertainment under the title Monster Zone.

== Premise ==
A maverick 15-year-old high school student, Danny, is transferred to a secret boarding school, where he opens a portal of monsters from the fifth dimension. To save the school from the havoc of the monsters, he must work with his more successful rival, Liz, and their moth-human hybrid professor.

== Voice cast ==
=== Spanish ===
- Polo Morín as Danny
- Natalia Téllez as Liz
- Edson Zuñiga as Hombre Polilla (Mothman)

=== English ===
- Jamie Bell as Danny
- Ruby Rose as Liz
- Idzi Dutkiewicz as Mothman

== Development ==
Bob Barlen and Cal Brunker have been attached to write the film's screenplay. The pair have previously written and directed films such as Escape from Planet Earth and The Nut Job 2: Nutty by Nature. The film's animation is handled by DNEG and Prime Focus World.

=== Casting ===
On November 1, 2019, British actor Jamie Bell, and Australian actress Ruby Rose joined the film's lead voice cast. Jason Moring, the CEO of Double Dutch International, has stated that "[we're] big fans of Jamie and Ruby. They're incredible actors with a truly wide inclusive fan base." For the Spanish-dubbed version, telenovela actor Polo Morín, television host Natalia Téllez, and comedian Edson Zuñiga have lent their voices to the lead roles.

== Release ==
The film was initially planned for release on November 1, 2019 in Mexico, but has been postponed. It was first released in theaters in Portugal on March 12, 2020. It was eventually released in Mexico on June 26, 2020, distributed by Videocine and titled Escuela de miedo ("School of Fear" in Spanish).

=== Box office ===
In Mexico, the film has grossed MX$2.4 million pesos ($0.13 million USD) in 8 weeks of its theatrical run.

== Awards and nominations ==
Year	Award	Category	Nominees	Result
2021	63rd Ariel Awards	Mejor largometraje de animacion (Best Animation Feature)	Leopoldo Aguilar	Nominated
2021	Quirino Awards	Best Ibero-American Animation Feature Film	Leopoldo Aguilar	Nominated
