= Bob Barlen =

Canadian screenwriter and producer

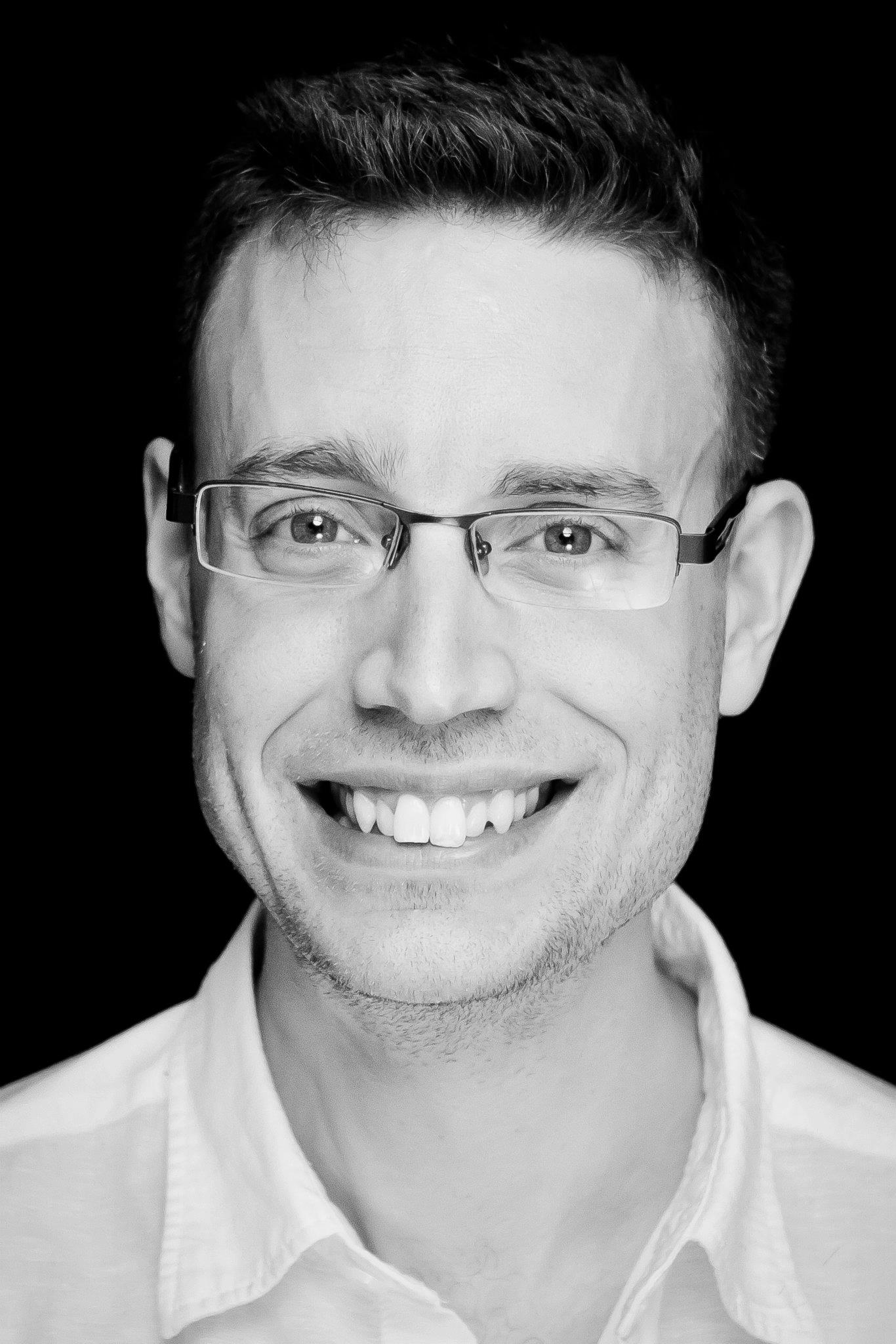
- Bob Barlen during production of Escape from Planet Earth
- Education: Ryerson University; Canadian Film Centre
- Occupations: Screenwriter; producer
- Years active: 2013–present
- Notable work: Paw Patrol: The Movie; Paw Patrol: The Mighty Movie; Paw Patrol: The Dino Movie

Bob Barlen is a Canadian screenwriter and producer. He is best known for turning the hit TV series Paw Patrol into a hit theatrical feature film franchise for Paramount Pictures, Nickelodeon, and Spin Master. Paw Patrol: The Movie (2021), Paw Patrol: The Mighty Movie (2023), and Paw Patrol: The Dino Movie (2026) were all made in collaboration with his creative partner Cal Brunker, who served as the director for these films.

== Career ==
Upon graduating from Ryerson University, Barlen attended the Directors' Lab at the Canadian Film Centre.

He co-wrote the screenplay for Escape from Planet Earth, which was released to theaters February 15, 2013.

Barlen produced and co-wrote the sequel The Nut Job 2: Nutty by Nature, starring Will Arnett, Maya Rudolph and Katherine Heigl, which was theatrically released by Open Road Films on August 11, 2017.

He co-wrote the screenplay for The Son of Bigfoot, a Belgian CGI-animated film, for nWave Pictures that was released in August 2017, and for Arctic Dogs, a Canadian CGI-animated feature film, for AMBI Pictures that was released in November 2019. His next screenplay work is Cranston Academy: Monster Zone, a Mexican-British-Canadian animated horror-comedy film starring Jamie Bell and Ruby Rose, which is produced by Ánima Estudios and Prime Focus World.

On 21 February 2020, following the announcement, Barlen confirmed via his Twitter that he's collaborating with Brunker once more as a co-writer, along with Billy Frolick, for Paw Patrol: The Movie, a film based on the popular Nick Jr. Channel animated series, Paw Patrol. It was released on August 20, 2021, produced by Nickelodeon Movies and Spin Master, and distributed by Paramount Pictures.

By May 2026, Barlen wrote the screenplay for Doctor Dolittle: King of the Wild, an animated reimagining of the Dr. Dolittle franchise, for Sycamore Studios.

== Filmography ==
Year	Title	Director	Writer	Producer	Miscellaneous	Notes
2002	Deportation at Breakfast	Yes	Yes	Yes	No	Short film
2003	Enrico, Stammi Vicino	No	No	No	Yes	Short film Cinematographer
2007	Push and Turn	Yes	Yes	Yes	No	Short film Co-written with David Knobel
2009	Ollie & the Baked Halibut	No	No	No	Yes	Short film Titles; First collaboration with animator Cal Brunker
2009	Ninjamaica	No	No	Line	No	Television film
2013	Escape from Planet Earth	No	Yes	No	No	Co-written with Cal Brunker; Feature film debut
2017	The Son of Bigfoot	No	Yes	Executive	No	Co-written with Cal Brunker
2017	The Nut Job 2: Nutty by Nature	No	Yes	Yes	Yes	Co-written with Cal Brunker and Scott Bindley; Voice of Handsome Mouse
2019	Arctic Dogs	No	Yes	No	No	Co-written with Matt Lyon, Cal Brunker, Aaron Woodley, and Bryan Thompson
2019	The Puppet Master	No	Yes	Yes	No	Short film Co-written with Cal Brunker
2020	Cranston Academy: Monster Zone	No	Yes	No	No	Co-written with Cal Brunker
2020	Bigfoot Family	No	Yes	Executive	No	Co-written with Cal Brunker; sequel to The Son of Bigfoot
2021	Paw Patrol: The Movie	No	Yes	Associate	No	Co-written with Cal Brunker and Billy Frolick
2023	Paw Patrol: The Mighty Movie	No	Yes	Associate	No	Co-written with Cal Brunker; sequel to Paw Patrol: The Movie
2026	Paw Patrol: The Dino Movie	No	Yes	Associate	No	Co-written with Cal Brunker; sequel to Paw Patrol: The Mighty Movie; upcoming film
TBA	Doctor Dolittle: King of the Wild	No	Yes	No	No	Co-written with Cal Brunker; upcoming film
