= Paw Patrol: The Mighty Movie =

2023 animated film by Cal Brunker

- Theatrical release poster
- Directed by: Cal Brunker
- Screenplay by: Cal Brunker; Bob Barlen
- Story by: Cal Brunker; Bob Barlen; Shane Morris
- Based on: Paw Patrol by Keith Chapman
- Produced by: Jennifer Dodge; Laura Clunie; Toni Stevens
- Starring: Mckenna Grace; Taraji P. Henson; Marsai Martin; Christian Convery; Kim Kardashian; North West; Saint West; James Marsden; Kristen Bell; Finn Lee-Epp
- Edited by: Ed Fuller
- Music by: Pinar Toprak
- Production company: Spin Master Entertainment
- Distributed by: Elevation Pictures (Canada); Paramount Pictures (Worldwide) (Note: through Nickelodeon Movies)
- Release date: September 29, 2023
- Running time: 88 minutes (Note: The theatrical release runtime is 92 minutes due to being accompanied by a short film, Dora and the Fantastical Creatures.)
- Country: Canada
- Language: English
- Budget: $30 million
- Box office: $205 million

Paw Patrol: The Mighty Movie is a 2023 Canadian animated superhero film based on the television series Paw Patrol by Keith Chapman. The sequel to Paw Patrol: The Movie (2021), it was directed by Cal Brunker, who co-wrote the screenplay with Bob Barlen. The film features an ensemble voice cast, including Mckenna Grace, Taraji P. Henson, Marsai Martin, Christian Convery, Kim Kardashian, North West, Saint West, James Marsden, Kristen Bell, and Finn Lee-Epp. Several cast members from both the television series and the previous film also reprised their roles, such as Ron Pardo, Callum Shoniker, Luxton Handspiker (reprising his role from the spin-off series Rubble & Crew), Christian Corrao, and with others joining the cast. In the film, the Paw Patrol pups gain superpowers from crystals inside a meteor and must stop Mayor Humdinger and his new accomplice Victoria Vance, a meteor-obsessed scientist, from wreaking havoc in Adventure City.

In August 2021, following the success of the first film, director Brunker expressed interest in returning for a sequel. It was greenlit by Spin Master Entertainment in November 2021, with a planned October 13, 2023 release date, before being pushed forward to a September 2023 release. The film is based on the Mighty Pups sub-theme of the main show. Mikros Image in Montreal returned to provide computer-animation, while the musical score was composed by Pinar Toprak. Most of the main voice cast was announced in January 2023, following Henson's casting in May 2022.

Paw Patrol: The Mighty Movie was released on September 29, 2023, in Canada by Elevation Pictures, and worldwide by Paramount Pictures. Like the first film, it received positive reviews from critics and was a financial success, grossing $205 million against a production budget of $30 million. The film became the highest grossing film in the Paw Patrol franchise, A further sequel, Paw Patrol: The Dino Movie, was released on August 14, 2026.

== Plot ==
Following the destruction of the Cloud Catcher and Mayor Humdinger's arrest, (Note: As depicted in Paw Patrol: The Movie (2021)) meteoriticist Victoria Vance steals a giant electromagnet from Hank and Janet's scrapyard, inadvertently setting a fire that traps the owners. Janet sends Ryder and the Paw Patrol pups to extinguish the fire.

At Adventure City, the citizens gather for a meteor shower, while Ryder introduces the Paw Patrol to Nano, Mini, and Tot, three Pomeranians who wish to be part of the team as Junior Patrollers. Meanwhile, Vance travels to an abandoned observatory and creates a Meteor Magnet from what she stole, hoping to attract an incoming magical meteor. The machine malfunctions, causing the meteor to head for Paw Tower. Ryder and the pups evacuate the tower, and help the civilians escape before the meteor destroys the tower and wrecks the street below it. The Paw Patrol takes the rock to their Aircraft Carrier headquarters for analysis.

That night, Skye awakens as the meteor rock begins to glow. It splits to reveal seven crystals, one of which grants her the powers of flight and super strength. The other pups each take a crystal to gain powers themselves, but as Liberty seems to have no abilities, Ryder assigns her to train the Junior Patrollers.

Vance, having been arrested for public endangerment, escapes prison with Humdinger and the Kitten Catastrophe Crew. Inside Humdinger's private airplane, the group plans to trap the Paw Patrol, who have now re-branded as "the Mighty Pups". Vance deliberately destroys one of the plane's engines and calls Ryder, who sends Skye to investigate. Vance steals Skye's crystal and parachutes out of the plane alongside Humdinger and the kittens, leaving Skye trapped inside. Ryder and the other pups clear Main Street so Skye can land the damaged plane.

Back at the Aircraft Carrier, Skye tells Chase that having superpowers was the first time in her life she did not feel like the smallest and weakest. Having been the runt of her litter at birth, she was always overlooked and never got adopted. Hoping to find herself a home, she tried to follow Ryder through a blizzard, but collapsed from hypothermia. Thankfully, Ryder turned around and saved her from freezing by wrapping her in his coat. Taking the other pups' crystals, Skye attempts to retrieve hers from the villains, but Vance, having acquired superpowers of her own, captures Skye and steals the rest of the crystals. When Skye tries to warn Vance of the consequences of using the Meteor Magnet to attract more meteors, Vance reveals to Skye that she was bullied by her former colleagues in her group, who called her a mad scientist for her meteor obsession. After learning of what has happened, the rest of the Paw Patrol and Junior Patrollers fight and subdue Humdinger, who has used one of the crystals from Vance to grow into a giant. Marshall retrieves the crystal, and Humdinger is rearrested.

The Paw Patrol follows the crystal's signature to the observatory, where the Junior Patrollers distract Vance so Zuma can rescue Skye. The pups each take turns using Humdinger's crystal as they fight Vance. During the battle, Chase falls off a cliff, but Liberty rescues him, discovering her superpower is elasticity in the process. The pups retrieve the other crystals, subdue and rearrest Vance, and destroy the meteor Magnet; however, Vance has already attracted more meteors, which are now heading for Adventure City. The pups give their crystals to Skye, who flies into the air and destroys each meteor individually. A giant meteor enters the Earth's atmosphere, and Skye destroys it as well; she is subsequently rendered unconscious, but the crystals resuscitate her. She and the Paw Patrol celebrate together, as they head out on the Aircraft Carrier.

== Voice cast ==
- Mckenna Grace as Skye, a Cockapoo who serves as the team's aviator pup with her power of flight and super strength. Grace replaces Lilly Bartlam from both the first film and the series.
- Taraji P. Henson as Victoria "Vee" Vance, a meteoriticist who collaborates with Mayor Humdinger.
- Marsai Martin as Liberty, a long-haired Dachshund who serves as a city rescue pup with the power of elasticity and a former crowd dog. Martin reprises her role from the first film.
- Christian Convery as Chase, a German Shepherd who serves as a police pup with the power of super speed. Convery replaces Luke Dietz from the series and Iain Armitage from the first film.
- Ron Pardo as:
  - Mayor Humdinger, the Paw Patrol's arch-nemesis who comes from Foggy Bottom.
  - Cap'n Turbot, an animal expert, and one of the Paw Patrol's frequent callers.
    - Pardo reprises both roles from both the series and the first film.
- Lil Rel Howery as Sam Stringer, a news reporter.
  - Trevor McDonald voices Sam in the UK dub of the film.
- Kim Kardashian as Delores, a Poodle who works in an animal shelter. Kardashian reprises her role from the first film.
- Chris Rock as the Kitten Catastrophe Crew's version of Rubble.
- Serena Williams as Yoga Yvette, a yoga instructor.
- Alan Kim as Nano, a Pomeranian.
- Brice Gonzalez as Tot, a Pomeranian.
- North West as Mini, a Pomeranian.
- Saint West as Meteor Man.
- James Marsden as Hank, co-owner of the Scrapyard.
- Kristen Bell as Janet, co-owner of the Scrapyard.
- Finn Lee-Epp as Ryder, a boy who leads the Paw Patrol. Lee-Epp replaces Kai Harris from the series and Will Brisbin from the first film.
- Christian Corrao as Marshall, a Dalmatian who serves as a firefighter pup with the power of fireballs. Corrao reprises his role from the series and replaces Kingsley Marshall from both the first film and the series.
- Luxton Handspiker as Rubble, a wisecracking English Bulldog who serves as a construction pup with the power of a wrecking ball. Handspiker reprises his role from Rubble & Crew and replaces Keegan Hedley from both the first film and the series and Lucien Duncan-Reid from the series.
- Nylan Parthipan as Zuma, a chocolate Labrador who serves as an aquatic rescue pup with the power to turn his body into water. Parthipan previously voiced Al from the Big Truck Pups sub-series and replaces Shayle Simons from both the first film and the series and Jordan Mazeral from the series.
- Callum Shoniker as Rocky, a mixed-breed dog who serves as a recycling pup with the power of magnetism. Shoniker reprises his role from the first film.
- Kim Roberts as Mayor Goodway, the Mayor of Adventure Bay. Roberts reprises her role from both the series and first film.
- Dan Duran as a radio announcer.
- Sugith Varughese as a prison guard.
- Monique Alvarez as Carmen, a entrepreneur and the owner of a local bodega/grocery store. Alvarez reprises her role from the first film.
- Neil Crone as Tony, a grocery store proprietor. Crone reprises his role from the first film.
  - Roman Kemp voices Tony in the UK dub of the film.

== Production ==
=== Development ===
In an August 2021 interview, director Cal Brunker stated that he was interested in making a sequel after the success of Paw Patrol: The Movie. He said, "We've certainly thought about it. There are other stories that we would be excited about telling. But for us, it's really about seeing if people love this one, and then taking it from there." On November 3, 2021, Spin Master announced that a sequel, titled Paw Patrol: The Mighty Movie, had begun development, with Brunker confirmed to be returning in the sequel as director and Jennifer Dodge set to return as producer with the addition of Laura Clunie and Toni Stevens.

The sequel features elements from the Mighty Pups sub-theme of the series, where a magical meteor crash lands in Adventure Bay and the pups transform into Mighty Pups with superpowers. It focuses on the story of Skye who is the smallest member of the team, exploring her new "powers" in Adventure City and featuring supervillains where they steal the superpowers from the Mighty Pups, determined to make the biggest difference.

Jennifer Dodge, who produced the film sequel, said that she wanted to tell a deeper story that could resonate even stronger with kids and families worldwide. She added, "Judging by the exit polls, audience scores, and positive critical reception, everyone had as much fun watching it, and rewatching it, as we did making it. We’re looking forward to taking kids on a new adventure in the second film with our partners and can't wait to further expand our storytelling with one of the fan-favorite pups in our spin-off."

=== Casting ===
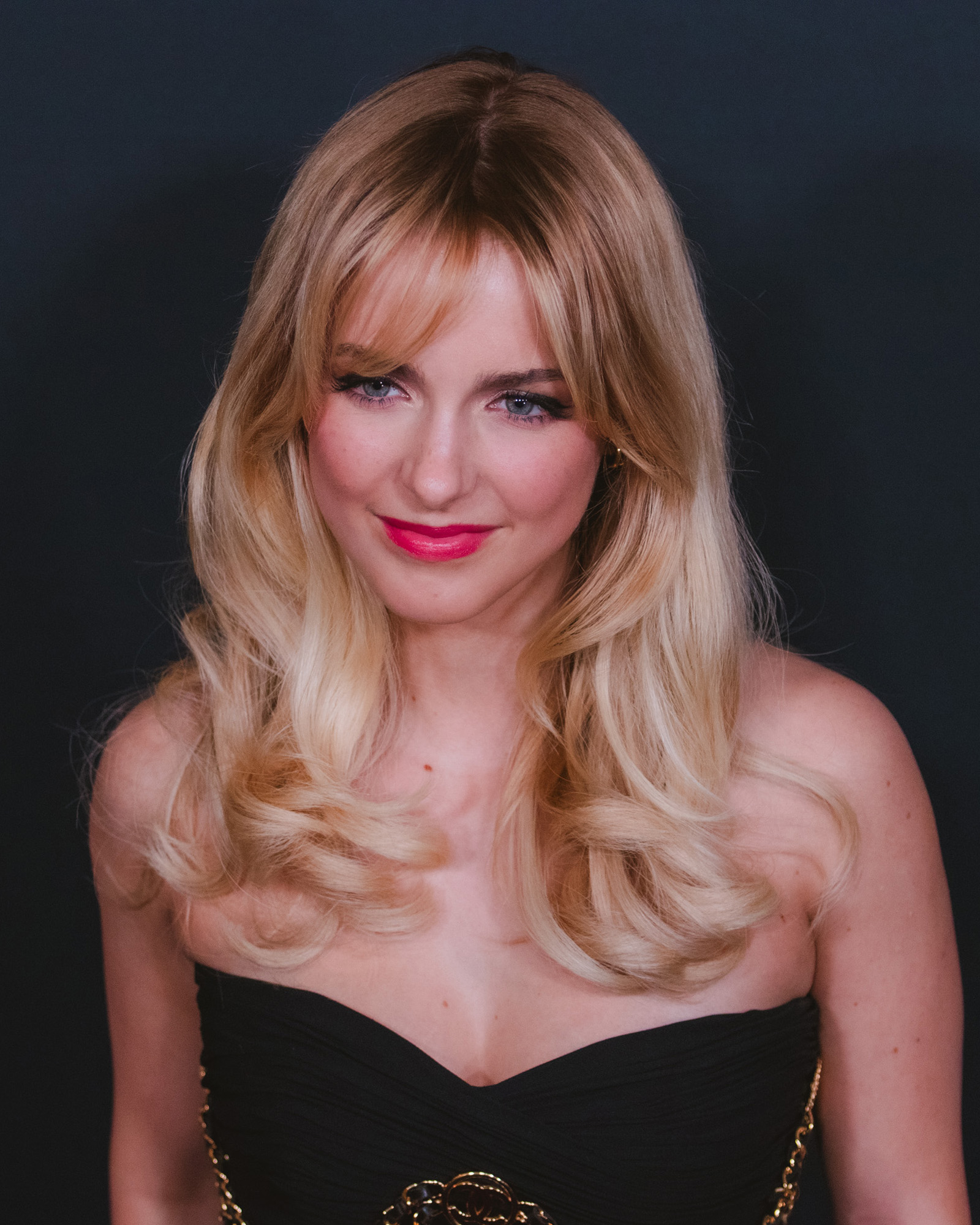
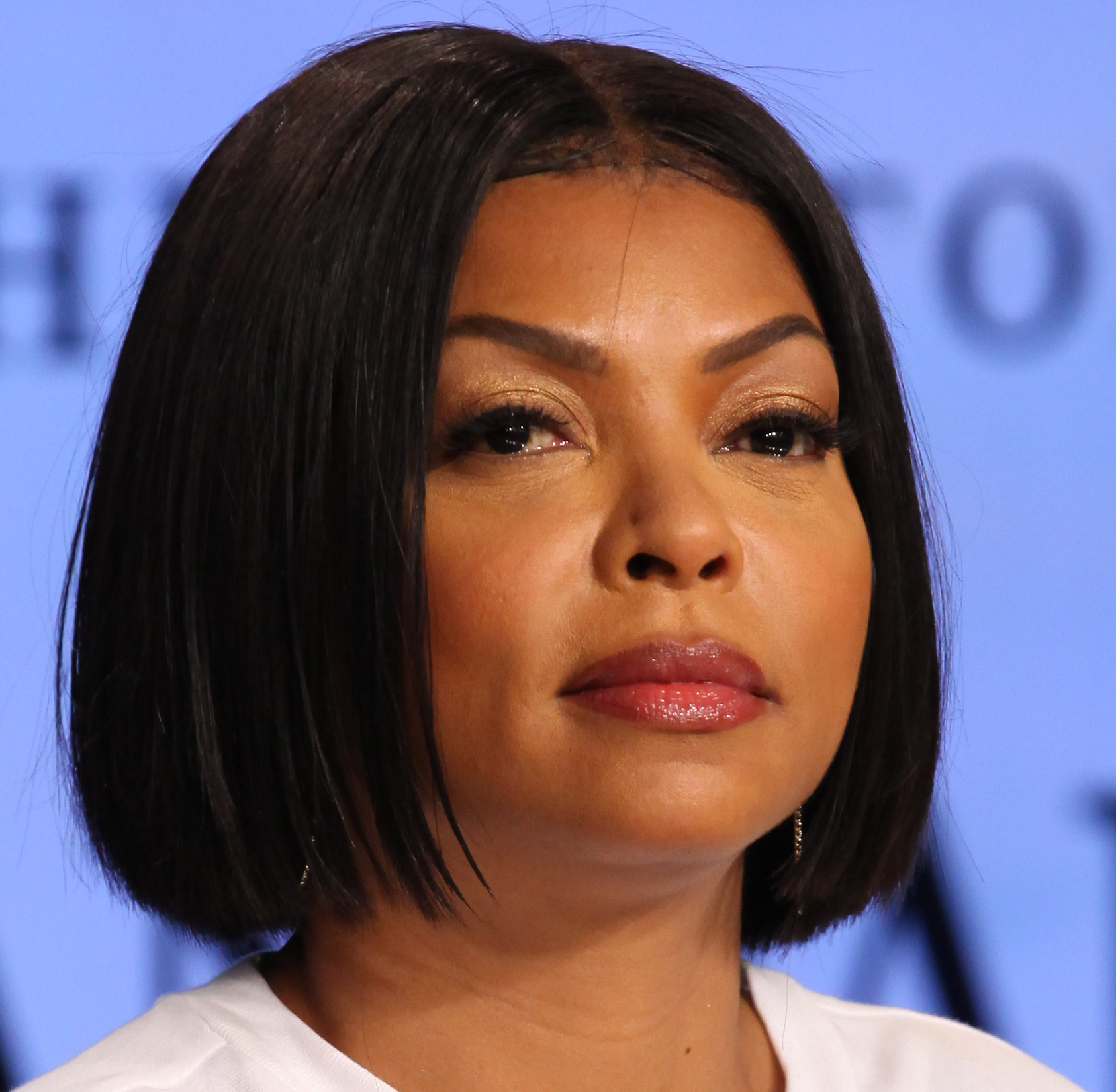
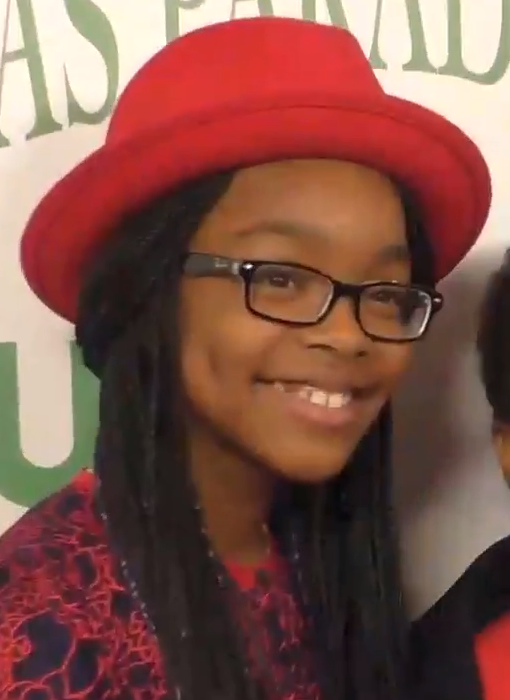
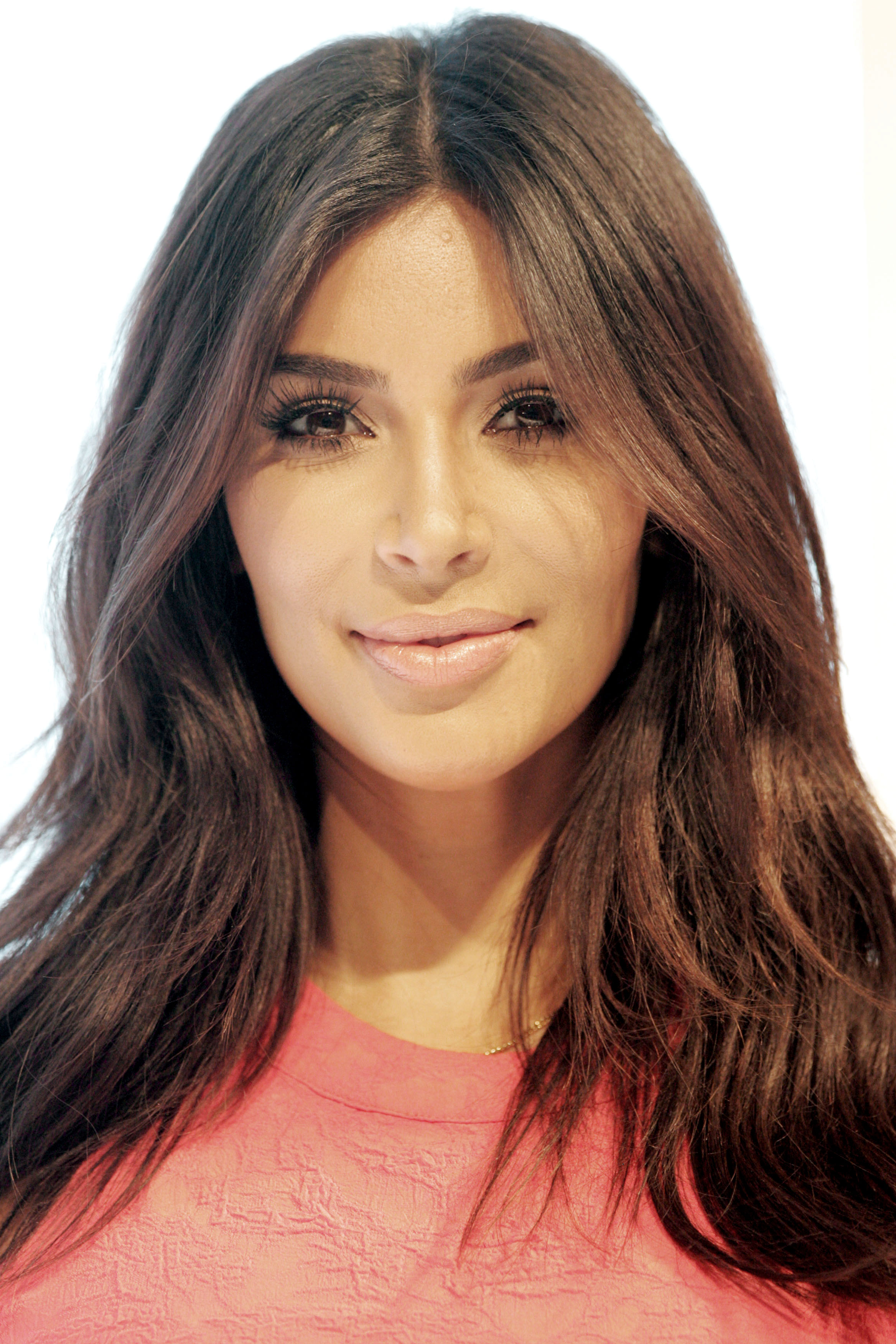
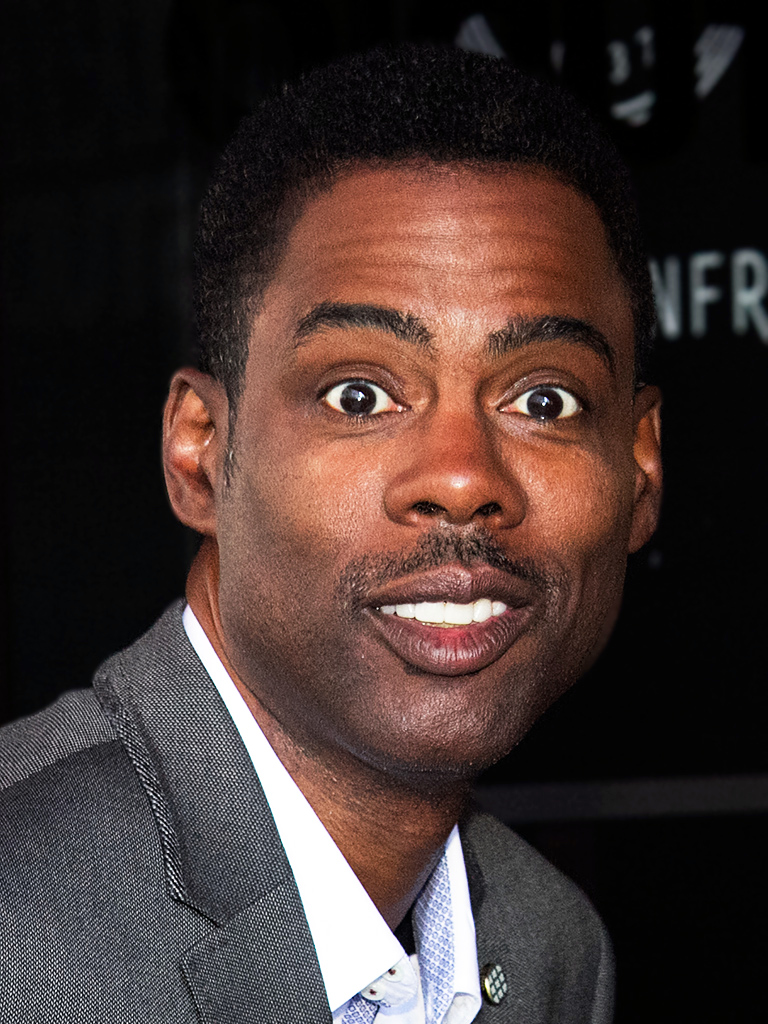
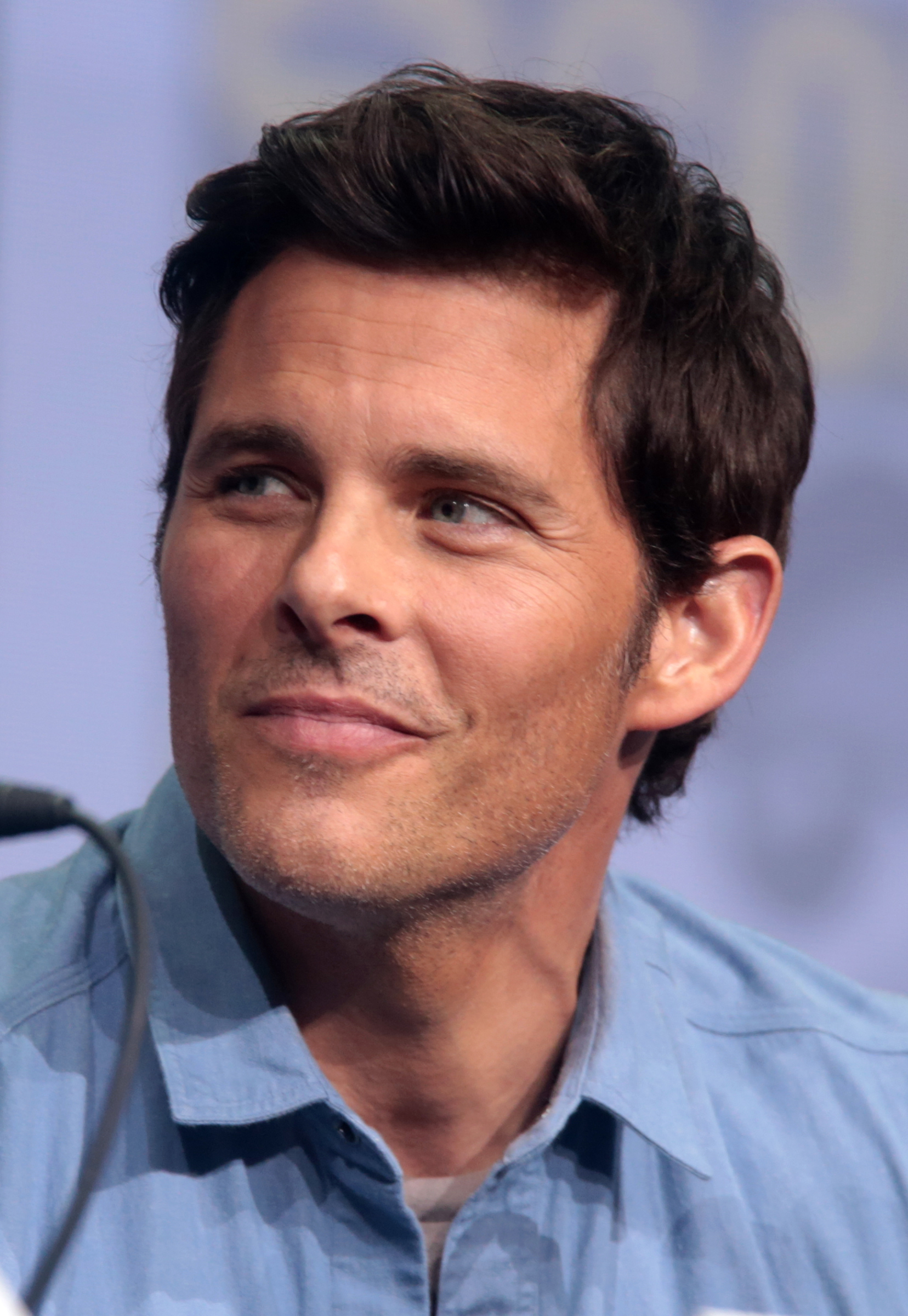
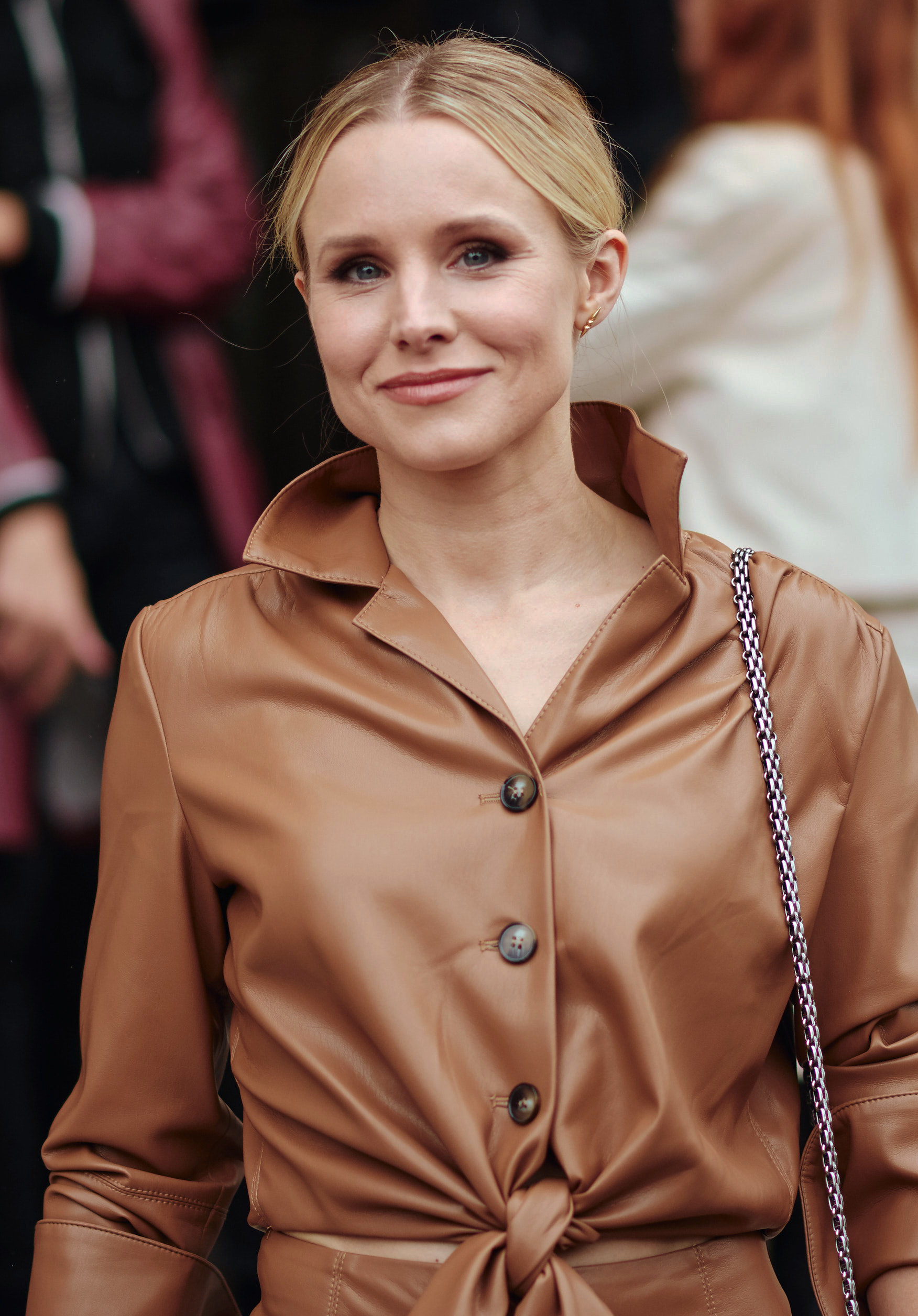
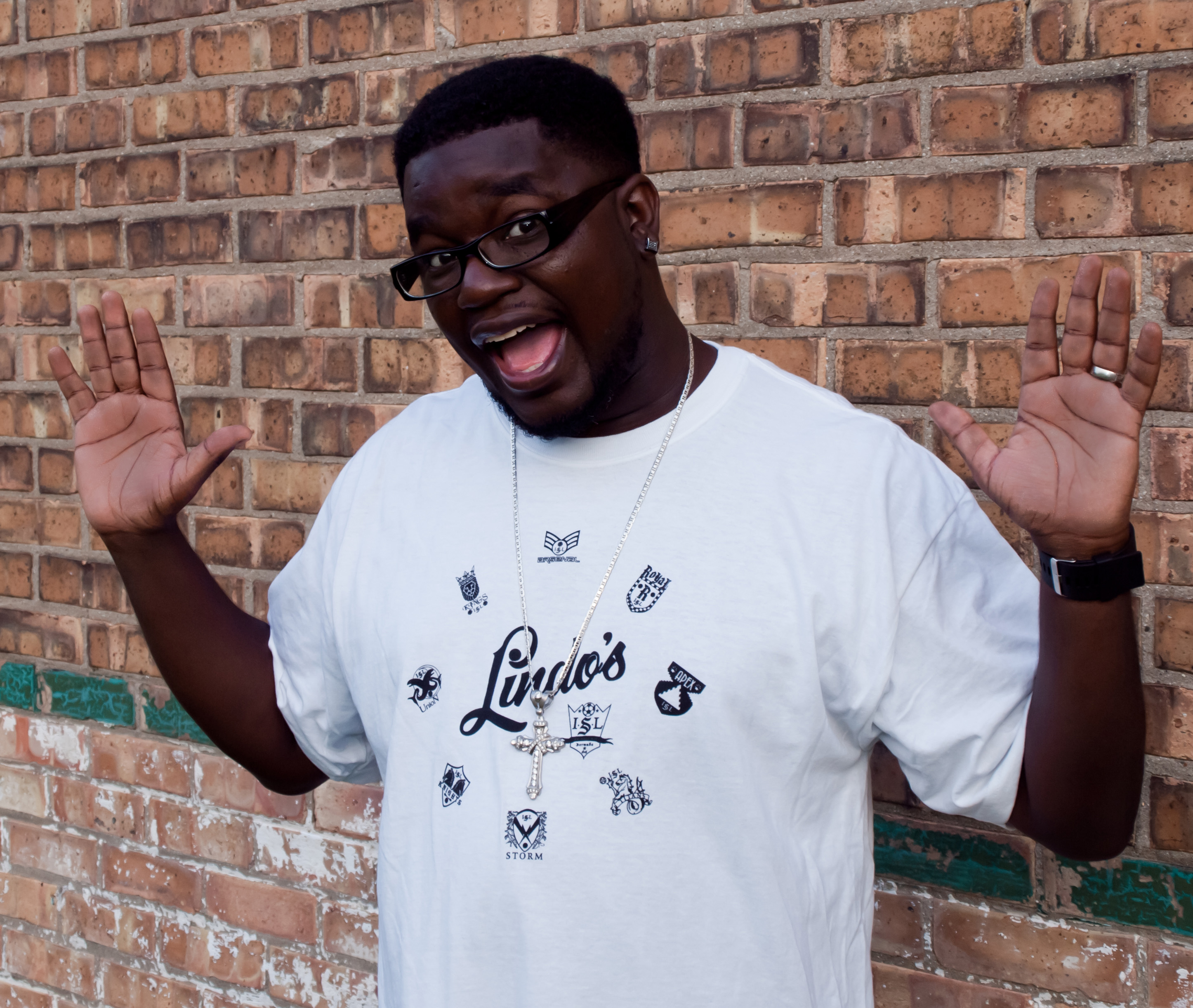
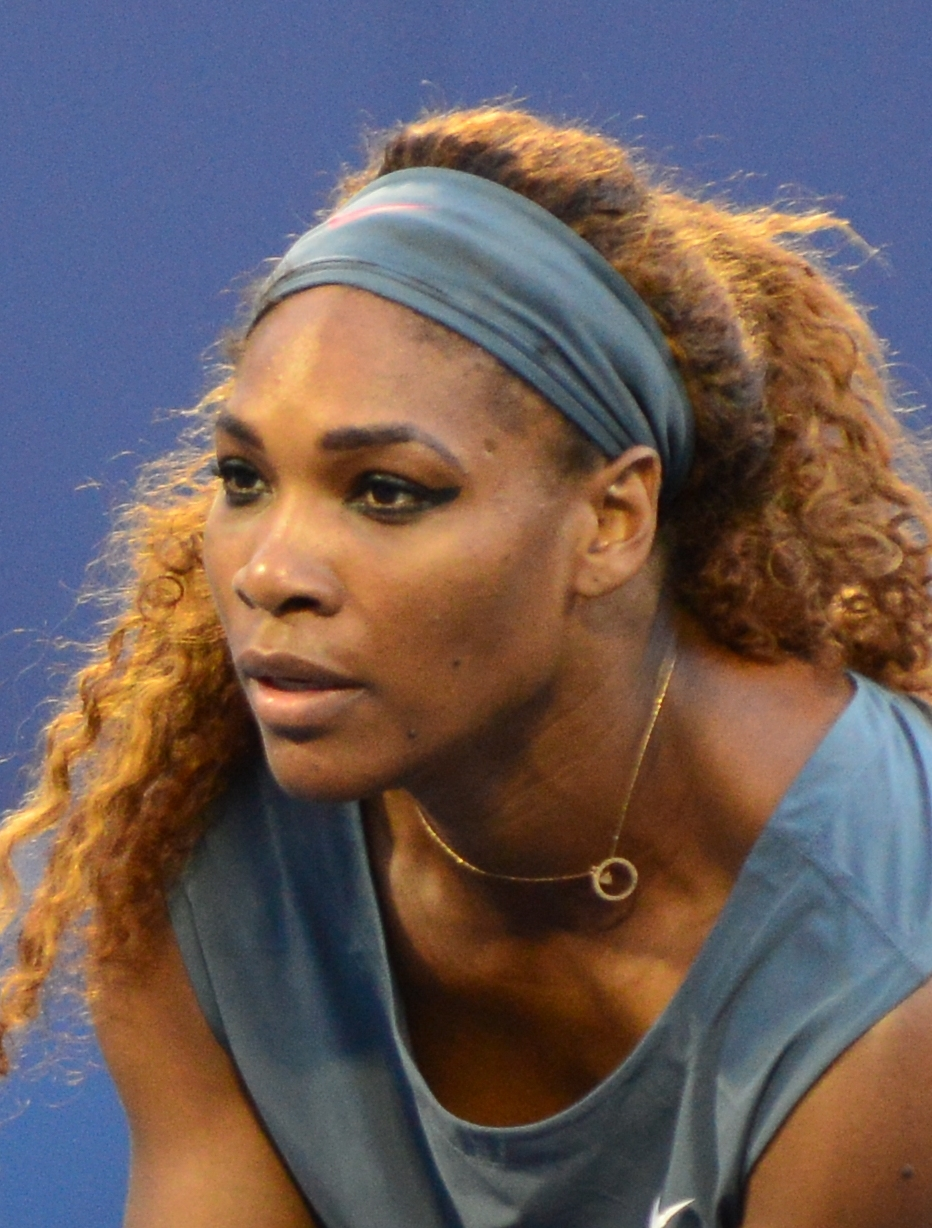
The voice cast of Paw Patrol: The Mighty Movie (L-R): Mckenna Grace, Taraji P. Henson, Marsai Martin, Kim Kardashian, Chris Rock, James Marsden, Kristen Bell, Lil Rel Howery, and Serena Williams.

In May 2022, it was announced that Taraji P. Henson would join the cast in a new role. After joining the sequel, she made the following statement: "I am so excited to be a part of the next Paw Patrol theatrical adventure. While I don't want to give too much away, my character in the film throws the pups some new challenges that they must unite to overcome. I think the film has a powerful message for kids that no matter how small they might be, they can still make a difference in their community."

On January 25, 2023, Kristen Bell, Christian Convery (replacing Luke Dietz from the series and Iain Armitage from the first film as Chase), Mckenna Grace (replacing Lily Bartlam from the first film and the series as Skye), Lil Rel Howery, James Marsden, Serena Williams, Kim Kardashian (reprising her role as Delores from the first film), Marsai Martin (reprising her role as Liberty from the first film), Ron Pardo (reprising his roles as both Cap'n Turbot and Mayor Humdinger from both the series and the first film), Callum Shoniker (reprising his role as Rocky from the first film), Alan Kim, Brice Gonzalez, North West, Saint West, Luxton Handspiker (reprising his role as Rubble from the spin-off series Rubble & Crew, replacing Keegan Hedley from both the first film and the series and Lucien Duncan-Reid from the series), Christian Corrao (reprising his role as Marshall from the series, replacing Kingsley Marshall from the first film), and Nylan Parthipan (replacing Shayle Simons from the first film and Jordan Mazeral from the series as Zuma) were added to the cast. Grace and Martin had previously worked together in Spirit Untamed. During Paramount's presentation at CinemaCon in April, Ramsey Naito, president of Paramount Animation and Nickelodeon Animation, previewed a trailer for Paw Patrol: The Mighty Movie and revealed that Chris Rock will have a cameo in the film.

=== Animation ===
On June 7, 2022, it was announced that Mikros Animation in Montreal, who animated the first film, would return to handle the animation.

== Music ==
Pinar Toprak composed the film's musical score, replacing Heitor Pereira from the first film. The soundtrack album was released on September 29, 2023, the same day as the film's theatrical release. Additionally, three original songs were announced to be made for the film: "Down Like That", "Bark to the Beat", and "Learning To Fly", performed by Bryson Tiller, Mckenna Grace with blackbear, and Christina Aguilera and released as singles on September 8, 15, and 22, respectively.

== Release ==
=== Theatrical ===
Paw Patrol: The Mighty Movie was theatrically released earlier in various European countries, including Portugal, on September 23, 2023. It was released in the United States and Canada on September 29. Unlike the first film, which was simultaneously released on Paramount+ in addition to a traditional theatrical release due to the COVID-19 pandemic, the film was released exclusively in theaters. It was accompanied by the short animated film Dora and the Fantastical Creatures from the upcoming preschool show Dora. Upon the film's announcement, it was given a release date of October 13, 2023, in November 2021, but in February 2023, it was pushed forward by two weeks to its current date. However other territories released the film in October 2023; the United Kingdom, for example, showed a special charity preview in aid of Medicinema on September 24, 2023, and had two weekends of advance preview screenings from September 30, 2023, before its wide release on October 13.

=== Marketing ===
The film's trailer was released on June 12, 2023. A line of action figures and toys by Spin Master was released in August 2023.

=== Home media ===
Paramount Home Entertainment released Paw Patrol: The Mighty Movie on digital on October 31, 2023. The movie was streamed on November 14, 2023, on Paramount+ and released on DVD and Blu-ray on December 12, 2023.

=== Television broadcasts ===
Paw Patrol: The Mighty Movie made its TV debut on Nickelodeon on July 19, 2024.

== Reception ==
=== Box office ===
Paw Patrol: The Mighty Movie grossed $65.2 million in the United States and Canada, and $139.8 million in other territories, for a worldwide total of $205 million. Deadline Hollywood calculated the net profit of the film to be $114 million, when factoring together all expenses and revenues, placing it tenth on their list of 2023's "Most Valuable Blockbusters".

In the United States and Canada, Paw Patrol: The Mighty Movie was released alongside The Creator, Saw X, and the wide expansion of Dumb Money, and was projected to gross $18–20 million from 3,989 theaters in its opening weekend. It made $6.8 million on its first day, and went on to debut to $22.8 million, topping the box office. It fell 48% to $11.2 million in its second weekend, finishing second behind newcomer The Exorcist: Believer, and then made $7 million in its third weekend.

=== Critical response ===
On the review aggregator website Rotten Tomatoes, 72% of 50 critics' reviews are positive, with an average rating of 6/10. The website's consensus reads: "Paw Patrol: The Mighty Movie will be best enjoyed by its youthful target audience, but it's sweet, thoughtful, and funny enough to entertain the entire family." Metacritic, which uses a weighted average, assigned the film a score of 49 out of 100, based on 11 critics, indicating "mixed or average" reviews. Audiences surveyed by CinemaScore gave the film an average grade of "A" on an A+ to F scale (an improvement over the first film's "A−"), while those polled at PostTrak gave it an 83% overall positive score, with 68% saying they would definitely recommend the film.

Courtney Howard of Variety gave the film a positive review, writing, "With much humor and charm, this second chapter reads fairly well for all ages. It may not reinvent the wheel, but it certainly knows how to cleverly repackage and resell the goods." Sandie Angulo Chen of Common Sense Media gave the film 4 out of 5 stars, writing: "Skye's subplot will particularly resonate with young audiences, since she initially feels like her small size makes her the team's weakest link." Nell Minow of RogerEbert.com gave the film three stars out of four, saying "Is it a worthwhile transition object to get children used to the thrill of seeing stories they love on a giant screen in a dark room? Of course, it is."

Jesse Hassenger of IGN gave the film a 5 out of 10, stating: "PAW Patrol: The Mighty Movie feels more like a legitimate feature film than its predecessor, but it's still well within the realm of distractor cinema rather than something parents would want to watch with their kids." Frank Scheck of The Hollywood Reporter gave the film a mixed review, writing, "Unfortunately, much of the film's running time is taken up [with]... the sort of typically mind-numbing action sequences stuffing adult live-action superhero franchises." Jake Wilson of The Age criticized the film for its rehashed plot.

=== Accolades ===
Award	Date of ceremony	Category	Nominee(s)	Result	Ref.
Hollywood Music in Media Awards	November 15, 2023	Best Original Song – Animated Film	"Down Like That" – Bryson Tiller, Chantry Johnson, Michelle Zarlenga, and Charlie Heath	Nominated	
Canadian Screen Awards	May 26–31, 2024	Best Sound Editing	J. R. Fountain	Nominated	
Canadian Screen Awards	May 26–31, 2024	Best Sound Mixing	Bernard Gariépy Strobl and J.R. Fountain	Nominated	
Canadian Screen Awards	May 26–31, 2024	Golden Screen Award	Spin Master Entertainment	Won	
Leo Awards	July 7, 2024	Best Voice Performance Animation Program	Christian Convery	Nominated	
Nickelodeon Kids' Choice Awards	July 13, 2024	Favorite Animated Movie	Paw Patrol: The Mighty Movie	Nominated	
Nickelodeon Kids' Choice Awards	July 13, 2024	Favourite Female Voice From an Animated Movie	Kristen Bell	Nominated	
Nickelodeon Kids' Choice Awards	July 13, 2024	Favourite Female Voice From an Animated Movie	Mckenna Grace	Nominated	

== Sequel ==
On September 26, 2023, Spin Master announced that a third film is in development. On February 28, 2024, it was announced that a third movie will be released in theaters on July 31, 2026. In September 2024, it was announced that Jennifer Hudson and Fortune Feimster had joined the cast, with Mckenna Grace returning as Skye. On February 27, 2025, the title was announced as Paw Patrol: The Dino Movie. In May 2025, it was announced that the movie had been moved forward to July 24, 2026.
