= Dora and the Fantastical Creatures =

- Title card
- Directed by: William Mata
- Screenplay by: Alejandro Bien-Willner
- Story by: Alejandro Bien-Willner; Sean Gill
- Based on: Dora the Explorer by Chris Gifford; Valerie Walsh Valdes; Eric Weiner
- Produced by: Ken Duncan
- Starring: Diana Zermeño; Asher Spence; Marc Weiner; Kate del Castillo; Anairis Quiñones; Danny Burstein
- Edited by: Michael M.
- Music by: Joel Someillan; George Noriega
- Production company: Nickelodeon Animation Studio (Note: Animation outsourced to Duncan Studio.)
- Distributed by: Paramount Pictures
- Release date: September 29, 2023 (with PAW Patrol: The Mighty Movie)
- Running time: 4 minutes
- Country: United States
- Language: English

Dora and the Fantastical Creatures is a 2023 American animated short film based on the animated television series Dora the Explorer created by Chris Gifford, Valerie Walsh Valdes, and Eric Weiner. Produced by Nickelodeon Animation Studio, the film was directed by William Mata from a screenplay by Alejandro Bien-Willner and a story by Bien-Willner and Sean Gill. It stars the voices of Diana Zermeño, Asher Spence, Marc Weiner, Kate del Castillo, Anairis Quiñones, and Danny Burstein. The film sees Dora and Boots embark on an adventure to the land of the alebrijes and save their Copal Tree Celebration.

The magical world the film takes place in is inspired by Mexican folk art and alebrijes. As alebrijes are made of wood, the production team aimed to reflect that in the animation and make it look handmade. The film served as an early promotion for the reboot series Dora and premiered in theaters on September 29, 2023, along with Paw Patrol: The Mighty Movie.

== Plot ==
Dora and Boots are on their way to their Copal Tree Celebration in a magical dreamland of alebrijes. On entrance, they slide down a rainbow and meet their friend Ale, an alebrije, who explains that a ball of energy called "Glowie" powers the Copal Tree and helps baby alebrijes grow. As the celebration begins, however, Swiper swipes Glowie, and Dora, Boots, and Ale set off after him. As they dash through a cave, they lose track of Swiper. Dora asks the sun to set, allowing the land to become dark and allowing them to easily spot Glowie and Swiper. To retrieve Glowie back, Dora, Boots, and Ale, along with the audience, say "Swiper, no swiping" to Swiper, who obliges and returns it. The three put Glowie back in place, and the celebration continues as baby alebrijes hatch off the Copal tree.

== Voice cast ==
- Diana Zermeño - Dora
- Asher Spence - Boots
- Marc Weiner - Swiper
- Kate del Castillo - Ale
- Anairis Quiñones - Arcoiris, Luna
- Danny Burstein - Sol

== Production ==
William Mata had accepted the opportunity to direct the short film because Dora was a female Latina lead, which he felt was rare. In addition, he felt she embodied the traits of curiosity and exploration that he admired. In selecting supporting characters to be in the short film, Mata chose Boots and Swiper as he felt they were the most essential to the series. Mata wanted Dora to interact with the audience as she did in previous series, as he felt it was a staple of the franchise. A central theme of the film, is protecting nature. Mata said, "You always have to be aware of your surroundings and be an individual that's going to take care of things. It's cyclical. We try to build in this idea of traditions and things that happen over and over — and the importance of protecting beauty and nature is definitely super important. Top of the list."

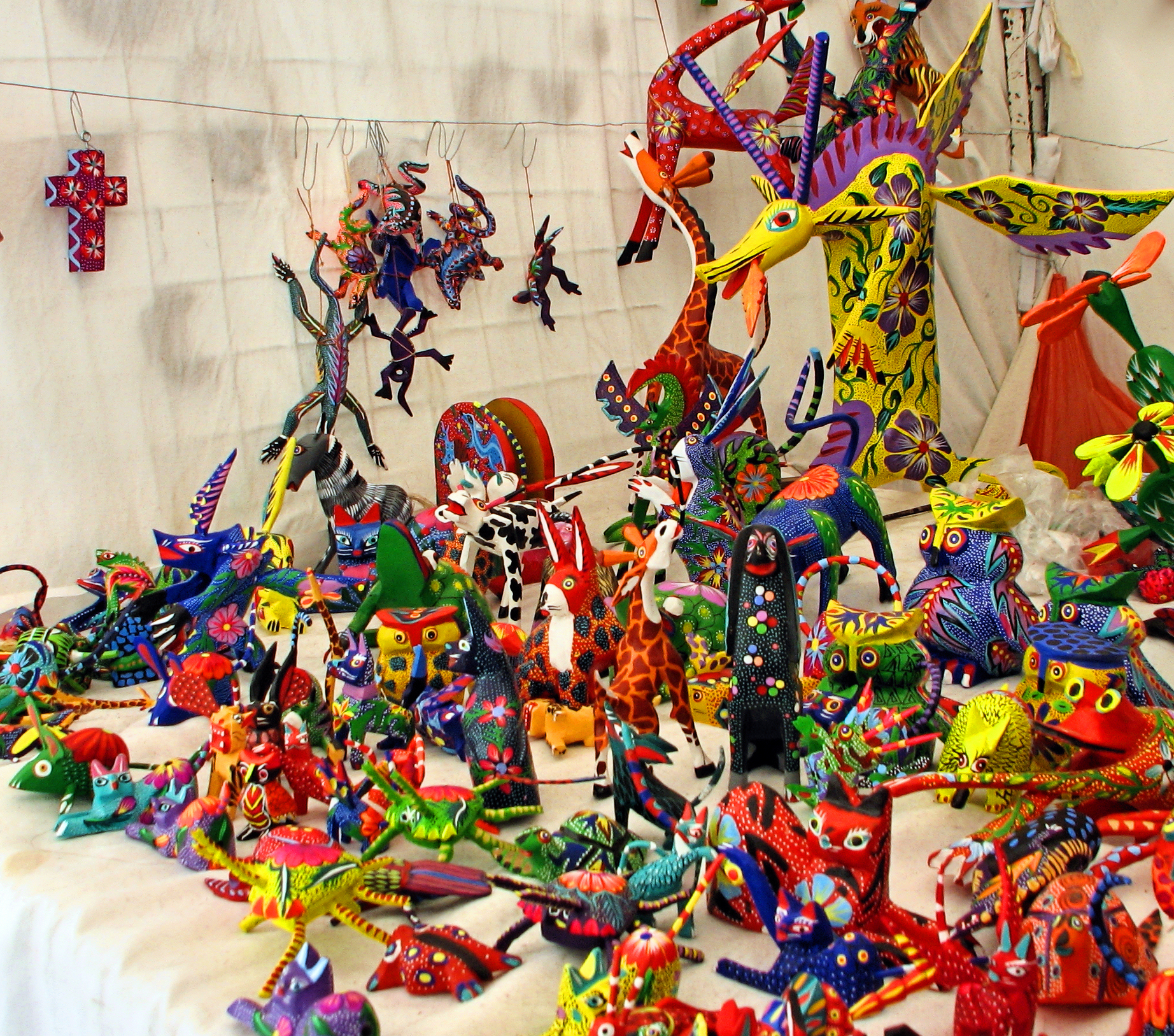
Alebrijes served as the main inspiration behind the short film.

Mata felt the use of computer animation, as opposed to traditional animation like previous series in the franchise, helped them create environments and shoot scenes in ways they could not before. He wanted a unique location for the film to take place in, and he landed on a magical world inspired by Mexican folk art and alebrijes. The central ceremony takes place at the Copal tree, a tree indigenous to Oaxaca and used to carve out alebrijes. As alebrijes are made of wood, the team decided to make their world-building rules based on that fact. This resulted in Dora and other characters moving more fluidly than the sculptures, which are animated on fours. Their goal was to make everything in the film look handmade, including landscapes. For Dora's design, the team aimed for her to be recognizable but also to introduce new elements as well.

== Release ==
The film was first announced on September 14, 2023, as an early promotion for the upcoming reboot series Dora. It was released alongside theatrical screenings of PAW Patrol: The Mighty Movie on September 29, 2023. Dora and the Fantastical Creatures was made available to Paramount+ on November 14, 2023, the same day as PAW Patrol: The Mighty Movie.

== Reception ==
Alejandra Martinez of The Austin Chronicle referred to the film as a "cute and colorful" appetizer to Paw Patrol: The Mighty Movie. Linda Cook of OurQuadCities.com similarly called the film a fun and colorful adventure. Contrastively, Jesse Lab of Flixist spoke negatively of the film and described it as a "fever dream." His criticism was levied towards the animation and character models.
