= Puggy =

Belgian pop band

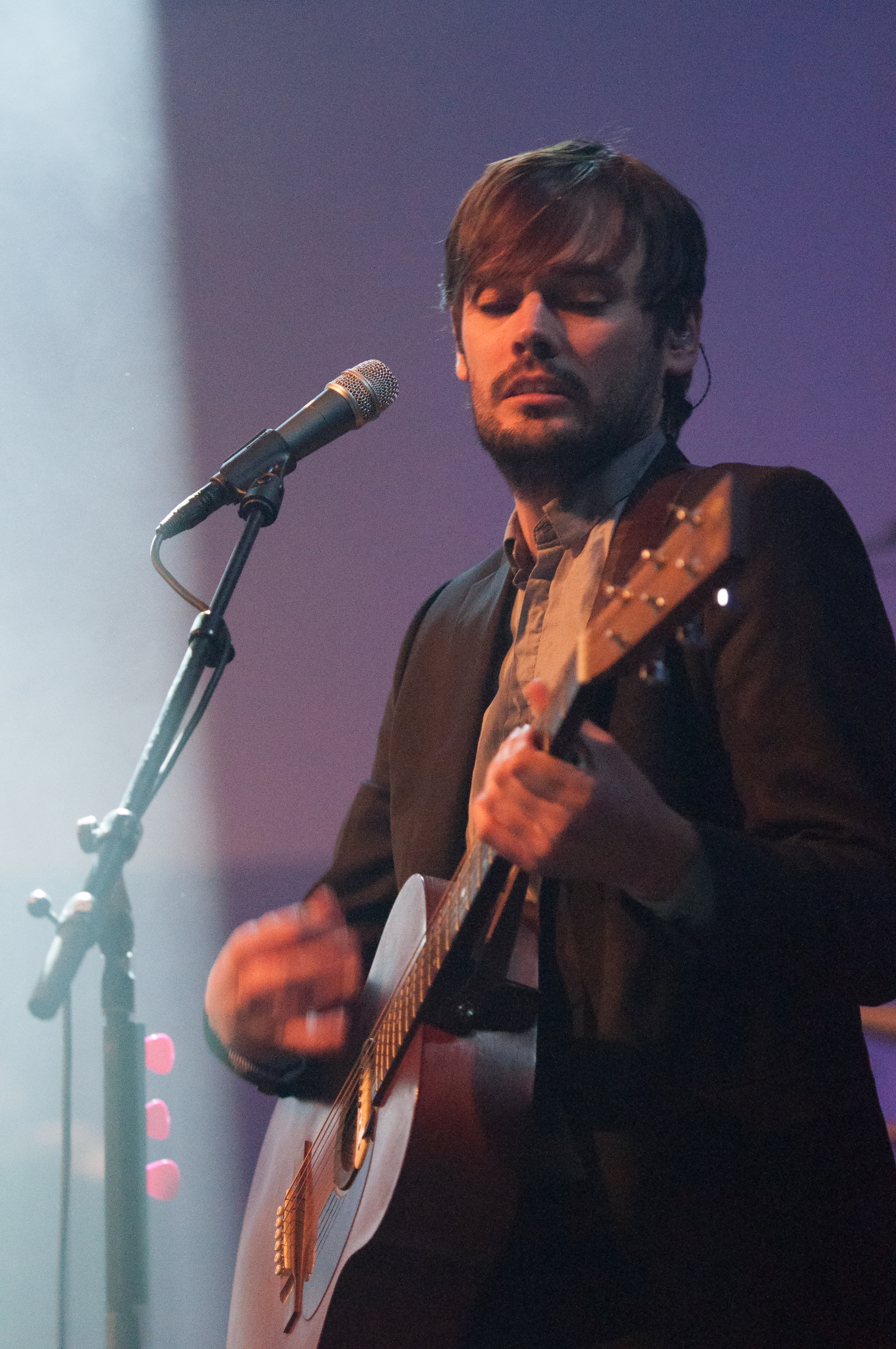
- Puggy at Paaspop 2014

Background information
- Origin: Belgium
- Genres: Pop
- Years active: 2004–present
- Labels: Talkieo; Mercury
- Members: Egil "Ziggy" Franzén; Matthew Irons; Romain Descampe
- Website: www.puggyband.com

Puggy is a Belgian band formed in 2004, when French bassist Romain Descampe and English vocalist Matthew Irons met Swedish drummer Egil "Ziggy" Franzén at a jazz school in Brussels. For this reason the band considers itself Belgian in origin. The band has released four albums and is signed to Mercury Records.

== Career ==
Puggy has toured all over the world, opening for prestigious bands such as Smashing Pumpkins, Incubus, and Deep Purple. Their first album, Dubois Died Today, was released on independent label Talkieo in June 2007. In 2010, they appeared on the French television show Taratata, presented by Nagui, to promote their follow-up album, Something You Might Like. They also performed live on Belgian television. The album resulted in three music videos, for the songs "I Do", "When You Know" and "How I Needed you". "When You Know" is also the theme song for the French television series Detectives.

In 2013, the band released their third album To Win the World, certified platinum in Belgium.

They have toured extensively in France, Belgium, Switzerland and the Netherlands. In 2014 they played a sold-out Forest National in Brussels (9000 capacity) as well as a sold-out club tour all around Belgium.

The band has had tracks included in the sequel to Largo Winch (the film adaptation).

In 2016 their 4th album, Colours, was released.

In 2017, many of their songs were incorporated into the soundtrack of the film The Son of Bigfoot and its sequel Bigfoot Family.

== In popular culture ==
Grupo Antena 3, a Spanish business concern used the Puggy song "We Had It Made" in promotional campaign when Grupo Antena 3 announced its name change to Atresmedia Group on 6 March 2013.

== Discography ==
=== Albums ===
Albums and details	Peak positions		
Albums and details	BEL (Fl)	BEL (Wa)	FRA
Dubois Died Today: Released: 2007; Label: Talkieo	–	–	–
Something You Might Like: Released: 2010; Label: Mercury Records	–	2	27
To Win the World: Released: 2013; Label: Mercury	56	1	26
Colours: Released: 2016; Label: Mercury	40	1	35
Are We There Yet?: Released: 2025; Label: Believe	–	4	–

=== EPs ===
- Teaser (2009)
- Radio Kitchen (2024)

=== Singles ===
Year	Single	Peak positions					Album
Year	Single	BEL (Fl) Ultratop	BEL (Fl) Ultratip	BEL (Wa) Ultratop	BEL (Wa) Ultratip	FRA	Album
2009	"I Do"	–	–	–	4	–	Something You Might Like
2010	"When You Know"	–	35	6	–	–	Something You Might Like
2011	"How I Needed You"	–	–	17	–	–	Something You Might Like
2011	"We Have It Made"	–	–	–	9	–	Something You Might Like
2011	"Something You Might Like"	–	–	–	23	–	Something You Might Like
2012	"To Win the World"	–	35	22	–	–	To Win the World
2013	"Last Day on Earth (Something Small)"	–	–	8	–	176	To Win the World
2013	"Goes Like This"	–	36	–	6	–	To Win the World
2016	"Lonely Town"	–	–	5	–	171	Colours
2016	"Soul"	–	–	16	–	–	Colours
2016	"Change the Colours"	–	–	18	–	–	Colours
2023	"Never Give Up"	–	–	12	–	–	Are We There Yet?
2025	"On My Mind"	–	–	16	–	–	Are We There Yet?
2025	"Mirror" (featuring Maëlle)	–	–	18	–	–	Are We There Yet?
2026	"For a Minute"	–	–	19	–	–	Are We There Yet?
