= Paw Patrol: The Dino Movie =

2026 animated film by Cal Brunker

- Theatrical release poster
- Directed by: Cal Brunker
- Written by: Cal Brunker; Bob Barlen
- Based on: Paw Patrol by Keith Chapman
- Produced by: Jennifer Dodge; Laura Clunie; Toni Stevens
- Starring: Carter Young; Mckenna Grace; Terry Crews; Jennifer Hudson; Fortune Feimster; Jameela Jamil; Paris Hilton; Snoop Dogg; Henry Bolan
- Edited by: Ed Fuller
- Music by: Pinar Toprak
- Production company: Spin Master Entertainment
- Distributed by: Elevation Pictures (Canada); Paramount Pictures (Worldwide) (Note: through Paramount Animation and Nickelodeon Movies)
- Release dates: August 3, 2026 (Los Angeles); August 14, 2026 (United States and Canada)
- Running time: 88 minutes
- Country: Canada
- Language: English
- Budget: $40 million
- Box office: $160 million

Paw Patrol: The Dino Movie is a 2026 Canadian animated adventure comedy film based on the television series Paw Patrol created by Keith Chapman. The sequel to Paw Patrol: The Mighty Movie (2023), it is directed by Cal Brunker, who co-wrote the screenplay with Bob Barlen. The ensemble voice cast includes Carter Young, Mckenna Grace, Terry Crews, Jennifer Hudson, Fortune Feimster, Jameela Jamil, Bill Nye, Paris Hilton, Snoop Dogg, and Henry Bolan. The film also features several cast members from both the television series and the previous films reprising their roles, and with others joining the cast. In the film, the Paw Patrol crash-lands on a dinosaur populated island and are thrown into a series of rescues caused by Mayor Humdinger's reckless mining in hopes of him exploiting the island for its natural resources and the diamonds, which later inadvertently caused a dormant volcano to erupt.

In September 2023, before the release of Paw Patrol: The Mighty Movie, a third Paw Patrol film was announced to be in development with a planned 2026 release date. Returning crew members were announced soon after, including Brunker as a director. Mikros Image in Montreal, like its predecessors, returned to handle the animation, this time collaborating in Paris, with the casting of Grace, Hudson and Feimster being announced the following year. The film is based on the Dino Rescue sub-theme of the main show.

Paw Patrol: The Dino Movie premiered at the Paramount studio lot in Los Angeles on August 3, 2026, and was theatrically released on August 14 in Canada by Elevation Pictures, and worldwide by Paramount Pictures. Like its predecessors, the film received positive reviews from critics, and was a commercial success, grossing $160 million worldwide on a $40 million budget. A fourth film is in development and scheduled to be released in 2029.

== Plot ==
Following the defeat of Victoria Vance (Note: As depicted in Paw Patrol: The Mighty Movie (2023)), and while out at sea, the Paw Patrol saves the boat captain Dave and his family from a boat fire where Marshall makes a daring rescue of the family's pet cat. Marshall then tells Chase of his belief that rescue pups don't make mistakes.

As the team continues their journey, they end up caught in a storm and are washed up on an uncharted island that did not appear on their map. Ryder gives the pups new survival gear before they explore the island, but Marshall accidentally awakens a sleeping Spinosaurus. As the Spinosaurus chases them, they are saved by a wheelchair-using Bernese Mountain Dog puppy named Rex, who knows how to communicate with the dinosaurs, including his Tyrannosaurus friend Timmy. The pups are surprised and initially scared to learn that dinosaurs are still alive on the island and Rex reveals that he was also afraid of them when he crash landed on the island two years ago, but took the time to befriend them while also using the island's resources to build a large treehouse. As Rex shows the Paw Patrol around the island, the team befriends the dinosaurs and Ryder realizes they have made a huge scientific discovery. The team chooses to inform the public.

In Adventure City, Mayor Humdinger is released from prison alongside the Kitten Catastrophe Crew. Initially claiming to be a changed man, Humdinger quickly reverts to his old ways when he sees a television news report of the Paw Patrol discovering the island and naming it "Dino Island" as a background camera shot reveals a large, undiscovered reserve of diamonds. He hires survivalist guide Harper Cutlass and demolitions expert Alistair Stonewall, planning to steal the diamonds and make himself rich.

As scientists and researchers make their way to Dino Island, the Paw Patrol sets up a base camp on the island, allowing them to work with the people to study the dinosaurs. When a branch gets stuck in Rex's water wheel and prevents the pups from washing some dinosaurs, Marshall goes to fix it and discovers a baby red Tyrannosaurus wanting to play fetch with the branch. When the baby Tyrannosaurus accidentally falls into the river, Marshall jumps in and protects him as they fall down a waterfall. The baby Tyrannosaurus follows Marshall back to the rest of the team, where Rubble names him Rhubarb.

Humdinger, Cutlass, and Stonewall find their progress blocked by a large Brachiosaurus and end up pushing its foot aside to clear their path, though the dinosaur falls into a canyon and becomes stuck between the cliffs. The Paw Patrol arrives to the canyon, where Chase and Rocky secure a net beneath it and attach it to Marshall's winch. However, when the rope gets stuck in the cliffs and Marshall tries to free it, he accidentally deactivates his truck's stabilizers, causing the truck to fall into the canyon. Although Marshall escapes, he is left simply to watch while the rest of the team, with the help of Rex, Timmy, and the other dinosaurs, frees the Brachiosaurus, unaware of Humdinger's actions that caused it to fall.

Humdinger's team find the diamonds, but their initial methods are unsuccessful when Humdinger cannot mine the jewels with the axe. Harper sets a series of traps around the area to stop dinosaurs from interrupting them. Meanwhile, Rex encourages Marshall not to give up despite his mistakes as he grieves over his fire truck. Later, Humdinger's team sets off a series of dynamite, scaring the dinosaurs and causing a stampede. Marshall hitches a ride on Rhubarb and works with Skye to rescue a news reporter who was stuck in the stampede but both of them are caught up in the stampede and Marshall is knocked unconscious. He awakens uninjured, but with a bandaged leg in the base camp with Ryder, who reveals that Rhubarb has gone missing, and that the pups are out to find him. A distraught Marshall confesses that his repeated mistakes are shaking his confidence and thinks the team would be better off without him. Ryder reminds Marshall of the time they first met: when Marshall was trying out for the team, he became stuck at a wall-climbing obstacle, but refused to give up and continued long into the rainy night before finally climbing to the top of the wall. His persistence ultimately earned him a spot on the team, and the story inspires Marshall not to give up. The rest of the team returns without finding Rhubarb, but intend to continue the search the next morning. Unwilling to give up on his friend, Marshall ventures out to search for Rhubarb alone.

Marshall stumbles across one of Harper's net traps and is brought to Humdinger, who ignores Marshall's warnings that his excessive use of dynamite could cause the island's volcano to erupt. Rex, having followed Marshall, frees him, but they are too late to stop Humdinger from setting off the dynamite. The diamonds that are protecting the volcano fall off, and Marshall knew that the volcano is going to explode any time. The pair rushes back to Ryder, informing him of Humdinger's presence on the island just before the volcano explodes. The team sets out to save the humans and dinosaurs and guide them all to safety while Ryder reveals he has fixed Marshall's truck and has upgraded Rex and Timmy's gear. Marshall heads off to look for Rhubarb, but he encounters Humdinger, who confronts him and prepares to recapture him, but Marshall is rescued by Rhubarb, who manages to scare Humdinger off with a mighty roar.

Ryder and the rest of the team gathers the humans and dinosaurs in a small cavern, but a large lava flow leaves them trapped as Marshall and Rhubarb arrive, trying to put out the lava. Marshall realizes they are near a large mountain with a lake on top of it, and decides to work with Rhubarb cross the lava, though Marshall's truck gets stuck, forcing them to escape. Marshall then climbs the mountain without Rhubarb, but debris from the eruption knocks him down to the bottom and knocking him unconscious again. Remembering his past and Ryder's words, Marshall recovers and quickly climbs to the top. He then knocks down a series of rocks to break open the side of the mountain, which sends water crashing to the ground below, dispersing the lava and saving the island.

Marshall happily reunites with Rhubarb and the rest of the team where he is hailed a hero. Later, the Paw Patrol restores the island by planting the seeds while the apprehended Humdinger, Cutlass, and Stonewall shovel up dinosaur poop for fertilizer to avoid being sent to prison as Stonewall will not forgive Humdinger for his actions. In a ceremony on the island, Marshall gives Rex a new pup tag, making him an official member of the Paw Patrol and the caretaker of Dino Island.

== Voice cast ==
- Carter Young as Marshall, a clumsy Dalmatian who serves as a firefighting pup. Young replaces Christian Corrao from the series and the second film and Jesse Gervasi from the series.
- Mckenna Grace as Skye, a cockapoo and one of Marshall and Chase's closest friends who serves as the team's aviator pup. Grace reprises her role from the second film.
- Terry Crews as Alistair Stonewall, a mining expert/demolitions expert who allies with Mayor Humdinger.
- Meredith MacNeill as Harper Cutlass, a clumsy survivalist guide who allies with Mayor Humdinger.
- Ron Pardo as:
  - Cap'n Turbot, a marine biologist and a close friend of the Paw Patrol.
  - Mayor Humdinger, the Paw Patrol's arch-nemesis from Foggy Bottom.
    - Pardo reprises both of his roles from both the series and the previous films.
  - A barge captain
- Jennifer Hudson as Lilian Ledes, an Adventure City news reporter
- Hayden Chamberlain as Rex, a friendly paraplegic Bernese Mountain Dog who has been stranded on the island for years and is an expert in all things dinosaur related. Rex was introduced in the series during the Dino Rescue sub-series, where he operated in the Dino Wilds. Chamberlain replaces Austin Farley as the voice of Rex from the series.
- Fortune Feimster as Eugenia Bunsen, a historian and property caretaker of the museum.
- Jameela Jamil as Heidi Pothesis, an archaeologist and Eugenia's partner.
- Rain Janjua as Chase, a German Shepherd and Marshall's childhood friend who serves as a police pup. Janjua replaces Luke Dietz from the series, Christian Convery from the second film, and Iain Armitage from the first film.
- Bill Nye as Dr. Theo Rising, an archaeologist and expert on dinosaurs.
- Paris Hilton as Nancy, Dave's wife
- Snoop Dogg as Dave, a wealthy boat captain
- Henry Bolan as Ryder, a young boy who leads the Paw Patrol. Bolan replaces Benjamin Sivcevic from the series, Finn Lee-Epp from the second film, and Will Brisbin from the first film.
- Lucien Duncan-Reid as Rubble, an English Bulldog who serves as a construction pup. Duncan-Reid reprises his role from both the series and the Rubble and Crew series and replaces Luxton Handspiker from both the Rubble and Crew series and the second film.
- William Desrosiers as Rocky, a mixed-breed dog who serves as a recycling pup. Desrosiers replaces Billy Quinn from the series and Callum Shoniker from the previous films.
- Nylan Parthipan as Zuma, a chocolate Labrador who serves as an aquatic rescue pup. Parthipan reprises his role from the second film and voiced Wheeler from the Rubble and Crew series.
- Kamaia Fairburn as Delilah, the daughter of Dave and Nancy
- Darius Willis as Dustin, the son of Dave and Nancy, who is an aspiring social media influencer
- Sugith Varughese as a prison guard. Varughese reprises his role from the second film.
- Janet Rose Nguyen as Diner Patron #1
- Carlos Diaz as Diner Patron #2
- Athena Karkanis as a dinosaur doctor
- Doug Murray as a camera operator

== Production ==
=== Development ===
On September 26, 2023, three days before Paw Patrol: The Mighty Movie was released, Spin Master Entertainment announced that a third film was in development, scheduling it to be released in 2026. In October 2023, it was reported that Mikros Image in Montreal, like its predecessors, would handle the animation, this time collaborating in Paris. In April 2024, it was announced that Cal Brunker would return to direct, with Jennifer Dodge, Laura Clunie, and Toni Stevens also returning as producers. In February 2025, it was announced that the film would be titled Paw Patrol: The Dino Movie.

In February 2025, it was reported that Mikros' parent company, Technicolor Group, would shut down its operations immediately due to financial struggles and failures to find new investors. This led to Mikros' global operations ceasing work on current projects, including The Dino Movie. In March 2025, it was reported that Rodeo FX acquired Mikros' Paris and Canadian operations with the mission of continuing these projects.

=== Casting ===
In September 2024, Mckenna Grace (reprising her role as Skye from The Mighty Movie), Jennifer Hudson, and Fortune Feimster were announced as part of the cast, with Ron Pardo reprising his roles as both Cap'n Turbot and Mayor Humdinger. In May 2025, the rest of the cast was officially announced, including Jameela Jamil, Terry Crews, Paris Hilton, Snoop Dogg, Bill Nye, and Meredith MacNeill.

== Music ==
Paw Patrol: The Dino Movie

Film score by Pinar Toprak
- Released: August 14, 2026
- Recorded: 2026
- Venues: Budapest Scoring Orchestra, Budapest; Scotland's Studio, RSNO Centre, Glasgow
- Genre: Film score
- Length: 61:30
- Label: Spin Master
- Producer: Pinar Toprak

Pinar Toprak chronology
Lonely Planet (2024)	Paw Patrol: The Dino Movie (2026)

A new song from Backstreet Boys, "Bottle Up", was included in the film. In March 2026, it was announced that Pinar Toprak would be composing the score for the film, following her work on Paw Patrol: The Mighty Movie. In July 2026, Ava Max released a new song, "Work", for the film. The soundtrack album, which contains the score composed by Toprak and performed by the Royal Scottish National Orchestra, was released on August 14, 2026, coinciding with the film's theatrical release.

=== Track listing ===
No.	Title	Length
1.	"PAW Patrol: The Dino Movie"	1:44
2.	"It's Always a Cat"	3:58
3.	"Drifting Off Course"	1:01
4.	"Ready for Action"	1:27
5.	"Look at That View"	2:53
6.	"Follow Me"	3:05
7.	"I'm a Changed Man"	1:23
8.	"Breaking News"	2:29
9.	"I'll Get It"	1:07
10.	"Humdinger's Plan"	2:19
11.	"I Made a New Friend"	1:13
12.	"No Subtle Movements"	1:50
13.	"Brachiosaurus in Trouble"	2:13
14.	"He Must Have Slipped"	4:00
15.	"Filthy Stinking Rich"	2:36
16.	"You Need to Rest"	2:29
17.	"It's a Stampede"	2:32
18.	"PAW Patrol Tryouts"	5:01
19.	"Enough Dynamtie"	2:39
20.	"Humdinger Dance"	0:40
21.	"Humdinger Is Here"	1:22
22.	"It's the PAW Patrol"	1:49
23.	"Come On Little Buddy"	4:32
24.	"You're a Natural"	2:15
25.	"I Can Do This"	4:53
Total length:		61:30

=== Credits and personnel ===
Retrieved from Film Music Reporter:

- Music Supervisors: Dave Jordan and Justine von Winterfeldt
- Score Composed and Produced by: Pinar Toprak
- Music Editor: Shie Rozow
- Additional Music and Arrangements: Antonio Di Iorio and Emir Isilay
- Assistants to Pinar Toprak: Ece Muniroglu and Merve Tumba
- Score Mixed by: Michael Gossard
- Score Mix Assistant: Carissa Wong
- Lead Orchestrator: Zuzana Michlerová
- Orchestrators: Adam Klemens, Bernhard Philipp Eder, and David Federman
- Music Preparation: Dominik Svoboda
- Strings Recorded at: Budapest Scoring Orchestra
- Contracted by: Bálint Sapszon
- Conductor: Péter Illényi
- Orchestra Coordinator: Bertalan Veér
- Recording Engineer: Viktor Szabó
- Studio Assistants: Marcell Rokosz, and Levente Böde
- Librarians: Katalin Réti, Agnes Sapszon
- Studio and Orchestra: Provided by Scottish Digital Arts
- Musician Contractors: Ewen McKay and Paul Talkington on Behalf of Scottish Digital Arts
- Orchestra Woodwinds and Brass: Royal Scottish National Orchestra
- Woodwinds and Brass Recorded at: Scotland's Studio, RSNO Centre, Glasgow
- Conductor: Robert Baxter
- Recording Engineer: Hedd Morfett-Jones
- Digital Recordist: Marc McCouig
- Assistant Engineer: Sam McErlean
- Studio Assistants: Ahan Sengupta and Jennifer Imrie
- Studio Runner: Becca Murphy
- Music Preparation: Richard Payne and Megan Bousfield

== Release ==
Paw Patrol: The Dino Movie held its world premiere at the Paramount Pictures studio lot in Los Angeles on August 3, 2026, and was theatrically released on August 14. Elevation Pictures handles distribution in Canada, while Paramount Pictures handles worldwide distribution outside of Canada. It was originally set to be released on July 31, 2026, but in May 2025, it was pushed up one week before being delayed once again to its current date.

=== Home media ===
Paramount Home Entertainment released Paw Patrol: The Dino Movie on digital on September 29, 2026. The movie was streamed on Paramount+ on November 13, 2026, before being released on Blu-ray and DVD four days later on November 17.

== Reception ==
=== Box office ===
As of October 11, 2026, Paw Patrol: The Dino Movie has grossed $53.2 million in the United States and Canada, and $107 million in other territories, for a worldwide total of $160 million. It was produced on a budget of $40 million.

In the United States and Canada, Paw Patrol: The Dino Movie was released alongside The End of Oak Street and The Brink of War, and was projected to gross $20 million from 3,545 theaters in its opening weekend. It made $7.3 million on its first day, with $1.9 million in Thursday night previews, ranking third behind The End of Oak Street. The film grossed $20.5 million during its opening weekend, ranking fourth behind The End of Oak Street.

Internationally, Paw Patrol: The Dino Movie has grossed $54.7 million, with its highest-grossing markets being France ($9.5 million), China ($9.1 million), Germany ($4.8 million), the United Kingdom ($4.8 million), Japan ($3.2 million), Poland ($2.7 million), Spain ($2.0 million), Mexico ($1.7 million), the Netherlands ($1.3 million), and Brazil ($1.0 million).

=== Critical response ===
On review aggregation website Rotten Tomatoes, 83% of 35 critics' reviews are positive, with an average rating of 6.0/10. The website's consensus reads: "A colorful prehistoric adventure packed with lively action and engaging problem solving, PAW Patrol: The Dino Movie delivers exactly what its youngest fans want." Metacritic, which uses a weighted average, assigned the film a score of 47 out of 100, based on four critics, indicating "mixed or average" reviews. Audiences polled by CinemaScore gave the film an average grade of "A" on an A+ to F scale (the same grade as The Mighty Movie), while those at PostTrak surveyed that 63% of audiences would "definite recommend" it.

Frank Scheck of The Hollywood Reporter gave the film a positive review, writing: "These are not movies for adults by any stretch, but younger, and I mean younger, audiences have clearly embraced the adorable puppy search-and-rescue team, so their adult chaperones might as well give in and bring them to a matinee showing." Casper Salmon of Variety gave the film a mixed review, saying that it "does eventually cohere into a half-decent entertainment," adding: "Some well-conceived action sequences, set against a backdrop of surprisingly apocalyptic volcanic activity, drum up a fair bit of jeopardy and suspense." Catherine Bray of The Guardian gave the film two out of five, writing: "Children deserve charm and at least some degree of wit from their entertainment – and Paw Patrol: The Dino Movie has neither."

William Bibbiani of TheWrap gave the film a mixed review, saying "the filmmakers put real care into disability representation while also conveying other, more questionable themes," also adding it was "a colorful surprise, full of friendly imagery and somewhat engaging set pieces." He criticized the characterization as "thin", the dialogue as "eye-rolling", and the plot as "simplistic", but notes: "[T]hat's where "it's for kids" can be treated as an acceptable excuse. Movies for young kids aren't only teaching them about the world, they're also teaching kids how to watch movies." He concluded his review by stating, "But even then they'll be able to say The Dino Movie was bright and spirited, and the filmmakers cared enough about kids with disablities to treat them with respect and represent them in a responsible manner — while, admittedly, also trying to sell toys."

=== Accolades ===
Award	Date of ceremony	Category	Nominee(s)	Result	Ref.
Hollywood Music in Media Awards	November 18, 2026	Best Original Song – Animated Film	"Bottle Up" – Ed Sheeran, Savan Kotecha, Johnny McDaid and Ilya Salmanzadeh	Nominated	
Nickelodeon Kids' Choice Awards	November 14, 2026	Favorite Animated Movie	Paw Patrol: The Dino Movie	Nominated	
Nickelodeon Kids' Choice Awards	November 14, 2026	Favourite Female Voice From an Animated Movie	Mckenna Grace	Nominated	

== See also ==
- List of films featuring dinosaurs
