= Bigfoot Family =

2020 animated film

- Theatrical release poster
- Directed by: Ben Stassen; Jeremy Degruson
- Screenplay by: Bob Barlen; Cal Brunker
- Story by: Ben Stassen
- Based on: A character by: Bob Barlen; Cal Brunker
- Produced by: Ben Stassen; Caroline Van Iseghem; Matthieu Zeller
- Starring: Lindsey Alena; Laila Berzins; Sandy Fox; Grant George; David Lodge; Jules Medcraft; Joe Ochman; Roger Craig Smith; Michael Sorich; Joe J. Thomas
- Cinematography: Ben Stassen; Jeremy Degruson
- Music by: Puggy
- Production companies: nWave Pictures; Octopolis
- Distributed by: Belga Films (Belgium); Apollo Films; TF1 Studio (France)
- Release dates: 15 June 2020 (Annecy); 5 August 2020 (France)
- Running time: 97 minutes
- Countries: Belgium; France
- Language: English
- Box office: $11 million

Bigfoot Family is a 2020 animated fantasy adventure comedy film directed by Ben Stassen and Jeremy Degruson, and written by Bob Barlen and Cal Brunker. An English-language Belgian-French co-production, it is the sequel to the 2017 film The Son of Bigfoot. In the film, Bigfoot has become famous after returning home and uses his fame to fight an oil company. When he disappears without a trace, it is up to Adam, his mother, and their animal friends to rescue him. It premiered at the 2020 Annecy International Animation Film Festival, before releasing in France and Belgium on 5 August 2020.

== Plot ==
A year after Bigfoot returns home, (Note: As depicted in The Son of Bigfoot (2017)) Adam becomes overwhelmed with the attention his father's newfound fame has brought to the family. He is also struggling to confess his feelings to his crush Emma.

Bigfoot wants to use his fame for a good cause. After some protesters send him a letter about trying to stop Xtract, an Alaska oil company that claims to have zero environmental impact on wildlife, Bigfoot decides to travel to Alaska to help them. Adam helps his father by uploading a promotional video to social media. Swathes of protesters arrive to support Bigfoot. One night, while trying to get a closer look at the company after hearing a loud rumble, Bigfoot mysteriously disappears. Adam and his mother Shelly journey with Wilbur and Trapper to Alaska in their van to find and rescue him.

Arriving in Alaska, Adam and Shelly meet with Arlo Woodstock, the protester who last saw Bigfoot. Shelly follows Woodstock while Adam, Wilbur, and Trapper stay behind. While waiting in the van, they are ambushed by Xtract guards who tranquilize Wilbur and Trapper, but Adam escapes. Adam encounters a wolf who threatens to hurt him, but he strikes a deal with Adam to help him.

The wolf guides Adam to Xtract's worksite before departing. Xtract is revealed to be destroying wildlife by using small explosions to excavate oil. Adam explores the inside of the company and finds Xtract CEO Connor Mandrake planning to set up a massive bomb so that he can excavate the oil easier, but this will destroy the valley. Adam records Mandrake on his phone to expose him. Afterwards, Adam is found by Woodstock, but Adam finds out that Woodstock actually works for Xtract and is responsible for taking Bigfoot and Shelly. Woodstock captures Adam and pushes him into the underground mines.

Mandrake prepares the bomb. After finding Shelly and freeing Bigfoot, Adam escapes with them through the mines. Xtract drones are sent to stop them, but Bigfoot destroys them. While they escape, Adam manages to upload the videos, exposing Xtract online, before losing his phone. Adam turns back and defuses the bomb, but Mandrake gets a backup bomb that cannot be turned off to trigger the explosion. With help from Wilbur and Trapper, Bigfoot takes hold of it and throws it in the air, creating a signal explosion. Mandrake confronts them, but the news shows up in a helicopter, as does the police. Mandrake attempts to escape, but is interrupted by a hare and the wolf from earlier. He slips into an oil puddle, and a moose throws Woodstock in after him.

Some time later, Adam meets with Emma, who reveals that one of the videos he accidentally uploaded was the one exposing his feelings to her. He asks Emma out and she accepts. Emma kisses Adam while his eavesdropping family congratulates him.

== Voice cast ==
- Jules Medcraft as Adam (Note: Credited as "Jules Wojciechowski".), Bigfoot's son who inherited his abilities. He was previously voiced by Pappy Faulkner in the previous film.
- Roger Craig Smith as:
  - Dr. James "Jim" Harrison, a.k.a "Bigfoot", Adam's father who suffered a genetic mutation into Bigfoot as revealed in the last film. He was previously voiced by Chris Parson in the previous film.
  - Snowflake
  - Xtract Guard
- Lindsey Alena as Shelly, Adam's mother and Bigfoot's wife. She was previously voiced by Marieve Herington in the previous film.
- Dino Andrade as a drone operator for Xtract
- George Babbit as Cy Wheeler, Becky's agent who arranges cheaply-made merchandise for Bigfoot
- Laila Berzins as Weecha, a raccoon and Trapper's wife
- Joey Camen as:
  - Principal Jones, the principal of Adam's school
  - A moose that helps Adam
  - A Northwestern wolf that helps Adam
- Scott Chernoff as Shamus
- Sandy Fox as Tina, a red squirrel
- James Fredrick as an Xtract guard #2
- Grant George as Connor Mandrake, a greedy business magnate and CEO of Xtract who is determined to destroy Rocky Valley
- Jessica Gee-George as a girl at Adam's school
- Kyle Hebert as an Xtract guard
- David Lodge as Arlo Woodstock, one of the environmental protesters Bigfoot meets in Alaska who is later revealed to be Connor Mandrake's second-in-command
- Chris Niosi as Engineer #1
- Joe Ochman as Trapper, a raccoon
- Shyloh Oostwald as Emma, Adam's friend and love interest
- Donte Paris as Student #3
- Jeff Rector as the news anchor
- Della Saba as a student at Adam's school
- Cyndia Scott as Doris, a feisty pilot who takes Bigfoot to Alaska
- Michael Sorich as Wilbur, a kodiak bear
- Joe J. Thomas as Steve, a European green woodpecker

== Production ==
Production for a sequel to The Son of Bigfoot, initially entitled Bigfoot Superstar, began shortly before the release of nWave Pictures' seventh animated feature film, The Queen's Corgi. The studio teased the production of the movie at the 2020 Paris Images Digital Summit.

=== Music ===
After providing the score for its predecessor, music band Puggy returned to score the soundtrack of Bigfoot Family. Puggy collaborated with Sylvie Hoarau for the single "Out in the Open" with the authorization of Sony Music, which is featured in the film during Adam's road trip to Alaska.

== Release ==
In June 2020, Bigfoot Family premiered at the Annecy International Animation Film Festival on 15 June 2020. At the festival, it was nominated for Best Animated Feature Film. The film later released in France and Belgium on 5 August 2020.

Bigfoot Family premiered on Netflix, where it premiered as a "Netflix Original" in select territories, on 26 February 2021. It topped as the #1 movie on Netflix in the US, Canada, Australia, New Zealand, and the UK on its opening weekend, and remained as such in the US for six days in a row.

== Controversy ==
In March 2021, the movie was targeted by the Canadian Energy Centre, an agency created and funded by the government of Alberta to promote the oil industry and defend it from critics, including environmentalists. The Canadian Energy Centre, also called the "energy war room," published a website that accused the movie and its American distributor, Netflix, of "brainwashing" children with misinformation. The website, which was titled Support Canadian Energy, included a petition, and 3,400 letters were sent to the movie company. The controversy increased viewership on Netflix, and the movie director thanked the CEC for the free publicity.
