= The Son of Bigfoot =

2017 animated fantasy comedy film

- French theatrical release poster
- Directed by: Jérémy Degruson; Ben Stassen
- Screenplay by: Bob Barlen; Cal Brunker
- Based on: Son of Bigfoot by: Bob Barlen; Cal Brunker
- Produced by: Ben Stassen; Caroline Van Iseghem
- Starring: Laila Berzins; Pappy Faulkner; Sandy Fox; Marieve Herington; Joe Ochman; Chris Parson; Alan Shearman; Michael Sorich; Terrence Stone; Joe J. Thomas
- Cinematography: Barbara Meyers
- Music by: Puggy
- Production companies: StudioCanal; nWave Pictures; Belga Productions; Illuminata Pictures
- Distributed by: Belga Films (Belgium); StudioCanal (France)
- Release date: 26 July 2017 (France)
- Running time: 92 minutes
- Countries: Belgium; France
- Language: English
- Budget: $20 million
- Box office: $47 million

The Son of Bigfoot (released in some territories as Bigfoot Junior) is a 2017 animated fantasy comedy film directed by Ben Stassen and Jeremy Degruson. Written by Bob Barlen and Cal Brunker based on their own original screenplay Son of Bigfoot, the film follows a teen boy who, after beginning to erupt unusual changes, sets out to find his father, who happens to be Bigfoot and had gone into hiding from a corrupt CEO of a hair company.

Upon release, the film received positive reviews from critics and grossed $47 million worldwide against its $20 million budget. A sequel, titled Bigfoot Family, was released on 5 August 2020.

== Plot ==
HairCo. is a megacorporation run by Wallace Eastman that specializes in improving people's hair. His helicopter chases after a scientist named Dr. Harrison, who escapes by jumping into a river.

12 years later, Adam Harrison, the son of Dr. Harrison, lives with his mother Shelly in Portland. He keeps getting harassed by the school bullies Tony, Dale, and Garcia, but is the mutual crush of a kindhearted girl named Emma. Over time, Adam develops enhanced hearing and vision, and his hair and feet grow rapidly.

After discovering not only the fact that his father is alive, but also his current location from a box Shelly had kept hidden, Adam sneaks out to look for him. He discovers that his father is Bigfoot, who has been hiding deep in the forest for years to protect himself and his family from Eastman, who is eager to run scientific experiments with his special DNA. What neither of them know was that a truck driver named Fat Dan had nearly run over Adam who was saved by Bigfoot, got some footage of it, and put it in the newspaper.

Adam learns that he possesses abilities similar to Bigfoot, including enhanced senses, running at high speeds while barefoot, healing others, and communicating with animals, some of which are Bigfoot's friends. It was mentioned by Bigfoot that he was originally a human who studied hair growth and learned that he had a mutation associated with Neanderthals. Harrison went on to leave his family after HairCo. stole his work and ransacked his house. Meanwhile, Eastman hears about the sighting and follows the traces to Bigfoot. As Shelly pursues Adam, Eastman's men capture her at a roadblock. She is brought to Eastman who has figured out that Dr. Harrison is Bigfoot. Eastman's men roam the forest to search for more evidence. The raccoons see Shelly being taken to a black van and run off to warn Bigfoot. Adam is apprehended and used as bait to lure Bigfoot, ending with Bigfoot being captured.

Eastman and his scientist Dr. Billingsley begin their experiment on Bigfoot. The hair sample is tested on Billingsley's intern, causing him to grow long hair all over his body. With the help of Bigfoot's animal friends, Adam sneaks into HairCo. and reaches Bigfoot, but he refuses to cooperate. Eastman arrives and tries to escort Adam out, but Adam activates the fire alarm, causing chaos. Adam runs back to Bigfoot and convinces him to leave. Before escaping, they release toxic gases inside the facility. Back at her house, Shelly is under watch by Eastman's guards, who find Adam's chopped hair growing and realize he is also a Bigfoot. After they call Eastman to inform him, Shelly subdues one of them, but is restrained and taken by the other.

Eastman confronts Adam and Bigfoot outside, holding Shelly captive. He states that he only wants Adam now and throws Bigfoot off the facility bridge. Adam pulls out a flare gun he found inside HairCo. and shoots toward the building. The flare combusts with the toxic gases, leading to the destruction of the HairCo. facility. Adam searches for Bigfoot and finds him unconscious. Remembering his powers, Adam heals Bigfoot and revives him. Eastman is tranquilized by Shelly as Bigfoot states that he is done with hiding.

Bigfoot returns home and the animals have taken to living with the family. A magazine cover shows that Eastman has been arrested for his illegal activities. On his way to school, Adam's bullies attempt to haze him again, but Adam tells them that he has finally had enough and asks to be left alone. When the bullies refuse to comply, Adam's animal friends scare them into leaving him alone and cause them to crash their bikes. Adam dismisses his animal friends as Emma spots the scene and asks about it. Adam begins to explain his life to her, walking barefoot after tossing his broken shoes onto the electric wires.

== Cast ==
- Pappy Faulkner as Adam Harrison, a shy and lonely but good-natured 13-year-old boy who goes looking for his long-lost father
- Chris Parson as:
  - Bigfoot / Dr. Harrison, Adam's father whose appearance is the result of a genetic mutation
  - Guard at Desk
- Marieve Herington as Shelly Harrison, Adam's mother
- Terrence Stone as Wallace Eastman, the CEO of HairCo. who pursues Bigfoot
- Laila Berzins as:
  - Weecha, a raccoon and Trapper's wife
  - 911 Operator
- Sandy Fox as Tina, a red squirrel
- Joe Ochman as:
  - Trapper, a raccoon and Weecha's husband
  - Tom
- Johnny Wesley as Dr. Billingsley, an elderly scientist working for Eastman
- Michael Sorich as Wilbur, a Kodiak bear
- Shylo Summer as Emma, a girl who likes Adam
- Joe J. Thomas as Steve, a European green woodpecker
- Cinda Adams as:
  - Secretary
  - Waitress
- John Allsop as Agent #2
- George Babbit as Truck Driver
- Tom Blank as Mr. Blakestone
- Barry D. Buckner as Garcia, one of Adam's bullies
- Joey Camen as Principal Jones, the principal of Adam's school
- Mari Devon as:
  - Female Reporter
  - Mildred
- Jeff Doucette as:
  - Fat Dan, a truck driver who photographs Bigfoot saving Adam
  - Tim
  - Tech Support Operator
- David Epstein as Charlie
- James Frederick as Gate Guard
- Victor Friedland as Prison Guard
- Grant George as:
  - Road Block Agent
  - Forensic Expert
- Kyle Hebert as Simpson
- Brody Hessin as an Intern who tries to get Dr. Billingsley to sign his volunteer paper
- Steve Kramer as Mr. President
- Lex Lang as Japanese Man #3
- Yuri Lowenthal as:
  - Tony, one of Adam's bullies
  - Japanese Man #2
- Nicholas Marj as Dale, one of Adam's bullies
- Domonic Paris as Guard Commander
- Tara Platt as Katrina
- Roger Craig Smith as White Rabbit
- Kirk Thornton as Japanese Man #1
- Victor Weaver as:
  - Secret Service Agent
  - Guard #2

== Reception ==
On review aggregator Rotten Tomatoes, the film has an approval rating of 75% based on 20 reviews, with an average rating of 5.8/10. The site's critical consensus reads, "An animated feature that's more of the same, Son of Bigfoot lacks innovation but provides entertaining fodder for younger viewers." Ben Kenigsberg of The New York Times wrote: "More or less does what it sets out to do, which is to offer enough visual activity and bromides to keep the very young interested."

== Sequel ==
In October 2018, Stassen announced that a sequel was in the works, due out in mid-2020, which would take place a couple of years after the first movie. In June 2020, Bigfoot Family premiered at the 2020 Annecy International Animation Film Festival.
