= Dr. Dolittle (franchise) =

American comedy film franchise

- Official franchise logo, as released in 2020
- Based on: Doctor Dolittle novels by Hugh Lofting
- Starring: Rex Harrison; Eddie Murphy; Kyla Pratt; Robert Downey Jr.
- Distributed by: 20th Century Fox (1967–present); Universal Pictures (2020 film only)
- Country: United States
- Language: English
- Budget: ~$353,500,000 (total of 7 films)
- Box office: ~$730,971,580 (total of 6 films)

The Dr. Dolittle franchise consists of American feature-length family films, based on the book series written by Hugh Lofting, Doctor Dolittle. Like their source material, the plot of each respective film follows the titular characters' adventures given their abilities to communicate with animals. The series consists of the original fantasy-period piece musical movie, a contemporary comedy remake (followed by its four sequels), and a period piece fantasy-adventure reboot.

Each film has been met with poor to mixed-at-best critical reception. With seven films, the gross box office return is approximately $730,971,580 total, with the financial information that is available.

== Origin ==
A series of children's books written by Hugh Lofting, which center around Doctor John Dolittle, with the first installment released in 1920 titled, The Story of Doctor Dolittle, Being the History of His Peculiar Life at Home and Astonishing Adventures in Foreign Parts. A number of sequels and shorts stories followed from 1924 to 1952. Lofting originally created the character for letters he sent home to his children, from the trenches of WWI. The plot takes place in Victorian England, and center around the adventures of Dolittle, who can speak to animals, and takes place in a fictional village called Puddleby-on-the-Marsh in West Country of south-western England.

== Films ==
Film	U.S. release date	Director(s)	Screenwriter(s)	Story by	Producer(s)
Doctor Dolittle	December 19, 1967	Richard Fleischer	Leslie Bricusse	Leslie Bricusse	Arthur P. Jacobs
Dr. Dolittle	June 26, 1998	Betty Thomas	Nat Mauldin & Larry Levin	Nat Mauldin & Larry Levin	John Davis, Joseph M. Singer & David T. Friendly
Dr. Dolittle 2	June 22, 2001	Steve Carr	Larry Levin	Larry Levin	John Davis
Dr. Dolittle 3	April 25, 2006	Rich Thorne	Nina Colman	Nina Colman	John Davis
Dr. Dolittle: Tail to the Chief	March 4, 2008	Craig Shapiro	Matt Lieberman & Kathleen Laccinole	Matt Lieberman	John Davis & Brian Manis
Dr. Dolittle: Million Dollar Mutts	May 19, 2009	Alex Zamm	Daniel Altiere & Steven Altiere	Daniel Altiere & Steven Altiere	John Davis & Brian Manis
Dolittle	January 17, 2020	Stephen Gaghan	Stephen Gaghan & John Whittington	Thomas Shepherd	Joe Roth, Susan Downey & Jeff Kirschenbaum
Doctor Dolittle: King of the Wild	TBA	Timothy Reckart	Cal Brunker & Bob Barlen	Cal Brunker & Bob Barlen	Saxton Washburn

=== Original ===
==== Doctor Dolittle (1967) ====
Dr. John Dolittle, an Englishman from a small village in the United Kingdom, specializes in providing medical care for and verbally conversing with various Fauna. Because of his care for animals, his practice with patients has fallen by the wayside. Dolittle helps a seal escape a circus by dressing her as a human. When it's observed that he pushes her into the ocean, Dolittle's newfound business in communicating with and helping animals, finds him placed in an insane asylum. Dolittle's closest friends, both animal and human, come to the rescue when he is placed on trial for suspected murder. After freeing him from captivity, together with Dolittle – Emma Fairfax, and the animal friends – escape and set sail on a boat to find a legendary creature, the Great Pink Sea Snail. The team discovers the snail on a reclusive island, after a run-in with the indigenous tribe that lives there. Dolittle is surprised to find that the people are fluent in English, due to their studies of various novels that wash ashore. After their discovery, the Great Pink Sea Snail carries Emma, and the animals back to England. Though Emma expresses her love for him, Dolittle insists she returns to her home. Dolittle resolves to studying the islanders, and in finding another mythical animal called the Giant Luna Moth. After time has passed, Emma returns to the island with the animals to relay good news: Doctor Dolittle has been proven innocent, and can return home. The group begins their voyage, with Dolittle riding the back of the giant moth.

=== Remake series ===
==== Dr. Dolittle (1998) ====
An American surgeon, Dr. John Dolittle begins to remember his childhood abilities of communicating with animals following a mild fender bender. He first questions his sanity after hitting his head in the accident, while eventually remembering the extent of his gifts. This re-found talent quickly triggers a series of events, when Dolittle finds himself overwhelmed with animals that seek out his help, including: an alcoholic monkey, injured fowl, and a severely depressed tiger on the verge of suicidal tendencies. When his peculiar behavior is observed by others including his wife Lisa, Dolittle finds himself admitted to a psychiatric hospital. Believing his abilities are a hindrance to his practice, and his family life, Dolittle decides to go back to work as a respected surgeon. In doing so, he realizes that his relationship with his youngest daughter has become strained. Dolittle decides to again help his animal friends, and tells his daughter that she can do and be anything that she wants to. Together, he and Lucky set out to help the unstable tiger. Stealing the feline from the circus for an emergency operation, Dolittle's actions again attract the attention and scrutiny of his peers. John's father Archer, reveals to Lisa that his son's professed ability to talk to animals is real and has been since the latter was a child. Lisa decides to support her husband and with her support, Dolittle successfully removes the cause of the tiger's pain and mental distress. Following the experience, John decides to be a surgeon and a veterinary physician so that he can continue to serve as the voice of, and care for the animals.

==== Dr. Dolittle 2 (2001) ====
After several years of officially practicing as a veterinarian, Dolittle continues to provide help to the animals that seek him out. Since becoming a celebrity, Dolittle finds his work-load increasing, as he travels the world performing his skills. Returning home, he scolds his daughter Charisse for her school failures, while gifting his younger daughter Maya with a Chameleon. At Charisse's birthday party, a group of animals approach him providing a message from the Godbeaver. Agreeing to meet with the leader of the animal mafia, Dolittle agrees to helping the animals in preserving their forest habitat from a large logging company. The group decides that their best argument to defend the area will be to protect the endangered species of bear, known as the Pacific Western. However, there is only a female named Ava living in its area. Dedicated to helping the animals of the forest, he persuades the Pacific Western male named Archie to aid their cause. Raised in captivity, Archie agrees with the prospect of a girlfriend, but must first revert to his natural instincts under Dolittle's tutelage. Upon taking his family on a month-long vacation in the woods, Ava agrees to placing a relationship with a Grizzly Bear named Sonny that she is romantically involved with on hold, until a month's time when Dolittle will present her with a bear she can love of her own kind. Dolittle prepares Archie for his courting of Ava, as well as a confrontation with her less-than-affectionate Grizzly. After a failed attempt to emulate Dolittle's own love for his wife, Archie secludes himself into a newfound cave. When Dolittle tries to reinvigorate Archie, the latter finds his inner bear after an insult from the Doctor makes him angry. Ava and Archie spend the day together, though Sonny interferes and forces Ava to leave. As time is running out, Archie decides to retrieve a bee hive in a dangerous location for Ava, who in turn finds the motivation to dump Sonny. After destroying a restaurant, the apprentice of logging mogul Joe Potter tranquilizes Archie and takes him into confinement where he'll be sold to a Mexican circus. Discovering his daughter has his same abilities, Dolittle's determination to save his animal friends reinvigorated. An army of animals prevent the logging company from a demolition of the forest, as Dolittle begins renegotiations. All over the world animals go on strike, including Shamu at SeaWorld. After some time, Potter relinquishes and the forest is effectively saved. Dolittle begins to work with Charisse in talking to and helping animals, while Archie and Ava as a couple present their two cubs.

==== Dr. Dolittle 3 (2006) ====
Maya Dolittle, the youngest daughter of Dr. John Dolittle, realizes that she has inherited her father's ability to talk to animals. As she develops this gift and tries to use it in her assistant-veterinary job, she continues to find trouble in her pursuits. In the meantime her friends start to wonder if she has gone crazy. While John, and the older daughter Charisse, are away on expeditions to help animals, her mother sends Maya to a summer camp so that she can get away for a while. Upon her arrival, Maya uses her ability to communicate with animals to save the camp ranch from being bought out by a neighboring farm company. Over time she realizes that her abilities to talk to animals, may prove helpful to a weak entry from the camp, in an upcoming rodeo competition.

==== Dr. Dolittle: Tail to the Chief (2008) ====
Just as her father and older sister had before her, Maya Dolittle has gained a reputation as the girl who can talk to animals. While John is away on expeditions to help animals, and Charisse is off at college, the U.S. president seeks the help of the Dolittles. Maya takes John's place, aiding their dog Daisy, who's been causing some unruly circumstances at the White House. During her visit, she ends up becoming involved with a matter of international importance. The President also asks for Maya's help in saving an African forest that is being considered for land development. During a dinner with the royalty of the forest, Maya discovers that the chief security for the President, has been corrosively been sabotaging the prince to sell the land and make millions. With Maya's help, the forest is saved.

==== Dr. Dolittle: Million Dollar Mutts (2009) ====
Maya Dolittle, who's about to begin veterinary schooling, decides that given her unique talents she doesn't need to. After being discovered helping animals by a celebrity named Tiffany Monaco, the star asks Maya to come to Hollywood to help her needful puppy. Once in Hollywood, Maya joins Tiffany in a television series called The Animal Talkers. While she is there, she finds her old friend Monkey has been pursuing an acting career. After some time, Maya realizes that the show is not dedicated to assisting the animals, and decides to return home. As she starts her schooling, she finds that her love-interest from Hollywood will also be going to school with her. Monkey quits Hollywood, to come and assist Maya in her pursuits.

=== Reboot ===
==== Dolittle (2020) ====
In the 19th century England, Dr. John Dolittle lives in the solitude of his mansion, following the death of his beloved wife. His only companionship is a vast array of exotic animals, that come to him for help since he has the unique ability of being able to speak to them. When a young Queen Alexandria Victoria becomes gravely ill, and after being convinced by his animal friends that he needs to begin making human connections again, Dolittle agrees. Upon meeting the Queen, he discovers that she has accidentally eaten a deadly nightshade in her tea that was placed in her tea by someone to kill her. Leaving behind some of his animals to watch over her, Dolittle sets sail with the rest of his animal crew, on a grand adventure to a legendary island to find that has the cure. Along the way he evades his lifelong rival Dr. Blair Müdfly, and becomes imprisoned by his father-in-law, the pirate-king Rassouli. After some time the king decides to honor the memory of his daughter and sets Dolittle and his friends free, providing them with his personal ship for their journey. Arriving at the island, Dolittle and his animal friends find the mythical dragon known as Ginko-Who-Soars. Initially attacking, Ginko collapses in pain. Dolittle discovers blockage in her bowels from the previous invaders that she has eaten. With Dolittle's help, she is relieved of her pain. The dragon guides them to the tree that his deceased wife had once told him about, which provides Dolittle with the cure. He and his entourage of animals return to the Queen, just in time to save her life. One of his friends, a stick insect, he had left behind to watch after the Queen reveals that one of the royal chairmen named Lord Thomas Badgley, was the culprit that attempted to assassinate her with the poison in her drink. Queen Victoria has him arrested for treason. Having once again found purpose and learning to cope with the sadness he feels in coping with the passing of his wife, Dolittle reopens his animal sanctuary and officially hires his young apprentice, Tommy Stubbins.

=== Animated film ===
==== Doctor Dolittle: King of the Wild (TBA) ====
In May 2026, another reimagining in the form of an animated film was announced as being in production. Directed by Timothy Reckart with a script written by Cal Brunker and Bob Barlen, the plot will follow the world-famous zoologist Doctor Dolittle, as he reunites with three estranged animal friends in attempts to clear his name following a legendary creature's unintentional transfer into the wrong hands; where the friends determine to complete a rescue mission for the creature and to save the entire animal kingdom. Saxton Washburn serves as producer, while the project will be a joint-venture production between Reel FX Animation, and Sycamore Studios. The associated studios intend to create tie-ins in various other mediums, including a graphic novel written by John Patrick Green, gaming, and location-based attractions.

== Main cast and characters ==
List indicators

This section includes characters who will appear or have appeared in the franchise in main roles.

- An empty grey cell indicates the character was not in the film, or that the character's official presence has not yet been confirmed.
- ^{V} indicates a voice-only role.
- ^{Y} indicates a younger version of the character.

Character	Original	Remake series					Reboot
Character	Doctor Dolittle	Dr. Dolittle	Dr. Dolittle 2	Dr. Dolittle 3	Dr. Dolittle: Tail to the Chief	Dr. Dolittle: Million Dollar Mutts	Dolittle
Character	1967	1998	2001	2006	2008	2009	2020
Principal cast
Dr. John Dolittle	Rex Harrison	Eddie Murphy Dari Gerard Smith^{Y} Raymond Matthew Mason^{Y}	Eddie Murphy				Robert Downey Jr.
Tommy Stubbins	William Dix						Harry Collett
Lisa Dolittle		Kristen Wilson	Kristen Wilson	Kristen Wilson	Karen Holness	Karen Holness	
Dr. Maya Dolittle		Kyla Pratt	Kyla Pratt	Kyla Pratt	Kyla Pratt	Kyla Pratt	
Charisse Dolittle		Raven-Symoné Pearman	Raven-Symoné Pearman				
Animal voice cast
Polynesia the macaw	Ginny Tyler^{V}						Emma Thompson^{V}
Chee-Chee the gorilla	Appeared						Rami Malek^{V}
Jip the lurcher	Appeared						Tom Holland^{V}
Lucky Dolittle the Border Terrier mix		Norm MacDonald^{V}	Norm MacDonald^{V}	Norm MacDonald^{V}	Norm MacDonald^{V}	Norm MacDonald^{V}	
Drunk Monkey the capuchin		Phil Proctor^{V}	Phil Proctor^{V}	Phil Proctor^{V}	Phil Proctor^{V}	Phil Proctor^{V}	
Rat No. 1		Reni Santoni^{V}	Reni Santoni^{V}				
Rat No. 2		John Leguizamo^{V}	John Leguizamo^{V}				
Jacob "Jake" the Bengal tiger		Albert Brooks^{V}					
Prologue dog		Ellen DeGeneres^{V}					
Compulsive Curly-haired Fox Terrier		Gilbert Gottfried^{V}					
Raccoon		Paul Reubens^{V}					
Rodney the guinea pig		Chris Rock^{V}					
Male pigeon		Garry Shandling^{V}					
Female pigeon		Julie Kavner^{V}					
German Shepherd		Tom Towles^{V}					
Pig		Hamilton Camp^{V}					
Tiger cub		Jonathan Lipnicki^{V}					
Skunk		Eddie Frierson^{V}					
Owl		Jenna Elfman^{V}					
Penguin		Kerrigan Mahan^{V}					
Old retriever		Brian Doyle-Murray^{V}					
Archie the "Pacific Western" bear			Steve Zahn^{V}				
Ava the "Pacific Western" bear			Lisa Kudrow^{V}				
Girl "Pacific Western" cub			Mandy Moore^{V}				
Boy "Pacific Western" cub			Frankie Muniz^{V}				
Pepito the Senegal chameleon			Jacob Vargas^{V}				
Sonny the Grizzly bear			Mike Epps^{V}				
Possum the opossum			Isaac Hayes^{V}				
Joey the raccoon			Michael Rapaport^{V}				
the Godbeaver			Richard C. Sarafian^{V}				
White wolf			Arnold Schwarzenegger^{V}				
Male tortoise			Tom Kenny^{V}				
Famale tortoise			Renée Taylor^{V}				
Mr. Lennie the weasel			Andy Dick^{V}				
Butch the Morgan horse				Gary Busey^{V}			
Hens				Vanessa Marshall^{V}			
Daisy the Cavalier King Charles Spaniel					Jennifer Coolidge^{V}		
Groundhog					Richard Kind^{V}		
Yellow-headed amazon parrot					Nolan North^{V}		
Emmy the Shetland Collie						Jaime Ray Newman^{V}	
Yoshi the polar bear							John Cena^{V}
Plimpton the ostrich							Kumail Nanjiani^{V}
Dab-Dab the American Pekin							Octavia Spencer^{V}
Kevin the tree squirrel							Craig Robinson^{V}
Barry the Bengal tiger							Ralph Fiennes^{V}
Betsy the giraffe							Selena Gomez^{V}
Tutu the French fox							Marion Cotillard^{V}
James the dragonfly							Jason Mantzoukas^{V}
Mini the sugar glider							Nick A. Fisher^{V}
Humphrey the Whale							Tim Treloar^{V}
Dragon							Frances de la Tour^{V}
Supporting cast
Emma Fairfax	Samantha Eggar Diana Lee						
Matthew Mugg	Anthony Newley						
Gen. Bellowes	Peter Bull						
Sarah Dolittle	Portia Nelson						
Archer Dolittle		Ossie Davis					
Dr. Mark Weller		Oliver Platt					
Dr. Gene "Geno" Reiss		Richard Schiff					
Mr. Calloway		Peter Boyle					
Dr. Fish		Jeffrey Tambor					
Dr. Sam Litvack		Steven Gilborn					
Steve Irwin the Crocodile Hunter			Himself				
Joey Potter			Jeffrey Jones				
Jack Reilly			Kevin Pollak				
Eric			Lil Zane				
Eugene Wilson			Andy Richter				
Jud				John Amos			
Bo				Walker Howard			
President of the United States of America Sterling					Peter Coyote		
Courtney Sterling					Elise Gatien		
COS Dorian					Malcolm Stewart		
Tiffany Monaco						Tegan Moss	
Brandon Booker						Brandon Jay McLaren	
Dr. Blair Müdfly							Michael Sheen
Rassouli							Antonio Banderas
Lord Thomas Badgley							Jim Broadbent
Lady Rose							Carmel Landiado
Queen Alexandrina Victoria							Jessie Buckley
Arnall Stubbins							Ralph Ineson
Lily Dolittle							Kasia Smutniak

== Additional crew and production details ==
Film	Crew/Detail					
Film	Composer	Cinematographer	Editor(s)	Production companies	Distributing company	Running time
Doctor Dolittle	Leslie Bricusse	Robert L. Surtees	Samuel E. Beetley; Marjorie Fowler	Twentieth Century Fox; Arthur P. Jacobs Productions	Twentieth Century Fox	2hrs 32mins
Dr. Dolittle	Richard Gibbs	Russell Boyd	Peter Teschner	Friendly Films; Davis Entertainment; Twentieth Century Fox; Joseph M. Singer Entertainment	Twentieth Century Fox	1hr 25mins
Dr. Dolittle 2	David Newman	Daryn Okada	Craig Herring	Friendly Films; Twentieth Century Fox; Davis Entertainment Company; Joseph M. Singer Entertainment	Twentieth Century Fox; Twentieth Century Fox Film Company	1hr 27mins
Dr. Dolittle 3	Christopher Lennertz	Eric J. Goldstein	Tony Lombardo	Davis Entertainment; DC3 Productions Ltd. Twentieth Century Fox; Major Studios Partners; 20th Century Fox Home Entertainment	20th Century Fox Home Entertainment	1hr 30mins
Dr. Dolittle: Tail of the Chief	Don Macdonald	Ron Stannett	Michael Trent	DD4C Productions; Davis Entertainment; 20th Century Fox Home Entertainment	20th Century Fox Home Entertainment	1hr 25mins
Dr. Dolittle: Million Dollar Mutts	Chris Hajian	Bert Dunk	Marshall Harvey	Dolittle 5 Productions; Dolittle 5 US Productions; Davis Entertainment; 20th Century Fox Home Entertainment	20th Century Fox Home Entertainment	1hr 23mins
Dolittle	Danny Elfman	Guillermo Navarro	Craig Alpert Chris Lebenzon	Team Downey; Universal Pictures; Perfect World Pictures Roth/Kirschenbaum Films	Universal Pictures	1hr 41mins

== Reception ==
=== Box office performance ===
Film	Box office gross			Box office ranking		Budget	Worldwide Net Income/Loss	Ref.
Film	North America	Other territories	Worldwide	All time North America	All time worldwide	Budget	Worldwide Net Income/Loss	Ref.
Doctor Dolittle	$9,000,000	—N/a	$9,000,000	#5,329	#7,472	$17,000,000	-$8,000,000	
Dr. Dolittle	$144,156,605	$150,300,000	$294,456,605	#406	#517	$71,500,000	$222,956,605	
Dr. Dolittle 2	$112,952,899	$63,151,445	$176,104,344	#619	#963	$72,000,000	$104,104,344	
Dr. Dolittle 3	—N/a	—N/a	$9,033,484 (Note: Figures are based only on home-video sales, as this film was released straight-to-video.)	—N/a	—N/a	$6,000,000	$3,033,484	
Dr. Dolittle: Tail to the Chief	—N/a	—N/a	$6,267,699	—N/a	—N/a	$6,000,000	$267,699	
Dr. Dolittle: Million Dollar Mutts	—N/a	—N/a	Information not available	—N/a	—N/a	$6,000,000	Information not available	
Dolittle	$77,047,065	$174,363,566	$251,410,631	#1,044	#619	$175,000,000	-$14,265,435	
Approximate Totals	~$343,156,569	~$387,815,011	~$730,971,580			~$353,500,000	~$377,471,580	

=== Critical and public response ===
Film	Rotten Tomatoes	Metacritic	CinemaScore
Doctor Dolittle	29% (21 reviews)	34/100 (6 reviews)	—N/a
Dr. Dolittle	42% (52 reviews)	46/100 (20 reviews)	A-
Dr. Dolittle 2	42% (107 reviews)	49/100 (28 reviews)	B+
Dr. Dolittle 3	—N/a	—N/a	—N/a
Dr. Dolittle: Tail to the Chief	—N/a	—N/a	—N/a
Dr. Dolittle: Million Dollar Mutts	—N/a	—N/a	—N/a
Dolittle	14% (227 reviews	26/100 (46 reviews)	B

== See also ==
- Doctor Dolittle (musical)
- Doctor Dolittle (TV series)
- Doolittle (album)
