= Timothy Reckart =

American film director

- Born: 1986 or 1987 (age 39–40); United States
- Occupations: Animator, film director
- Website: http://www.timreckart.com

Timothy Reckart Jr. is an American animator and director based in Los Angeles.

== Biography ==
Reckart grew up Catholic in Tucson, Arizona, where he attended University High School. He studied History and Literature at Harvard University where he graduated in 2009. He later attended the National Film and Television School in Beaconsfield, Buckinghamshire, UK, where he graduated in 2012 from the Directing Animation course. Reckart is best known for his 2012 film Head over Heels, nominated for the Academy Award for Best Animated Short Film in 2013. Reckart is currently based in Los Angeles where he also does work in multiplane collage animation, digital 2D animation, and pixilation. In 2017, he directed the Christian animated film based on the Nativity of Jesus, The Star, for Sony Pictures Animation.

By December 2019, he was set to direct the animated musical film High in the Clouds. In May 2026, Reckart was announced as the director of Doctor Dolittle: King of the Wild, an animated reimagining of the Dr. Dolittle franchise.

He is also the co-founder and chief creative officer of Sycamore Studios. His other projects in development at Sycamore Studios include animated film adaptations of Ludwig Bemelmans's Madeline and Ben Hatke's Zita the Spacegirl.

== Filmography ==
- Leftovers (2006, director, writer, editor, producer)
- Token Hunchback (2009, director, writer)
- Head over Heels (2012, director, writer, animator)
- Los Jarochos: A Sketch Show (2013, director, editor)
- Tumble Leaf (2015, animator)
- Anomalisa (2015, lead animator)
- Armikrog (2015, animator)
- Community (2015, animator)
- Panchagavya (2015, editor)
- Grand Opening (2016, director, writer)
- The Star (2017, director)
- Doctor Dolittle: King of the Wild (TBA, director)
