= Escape from Planet Earth =

2013 film by Cal Brunker

- Theatrical release poster
- Directed by: Cal Brunker
- Written by: Bob Barlen; Cal Brunker
- Based on: original story by: Tony Leech; Cory Edwards
- Produced by: Catherine Winder; Luke Carroll; Brian Inerfeld
- Starring: Rob Corddry; Brendan Fraser; Sarah Jessica Parker; William Shatner; Jessica Alba; Craig Robinson; George Lopez; Ricky Gervais; Jane Lynch; Sofia Vergara
- Cinematography: Matthew A. Ward
- Edited by: Matthew Landon; Scott Winlaw
- Music by: Aaron Zigman
- Production companies: The Weinstein Company; Rainmaker Entertainment
- Distributed by: Alliance Films (Canada); The Weinstein Company (United States)
- Release date: February 15, 2013; (United States)
- Running time: 89 minutes
- Countries: Canada; United States
- Language: English
- Budget: $40 million
- Box office: $74.6 million

Escape from Planet Earth is a 2013 animated science fiction comedy film, directed by Cal Brunker, written by Brunker and Bob Barlen, and featuring an ensemble voice cast, including Rob Corddry, Brendan Fraser, Sarah Jessica Parker, William Shatner, Jessica Alba, Craig Robinson, George Lopez, Ricky Gervais, Jane Lynch and Sofia Vergara. The film was released in the United States on February 15, 2013 to mostly negative reviews, but performed moderately well, grossing $74.6 million against a $40 million budget.

== Plot ==
On the planet Baab, reckless astronaut Scorch Supernova works at BASA (Baabian Aeronautics and Space Administration) with his smarter older brother Gary, who assists him on missions from BASA Headquarters. One day, Gary learns that Scorch will be sent to the "Dark Planet" (Earth) due to an SOS call and opposes the idea, knowing that any alien who goes to Earth never comes back. However, Scorch accepts without his approval. This leads to an argument between the brothers, causing Gary to quit his job out of frustration. Afterwards, Gary goes home and, along with his son Kip and wife Kira, watches Scorch's investigation on Earth via live TV.

Scorch arrives on Earth and finds a 7-Eleven convenience store, where he is ambushed by the US Army, led by General William Shanker, and is taken to Area 51. Witnessing the event, Kip wants to go rescue Scorch but Gary discourages him, upsetting Kip afterwards. That night, Gary heads to Kip's room to apologize, only to find that Kip is missing. He rushes to BASA with Kira and arrives in time to cancel a launch sequence at the last second and save Kip. Gary, having a change of heart and regretting quitting his job, re-activates the sequence, traveling to Earth to rescue Scorch himself. Gary arrives at the 7-Eleven and is captured by Shanker's men.

Shanker's girlfriend, BASA chief Lena Thackleman, has sent a reactor containing blubonium, a powerful source of energy, via Scorch's robotic suit. Gary is placed in a cell hall where he meets other captured aliens: the wisecracking Doc, the short-tempered Io, and the intelligent Thurman. The threesome tell Gary that various human technologies have been invented by them for Shanker to rip off and sell in exchange for their undetermined release from Area 51. Gary reunites with Scorch and tries to convince him to give him his job back but is again annoyed by his arrogance. Meanwhile, Lena captures Kira, who stayed at BASA and tried contacting Gary on his rescue mission, while revealing her plan to give Shanker a lifetime supply of blubonium.

The aliens are directed to the base's "peace shield", a massive laser weapon that obliterates nearby asteroids. Gary unintentionally provokes Scorch into stealing and breaking the reactor, for which Shanker places Scorch in a freezing chamber and orders Gary to fix the reactor for his brother's release. Gary fixes the ray, but Shanker goes back on his deal and freezes him as well. Shanker reveals that he plans to destroy all planets with life on them, stemming from an incident in which a trio of grey aliens accidentally killed his father. The other aliens discover Shanker's true intentions when he attempts to destroy Baab with the laser. Gary rigs the machine to malfunction, destroying itself and releasing Gary, Scorch, and the other aliens from prison. The brothers escape Area 51 and head for Baab after locating Scorch's spaceship.

Back on Baab, Kip frees Kira, who subdues Lena after the latter took off with a blubonium shipment and got a call from Shanker, who broke up with her. US Air Force jets chase Scorch's ship, but Kip guides him through and manages to evade and destroy the jets. Shanker, wearing Scorch's suit, uses a tractor beam to stop the ship in midair. Gary, followed by Scorch, jumps out and manages to get the suit off Shanker, which causes them all to plummet. While free-falling, Gary and Scorch reconcile before they and Shanker are rescued by the grey aliens, who helped Shanker due to their guilt of causing his father's fate but have now turned against him after discovering his true agenda. Gary punch outs Shanker, bids farewell to Doc, Io, and Thurman, and returns to Baab, where he and Scorch reunite with his family, while Lena is arrested. Scorch is greeted as a hero but gives Gary the credit, rehiring him to BASA. To celebrate his return to Baab, Scorch marries his girlfriend, anchorwoman Gabby Babblebrook, with Gary as his best man as a reward for saving him from Earth.

== Cast ==
- Rob Corddry as Gary Supernova, Scorch's nerdy older brother and Kip's father, who is also the head of mission control at BASA.
- Brendan Fraser as Scorch Supernova, an arrogant but benevolent space pilot, and Gary's big and strong younger brother who thinks he's the older one due to their different sizes.
- Craig Robinson as Doc, a wisecracking mouse-like alien who invented Social Networking Media.
- George Lopez as Thurman, an intelligent and kind three-eyed slug-like alien who invented Touchscreen technology.
- Jane Lynch as Io, a short-tempered giant cyclops-like alien from a Sun who has anger issues and invented the Search Engine.
- William Shatner as Gen. William T. Shanker, the villainous and xenophobic head of Area 51 and Lena's ex-boyfriend to whom he uses to get the source. James Gandolfini was originally cast to voice Shanker and was officially announced as part of the cast by The Weinstein Company in August 2011. However, Gandolfini quietly exited the project prior to its February 2013 release for unknown reasons and was replaced by William Shatner as revealed in the first trailer. While no official reason was given at the time, his The Sopranos co-stars Steve Schirripa and Michael Imperioli later revealed on The Joe Rogan Experience in June 2020 following Weinstein's fallout after his infamous scandal that Gandolfini had a major falling out with executive producer Harvey Weinstein in late 2012. Weinstein had aggressively pressured Gandolfini to promote another TWC film, Killing Them Softly on The Late Show with David Letterman, which many fans and observers have since pointed to as the likely reason Gandolfini walked away from the studio.
  - Joshua Rush as a young Shanker
- Sarah Jessica Parker as Kira Supernova, Gary's wife and Kip's mother, who worked 15 years at the BASA Academy as a test pilot.
- Jessica Alba as Lena Thackleman, BASA's no-nonsense chief and Shanker's ex-girlfriend.
- Jonathan Morgan Heit as Kip Supernova, Gary and Kira's son, and Scorch's nephew.
- Sofía Vergara as Gabby Babblebrook, an anchorwoman on Baab and Scorch's fiancé whom he marries in the end.
- Steve Zahn as Hawk, the owner of a 7-Eleven.
- Chris Parnell as Hammer, Hawk's friend and assistant.
- Ricky Gervais as Mr. James Bing, a talking computer who is programmed at BASA.
- Michael Dobson as Shanker's father
- Bill Hader as an Announcer (uncredited)

== Development ==
The film was in development at The Weinstein Company at least since 2007. The film was first announced in a press release from The Weinstein Company, which announced that the film was in full production and also announced most of the cast.

The film was directed by Cal Brunker, who previously worked as a storyboard artist on the films Despicable Me, Horton Hears a Who! and Ice Age: Continental Drift. The film was originally set for release in 2012, but was pushed back to February 15, 2013.

=== Lawsuit ===
Writer-director Tony Leech and film producer Brian Inerfeld sued The Weinstein Company, claiming they signed a deal whereby they were to receive at least 20 percent of Escape's adjusted gross profit, which they estimated would be worth close to $50 million in back end participation alone. But the film languished in development, and the plaintiffs claimed that the Weinsteins repeatedly unlocked the script, forcing rewrites at least 17 times, which they say "eviscerated" the movie's budget by keeping 200-plus animators on payroll. With the film pushing its budget, the Weinsteins went outside for fresh capital.

The Weinstein Company entered into a Funding and Security Agreement with JTM whereby the financiers agreed to provide new money and, in return, get 25 percent of the film's gross receipts and 100 percent of all foreign gross receipts. Leech and Inerfeld were upset, alleging that the agreement had mortgaged their own financial upside and said the Weinsteins advised them that if they wanted their past due money, they would have to agree to this arrangement. Instead, Leech and Inerfeld went on the legal attack against TWC even claiming that they were paid $500,000 in hush money to keep the dispute quiet on the verge of the Weinsteins' The King's Speech Oscar victory in 2011. As for JTM, the plaintiffs demanded a declaratory judgment that their contractual rights to share in the profits were superior to JTM's security interest in profits from the film.

On February 15, 2013, the same day the film was released, in a document filed in the New York Supreme Court, lawyers for both sides filed a motion of discontinuance in the case, effectively ending it. No details of the settlement were made available but because the motion was filed "with prejudice" both sides would be paying their own legal costs.

== Music ==
Escape from Planet Earth: Original Motion Picture Soundtrack, the soundtrack of the film was released on February 19, 2013.

Escape from Planet Earth: Original Score By Aaron Zigman, the soundtrack of the film was scored by Aaron Zigman and performed by the Brussels Philharmonic Orchestra. It was released on February 8, 2013.

== Release ==
=== Critical response ===
On the review aggregator website Rotten Tomatoes, 35% of 43 critics' reviews are positive, with an average rating of 4.62/10. Metacritic, which uses a weighted average, assigned the film a score of 35 out of 100, based on 11 critics, indicating "generally unfavorable" reviews. Audiences polled by CinemaScore gave the film an average grade of "B+" on an A+ to F scale.

Stephen Farber of The Hollywood Reporter gave the film a positive review, saying, "The picture has enough entertainment value to tickle its target audience and even offers a few chuckles for accompanying adults. A strong cast and bright – if uninspired – animation help to offset a thin story. Decent box office returns seem likely." Tasha Robinson of The A.V. Club gave the film a C, calling it a "Mild-mannered 3D animated film that consists largely of broad conflicts, broadly resolved. It's unchallenging fun for a younger crowd, but adults might feel like they're staring down a colorful 24-piece board puzzle, trying to figure out how such a simple activity could be drawn out over 90 minutes." Mack Rawden of Cinema Blend gave the film one star out of five, saying, "Every single facet of the film is at best, slightly below average and at worst, downright terrible." Stephen Whitty of the Newark Star-Ledger gave the film two and a half stars out of four, saying, "It provides a few smiles, and a decent amount of rainy-day, kiddie entertainment." Neil Genzlinger of The New York Times gave the film two and a half stars out of five, saying, "A children's movie about space-traveling blue beings that has lots of high-flying escapades but fairly low aspirations."

Jordan Riefe of the Boston Phoenix gave the film two out of four stars, saying, "This might please young kids but torment discerning parents." Michael O'Sullivan of The Washington Post gave the film two out of four stars, saying, "Just like its hero and his grounded starship, Escape From Planet Earth is, for much of the film, a decidedly earthbound adventure." Vadim Rizov of Time Out gave the film two out of five stars, saying, "The late Douglas Adams summed up Earth as "mostly harmless," a description that also applies to this eminently tolerable animated time-filler." Gregg Turkington of On Cinema gave the film five bags of popcorn, the highest possible score on the program. He however, described the decision to not include Brendan Fraser in the film itself as a mistake, stating "If you'd actually filmed him rather than animate him I think it would have been more enjoyable."

Alonso Duralde of The Wrap gave the film a negative review, saying, "It's a bowl of warm water into which no one has bothered to place a bouillon cube. The kids in the theater with me never mustered a single laugh or gasp of excitement. It's plenty o' nuttin'." Peter Howell of the Toronto Star gave the film two and a half stars out of four, saying, "No matter whether you call Escape from Planet Earth sincere homage or cynical thievery, it goes down well in its brisk 89 minutes." Gregg Katzman of IGN gave the film a 4.5 out of 10, saying, "Escape From Planet Earth looks fantastic and is sporting some commendable voice acting, but these qualities can't overcome a stale script and significant lack of laughs. Unless you have a young kid that wants to see it, I just can't recommend this one at all." Sheri Linden of the Los Angeles Times gave the film three out of five stars, saying, "It never discovers new worlds, but "Escape From Planet Earth is, in its genial way, escape enough."

Tom Russo of The Boston Globe gave the film two stars out of four, saying, "If "Escape" figures prominently into your February staycation plans, you won't feel like you've thrown your money away, but the kids won't still be buzzing about it when they get back to school, either." Roger Moore of The Seattle Times gave the film two out of four stars, saying, "The animation is what sells Escape from Planet Earth, with rich, textured surfaces – check out the fishnet webbing on Scorch's spacesuit, the paint worn off the hardware and the perfectly rendered 7-Eleven, where even the Slurpee (product placement in a cartoon?) shimmers like the real thing. But it's not worth paying 3D prices". Joe Leydon of Variety gave the film a positive review, saying, "A lightweight, warp-speed, brightly colored trifle that should delight small children and sporadically amuse their parents."

=== Box office ===
Escape from Planet Earth grossed $57,012,977 in North America, and $17,584,666 in other countries, for a worldwide total of $74,597,643. In North America, the film opened to number four in its first weekend with $15,891,055, behind A Good Day to Die Hard, Identity Thief and Safe Haven. In its second weekend, the film went up to number three grossing an additional $10,682,037. In its third weekend, the film dropped to number six grossing $6,619,827. In its fourth weekend, the film dropped to number nine grossing $3,218,923.

=== Home media ===
Escape from Planet Earth was released on DVD, Blu-ray and Blu-ray 3D on June 4, 2013, by Anchor Bay Entertainment.
