= Sycamore Studios =

American independent animation studio

- Type: Private
- Industry: Animation
- Founded: August 27, 2024; 2 years ago
- Founder: Christian McGuigan; Timothy Reckart
- Headquarters: Los Angeles, California U.S
- Key people: Christian McGuigan (CEO); Timothy Reckart (CCO)
- Website: sycamorestudios.com

Sycamore Studios is an American animation studio based on Los Angeles, California, founded in 2024 by Christian McGuigan and Timothy Reckart.

== History ==
It was announced the company hired Cooper Waterman as Head of Production and distribution.

== Filmography ==
Year	Title	Director	Distributor	Notes
TBA	Doctor Dolittle: King of the Wild	Timothy Reckart	TBA	Co-production with Reel FX Animation
TBA	Untited Madeline film	TBA	TBA	
TBA	Untitled InvestiGators film	TBA	TBA	
TBA	Zita the Spacegirl	TBA	TBA	Co-production with Latcham Pictures
