= List of works by Ramin Djawadi =

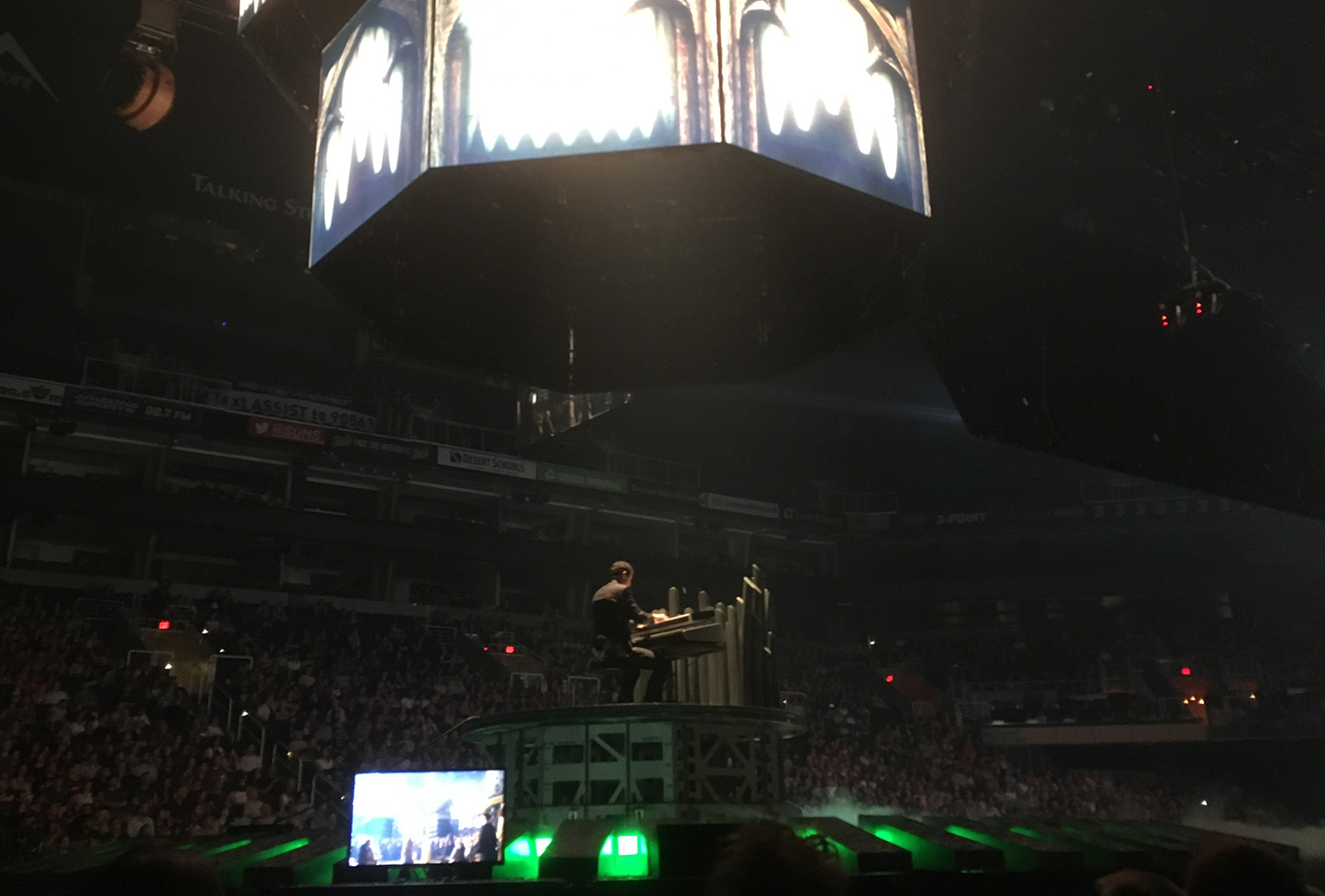
Djawadi performing in 2017

This is the list of works of Iranian-German composer and music producer Ramin Djawadi. Djawadi has composed and produced over one hundred soundtracks and film scores for both film and TV. He is best known for the score of HBO's series, Game of Thrones, along with other shows like Prison Break, Person of Interest, Westworld, Fallout. He is also known for movie scores like Pacific Rim, Iron Man, and Warcraft, Eternals, The Great Wall.

Djawadi won two Emmy Awards in the category Outstanding Music Composition for a Series for his work on the soundtracks of season 7 and season 8 of Game of Thrones in 2018 and 2019. He won an Annie Award for Best Music - TV/Media at the 53rd Annie Awards alongside Shane Eli and Jonny Pakfar in 2026. He was also nominated for Grammy Awards in 2009, 2018, and 2020. He was honored with BMI Icon Award at the 40th BMI Film, TV and Visual Media Awards in 2024.

== Songs written for visual media ==
Djawadi wrote "The Rains of Castamere" which was performed by The National, Sigor Ros and Serj Tankian over the course of eight seasons of Game of Thrones. For the third season of Game of Thrones, Djawadi wrote the song "The Bear and the Maiden Fair" sung by The Hold Steady in the episode of the same name.

He worked alongside Ellie Goulding for her song "Hollow Crown" in the album For the Throne: Music Inspired by the HBO Series Game of Thrones.

For the eighth and final season of Game of Thrones, Djawadi co-wrote the song "Jenny of Oldstones" sung by Florence Welch of Florence and the Machine . A version of the song was sung by actor Daniel Portman on the show in the second episode of season 8 "A Knight of the Seven Kingdoms" joining the vast compositions from Game of Thrones Universe.

Djawadi wrote the score for Pixar's Win or Lose, with the duo, CAMPFIRE writing original songs based on Djawadi's themes for the show.

== Films ==
=== 2000s ===
Year	Title	Director(s)	Studio(s)	Notes
2001	Shoo Fly	Sajit Warrier	—N/a	Short film
2001	Exit Wounds	Andrzej Bartkowiak	Village Roadshow Pictures; Silver Pictures	Uncredited, additional music Score composed by Dame Grease and Jeff Rona
2002	Teknolust	Lynn Hershman Leeson	ThinkFilm	With Klaus Badelt
2002	The Time Machine	Simon Wells	Parkes/MacDonald Productions	Additional music arrangement Score composed by Klaus Badelt
2002	K-19: The Widowmaker	Kathryn Bigelow	Intermedia Films; National Geographic Society; New Regency Pictures	Additional music arrangement Score composed by Klaus Badelt
2002	Equilibrium	Kurt Wimmer	Dimension Films; Blue Tulip Productions	Additional music arrangement Score composed by Klaus Badelt
2003	Beat the Drum	David Hickson	Z Productions	With Klaus Badelt
2003	The Recruit	Roger Donaldson	Touchstone Pictures; Spyglass Entertainment	Additional music Score composed by Klaus Badelt
2003	Ned Kelly	Gregor Jordan	StudioCanal; Working Title Films; Australian Film Commission; Film Finance Corporation Australia; The Woss Group; Endymion Films	Additional music Score composed by Klaus Badelt
2003	Basic	John McTiernan	Phoenix Pictures; Intermedia Films	Additional music Score composed by Klaus Badelt
2003	Manfast	Tara Judelle	—N/a	Additional music Score composed by Klaus Badelt
2003	Pirates of the Caribbean: The Curse of the Black Pearl	Gore Verbinski	Walt Disney Pictures; Jerry Bruckheimer Films	Additional music Score composed by Klaus Badelt and Hans Zimmer
2003	Something's Gotta Give	Nancy Meyers	Columbia Pictures; Warner Bros.	Additional music Score composed by Hans Zimmer
2003	National Security	Dennis Dugan	Columbia Pictures; DreamWorks Pictures; Castle Rock Entertainment	Additional music Score composed by Randy Edelman
2004	Thunderbirds	Jonathan Frakes	Universal Pictures	Additional music Score composed by Hans Zimmer
2004	Blade: Trinity	David S. Goyer	New Line Cinema	With The RZA
2005	Son of the Mask	Lawrence Guterman	Radar Pictures; Dark Horse Entertainment; Gang of Seven Animation	Additional music Score composed by Randy Edelman
2005	Batman Begins	Christopher Nolan	DC Comics; Syncopy; Patalex III Productions; Legendary Pictures	Additional music Score composed by Hans Zimmer and James Newton Howard
2005	The Island	Michael Bay	DreamWorks Pictures; Warner Bros. Pictures	Additional music Score composed by Steve Jablonsky
2005	All the Invisible Children	Jordan Scott; Ridley Scott	01 Distribution	Anthology film – Jonathan (Short film)
2005	Tom-Yum-Goong	Prachya Pinkaew	Baa-ram-ewe	Additional music Score composed by Howard Drossin
2006	Ask the Dust	Robert Towne	Paramount Classics	With Heitor Pereira
2006	Open Season	Roger Allers; Jill Culton	Columbia Pictures; Sony Pictures Animation	First score for an animated film
2006	Boog and Elliot's Midnight Bun Run	Jill Culton; Anthony Stacchi	Columbia Pictures; Sony Pictures Animation	Short film Composed with Paul Westerberg
2007	Mr. Brooks	Bruce A. Evans	Metro-Goldwyn-Mayer	—N/a
2007	Shortcut to Happiness	Alec Baldwin	Emmett/Furla Oasis	Additional music (song:"Lost Souls theme"); Score composed by Christopher Young
2007	The ChubbChubbs Save Xmas	Cody Cameron	Columbia Pictures; Sony Pictures Animation	Short film
2008	Fly Me to the Moon	Ben Stassen	Summit Entertainment; NWave Pictures; Illuminata Pictures	—N/a
2008	Deception	Marcel Langenegger	20th Century Fox	—N/a
2008	Iron Man	Jon Favreau	Paramount Pictures; Marvel Studios	Soundtrack released by Lionsgate; Score produced with Hans Zimmer
2008	Open Season 2	Matthew O'Callaghan; Todd Wilderman	Sony Pictures Home Entertainment; Sony Pictures Animation	Direct-to-video film
2009	The Unborn	David S. Goyer	Universal Pictures; Rogue Pictures	Soundtrack released by Lakeshore Records
2009	Medal of Honor	Călin Peter Netzer	HI Film Productions	Original Romanian title: Medalia de onoare

=== 2010s ===
Year	Title	Director(s)	Studio(s)	Notes
2010	Clash of the Titans	Louis Leterrier	Warner Bros. Pictures; Legendary Pictures	Soundtrack released by WaterTower Music
2010	A Turtle's Tale: Sammy's Adventures	Ben Stassen	StudioCanal; NWave Pictures; Illuminata Pictures	—N/a
2011	Fright Night	Craig Gillespie	Touchstone Pictures; DreamWorks Pictures	—N/a
2012	Safe House	Daniel Espinosa	Universal Pictures	—N/a
2012	A Turtle's Tale 2: Sammy's Escape from Paradise	Ben Stassen; Vincent Kesteloot	StudioCanal; NWave Pictures; Illuminata Pictures	—N/a
2012	Red Dawn	Dan Bradley	FilmDistrict; Metro-Goldwyn-Mayer; United Artists	—N/a
2013	Pacific Rim	Guillermo del Toro	Warner Bros. Pictures; Legendary Pictures	Soundtrack released by WaterTower Music
2013	African Safari	Ben Stassen	StudioCanal; NWave Pictures	—N/a
2013	The House of Magic	Ben Stassen; Jeremy Degruson	StudioCanal; NWave Pictures	—N/a
2014	Dracula Untold	Gary Shore	Universal Pictures; Legendary Pictures	Soundtrack released by Back Lot Music
2016	Robinson Crusoe	Vincent Kesteloot; Ben Stassen	StudioCanal; NWave Pictures	—N/a
2016	Warcraft	Duncan Jones	Universal Pictures; Legendary Pictures	Soundtrack released by Back Lot Music
2017	The Great Wall	Zhang Yimou	Universal Pictures; Legendary Pictures	Soundtrack released by Milan Entertainment
2017	The Mountain Between Us	Hany Abu-Assad	20th Century Fox	—N/a
2018	A Wrinkle in Time	Ava DuVernay	Walt Disney Pictures; Whitaker Entertainment	Soundtrack released by Walt Disney Records
2018	Slender Man	Sylvain White	Screen Gems	—N/a
2019	The Queen's Corgi	Ben Stassen	NWave Pictures	

=== 2020s ===
Year	Title	Director(s)	Studio(s)	Notes
2020	Elephant	Mark Linfield	Disney+ Disneynature	Soundtrack released by Walt Disney Records
2021	The Ravine	Keoni Waxman	Apple TV+ Amazon; Google VOD; Hope Messenger Media; Hollywood Media Group	—N/a
2021	Reminiscence	Lisa Joy	Michael De Luca Productions; Kilter films Warner Bros. Pictures; FilmNation Entertainment	Soundtrack released by WaterTower Music
2021	Eternals	Chloé Zhao	Marvel Studios; Walt Disney Studios Motion Pictures	Soundtrack released by Marvel Music & Hollywood Records
2022	Uncharted	Ruben Fleischer	Columbia Pictures; PlayStation Productions; Atlas Entertainment; Arad Productions	Soundtrack released by Sony Classical
2022	Metal Lords	Peter Sollett	Netflix	—N/a
2022	The Man from Toronto	Patrick Hughes	Netflix; Sony Pictures; Escape Artists; Bron Creative; Sony Pictures Releasing	Soundtrack released by Sony Classical
2022	Night of the Cooters	Vincent D'Onofrio	Trioscope Studios	
2024	Howard Waldrop's Mary Margaret Road-Grader	Steven Paul Judd		
2026	Mercy	Timur Bekmambetov	Amazon MGM Studios; Metro-Goldwyn-Mayer; Atlas Entertainment; Bazelevs Company	
2026	Jack Ryan: Ghost War	Andrew Bernstein	Amazon MGM Studios; Paramount Pictures; Skydance Media; Genre Arts; Sunday Night Productions; Push Boot.	Co-composed with William Marriott

== Television ==
=== Television films ===
Year	Title	Director(s)	Channel	Notes
2003	Saving Jessica Lynch	Peter Markle	NBC	—N/a
2005	Buffalo Dreams	David Jackson	Disney Channel	—N/a
2005	Faith of My Fathers	Peter Markle	A&E	score only (theme by Velton Ray Bunch)
2009	Prison Break: The Final Break	Part 1: Nick Santora; Seth Hoffman; Part 2: Zack Estrin; Karyn Usher	Fox	—N/a

=== Television series ===
Year	Title	Episode(s)	Channel	Notes
2004	The Grid	6	TNT	—N/a
2005	Threshold	"Revelations"	CBS	—N/a
2005–09, 2017	Prison Break	90	Fox	Soundtracks released by Varèse Sarabande
2006	Blade: The Series	13	Spike	—N/a
2009–2010	FlashForward	22	ABC	Outstanding Music Composition for a Series (Original Dramatic Score) Nominated
2011–2012	Breakout Kings	23	A&E	—N/a
2011–2019	Game of Thrones	73	HBO	Soundtracks released by Varèse Sarabande and WaterTower Music
2011–2016	Person of Interest	103	CBS	Soundtracks released by Varèse Sarabande
2014–2017	The Strain	46	FX	—N/a
2016–2022	Westworld	36	HBO	Soundtrack released by WaterTower Music
2018–2023	Jack Ryan	24	Amazon Prime Video	Soundtrack released by La-La-Land Records
2020	Amazing Stories	1	Apple TV+	Episode "The Heat"; Co–composed with Brandon Campbell
2022–present	House of the Dragon	18	HBO	Soundtrack released by WaterTower Music
2023–2024	Beacon 23	8	MGM+	"Main Title theme" Score by William Marriott
2024–present	3 Body Problem	8	Netflix	Based on the Chinese novel The Three-Body Problem by Liu Cixin
2024–present	Fallout	8	Amazon Prime Video	Inspired by Inon Zur
2025	Win or Lose	8	Disney+	Score by Djawadi Original songs written by CAMPFIRE based on Djawadi's themes. Soundtrack released by Walt Disney Records
2025	Death by Lightning	4	Netflix	Soundtrack released by Netflix Music

== Video games ==
Year	Title	Developer(s)	Notes
1999	System Shock 2	Irrational Games; Looking Glass Studios	Composed with Josh Randall and Eric Brosius; Credited as Audio Technician
2000	Thief II	Looking Glass Studios	Composed with Eric Brosius; Credited as Audio Technician
2010	Medal of Honor	Danger Close Games (singleplayer); EA Digital Illusions CE (multiplayer)	—N/a
2011	Shift 2: Unleashed	Slightly Mad Studios	Composed with: Heavy Melody Music; Troels Folmann; Stephen Baysted; Mick Gordon; Mike Reagan
2012	Medal of Honor: Warfighter	Danger Close Games	—N/a
2014–2015	Game of Thrones	Telltale Games	Additional music Score composed by Jared Emerson-Johnson
2016	Gears of War 4	The Coalition	Additional music by Brandon Campbell
2019	Gears 5	The Coalition	Additional music by Brandon Campbell
2020	Gears 5: Hivebusters	The Coalition	Additional music by Brandon Campbell
2021	New World	Amazon Games	Co-composed with Brandon Campbell
2022	The Diofield Chronicle	Square Enix; Lancarse Ltd.	Co-composed with Brandon Campbell
2022	New World: Blood of the Sands	Amazon Games	Co-composed with Brandon Campbell
2023	Honor of Kings	TiMi Studio Group	Concept theme music 'Wonders of Navenia' and 'Voyage'

== Concert tours ==
Year	Title	Duration	Shows
2017–2019,2023	Game of Thrones Live Concert Experience	20 February 2017 – 5 October 2019 (North America and Europe)	70
Game of Thrones Live Concert Experience, Djawadi's debut concert tour, taking music from the soundtrack of Game of Thrones Season 1–8.

== Awards ==
Year	Recipient	Award	Category	Notes	Result	References
2006	Prison Break	58th Primetime Creative Arts Emmy Awards	Outstanding Original Main Title Theme Music		Nominated	
2006	Batman Begins	ASCAP Awards	Top Box Office Films	Shared with: James Newton Howard and Hans Zimmer	Won	
2007	Mr. Brooks	World Soundtrack Awards	Discovery of the Year		Nominated	
2007	Open Season	ASCAP Awards	Top Box Office Films	Shared with: Paul Westerberg	Won	
2009	Iron Man	35th Saturn Awards	Best Score		Nominated	
2009	Iron Man	51st Annual Grammy Awards	Best Score Soundtrack for Motion Picture, Television or Other Visual Media		Nominated	
2009	Iron Man	ASCAP Awards	Top Box Office Films		Won	
2010	FlashForward	62nd Primetime Creative Arts Emmy Awards	Outstanding Music Composition for a Series	Episode: "No More Good Days"	Nominated	
2011	Game of Thrones	International Film Music Critics Association	Best Original Score for a Television Series		Nominated	
2011	Clash of the Titans	ASCAP Awards	Top Box Office Films		Won	
2012	Game of Thrones	ASCAP Awards	Top Television Series		Won	
2013	Game of Thrones	ASCAP Awards	Top Television Series		Won	
2013	Person of Interest	ASCAP Awards	Top Television Series	Shared with: J. J. Abrams	Won	
2013	Safe House	ASCAP Awards	Top Box Office Films		Won	
2013	Game of Thrones	International Film Music Critics Association	Best Original Score for a Television Series		Nominated	
2014	Game of Thrones	66th Primetime Creative Arts Emmy Awards	Outstanding Music Composition For A Series	Episode: "The Mountain and the Viper"	Nominated	
2014	Game of Thrones	Hollywood Music in Media Awards	Best Original Score—TV Show/Digital Streaming Series		Nominated	
2016	Game of Thrones	World Soundtrack Awards	Television Composer of the Year	Also for: Person of Interest, The Strain and Westworld	Nominated	
2016	Game of Thrones	International Film Music Critics Association	Best Original Score for a Television Series		Won	
2016	Westworld	International Film Music Critics Association	Best Original Score for a Television Series		Nominated	
2016	Game of Thrones	International Film Music Critics Association	Film Music Composition of the Year	"Light of the Seven"	Nominated	
2017	Westworld	69th Primetime Creative Arts Emmy Awards	Outstanding Original Main Title Theme Music		Nominated	
2018	Game of Thrones	60th Annual Grammy Awards	Best Score Soundtrack For Visual Media		Nominated	
2018	Game of Thrones	World Soundtrack Awards	Best Television Composer of the Year	Also for: The Strain (season 4) and Westworld (season 2)	Won	
2018	Game of Thrones	70th Primetime Creative Arts Emmy Awards	Outstanding Music Composition For A Series	Episode: "The Dragon and the Wolf"	Won	
2018	Westworld	70th Primetime Creative Arts Emmy Awards	Outstanding Music Composition For A Series	Episode: "Akane no Mai"	Nominated	
2019	Game of Thrones	71st Primetime Creative Arts Emmy Awards	Outstanding Music Composition For A Series	Episode: "The Long Night"	Won	
2019	Game of Thrones	World Soundtrack Awards	Best Television Composer of the Year	Also for: Jack Ryan (season 1)	Nominated	
2020	Game of Thrones	62nd Annual Grammy Awards	Best Score Soundtrack For Visual Media	Game of Thrones: Season 8	Nominated	
2024	40th Annual BMI Film, TV and Visual Media Awards		BMI Icon Award		Won	
2025	Win Or Lose	53rd Annie Awards	Best Music – TV/Media	Episode: "Mixed Signals"; Shared with Shane Eli and Johnny Pakfar	Won	
