= The Queen's Corgi =

2019 film by Ben Stassen

- Theatrical release poster
- Directed by: Ben Stassen; Vincent Kesteloot
- Written by: John R. Smith; Rob Sprackling
- Produced by: Ben Stassen
- Starring: Jack Whitehall; Ray Winstone; Sheridan Smith; Matt Lucas; Tom Courtenay; Julie Walters
- Edited by: Vincent Kesteloot
- Music by: Ramin Djawadi
- Production companies: nWave Pictures; Belga Productions
- Distributed by: Belga Films
- Release dates: 16 January 2019 (L'Alpe d'Huez); 3 April 2019 (Belgium)
- Running time: 85 minutes
- Country: Belgium
- Language: English
- Budget: $20 million
- Box office: $31.4 million

The Queen's Corgi is a 2019 Belgian animated comedy film produced by nWave Pictures. The film was directed by Ben Stassen and Vincent Kesteloot and written by John R. Smith and Rob Sprackling. Inspired by Queen Elizabeth II and her pet corgis, the story follows a corgi named Rex, who gets lost and tries to find his way home.

The film was theatrically released in Belgium on 3 April 2019. The film was panned by critics, and was a box-office failure, grossing $31.4 million worldwide against a budget of $20 million.

== Plot ==
Rex is Queen Elizabeth II's favourite corgi and lives a life of luxury with three other corgis in Buckingham Palace. On a visit by U.S. president Donald Trump with his wife Melania and their fictiona dog, Mitzi. The Queen suggests one of her corgis might be a suitable mate for Mitzi, who chooses Rex, who is not pleased at the prospect. After Rex evades her multiple times, Mitzi chases him into the dining hall where he accidentally bites Trump, angering the Queen as she scolds Rex.

Rex, ashamed at embarrassing the Queen, who is feeling guilty at what happened, is consoled by Charlie, another of the Queen's corgis who is jealous of Rex's position. Luring him with the false promise that the Pope is looking for dogs, Charlie disposes of Rex's collar and leads him to a stream with the intention of drowning him.

Rex is saved by a man who takes him to a dog shelter, where Rex's mannerisms at first alienate him, but he makes friends and falls in love with a young Saluki named Wanda. Initially wary, she develops feelings for him. This raises the ire of Tyson, a former fighting dog, who also has feelings for Wanda and runs the kennel. Rex convinces the other dogs to join forces against Tyson and defeat him.

Rex returns to the palace with his new friends and Wanda, however the guards do not recognise him and throw him out of the palace as Charlie has convinced the Queen that Rex was killed by foxes. Rex sneaks into the palace where everybody tries to prevent Charlie from becoming top dog. Charlie traps Rex and Wanda in a room and sets it on fire. Wanda escapes and rallies their friends to save Rex.

The Queen is overjoyed to find Rex alive and well and is about to restore to him the honour of Top Dog. Rex refuses as he values his love for Wanda more than his position. Charlie, becoming Top Dog, is forced to become mates with Mitzi and move to America while Rex continues to live at the palace with his new friends.

== Cast ==
Character	Voice actor	
Character	United Kingdom	United States
Rex	Jack Whitehall	Leo Barakat
Wanda	Sheridan Smith	Jo Wyatt
Tyson	Ray Winstone	Joey Camen
Charlie	Matt Lucas	Dino Andrade
Queen Elizabeth II	Julie Walters	Mari Devon (credited as Jane Alan)
Prince Philip	Tom Courtenay	Paul Gregory
Nelson	Colin McFarlane	Anthony Skordi
Lady Margaret	Debra Stephenson	Lin Gallagher
Jack	Iain McKee	Rusty Shackleford
Al Sation	Steven Kynman	Joey Camen
Bernard St. Bernard	Jon Culshaw	Jamie Arlen Scott
Chihuahua	Rasmus Hardiker	Joey Camen
Chief	Colin McFarlane	Rick Zieff (credited as Danny Katiana)
Sanjay	Kulvinder Ghir	Joey Camen
Ginger	Rasmus Hardiker	Lani Minella
Polux	Steven Kynman	Dino Andrade
Patmore	Nina Wadia	Lin Gallagher
Mitzi	Sarah Hadland	Madison Brown
Melania Trump	Debra Stephenson	Millie Mup
President Donald Trump	Jon Culshaw	Kirk Thornton (credited as Ron Allen)

== Production ==
The Belgian company nWave Pictures produced and animated the film, with the distribution company Charades acquiring worldwide rights to it.

The film cost around $20 million to make.

=== Music ===
Ramin Djawadi, who scored Ben Stassen's previous films, such as Robinson Crusoe, The House of Magic and Fly Me to the Moon, returned to score the film. This is the seventh collaboration between Stassen and Djawadi.

== Release ==
This film was released on 3 April 2019 in France and Belgium. It was also released in 2020 in other countries around the world, including China, the United Kingdom, Latin America, the United States and Russia.

== Reception ==
On the review aggregator website Rotten Tomatoes, 0% of 20 critics' reviews are positive, with an average rating of 3.6/10.

Clarisse Loughrey of The Independent gave the film 1/5 stars, calling it "deeply unpleasant and in no way suitable for children." Mike McCahill of The Guardian gave it 2/5 stars, writing, "Kesteloot and Stassen are too busy scrabbling for content – basically fine, largely indifferent, sometimes misjudged – to fill the gaps between the frenetic set pieces." The Canberra Times's Cris Kennedy also gave it 2/5 stars, criticising it as "an appalling exercise in misjudgment" and adding, "The adult concepts are out there in the open: death, nymphomania, gay and transgender shaming, domestic violence. And that's from the puppy dogs our kids are supposed to find cute."

Nathan Rabin wrote in a review for Fatherly, "It's as if the screenwriters wrote a hard R, Sausage Party-style lowbrow romp and a G-rated movie about cute doggies, then combined the two scripts into something that was wildly inappropriate for families but too cute and cloying for adults. Nobody should watch this with their kids if they watch it at all."

== See also ==
- List of films with a 0% rating on Rotten Tomatoes
