= Alien Adventure =

- DVD cover
- Directed by: Ben Stassen
- Written by: Ben Stassen
- Produced by: Charlotte Clay Huggins; Caroline Van Iseghem
- Starring: Bouli Lanners; Pierre Lebecque
- Narrated by: John Boyle
- Cinematography: Ben Stassen
- Edited by: Ed Escalante; James Manke; Todd Portugal
- Music by: The Puzzlers; Louis Vyncke
- Production companies: Iwerks Entertainment; Movida-Trix nWave Pictures
- Distributed by: nWave Pictures; Ventura Distribution (DVD)
- Release date: July 1, 2000 (Japan)
- Running time: 37 minutes (Japan); 35 minutes (U.S.)
- Countries: Belgium; United States
- Language: English

Alien Adventure is a science fiction/slapstick comedy 3D film in IMAX format released in 1999 by nWave Pictures, written and directed by Ben Stassen. The movie was rated G (or the local equivalent) in most countries. It was the first fully digital feature-length film produced for a large-screen format.

== Plot ==
An extraterrestrial humanoid species, the Glegoliths, are wandering through space in search of a new world. Encountering an unknown planet (which turns out to be Earth), the Glegolith leader Cyrillus sends two "manned" probes to the surface to determine if it is suitable for colonisation.

The scouts in the probes think they have arrived at a great city, but in fact they have arrived at a new amusement park that is not yet open to the public. They proceed to explore four amusement rides : (Note: all of which having been previously released as separate shorts)

- Arctic Adventure (motion simulator ride in a freezing environment);
- Magic Carpet (a ride in an Arabian Nights-themed dungeon);
- Kid Coaster (a roller coaster set in a gigantic simulation of a child's bedroom); and
- Aqua Adventure (an underwater-themed motion simulator ride, complete with animatronic sharks).

At each ride the Glegolith scouts become variously excited, frightened, frozen or violently ill, but end up having a lot of fun. On seeing this, Cyrillus decides that the new planet "was too much fun" and would destroy the fabric of his society, and orders his scouts to withdraw. The alien visitors depart Earth without actually making contact with humans.

== Production notes ==
The exotic looking alien script seen in several places in this movie is actually the real Glagolitic alphabet. The name of the alien leader - Cyrillus - bears a resemblance to Saint Cyril, who invented the Glagolitic alphabet. Also, the language spoken by the aliens (which is never translated in the movie) is the Walloon language, a real dialect from Belgium, where the movie was produced. It is completely unrelated to the Glegolithic script. On the approach of the manned probes to the surface, the coastline appears to be that of California. The outdoor shots of the theme park are from a real French theme park, "Parc Du Futuroscope".

== Reception ==
Robert Koehler of Variety called it "a sputtering vehicle for showcasing the Imax 3D format."

== Home media ==
It was released on DVD in the US slingshot Home Entertainment and the UK Escapi x.c.q DVD.

== See also ==
- Haunted Castle
- List of 3D films (1914–2004)
