= Lunascape (band) =

Lunascape was a Belgian trip hop band founded in the mid-1990s by Kyoko Baertsoen and Walter Hilhorst. The group was initially formed under the name Calyx, but changed it to avoid confusion with a London drum and bass group by the same name.

Baertsoen and Hilhorst originally met at the television and film academy in Brussels in 1993, and began working on small-scale musical projects at that time, but their collaboration was interrupted in 1997 when Baertsoen joined the group Hooverphonic and toured Europe with them. On her return she resumed working with Hilhorst on the project that would become Lunascape. Their first two albums, Reflecting Seyelence and Mindstalking, were released only in Europe, but in 2005, their first North American release, Reminiscence, from Dancing Ferret Discs's Noir label, combined tracks from both the previous albums, bringing their music to a new audience. Tracks from Reflecting Seyelence were used in the IMAX 3D movie Haunted Castle.

Citing influences ranging from goth pioneers The Sisters of Mercy and Bauhaus to psychedelic acts like Pink Floyd to the ethereal pop of the Cocteau Twins, Lunascape create lush, moody soundscapes, dominated by Baertsoen's distinctive ethereal vocals. Many listeners first encountered them when Rhys Fulber's electronic music project Conjure One recorded a cover of Lunascape's "Tears from the Moon" in 2003, with Sinéad O'Connor on vocals.

The Lunascape track "Surrender" received recognition thanks to being the title score for the popular police series Flikken in Belgium and the Netherlands. Dancing Ferret released Lunascape's last album Innerside in April 2008. The band split in December 2008.

== Discography ==
- Reflecting Seyelence (2002)
- Mindstalking (2004)
- Reminiscence (2005)
- Innerside (2008)
