= A Turtle's Tale: Sammy's Adventures =

2010 animated film co-produced and directed by Ben Stassen

- Dutch-language Belgian theatrical release poster
- Directed by: Ben Stassen
- Screenplay by: Domonic Paris
- Produced by: Gina Gallo; Mimi Maynard; Domonic Paris; Ben Stassen; Caroline Van Iseghem
- Starring: UK version; Gemma Arterton; Dominic Cooper; John Hurt; Kayvan Novak; Robert Sheehan; US version; Anthony Anderson; Ed Begley Jr.; Pat Carroll; Tim Curry; Stacy Keach; Yuri Lowenthal; Kathy Griffin; Melanie Griffith; Jenny McCarthy
- Edited by: Julien Ducenne; Aurelie Rosman
- Music by: Ramin Djawadi
- Production companies: StudioCanal nWave Pictures; Illuminata Pictures
- Distributed by: StudioCanal (France); Kinepolis Film Distribution (Belgium)
- Release dates: 12 June 2010 (California); 11 August 2010 (France)
- Running time: 86 minutes
- Countries: Belgium; France
- Languages: English; French; Dutch
- Box office: $70.6 million

A Turtle's Tale: Sammy's Adventures (known as Sammy's Adventures: The Secret Passage in the progress) is a 2010 animated adventure film co-produced and directed by Ben Stassen. The film was released on 12 June 2010 in California, and on 11 August 2010 in France. The British version stars Dominic Cooper, Gemma Arterton, John Hurt, Kayvan Novak, and Robert Sheehan; the US version stars Yuri Lowenthal, Anthony Anderson, Tim Curry, Kathy Griffin, Melanie Griffith, and Jenny McCarthy.

== Plot ==
In 1959, Sammy, a green sea turtle, hatches on a beach in Baja California and is attacked by a seagull. He manages to escape along with another hatchling sea turtle named Shelly, who was also attacked by another seagull. As Sammy is sleeping, the waves push the raft he is on into the water, carrying it away with him still on it.

The next morning, Sammy befriends a leatherback sea turtle named Ray, who also hatched the day before. Ten years later in 1969, the raft suddenly collapses, leaving Sammy and Ray without their home. Sammy, Ray, and hundreds of fish are caught in trawl nets and separated. Hours later, Sammy is thrown back into the sea unconscious but gets saved by a dolphin.

Sammy makes it to shore and, the next morning, finds himself in an enclosure, taken in by hippies led by a woman named Snow and a French cat named Fluffy. Eventually, Sammy shares the enclosure with a larger turtle named Vera. Some time later, Vera is released back into the sea and the unauthorized hippies are evicted from their beach by the police, leaving Sammy behind.

Sammy returns to the ocean, joined by Vera. On a food search, Sammy and Vera run into a female turtle who is being chased by a shark. Sammy and Vera rescue the female turtle, who turns out to be Shelly. Sammy asks Shelly to travel the world with him, stating that he has learned of a secret passage and wants to find it.

Sammy notices a ship nearby heading toward a place in the distance. Sammy and Shelly follow the ship and they made it to Panama Canal (what they assume is the secret passage). When the pair is about to get through it, they are separated after trying to pass through a lock.

While searching for Shelly, Sammy travels to Antarctica, where he encounters a whale and asks her for some help. However, the whale accidentally draws attention to a ship full of whalers that fires a harpoon at her. Due to Sammy's timely warning, the whale dodges, and the harpoon instead hits the floating refrigerator that Sammy is on. Sammy, who is freezing in the water, is rescued by Green Warrior workers.

As he is being rehabilitated, Sammy reunites with Shelly, who is also being treated for frostbite. Soon after Sammy is released back into the ocean, he reunites with Ray and rescues her from being trapped in a container. Sammy and Shelly get married and leave to journey around the world.

In 2009, Sammy and Ray watch turtle hatchlings (Sammy's grandchildren) scramble across the street from their nest to get to the water. Sammy intervenes to help the last hatchling, who is struggling to get out of the nest, and watches him get to the ocean.

== Voice cast ==
Character	Voice actor	
Character	United Kingdom	United States
Sammy	Dominic Cooper	Yuri Lowenthal (young), Billy Unger (hatchling)
Shelly	Gemma Arterton	Jenny McCarthy (young), Isabelle Fuhrman (hatchling)
Ray	Robert Sheehan	Anthony Anderson (young), Carlos McCullers (hatchling)
Fluffy	Kayvan Novak	Tim Curry
Sandra	Christine Bleakley	Sophi Bairley
Snow	Melanie Cooper	Melanie Griffith
Jacko	Geoff Searle	Scott Menville
Slim	Kayvan Novak	Charlie Adler
Vera	Anjella Mackintosh	Kathy Griffin
Ben	Ben Bishop	Al Rodriego
Rita	Sohm Kapila	Roxanne Reese
Robbie	Kayvan Novak	Darren Capozzi
Ollie	Ben Bishop	Yuri Lowenthal
Sandra	Christine Bleakley	Sophi Bairley
Grandpa Sammy / Narrator	John Hurt	Stacy Keach
Penguins	Ben Kroll	Bill Tom
Old Female Turtle	N/A	Pat Carroll
Seals	Stacy Matt	Johnny Kroll
Eagles	Ben Searle	Bill Reese

== Music ==
Music for the film was composed by Ramin Djawadi. American pop singer Bruno Mars contributed several songs to the film, including "Count On Me" and "Talking to the Moon". Other songs in the film include "Free" by Donavon Frankenreiter, "Happy People" by Dry Spells, "Love Today" by Mika, "Star Jingle Bells" by Justin Lavallee, "California Dreamin'" by The Mamas & the Papas, "Love Will Find a Way" by Mishon, "You're Not Alone" by Self, "Love Child" by Fibes, Oh Fibes!, and "Shark in the Water" by V V Brown.

== Reception ==
Sammy's Adventures received mixed reviews from critics and audiences. On the review aggregator website Rotten Tomatoes, 44% of 18 critics' reviews are positive, with an average rating of 4.5/10.

Sandie Angulo Chen of Common Sense Media rate the film three stars out of five, stating that the film's "noticeable improvement to Stassen's other historical drama Fly Me to the Moon." She also notes that the story is "more accessible to kids," the characters are "better developed," and the messages aren't as "preachy." She said about the film is too similar to Pixar's Finding Nemo, but, in conclusion, "it may not be Pixar, but it's a surprisingly educational pick for younger kids with a curiosity about the sea." Peter Bradshaw of The Guardian rated the film two stars out of five, writing that the film comparison of Finding Nemo, "of which its visuals and script are a feeble copy, it looks underpowered and the voice-work is often a bit laboured." He also wrote that the film's message is "laudable" for "something earnest, lifeless and school-projectish about the whole affair." Beth Cook of The Mancunion wrote of the film that the animation is "unparalleled." She criticised that the film's "lack of direction almost ruins what otherwise could plausibly be described as an 'emotional rollercoaster'," initially rapid pace of the film, and "annoyingly rushed" ending. She also notes that the message of the film is "irritatingly moral undertone."

== Legacy ==
=== Sequel ===
A sequel to the film, entitled A Turtle's Tale 2: Sammy's Escape from Paradise, also known as Sammy's Great Escape in the UK, was released in Belgium on 15 August 2012.

=== Television series ===
A spin-off TV series called Sammy & Co premiered in France on M6 in September 2014. Netflix later acquired the show for eight years from 2015 until its eventual removal from the platform in March 2023.

== Home media ==
This film was released on Blu-ray and DVD in the US on 3 April 2012 by Vivendi Entertainment.
