= NWave Studios =

Belgian animation studio

nWave Studios
- Type: Private
- Industry: CGI animation; 4D films
- Founded: 1994; 32 years ago
- Founder: Ben Stassen
- Headquarters: Brussels, Belgium
- Area served: Worldwide
- Key people: Eric Dillens (CEO)
- Products: Animated films
- Owner: MZM (majority stake)
- Website: www.nwave.com

nWave Studios is a Belgian animation studio based in Brussels, Belgium, with an American office in Los Angeles, California.

== History ==
nWave Studios was founded in 1994 by Ben Stassen.

In September 2018, Matthieu Zeller's production group MZM acquired a majority stake in nWave Pictures.

== Productions ==
=== Feature films ===
Title	Release date	Co-production with	Distributor(s)	Gross
Fly Me to the Moon	30 January 2008	Illuminata Pictures uMedia uFilm	Kinepolis Film Distribution; Summit Entertainment	$46.6 million
A Turtle's Tale: Sammy's Adventures	4 August 2010	StudioCanal		$70.6 million
A Turtle's Tale 2: Sammy's Escape from Paradise	15 August 2012	StudioCanal		$49.2 million
The House of Magic	25 December 2013	StudioCanal; Anton Capital Entertainment uMedia	Belga Films; StudioCanal	$64.1 million
Robinson Crusoe	30 March 2016	Illuminata Pictures uFilm	Belga Films; StudioCanal	$40 million
The Son of Bigfoot	26 July 2017	StudioCanal; Belga Productions; Illuminata Pictures; Waterman Entertainment	Belga Films; StudioCanal	$47 million
The Queen's Corgi	3 April 2019	Belga Films	Belga Films; Lionsgate (UK); Freestyle Releasing (USA)	$35.5 million
Bigfoot Family	5 August 2020	Octopolis	Charades; Netflix	$11 million
Chickenhare and the Hamster of Darkness	16 February 2022	Octopolis; Dark Horse Entertainment	Sony Pictures International Productions; Netflix (International)	$11 million
The Inseparables	10 August 2023	Octopolis	Belga Films; A Contracorriente Films; Viva Pictures (USA)	$2.3 million
Chickenhare and the Secret of the Groundhog	15 October 2025	Octopolis; Dark Horse Entertainment	SND (France); Sony Pictures (International); Angel Studios (USA)	$9.7 million
Yugly	14 October 2026	Octopolis	SND (France)	$283,113

=== Upcoming ===
Title	Release date	References
Untitled Jean-Paul Gaultier project	2027	
Yes, Chef!	2028	

=== 3D films ===
- Thrill Ride: The Science of Fun (1997)
- Magic Carpet Adventure (1998)
- Encounter in the Third Dimension (1999)
- Alien Adventure (1999)
- Haunted Castle (2001)
- SOS Planet (2002)
- Misadventures in 3D (2003)
- Haunted House (2004)
- Wild Safari 3D (2005)
- Jett and Jin (2006)
- African Adventure: Safari in the Okavango (2007)
- Fly Me to the Moon 4D (2008)
- The Curse of Skull Rock (2009)
- Turtle Vision (2010)
- Pirate Story (2011)
- The Little Prince (2011)
- Castle Secret (2011)
- 20,000 Leagues Under the Sea (2012)
- Deepo: A Fish Story (2012)
- The Good, The Bad and a Horse (2013)
- The House of Magic 4D (2013)
- Sherlock Holmes (2013)
- The Lost World (2013)
- Haunted Mansion (2014)
- Knights Quest (2014)
- Robinson Crusoe 3D (2016)
- Birds of a Feather (2016)
- Return to the Lost World (2017)
- The Son of Bigfoot 4D (2017)
- Jolly Roger (2018)
- Chaos in Wonderland (2019)
- Dog Games (2019)
- Rex: A Royal Topdog (2019)
- Bigfoot Family 4D (2020)
- Wanted Alive (2021)
- Trapper's Adventures (2022)
- Meg and the Lost Scepter (2022)
- Happy Family: Next Level (2023)
- Theater of Dreams (2023)
- Meg and the Quest for the Holy Spork (2025)
- Yugly, the King of the Show 4D (2026)

== Reception ==
=== Box office grosses ===
Film	Budget	North America		Overseas gross	Worldwide gross (unadjusted)	Ref(s)
Film	Budget	Opening	Gross (unadjusted)	Overseas gross	Worldwide gross (unadjusted)	Ref(s)
Fly Me to the Moon	$25 million					
A Turtle's Tale: Sammy's Adventures	—N/a					
A Turtle's Tale 2: Sammy's Escape from Paradise	—N/a					
The House of Magic	$34 million					
Robinson Crusoe	$13 million					
The Son of Bigfoot	$20 million					
The Queen's Corgi	$25 million	—N/a	—N/a	$35,515,687	$35,515,687	
Bigfoot Family	$25 million					
Chickenhare and the Hamster of Darkness	$20 million	—N/a	—N/a	—N/a	$10,885,116	
Chickenhare and the Secret of the Groundhog	$23 million	—N/a	—N/a	—N/a	$9,688,921	
Yugly	$25 million	—N/a	—N/a	—N/a	$317,812	

=== Critical and public response ===
Film	Critical
Film	Rotten Tomatoes
Fly Me to the Moon	20%
A Turtle's Tale: Sammy's Adventures	44%
A Turtle's Tale 2: Sammy's Escape from Paradise	20%
The House of Magic	71%
Robinson Crusoe	17%
The Son of Bigfoot	74%
The Queen's Corgi	0%
