= Intermedia (company) =

US film production company

Intermedia Films
- Type: Private
- Industry: Film
- Predecessor: Majestic Films International; Largo Entertainment
- Founded: 1991; 35 years ago (as Intermedia Film Equities); 1995; 31 years ago (as Intermedia Films)
- Founder: Nigel Sinclair; Guy East
- Defunct: 2006; 20 years ago
- Fate: Renamed to IM Global
- Successor: IM Global
- Headquarters: Los Angeles, California, U.S.
- Owner: IM Internationalmedia AG
- Number of employees: 11–50
- Website: internationalmedia.de (archive)

Intermedia Films was an American independent film production company, wholly owned by IM Internationalmedia AG.

The company mostly acted as a co-producer, funding films through the IMF (Internationale Medien und Film, German for "International Media and Film") funds. As of 2023, Intermedia's library is currently owned by Library Liquidity Company, with Shout! Studios handling distribution.

== History ==
The company was founded in London in 1991 as Intermedia Film Equities. Four years later, it was re-established as Intermedia Films by Guy East (formerly of Goldcrest Films and Majestic Films International) and Nigel Sinclair. By 1997, Intermedia began operations in Los Angeles, as did Pacifica Film Distribution. The two companies merged on March 29, 2000.

Its first success of note was Sliding Doors, starring Gwyneth Paltrow, which opened the Sundance Film Festival. In 2003, the company began to scale back film production, and as a result, Basil Iwanyk had left Intermedia to form Thunder Road Films and took a lot of projects with them.

== Filmography ==
Year	Title	Director(s)	Production partner(s)	Distributor(s)	Budget	Box office
1998	Sliding Doors	Peter Howitt	Mirage Enterprises	Miramax Films (United States and Canada); Alliance Atlantis (Canada); Paramount Pictures (United Kingdom, Ireland, Australia, New Zealand and Korea through United International Pictures); Sun Distribution (Latin America); AMLF (France); Belga Films (Belgium and Luxembourg); Buena Vista International (Netherlands); Jugendfilm (Germany and Austria); Highlight Communication AG (Switerland); Medusa Distribuzione (Italy); Warner Sogefilms (Spain); Lusomundo (Portugal); Sandrew Metronome (Scandinavia); Umut Sanat (Turkey); Spentzos Film (Greece and Cyprus); Monolith Films (Poland); Mirax (Hungary); Alexandra Films (Bulgaria); Intersonic (Czech Republic); KUZUI Enterprises (Japan)	$6 million	$67 million
1998	Playing by Heart	Willard Carroll	Hyperion Pictures	Miramax Films	$14–20 million	$3,970,078
1998	The Land Girls	David Leland	Gramercy Pictures, Channel Four Films, Greenpoint Films, Camera One, West Eleven Films, Arena Films, Canal+, Sofineurope	Polygram Filmed Entertainment	$6 million	$3.2 million
1998	Clay Pigeons	David Dobkin	Gramercy Pictures, Scott Free Productions	Polygram Filmed Entertainment	$8 million	$1.8 million
1999	Whatever Happened to Harold Smith?	Peter Hewitt	October Films, West Eleven Films	USA Films	N/A	N/A
2000	Nurse Betty	Neil LaBute	Gramercy Pictures, Pacifica Film, Propaganda Films, ab'-strakt pictures	USA Films (United States); Universal Pictures (Canada, Latin America, Australia, New Zealand, Italy and Japan); Pathé Distribution (the U.K. and Ireland); Lolistar (France); Belga Films (Belgium and Luxembourg); Independent Films (Netherlands); Kinowelt GmbH (Germany and Austria); Ascot Elite Entertainment (Switzerland); Tripictures (Spain); Lusomundo (Portugal); A&P Filmcilik (Turkey); Sandrew Metronome (Scandinavia); Odeon (Greece and Cyprus); Monolith Film (Poland); Budapest Film (Hungary); Sunny Films (Bulgaria); Tara Film (Slovakia); Bostonfilm (Czech Republic); Blitz (former Yugoslavia); West Film (CIS)	$25 million	$29.4 million
2000	Where the Money Is	Marek Kanievska	Gramercy Pictures, Pacifica Film, Scott Free Productions	USA Films (United States); Universal Pictures (Canada); Buena Vista International (Latin America and Scandinavia); SND (France); Belga Films (Belgium and Luxembourg); Independent Films (Netherlands); Roadshow Entertainment (Australia and New Zealand)	$28 million	$7 million
2000	Up at the Villa	Philip Haas	October Films, Pacifica Film, Mirage Enterprises	USA Films	N/A	N/A
2000	Company Man	Peter Askin, Douglas McGrath	N/A	Paramount Classics (North and Latin America and Japan); Pathé Distribution (United Kingdom and Ireland); Roadshow Entertainment (Australia and New Zealand); UGC PH (France; through UGC Fox Distribution); Indies Film Distribution (Netherlands); Helkon Filmverleih (Germany and Austria); Ascot Elite Entertainment (Switzerland); Medusa Distribuzione (Italy); Vértice 360 (Spain); Lusomundo (Portugal); New Films International (Turkey); Imperial Entertainment (Poland); Alexandra Films (Bulgaria)	$16 million	$146,193
2000	Love's Labour's Lost	Kenneth Branagh	The Shakespeare Film Company	Miramax Films	$13 million	$299,792
2001	Enigma	Michael Apted	Jagged Films, Broadway Video	Manhattan Pictures (United States); Buena Vista International (United Kingdom)	N/A	N/A
2001	The Wedding Planner	Adam Shankman	Columbia Pictures, Tapestry Films, Dee Gee Entertainment, IMF Internationale Medien und Film GmbH & Co. Produktions KG, Prufrock Pictures	Sony Pictures Releasing (United States, Canada and German and Austrian home media); Buena Vista International (Latin America); Pathé Distribution (United Kingdom and Ireland); Roadshow Entertainment (Australia and New Zealand); United International Pictures (South Africa); SND Films (France); Indies Film Distribution (Netherlands); Helkon Filmverleih (Germany and Austria); Ascot Elite Entertainment (Switzerland); Eagle Pictures (Italy); Filmax (Spain); Lusomundo (Portugal); Svensk Filmindustri (Scandinavia); Umut Sanat (Turkey); Spentzos Film (Greece and Cyprus); Vision Film Distribution (Poland); Kinowelt (Hungary); Alexandra Films (Bulgaria); Hollywood Classic Entertainment (Czech Republic); Blitz (former Yugoslavia); Paradise Group (CIS); Nippon Herald Films (Japan); Cinema Service and Taewon Entertainment (Korea); Sahamongkol Film International (Thailand); Pioneer Films (Philippines); Mei Ah Entertainment (Hong Kong)	$35 million	$95 million
2001	K-PAX	Iain Softley	Lawrence Gordon Productions	Universal Pictures (North and Latin America, France and Asia excluding Japan and Korea); Buena Vista International (Australia, New Zealand and Scandinavia); FilmFour Distribution (United Kingdom and Ireland); Constantin Film (Germany and Austria); 01 Distribution (Italy); Lauren Films (Spain); Belga Films (Belgium and Luxembourg); Independent Films (Netherlands); Lusomundo (Portugal); New Films International (Turkey); Spentzos Film (Greece and Cyprus); Kino Swiat (Poland); SPI International (Czech Republic, Slovakia and Hungary); Alexandra Films (Bulgaria); Blitz (former Yugoslavia); Paradise Group (CIS); Nippon Herald Films (Japan)	$68 million	$65 million
2001	Iris	Richard Eyre	BBC Films, Fox Iris Productions, Mirage Enterprises	Miramax Films (United States), Buena Vista International (United Kingdom)	$5.5 million	$16.2 million
2001	Blow Dry	Paddy Breathnach	Mirage Enterprises, IMF Internationale Medien und Film GmbH & Co. Produktions KG	Miramax Films	N/A	$830,286
2001	After Image	Robert Manganelli	Catch 23 Entertainment	Buena Vista Home Entertainment	N/A	N/A
2002	K-19: The Widowmaker	Kathryn Bigelow	First Light Production, IMF Internationale Medien und Film GmbH & Co. 2. Produktions KG, K-19 Film Production, National Geographic Society, Palomar Pictures	Paramount Pictures (North and Latin America, United Kingdom, Ireland, Australia, New Zealand, France, the Benelux, Indonesia, Malaysia, Singapore and Philippines); Nu Metro Films (South Africa); Buena Vista International (Scandinavia); Constantin Film Verleih (Germany and Austria); Ascot Elite Entertainment (Switzerland); 01 Distribution (Italy); Filmax (Spain); New Films International (Turkey); Lusomundo (Portugal); Spentzos Film (Greece and Cyprus); Vision Film Distribution (Poland); SPI International (Czech Republic, Slovakia and Hungary); Alexandra Films (Bulgaria); Blitz (former Yugoslavia); Paradise Group (CIS); Nippon Herald Films (Japan); Cineworld Entertainment (Korea); Edko Films (Hong Kong)	$90 million	$65.7 million
2002	The Quiet American	Phillip Noyce	IMF Internationale Medien und Film GmbH & Co. 2. Produktions KG, Mirage Enterprises, Pacifica Film and Saga	Miramax Films	$30 million	$27,674,124
2002	Adaptation	Spike Jonze	Columbia Pictures, Good Machine, Propaganda Films	Sony Pictures Releasing (North and Latin America, the U.K., Ireland, Australia, New Zealand, Germany, Austria, Italy and select Asian territories including Taiwan and Indonesia); Nu Metro Films (South Africa); BAC Films (France); Belga Films (Belgium and Luxembourg); Independent Films (Netherlands); Ascot Elite Entertainment (Switzerland); Lauren Film (Spain); Lusomundo (Portugal); Umut Sanat (Turkey); Sandrew Metronome (Scandinavia); Spentzos Film (Greece and Cyprus); Vision Film Distribution (Poland); SPI International (Czech Republic, Slovakia and Hungary); Galla Team (Bulgaria); Blitz (former Yugoslavia); Paradise Group (CIS); Sky Films (Philippines); Asmik Ace (Japan); Showbox (Korea); Golden Scene (Hong Kong)	$19 million	$32.8 million
2002	Dark Blue	Ron Shelton	United Artists, Alphaville	MGM Distribution Co.	$15 million	$12,150,301
2002	She Gets What She Wants	Melanie Mayron	IMF Internationale Medien und Film GmbH & Co. 2. Produktions KG	Constantin Film	N/A	$1.7 million
2003	National Security	Dennis Dugan	Columbia Pictures	Sony Pictures Releasing	N/A	$54 million
2003	Terminator 3: Rise of the Machines	Jonathan Mostow	C2 Pictures, IMF Internationale Medien und Film GmbH & Co. Produktions KG, Mostow/Lieberman Productions	Warner Bros. Pictures (United States and Canada); Italia Film (Middle East); Toho-Towa (Japan); Cinema Service (Korea); Columbia TriStar Film Distributors International (through Columbia Pictures) (International)	$187.3 million ($167.3 million excluding production overhead)	$433.3 million
2003	Basic	John McTiernan	Columbia Pictures, Phoenix Pictures	Sony Pictures Releasing (United States, Canada and Japan); 20th Century Fox (Latin America); Icon Film Distribution (the U.K., Ireland, Australia and New Zealand); Nu Metro Films (South Africa); SND Films (France); Medusa Distribuzione (Italy); Constantin Film (Germany and Austria); Ascot Elite Entertainment (Switzerland); Les Films de l'Elysée (Belgium and Luxembourg); Moonlight Films (Netherlands); Manga Films (Spain); ZON Audiovisuais (Portugal); Özen Film (Turkey); Nordisk Film (Scandinavia); Spentzos Film (Greece and Cyprus); Monolith Films (Poland); InterCom (Hungary); Galla Team (Bulgaria); Tara Film (Slovakia); Boston Film (Czech Republic); Blitz (former Yugoslavia); Paradise Group and Pyramid (CIS); Korea Pictures (Korea); Panorama Entertainment (Hong Kong); Star Entertainment (India)	$50 million	$42.8 million
2003	The Life of David Gale	Alan Parker	Saturn Films	Universal Pictures (Worldwide); Paramount Pictures (Scandinavia; through United International Pictures); Lusomundo (Portugal); New Films International (Turkey); Ascot Elite Entertainment (Switzerland); Spentzos Film (Greece and Cyprus); Monolith Films (Poland); InterCom (Hungary); Galla Team (Bulgaria); Tara Film (Slovakia); Boston Film (Czech Republic); Blitz (former Yugoslavia); Paradise Group (CIS)	$38 million	$38.9 million
2004	Welcome to Mooseport	Donald Petrie	N/A	20th Century Fox	$30 million	$14.6 million
2004	Alexander	Oliver Stone	Ixtlan Productions, France 3 Cinéma, Pacific Film, Egmond Film & Television, IMF Internationale Medien und Film GmbH & Co. 3 Produktions KG	Warner Bros. Pictures (North and Latin America, the U.K., Ireland, Australia, New Zealand, South Africa and Italy); Pathé Distribution (France); Cinéart (Belgium and Luxembourg); A-Film Distribution (Netherlands); Constantin Film (Germany and Austria); Ascot Elite Entertainment (Switzerland); Tripictures (Spain); Lusomundo (Portugal); Pinema (Turkey); Nordisk Film (Scandinavia); Audio Visual Enterprises (Greece and Cyprus); Monolith Films (Poland); InterCom (Hungary); SPI International (Czech Republic and Slovakia); Alexandra Films (Bulgaria); Blitz (former Yugoslavia); Paradise Group (CIS); Nippon Herald Films (Japan); Cinema Service (Korea); Pioneer Films (Philippines); Shaw Entertainment (Singapore); E-City Films (India); Panasia Films (Hong Kong); Lotus Five Star (Malaysia); CMC Entertainment (Taiwan)	$155 million	$167.3 million
2004	The Aviator	Martin Scorsese	Warner Bros. Pictures, Miramax Films, Forward Pass, Appian Way, Initial Entertainment Group, Cappa Productions	Miramax Films (United States, the U.K., Ireland, Germany, Austria, France and Italy); Warner Bros. Pictures (Canada, Latin America, Australia and New Zealand); Buena Vista International (United Kingdom, Ireland, Germany and Austria); TFM Distribution (France); 01 Distribution (Italy); 20th Century Fox (Spain); Les Films de l'Elysée (Belgium and Luxembourg); Independent Films (Netherlands); Ascot Elite Entertainment (Switzerland); Pris Audiovisuais (Portugal); Pinema (Turkey); Nordisk Film (Scandinavia); Spentzos Film (Greece and Cyprus); Kino Swiat (Poland); Mokep Film Distribution (Hungary); Magic Box (Czech Republic); Filmag (Slovakia); Alexandra Films (Bulgaria); Blitz (former Yugoslavia); Central Partnership (CIS); Nippon Herald Films (Japan)	$110 million	$213.7 million
2004	Mindhunters	Renny Harlin	Dimension Films, Outlaw Productions, Avenue Pictures, Weed Road Pictures	Miramax Films (United States and Canada); Alliance Atlantis (Canada); Sony Pictures Releasing International (Latin America, the U.K., Ireland, Australia, New Zealand, France, Portugal, Malaysia, India, Pakistan and Korea); Belga Films (Belgium and Luxembourg); Independent Films (Netherlands); Eagle Pictures (Italy); Tobis (Germany and Austria); Ascot Elite Entertainment (Switzerland); Aurum Producciones (Spain); Özen Film (Turkey); Nordisk Film (Scandinavia); Spentzos Film (Greece and Cyprus); Monolith Films (Poland); Budapest Film (Hungary); Alexandra Films (Bulgaria); Tara Film (Slovakia); Bostonfilm (Czech Republic); Blitz (former Yugoslavia); Paradise Group (CIS); Xanadu (Japan); Era Entertainment (Hong Kong); Shaw Entertainment (Singapore)	$27 million	$21.1 million
2004	Suspect Zero	E. Elias Merhige	Lakeshore Entertainment and Cruise/Wagner Productions	Paramount Pictures (United States and Canada); Forum Film (Israel); Umut Sanat (Turkey); Columbia TriStar Film Distributors International (International)	$27 million	$11.4 million
If Only	Gil Junger	Outlaw Productions, Love Spell Entertainment	Sony Pictures Television	$3 million	$532,673 million	
2006	Basic Instinct 2	Michael Caton-Jones	Metro-Goldwyn-Mayer Pictures, C2 Pictures	Sony Pictures Releasing (United States and Canada); Buena Vista International (Latin America); 20th Century Fox (Australia and New Zealand); Warner Bros. Pictures (Italy); Entertainment Film Distributors (United Kingdom and Ireland); Océan Films (France); Belga Films (Belgium and Luxembourg); Independent Films (Netherlands); Constantin Film (Germany and Austria); Ascot Elite Entertainment (Switzerland); Araba Films (Spain; through United International Pictures); LNK Audiovisuais (Portugal); Pinema (Turkey); Svensk Filmindustri (Scandinavia); Spentzos Film (Greece and Cyprus); Best Film (Poland); Intersonic (Czech Republic, Slovakia and Hungary); Alexandra Films (Bulgaria); Blitz (former Yugoslavia); Paradise Group (CIS); Sinergy (Japan); Cinema Service (Korea); Deltamac Co. (Hong Kong)	$70 million	$38.6 million
2006	RV	Barry Sonnenfeld	Columbia Pictures, Red Wagon Entertainment	Sony Pictures Releasing	$50 million	$87.5 million
