= Encounter in the Third Dimension =

1999 film by Ben Stassen and Sean McLeod Phillips

- Directed by: Ben Stassen; Sean McLeod Phillips
- Written by: Ben Stassen; Kurt Frey
- Produced by: George Elder; Kim Nelson Fry; Charlotte Huggins; Sean Macleod Phillips; Ben Stassen
- Starring: Stuart Pankin; Cassandra Peterson; Andrea Thompson
- Narrated by: Harry Shearer
- Cinematography: Sean MacLeod Phillips
- Edited by: Sean MacLeod Phillips
- Music by: Louis Vyncke
- Production companies: Iwerks Entertainment; Luminair Film Productions; Movida; nWave Pictures
- Distributed by: Tycho Brahe Planetarium, Copenhagen; Ventura Distribution; nWave Pictures
- Release date: March 31, 1999
- Running time: 40m
- Countries: United States; Australia; New Zealand; Turkey; France; Denmark; Austria; Poland; Slovenia; Spain
- Language: English

Encounter in the Third Dimension (sometimes referred to as Encounter in the Thrid Dimension due to the title screen's spelling error) is a 3D film directed by Ben Stassen and Sean McLeod Phillips. It was released in the US on March 31, 1999. It has been shown in 3D theaters and released on DVD with 3D glasses, in both 2D and 3D format.

== Plot ==
In his lab, the Professor (Stuart Pankin) does an intro for the Institute of 3-D Technology, but the intro dies, so the Professor uses the Letter Cannon for the title of the movie. However, it spells the word "third" as "thrid", so the Professor activates the spell correction, resulting in the lab's screen being destroyed and several fires being started, which are put out by the Professor's robot assistant, M.A.X. (Stuart Pankin). The Professor has a new system called Real O Vision for 3-D technology, and to demonstrate has Elvira, Mistress of the Dark (Cassandra Peterson) perform a haunted house song, but the machine still has some bugs in it and traps Elvira between the second and third dimensions.

While the Professor tries to fix the problem, he has M.A.X. entertain the audience. When M.A.X. starts telling jokes, the Professor tells him to explain the difference between 2D and 3D, which he does, explaining that 3D has depth to it unlike 2D. After pictures from the stereographic archives are shown, the Professor tries his demonstration again, but this time the machines turn Elvira into cardboard. As he tries to fix this problem, he tells the audience about 3D movies, and several clips are shown, particularly clips where objects or people are thrown at the camera.

Afterward the Professor opens up the Diorama of 3D videos, such as Dino Island, T-2 3D and the Abandoned Mine. M.A.X. grabs a stick of dynamite, and puts it in his head when the Professor tells him to throw it away, and it explodes, briefly popping his eyes out. When he tells the Professor it was only a simulation, the Professor retaliates by making him enter the simulator, which does a simulation of traveling to the center of the Earth.

M.A.X. explains how 3D movies are made, and enters the television, but soon becomes trapped inside it by the Professor, who is tired of being annoyed by M.A.X., and mutes the TV. Then he begins the demonstration with Elvira and the haunted house, which works perfectly. After it is over, however, Elvira turns the Professor into cardboard and shuts off the TV with M.A.X. still inside it. She tells Ruth in the Booth (Andrea Thompson) that she'll let him out in an hour, but when the machine seems to malfunction she says "Or not."

== Cast ==
- Stuart Pankin as the Professor and M.A.X.
- Cassandra Peterson as Elvira, Mistress of the Dark
- Harry Shearer as the Narrator
- Andrea Thompson as Ruth in the Booth

== Reception ==
On the review aggregator website Rotten Tomatoes, 73% of 11 critics' reviews are positive.
