= Last Days of Coney Island =

- Directed by: Ralph Bakshi
- Written by: Ralph Bakshi
- Produced by: Ralph Bakshi; Eddie Bakshi; Adam Rackoff; Matthew Modine
- Starring: Omar Jones; Libby Aubrey; Ron Thompson; Tina Romanus; Richard Singer; Jonathan Yudis; Robert Costanzo; Joey Camen
- Cinematography: Eddie Bakshi; Jess Gorell
- Edited by: Zac Wittstruck
- Music by: Mark Taylor
- Animation by: Ralph Bakshi; Mark Phillips; Elana Pritchard; Omar Jones
- Release date: October 29, 2015
- Running time: 22 minutes
- Country: United States
- Language: English
- Budget: $174,195

Last Days of Coney Island is a 2015 American adult animated short film written, produced, directed and animated by Ralph Bakshi. The story concerns a NYPD detective, the prostitute he alternately loves and arrests, and the seedy characters that haunt the streets of New York City's run-down amusement district. It is notable for being the last film that Bakshi directed and animated before he retired from animation.

== Plot ==
In 1960s Brooklyn, little person Shorty contemplates his lonely life as a freak show act on Coney Island. He is routinely beaten up by customers and carnival employees. One night, he catches his mother, a fortune teller, having sex with a clown; Shorty violently murders them both, catching the attention of the mafia.

Shorty is infatuated with the prostitute Molly, who is in love with the cop Max. At a police hangout, Max's partner Louie suggests busting the whorehouse where Molly works; Max reluctantly agrees on the condition that Molly is escorted out first. During the raid, Max finds Molly still working; she is promptly arrested, leaving Max in tears. In a nearby bar populated by cross-dressers, Louie reveals that he planned for Molly to be arrested, leaving Max for himself.

Five years later, Shorty is now a mob collector, demanding money from the freak show workers. When a clown refuses to pay, Shorty butchers him in front of everyone. Despite Louie's constant affection, Max is still pining over Molly. Louie is fed up and leaves Max to fend for himself on the boardwalk. On his way home, Max meets Molly, just released from prison; he claims that he's changed too much to continue their relationship and leaves. Shorty witnesses their meeting and shoots Molly in cold blood.

Max is arrested for Molly's death and savagely beaten by the cops. The mob questions Shorty about the murder; he blames Lee Harvey Oswald, prompting his own assassination at the hands of Jack Ruby. The lights dim on Coney Island while Louie, dejected, drives off into the night.

== Voice cast ==
- Omar Jones as Shorty
- Libby Aubrey
- Ron Thompson as Cops
- Tina Romanus as Molly
- Rick Singer as Louie (credited as Richard Singer)
- Jonathan Yudis as Godfather
- Robert Costanzo as Max
- Joey Camen as Men

== Production ==
=== Development ===
A still from an earlier version of the project.

Ralph Bakshi had previously pitched the film to major studios such as Pixar and DreamWorks, but was unable to find anyone who wanted to take on the project. When technology began advancing to the point where Bakshi could begin the project on a lower budget, he decided to take on the project himself and produce it independently working with a small development crew in New Mexico. Bakshi is quoted as saying that the animation is "probably higher quality than anything I ever made, at a cost so low it's embarrassing. Everything I used to do in my old movies that required hundreds of people and huge salaries is now done in a box. It took 250 people to make Heavy Traffic, now I'm down to five. I kiss the computer every morning — f-----' unbelievable!"

Production was announced in 2006, attracting much interest, but no official funding. According to Bakshi: "I had about eight minutes of film and a completed script. I thought budget was a slam dunk. For a Bakshi comeback film, it seemed like a no-brainer. [...] I asked one guy [in Hollywood], 'Should I have a budget of $150 million and pocket the rest?' He said, 'Yeah, but you have to make it PG'". Bakshi ended the production to rethink his approach towards the film. Its production status was left uncertain.

On October 20, 2012, at Dallas Comic-Con: Fan Days, Ralph Bakshi participated in a Q&A where it was stated that he would take Last Days of Coney Island to Kickstarter in an attempt to crowdsource the funding.

A Kickstarter campaign was launched on February 1, 2013 to complete funding for the first short in the film. On March 3, the film was successfully funded and raised $174,195 from 1,290 backers. Bakshi confirmed production had begun.

=== Casting ===
When the project was first announced on Kickstarter, voice actress Tina Romanus, who had previously worked with Bakshi on Wizards and Hey Good Lookin', was confirmed to play the role of Molly, the main character's love interest. In February 2013, actor Matthew Modine was cast in the film after coming across the film's Kickstarter campaign online in the role of Shorty, described as "a 4-foot-tall mafia collector who thinks he's Elvis Presley and sings like Chet Baker".

Omar Jones ended up replacing Matthew Modine in the lead role of Shorty. Other voices include Ralph himself, Eddie Bakshi, Jess Gorell, Jonathan Yudis, Joey Camen and Ron Thompson.

=== Animation ===
Animation on Last Days of Coney Island was drawn traditionally and completed digitally.

Much of the production was aided with the use of Toon Boom Studio, computer software designed to assemble 2D animation. Ralph Bakshi is quoted as saying "Eddie [Bakshi's son] began some coloring and refining of artwork in Photoshop then gradually moved over to doing this in Toon Boom Studio. The crossover was relatively painless. The programs worked well together. [...] I set up the picture in a traditional manner then Eddie uses Toon Boom Studio to do everything else. My animator Doug Compton also uses Toon Boom Studio to assemble and send pencil tests and animatics. Toon Boom Studio essentially becomes the studio."

Early on, Colleen Cox was announced to be the lead animator of the film. Tsukasa Kanayama was also hired as a storyboard artist, with Joseph Baptista helping with the storyboarding and also helping with some of the character designs. Animator Elana Pritchard was also hired to contribute a sequence in January 2014. British illustrator Ian Miller was hired to help with the background art for the film; Miller had previously worked with Baskhi on Wizards and Cool World.

== Release ==
Last Days of Coney Island premiered on Bakshi's 77th birthday on October 29, 2015 on Vimeo. Bakshi released the film for free on YouTube on October 13, 2016.
