= A Turtle's Tale 2: Sammy's Escape from Paradise =

- U.S. DVD cover
- Directed by: Vincent Kesteloot; Ben Stassen
- Screenplay by: Domonic Paris
- Produced by: Gina Gallo; Mimi Maynard; Dominic Paris; Ben Stassen; Caroline Van Iseghem
- Starring: Alan Shearman; Khary Payton; Kaitlyn Maher; Carter Hastings; Dino Andrade; Alanna Ubach; Grey DeLisle; Camille Labadie; Bridget Hoffman; Bill Parks; Carlos Alazraqui; Joe J. Thomas; Eric Bauza
- Music by: Ramin Djawadi
- Production companies: nWave Pictures; Illuminata Pictures; Motion Investment Group; BNP Paribas Fortis Film Fund; Le Tax Shelter du Gouvernement Fédéral de Belgique uFilm
- Distributed by: Belga Films; StudioCanal
- Release date: 15 August 2012
- Running time: 93 minutes
- Countries: Belgium; France; Italy
- Language: English
- Box office: $49,261,830

A Turtle's Tale 2: Sammy's Escape from Paradise (titled Sammy's Great Escape in the UK, Sammy 2: Escape from Paradise everywhere else; Dutch: Sammy's avonturen 2, literally "Sammy's adventures 2") is a 2012 animated film sequel to the 2010 animated film A Turtle's Tale: Sammy's Adventures. The sequel features the voice talents of Kaitlyn Maher, Khary Payton and Carlos Alazraqui.

== Plot ==
Sammy and Ray are supervising their new grandchildren, when seagulls attack them and both Sammy and Ray and two of their grandchildren Ella and Ricky are captured on trawler net. While Ella and Ricky are separated and sent to the seabed, Sammy and Ray are taken to an aquarium with Lulu, a crazy lobster and Jimbo a bug-eyed blobfish. Escape plans are run and tried by the leading seahorse Big D. Ella and Ricky set out with Annabel and Margaret, the pink octopus mother and daughter in order to rescue their grandfathers, getting chased by a pair of barracudas when they get there. After much communication trouble, Ella and Ricky interpret from Sammy that in order to escape the aquarium several squids expel ink into the ventilation system, while all the aquarium inhabitants play dead. Before initiating the escape plan, Sammy and Ray get the tyrannical Big D out of the way. The reluctant aquarium manager opens the emergency doors allowing all sea creatures out to freedom.

== Cast ==
- Alan Shearman as Sammy, an elderly Green sea turtle who is Shelly's husband and Ella's grandfather.
- Khary Payton (Thomas Lee) as Ray, an elderly Leatherback sea turtle who is Rita's husband and Ricky's grandfather.
- Kaitlyn Maher as Ella, a baby Green sea turtle who is Shelly and Sammy's granddaughter.
- Carter Hastings as Ricky, a baby Leatherback sea turtle who is Rita and Ray's grandson.
- Dino Andrade as Manuel, Spanish-accented hogfish, the Consuelo's husband.
- Alanna Ubach as Consuelo, a hogfish, who is Manuel's wife and Rosie a female elderly Magellanic penguin.
- Carlos Alazraqui as Big D, a villainous Barbour's seahorse who acts as a leader to the tank's inhabitants and Maurice, a male elderly Magellanic penguin.
- Camille Labadie as Annabel, a pink baby octopus.
- Bridget Hoffman as Margaret, Annabel's mother.
- Joe J. Thomas as Lulu, a crazy lobster.
- Jeff Dunham (Bill Parks) as Jimbo, a blobfish.
- Jaylen Ahmadyar as Manager.

=== Additional voices ===
- Cinda Adams as Veterinarian
- Robin Atkin Downes as Diver
- Roxanne Reese as Rita an Leatherback sea turtle who is Ray's wife and Ricky's grandmother
- Grey DeLisle as Shelly, a Green sea turtle who is Sammy's wife and Ella's grandmother
- Cam Clarke as Seagull 1
- Kyle Hebert as Seagull 2
- Douglas Ryan Roth as Seagull 3
- Lex Lang as Big Frenchman
- Michael McConnohie as Security Guard
- Mari Devon as Female Patron 1 (American Woman)
- Keegan Cameron Thomas as Female Patron 1's Son (American Boy)
- Elisa Gabrielli as Female Patron 2
- Joey D'Auria as Marco, a French-accented Green moray who is one of Big D's henchmen
- John Kassir as Phillippe a French-accented Green moray who is one of the Big D's henchmen as well as Seagull 4
- Darren Capozzi as Tremaine
- Eric Bauza and Jimmy Zoppi as a pair of unnamed Rayfish brothers who attempted to escape from the tank by hadding inside of a dolphin's mouth, but they ended up eaten by barracudas.
- Patrick Seitz as Toots an joking clownfish
- Sam Riegel as Jax an stonefish who feels stressed about human tourists staring at him
- Lara Cody as an unnamed yellow tang who is Big D's girlfriend
- Doug Stone as Albert an Hammerhead shark
- Chris Ciulla & Jon Ferrante as Russian Snowcrabs
- Terri Douglas as Little Fish (Cuttlefish)
- Willie James Warren Jr. and Mario Anthony as Jamaican Fishermen
- Domonic Paris as Large Fisherman
- Michael Sun Lee as Japanese Fisherman

=== Home media ===
This film was released on Blu-ray and DVD in the US in July 9, 2013 by Vivendi Entertainment.

== Soundtrack ==
The soundtrack for the film includes various songs by various artists, including the musical score for the film from Ramin Djawadi. American country singer Darius Rucker contributed the song "True Believers", which is included in the original soundtrack and the North American direct-to-video release of the film. Greyson Chance's song "Stranded" is instead heard in the releases of the film outside of the US and Canada.

The song Hello was sung by Martin Solveig and Dragonette.

No.	Title	Length
1.	"Stranded" (Greyson Chance)	3:44
2.	"Rock El Casbah" (Rachid Taha)	4:33
3.	"Tequila" (The Champs)	2:12
4.	"Tu Vuò Fà L'Americano" (Renato Carosone)	3:27
5.	"Rock Lobster" (The B-52's)	6:50
6.	"Atlantic" (Givers)	4:54
7.	"Working Together" (Gonzales)	3:16
8.	"Free Drinks"	1:21
9.	"Sammy's Adventures"	1:44
10.	"Trapped in a Loony Bin"	1:25
11.	"Oil Plan"	2:14
12.	"Escape Attempt"	2:32
13.	"I'm the Boss"	1:11
14.	"Showtime"	2:09
15.	"Bird Attack"	1:48
16.	"Barracuda Chase"	2:44
17.	"The Big Escape"	2:10
18.	"True Believers" (Darius Rucker)	4:13
Total length:		49:07

== Reception ==
Unlike its predecessor, the film received negative reviews from critics. On the review aggregator website Rotten Tomatoes, 20% of ten critics' reviews are positive, with an average rating of 4/10.
