= Joey Camen =

American actor (born 1957)

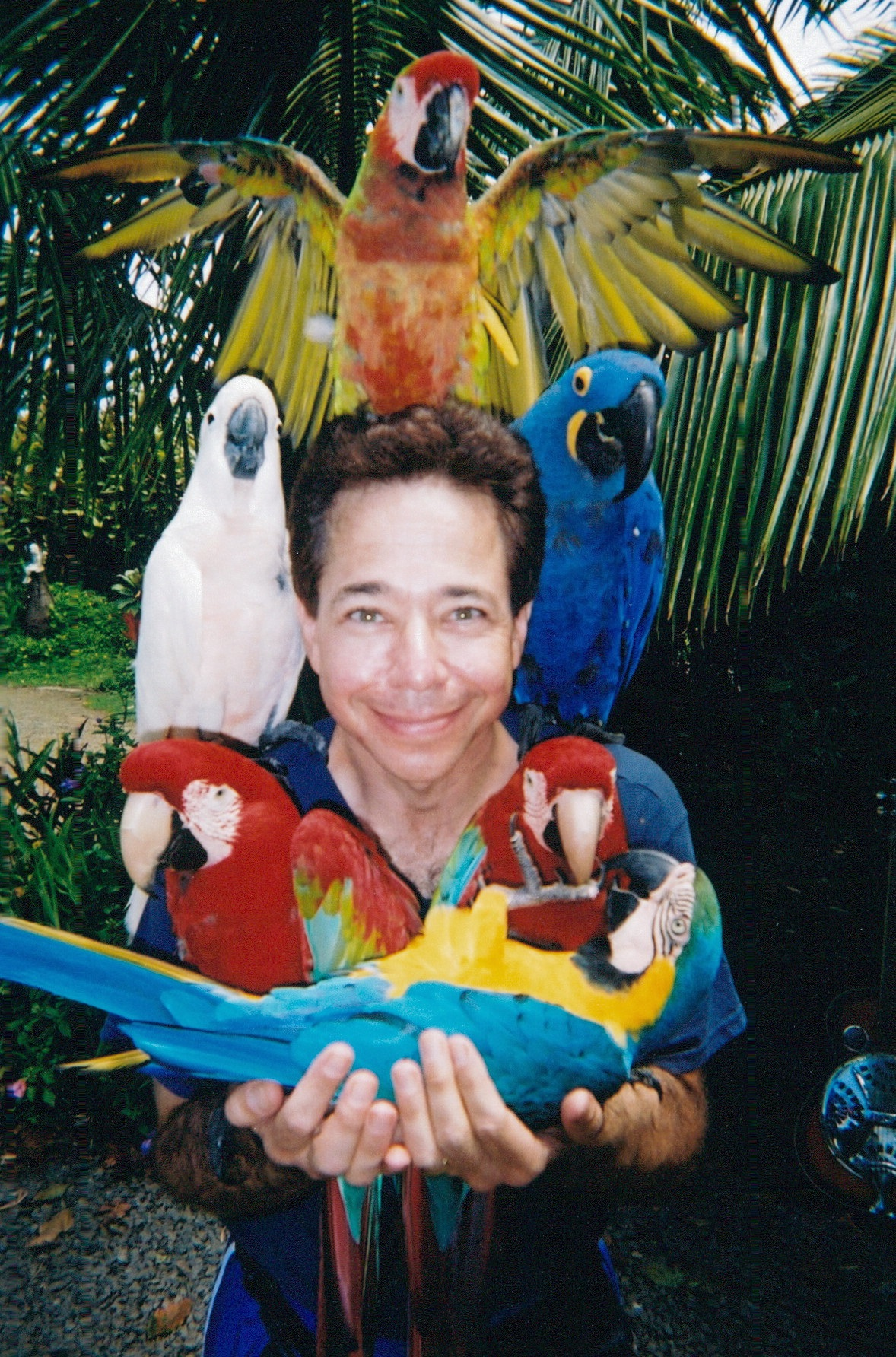
- Camen in 2015
- Born: January 16, 1957 (age 69)
- Other name: Joseph Camen
- Occupations: Standup comedian; actor; writer; filmmaker; author
- Years active: 1977–present
- Website: voicecomic.com

Joey Camen (born January 16, 1957) is an American voice actor, comedian and writer who has performed voice over work in various movies, TV shows and video games.

== Biography ==
In 1974, after graduating from Henry Ford High School in Detroit, Camen went to Hollywood, California. He auditioned at the Comedy Store on the Sunset Strip, and within a few weeks, he was a regular performer and master of ceremonies, making him one of the youngest professional standup comedians at the time. His standup act featured various dialects along with characters he created based on the people he grew up with in multi-ethnic Detroit. He was then discovered and mentored by voiceover artist Daws Butler, who voiced the characters of Yogi Bear, Huckleberry Hound, Quick Draw McGraw and others.

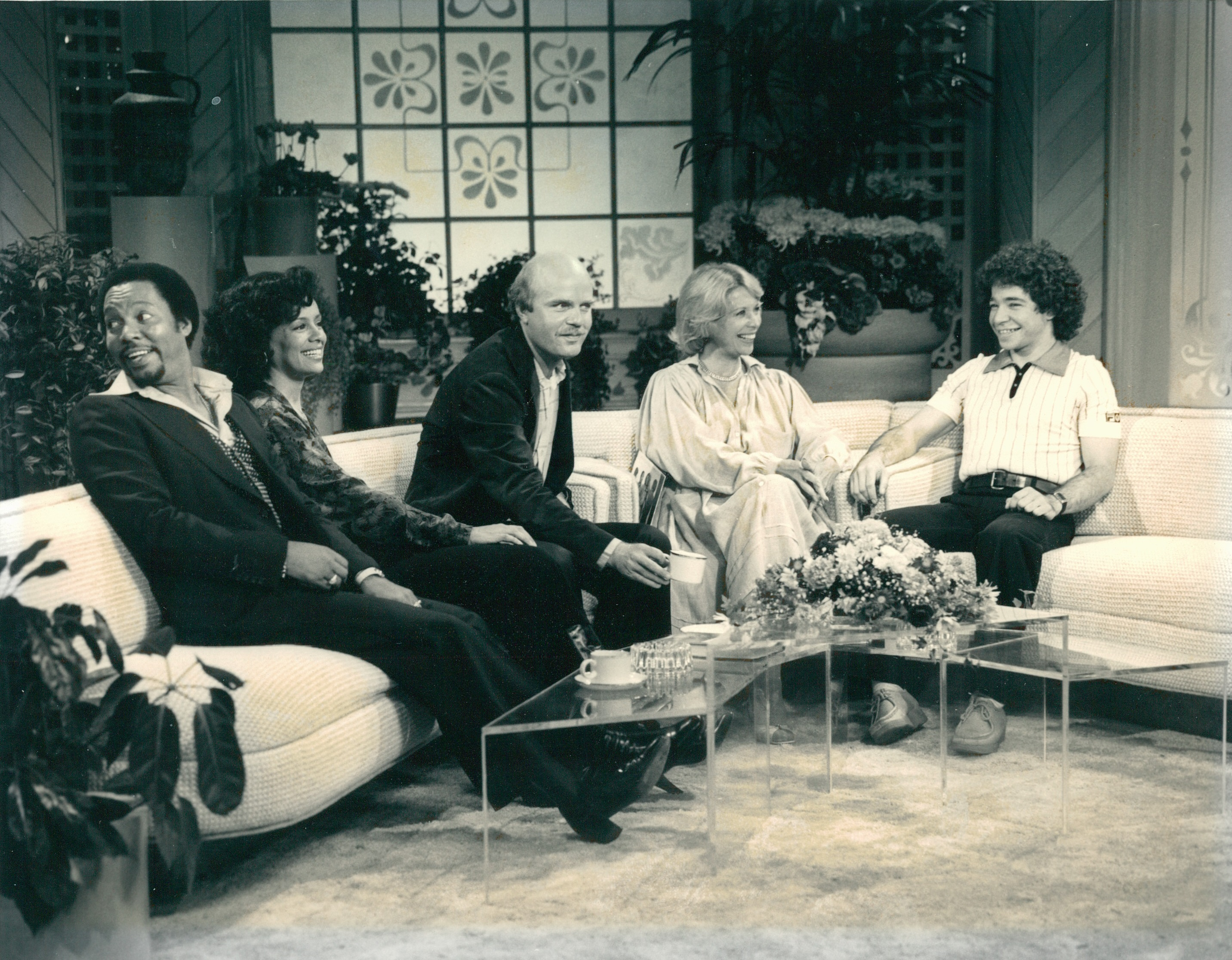
Joey Camen on Dinah! television series

Camen got his first break at 20 performing his standup comedy routines on national TV shows Don Kirshner's Rock Concert and later on Dinah, the daytime talk show starring Dinah Shore. He was also the opening act for such performers as Oingo Boingo, The Pointer Sisters, Richard Pryor, Marvin Gaye and others. In addition to being a regular performer at the Comedy Store for more than 25 years, Camen has headlined at comedy venues in Las Vegas and comedy clubs and colleges across the United States.

As a voice-over actor, Camen has worked on multiple projects over the years, including video games Devil May Cry 5, Skylanders: Giants, Transformers: Dark of the Moon and Mafia II; the online series Sam & Max, where he voiced two seasons as Bosco and the entire Jimmy 2 Teeth family.

He has voiced multiple characters on animated family films such as The Queen's Corgi, The Son of Bigfoot, Thunder and the House of Magic, and Space Jam. Camen has also voiced spots for various TV and radio commercials and was the voice of Natural Smurf in the Hanna-Barbera TV series, The Smurfs. In addition, Camen is the designated voice of McGruff the Crime Dog for a series of videos shown in public schools throughout the United States and PSA commercials.

As an actor, Camen's first job was as a sketch player on the short-lived NBC variety series, The Richard Pryor Show, where he performed sketches alongside Richard Pryor and other cast members. Then as a pledge in Floyd Mutrux's The Hollywood Knights, and next co-starring in the PBS television series, The Righteous Apples, for 2 seasons as Samuel 'DC' Rosencrantz. This led to working with Ralph Bakshi on the films American Pop and Cool World, as well as guest roles in sitcoms and other feature films.

In 1994, Camen wrote and performed a serio-comic one-person, two-act play, In the Hood with Mrs. Aronovitz, portraying nine characters. In the play, an ungrateful son tricks his elderly mother out of the deed to her apartment building to tear it down and put up a parking lot. Mrs. Aronovitz and her tenants rally together to get the building back. The play had a successful run in theatres in Los Angeles and New York City.

Camen's filmmaking credits include the Houston International Film Festival Bronze Award-Winning comedy short Bernie - A Love Story about a man and his mattress, in which he worn multiple hats as writer-director-producer and actor. Camen has also directed various YouTube videos for his comedy channel CamenTV.

Joey Camen was criticized by video game fans who viewed his YouTube channel Camen TV in where he played various stereotypes. The videos, posted between 2015 and 2017, were taken down by Camen in 2019.

== Literature ==
Camen has written two non-fiction books. The 2013 pet memoir, My Life with Snoopy: How One Shelter Dog's Love Changed a Man's Life and Other Tails of Adventure, tells the story of his 13-year relationship with his Burbank Animal Shelter dog, Snoopy. In 2017, Camen's autobiography, Laughing Through the Pain: Stories from the Trenches of Hollywood Standup Comedy and Beyond, was released.

== Filmography ==
=== Animation ===
- American Pop - Freddie
- Becca's Bunch - Buck, MJ
- Cool World - Interrogator #1, Slash, Holli's door
- Creepy Crawlers - Chris Carter
- Darkwing Duck - Stegmutt
- Dink, the Little Dinosaur - Additional voices
- Iznogoud - Additional voices
- Jason and the Heroes of Mount Olympus - Additional voices
- Last Days of Coney Island -
- Little Dracula - Werebunny
- Little Wizards - Various voices
- Monster Island - Shiro, Fergus, Mayor's Assistant
- My Little Pony - Weston the Baby Eagle
- Phantom Boy - Le géant
- Problem Child - Additional voices
- Robinson Crusoe - Scrubby
- Shirt Tales - Additional voices
- Space Jam - Monstar Bang
- Spicy City - Max
- Strange Frame: Love & Sax - Police Officer (uncredited)
- Superman - Short Henchman
- The Glo Friends - Unknown voice/s
- The House of Magic - Chihuahua
- The Queen's Corgi - Tyson, Al
- The Smurfs - Natural Smurf (Adult)
- The Son of Bigfoot - Principal Jones
- The Swan Princess II: Escape from Castle Mountain - Knuckles
- What-a-Mess - Additional voices

=== Video games ===
Year	Title	Role	Notes
2006	Bone: The Great Cow Race	Euclid	
2006	Sam & Max Save the World	Bosco, Jimmy Two-Teeth	
2006	Sam & Max Beyond Time and Space	Bosco, Jimmy Two-Teeth, Mary Two-Teeth, Timmy Two-Teeth	
2007	Fantastic Four: Rise of the Silver Surfer	Ben Grimm/The Thing	
2009	Brütal Legend	Kabbage Boy Bassist, Bouncers	
2010	Mafia II	Leon, Gangsters, Civilians	
2011	Transformers: Dark of the Moon - The Game	Lockdown	Nintendo DS port
2014	How to Train Your Dragon: School of Dragons	Headmaster	
2019	Fallout 76: Wild Appalachia	Ansel Abrahms, Cavit Klein	
2019	Devil May Cry 5	J.D. Morrison, Goliath	

- 3-D Dinosaur Adventure - Additional voices
- America's Next Top Model - Additional voices
- Asura's Wrath - Taison
- Champions Online - Armadillo, Mechaniste
- Command & Conquer: Red Alert 3 - Imperial Tsunami Tank & Allied Javelin Soldier (uncredited)
- Drakensang: The Dark Eye - Merwin Goodbeet, Merchants, Soldiers, Guards
- EverQuest II - Additional voices
- EverQuest II: Desert of Flames - Additional voices
- Gothic 3 - Additional voices
- Guardians of Middle-earth - Additional voices (as Joseph Camen)
- Guild Wars - additional voices
- Hitman: Absolution - Chester the Bum, Landlord (uncredited)
- Jade Empire - Additional voices
- Men of Valor - White Marine 2, Pilot
- Saints Row - Stilwater's Resident
- Shattered Steel - Additional voices
- Skylanders: Giants - Terrafin, additional voices
- Skylanders: Imaginators - Terrafin, Free Ranger, additional voices
- Skylanders: SuperChargers - Terrafin, Free Ranger, additional voices
- Skylanders: Swap Force - Terrafin, Free Ranger, additional voices
- Skylanders: Trap Team - Terrafin, Free Ranger, additional voices
- Superman Returns - Additional voices
- The Sopranos: Road to Respect - Additional voices
- Tony Hawk's American Wasteland - Additional voices
- Tournament of Legends - Additional voices
- Transformers: Dark of the Moon - Additional voices
- Ultimate Spider-Man - Additional voices

=== Live-action ===
- Adventures in Voice Acting - Himself
- Auditions - Black - White Man
- Can I Do It 'Till I Need Glasses? - Himself
- Fairy Tales - Little Dutch Boy
- Growing Pains - Slash
- King of the Mountain - Suds
- Project A - Additional voices
- Rock Concert - Himself
- The Hollywood Knights - Pledge
- The Richard Pryor Show - Various, White Guy Who Wants to Be Black
- The Righteous Apples - Samuel 'DC' Rosencrantz
- The Steve Harvey Show - Himself

=== Anime ===
- Black Jack - GNN Newscaster
- Black Jack: The Movie - GNN Newscaster
- Dinozaurs - Dino Tricera
- El Hazard: The Magnificent World - Walla
- Eureka Seven - Dr. Greg Egan
- Ghost in the Shell: S.A.C. 2nd GIG - Additional voices
- Ghost in the Shell: Stand Alone Complex - Watanabe
- Phantom Boy - The Big Guy
- Samurai Champloo - Kuroihara, Kogoro

=== Shorts ===
- Last Days of Coney Island - Men
- My Secret Friend: A Guardian Angel Story - Additional voices (as Reed Waxman)
