= The House of Magic =

2013 animated film by Ben Stassen

- Theatrical release poster
- Directed by: Jeremy Degruson; Ben Stassen
- Screenplay by: James Flynn; Dominic Paris; Ben Stassen
- Story by: Ben Stassen
- Produced by: Nadia Khamlichi; Adrian Politowski; Ben Stassen; Caroline Van Iseghem; Gilles Waterkeyn
- Starring: Cinda Adams; George Babbit; Murray Blue; Kathleen Browers; Joey Camen; Grant George; Shanelle Gray; Nina Grillo; Kyle Hebert; Goldie Jonsie; Kendra Leif; Joey Lotsko; Millie Mup; Will Parks; Sage Sommer; Michael Sorich; Doug Stone; Joseph W. Terry
- Music by: Ramin Djawadi
- Production companies: nWave Pictures; Anton Capital Entertainment; uMedia
- Distributed by: Belga Films (Belgium); StudioCanal (France and United Kingdom)
- Release date: 25 December 2013
- Running time: 85 minutes
- Countries: Belgium; France
- Language: English
- Budget: $34 million
- Box office: $64.2 million

The House of Magic (Thunder and The House of Magic in the United States. French: Le Manoir magique) is a 2013 animated fantasy comedy film produced by Nadia Khamlichi, Adrian Politowski, Ben Stassen, Caroline Van Iseghem and Gilles Waterkeyn and directed by Stassen and Jeremy Degruson (in his directorial debut). The film focuses on an abandoned young cat who seeks shelter in the home of an old, retired magician with his robots and gizmos.

A spin-off TV series called Presto! School of Magic (formerly School of Magic) was announced in 2017. The series was produced by TeamTO and Federation Kids and Family.

== Plot ==
While moving to a new home in Boston, a tabby cat is left behind by his owners. Abandoned, he looks for a refuge. After various obstacles and near accidents, he comes to an old house with fame for being cursed or haunted in the neighborhood. As he enters, he meets the house's owner, Mr. Lawrence, a kindly old magician, and his pets and automations, along with a small mouse named Maggie, her grumpy rabbit friend named Jack, and an electrical bulb-headed robot named Edison. Later, the magician's materialist real estate agent nephew, Daniel, drops by for a visit. Afterward, Lawrence notices the cat, and decides to adopt him, naming him Thunder (after his fear of lightning).

Thunder learns more about the house, as well as the romantic pigeon pair named Carlo and Carla. Meanwhile, Jack and Maggie try in all ways to exile Thunder from the house, jealous and afraid of being substituted. The next day, refusing to be left behind, Thunder is incorporated into the "rabbit out of a hat" routine in the magic show performed for some children at a hospital, to much fanfare. Whilst returning home, Lawrence suffers an accident and is sent to the hospital, as Thunder is left sprawled behind.

With Lawrence in the hospital with a broken leg, his nephew Daniel takes advantage by tricking his uncle to sign over power of attorney, in the hopes of putting his house up for sale. Suspicious of Daniel's intentions, Thunder alerts Lawrence's automatons. When Daniel returns to his uncle's magic trunk home, he brings along two possible buyers for the property. Desperate, Thunder gets Carlo and Carla to attempt to deter and prevent the house from being sold. Meanwhile, once out of the trunk, Jack (who broke his leg in the accident) and Maggie convince the automatons (except Edison) of Thunder's guilt in causing the accident despite Thunder trying to tell the truth. He hopes Carlo and Carla will prove his innocence, which fails when they are intimidated by Jack. Nevertheless, Thunder manages to convince everyone that they need him to save the house since Daniel is proven to be severely allergic to cats. They allow him to stay but lock him in a birdcage. The next possible buyer, a Chihuahua's owner, is also driven away but not before the Chihuahua can rescue Thunder. In a misunderstanding, Daniel is assumed to be harming her dog, whilst attempting to trap the cat. Later, Thunder visits Lawrence at the hospital and is pleased to discover Lawrence never blamed him after all. Thunder returns home and the inhabitants of the house have meanwhile driven two more buyers away believing the house to be haunted.

When Lawrence rushes back from the hospital with the help of some of the children he met there and finds his nephew swinging a wrecking ball, he finally discovers Daniel's true colors. Thunder attempts to save all the automatons from getting crushed, and when he saves Maggie's life, Thunder finally earns the mouse's respect and friendship. They band together and are able to subdue Daniel. Thunder is finally accepted as a member of the family by Jack and Maggie. When Lawrence recovers from his injuries, he returns to entertaining children with his magic shows, in which Thunder now has his starring part alongside Jack and Maggie. Thunder is finally happy to have a family that appreciates him and his Chihuahua friend seeing them all having so much fun attempts to get himself "an audition" to get recruited as part of the team.

== Voice cast ==
- Brianne Siddall (credited as Murray Blue) as Thunder / Dylan
- George Babbit as Jack / Carlo / Zoltar
- Cinda Adams as Nurse Baxter
- Kathleen Browers as Carla
- Joey Camen as Chihuahua
- Grant George as Daniel
- Shanelle Gray as Maggie
- Nina Grillo as Audrey
- Kyle Hebert as Mark Matthews
- Goldie Jonsie as Old Lady
- Kendra Leif as Lasondra
- Joey Lotsko as Mr. Eames
- Millie Mup as Mrs. Eames
- Will Parks as Mike Matthews
- Sage Sommer as Izzy
- Michael Sorich as Crane Operator
- Doug Stone as Lawrence Savile
- Joseph W. Terry as Reggie Willis

== Reception ==
=== Critical response ===
On Rotten Tomatoes, the film has a score of 73% based on reviews from 30 critics, with an average rating of 5.97/10. The website's critics consensus reads: "Thunder and the House of Magic lacks real narrative depth, but its visual splendor offers sufficient compensation for younger viewers." At Metacritic, which assigns a weighted average score out of 100 to reviews from mainstream critics, the film received an average score of 47 based on 13 reviews, indicating "mixed or average reviews".

=== Box office ===
The film grossed $64,193,114 overseas outside of North America as well as $4,091 within it for a combined gross of $64,197,205.
