= Ben Stassen =

Belgian film director, producer, and screenwriter

- Born: 1959 (age 66-67); Aubel, Belgium
- Occupations: Film director, film producer
- Years active: 1988–present
- Known for: Fly Me to the Moon; A Turtle's Tale: Sammy's Adventures; A Turtle's Tale 2: Sammy's Escape from Paradise; The House of Magic; Robinson Crusoe; The Son of Bigfoot; The Queen's Corgi; Bigfoot Family

Ben Stassen is a Belgian film director, producer, and screenwriter.

== Career ==
Stassen founded nWave Pictures in 1994, producing CG ride films including Devil's Mine. Starting in 1997, Stassen began focusing on large-format films, directing Thrill Ride: The Science of Fun and Alien Adventure. In the late 1990s, Stassen directed a succession of 3-D large-format films, including Encounter in the Third Dimension and Haunted Castle.

In 2005, Stassen produced and directed Wild Safari 3D, the first 3-D wildlife film for the giant screen.

Stassen's first feature-length animated film, Fly Me to the Moon, was released in North America on 15 August 2008 on both regular-size and IMAX screens, exclusively in 3-D. According to nWave, Fly Me to the Moon was the first animated film to be designed, created, and released solely in 3-D. The film was originally announced for the spring or summer of 2007.

It was released in 2010 as A Turtle's Tale: Sammy's Adventures. Further animated features directed or co-directed by Stassen include A Turtle's Tale 2: Sammy's Escape from Paradise (2012), The House of Magic (2013), The Wild Life (2016) and The Son of Bigfoot (2017).

The Queen's Corgi, the 7th feature animated project from Stassen, was released in 2019.

== Filmography ==
=== Short films ===
- Special Effects: Anything Can Happen (1996)
- Thrill Ride: The Science of Fun (1997)
- Alien Adventure (1999)
- Encounter in the Third Dimension (1999)
- Haunted Castle (2001)
- SOS Planet (2002)
- Misadventures in 3D (2003)
- Haunted House (2004)
- Wild Safari 3D (2005)
- African Adventure: Safari in the Okavango (2007)
- Pirate Story (2011)

=== Feature films ===
- Fly Me to the Moon (2008)
- A Turtle's Tale: Sammy's Adventures (2010)
- A Turtle's Tale 2: Sammy's Escape from Paradise (2012)
- The House of Magic (2013)
- Robinson Crusoe (2016) (Released as The Wild Life in North America.)
- The Son of Bigfoot (2017)
- The Queen's Corgi (2019)
- Bigfoot Family (2020)
- Chickenhare and the Hamster of Darkness (2022)
