= Haunted House (2004 film) =

- Haunted House film poster
- Directed by: Ben Stassen
- Produced by: nWave Pictures
- Release date: 2004
- Running time: 13 minutes
- Language: English

Haunted House (also known as Haunted House Forever) is a 2004 animated short film that is shown in 4D cinemas. The short is a light-fright, non-violent adventure film.

== Plot ==
Official Summary: You see the world from the eyes of a black cat that walks around in a moonlit night. Later the cat enters an old spooky house. Everything looks perfectly normal. But wait, did those toys actually move?

The short begins with a black cat approaching a large, dilapidated manor. Climbing up a tree it enters the attic and stops for a nap. It's awakened by an owl, which it follows as it encounters a nest of rats. Heading through the broken floorboards, the cat drops down into a bedroom, where it encounters a ghostly, skeletal skull. It then awakens a guard dog, which transforms into a ghostly demon. The demon dogs chase it down into the main atrium, where the cat retreats down the master staircase and finds refuge in a toy room, which some living toys welcome it. The cat explores the room, avoiding various toys that stalk it and try to cause it harm. At the windowsill, the cat sees an animate vine coming from the greenhouse outside the manor, and it inadvertently saves the cat from a group of dolls attempting to take it. The vine carries the cat down to the greenhouse, where it's almost eaten by a carnivorous plant monster, but makes its escape. Traveling underground, the cat emerges into a graveyard, in which after seeing a particular grave the undead inhabitants start to come to life, with the ghost dog catching up to the cat and seemingly pass through it, which causes all of the ghosts and monsters disappear. Exiting the graveyard back at the front of the manor, the cat sees its reflection and realizes that it's become a ghost too.

== See also ==
- 4D film
- Haunted Castle (2001 film)
