= Haunted Castle (2001 film) =

2001 film by Ben Stassen

- Directed by: Ben Stassen
- Written by: Ben Stassen; Kurt Frey
- Produced by: Ben Stassen; Charlotte Clay Huggins
- Starring: Jasper Steverlinck; Kyoko Baertsoen; Harry Shearer
- Cinematography: Kommer Kleijn
- Edited by: Ben Stassen
- Music by: Arid; Lunascape; Metal Molly; Giuseppe Verdi
- Distributed by: Ventura Distribution nWave Pictures
- Release date: February 23, 2001
- Running time: 38 minutes
- Countries: Belgium; United States
- Language: English
- Box office: $13,651,656

Haunted Castle is a 2001 animated horror film in IMAX theaters. The film is rated PG and is computer-animated with 3D effects.

Written by Kurt Frey and directed by co-writer Ben Stassen, the film plays out very much like many modern video games, and can be divided into two types of segments: those in which the audience is seeing through the eyes of the main character, and those in which a scene plays out where the main character is actually in the shot.

== Plot ==
A young, aspiring American musician and singer named Johnny has been notified by a British law firm that his mother, an aging rock star whom Johnny hasn't seen or heard from since he was 3 years old, has died in a helicopter accident. Johnny has been willed her castle and all of her property and money, but he must visit the actual estate, located in England, to claim these things. As he drives up to the castle, a lightning bolt hits a grave on the castle grounds, and a glowing sphere emerges.

As Johnny enters the building, he walks through a hall with several suits of armor. The suits come alive and begin attacking him when suddenly a demonic entity speeds in, destroys the suits and beckons Johnny further into the castle. Johnny stumbles on a room of instruments levitating and playing on themselves, and then walks into a great hall with an orb embedded into the ground that begins projecting the image of Johnny's mother. (This segues into a rather lengthy musical number in which this holographic image (Baertsoen) sings an operatic number while the cameras circle around her. The song is named 'Lane Navachi' from Lunascape's album 'Reflecting Seylence').

Suddenly, a demonic face appears in the fire. It is the Devil (referred to as "Mr. D"), who explains to Johnny that his mother sold her soul for her fame. Part of the agreement was that the devil could "not touch" Johnny, but now that she has died, Mr. D offers Johnny a similar agreement. Johnny declines, but is enticed to explore the castle further. He enters a cathedral-like room, whose floor begins to descend. Soon, Johnny is in Hell proper. At this point, the film begins to take a very dark and gothic turn, as Johnny's tour guide, Mr. D's chief lieutenant Mephisto, guides him through the sections of Hell where musicians who have sold their souls are violently tortured. Mephisto reveals that there was a time when luring people to Hell with fame in music was unsuccessful - until the invention of Rock and Roll.

Johnny is taken on a roller coaster ride through Hell, but as he proceeds, the glowing sphere - revealed to be the spirit of his mother - appears before him every now and then, warning him of the danger awaiting him should he give in to the Devil's offer. Eventually, Johnny is sidetracked into a decrepit opera hall, where the worst of tortures are taking place. Mephisto reveals to Johnny that Mr. D once had a romance with an opera singer, who broke his heart, and now Mr. D has a particularly violent aversion for opera music.

Johnny eventually ends up back in front of Mr. D, who once again entices him to sign. Mephisto gives Johnny a guitar, and he considers the offer, then throws the guitar into the flames and begins to sing La Donna è Mobile at the top of his lungs, sending the Devil into a frenzied tantrum which collapses the entire castle. As this occurs, the soul of Johnny's mother returns to its resting place once more.

The film jumps ahead six months later, and we see that Johnny is now a famous rock and roll star through his own talent. The last five minutes of the film features a performance by Arid, as the credits float by them in little bubbles burst by a floating demon.

== Cast ==
- Jasper Steverlinck as Johnny. Steverlinck is the singer of the Belgian rock band Arid.
- Kyoko Baertsoen as Johnny's mother. Baertsoen is the leader of another Belgian band, Lunascape.
- Harry Shearer as "Mr. D" and Mephisto

== Soundtracks ==
The following Soundtracks were played in the film Haunted Castle

All tracks are written by Arid, Lunascape, Metal Molly and Piet Goddaer.

No.	Title	Writer(s)	Performer	Length
1.	"Little Things of Venom"	Arid	Arid	4:30
2.	"Lane Navachi"	Lunascape	Lunascape	3:41
3.	"Yairo"	Lunascape	Lunascape	3:08
4.	"Let Yer Tractor Beam"	Metal Molly	Metal Molly
5.	"Donna Mobile" (From the opera Rigoletto. Music & Lyrics by Giuseppe Verdi)	Piet Goddaer	Jasper Steverlinck	2:50

== See also ==
- Haunted House (short film)
