= José Rodrigues dos Santos =

Portuguese journalist and novelist

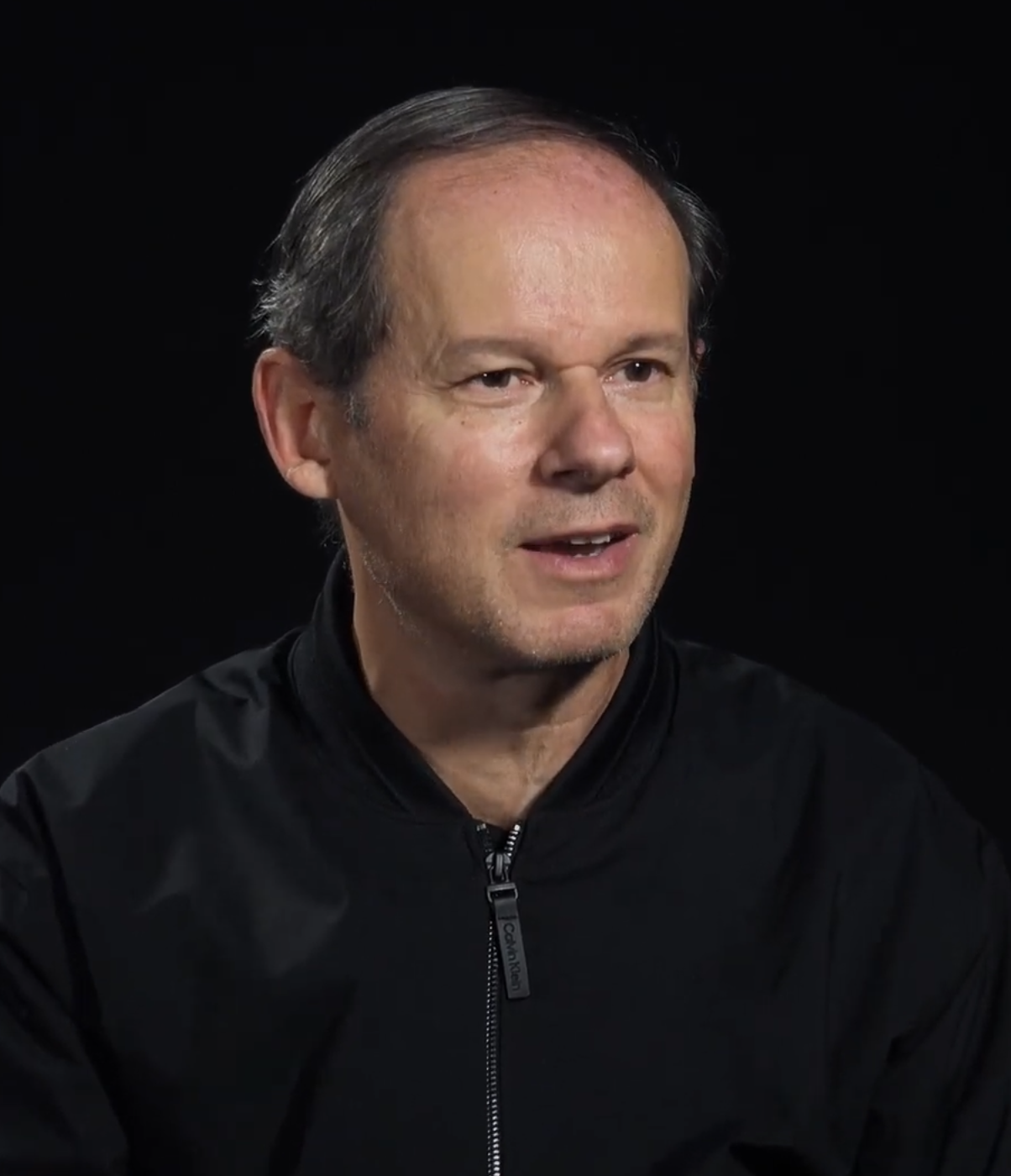
- Rodrigues dos Santos in 2024
- Born: 1 April 1964 (age 62); Beira, Overseas Province of Mozambique, Portugal
- Occupations: journalist, university lecturer and novelist
- Spouse: Florbela Cardoso (1988-present)
- Children: 2
- Writing career
- Genres: Novel, historical fiction
- Notable works: A Fórmula de Deus, Fúria Divina
- Website: www.joserodriguesdossantos.com

José António Afonso Rodrigues dos Santos (born 1 April 1964) is a Portuguese journalist, novelist and university lecturer. He has been one of the presenters of Telejornal, the evening news program on the Portuguese public television channel RTP1, since 1991. Since the 2000s he has published several thriller and historical fiction novels, becoming a best-selling author in Portugal.

== Life and career ==
José Rodrigues dos Santos was born in the city of Beira, Overseas Province of Mozambique, a Portuguese territory at that time, and lived most of his childhood in Tete, Overseas Province of Mozambique. He is the eldest of two sons of Medical Doctor José da Paz Brandão Rodrigues dos Santos (Penafiel, 13 October 1930 – January 1986) and wife Maria Manuela de Campos Afonso Matos. Dos Santos lived in Portugal after the events that led to the independence of Mozambique in 1975 and the eruption of the Mozambican Civil War in 1977. Firstly, the family fled to Lisbon, then after the divorce of his parents, he lived with his mother. As a result of his mother's financial difficulties, he was raised by his father in Penafiel, and then Macau, then a Portuguese territory. Rodrigues dos Santos went back to Lisbon in 1983 to study at the New University of Lisbon.

In 1988, he married his wife Florbela Cardoso, daughter of Dulce Cardoso and an unknown father, with whom he has two daughters, Catarina and Inês Cardoso Rodrigues dos Santos.

Formerly a reporter for the BBC, he has covered more than a dozen wars, teaches journalism at the New University of Lisbon, and anchors the Telejornal of Rádio e Televisão de Portugal (RTP), of which he became the Director of Programs. He has also won many awards, including the Golden Globes.

In 2007 he published a book O Sétimo Selo (in English, The Seventh Seal), which has sold 140,000 copies.

== Controversies ==
José Rodrigues dos Santos publicly announced he does not vote, “to remain independent”, but nevertheless has become involved in several controversies.

In 2004 with the center-right government of PSD/CDS. He was then the Head of News for RTP and minister Morais Sarmento accused him of behaving as if he was totally independent and said RTP's independence “must have limits”. Two weeks later, the government-appointed RTP Board selected the 4th placed in an internal process to choose the new RTP correspondent in Madrid. José resigned as Head of News, alleging “interference in the editorial process”. The official media watchdog, AACS, inquired the affair and concluded there had been indeed “illegitimate interference”. In 2007, José repeated the same accusation and the RTP Board tried to fire him. An internal enquiry concluded there were no legal grounds for such an action. In 2009, José published a novel, The Last Secret, where he explained discoveries by historians that contradicted the Church's portrayal of Jesus Christ. The Portuguese Church accused him of “intolerance”. He responded, stressing that the Church “did not deny any of the facts” presented in the book.

In March 2014, Rodrigues dos Santos was criticized by Socialists for confronting José Sócrates. The Socialist politician had introduced austerity in Portugal in 2010 when he was prime-minister and criticized austerity when he went to the opposition, a contradiction José chose not to ignore. Sócrates was later arrested on corruption and tax-fraud charges. On 24 January 2015, José reported from Athens on the internal causes of the Greek crisis, and pointed to four factors: big corruption (the example he gave was the luxury house of the Defense minister arrested over the submarines affair), petty corruption (the subsidies given to “many Greeks” who had bribed doctors to get an illegitimate paralysis declaration that entitled them to subsidies), an over-generous Social State (the “holidays for all” program) and massive tax evasion (the swimming pools scheme). A left-wing MP, José Manuel Pureza, accused him of generalizations for saying “Greeks” pretended they were paralytic to get subsidies. José responded, saying he had not said “all”, but “many”, and insisting that “many Greeks” indeed bribed doctors to get subsidies they were not entitled to, claiming this had been ascertained by the Greek government and by Transparency International, an anti-corruption NGO. Two enquiries, by the Viewers Ombudsman and by the official media watchdog ERC, found no grounds in the accusations.

On 7 October 2015, the journalist was accused by the Socialist Party of making a homophobic comment as he switched the masculine form "eleito" to the feminine "eleita" when introducing a news story about the oldest MP elected to the new parliament. Rodrigues dos Santos said the reporter informed him that the oldest MP in the new parliament was a woman MP of 69, when in fact it was a gay MP of 70, and apologized for mistaking the MP's identity but refused to apologize for homophobia, claiming a mistake is not a homophobic act. The RTP Head of News publicly apologized to the gay MP. Three enquires by independent bodies concluded it was an involuntary mistake. On 2 May 2016, the journalist was criticized by Socialist MP João Galamba after saying that part of Portugal's public debt was 'hidden' from view. The Socialist MP argued the practice was not illegal. José responded, saying he never said it was illegal – he just stated a fact, and asked if journalists are only allowed to report what politicians wanted them to report.

== Antisemitic remarks ==
In an interview for the TV program Grande Entrevista in November 2020, Rodrigues dos Santos stated about the Holocaust: "That was a gradual process, and at one point someone said: 'They are in the ghettos; they are starving; we can't feed them. If it's for them to die, they might as well do so in a humane way. And why not gas?'" The statement was attacked by journalists and historians alike, including Holocaust experts like Irene Pimentel and João Pinto Coelho who considered the comments "obscene". Rodrigues dos Santos claimed that under no circumstances did he say gassing Jews was "humane", emphasizing that "quoting is not agreeing". Again ERC, the Portuguese official media watchdog, opened an inquiry on the controversy following complaints. After reviewing the full interview, ERC concluded that José Rodrigues dos Santos' statements were "distorted" because "quoted out of context, discourse and reasoning" and that the analysis of his words "showed the interviewee neither minimizes nor lightens the crimes committed against the Jews in the concentration camps". After quoting several statements by José Rodrigues dos Santos in the same interview, including when he stressed the seriousness and horrific nature of the crimes committed against Jews in the Nazi concentration camps, ERC made it clear the complaints were "groundless".

== Published works ==
=== Essays ===
- Comunicação, Difusão Cultural, 1992; Prefácio, 2001
- Crónicas de Guerra - Vol. I - Da Crimeia a Dachau, Gradiva, 2001; Círculo de Leitores, 2002
- Crónicas de Guerra - Vol. II - De Saigão a Bagdade, Gradiva, 2002; Círculo de Leitores, 2002
- A Verdade da Guerra, Gradiva, 2002; Círculo de Leitores, 2003

=== Novels ===
- A Ilha das Trevas, Temas & Debates, 2002; Prefácio e Círculo de Leitores, 2003; Gradiva, 2007
- A Filha do Capitão, Gradiva, 2004
- O Codex 632: The Secret of Christopher Columbus: A Novel, Gradiva, 2005 [Tomás Noronha series, #1]
- The Einstein Enigma: A Novel, Gradiva, 2006 [Tomás Noronha series, #2]
- O Sétimo Selo, Gradiva, 2007 [Tomás Noronha series, #3]
- A Vida Num Sopro, Gradiva, 2008
- Fúria Divina, Gradiva, 2009 [Tomás Noronha series, #4]
- A Última Entrevista de José Saramago, Vermelho Marinho, 2010
- O Anjo Branco, Gradiva, 2010
- O Último Segredo, Gradiva, 2011 [Tomás Noronha series, #5]
- Novas Conversas de Escritores, Gradiva, 2012
- A Mão do Diabo, Gradiva, 2012 [Tomás Noronha series, #6]
- O Homem de Constantinopla, Gradiva, 2013
- Um Milionário em Lisboa, Gradiva, 2013
- A Chave de Salomão, Gradiva, 2014 [Tomás Noronha series, #7]
- As Flores de Lótus, Gradiva, 2015
- O Pavilhão Púrpura, Gradiva, (launch in 2016)
- Vaticanum, Gradiva, (launch in 2016) [Tomás Noronha series, #8]
- O Reino do Meio, Gradiva, (launch in 2017)
- Sinal de Vida, Gradiva, (launch in 2017) [Tomás Noronha series, #9]
- A Amante do Governador, Gradiva, (launch in 2018)
- Imortal, Gradiva, October 2019 [Tomás Noronha series, #10]
- A Mulher do Dragão Vermelho, Planeta, 2022
