= A Fórmula de Deus =

Novel by José Rodrigues dos Santos

God's Formula
- Author: José Rodrigues dos Santos
- Original title: A Fórmula de Deus
- Translator: Lisa Carter
- Publisher: William Morrow
- Publication date: 2006
- Publication place: Portugal
- English publication date: September 7, 2010
- Pages: 496
- ISBN: 0-06-171924-2

A Fórmula de Deus (God's Formula), in English The Einstein Enigma, is the fourth novel written by the Portuguese journalist and writer José Rodrigues dos Santos, published in 2006 in Portugal. It was the best-selling novel in Portugal in 2006, selling 100,000 copies.

The novel narrates a quest for the scientific proof of the existence of god by a Portuguese professor, Tomás Noronha, based on a formula developed by Albert Einstein himself. The adventure takes place in Iran, Tibet and Portugal, with the involvement of the CIA. The book presents an innovative view about the origins of the universe, based on recent physics theories.

== Story ==
It is the spring of 1951. Just off a small street in Princeton, NJ, an unidentified man stands hidden, carefully monitoring an unfolding scene. A police-escorted motorcade stops at a small, unremarkable house while an old man with a shock of white hair jumps out of the lead car. As he ambles up the walkway, a man of around the same age—also sporting wild white hair—descends from the porch and warmly greets him. The observer lurking in the shadows is CIA — fellow operatives are also close by, recording the conversation taking place inside the house between newly arrived Israeli Prime Minister David Ben-Gurion and his host, the word-renowned scientist Albert Einstein. The subject of their conversation: nuclear weapons and the existence of God.

World-famous cryptanalyst Tomás Noronha is waiting on the front steps of the Egyptian Museum in Cairo when an attractive, dark-haired woman approaches and invites him to lunch in the Moslem quarter. Her name is Ariana Pakravan. She is Iranian and during the course of their lunch hires Tomás to decipher a cryptogram hidden in an unknown document that has been recently discovered in Iran and is at present being kept under heavy security in Tehran. The document turns out to be a manuscript written by Albert Einstein, and its content may prove so extraordinary that it's likely to shake the world. The manuscript's title is, simply, Die Gottesformel. The Einstein Enigma.

Before Tomás leaves for Tehran, however, the American cultural attaché in Lisbon invites him for a meeting at the US Embassy. There, the cryptanalyst meets with two CIA operatives who warn him that the manuscript in question is in fact Einstein's recipe for an easily produced atomic bomb, commissioned many years ago by Israeli Prime Minister David Ben-Gurion. Iran cannot be allowed to develop such a weapon: Tomás is assigned the mission of co-operating with the Iranians in order to ascertain the precise content of the manuscript and report back his findings. Once in Tehran, Tomás finds that the manuscript, written in German, is filled with enigmatic riddles. The first is a strange and dark poem written in English:

Die Gottesformel
Terra if fin
De terrors tight
Sabbath fore
Christ nite
See sign
!ya ovqo

As Tomás begins to decipher the rest of the manuscript, he's placed on a dangerous collision with an Iranian missile crisis.

== Characters ==
Tomás Noronha (protagonist)

Tomás is a professor of history at the Universidade Nova de Lisboa and a cryptanalyst, divorced for about five years. He is hired by Ariana Pakravan on behalf of the Iranian Ministry of Science to decipher Die Gottesformel, Einstein's document that thematizes the existence of God. He is later forced to spy on the Iranians for the CIA, as he wants the CIA and Iran, they think Die Gottesformel gives the formula for creating an easy, cheap and destructive nuclear bomb like never before. Furthermore, he ends up falling in love with Ariana.

Ariana Pakravan

Nuclear physicist working for the Iranian Ministry of Science. She helps Tomás decipher Einstein's manuscript and betrays her country to save the Portuguese. Despite being in love with him, Ariana resists Tomás' advances due to the strict Iranian laws and the cultural difference between her and him.

Frank Bellamy

Director of the CIA's Directorate of Operations. Under the belief Iranians are trying to manufacture a new nuclear weapon, he forces Tomás to play a double game, helping the Iranians, but revealing all the information to the American agency.

Manuel Noronha

Tomás' father, a professor of mathematics at the University of Coimbra. Despite dying from lung cancer, Manuel proves to be an important help in the investigation of Tomás, with whom he never had such a close relationship as it should have been between father and son.

Luís Rocha

Assistant to Professor Augusto Siza, who collaborated with Einstein in the creation of Die Gottesformel and was kidnapped by the Iranians, helps Tomás in interpreting the results of the investigation into the manuscript.
