= Robinson Crusoe (2016 film) =

2016 Belgian-French animated film by Vincent Kesseloot and Ben Stassen

- German theatrical release poster
- Directed by: Vincent Kesteloot; Ben Stassen
- Written by: Lee Christopher; Domonic Paris; Graham Weldon
- Based on: Robinson Crusoe by Daniel Defoe
- Produced by: Gina Gallo; Mimi Maynard; Domonic Paris; Ben Stassen; Caroline Van Iseghem
- Starring: Matthias Schweighöfer; Kaya Yanar; Cindy aus Marzahn; Dieter Hallervorden; Aylin Tezel
- Edited by: Vincent Kesteloot
- Music by: Ramin Djawadi
- Production companies: StudioCanal; nWave Pictures; Illuminata Pictures
- Distributed by: Belga Films (Belgium); StudioCanal (France)
- Release dates: 5 February 2016 (Brussels International Animation Film Festival); 30 March 2016 (Belgium); 20 April 2016 (France); 9 September 2016 (United States)
- Running time: 90 minutes
- Countries: Belgium; France
- Languages: English; French; German
- Budget: $13 million
- Box office: $42.4 million

Robinson Crusoe (released in North America as The Wild Life) is a 2016 3D animated adventure comedy film directed by Vincent Kesteloot and Ben Stassen and written by Lee Christopher, Domonic Paris and Graham Weldon. The film is loosely based on the 1719 novel Robinson Crusoe by Daniel Defoe, but from the point of view of the island's animals. The film was released in the United States on September 9, 2016. Despite receiving negative reviews from the critics and earning an 18% approval rating on Rotten Tomatoes, Robinson Crusoe was a moderate box office success, grossing $42.4 million worldwide against a budget of $13 million.

== Plot ==
An English cartographer, Robinson Crusoe and his pet Airedale Terrier, Aynsley have booked passage on a ship to the New World. During a violent storm, the two are accidentally locked in the ship's belowdeck along with a pair of spoiled British Shorthairs, Mal and May, while the crew escapes with their lives. He is knocked unconscious by a Lantern leaving Aynsley mourning over his master.

Regaining consciousness and arriving on an island the next day, Crusoe begins to look for a way out while a group of animals of the island: a kingfisher named Kiki, an elderly goat named Scrubby, a veiled chameleon named Carmello, a Malayan tapir named Rosie, a ground pangolin with an Australian accent named Pango, a scarlet macaw named Tuesday (real name, Mak), and an echidna named Epi watch him from a distance. While the others become secretly worried that The Stranger on the island will murder them, Tuesday thinks that The Stranger’s arrival will be his ticket to see what the world outside of their island might be. When Tuesday gets attacked by Mal and May in an ambush, Aynsley drives them away and Crusoe takes Tuesday aboard the wreckage. Aynsley convinces Tuesday that he and Crusoe are friends. Meanwhile, Mal and May trick Kiki and the others into believing Crusoe has murdered Tuesday and have them attack Crusoe. Mal and May go into the ship wreckage and start attacking Tuesday while Aynsley protects him. In the ensuing chaos, Aynsley is pinned under a door as the remains of the ship begin to catch fire. Tuesday makes it out in time, but Aynsley dies in the explosion, which leads the animals think that Tuesday died in the explosion. Mal and May are thrown out of the ship into the black water and end up stranded on "Curse Island", a little island where all the bugs live.

A soaked Tuesday leads a grieving Crusoe to meet his friends. Scrubby throws a heart attack, but the animals approach the stranger. Slowly but surely, the animals realize that Crusoe is friendly and begin helping him adjust to life on the island. However, Kiki becomes increasingly annoyed by the others' willingness to adapt to Crusoe's lifestyle once they move into his newly built home. Meanwhile, Mal and May survive on bugs as the latter gives birth to more and more kittens as time goes by. Eventually, the cats manage to get back on the main island and decide to put an end to Crusoe and his friends' easy lives. Though outnumbered, Crusoe and his animal friends put up a good fight against them. During the battle, Crusoe is knocked down and Mal sets his home on fire with him in it. Crusoe's friends finally manage to lure the cats into a wooden watchtower built by Crusoe before causing it collapse, thus, forcing the cats to fall into the black water below and use part of the broken wooden watchtower as a raft.

Just before the animals can celebrate, Tuesday notices smoke rising and notices that Crusoe is still trapped under the burning ship. Alarmed, Tuesday flies to the rescue and notices Crusoe trapped under a pile of planks. He is able to free him and they are able to escape from the burning ship. But as they are escaping, a falling wooden plank falls and knocks Crusoe unconscious. As the rest of the animals arrive to help Crusoe, they are suddenly alarmed by a ship's cannons and forced to flee before a crew of bloodthirsty pirates led by Long John Silver "rescue" and take Crusoe back to their ship the next morning. While Crusoe recounts his own version of the story to the captain, Tuesday tells a pair of ship mice, Rufus and Cecil the true version. Afterwards, the pirates get ready to set sail, but when Crusoe learns that they don't intend to head for England under fear of the gallows, he tries to jump ship while barely fending off the pirate crew. With Tuesday's help, both he, Crusoe, and the mice barely manage to escape back to the island alive where they choose to spend the remainder of their lives while the surviving cats make their way into the pirate ship where they are eventually found and adopted by the pirates as their new pets/ratters.

== Voice cast ==
Character	German	English
Papagei Dienstag / Mak	Kaya Yanar	James Arnold Taylor (credited as David Howard)
Robinson Crusoe	Matthias Schweighöfer	Yuri Lowenthal
Tapir Rosie	Ilka Bessin (credited as Cindy aus Marzahn)	Laila Berzins
Ziegenbock Zottel / Scrubby	Dieter Hallervorden	Joey Camen
Stachelschwein / Epi	Aylin Tezel	Sandy Fox
Carmello	Gerald Schaale	Colin Metzger
Kiki	Melanie Hinze	Marieve Herington (credited as Lindsay Torrance)
Pango	Tobias Lelle	Jeff Doucette
Ping / May	Ghadah Al-Akel	Debi Tinsley
Pong / Mal	Tommy Morgenstern	Jeff Doucette
Edgar / Aynsley	Bert Franzke	Doug Stone
Rufus	Jesco Wirthgen	Joe Ochman (credited as B.J. Oakie)
Cecil	Jan Makino	Michael Sorich
Tom Cat	–	Kyle Hebert
Friday	–	Jay Jones
Long John Silver	Axel Lutter	Dennis O'Connor
Sleeping Sailor	–	George Babbit
Sailor #1	–	Joe Ochman (credited as Joey Lotsko)
Sailor #2	–	Lex Lang
Bosun	Jan David Ronfeldt	Kirk Thornton (credited as Ron Allen)

== Reception ==
=== Box office ===
As of 29 September 2026 the film has grossed $8 million in North America and $34.4 million in other territories for a worldwide total of $42.4 million.

In the United States, where the film is marketed as The Wild Life, it was released on 9 September 2016, alongside The Disappointments Room, Sully and When the Bough Breaks, and was projected to gross around $5 million from 2,493 theaters in its opening weekend. It went on to gross $3.4 million in its opening weekend, finishing 5th at the box office. In China, the film was released on 4 October 2016, and has grossed CN¥48.6 million.

=== Critical response ===
Critical reaction to Robinson Crusoe was mostly negative. On Rotten Tomatoes, the film has an approval rating of 17%, based on 59 reviews, with an average rating of 4.1/10. The site's critical consensus reads, "The Wild Life uses its classic source material as a half-hearted springboard into a colorfully animated but essentially empty experience that only the youngest of viewers will find at all entertaining." On Metacritic, which assigns a weighted average to reviews, the film has a score of 36 out of 100, based on 17 critics, indicating "generally unfavorable reviews".

Audiences polled by CinemaScore gave the film an average grade of "B−" on an A+ to F scale.
