= Belga Films =

Belgian film company

- Type: Société anonyme
- Industry: Entertainment
- Founded: 1937
- Founder: Elyse Tobback
- Defunct: February 12, 2026; 8 months ago
- Headquarters: 14 Avenue du Japon 1420, Braine-l'Alleud, Belgium
- Area served: Worldwide
- Key people: Patrick Vandenbosch; (CEO); Jérôme de Béthune; (COO)
- Revenue: ▲€20 million (2023)
- Total assets: ▲€38 million (2023)
- Total equity: ▲€11 million (2023)
- Subsidiaries: Belga Pictures; Belga Studios; Independent Films; Médiaciné; nWave Studios; White Cinema
- Website: www.belgafilms.be

Belga Films was a Belgian film production and distribution company founded in 1937 by Elyse Tobback. As the oldest film distributor in Belgium, it played a pivotal role in both the local and international film markets. The company was involved in film distribution, production, and theatrical exhibition, with a strong presence in the Benelux region. It ceased operations on 12 February 2026.

Belga Films expanded its operations through acquisitions, partnerships, and the development of its production arm, Belga Studios, as well as its subsidiary nWave Studios. Sister companies Belga Studios and Independent Films continue to operate.

== History ==
=== Formation ===
Belga Films was founded in 1937 by Elyse Tobback, making it the oldest independent film distribution company in Belgium. The company initially focused on distributing both local and international films, establishing itself as a key player in Belgian cinema with titles such as Berlingot and Company (1939), Cyrano de Bergerac (1946), and The Man in My Life (1951). In this period, Tobback's brother-in-law, Luc Hemelaer, joined the company.

In the 1970s and 1980s, Belga Films widened its distribution portfolio to include a wider range of international films, such as An Impudent Girl (1985), Vagabond (1985), Billy Ze Kick (1985), Chronicle of a Death Foretold (1987). At the same time, the company remained committed to promoting local Belgian cinema and played an active role in the early development of video distribution in Wallonia.

=== Expansion ===
Since 1998, Patrick Vandenbosch, grandson of Luc Hemelaer, served as the chief executive officer of Belga Films, while Jérôme de Béthune held the position of chief operating officer, overseeing the company's operations. In a significant restructuring, Vandenbosch and Alexandre Lippens acquired the company's shares from RTL Group, re-establishing Belga Films as an independent entity. This acquisition marked the beginning of a new phase for Belga Films, with a shift in strategy towards more selective acquisitions and a reduction in the number of films released annually. The company aimed to focus on more targeted content, rather than maintaining a broad release slate.

Alongside its distribution activities, Belga Films expanded into film production through Belga Studios. The company's productions included titles based on established franchises, such as The Yellow "M" based on the Blake and Mortimer series, and The Einstein Enigma, a thriller adapted from the novel by José Rodrigues dos Santos. Additionally, the company entered the cinema exhibition market with the launch of White Cinema in Brussels and Médiaciné in Liège.

=== Acquisitions ===
In 2022, Belga Films acquired full ownership of Independent Films, a Dutch distribution company with which it had previously maintained a 50/50 partnership. This acquisition integrated Dutch film development and distribution into Belga's operations, allowing the company to release films in both the Belgian and Dutch markets under a unified structure. It also enabled Belga to expand its operations in the Netherlands and develop more Dutch-language content. Before this acquisition, Belga Films and Independent Films had collaborated for over two decades, with Belga handling the distribution of Independent Films' titles in Belgium and vice versa in the Netherlands.

Belga Films also maintained an interest in the animation sector through its shareholding in nWave Studios, a Belgian animation studio. Notable productions from nWave include Bigfoot Family (2020) and Chickenhare and the Hamster of Darkness (2022). This partnership reflected Belga's strategy to diversify its portfolio and strengthen its presence in the animation sector.

=== Closure ===
In February 2026, Belga Films and its Brussels cinema subsidiary White Cinema were declared bankrupt and subsequently closed, ending the operations of Belgium’s oldest film distributor. The bankruptcy ruling was issued in mid-February, with the company’s insolvency attributed to financial difficulties exacerbated by competition from streaming services and limited access to major international releases, and resulting in the loss of dozens of jobs. The White Cinema, which opened in 2016, also ceased activities following the parent company’s collapse.

== Assets ==
As of 2023, Belga Films' subsidiaries and affiliated entities include:

- Belga Pictures – a limited liability company focusing on film production and distribution.
- Belga Studios – a limited liability company engaged in developing and funding feature films.
- Independent Films – a public limited company specializing in Dutch film distribution.
- Médiaciné – a public limited company managing cinema operations in Liège.
- nWave Studios – a public limited company known for producing 3D animated films.
- White Cinema – a limited liability company operating a cinema chain in Brussels.
