= Fly Me to the Moon (2008 film) =

- Theatrical release poster
- Directed by: Ben Stassen
- Written by: Domonic Paris
- Produced by: Gina Gallo; Charlotte Huggins; Mimi Maynard; Caroline Van Iseghem
- Starring: Kelly Ripa; Christopher Lloyd; Nicollette Sheridan; Tim Curry; Buzz Aldrin
- Edited by: Kerry Fulton
- Music by: Ramin Djawadi
- Production companies: nWave Pictures; Illuminata Pictures; Le Tax Shelter du Gouvernement Fédéral de Belgique; uMedia; uFilm
- Distributed by: Kinepolis Film Distribution (Belgium); Summit Entertainment (United States)
- Release dates: 30 January 2008 (Belgium); 15 August 2008 (United States)
- Running time: 80 minutes; 50 minutes (IMAX version)
- Countries: Belgium; United States
- Language: English
- Budget: $25-30 million
- Box office: $41.7 million

Fly Me to the Moon is a 2008 animated science fiction comedy film about three flies who stowaway aboard Apollo 11 and travel to the Moon. It was directed by Ben Stassen and written by Domonic Paris. The film was released in digital 3-D in Belgium on 30 January 2008, and in the US and Canada on 15 August. The film was also released in IMAX 3-D in the US and Canada on 8 August. The film serves as a fictionalized retelling of the 1969 Apollo 11 mission by incorporating a story of three young flies that stow away on the rocket to fulfill their dream of going up to the moon, while their families take on a group of Soviet flies who try to sabotage the mission.

Fly Me to the Moon was produced by nWave Pictures in association with Illuminata Pictures, and distributed by Summit Entertainment in the United States. The film received generally negative reviews from critics and was a box office disappointment, only grossing $41.7 million against a $25 million budget.

== Plot ==
The narrator explains that in 1957, the Soviet Union launched Earth's first satellite Sputnik 1 into orbit. In 1961, when NASA was putting a chimpanzee aboard Mercury Atlas 5, cosmonaut Yuri Gagarin became the first person to go to space. Feeling the sense of urgency to overtake the Soviets in the space race, U.S. President John F. Kennedy made a statement toward a joint session of Congress on May 25, 1961, stating that before the decade is out, he plans to launch a man to the Moon and return him safely to the Earth.

Eight years later, in 1969, an 11-year-old fly named Nat and his two best friends, I.Q. and Scooter, build a "fly-sized" rocket in a field across from Cape Canaveral, Florida, where Apollo 11 sits on the Kennedy Space Center Launch Complex 39. From his earliest memory, Nat's grandfather, Amos, often tells him of his many adventures such as his daring rescue of Amelia Earhart when she crossed the Atlantic Ocean on her historic 1932 solo flight. Wanting to be an adventurer like his grandpa, Nat tells his friends his plan to get aboard Apollo 11 and go to the Moon. They, with some reluctance, are in. The next morning, the three flies make it into Launch Control and stow away inside the space helmets of astronauts Neil Armstrong, Buzz Aldrin, and Michael Collins. Moments later, Flight Director Gene Kranz in Houston's Mission Control Center gives the go for launch. As the Saturn V rocket climbs through the atmosphere and reaches its Earth parking orbit, Nat, Scooter, and IQ's mothers faint upon hearing from Grandpa that their sons will be in space for a week.

Grandpa, Nat's mother, and the others watch TV to get news of their offspring's adventures. As the astronauts appear on camera, the heroic flies wave in the background, visible to other flies but barely seen by humans – except for the attentive NASA flight controller Steve Bales, who informs Armstrong of the "contaminants" on board. In the Soviet Union, there are other flies watching TV – Soviet flies who cannot tolerate the idea that American flies might get to the Moon first. Special Soviet operatives are enlisted to interfere with the American mission, including an operative named Yegor. Fortunately, Nadia, a Soviet fly, hears Scooter calling out the name of Amos, who she met in Paris and loved many years ago.

Onboard the Command Module Columbia, as the burn cycle to enter the Moon's trans-lunar injection orbit begins, the spacecraft is violently rocked. There's a short circuit in the service module that must be fixed manually or the ship won't be able to complete its mission. Nat and I.Q. fly through a maze of wires, find the problem, and repair it just in time. Unaware of the flies' aid, the ship enters orbit and the astronauts perform the maneuver to turn Columbia around to dock with the Lunar Module Eagle and pull it away from the spent S-IVB rocket. Just as the flies congratulate each other, they are sprayed with a numbing aerosol and held captive in a test tube.

The flies manage to break the vial. Nat sneaks into Armstrong's helmet as he enters Eagle, which lands on Mare Tranquillitatis. From inside Armstrong's helmet, Nat beams with every awe-inspiring historic step. I.Q. and Scooter join him on the surface inside Aldrin's helmet. After a climactic rescue with Nat bringing Scooter back to Columbia, Eagle is jettisoned. Back on Earth, other plots are being set in motion. After more than 30 years apart, Nadia arrives in America, visits Amos, and tells him and Nat's mother about the Soviet plot to divert the mission. Amos takes off with a vow to save the mission. At Mission Control, the Soviet operatives prepare to alter the descent codes. Unaware of the potential danger, the Apollo 11 astronauts and the flies prepare to come back home.

Amos, Nat's mother, Nadia, their friend Louie (Scooter's grandpa), I.Q.'s grandpa and Nat's older teenage brothers, Ray and Butch, join forces to stop Yegor and the Soviet plan as Columbia arrives near Earth's atmosphere. With their combined efforts, the Soviet threat is crushed, thus saving the astronauts and the flies. After a short period of radio silence due to ionization blackout, Columbia splashes down safely in the Pacific Ocean, where it is recovered by USS Hornet. Nat, I.Q., and Scooter return to their junkyard as heroes.

At the film's end, the real Buzz Aldrin appears and explains that no flies were on board during the historic flight, and it is scientifically impossible for a bug to go to space.

== Voice cast ==
- Trevor Gagnon as Nat McFly
- Philip Daniel Bolden as I.Q. McFly
- David Gore as Scooter McFly
- Christopher Lloyd as Grandpa McFly
- Kelly Ripa as Nat's Mom
- Nicollette Sheridan as Nadia
- Tim Curry as Yegor
- Ed Begley Jr. as Poopchev
- Adrienne Barbeau as Scooter's Mom
- Robert Patrick as Louie
- Mimi Maynard as I.Q.'s Mom
- Buzz Aldrin as himself
- Cam Clarke as Ray
- Scott Menville as Butch
- Steve Kramer as Leonid
- Doug Stone as Russian Newscaster
- Max Burkholder as Mom's Maggot
- Jessica Gee as Maggot #1
- Mona Marshall as Maggot #2
- Barbara Goodson as Maggot #3
- Gregg Berger as Pale Russian Flies
- Charles Rocket as Mission Control 1961

== Production ==
The total production budget of Fly Me to the Moon is €17.3 million (about $25.2 million). nWave financed about 75% of the budget itself. To raise the rest, investors could benefit from Belgium's Tax Shelter system. The Flanders Audiovisual Fund contributed €100,000 ($146,100), 10% of its annual budget for animation.

Apart from the feature-length version, two further versions of the films exist. The 49-minute Attraction version was released across theme parks starting in the summer of 2007. Venues showing this version, which features added 4-D effects, include Isla Magica in Spain, Mirabilandia in Italy, Bellewaerde in Belgium, Bakken and Planetariet in Denmark, and Blackpool Pleasure Beach in the UK, as well as the Adler Planetarium in Chicago and the Museum of Science in Boston. This version of the film omits the subplot about the attempt by Russian flies to sabotage the mission. The 13-minute Ride version is featured at Six Flags Great Adventure in New Jersey and Six Flags Over Texas in Texas.

Fly Me to the Moon marked the final film role of actor Charles Rocket; it was released three years after his death in 2005. Charles Rocket played the voice of Mission Control for the scenes set in 1961.

== Release ==
Fly Me to the Moon was distributed in the U.S. by Summit Entertainment, Which is before Lionsgate Films acquired and in the U.K. by Momentum Pictures. As IMAX 3-D films are usually less or around an hour, some scenes were cut and censored from the IMAX version. The IMAX version starts with the opening scene which shows the first monkey being launched into space. It then cuts to Nat sneaking out to meet his friends and sneak into the command center, cutting out the scene with Nat and Amos, discussing Amelia Earhart. The IMAX version also cuts out the Soviet subplot.

Fly Me to the Moon was released on DVD in North America on 2 December 2008 by Universal Pictures Home Entertainment. Two versions were released, a standard 2-D version and a 3-D version of the film that includes two pairs of 3-D glasses. Bonus features on both versions include an interactive game, production notes, and more.

== Reception ==
=== Box office ===
Fly Me to the Moon was released in 12 IMAX 3-D theaters on 8 August 2008 in Canada and the United States, and a further 18 on 15 August. The film was released widely in 3-D-equipped theaters on 15 August. It earned $704,000 on opening day in 452 theaters and $1,900,523 in its opening weekend, drawing in the number 12 spot. As of November 2009, the film has grossed $41,412,008 worldwide.

=== Critical response ===
On the review aggregator website Rotten Tomatoes, 20% of 83 critics' reviews are positive, with an average rating of 3.9/10. The website's consensus reads: "Flatly animated and indifferently scripted, Fly Me To the Moon offers little for audiences not comprised of very young children." On Metacritic, the film has a score of 36 out of 100 based on 21 critics, indicating "generally unfavorable" reviews.

Linda Bernard of the Toronto Star gave it 2.5/4 stars, writing, "Adults used to animation that runs on two tracks – the upfront stuff for the tykes and a witty subtext to entertain big people – may grow bored with the kid-leaning sensibility of Fly Me to the Moon." The Austin Chronicle's Marc Savlov gave it 1/5 stars, saying it "boasts superb 3-D effects... and gobs of colorful animation, but anyone over the age of 8 is likely to be bored into madness by the lightweight puns that pass for real humor – WALL-E this ain't – and the film's overall 'eh' quotient."

The San Francisco Chronicle's Walter Addiego gave it 3/4 stars, calling it "a whimsical family offering" and saying it "is lifted out of the ordinary by 3-D images that at times are so realistic that audience members reach their hands into the air to try to touch them. It's clear that animators can now achieve levels of visual depth that were previously impossible." Lisa Schwarzbaum of Entertainment Weekly gave it a B− grade, calling the animation "brisk and sweet, even if the script veers toward fussy and lame in this tot-level retelling of the historic 1969 Apollo 11 moon mission."

== See also ==
- Apollo 11 in popular culture
- List of animated feature-length films
- List of computer-animated films
- List of 3-D films
- RealD 3D
- List of IMAX films
- Animals in space
- Zond 5, a 1968 Soviet Moon mission which included fruit fly eggs and two tortoises
- Fee, Fi, Fo, Fum, and Phooey, five mice who traveled to the Moon on Apollo 17
