= List of Nickelodeon Movies productions =

Logo used since 2020

The following is a list of all productions produced or released by Nickelodeon Movies, the family film division of Paramount Pictures (part of Skydance), including live-action and animated feature films, shorts, television and internet series, and specials.

Their first film was Harriet the Spy, which was released on July 10, 1996, with their latest being Paw Patrol: The Dino Movie, which was released on August 14, 2026. Their upcoming slate of films includes an untitled sequel to Teenage Mutant Ninja Turtles: Mutant Mayhem on August 13, 2027.

== Feature films ==
All films listed are produced and/or distributed by Paramount Pictures unless noted otherwise.

=== Theatrical films ===
Title	Release date	Director(s)	Writer(s)		Producer(s)	Composer(s)	Co-production with	Animation services
Title	Release date	Director(s)	Story	Screenplay	Producer(s)	Composer(s)	Co-production with	Animation services
Harriet the Spy (Note: Live-action film)	July 10, 1996	Bronwen Hughes	Greg Taylor; Julie Talen	Douglas Petrie; Theresa Rebeck	Mary Kay Powell; Nava Levin	Jamshied Sharifi	Rastar	—N/a
Good Burger	July 25, 1997	Brian Robbins	Dan Schneider; Kevin Kopelow; Heath Seifert		Mike Tollin; Brian Robbins	Stewart Copeland	Tollin/Robbins Productions	—N/a
The Rugrats Movie (Note: Animated film)	November 20, 1998	Norton Virgien; Igor Kovalyov	David N. Weiss; J. David Stem		Arlene Klasky; Gábor Csupó	Mark Mothersbaugh	Klasky Csupo	Grimsaem; Sunwoo Entertainment; Stardust Pictures
Snow Day	February 11, 2000	Chris Koch	Will McRobb; Chris Viscardi		Albie Hecht; Julia Pistor	Steve Bartek	C.O.R.E.	—N/a
Rugrats in Paris: The Movie	November 17, 2000	Stig Bergqvist; Paul Demeyer	J. David Stem; David N. Weiss; Jill Gorey; Barbara Herndon; Kate Boutilier		Arlene Klasky; Gábor Csupó	Mark Mothersbaugh	Klasky Csupo	Grimsaem; Sunwoo Entertainment; Rhythm & Hues Studios
Jimmy Neutron: Boy Genius	December 21, 2001	John A. Davis	John A. Davis; Steve Oedekerk	John A. Davis; J. David Stem; David N. Weiss; Steve Oedekerk	Steve Oedekerk; John A. Davis; Albie Hecht	John Debney	O Entertainment; DNA Productions	DNA Productions
Clockstoppers	March 29, 2002	Jonathan Frakes	Rob Hedden; Andy Hedden; J. David Stem; David N. Weiss	Rob Hedden; J. David Stem; David N. Weiss	Gale Anne Hurd; Julia Pistor	Jamshied Sharifi	Valhalla Motion Pictures	—N/a
Hey Arnold!: The Movie	June 28, 2002	Tuck Tucker	Craig Bartlett; Steve Viksten		Craig Bartlett; Albie Hecht	Jim Lang	Snee-Oosh, Inc. Nickelodeon Animation Studio	Nickelodeon Animation Studio; Saerom Animation
The Wild Thornberrys Movie	December 20, 2002	Cathy Malkasian; Jeff McGrath	Kate Boutilier		Arlene Klasky; Gábor Csupó	Drew Neumann	Klasky Csupo	Klasky Csupo; Sunwoo Entertainment
Rugrats Go Wild	June 13, 2003	Norton Virgien; John Eng	Kate Boutilier		Arlene Klasky; Gábor Csupó	Mark Mothersbaugh	Klasky Csupo	Klasky Csupo; Sunwoo Entertainment
The SpongeBob SquarePants Movie (Note: Live-action/animated film)	November 19, 2004	Stephen Hillenburg		Derek Drymon; Tim Hill; Stephen Hillenburg; Kent Osborne; Aaron Springer; Paul Tibbitt	Stephen Hillenburg; Julia Pistor	Gregor Narholz	United Plankton Pictures	Rough Draft Studios, Korea; Tony Gardner, Inc. Warner Bros. Animation
Lemony Snicket's A Series of Unfortunate Events	December 17, 2004	Brad Silberling	Robert Gordon		Laurie MacDonald; Walter F. Parkes; Jim Van Wyck	Thomas Newman	DreamWorks Pictures (international); Parkes/MacDonald Productions	—N/a
Mad Hot Ballroom (Note: Not produced by Nickelodeon Movies, but released under their label.)	May 13, 2005	Marilyn Agrelo	Amy Sewell		Marilyn Agrelo; Amy Sewell; Brian David; Cange Wilder Knight II	Joseph Baker; Steven Lutvak	Paramount Classics; Just One Productions	—N/a
Yours, Mine & Ours	November 23, 2005	Raja Gosnell	Ron Burch; David Kidd		Robert Simonds; Michael G. Nathanson	Christophe Beck	Metro-Goldwyn-Mayer; Columbia Pictures; Robert Simonds Company	—N/a
Nacho Libre	June 16, 2006	Jared Hess	Jared Hess; Jerusha Hess; Mike White		Mike White; Jack Black; Julia Pistor; David Klawans	Danny Elfman	HH Films; Black & White Productions	—N/a
Barnyard	August 4, 2006	Steve Oedekerk			Steve Oedekerk; Paul Marshal	John Debney	O Entertainment	Omation Animation Studio
Charlotte's Web	December 15, 2006	Gary Winick	Susannah Grant; Karey Kirkpatrick		Jordan Kerner	Danny Elfman	The Kerner Entertainment Company; Walden Media	Rising Sun Pictures; Tippett Studio; Rhythm & Hues Studios; Fuel International; Digital Studios Iloura; Illusion Arts, Inc. Digital Dimension; Reel FX, Inc.
The Spiderwick Chronicles	February 14, 2008	Mark Waters	Karey Kirkpatrick; David Berenbaum; John Sayles		Mark Canton; Larry Franco; Ellen Goldsmith-Vein; Karey Kirkpatrick	James Horner	The Kennedy/Marshall Company; Atmosphere Pictures	Industrial Light & Magic; Tippett Studio
Angus, Thongs and Perfect Snogging	July 25, 2008	Gurinder Chadha	Gurinder Chadha; Paul Mayeda Berges; Will McRobb; Chris Viscardi		Gurinder Chadha; Lynda Obst	Joby Talbot	Goldcrest Pictures	—N/a
Hotel for Dogs	January 16, 2009	Thor Freudenthal	Jeff Lowell; Mark McCorkle; Bob Schooley		Lauren Shuler Donner; Ewan Leslie; Jonathan Gordon; Jason Clark	John Debney	DreamWorks Pictures; Cold Spring Pictures; The Montecito Picture Company; The Donners' Company	Sony Pictures Imageworks
Imagine That	June 12, 2009	Karey Kirkpatrick	Ed Solomon; Chris Matheson		Lorenzo di Bonaventura; Ed Solomon	Mark Mancina	Di Bonaventura Pictures; Goldcrest Pictures	—N/a
The Last Airbender	July 1, 2010	M. Night Shyamalan			M. Night Shyamalan; Sam Mercer; Frank Marshall	James Newton Howard	Blinding Edge Pictures; The Kennedy/Marshall Company	Industrial Light & Magic
Rango	March 4, 2011	Gore Verbinski	John Logan; Gore Verbinski; James Ward Byrkit	John Logan	Gore Verbinski; Graham King; John B. Carls	Hans Zimmer	Blind Wink Productions; GK Films	Industrial Light & Magic
The Adventures of Tintin	December 21, 2011	Steven Spielberg	Steven Moffat; Edgar Wright; Joe Cornish		Steven Spielberg; Peter Jackson; Kathleen Kennedy	John Williams	Columbia Pictures (international); Amblin Entertainment; The Kennedy/Marshall Company; WingNut Films; Hemisphere Media Capital	Weta Digital
Fun Size	October 26, 2012	Josh Schwartz	Max Werner		Stephanie Savage; Josh Schwartz; Bard Dorros; David Kanter	Deborah Lurie	Anonymous Content; Fake Empire	—N/a
Teenage Mutant Ninja Turtles	August 8, 2014	Jonathan Liebesman	Josh Appelbaum; André Nemec; Evan Daugherty		Michael Bay; Andrew Form; Brad Fuller; Galen Walker; Scott Mednick; Ian Bryce	Brian Tyler	Platinum Dunes; Gama Entertainment; Mednick Productions; Heavy Metal	Industrial Light & Magic
The SpongeBob Movie: Sponge Out of Water	February 6, 2015	Paul Tibbitt	Stephen Hillenburg; Paul Tibbitt	Jonathan Aibel; Glenn Berger	Paul Tibbitt; Mary Parent	John Debney	Paramount Animation; United Plankton Pictures	Rough Draft Studios, Korea (2D animation); Iloura VFX (3D animation)
Teenage Mutant Ninja Turtles: Out of the Shadows	June 3, 2016	Dave Green	Josh Appelbaum; André Nemec		Michael Bay; Andrew Form; Brad Fuller; Galen Walker; Scott Mednick	Steve Jablonsky	Platinum Dunes; China Movie Media Group; Gama Entertainment; Mednick Productions; Smithrowe Entertainment; Alibaba Pictures	Industrial Light & Magic
Monster Trucks	January 13, 2017	Chris Wedge	Jonathan Aibel; Glenn Berger; Matthew Robinson	Derek Connolly	Mary Parent; Denis L. Stewart	Dave Sardy	Paramount Animation; Disruption Entertainment	Moving Picture Company; Lola Visual Effects; Prime Focus
Wonder Park	March 15, 2019	Dylan Brown (uncredited)	Robert Gordon; Josh Appelbaum; André Nemec	Josh Appelbaum; André Nemec	Josh Appelbaum; André Nemec; Kendra Halland	Steven Price	Paramount Animation	Ilion Animation Studios
Dora and the Lost City of Gold	August 9, 2019	James Bobin	Tom Wheeler; Nicholas Stoller	Nicholas Stoller; Matthew Robinson	Kristin Burr	John Debney; Germaine Franco	Paramount Players; Walden Media; Media Rights Capital; Burr! Productions	The Mill; Moving Picture Company; Blink Industries (2D animation scenes)
Playing with Fire	November 8, 2019	Andy Fickman	Dan Ewen	Dan Ewen; Matt Lieberman	Todd Garner; Sean Robbins	Nathan Wang	Paramount Players; Walden Media; Broken Road Productions	—N/a
The SpongeBob Movie: Sponge on the Run	August 14, 2020 (Note: The SpongeBob Movie: Sponge on the Run was theatrically released on August 14, 2020 only in Canada. It was later released on Netflix internationally on November 5, and then on Paramount+ on March 4, 2021 in the United States.)	Tim Hill	Tim Hill; Jonathan Aibel; Glenn Berger	Tim Hill	Ryan Harris	Hans Zimmer; Steve Mazzaro	Paramount Animation; United Plankton Pictures; MRC	Mikros Image
Paw Patrol: The Movie (Note: Unlike previous films from Nickelodeon Movies, Paw Patrol: The Movie was produced in Canada, and the film's copyright is owned by Spin Master rather than Paramount. Nickelodeon Movies only distributed the film internationally, and did not produce it outright.)	August 20, 2021	Cal Brunker	Billy Frolick	Billy Frolick; Cal Brunker; Bob Barlen	Jennifer Dodge	Heitor Pereira	Spin Master Entertainment	Mikros Image
Paws of Fury: The Legend of Hank (Note: Paws of Fury: The Legend of Hank is a film that had been in development for many years, and had no involvement from Nickelodeon or Paramount. Paramount had acquired the distribution rights to the film from GFM Animation in January 2022 for select territories and was later announced to be released under Paramount Animation, later Nickelodeon Movies.)	July 15, 2022	Rob Minkoff; Mark Koetsier; Chris Bailey	Andrew Bergman	Ed Stone; Nate Hopper; Mel Brooks; Norman Steinberg; Andrew Bergman; Richard Pryor; Alan Uger	Rob Minkoff; Adam Nagle; Peter Nagle; Guy Collins; Yair Landau; Susan Purcell	Bear McCreary	Aniventure; Align; Brooksfilms; Flying Tigers Entertainment; GFM Animation; HB Wink Animation; Cinesite	Cinesite
Teenage Mutant Ninja Turtles: Mutant Mayhem	August 2, 2023	Jeff Rowe Co-director: Kyler Spears	Brendan O'Brien; Seth Rogen; Evan Goldberg; Jeff Rowe	Seth Rogen; Evan Goldberg; Jeff Rowe; Dan Hernandez; Benji Samit	Seth Rogen; Evan Goldberg; James Weaver	Trent Reznor; Atticus Ross	Point Grey Pictures	Mikros Animation; Cinesite
Paw Patrol: The Mighty Movie	September 29, 2023	Cal Brunker	Cal Brunker; Bob Barlen; Shane Morris	Cal Brunker; Bob Barlen	Jennifer Dodge; Laura Clunie; Toni Stevens	Pinar Toprak	Spin Master Entertainment	Mikros Animation
Under the Boardwalk (Note: Under the Boardwalk was produced by Paramount Animation with no involvement from Nickelodeon. The Nickelodeon Movies logo was shown in the theatrical release only.)	October 27, 2023 (Limited theatrical release)	David Soren	Lorene Scafaria; David Dobkin	Lorene Scafaria; David Soren	David Dobkin; Dagan Potter; Allison Gardner	John Debney; Jonathan Sadoff	Paramount Animation; Big Kid Pictures	DNEG Animation
The SpongeBob Movie: Search for SquarePants	December 19, 2025	Derek Drymon	Pam Brady; Kaz; Marc Ceccarelli	Pam Brady; Matt Lieberman	Lisa Stewart; Pam Brady; Aaron Dem	John Debney	Paramount Animation; United Plankton Pictures; MRC	Reel FX Animation; Fuse FX; Cinesite
Avatar Aang: The Last Airbender	July 24, 2026 (Limited theatrical release) (Note: Avatar Aang: The Last Airbender was given a limited theatrical release from July 24-July 30, 2026 in two theaters in New York and Los Angeles in order to make it eligible for certain accolades such as the Oscars. The film was officially released worldwide on Paramount+ on July 25.)	Lauren Montgomery	Bryan Konietzko; Michael Dante DiMartino; Tim Hedrick; Kenneth Lin	Tim Hedrick; Christopher Yost	Bryan Konietzko; Michael DiMartino; Eric Coleman; Dagan Potter	Jeremy Zuckerman	Avatar Studios	Flying Bark Productions; Studio Mir
Paw Patrol: The Dino Movie	August 14, 2026	Cal Brunker	Cal Brunker; Bob Barlen		Jennifer Dodge; Laura Clunie; Toni Stevens	Pinar Toprak	Paramount Animation; Spin Master Entertainment	Mikros Animation

=== Streaming films ===
Title	Release date	Director(s)	Writer(s)		Producer(s)	Composer(s)	Co-production with	Animation services
Title	Release date	Director(s)	Story	Screenplay	Producer(s)	Composer(s)	Co-production with	Animation services
The Loud House Movie	August 20, 2021	Dave Needham	Kevin Sullivan; Chris Viscardi		Chris Viscardi	Philip White; Christopher Lennertz (themes)	(distributed by Netflix)	Nickelodeon Animation Studio; Top Draw Animation
The J Team	September 3, 2021	Michael Lembeck	Eydie Faye		JoJo Siwa; Eydie Faye; Don Dunn; Syrinthia Studer	Gabriel Mann	JoJo Siwa Inc. (distributed by Paramount+)	—N/a
Rise of the Teenage Mutant Ninja Turtles: The Movie	August 5, 2022	Andy Suriano; Ant Ward		Tony Gama-Lobo; Rebecca May	Vladimir Radev (line producer)	Matt Mahaffey	(distributed by Netflix)	Nickelodeon Animation Studio; Flying Bark Productions; Top Draw Animation
Blue's Big City Adventure	November 18, 2022	Matt Stawski	Liz Maccie; Angela Santomero		Traci Paige Johnson; Angela Santomero	Alex Geringas; Anthony Green	9 Story Media Group; Brown Bag Films; Line by Line Media (distributed by Paramount+)	Nickelodeon Animation Studio; Boxel Animation
Fantasy Football	November 25, 2022	Anton Cropper	Zoe Marshall; Dan Gurewitch; David Young		LeBron James; Spencer Beighley; Jamal Henderson; Marsai Martin; Joshua Martin; Timothy Bourne	Kovas	SpringHill Company; Genius Productions; NFL Films (distributed by Paramount+)	—N/a
Snow Day	December 16, 2022	Michael Lembeck	Samantha Martin; Chris Viscardi		Zack Olin; Shauna Phelena; Ronald Gilbert	Gabriel Mann	Muse Entertainment (distributed by Paramount+)	—N/a
Zoey 102	July 27, 2023	Nancy Hower	Monica Sherer; Madeline Whitby		Shauna Phelan; Zack Olin	Roger Neill	(distributed by Paramount+)	—N/a
A Really Haunted Loud House	September 28, 2023	Jonathan Judge	Tony Gama-Lobo; Rebecca May	Tony Gama-Lobo; Rebecca May; Tim Hobert	Jonathan Judge; Michael Rubiner; Don Dunn; Melanie Kirk	Nick Urata	(distributed by Paramount+)	—N/a
Monster High 2	October 5, 2023	Todd Holland	Todd Holland; Matt Eddy; Billy Eddy		Todd Holland; Adam Bonnett; Frederic "Fred" Soulie; Philip "Phil" Breman; Shawn Williamson; David Magee; Emanuel Pereira	Sunna Wehrmeijer	Mattel Television; Brightlight Pictures (distributed by Paramount+)	—N/a
Good Burger 2	November 22, 2023	Phil Traill	Kevin Kopelow; Heath Seifert		Kenan Thompson; Kel Mitchell	Oak Felder	Artists for Artists (distributed by Paramount+)	—N/a
Baby Shark's Big Movie!	December 8, 2023	Alan Foreman	Whitney Ralls		Eryk Casemiro	Jon Chau	Pinkfong (distributed by Paramount+)	Nickelodeon Animation Studio
The Thundermans Return	March 7, 2024	Trevor Kirschner	Jed Spingarn; Sean W. Cunningham; Marc Dworkin	Jed Spingarn	Jed Spingarn; Kira Kosarin; Jack Griffo; Dan Cross; David Hoge; Zack Olin; Shauna Phelan; Chris Phillips	Caleb Chan; Brian Chan	Cross Hoge Productions; Dworkingham Productions (distributed by Paramount+)	—N/a
The Casagrandes Movie	March 22, 2024	Miguel Puga	Tony Gama-Lobo; Rebecca May; Lalo Alcaraz; Rosemary Contreras		Michael Rubiner	Marcelo Treviño	Mighty Studios (distributed by Netflix)	Nickelodeon Animation Studio; Jam Filled Entertainment; Mighty Animation
No Time to Spy: A Loud House Movie	June 21, 2024	Kyle Marshall	Whitney Wetta; Jeffrey Sayers		Ian Murray (line producer)	Jonathan Hylander	(distributed by Paramount+)	Nickelodeon Animation Studio; Jam Filled Entertainment
Saving Bikini Bottom: The Sandy Cheeks Movie	August 2, 2024	Liza Johnson	Kaz	Kaz; Tom Stern	Robert Engleman	Moniker	United Plankton Pictures (distributed by Netflix)	Nickelodeon Animation Studio; Sinking Ship Entertainment; Pipeline Studios; Spin VFX; ReDefine Animation
Henry Danger: The Movie	January 17, 2025	Joe Menendez	Jake Farrow; Christopher J. Nowak		Jace Norman; Jake Farrow; Ron French; Joe Menendez; Christopher J. Nowak	Paul Edward-Francis	Yes Yes Coffee (distributed by Paramount+)	—N/a
Plankton: The Movie	March 7, 2025	David Needham	Mr. Lawrence	Kaz; Mr. Lawrence; Chris Viscardi	Nicholas Russell (line producer)	Mahuia Bridgman-Cooper	United Plankton Pictures (distributed by Netflix)	Nickelodeon Animation Studio; Mikros Animation; ReDefine; Animation Yukfoo Animation; McBess Studios
Dora and the Search for Sol Dorado	July 2, 2025	Alberto Belli	JT Billings		Kristin Burr; Benjamin Tappan; Carolina Arciniegas; Kenny Wood	Kenny Wood	Walsh Valdés Productions (distributed by Paramount+)	—N/a
A Loud House Christmas Movie: Naughty or Nice	November 21, 2025	Darin McGowan	Tony Gama-Lobo; Rebecca May		April Lawrence; Michael Rubiner	Jonathan Hylander	(Note: A Loud House Christmas Movie: Naughty or Nice is a television film that didn't get a streaming release but was produced by Nickelodeon Movies.)	Nickelodeon Animation Studio; Jam Filled Entertainment
My Weird School	December 30, 2025	Jonathan Judge	Shauna Phelan		Brin Lukens	Brittany Cope	Quick to Judge (distributed by Paramount+) (Note: Despite Paramount+ being credited as a distributor, they decided not to pick up the film after its initial airing on Nickelodeon. As such, the film has only aired on the channel once and is only available on VOD.)	—N/a

=== Upcoming films ===
Title	Release date	Director(s)	Writer(s)		Producer(s)	Composer(s)	Co-production with	Animation services
Title	Release date	Director(s)	Story	Screenplay	Producer(s)	Composer(s)	Co-production with	Animation services
Untitled Teenage Mutant Ninja Turtles: Mutant Mayhem sequel	August 13, 2027	Jeff Rowe Co-directors: Kyler Spears & Yashar Kassai	TBA		Seth Rogen; Evan Goldberg; James Weaver; Ramsay McBean; Josh Fagen		Paramount Animation; Point Grey Pictures	Mikros Animation
Untitled live-action Teenage Mutant Ninja Turtles film	November 17, 2028	TBA			Neal H. Moritz; Toby Ascher		Original Film	—N/a
Yokai Samba	TBA	Leo Matsuda			TBA		Paramount Animation	TBA
Untitled third SpongeBob SquarePants spinoff film	TBA						United Plankton Pictures (distributed by Paramount+)	TBA
Untitled live-action Rugrats film	TBA	Jason Moore	Mikey Day; Streeter Seidell		TBA		Paramount Players; Klasky Csupo	TBA
Untitled Jimmy Neutron: Boy Genius sequel	TBA			Adam Pava	TBA		Paramount Animation	TBA

== Short films ==
Title	Release date	Directed by	Animation services	Release with	Notes
Arnold	July 10, 1996	Craig Bartlett	Nickelodeon Animation Studio; Anivision	Harriet the Spy	Theatrical release
Rock-a-Big Baby	July 25, 1997	Tim Hill	Nickelodeon Animation Studio; Chuckimation; Flying Mallet, Inc.	Good Burger	Theatrical release
Fetch	November 20, 1998	Derek Drymon; Larry Leichliter; Robert Porter	Nickelodeon Animation Studio; Rough Draft Korea Co., Ltd.	The Rugrats Movie	Theatrical release
Edwurd Fudwupper Fibbed Big	November 11, 2000	Berkeley Breathed	Threshold Digital Research Labs	Rugrats in Paris: The Movie	Limited festival and theatrical release
Big Nate: Bad Hamster	July 15, 2022	Colin Heck; Jim Mortensen; Kyle Neswald	Xentrix Studio	Paws of Fury: The Legend of Hank	Theatrical release
Dora and the Fantastical Creatures	September 29, 2023	William Mata	Nickelodeon Animation Studio; Duncan Studio	Paw Patrol: The Mighty Movie	Theatrical release
SpongeBob SquarePants: Order Up	July 18, 2025	Sean Charmatz	Nickelodeon Animation Studio; Rough Draft Korea	Smurfs	Theatrical release
Teenage Mutant Ninja Turtles: Chrome Alone 2 – Lost in New Jersey	December 19, 2025	Kent Seki	Mikros Animation	The SpongeBob Movie: Search for SquarePants	Theatrical release

== Cancelled or inactive projects ==
Title	Status	Description
Untitled Ren & Stimpy animated film	Cancelled	In May 1993, Nickelodeon announced a two-year picture deal with 20th Century Fox to produce some of its films, including its IPs such as the aforementioned Ren & Stimpy, though it was reconsidered as an ill fit for the children's market overall, and would have likely ran into creative issues with creator John Kricfalusi (who would be forced out several months after the deal was announced). Fox's film deal with Nick expired when Viacom purchased Paramount Pictures in 1994, leaving the latter to distribute and co-produce the network's theatrically released films.
Untitled Doug animated film	Franchise shifted to Disney	Nickelodeon was also making a Doug film adaptation in 1993 when they made a deal with 20th Century Fox to make films based on their properties along with other films based on other Nickelodeon properties. When Viacom acquired Paramount Pictures in 1994, the idea was killed and the deal ended quietly the next year. In 1996, the show's studio, Jumbo Pictures was acquired by Disney and a film based on the Disney version of the series (known as Disney's Doug to differentiate from the original series) was released by Walt Disney Pictures in 1999, Doug's 1st Movie.
Elmo Aardvark film adaptation	Cancelled	Shortly after the release of the 1995 Elmo Aardvark album, Will Ryan was approached by Nickelodeon Movies about starring the Elmo character in a feature film. Ryan and writer Phil Lollar developed a film treatment for a mockumentary tracing Elmo's fictional history as a cartoon character, from pre-film origins to the present day some hundred years later. The mockumentary, potentially titled The Elmo Aardvark Story, would feature live-action interviews with figures who would add historical credibility, such as golden-age animator Ward Kimball; these would be interspersed with clips of the Elmo cartoons that had supposedly been produced through the ages, animated in period-appropriate styles. Designer Leslie Cabarga prepared promotional art, while Fayard Nicholas, Joanie Sommers, and "Weird Al" Yankovic were in talks to contribute to the soundtrack. However, negotiations with Nickelodeon administrators became slow-moving, and after a lengthy "development hell" period, the project fell through.
Bone	Cancelled	In the late 1990s, an attempt was made through Nickelodeon Movies to produce a film based on the Bone comics. Jeff Smith, author of the Bone comics, stated in a 2003 interview that Nickelodeon had insisted on the Bone cousins being voiced by child actors and wanted the film's soundtrack to include pop songs by the likes of NSYNC. Smith's response was that nobody would insert pop songs in the middle of The Lord of the Rings or The Empire Strikes Back and therefore pop songs should not be placed in Bone either. The film was then developed at Warner Bros. under their Warner Bros. Pictures Animation banner instead. However, in 2019, Netflix purchased the rights to turn Bone into an animated series, which was later cancelled in April 2022 during a reorganization of Netflix Animation.
Prometheus and Bob	Cancelled	A live-action Prometheus and Bob film was announced in 1998 as an adaptation of the KaBlam! series. The film was to be produced by Amy Heckerling and directed by Harald Zwart, but the film later fell through due to lack of interest.
Hey Arnold!: The Jungle Movie	Released as a TV film in 2017	In 1998, Nickelodeon offered Hey Arnold! creator Craig Bartlett a chance to develop two feature-length films based on the series: one as a TV film or direct-to-video and another slated for a theatrical release. Nickelodeon asked Bartlett to do "the biggest idea he could think of" for the theatrical film. Albie Hecht, who was president of Nickelodeon at the time, suggested to Bartlett about making the theatrical feature as a spiritual sequel/follow-up to the episode "Parents Day," and have Arnold try to solve the mystery of what happened to his parents. Though after successful test screenings of the made-for-TV movie titled Arnold Saves the Neighborhood, it was decided that it would instead be given a theatrical release in 2002, under the title of Hey Arnold!: The Movie to attract the attention of the public. Around this time, Hecht also asked Bartlett to produce a special one-hour prequel episode titled "The Journal" that would serve as a lead-in to the second film; the episode debuted on November 11, 2002. Due to the disappointing box office results of the first film, Hey Arnold!: The Jungle Movie was cancelled and ended up leaving the original series with an unresolved cliffhanger ending. The project was later revived as a two-hour TV film that debuted on November 24, 2017.
Untitled Aaahh!!! Real Monsters animated film	Unknown or cancelled	After the box office success of The Rugrats Movie in 1998, Arlene Klasky, Gábor Csupó and Peter Gaffney, the creators of the show decided to making a theatrical adaptation of the animated television series Aaahh!!! Real Monsters after the series finale, to be produced by Nickelodeon Movies and Paramount Pictures. The film was to be animated much like the series, but production of the film was shut down, due to the story being "too dark" for children.
How to Eat Fried Worms	Moved to New Line Cinema	In October 1998, Nickelodeon bought the film rights to the children's book How to Eat Fried Worms from Universal Pictures. The film was to be directed by Thomas Schlamme and produced by Imagine Entertainment. Joe Nussbaum later replaced Schlamme as director in June 2000. Eventually, the film was released by New Line Cinema and Walden Media, with the film's screenwriter Bob Dolman directing his own script, in 2006.
Sector 7	Development hell	In May 2000, Nickelodeon won a bidding war against Pixar in acquiring the film rights to the novel Sector 7 with Darren Aronofsky attached to direct and produce with Good Machine as co-producer. As of March 2019, the project remains in development hell.
Ectokid	Unknown	After the cancellation of Razorline, Barker sold the television and film rights of the Ectokid series to Paramount Pictures and Nickelodeon Movies in 2001. The film was set to have Barker, Don Murphy, and Nickelodeon's Albie Hecht and Julia Pistor as producers, Joe Daley as executive producer, and Karen Rosenfelt overseeing development at Paramount. Barker would also act as executive producer of the television series, with Daley and Murphy as producers. Talking to Daily Variety, Barker explained that his aim was to create "a franchisable world" for the studio, "of great, transcendent beauty; one that reconfigures people's expectations of what ghosts are, of what comes after death." As of November 2018, no further information regarding both the film and the television series surfaced, presumably both were cancelled.
Jimmy Neutron 2	Unknown	In February 2002, a sequel for Jimmy Neutron: Boy Genius was reported in development for a summer 2004 release. Producer Albie Hecht reported to The Los Angeles Times that the sequel "would be made on the same budget as the first, but with a new batch of inventions and adventures in Jimmy's town of Retroville." On June 20, 2002, The Hollywood Reporter reported that writer Kate Boutilier had signed a writing deal with Paramount Pictures and Nickelodeon Movies to write a sequel, but it never materialized. The film was cancelled, because the writers couldn't agree on a story and Alcorn later stated in an interview that "once the TV series came out, there wasn't a lot of incentive to make a movie when fans could simply watch Jimmy Neutron for free at home." When asked about a reboot in 2020, Rob Paulsen stated "Well, I've got to tell you, man. I go all over the world when we don't have the coronavirus, and people love Carl. They love Carl. I don't think it would be a bad thing at all to reboot Jimmy Neutron. I think that's one of those shows that a lot of people would love to see again. It was very good. Really smart. That wouldn't surprise me." In 2025, screenwriter Adam Pava unveiled that a potential new film project based on the characters and the series was in the works since December 2023.
Imaginary Friend	Cancelled	In March 2002, it was announced that Nickelodeon Movies would produce Imaginary Friend, a Gary Ross-helmed live-action/animated hybrid about a boy and his imaginary friend who takes him from the real world to an animated fantasy world. Written by Anne Spielberg, the film would’ve reunited Ross and Spielberg after scripting the 1988 Oscar-nominated Big. Would've been produced by Nickelodeon and Ross' Larger Than Life.
Sequels to Lemony Snicket's A Series of Unfortunate Events	Unknown	Paramount Pictures and Nickelodeon Movies hoped that Lemony Snicket's A Series of Unfortunate Events would become a series like the Harry Potter film series. Jim Carrey thought his character would be good as the basis for a film franchise since it would allow him to dive into a new role. "I don't have a deal [for a sequel], but it's one that I wouldn't mind doing again because there are so many characters," the actor explained in December 2004. "I mean, it's just so much fun. It's so much fun being a bad actor playing a character..." In May 2005, producer Laurie MacDonald said "Lemony Snicket is still something Paramount is interested in pursuing and we're going to be talking with them more." In October 2008, Daniel Handler said that "a sequel does seem to be in the works. Paramount has had quite a few corporate shakeups, which has led to many a delay. Of course, many, many plans in Hollywood come to naught, but I'm assured that another film will be made. Someday. Perhaps." In June 2009, Silberling confirmed he still talked about the project with Handler, and suggested the sequel be a stop motion film, with each film being in a new medium, due to the young lead actors having grown too old to continue their roles. "In an odd way, the best thing you could do is actually have Lemony Snicket say to the audience, 'Okay, we pawned the first film off as a mere dramatization with actors. Now, I'm afraid I'm going to have to show you the real thing.'" The franchise ran a live-action series for 3 seasons on Netflix.
The Anybodies film adaptation	Unknown	In December 2004, Paramount Pictures and Nickelodeon Movies acquired the film rights from the book series of the same name. It was originally set to be released sometime in 2006, but it has not been released since then.
Untitled The Fairly OddParents animated film	Cancelled	In 2005 or 2006, Butch Hartman considered making a theatrical film adaptation of his animated television series The Fairly OddParents after the show's initial cancellation in 2006, to be produced by Paramount Pictures and Nickelodeon Movies and released in November 2007. The film was to be animated in hand-drawn 2D animation much like the main series with a mix of cel-shaded CGI elements as well as previous Nickelodeon fare such as the Rugrats trilogy, Hey Arnold!: The Movie, The Wild Thornberrys Movie and The SpongeBob SquarePants Movie, but was scrapped due to a management change at Paramount although the script was already written. Despite this, Hartman expressed interest in releasing the film for DVD someday, and stated that the script could serve for another TV film of the show. The series ended on July 26, 2017, and Butch Hartman left Nickelodeon in early 2018, seemingly ending any chances of the film happening.
Sequels to The Last Airbender	Cancelled	The Last Airbender, released in 2010, was originally intended to be the first film in a live-action Avatar: The Last Airbender film trilogy each based on the series' three seasons. Due to the poor reception of the film, Nickelodeon and Paramount decided to put further plans for the sequels on hold. In September 2018, a new unrelated live-action remake of the original Avatar: The Last Airbender for Netflix was announced, effectively cancelling any lingering chances of possible sequels to the film.
Mighty Mouse	Moved to Paramount Animation	As early as 2004, Omation Animation Studios and Nickelodeon announced their intention to bring Mighty Mouse (a property held by CBS Corporation) back to the big screen with a CGI Mighty Mouse feature film that was tentatively scheduled to be released sometime in 2013. This film never materialized and the project's fate was unknown until in 2019, when it was confirmed that the project would be revived by Paramount Animation, and that Jon and Erich Hoeber were announced to be the writers for the film.
The Adventures of Tintin: Prisoners of the Sun	Development hell	In November 2011, Steven Spielberg announced a sequel to The Adventures of Tintin and was planned to be released sometime in the future. As of 2019, there have been little to no info about the film, but Peter Jackson is still involved with the project.
Untitled Nicktoons film	Unknown	On January 27, 2016, a crossover film involving various classic Nicktoons characters was reported to be in development. Jared Hess was attached to direct, as well as co-write with his wife Jerusha. The film was said to be similar to Who Framed Roger Rabbit. In a later interview in September 2016, Hess said that the script was complete and submitted for approval. No word on development has been reported since.
Untitled Are You Afraid of the Dark? film	Cancelled	On November 13, 2017, it was announced that a film adaptation and reboot of Are You Afraid of the Dark? was in the works at Paramount Players, with a release date set for October 11, 2019. It writer Gary Dauberman was going to write the screenplay, Matt Kaplan was going to produce, and D.J. Caruso was going to direct the film. The film was removed from Paramount's release schedule on February 27, 2019, and a series revival instead premiered on October 11, 2019.
Smurfs	Moved to Paramount Animation	The 2025 film adaptation of The Smurfs was originally going to be produced by Nickelodeon Movies. Following the release of the first trailer in February 2025, the involvement of Nickelodeon Movies dropped out for unknown reasons.

== Reception ==
=== Box office ===
Film	Budget	North America		Overseas gross	Worldwide gross (unadjusted)	Ref(s)
Film	Budget	Opening	Gross (unadjusted)	Overseas gross	Worldwide gross (unadjusted)	Ref(s)
Harriet the Spy	$12 million	$6,601,651	$26,570,048	—N/a	$26,570,048	
Good Burger	$8.5 million	$7,058,333	$23,712,993	—N/a	$23,712,993	
The Rugrats Movie	$24 million	$27,321,470	$100,494,675	$40,400,000	$140,894,675	
Snow Day	$13 million	$14,331,819	$60,020,107	$2,444,624	$62,464,731	
Rugrats in Paris: The Movie	$30 million	$22,718,184	$76,507,756	$26,783,375	$103,291,131	
Jimmy Neutron: Boy Genius	$30 million	$13,832,786	$80,936,232	$22,056,304	$102,992,536	
Clockstoppers	$26 million	$10,108,333	$36,989,956	$1,803,327	$38,793,283	
Hey Arnold!: The Movie	$3 million	$5,706,332	$13,728,902	$1,520,406	$15,249,308	
The Wild Thornberrys Movie	$25 million	$6,013,847	$40,108,697	$20,586,040	$60,694,737	
Rugrats Go Wild	$25 million	$11,556,869	$39,402,572	$15,847,924	$55,250,496	
The SpongeBob SquarePants Movie	$30 million	$32,018,216	$85,417,988	$55,649,139	$141,067,127	
Lemony Snicket's A Series of Unfortunate Events	$140 million	$30,061,756	$118,634,549	$92,833,686	$211,468,235	
Mad Hot Ballroom	$500,000	$45,348	$8,117,961	$986,366	$9,104,327	
Yours, Mine & Ours	$45 million	$17,461,108	$53,412,862	$19,250,061	$72,662,923	
Nacho Libre	$35 million	$28,309,599	$80,197,993	$19,057,467	$99,255,460	
Barnyard	$51 million	$15,820,864	$72,637,803	$44,117,277	$116,755,080	
Charlotte's Web	$85 million	$11,457,353	$82,985,708	$65,978,114	$148,963,822	
The Spiderwick Chronicles	$90 million	$19,004,058	$71,195,053	$92,975,274	$164,170,327	
Angus, Thongs and Perfect Snogging	—N/a	—N/a	—N/a	$14,924,998	$14,924,998	
Hotel for Dogs	$35 million	$17,012,212	$73,034,460	$44,218,118	$117,252,578	
Imagine That	$55 million	$5,503,519	$16,123,323	$6,861,871	$22,985,194	
The Last Airbender	$150 million	$40,325,019	$131,772,187	$187,941,694	$319,713,881	
Rango	$135 million	$38,079,323	$123,477,607	$122,246,996	$245,724,603	
The Adventures of Tintin	$135 million	$9,720,993	$77,591,831	$296,402,120	$373,993,951	
Fun Size	$14 million	$4,101,017	$9,409,538	$2,007,824	$11,417,362	
Teenage Mutant Ninja Turtles	$125 million	$65,575,105	$191,204,754	$293,800,000	$485,004,754	
The SpongeBob Movie: Sponge Out of Water	$74 million	$55,365,012	$162,994,032	$162,192,000	$325,186,032	
Teenage Mutant Ninja Turtles: Out of the Shadows	$135 million	$35,316,382	$82,051,601	$163,572,247	$245,623,848	
Monster Trucks	$125 million	$10,950,705	$33,370,166	$31,123,749	$64,493,915	
Wonder Park	$90 million	$15,853,646	$45,216,793	$74,342,317	$119,559,110	
Dora and the Lost City of Gold	$49 million	$17,431,588	$60,477,943	$60,119,165	$120,597,108	
Playing with Fire	$29.9 million	$12,723,781	$44,451,847	$24,960,578	$69,412,425	
The SpongeBob Movie: Sponge on the Run	$60 million	$865,824	$4,810,790	—N/a	$4,810,790	
Paw Patrol: The Movie	$26 million	$13,148,340	$40,127,371	$104,200,000	$144,327,371	
Paws of Fury: The Legend of Hank	$45 million	$6,321,423	$17,811,382	$24,695,183	$42,506,565	
Teenage Mutant Ninja Turtles: Mutant Mayhem	$70 million	$28,007,544	$118,566,254	$61,900,000	$180,462,816	
Paw Patrol: The Mighty Movie	$30 million	$22,764,354	$65,343,309	$139,755,560	$205,098,869	
Under the Boardwalk	—N/a	—N/a	—N/a	—N/a	—N/a	
The SpongeBob Movie: Search for SquarePants	$64 million	$15,611,344	$71,068,170	$96,867,062	$167,935,232	
Avatar Aang: The Last Airbender	$80 million	—N/a	—N/a	—N/a	—N/a	
Paw Patrol: The Dino Movie	$40 million	$52,447,322	—N/a	$99,100,000	$151,547,322	

=== Critical and public response ===
Film	Rotten Tomatoes	Metacritic	CinemaScore
Harriet the Spy	48% (31 reviews)	—N/a	B+
Good Burger	33% (45 reviews)	41 (17 critic reviews)	—N/a
The Rugrats Movie	59% (51 reviews)	62 (20 critic reviews)	A−
Snow Day	29% (66 reviews)	34 (22 critic reviews)	B−
Rugrats in Paris: The Movie	76% (75 reviews)	62 (25 critic reviews)	A−
Jimmy Neutron: Boy Genius	74% (76 reviews)	66 (21 critic reviews)	A−
Clockstoppers	29% (86 reviews)	40 (24 critic reviews)	B+
Hey Arnold!: The Movie	29% (78 reviews)	47 (23 critic reviews)	B+
The Wild Thornberrys Movie	80% (88 reviews)	69 (25 critic reviews)	A
Rugrats Go Wild	39% (89 reviews)	38 (27 critic reviews)	A−
The SpongeBob SquarePants Movie	68% (127 reviews)	66 (32 critic reviews)	B+
Lemony Snicket's A Series of Unfortunate Events	72% (160 reviews)	62 (37 critic reviews)	B+
Mad Hot Ballroom	84% (121 reviews)	71 (32 critic reviews)	—N/a
Yours, Mine & Ours	6% (106 reviews)	38 (25 critic reviews)	A−
Nacho Libre	40% (166 reviews)	52 (36 critic reviews)	B+
Barnyard	22% (95 reviews)	42 (24 critic reviews)	B+
Charlotte's Web	79% (148 reviews)	68 (28 critic reviews)	A
The Spiderwick Chronicles	81% (149 reviews)	62 (30 critic reviews)	A−
Angus, Thongs and Perfect Snogging	73% (26 reviews)	—N/a	—N/a
Hotel for Dogs	46% (124 reviews)	51 (25 critic reviews)	A−
Imagine That	41% (120 reviews)	54 (23 critic reviews)	A−
The Last Airbender	5% (192 reviews)	20 (33 critic reviews)	C
Rango	88% (288 reviews)	75 (35 critic reviews)	C+
The Adventures of Tintin	75% (236 reviews)	68 (40 critic reviews)	A−
Fun Size	25% (73 reviews)	37 (25 critic reviews)	B
Teenage Mutant Ninja Turtles	21% (165 reviews)	31 (33 critic reviews)	B
The SpongeBob Movie: Sponge Out of Water	81% (104 reviews)	62 (27 critic reviews)	B
Teenage Mutant Ninja Turtles: Out of the Shadows	37% (174 reviews)	40 (30 critic reviews)	A−
Monster Trucks	32% (97 reviews)	41 (23 critic reviews)	A
Wonder Park	34% (108 reviews)	45 (22 critic reviews)	B+
Dora and the Lost City of Gold	85% (158 reviews)	63 (23 critic reviews)	A
Playing with Fire	24% (76 reviews)	24 (16 critic reviews)	B+
The SpongeBob Movie: Sponge on the Run	67% (73 reviews)	65 (20 critic reviews)	—N/a
Paw Patrol: The Movie	80% (51 reviews)	50 (14 critic reviews)	A−
The Loud House Movie	—N/a	—N/a	—N/a
The J Team	—N/a	—N/a	—N/a
Paws of Fury: The Legend of Hank	54% (61 reviews)	45 (13 critic reviews)	A−
Rise of the Teenage Mutant Ninja Turtles: The Movie	79% (14 reviews)	61 (5 critic reviews)	—N/a
Blue's Big City Adventure	83% (6 reviews)	—N/a	—N/a
Fantasy Football	33% (6 reviews)	—N/a	—N/a
Snow Day	—N/a	—N/a	—N/a
Zoey 102	56% (9 reviews)	—N/a	—N/a
Teenage Mutant Ninja Turtles: Mutant Mayhem	96% (243 reviews)	74 (47 critic reviews)	A
A Really Haunted Loud House	—N/a (1 review)	—N/a	—N/a
Paw Patrol: The Mighty Movie	72% (46 reviews)	52 (8 critic reviews)	A
Monster High 2	—N/a (4 reviews)	—N/a	—N/a
Under the Boardwalk	—N/a (4 reviews)	—N/a	—N/a
Good Burger 2	59% (5 reviews)	—N/a	—N/a
Baby Shark's Big Movie!	—N/a	—N/a	—N/a
The Thundermans Return	—N/a	—N/a	—N/a
The Casagrandes Movie	—N/a	—N/a	—N/a
No Time to Spy: A Loud House Movie	—N/a	—N/a	—N/a
Saving Bikini Bottom: The Sandy Cheeks Movie	56% (16 reviews)	—N/a	—N/a
Henry Danger: The Movie	—N/a	—N/a	—N/a
Plankton: The Movie	77% (13 reviews)	61 (5 critic reviews)	—N/a
Dora and the Search for Sol Dorado	92% (12 reviews)	—N/a	—N/a
A Loud House Christmas Movie: Naughty or Nice	—N/a	—N/a	—N/a
The SpongeBob Movie: Search for SquarePants	83% (48 reviews)	66 (16 critic reviews)	A−
My Weird School	—N/a	—N/a	—N/a
Avatar Aang: The Last Airbender	89% (27 reviews)	68 (11 critic reviews)	—N/a
Paw Patrol: The Dino Movie	81% (26 reviews)	47 (4 reviews)	A

== Accolades ==
=== Academy Awards ===
Year	Category	Film	Recipient(s)	Result
2002	Best Animated Feature	Jimmy Neutron: Boy Genius	Steve Oedekerk and John A. Davis	Nominated
2003	Best Original Song	The Wild Thornberrys Movie	Paul Simon ("Father and Daughter")	Nominated
2005	Best Makeup	Lemony Snicket's A Series of Unfortunate Events	Valli O'Reilly and Bill Corso	Won
2005	Best Original Score	Lemony Snicket's A Series of Unfortunate Events	Thomas Newman	Nominated
2005	Best Art Direction	Lemony Snicket's A Series of Unfortunate Events	Rick Heinrichs and Cheryl Carasik	Nominated
2005	Best Costume Design	Lemony Snicket's A Series of Unfortunate Events	Colleen Atwood	Nominated
2012	Best Animated Feature	Rango	Gore Verbinski	Won
2012	Best Original Score	The Adventures of Tintin	John Williams	Nominated

=== ACE Eddie Awards ===
Year	Category	Film	Recipient(s)	Result
2024	Best Edited Animated Feature Film (Theatrical or Non-Theatrical)	Teenage Mutant Ninja Turtles: Mutant Mayhem	Greg Levitan	Nominated

=== ADG Excellence in Production Design Awards ===
Year	Category	Film	Recipient(s)	Result
2024	Excellence in Production Design for an Animated Film	Teenage Mutant Ninja Turtles: Mutant Mayhem	—N/a	Nominated

=== Alliance of Women Film Journalists ===
Year	Category	Film	Recipient(s)	Result
2012	Best Animated Film	Rango	—N/a	Nominated
2012	Best Animated Female	Rango	Isla Fisher	Nominated
2024	Best Animated Film	Teenage Mutant Ninja Turtles: Mutant Mayhem	—N/a	Nominated
2024	Best Animated Female	Teenage Mutant Ninja Turtles: Mutant Mayhem	Ayo Edebiri	Nominated

=== Annie Awards ===
Year	Category	Film	Recipient(s)	Result
2005	Best Animated Feature	The SpongeBob SquarePants Movie	—N/a	Nominated
2005	Directing in an Animated Feature Production	The SpongeBob SquarePants Movie	Stephen Hillenburg	Nominated
2005	Music in an Animated Feature Production	The SpongeBob SquarePants Movie	Gregor Narholz	Nominated
2012	Animated Effects in an Animated Production	Rango	Chase Cooper	Nominated
2012	Animated Effects in an Animated Production	Rango	Willi Geiger	Nominated
2012	Character Design in a Feature Production	Rango	Mark "Crash" McCreery	Won
2012	Directing in a Feature Production	Rango	Gore Verbinski	Nominated
2012	Editing in a Feature Production	Rango	Craig Wood	Won
2012	Storyboarding in a Feature Production	Rango	Delia Gosman	Nominated
2012	Storyboarding in a Feature Production	Rango	Josh Hayes	Nominated
2012	Writing in a Feature Production	Rango	John Logan, Gore Verbinski, James Byrkit	Won
2012	Best Animated Feature	Rango	—N/a	Won
2012	Best Animated Feature	The Adventures of Tintin	—N/a	Nominated
2012	Animated Effects in an Animated Production	The Adventures of Tintin	Kevin Romond	Won
2012	Editing in a Feature Production	The Adventures of Tintin	Michael Kahn	Nominated
2012	Music in a Feature Production	The Adventures of Tintin	John Williams	Won
2012	Writing in a Feature Production	The Adventures of Tintin	Steve Moffat, Edgar Wright, Joe Cornish	Nominated
2016	Animated Effects in an Animated Production	The SpongeBob Movie: Sponge Out of Water	Brice Mallier, Paul Buckley, Brent Droog, Alex Whyte, Jonothan Freisler	Nominated
2016	Voice Acting in an Animated Feature	The SpongeBob Movie: Sponge Out of Water	Tom Kenny	Nominated
2023	Outstanding Achievement for Character Design in an Animated Feature Production	Rise of the Teenage Mutant Ninja Turtles: The Movie	Ida Hem	Nominated
2024	Best Animated Feature	Teenage Mutant Ninja Turtles: Mutant Mayhem	—N/a	Nominated
2024	Outstanding Achievement for Directing in a Feature Production	Teenage Mutant Ninja Turtles: Mutant Mayhem	Jeff Rowe, Kyle Spears	Nominated
2024	Outstanding Achievement for Writing in a Feature Production	Teenage Mutant Ninja Turtles: Mutant Mayhem	Seth Rogen, Evan Goldberg, Jeff Rowe, Dan Hernandez, Benji Samit	Nominated
2024	Outstanding Achievement for Music in a Feature Production	Teenage Mutant Ninja Turtles: Mutant Mayhem	Trent Reznor, Atticus Ross	Nominated
2024	Outstanding Achievement for Production Design in an Animated Feature Production	Teenage Mutant Ninja Turtles: Mutant Mayhem	Yashar Kassai, Arthur Fong, Tiffany Lam	Nominated
2024	Outstanding Achievement for Editorial in a Feature Production	Teenage Mutant Ninja Turtles: Mutant Mayhem	Greg Levitan, Illya Quinteros, David Croomes, Myra Owyang	Nominated
2025	Outstanding Achievement for Storyboarding in an Animated Feature Production	Saving Bikini Bottom: The Sandy Cheeks Movie	Piero Piluso	Nominated
2026	Best Special Production	A Loud House Christmas Movie: Naughty or Nice	—N/a	Nominated
2026	Best Character Design - Feature	The SpongeBob Movie: Search for SquarePants	Adam Paloian, Thaddeus Couldron, Alvi Ramirez	Nominated

=== Art Directors Guild Awards ===
Year	Category	Film	Recipient(s)	Result
2012	Fantasy Film	The Adventures of Tintin	—N/a	Nominated
2026	Best Animated Feature Film	The SpongeBob Movie: Search for SquarePants	Sean Haworth and Pablo R. Mayer	Nominated

=== Artios Awards ===
Year	Category	Film	Recipient(s)	Result
2024	Outstanding Achievement in Casting – Feature Animation	Teenage Mutant Ninja Turtles: Mutant Mayhem	Rich Delia, Adam Richards	Nominated

=== ASCAP Film and Television Music Awards ===
Year	Category	Film	Recipient(s)	Result
2005	Top Box Office Films	The SpongeBob SquarePants Movie	Gregor Narholz	Won

=== Astra Film and Creative Arts Awards ===
Year	Category	Film	Recipient(s)	Result
2024	Best Animated Feature	Teenage Mutant Ninja Turtles: Mutant Mayhem	—N/a	Nominated

=== Austin Film Critics Association ===
Year	Category	Film	Recipient(s)	Result
2024	Best Animated Film	Teenage Mutant Ninja Turtles: Mutant Mayhem	—N/a	Nominated
2024	Best Voice Acting/Animated/Digital Performance	Teenage Mutant Ninja Turtles: Mutant Mayhem	Ayo Edebiri	Nominated
2024	Robert R. "Bobby" McCurdy Memorial Breakthrough Artist Award	Teenage Mutant Ninja Turtles: Mutant Mayhem	Ayo Edebiri	Nominated

=== BAFTA Awards ===
Year	Category	Film	Recipient(s)	Result
2012	Best Animated Film	Rango	Gore Verbinski	Won
2012	Best Animated Film	The Adventures of Tintin	Steven Spielberg	Nominated
2012	Best Special Effects	The Adventures of Tintin	Joe Letteri, Keith Miller, Wayne Stables and Jamie Beard	Nominated

=== Black Reel Awards ===
Year	Category	Film	Recipient(s)	Result
2024	Outstanding Voice Performance	Teenage Mutant Ninja Turtles: Mutant Mayhem	Ayo Edebiri	Nominated

=== Blockbuster Entertainment Awards ===
Year	Category	Film	Recipient(s)	Result
2001	Favorite Song from a Movie (Internet Only)	Snow Day	Another Dumb Blonde performed by Hoku	Nominated

=== BMI Film & TV Awards ===
Year	Category	Film	Recipient(s)	Result
2012	Film Music Award	The Adventures of Tintin	John Williams	Won

=== Boston Society of Film Critics ===
Year	Category	Film	Recipient(s)	Result
2023	Best Animated Film	Teenage Mutant Ninja Turtles: Mutant Mayhem	—N/a (Award shared with Spider-Man: Across the Spider-Verse, Robot Dreams and The Peasants)	Runner-up

=== Canadian Screen Awards ===
Year	Category	Film	Recipient(s)	Result
2022	Best Sound Editing	Paw Patrol: The Movie	J. R. Fountain, Nelson Ferreira, Mark Dejczak, Robert Hegedus, Steve Hammond	Nominated
2022	Best Sound Mixing	Paw Patrol: The Movie	Bernard Gariépy Strobl, J. R. Fountain and Erik Culp	Nominated
2022	Golden Screen Award	Paw Patrol: The Movie	Spin Master Entertainment	Won
2024	Golden Screen Award	Paw Patrol: The Mighty Movie	Spin Master Entertainment	Won
2024	Best Sound Editing	Paw Patrol: The Mighty Movie	J. R. Fountain	Nominated
2024	Best Sound Mixing	Paw Patrol: The Mighty Movie	Bernard Gariépy Strobl and J.R. Fountain	Nominated

=== Chicago Film Critics Association ===
Year	Category	Film	Recipient(s)	Result
2023	Best Animated Feature	Teenage Mutant Ninja Turtles: Mutant Mayhem	—N/a	Nominated

=== Children's & Family Emmy Awards ===
Year	Category	Film	Recipient(s)	Result
2023	Outstanding Special Class Animated Program	Rise of the Teenage Mutant Ninja Turtles: The Movie	—N/a	Nominated
2023	Outstanding Sound Editing and Sound Mixing for an Animated Program	Rise of the Teenage Mutant Ninja Turtles: The Movie	Jeff Shiffman, Jacob Cook, Jessey Drake, Brad Meyer, Xinyue Yu, Carol Ma	Nominated
2023	Individual Achievement in Animation	Rise of the Teenage Mutant Ninja Turtles: The Movie	Carl Anders Beu	Won

=== Cinema Audio Society Awards ===
Year	Category	Film	Recipient(s)	Result
2024	Outstanding Achievement in Sound Mixing for Motion Picture – Animated	Teenage Mutant Ninja Turtles: Mutant Mayhem	Doc Kane, Michael Semanick, Mark Mangini, Trent Reznor, Atticus Ross, Chris Cirino, Chelsea Body	Nominated

=== Critics' Choice Movie Awards ===
Year	Category	Film	Recipient(s)	Result
2012	Best Animated Feature	Rango	—N/a	Won
2012	Best Animated Feature	The Adventures of Tintin	—N/a	Nominated
2024	Best Animated Feature	Teenage Mutant Ninja Turtles: Mutant Mayhem	—N/a	Nominated

=== Critics' Choice Super Awards ===
Year	Category	Film	Recipient(s)	Result
2024	Best Superhero Movie	Teenage Mutant Ninja Turtles: Mutant Mayhem	—N/a	Nominated
2024	Best Actress in a Superhero Movie	Teenage Mutant Ninja Turtles: Mutant Mayhem	Ayo Edebiri	Nominated

=== Directors Guild of Canada ===
Year	Category	Film	Recipient(s)	Result
2021	Best Sound Editing - Feature Film	Paw Patrol: The Movie	J.R. Fountain, Nelson Ferreira, Mark Dejczak, Rob Hegedus, Claudia Pinto, Jack Madigan	Nominated

=== Empire Awards ===
Year	Category	Film	Recipient(s)	Result
2012	The Art of 3D	The Adventures of Tintin	—N/a	Won

=== Florida Film Critics Circle ===
Year	Category	Film	Recipient(s)	Result
2012	Best Animated Film	The Adventures of Tintin	—N/a	Won
2023	Best Animated Film	Teenage Mutant Ninja Turtles: Mutant Mayhem	—N/a	Nominated

=== Georgia Film Critics Association ===
Year	Category	Film	Recipient(s)	Result
2024	Best Animated Film	Teenage Mutant Ninja Turtles: Mutant Mayhem	—N/a	Nominated

=== Golden Globe Awards ===
Year	Category	Film	Recipient(s)	Result
2003	Best Original Song – Motion Picture	The Wild Thornberrys Movie	Paul Simon ("Father and Daughter")	Nominated
2012	Best Animated Feature Film	Rango	Gore Verbinski	Nominated
2012	Best Animated Feature Film	The Adventures of Tintin	Steven Spielberg	Won

=== Golden Raspberry Awards ===
Year	Category	Film	Recipient(s)	Result
2010	Worst Actor	Imagine That	Eddie Murphy	Nominated
2010	Worst Actor of the Decade	Imagine That	Eddie Murphy (also for The Adventures of Pluto Nash, I Spy, Meet Dave, Norbit and Showtime)	Won
2011	Worst Picture	The Last Airbender	—N/a	Won
2011	Worst Supporting Actor	The Last Airbender	Jackson Rathbone (also for The Twilight Saga: Eclipse)	Won
2011	Worst Supporting Actor	The Last Airbender	Dev Patel	Nominated
2011	Worst Supporting Actress	The Last Airbender	Nicola Peltz	Nominated
2011	Worst Screen Ensemble	The Last Airbender	Entire cast	Nominated
2011	Worst Prequel, Remake, Rip-off or Sequel	The Last Airbender	—N/a	Nominated
2011	Worst Director	The Last Airbender	M. Night Shyamalan	Won
2011	Worst Screenplay	The Last Airbender	M. Night Shyamalan	Won
2011	Worst Eye-Gouging Misuse of 3D	The Last Airbender	—N/a	Won
2015	Worst Picture	Teenage Mutant Ninja Turtles	—N/a	Nominated
2015	Worst Supporting Actress	Teenage Mutant Ninja Turtles	Megan Fox	Won
2015	Worst Prequel, Remake, Rip-off or Sequel	Teenage Mutant Ninja Turtles	—N/a	Nominated
2015	Worst Director	Teenage Mutant Ninja Turtles	Jonathan Liebesman	Nominated
2015	Worst Screenplay	Teenage Mutant Ninja Turtles	Josh Appelbaum, André Nemec, Evan Daugherty	Nominated
2017	Worst Prequel, Remake, Rip-off or Sequel	Teenage Mutant Ninja Turtles: Out of the Shadows	—N/a	Nominated
2017	Worst Supporting Actress	Teenage Mutant Ninja Turtles: Out of the Shadows	Megan Fox	Nominated

=== Golden Reel Awards ===
Year	Category	Film	Recipient(s)	Result
2023	Outstanding Achievement in Sound Editing – Non-Theatrical Animation	Rise of the Teenage Mutant Ninja Turtles: The Movie	Jeff Shiffman, Jessey Drake, Brad Meyer, Xinyue Yu, Carol Ma	Won

=== Golden Trailer Awards ===
Year	Category	Film	Recipient(s)	Result
2005	Most Original	The SpongeBob SquarePants Movie	—N/a	Nominated
2005	Best Animation/Family	The SpongeBob SquarePants Movie	—N/a	Nominated
2012	Best Animation/Family	The Adventures of Tintin	—N/a	Nominated
2012	Best Pre-Show Theatrical Advertising	The Adventures of Tintin	—N/a	Nominated

=== Grammy Awards ===
Year	Category	Film	Recipient(s)	Result
2013	Best Score Soundtrack For Visual Media	The Adventures of Tintin	John Williams	Nominated

=== Heartland International Film Festival ===
Year	Category	Film	Recipient(s)	Result
2023	Truly Moving Picture Award	Teenage Mutant Ninja Turtles: Mutant Mayhem	—N/a	Won

=== Hollywood Music in Media Awards ===
Year	Category	Film	Recipient(s)	Result
2021	Original Song - Animated Film	Paw Patrol: The Movie	"Good Mood" - Karl Johan Schuster, Savan Kotecha, Oscar Görres, Adam Levine	Won
2021	Original Score - Animated Film	The Loud House Movie	Philip White	Nominated
2023	Best Original Song – Animated Film	Paw Patrol: The Mighty Movie	"Down Like That" – Bryson Tiller, Chantry Johnson, Michelle Zarlenga, and Charlie Heath	Nominated

=== Hollywood Professional Association ===
Year	Category	Film	Recipient(s)	Result
2023	Outstanding Color Grading — Animated Theatrical Feature	Teenage Mutant Ninja Turtles: Mutant Mayhem	Mitch Paulson (Company 3)	Nominated
2024	HPA Award for Outstanding Color Grading – Animated Episode or Non-Theatrical Feature	Saving Bikini Bottom: The Sandy Cheeks Movie	Alastor Pan Arnold (Keep Me Posted)	Nominated

=== Houston Film Critics Society ===
Year	Category	Film	Recipient(s)	Result
2012	Best Animated Film	Rango	—N/a	Won
2012	Best Animated Film	The Adventures of Tintin	—N/a	Nominated
2012	Best Original Score	The Adventures of Tintin	John Williams	Nominated
2024	Best Animated Film	Teenage Mutant Ninja Turtles: Mutant Mayhem	—N/a	Nominated

=== ICG Publicists Awards ===
Year	Category	Film	Recipient(s)	Result
2024	Maxwell Weinberg Award for Motion Picture Publicity Campaign	Teenage Mutant Ninja Turtles: Mutant Mayhem	—N/a	Nominated

=== IGN ===
Year	Category	Film	Recipient(s)	Result
2012	Best Animated Movie	Rango	—N/a	Won
2012	Best Animated Movie	The Adventures of Tintin	—N/a	Nominated
2012	Best Movie Actor	The Adventures of Tintin	Andy Serkis	Nominated

=== International Film Music Critics Association ===
Year	Category	Film	Recipient(s)	Result
2011	Film Music Composition of the Year	The Last Airbender	James Newton Howard (For song: "Flow Like Water")	Nominated
2011	Best Original Score for a Fantasy/Science Fiction/Horror film	The Last Airbender	James Newton Howard	Nominated

=== Kansas City Film Critics Circle ===
Year	Category	Film	Recipient(s)	Result
2024	Best Animated Feature	Teenage Mutant Ninja Turtles: Mutant Mayhem	—N/a	Runner-up

=== Kids' Choice Awards ===
==== American Kids' Choice Awards ====
Year	Category	Film	Recipient(s)	Result
1997	Favorite Movie Actress	Harriet the Spy	Rosie O'Donnell	Won
1999	Favorite Movie	The Rugrats Movie	—N/a	Won
2001	Favorite Voice from an Animated Movie	Rugrats in Paris: The Movie	Susan Sarandon	Won
2004	Favorite Voice from an Animated Movie	Rugrats Go Wild	Bruce Willis	Nominated
2005	Favorite Movie Actor	Lemony Snicket's A Series of Unfortunate Events	Jim Carrey	Nominated
2007	Favorite Movie Actor	Nacho Libre	Jack Black	Nominated
2007	Favorite Movie Actress	Charlotte's Web	Dakota Fanning	Won
2012	Favorite Voice from an Animated Movie	Rango	Johnny Depp	Nominated
2015	Favorite Movie	Teenage Mutant Ninja Turtles	—N/a	Nominated
2015	Favorite Movie Actor	Teenage Mutant Ninja Turtles	Will Arnett (also for The Lego Movie)	Nominated
2015	Favorite Movie Actress	Teenage Mutant Ninja Turtles	Megan Fox	Nominated
2015	Favorite Animated Movie	The SpongeBob Movie: Sponge Out of Water	—N/a	Nominated
2017	Favorite Movie	Teenage Mutant Ninja Turtles: Out of the Shadows	—N/a	Nominated
2017	Favorite Movie Actor	Teenage Mutant Ninja Turtles: Out of the Shadows	Will Arnett	Nominated
2017	Favorite Movie Actress	Teenage Mutant Ninja Turtles: Out of the Shadows	Megan Fox	Nominated
2017	#Squad	Teenage Mutant Ninja Turtles: Out of the Shadows	Noel Fisher, Jeremy Howard, Pete Ploszek and Alan Ritchson	Nominated
2022	Favorite Animated Movie	Paw Patrol: The Movie	—N/a	Nominated
2022	Favorite Animated Movie	The SpongeBob Movie: Sponge on the Run	—N/a	Nominated
2022	Favorite Voice from an Animated Movie	The SpongeBob Movie: Sponge on the Run	Awkwafina (also for Raya and the Last Dragon)	Nominated
2022	Favorite Voice from an Animated Movie	The SpongeBob Movie: Sponge on the Run	Tom Kenny	Nominated
2022	Favorite Voice from an Animated Movie	The SpongeBob Movie: Sponge on the Run	Keanu Reeves	Nominated
2024	Favorite Female Voice From an Animated Movie	Paw Patrol: The Mighty Movie	Kristen Bell	Nominated
2024	Favorite Female Voice From an Animated Movie	Paw Patrol: The Mighty Movie	Mckenna Grace	Nominated
2024	Favorite Animated Movie	Paw Patrol: The Mighty Movie	—N/a	Nominated
2024	Favorite Animated Movie	Teenage Mutant Ninja Turtles: Mutant Mayhem	—N/a	Nominated
2024	Favorite Male Voice From an Animated Movie	Teenage Mutant Ninja Turtles: Mutant Mayhem	Brady Noon	Nominated
2024	Favorite Male Voice From an Animated Movie	Teenage Mutant Ninja Turtles: Mutant Mayhem	Jackie Chan	Nominated
2024	Favorite Female Voice From an Animated Movie	Teenage Mutant Ninja Turtles: Mutant Mayhem	Ayo Edebiri	Nominated
2025	Favorite Animated Movie	Plankton: The Movie	—N/a	Nominated
2026	Favorite Animated Movie	The SpongeBob Movie: Search for SquarePants	—N/a	Pending
2026	Favorite Animated Movie	Avatar Aang: The Last Airbender	—N/a	Pending
2026	Favorite Animated Movie	Paw Patrol: The Dino Movie	—N/a	Pending
2026	Favorite Female Animated Voice from a Movie	Paw Patrol: The Dino Movie	Mckenna Grace	Pending
2026	Favorite Male Animated Voice from a Movie	The SpongeBob Movie: Search for SquarePants	Tom Kenny	Pending
2026	Favorite Villain	The SpongeBob Movie: Search for SquarePants	Mark Hamill as The Flying Dutchman	Pending
2026	Favorite Song from a Movie	The SpongeBob Movie: Search for SquarePants	Ice Spice ("Big Guy")	Pending

==== Australian Kids' Choice Awards ====
Year	Category	Film	Recipient(s)	Result
2005	Fave Movie	The SpongeBob SquarePants Movie	—N/a	Won

=== Kidscreen Awards ===
Year	Category	Film	Recipient(s)	Result
2025	Best One-Off, Special or TV Movie - Kids	No Time to Spy: A Loud House Movie	—N/a	Nominated
2026	Best Acting - Creative Talent and Performance	Dora and the Search for Sol Dorado	Samantha Lorraine	Won

=== Leo Awards ===
Year	Category	Film	Recipient(s)	Result
2024	Best Voice Performance Animation Program	Paw Patrol: The Mighty Movie	Christian Convery	Nominated

=== London Film Critics' Circle ===
Year	Category	Film	Recipient(s)	Result
2024	Animated Film of the Year	Teenage Mutant Ninja Turtles: Mutant Mayhem	—N/a	Nominated

=== Los Angeles Film Critics Association ===
Year	Category	Film	Recipient(s)	Result
2012	Best Animated Film	Rango	—N/a	Won
2012	Best Animated Film	The Adventures of Tintin	—N/a	Nominated

=== MTV Russia Movie Awards ===
Year	Category	Film	Recipient(s)	Result
2006	Best Cartoon	The SpongeBob SquarePants Movie	—N/a	Nominated

=== NAACP Image Awards ===
Year	Category	Film	Recipient(s)	Result
2024	Outstanding Animated Motion Picture	Teenage Mutant Ninja Turtles: Mutant Mayhem	—N/a	Nominated

=== Online Film Critics Society ===
Year	Category	Film	Recipient(s)	Result
2012	Best Animated Feature	Rango	—N/a	Won
2012	Best Animated Feature	The Adventures of Tintin	—N/a	Nominated

=== People's Choice Awards ===
Year	Category	Film	Recipient(s)	Result
2005	Favorite Animated Movie	The SpongeBob SquarePants Movie	—N/a	Nominated
2012	Favorite Animated Movie Voice	Rango	Johnny Depp	Won

=== Producers Guild of America Award ===
Year	Category	Film	Recipient(s)	Result
2012	Outstanding Producer of Animated Theatrical Motion Pictures	Rango	John B. Carls, Gore Verbinski	Nominated
2012	Outstanding Producer of Animated Theatrical Motion Pictures	The Adventures of Tintin	Peter Jackson, Kathleen Kennedy, Steven Spielberg	Won
2024	Outstanding Producer of Animated Theatrical Motion Pictures	Teenage Mutant Ninja Turtles: Mutant Mayhem	—N/a	Nominated

=== Satellite Awards ===
Year	Category	Film	Recipient(s)	Result
2005	Best Documentary Feature	Mad Hot Ballroom	—N/a	Won
2011	Best Motion Picture, Animated or Mixed Media	Rango	—N/a	Nominated
2011	Best Motion Picture, Animated or Mixed Media	The Adventures of Tintin	—N/a	Won
2011	Best Adapted Screenplay	The Adventures of Tintin	Steven Moffat, Edgar Wright and Joe Cornish	Nominated
2024	Best Animated or Mixed Media Feature	Teenage Mutant Ninja Turtles: Mutant Mayhem	—N/a	Nominated

=== Saturn Awards ===
Year	Category	Film	Recipient(s)	Result
2005	Saturn Award for Best Fantasy Film	Lemony Snicket's A Series of Unfortunate Events	—N/a	Nominated
2005	Saturn Award for Best Make-Up	Lemony Snicket's A Series of Unfortunate Events	Valli O'Reilly and Bill Corso	Nominated
2005	Saturn Award for Best DVD Special Edition Release	Lemony Snicket's A Series of Unfortunate Events	—N/a	Nominated
2007	Saturn Award for Best Fantasy Film	Charlotte's Web	—N/a	Nominated
2007	Saturn Award for Best Special Effects	Charlotte's Web	Karin Joy, John Andrew Berton, Jr., Blair Clark and John Dietz	Nominated
2008	Saturn Award for Best Fantasy Film	The Spiderwick Chronicles	—N/a	Nominated
2008	Saturn Award for Best Performance by a Younger Actor	The Spiderwick Chronicles	Freddie Highmore	Nominated
2012	Saturn Award for Best Animated Film	Rango	—N/a	Nominated
2012	Saturn Award for Best Animated Film	The Adventures of Tintin	—N/a	Nominated
2012	Saturn Award for Best Director	The Adventures of Tintin	Steven Spielberg	Nominated
2012	Saturn Award for Best Music	The Adventures of Tintin	John Williams	Nominated
2012	Saturn Award for Best Special Effects	The Adventures of Tintin	Matt Aiken, Jamie Beard, Joe Letteri, Keith Miller, Wayne Stables and Matthias Menz	Nominated
2012	Saturn Award for Best Editing	The Adventures of Tintin	Michael Kahn	Nominated
2012	Saturn Award for Best Production Design	The Adventures of Tintin	Kim Sinclair	Nominated
2024	Saturn Award for Best Animated Film	Teenage Mutant Ninja Turtles: Mutant Mayhem	—N/a	Nominated

=== Seattle Film Critics Society ===
Year	Category	Film	Recipient(s)	Result
2024	Best Animated Feature	Teenage Mutant Ninja Turtles: Mutant Mayhem	—N/a	Nominated

=== St. Louis Film Critics Association ===
Year	Category	Film	Recipient(s)	Result
2023	Best Animated Film	Teenage Mutant Ninja Turtles: Mutant Mayhem	—N/a	Nominated

=== Stinkers Bad Movie Awards ===
Year	Category	Film	Recipient(s)	Result
2007	Worst Movie Title	Barnyard	—N/a	Nominated
2007	Worst Animated Film	Barnyard	—N/a	Nominated

=== Teen Choice Awards ===
Year	Category	Film	Recipient(s)	Result
2010	Choice Summer Movie	The Last Airbender	—N/a	Nominated
2012	Choice Movie Animated Voice	Rango	Johnny Depp	Won
2016	Choice Summer Movie Star: Female	Teenage Mutant Ninja Turtles: Out of the Shadows	Megan Fox	Nominated
2016	Choice Summer Movie Star: Male	Teenage Mutant Ninja Turtles: Out of the Shadows	Stephen Amell	Nominated

=== Visual Effects Society ===
Year	Category	Film	Recipient(s)	Result
2005	Outstanding Performance by an Animated Character in a Live Action Motion Picture	Lemony Snicket's A Series of Unfortunate Events	Rick O'Connor, Martin Murphy, Indira Guettieri, Sam Breach	Nominated
2009	Outstanding Animated Character in a Live Action Feature Motion Picture	The Spiderwick Chronicles	Todd Labonte, Michael Brunet, Nathan Fredenburg, Aharon Bourland	Nominated
2012	Outstanding Visual Effects in an Animated Feature Motion Picture	Rango	Tim Alexander, Hal Hickel, Jacqui Lopez, Katie Lynch	Won
2012	Outstanding Animated Character in an Animated Feature Motion Picture	Rango	Frank Gravatt, Kevin Martel, Brian Paik, Steve Walton	Won
2012	Outstanding Created Environment in an Animated Feature Motion Picture	Rango	John Bell, Polly Ing, Martin Murphy, Russell Paul	Won
2012	Outstanding Virtual Cinematography in an Animated Feature Motion Picture	Rango	Colin Benoit, Philippe Rebours, Nelson Sepulveda, Nick Walker	Won
2012	Outstanding Visual Effects in an Animated Feature Motion Picture	The Adventures of Tintin	Jamie Beard, Joe Letteri, Meredith Meyer-Nichols, Eileen Moran	Nominated
2012	Outstanding Animated Character in an Animated Feature Motion Picture	The Adventures of Tintin	Gino Acevedo, Gustav Ahren, Jamie Beard, Simon Clutterbuck (For Tintin)	Nominated
2012	Outstanding Created Environment in an Animated Feature Motion Picture	The Adventures of Tintin	Hamish Beachman, Adam King, Wayne Stables, Mark Tait (For Bagghar)	Nominated
2012	Outstanding Created Environment in an Animated Feature Motion Picture	The Adventures of Tintin	Matt Aitken, Jeff Capogreco, Jason Lazaroff, Alessandro Mozzato (For Docks)	Nominated
2012	Outstanding Created Environment in an Animated Feature Motion Picture	The Adventures of Tintin	Phil Barrenger, Keith F. Miller, Alessandro Saponi, Christoph Sprenger (For Pirate Battle)	Nominated
2012	Outstanding Virtual Cinematography in an Animated Feature Motion Picture	The Adventures of Tintin	Matt Aitken, Matthias Menz, Keith F. Miller, Wayne Stables	Nominated
2021	Outstanding Animated Character in an Animated Feature	The SpongeBob Movie: Sponge on the Run	Jacques Daigle, Guillaume Dufief, Adrien Montero, Liam Hill	Nominated
2024	Outstanding Visual Effects in an Animated Feature	Teenage Mutant Ninja Turtles: Mutant Mayhem	Matthieu Rouxel, Marie Balland, Jacques Daigle, Vincent Leroy	Nominated
2024	Outstanding Animated Character in an Animated Feature	Teenage Mutant Ninja Turtles: Mutant Mayhem	Gregory Coelho, Anne-Claire Leroux, Simon Cuisinier, Olivier Pierre (for Superfly)	Nominated
2024	Outstanding Created Environment in an Animated Feature	Teenage Mutant Ninja Turtles: Mutant Mayhem	Olivier Mitonneau, Eddy Frechou, Guillaume Chevet, Arnaud Philippe-Giraux (for Midtown Manhattan)	Nominated
2024	Outstanding Effects Simulations in an Animated Feature	Teenage Mutant Ninja Turtles: Mutant Mayhem	Louis Marsaud, Paul-Etienne Bourde, Serge Martin, Marine Pommereul	Nominated

=== Washington D.C. Area Film Critics Association ===
Year	Category	Film	Recipient(s)	Result
2011	Best Animated Feature	Rango	—N/a	Won
2011	Best Animated Feature	The Adventures of Tintin	—N/a	Nominated
2023	Best Animated Feature	Teenage Mutant Ninja Turtles: Mutant Mayhem	—N/a	Nominated

=== Women Film Critics Circle ===
Year	Category	Film	Recipient(s)	Result
2011	Best Family Film	The Adventures of Tintin	—N/a	Nominated

=== World Soundtrack Awards ===
Year	Category	Film	Recipient(s)	Result
2012	Best Original Soundtrack of the Year	The Adventures of Tintin	John Williams	Nominated
2012	Soundtrack Composer of the Year	The Adventures of Tintin	John Williams	Nominated

=== Young Artist Awards ===
Year	Category	Film	Recipient(s)	Result
1997	Best Performance in a Feature Film – Leading Young Actress	Harriet the Spy	Michelle Trachtenberg	Won
1997	Best Performance in a Feature Film – Supporting Actress	Harriet the Spy	Vanessa Lee Chester	Won
1997	Best Family Feature - Drama	Harriet the Spy	—N/a	Nominated
1997	Best Performance in a Feature Film – Supporting Young Actor	Harriet the Spy	Gregory Smith	Nominated
2001	Best Family Feature Film – Comedy	Snow Day	—N/a	Nominated
2001	Best Performance in a Feature Film – Young Actor Age Ten or Under	Snow Day	Connor Matheus	Nominated
2005	Best Family Feature Film – Animation	The SpongeBob SquarePants Movie	—N/a	Nominated
2007	Best Performance in a Voice-Over Role - Young Actor	Charlotte's Web	Dominic Scott Kay	Won
2007	Best Performance in a Feature Film - Young Lead Actress	Charlotte's Web	Dakota Fanning	Nominated
2007	Best Family Feature Film - Comedy or Musical	Charlotte's Web	—N/a	Nominated
2010	Best Performance in a Feature Film - Leading Young Actor	Hotel for Dogs	Jake T. Austin	Nominated
2010	Best Performance in a Feature Film - Leading Young Actress	Hotel for Dogs	Emma Roberts	Nominated
2010	Best Performance in a Feature Film - Leading Young Actress	Imagine That	Yara Shahidi	Nominated
2011	Best Performance in a Feature Film (Leading Young Actor)	The Last Airbender	Noah Ringer	Nominated
2011	Best Performance in a Feature Film (Leading Young Actress)	The Last Airbender	Seychelle Gabriel	Nominated
