= PS 144 =

Coordinates: 40°42′54.37″N 73°51′10.36″W

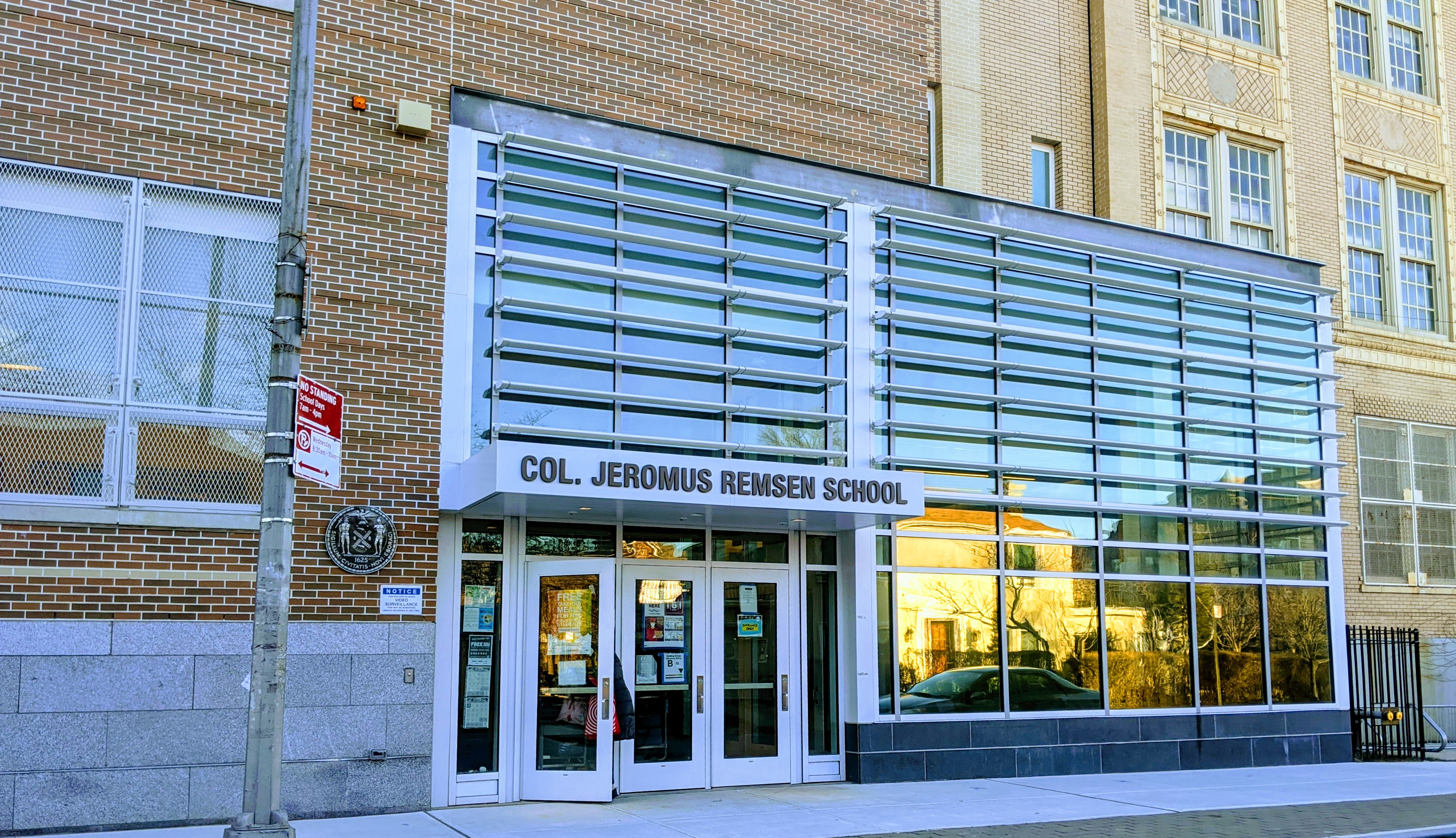

Information
- Motto: Work Hard, Dream Big, Never Give Up
- Established: 1931; 95 years ago
- Grades: Pre-Kindergarten - Grade 5
- Website: www.ps144q.org

PS 144 Col. Jeromus Remsen School is a local elementary school in Forest Hills, Queens, New York City. The zoned middle school for PS 144 is J.H.S. 190 Russell Sage.

== History ==
PS 144 originally opened in 1931. Due to overcrowding, a project to expand PS 144 commenced in 2017. The four-story PS 144 annex, which was completed in December 2019, contains 26 classrooms, a playground, a cafeteria and dining room, as well as additional office facilities. The existing building was also renovated to be ADA-accessible.

== Grades ==
The school encompasses grades pre-kindergarten to fifth grade. It has two full-day pre-kindergarten classes as of now. There are 4-7 classes in every other grade. Each grade has technology, science, physical education (referred to as gym in most of the classrooms if not all), art, math, and literacy. Some of the fifth grade takes ballroom dancing classes.

The school originally had a sixth-grade class. The last sixth-grade graduating class was in 2012.

== Arts ==
Ballroom Dancing is one of the most popular of the arts among the students in PS 144. Annually, a team is sent to compete in a citywide ballroom dancing competition. The school was featured in Mad Hot Ballroom, a documentary on ballroom dancing among children. Additionally starting in 2023, PS 144 has a basketball team that went undefeated in the 2023-2024 season.

The school has artists who come in and produce pieces of art. One example of this is the Tiffany designs students made, which are displayed at the Queens Museum of Art.

== Rankings ==
As of 2014, the statewide rank of PS 144 was #116 among 2,295 elementary schools (94.9% NY State percentile) in the New York Elementary School Rankings of School Digger. The same year, it also received a 10 out of 10 GreatSchools rating.

== Parents Association ==
There is a Parents Association at PS 144. The website for the Parents Association is www.pa144.com. The Parents' Association is very active and raises money to pay for extra art, music, or theater programs in every grade.

== See also ==
- List of public elementary schools in New York City

== Website ==
https://www.ps144q.org/
