= Nickelodeon Productions =

American television production company

- Logo used since March 4, 2023 (Note: The logo's wordmark has been in use since September 28, 2009. The variant displayed is meant for white backgrounds; the main variant has a white wordmark in conjunction with a fully orange splat.)
- Formerly: Games Productions (1987–1998); Nickelodeon Studios (2022–2025)
- Type: In-name-only unit of Paramount Television Studios
- Industry: Television production
- Genre: Children's television
- Founded: 1987; 39 years ago
- Fate: Operations folded into Paramount Television Studios, unit currently exists as an in-name-only unit of Paramount Television Studios
- Headquarters: One Astor Plaza, New York City, U.S.
- Area served: International
- Products: Television series Television films
- Owner: Skydance
- Parent: Nickelodeon (2002–2022); Paramount Pictures (2022–2025); Paramount Television Studios (2025–present)

Nickelodeon Productions (formerly Games Productions and Nickelodeon Studios) is the in-house American television production arm of Nickelodeon, responsible for developing and producing original programming for the network. Established in 1987, it became a central force in children's entertainment throughout the 1990s and 2000s, producing live-action and animated series that defined Nickelodeon's brand identity.

Today, Nickelodeon Productions operates as an in-name-only unit of Paramount Television Studios.

== History ==
Nickelodeon Productions was founded as Games Productions in 1987 as Nickelodeon expanded beyond cable programming into original content, after MTV Networks was purchased by Viacom. By 1991, the company was experimenting with music video programming and contests to engage young audiences.

In 1992, Nickelodeon announced plans to extend its brand into print and toys, signaling the company’s ambition to become a multimedia powerhouse.

The early 1990s also saw the rise of groundbreaking animated series such as The Ren & Stimpy Show, which became a cultural phenomenon and demonstrated Nickelodeon’s willingness to push boundaries in children's programming. Following the formation of Games Animation, Games Productions itself began doing business as Nickelodeon Productions.

The company continued to expand through the late 1990s, producing hit series such as CatDog and investing heavily in animation and live-action programming.

=== Expansion ===
By the late 1990s, Games Productions had become a cornerstone of children's television, with its programming influencing both cable and broadcast competitors. In 1996, the network was described as the "pied piper of cable," drawing rivals' attention for its ability to captivate young audiences.

Nickelodeon continued to invest in original programming, with Variety noting in 1997 that its major investments in animation and live-action were paying off.

In 1998, the company faced challenges in maintaining its animation pipeline, with reports of production slowdowns. Despite this, Nickelodeon remained a dominant force, with the Los Angeles Times describing its headquarters as "the house that Gak built," a reference to its popular toy tie-ins. That same year, Nickelodeon Productions retired the Games Productions name, after the opening of the Nickelodeon Animation Studios in Burbank.

In 1999, Nickelodeon Productions expanded into music and studio ventures, including a Gotham-based tune studio. The company also faced scrutiny for its programming decisions, with The New York Times reporting on Nickelodeon "removing the gloves" in its approach to content.

== Corporate developments ==
By the mid-1990s, Viacom was involved in a giant merger that reshaped the entertainment industry, further solidifying Games Productions' place within a growing media empire.

By 1995, Nickelodeon was expanding its reach into new ventures, including theme parks, as reported by the Los Angeles Times. Later that year, Viacom made significant financial moves to strengthen its cable holdings.

In 1998 and 1999, Nickelodeon Productions continued to expand its programming slate while facing industry challenges. Variety noted that Nickelodeon was "out of toon" due to animation bottlenecks, while the Los Angeles Times reported on the company's broader financial strategies.

The studio was reduced to an in-name only unit of Paramount Television Studios in October 2025. Even upon this, most current productions, including animated television shows, remain marketed on-screen under the studio's name.

== See also ==
- Nickelodeon Animation Studio
- Nickelodeon Movies
  - List of Nickelodeon Movies productions
