= Amy Sewell =

American author and filmmaker (born 1963)

- Born: 1963 (age 62–63); Cedar Rapids, Iowa, U.S.
- Education: University of Michigan
- Occupations: filmmaker, director, writer, producer

Amy Sewell (born 1963) is an American author and filmmaker, best known for Mad Hot Ballroom (Paramount, 2005), in which she debuted as a film writer and producer.

Sewell is also the founder/director of a non-profit organization, Give It Up for the ARTS. The non-profit's main mission is to help kids gain exposure to the arts.

== Early career ==
Sewell was born in Cedar Rapids, Iowa in 1963, and grew up in suburban Chicago and Detroit. In 1985, she earned a degree in marketing and communications from the University of Michigan.

After working in marketing for several years, Sewell enrolled in Schiller International University, located in Paris, France, where she studied business administration, receiving a Masters of Business Administration (MBA). Sewell moved to New York in 1989.

In NYC, Sewell spent 15 years as a marketing executive in the publishing industry before leaving to spend more time at home with her twin daughters. Sewell later began working as a writer, reporting local stories for her neighborhood newspaper, the Tribeca Trib, in lower Manhattan. In July 2003, following the publication of a feature story in the Tribeca Trib about New York City public school children studying ballroom dance, Sewell worked with film producer Marilyn Agrelo to turn her story into a documentary Mad Hot Ballroom.

== Films ==
Mad Hot Ballroom was Sewell's debut film, was based on a feature article written by Sewell. Mad Hot Ballroom looks at the lives of eleven-year-old New York City public school kids, as they prepare for a citywide ballroom dancing competition. The film is told from the students' perspectives.

Mad Hot Ballroom received several awards:

- The Christopher Award in 2006
- Best Documentary at the Karlovy Vary International Film Festival in 2005
- The Audience Award at the Philadelphia Film Festival
- Satellite Award for Best Documentary Feature in 2005

What's your point, honey? was the second documentary made by Sewell, with filmmaker Susan Toffler. The film covers seven women who were selected by CosmoGirl magazine as possible presidential contenders for the 2024 US Presidential Election.

== Published work ==
Sewell’s books include:

- The Mad Hot Adventures of a Documentary Filmmaker (Hyperion 2007)
- She's Out There! The Next Generation of Presidential Candidates (2008)

Sewell’s short stories and screenplays include:

- Coming Up Seven (1993)
- Double Knots (1993)
- Collection of Short Stories: 1976–present
- The Coffee Club (Screenplay; WGA#068612-00; 1992)

Sewell has also written the following news articles:

- Their Personal Best (The Tribeca Trib, April 2007)
- Reading, Writing and Rumba (The Tribeca Trib, July 2003)
- Kindergarten Parent Volunteer Olympics (The Tribeca Trib, June 2003)
- In These Times, Mom's Role Is Warrior, Too (The Tribeca Trib, April 2003)
- Big Ideas (The Tribeca Trib, March 2003)
- SPLASH! (The Tribeca Trib, February 2003)

== Television series proposals and scripts ==
- Mommy Juice (Copyright 2002)

== Filmography ==
- Mad Hot Ballroom (2005)
- what's your point, honey? (2008)
