= The Nobodies (novel) =

2005 novel by N. E. Bode

- First edition dust jacket art
- Author: N. E. Bode
- Cover artist: Peter Ferguson
- Language: English
- Series: The Anybodies Series
- Genre: Children's Fantasy novel
- Publisher: HarperCollins Children's Books
- Publication date: June 2005
- Publication place: United States
- Media type: Print (Hardback)
- Pages: 292 pp (first edition, hardback)
- ISBN: 978-0-06-055738-6 (first edition, hardback)
- OCLC: 56590973
- LC Class: PZ7.B63362 Nob 2005
- Preceded by: The Anybodies
- Followed by: The Somebodies

The Nobodies is a fantasy novel by N. E. Bode. It follows The Anybodies and has one sequel, The Somebodies.

== Plot summary ==
Fern Drudger is a child who has the ability to shake things out of books. But, lately, only Diet Lime Fizzy Drinks seem to pop out of them. The Fizzy Drinks always have messages from a mysterious group called the Nobodies. As it turns out to be, Nobodies are people or animals that are shaken out of books and haven't been returned yet to their homes inside the books. The Nobodies seem to have a terrible enemy, and they say that Fern is the only one who can save them.

Fern, now reunited with her real parents, is sent off to Camp Happy Sunshine Good Times, a camp for young Anybodies. Anybodies are people who can transform themselves or others into different objects through hypnotism. At the camp, Fern meets Mary Stern, the counselor for girls. However, it turns out that the counselors and director of the camp seem to have deadly secrets. Camp Happy Sunshine Good Times has strict rules, and Fern easily breaks one of them. When she receives her punishment, Fern discovers that she is destined to help the Nobodies, who are trapped by the evil Mole, or BORT. BORT is a giant mole who had trapped a family of Nobodies in a Diet Lime Fizzy Drinks factory in a basement at the Avenue of Americas. The Mole can only be shrunk down to the size of normal mole when it touches water. Fern must somehow get BORT to touch water and bring peace to the second earth.
