= The Anybodies =

2004 novel by Julianna Baggott

- Author: Julianna Baggott
- Illustrator: Peter Ferguson
- Language: English
- Series: The Anybodies Series
- Genre: Children's fantasy novel
- Publisher: HarperCollins
- Publication date: June 2004
- Publication place: United States
- Media type: Print (hardback & paperback)
- Pages: 288 pp (first edition, hardback)
- ISBN: 978-0-06-055735-5 (first edition, hardback)
- OCLC: 53145448
- LC Class: PZ7.B14027 An 2004
- Followed by: The Nobodies

The Anybodies is a fantasy novel by Julianna Baggott under the pen name N.E. Bode. Two sequels were released, called The Nobodies and The Somebodies. It was a nominee for the 2006 Nene Award.

== Plot summary ==
Fern has lived all her life with the Drudgers, extremely dull adults who worked at a firm, Beige & Beige. One day, the Beige family, the owners of the firm, visit the Drudger's house. Mrs. Drudger hopes that the Beiges' son, Milton, will one day marry Fern. Three other visitors arrive shortly after. They are the Bone family, Howard, and Mary Curtain, the nurse who delivered the Drudger's baby. Mary confesses that she had accidentally swapped their kids. Fern belonged to the Bone family, and Howard actually belonged to the Drudgers. After the Beiges leave, the Bone and the Drudgers discuss and conclude that they will try unswapping for just the summer and see how it goes.

While the Bone drives Fern and Mary Curtain back to his house, Mary Curtain is not really Mary Curtain. She is a man named Marty. He and the Bone tell Fern that they are Anybodies, who can be anybody or anything. The Bone and Marty were once great Anybodies, but they are slowly losing the powers. The only thing that can improve their skills is Fern's dead mother Eliza's book, The Art of Being Anybody. But no one knows where the book is, for Eliza (a great Anybody) died before she could tell anyone about it. Now, Fern and the Anybodies are in search of the book.

Fern suspects that the book may be hidden in Eliza's mother's house. They head off, the Bone disguised as Mr. Bibb, a lisping encyclopedia seller, and Fern as Ida Bibb, his daughter. At the boarding house, Fern discovers that the Bone's enemy, the Miser, is looking for The Art of Being Anybody as well. Fern and the Bone must find the book before the Miser, who may be plotting something terrible with his Anybody skills.

At Mrs. Appleplum's (a name Fern came up with when asked to do so by Mrs. Appleplum) home, Fern finds out that she has magical powers to shake things out of books. Fern's Grandmother(Mrs. Appleplum) is the Great Realdo, a fantastic Anybody. The book has many elements similar to Cornelia Funke's Inkheart.

== Characters ==
- Fern Drudger: A smart girl who was swapped accidentally at birth. When Mr. Drudger went to the hospital and sat in the waiting room a plastic fern rubbed against him, so he named his "daughter" Fern. Throughout her childhood, Fern had a series of strange things happen to her. As a toddler she had a picture book which, when opened, the crickets from the illustrations came hopping out. In winter she caught snow in her mittens and took it inside, where it turned to a piece of paper that read: Things aren't always what they seem, are they?
- Mr. and Mrs. Drudger: Fern's dull parents that collect toasters, sponges, and refrigerator magnets. They are accountants for the firm Beige & Beige.
- The Bone: Fern's father. His mother, a trapeze artist, named him because she thought he must have an extra sweet bone. He grew up in a circus with his best friend, the Miser. They both met Eliza, Fern's mother, at the same time, and fell in love with her. The Miser grew to hate the Bone because he eventually won Eliza's heart. Eliza trained the Bone to be an Anybody.
- The Miser: A sinister man, formerly the Bone's friend, who loved Eliza, Fern's mother. He used to write her love notes that would make her cry.

== Awards and nominations ==
- The Anybodies was a 2006 nominee for the Nene Award.

== Possible film adaption ==
On December 8, 2004, it has reported that Paramount Pictures and Nickelodeon Movies have acquired the film rights from the book series. It was set to be released in 2006, but has not been released since then. It is unknown if the film will be released.
