= Mad Hot Ballroom =

2005 documentary film

- Theatrical release poster
- Directed by: Marilyn Agrelo
- Written by: Amy Sewell
- Produced by: Marilyn Agrelo; Amy Sewell; Brian David Cange; Wilder Knight II
- Starring: Madeleine Hackney
- Cinematography: Claudia Raschke-Robinson
- Edited by: Sabine Krayenbuhl
- Music by: Joseph Baker; Steven Lutvak
- Production company: Just One Productions
- Distributed by: Paramount Classics (under Nickelodeon Movies)
- Release date: May 13, 2005
- Running time: 106 minutes
- Country: United States
- Language: English
- Budget: $500,000
- Box office: $9.4 million

Mad Hot Ballroom is a 2005 American documentary film directed and co-produced by Marilyn Agrelo and written and co-produced by Amy Sewell, about a ballroom dance program in the New York City Department of Education, the New York City public school system for fifth graders. Several styles of dance are shown in the film, such as tango, foxtrot, swing, rumba, and merengue.

== Synopsis ==
Based on a feature article written by Sewell, Mad Hot Ballroom looks inside the lives of 11-year-old New York City public school kids who journey into the world of ballroom dancing and reveal pieces of themselves along the way. Told from the students' perspectives as the children strive toward the final citywide competition, the film chronicles the experiences of students at three schools in the neighborhoods of Tribeca, Bensonhurst and Washington Heights. The students are united by an interest in the ballroom dancing lessons, which builds over a 10-week period and culminates in a competition to find the school that has produced the best dancers in the city. As the teachers cajole their students to learn the intricacies of the various disciplines, Agrelo intersperses classroom footage with the students' musings on life; many of these reveal an underlying maturity.

== Release ==
The documentary premiered at the 2005 Sundance Film Festival in Park City, Utah, where Paramount Classics and Nickelodeon Movies acquired distribution rights outside Australia and New Zealand for $2 million. It had a limited theatrical release in the United States on May 13, 2005. Mad Hot Ballroom was the second highest grossing documentary in 2005 after March of the Penguins. As of February 7, 2012, it had earned over $8.1 million, making it the sixteenth-highest-grossing documentary film in the United States (in nominal dollars, from 1982 to the present).

== Reception ==
=== Critical reception ===
On the review aggregator website Rotten Tomatoes, 84% of 120 critics' reviews are positive, with an average rating of 7.2/10. The website's consensus reads: "This heartwarming documentary will win audiences over, as the sheer charm of precocious, enthusiastic children learning to dance resonates from the screen." Metacritic, which uses a weighted average, assigned the film a score of 71 out of 100, based on 32 critics, indicating "generally favorable" reviews.

=== Awards ===
Awards bestowed upon Mad Hot Ballroom include:

- The Christopher Award in 2006
- Best Documentary at the Karlovy Vary International Film Festival in 2005
- The Audience Award at the Philadelphia Film Festival
- Satellite Award for Best Documentary Feature in 2005

== See also ==
- Pierre Dulaine
