= Marilyn Agrelo =

American film director and producer

- Citizenship: American
- Occupations: Film director; Film producer

Marilyn Agrelo is an American film director and producer.

She directed and co-produced the 2005 documentary film Mad Hot Ballroom. The documentary won several awards, including the Satellite Award for Best Documentary Film in 2005 and the Christopher Award in 2006.

Her documentary Street Gang: How We Got to Sesame Street premiered at the 2021 Sundance Film Festival.

== Selected filmography ==
- 2005: Mad Hot Ballroom
- 2010: An Invisible Sign
- 2021: Street Gang: How We Got to Sesame Street
