= Padre Canyon =

Canyon in Utah, United States

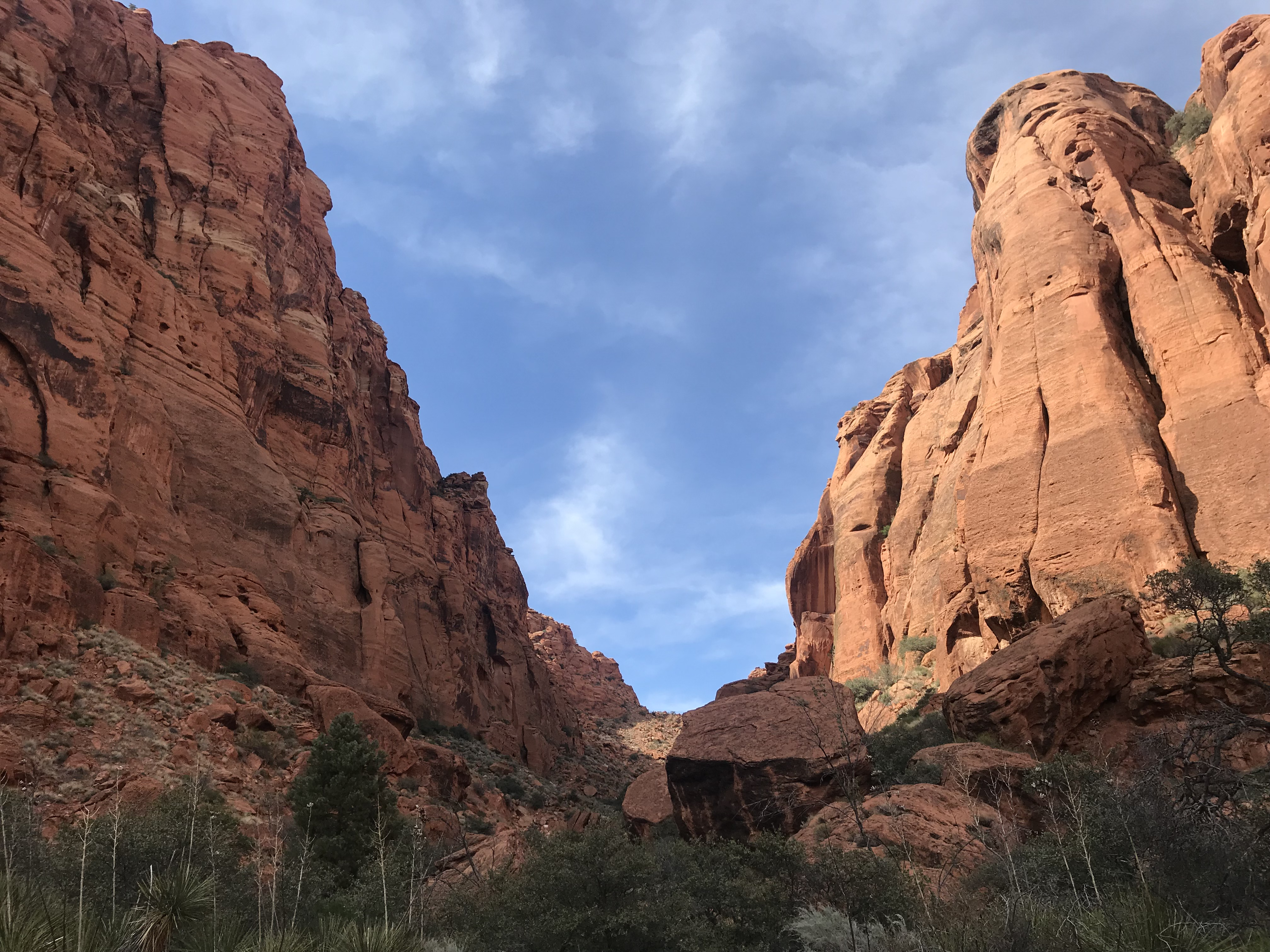
- View of the saddle in Padre Canyon from the main hiking trail

- Location within Utah

Geography
- Country: United States
- State: Utah
- County: Washington
- Population center: Ivins
- Coordinates: 37°11′02.8″N 113°39′20″W
- Interactive map of Padre Canyon

Padre Canyon is adjacent to Snow Canyon State Park and Red Mountain in Ivins, Utah, United States, and features a three-sided canyon and scenic sentinels carved from the red Navajo Sandstone. Padre Canyon is part of the Red Cliffs Desert Reserve, a 62,000 acre protected area that contains three distinct ecosystems: the Mojave Desert, the Colorado Plateau and the Great Basin. Geological features of the canyon include Padre Rock, the Padre Arch, pillared rock formations and sand dunes.

== About ==
Padre Canyon is in southwest Utah, roughly 50 miles west of Zion National Park with a valley elevation of 3,100 feet above sea level. Padre Canyon is a three sided canyon oriented north to south.

To the east is steep sloping hillside that gradually merges upward into vertical Kayenta and Navajo Sandstone cliffs at 4,000 feet elevation. The east side of the canyon descends southward to 3,500 feet and abruptly terminates in the North Black Rocks lava field.

The north end of the canyon is a saddle with a trail peak elevation of 3,740 feet in altitude. The west side of the canyon is Red Mountain at 4,500 feet in altitude.

To the south of the canyon is the low lying basin of the Mohave Desert with vistas of the Utah Range, the first in a long series of ranges of the Basin and Range Physiographic province.

The area is bordered and protected by Snow Canyon State Park, the Red Cliffs National Conservation Area (managed by the Bureau of Land Management), and the Red Cliffs Desert Reserve. The canyon is adjacent to the Red Mountain Wilderness. The Tuacahn Center for the Arts is located in the mouth of the canyon.

== Facilities ==
Padre Canyon is accessible by car from Tuacahn Drive, with parking available at a pull-over just south of the main gate for the Tuacahn Center for the Arts. The Padre Canyon hiking trail can be accessed using a small trail east of the canyon wash, or from a small connector at the northeast portion of the Tuacahn facility. No bathrooms, picnic areas or campgrounds are available. There is no trailer parking.

== Climate ==
Padre Canyon, like much of the Red Cliffs Desert Reserve, has a dry and arid climate. In summer it is generally hot during the day and warm at night, with an average daily high of 101 °F (38 °C) and low of 74 °F (23 °C) recorded for the nearby town of Ivins in the month July. In fall and winter months it is generally temperate during the day and cold at night, with an average daily high of 52 °F (11 °C) and low of 32 °F (0 °C) in Ivins in December. The area sees regular light precipitation of around 0.7 inches (1.8 cm) each month with the exception of May and June when precipitation reduces to around 0.2 inches (0.51 cm).

== History ==
The area around Padre and Snow Canyons has had human activity since the 5th century BC. From AD 200 to 1250, Ancestral Puebloans inhabited the nearby region, utilizing the canyon for hunting and gathering. Southern Paiute used the canyon from AD 1200 to the mid-19th century.

Orval Hafen purchased 80 acres in Padre Canyon in 1957, and built a cabin at the base of the cliffs. He described the canyon, saying

There before me lay a scene of indescribable beauty: wild, primitive, unspoiled, largely unknown, waiting to be enjoyed, waiting to inspire folks

— https://www.erbzine.com/mag33/3341a.html

In 1993, local playwright Douglass Stewart raised funds to convert the natural amphitheater at the base of the cliffs to what would eventually become Tuacahn Amphitheatre and Center for the Arts.

== Flora and fauna ==
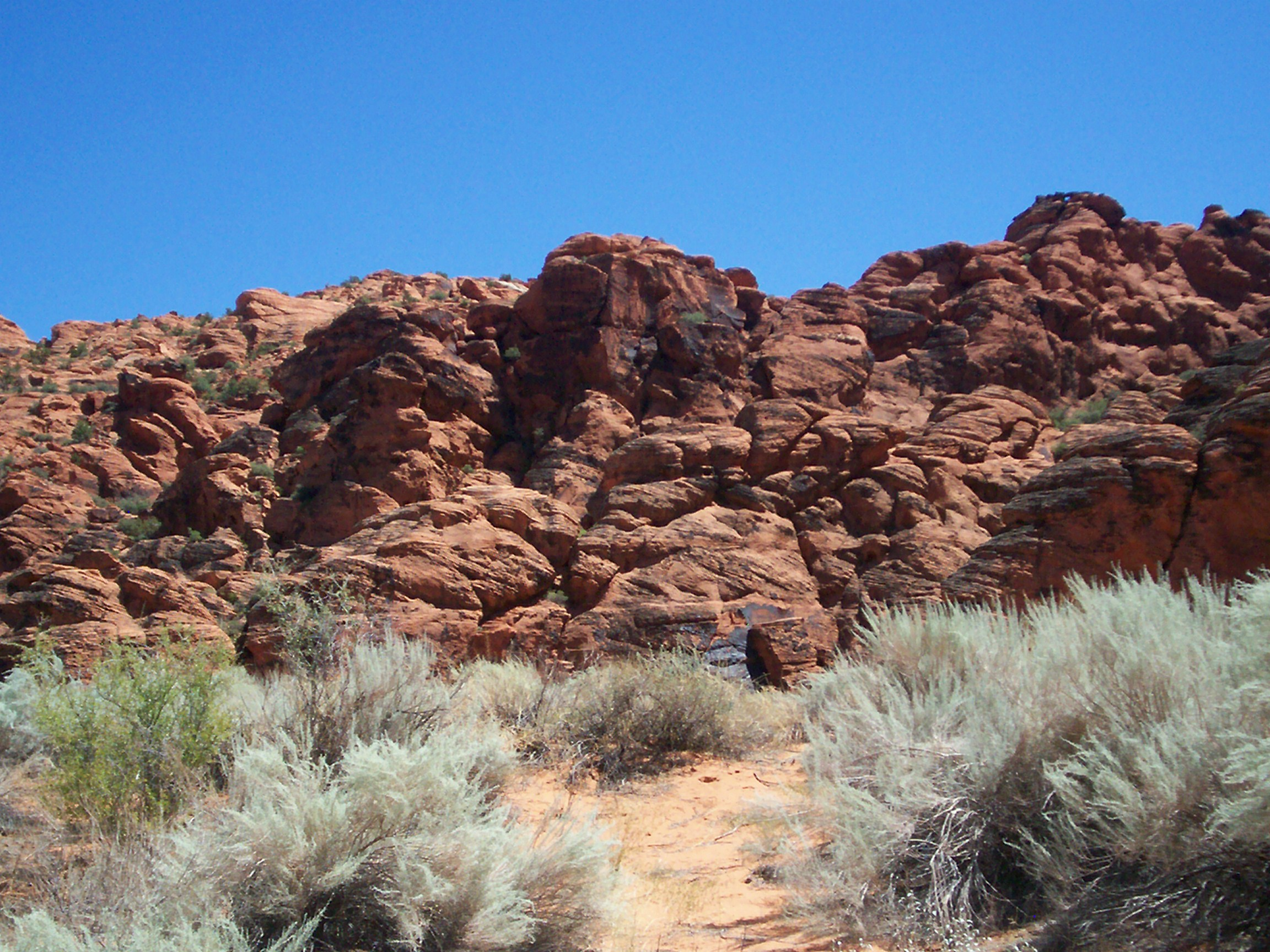
Various types of desert shrubs are found in the park against the rock formations

Padre Canyon has views of Snow Canyon State Park backcountry. During the springtime this area shows desert wildflowers of desert baileya, banana and soap tree yucca, brittle brush, creosote bush, indigo bush, purple sage, range ratany, palmers penstemon, hedgehog and prickly pear. Wash areas host tamarisk.

Wildlife includes the Gila monster, peregrine falcon and desert tortoise. In 1990, the U.S. Fish and Wildlife Service listed the Mojave Desert tortoise as a "threatened" species. Small fences to keep the ground dwelling creatures from accidentally wandering onto roads border the roadway into the canyon. Other notable wildlife include the giant desert hairy scorpion, coyote, Mojave sidewinder, red-spotted toad, Utah banded gecko, and the side-blotched lizard, among many others.

== Geology ==
Padre Canyon is within Washington County, which lies on the Hurricane Fault. The fault bisects the county, and is visible at the Hurricane Cliffs, which run south to the Grand Canyon. The fault has exposed colorful layers of rocks dating back to the age of the dinosaurs and older. Most of the scenic red rock is known as Navajo Sandstone. Navajo sandstone was created from layers of cemented sand that blew into Utah nearly 200 million years ago. In the past million years, eruptions of several cinder cones and lava flows scattered the ground with black basaltic rocks.

== Trails ==
Padre Canyon Trail – 4.7 miles (7.6 km). Medium to hard, maneuvering through slots, off ledges, and through holes on your knees, and may involve some wading, especially in the winter and spring. Highlights include slickrock hiking, arched alcoves, the Doll House and an undisturbed ecosystem. It is not recommended for those without some backcountry experience.

Red Mountain Route - 10.8 miles (17.4 km). Strenuous. Primitive route is remote and faint in places, great panoramic views, extreme caution is recommended.

Toe Trail – 2.8 miles (4.5 km). Easy trail. Follows Ivins flood control dike.
