= Tuacahn =

Art organization in Ivins, Utah

Tuacahn Center for the Arts
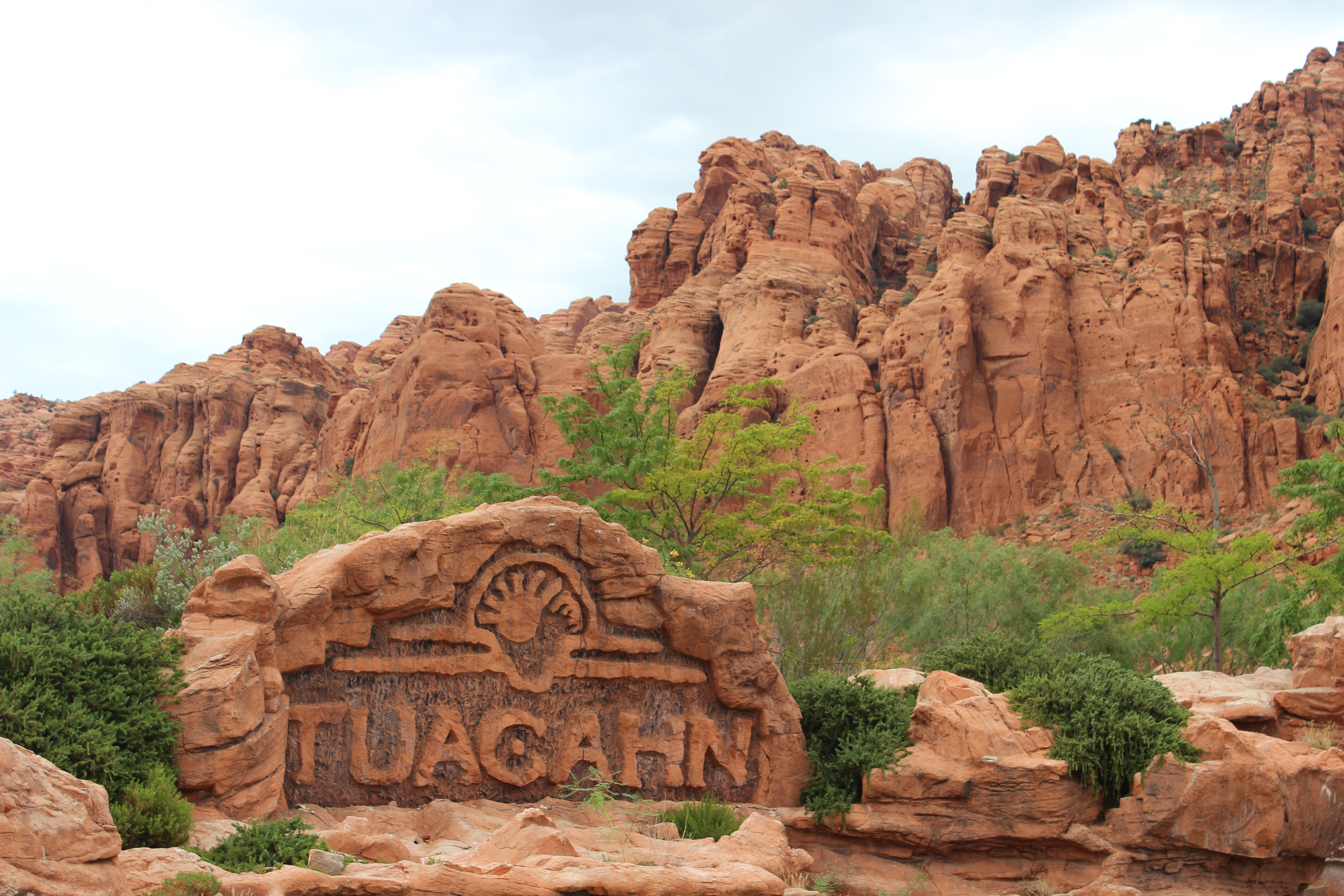
- Interactive map of Tuacahn Center for the Arts
- Address: 1100 Tuacahn Drive; Ivins, Utah; United States
- Coordinates: 37.1913°N 113.6592°W
- Owner: Tuacahn Center for the Arts
- Capacity: 1,920
- Type: Outdoor Amphitheatre
- Production: Disney's Beauty and the Beast; School of Rock; The Count of Monte Cristo

Construction
- Opened: April 1995
- Architect: Mesa Consulting Group Inc.

Website
- www.tuacahn.org

The Tuacahn Center for the Arts is an arts organization located at the mouth of the Padre Canyon, adjacent to Snow Canyon State Park, in Ivins, Utah. The 42,000-square-foot (3,900 m^{2}) facility was completed in 1995 and includes a 1,920-seat outdoor amphitheater, a 328 seat indoor theater, a black box theater, a dance studio, a costume shop, a scene shop, and the campus of Tuacahn High School for the Arts. The Tuacahn Center for the Arts contributes to the arts by producing two or three performances on its amphitheater stage and offers a spring and fall concert series for the region. They also produce the annual "Christmas in the Canyon" featuring a live-action recreation of the nativity called the "Festival of Lights."

== History ==
Tuacahn was founded in 1995 by playwright Douglas C. Stewart. Partnering with philanthropist and businessman, Hyrum W. Smith, he planned to create a space to tell the stories of Utah's ancient inhabitants and pioneer settlers. The two, using a plot of 80 acres (320,000 m^{2}) previously owned by Orval Hafen, set to build this dream. Seven Nielsen designed the amphitheater complex which included a 45,000-gallon water holding pond, a river spillway, and a drainage system for the flash-flood sequence in the inaugural run of the musical production of Utah!.

=== Construction ===
During the construction of the center, two Mojave desert tortoises (an endangered species) were found dead along the road which led from the main highway to the construction site. This halted construction while an investigation by the Fish and Wildlife Service commenced. On August 18, 1994, an agreement was reached between the Heritage Arts Foundation and the US Fish and Wildlife Service in which the foundation paid a fine of $20,000 and agreed to special measures to ensure tortoises would be protected during construction and after the center opened. This included special "tortoise-proof fences" and passages underneath the road where wildlife could pass under.

=== Opening and "Utah!: the Musical Spectacular" ===
Tuacahn opened in April 1995 with a dedication by Gordon B. Hinckley and the Mormon Tabernacle Choir.

The venue initially presented the musical Utah! (book by Robert Paxton, lyrics by Doug Stewart, music by Kurt Bestor and Sam Cardon, and production design by Seven Nielsen) a dramatic retelling of the founding of southern Utah through the eyes of Jacob Hamblin, an early pioneer called by Brigham Young to settle the city of Santa Clara and to make peace with the Native Americans in the region. The production used the natural canyon setting to great effect, dramatically lighting the red rock cliffs and incorporating special elements like pyrotechnics, live animals, and special effects including a flash flood that came across the stage toward the audience. Amidst the spectacle, the production's book included subjects sensitive to the Mormon population, including depictions of polygamy, the Mountain Meadows Massacre, and Jesus Christ's appearance to Native Americans, as recorded in the Book of Mormon. Audience discomfort with these issues and lukewarm reviews prompted the rewriting of the show every season. Minor changes were made between the premiere in 1995 and the 1996 production. A major rewrite was undertaken for the 1997 production by Reed McColm, but major characters remained and Jacob Hamblin was still central to the story. In 1998, the book and lyrics were completely rewritten by Tim Slover and Marvin Payne, creating a fictional storyline that emphasized the peacemaking efforts between pioneers and native peoples. The production was remounted one final time for an abbreviated fall season in 2002, with Stallion Cornell providing yet another new book based on the 1996 version of the show. "Utah!" has not been produced since the 2002 season.

=== "Broadway in the Desert" ===
In 1999, with diminishing interest in "Utah!" and lackluster ticket sales from the 1998 season, the Tuacahn's board of directors changed the theater's programming to a season of more popular, family-friendly Broadway musicals presented in rotating repertory. The first season of this new format consisted of a double bill of Joseph and the Technicolor Dreamcoat and Seven Brides for Seven Brothers, both of which were wildly successful with visitors from all United States and 25 other nations. In 2002, productions of Annie Get Your Gun and Joseph and the Technicolor Dream Coat broke all previous box office records. This occurred again in 2003 when The Wizard of Oz broke all box office records at Tuacahn.

In 2005, under the direction of the new artistic director Scott Anderson, Tuacahn commemorated their tenth season by presenting Beauty and the Beast and a third production of Joseph and the Amazing Technicolor Dream Coat. These two shows once again beat all previous ticket sales. The successful production of "Disney's Beauty and the Beast" began a relationship between Tuacahn and Disney Theatricals that has lasted over a decade. In 2006, MTI selected Tuacahn as one of eight regional theaters in the United States to present the first post-Broadway semi-professional productions of Les Misérables. In June 2009, Tuacahn was awarded rights to present the post-Broadway regional-theater premiere of Disney's Tarzan. Due to this success, Disney awarded them the rights for the post-Broadway regional premiere of The Little Mermaid. The 2014 season, which included The Little Mermaid, The Wizard of Oz, and Joseph and the Amazing Technicolor Dream Coat, was its most successful season to date hosting over 260,000 patrons. Tuacahn announced its 2015 season would include "Disney's Beauty And The Beast", "Disney's When You Wish", and "Sister Act". "Disney's When You Wish" was a world premier.

== Educational Programs ==
Tuacahn's school facility was originally conceived as a private school where students would receive private lessons and participate in group classes. The school was not initially successful, due in part to the remoteness of the location of the school.

In 1999, Tuacahn decided to re-open the school as a Utah Charter High School. Tuacahn High School for the Performing Arts, a high school that combines a college preparatory curriculum and an arts focus in music, dance, theater, or visual art. Over the years it has been awarded with many accolades including first place at the Utah Shakespeare Festival. Over 30% of graduates from Tuacahn High continue to complete 4 year college degrees.

== Venues ==
Tuacahn has two venues most frequently used for theatrical productions.

=== Tuacahn Amphitheater ===
The Tuacahn Amphitheater is a 2500-seat open-air amphitheater. It consists of three sections of seating (Left, Right, Center) with 32 rows A (front) - FF (rear). All seats have backs and arms, but are not cushioned. Entrance to the amphitheater is from the rear, requiring all patrons to descend the stairs toward their seats. Patrons with limited mobility are encouraged to sit near the top (rear) of the amphitheater. There is extra leg room on row O which is sometimes used during the productions when actors walk through the audience. Wheelchair accessible seating is available on the back row (FF) only. The stage has a concrete subfloor with a concrete pass-under tunnel to get from stage left to stage right out of view of the audience. The rear of the stage is open to expose the desertscape and red rock cliffs behind the stage which contains lighting, sound, pyrotechnical, and water effects installations. The area behind the stage is a mixture of natural stone and naturally colored concrete. This concrete riverbed was installed during initial construction to facilitate a massive 55,000 gallon flood of water that comes from the back of the canyon and across the stage toward the audience. Though conceptualized and custom-built for the "Utah!" production, this special effect and other water effects have been featured in numerous productions at Tuacahn.

=== The Hafen Theater ===
The Hafen Theater is a 328-seat indoor proscenium arch theatrical facility. It is part of the Tuacahn High School for the Performing Arts facility, though semi-professionally staged productions have been featured in this theater in the past.

=== Black Box and Dance Studio ===
The black box theater and dance studio are used primarily as working spaces for school classes, rehearsals, and special events. They are not commonly used for theatrical presentations.

== Productions in the Amphitheater ==
1995

- Utah!

1996

- Utah!
- Quilters
- 1940's Radio Hour

1997

- Utah!

1998

- Utah!
- How the West Was Won

1999

- Seven Brides for Seven Brothers
- Joseph and the Amazing Technicolor Dreamcoat

2000

- The Music Man
- Fiddler on the Roof

2001

- Oklahoma!
- The Sound of Music

2002

- Utah!
- Annie Get Your Gun
- Joseph and the Amazing Technicolor Dreamcoat
- Once on This Island (Tuacahn High School)

2003

- The Wizard of Oz
- The King and I
- The Unsinkable Molly Brown
- Bye Bye Birdie (Tuacahn High School)

2004

- Guys and Dolls
- West Side Story
- Singin' in the Rain
- Crazy for You (Tuacahn High School)

2005

- Beauty and the Beast
- Joseph and the Amazing Technicolor Dreamcoat
- Les Misérables: School Version (Tuacahn High School)

2006

- Peter Pan
- South Pacific
- Cats

2007

- Cinderella
- My Fair Lady
- 42nd Street

2008

- Les Misérables
- The Sound of Music
- Big River

2009

- Annie
- Footloose
- Aida

2010

- Tarzan
- Cats
- Crazy for You

2011

- The Little Mermaid
- Grease

2012

- Aladdin
- Hairspray
- Titanic (Tuacahn High School)

2013

- Mary Poppins
- Starlight Express
- Thoroughly Modern Millie
- West Side Story (Tuacahn High School)

2014

- The Little Mermaid
- The Wizard of Oz
- Joseph and the Amazing Technicolor Dreamcoat
- South Pacific (Tuacahn High School)

2015

- Beauty and the Beast
- Disney's When You Wish (musical)
- Sister Act
- Footloose (Tuacahn High School)

2016

- Grease (Tuacahn High School)
- Peter Pan
- Disney's Tarzan
- The Hunchback of Notre Dame

2017

- Little Shop of Horrors (Tuacahn High School)
- Shrek The Musical
- Mamma Mia!
- Newsies

2018

- Rodgers & Hammerstein’s Cinderella
- Matilda the Musical
- The Prince of Egypt

2019

- The Sound of Music
- The Little Mermaid
- Disney's When You Wish (musical)

2021

- Annie
- Beauty and the Beast
- School of Rock
- The Count of Monte Cristo

2022

- Mary Poppins
- Wonderland
- Joseph and The Amazing Technicolor Dreamcoat

2023

- Disney's Tarzan
- Ronald Dahl's Charlie and the Chocolate Factory
- The Hunchback of Notre Dame

2024

- Disney's Frozen
- Anastasia
- Jersey Boys

2025

- Disney's The Little Mermaid
- The Wizard of Oz
- Newsies

2026

- Disney & Pixar's Finding Nemo: A 70-Minute Family Musical
- Les Misérables
- Grease

2027

- Hairspray
- The Price of Egypt
- Disney's Hercules the Musical

== Productions in the Hafen Theatre ==
1995

- The Fantasticks
- Greater Tuna
- The Taffetas

1996

- Quilters
- The 1940's Radio Hour

2000

- See How They Run

2001

- Nunsense
- The Littlest Angel (Tuacahn High School)

2002

- The Diviners (Tuacahn High School)
- Anything Goes (Tuacahn High School)

2003

- I Never Saw Another Butterfly (Tuacahn High School)
- Schoolhouse Rock! (Tuacahn High School)

2004

- The Teahouse of the August Moon (Tuacahn High School)

2006

- Grease: School Version (Tuacahn High School)

2007

- Little Shop of Horrors

2008

- Disney's High School Musical

2009

- Disney's High School Musical 2

2012

- How to Succeed in Business Without Really Trying (Tuacahn High School)
- The 25th Annual Putnam County Spelling Bee

2013

- The Crucible (Tuacahn High School)
- Mulan

2014

- The Threepenny Opera (Tuacahn High School)
- The Tempest (Tuacahn High School)

2016

- These Shining Lives (Tuacahn High School)

2017

- Smokey Joe's Cafe (Tuacahn High School)
- Fairytale Christmas

2018

- Million Dollar Quartet
- Shakespeare In Love (Tuacahn High School)
- Fairytale Christmas

2019

- A Gentleman's Guide to Love and Murder
- Elf

== See also ==
- List of contemporary amphitheaters
