= 35th Daytime Emmy Awards =

- Date: June 20, 2008 (Ceremony); June 13, Frederick P. Rose Hall, NYC (Creative Arts Awards)
- Location: Kodak Theatre, Los Angeles, California
- Presented by: National Academy of Television Arts and Sciences
- Hosted by: Cameron Mathison; Sherri Shepherd

Highlights
- Outstanding Drama Series: General Hospital
- Outstanding Game Show: Cash Cab

Television/radio coverage
- Network: ABC

The 35th Annual Daytime Emmy Awards were held on Friday, June 20, 2008 at the Kodak Theatre in Los Angeles, and were televised in the United States on ABC. This was the last Daytime Emmys telecast to air on ABC. The Creative Arts Emmy Awards were presented seven days earlier on June 13 at the Frederick P. Rose Hall.

The ceremony was hosted by Sherri Shepherd and Cameron Mathison, and the nominations were announced on April 30, 2008 on The View.

For the first time, all voting and entries for the awards were made online via a dedicated web site.

== Nominations and winners ==
The following is a partial list of nominees, with winners in bold:

=== Outstanding Drama Series ===
- **General Hospital (ABC)**
- Guiding Light (CBS)
- One Life to Live (ABC)
- The Young and the Restless (CBS)

=== Outstanding Lead Actor in a Drama Series ===
- Peter Bergman (Jack Abbott, The Young and the Restless)
- David Canary (Adam Chandler & Stuart Chandler, All My Children)
- **Anthony Geary (Luke Spencer, General Hospital)**
- Christian LeBlanc (Michael Baldwin, The Young and the Restless)
- Thaao Penghlis (André DiMera & Tony DiMera, Days of Our Lives)

=== Outstanding Lead Actress in a Drama Series ===
- Crystal Chappell (Olivia Spencer, Guiding Light)
- **Jeanne Cooper (Katherine Chancellor, The Young and the Restless)**
- Nicole Forester (Cassie Lewis, Guiding Light)
- Michelle Stafford (Phyllis Newman, The Young and the Restless)
- Maura West (Carly Tenney, As the World Turns)

=== Outstanding Supporting Actor in a Drama Series ===
- Daniel Cosgrove (Bill Lewis, Guiding Light)
- Trent Dawson (Henry Coleman, As the World Turns)
- Brian Kerwin (Charlie Banks, One Life to Live)
- Greg Rikaart (Kevin Fisher, The Young and the Restless)
- **Kristoff St. John (Neil Winters, The Young and the Restless)**

=== Outstanding Supporting Actress in a Drama Series ===
- Tracey E. Bregman (Lauren Fenmore Baldwin, The Young and the Restless)
- Judi Evans (Adrienne Johnson, Days of Our Lives)
- Kelley Menighan Hensley (Emily Stewart, As the World Turns)
- **Gina Tognoni (Dinah Marler, Guiding Light)**
- Heather Tom (Katie Logan, The Bold and the Beautiful)

=== Outstanding Younger Actor in a Drama Series ===
- Darin Brooks (Max Brady, Days of Our Lives)
- Bryton (Devon Hamilton, The Young and the Restless)
- Van Hansis (Luke Snyder, As the World Turns)
- **Tom Pelphrey (Jonathan Randall, Guiding Light)**
- Jesse Soffer (Will Munson, As the World Turns)

=== Outstanding Younger Actress in a Drama Series ===
- Vail Bloom (Heather Stevens, The Young and the Restless)
- **Jennifer Landon (Gwen Munson, As the World Turns)**
- Rachel Melvin (Chelsea Brady, Days of Our Lives)
- Emily O'Brien (Jana Hawkes, The Young and the Restless)
- Tammin Sursok (Colleen Carlton, The Young and the Restless)

=== Outstanding Drama Series Writing Team ===
- The Bold and the Beautiful (CBS)
- General Hospital (ABC)
- Guiding Light (CBS)
- **One Life to Live (ABC)**
- The Young and the Restless (CBS)

=== Outstanding Drama Series Directing Team ===
- All My Children (ABC)
- The Bold and the Beautiful (CBS)
- General Hospital (ABC)
- **One Life to Live (ABC)**

=== Outstanding Morning Program ===
- American Morning (CNN)
- **Good Morning America (ABC)**
- The Today Show (NBC)

=== Outstanding Talk Show Entertainment ===
- The Ellen DeGeneres Show (syndicated)
- **Rachael Ray (syndicated)**
- The View (ABC)

=== Outstanding Talk Show Host ===
- **Ellen DeGeneres, The Ellen DeGeneres Show (syndicated)**
- Barbara Walters, Whoopi Goldberg, Rosie O'Donnell, Joy Behar, Elisabeth Hasselbeck and Sherri Shepherd, The View (ABC)
- Regis Philbin, Kelly Ripa, Live with Regis and Kelly (syndicated)

=== Outstanding Game/Audience Participation Show ===
- **Cash Cab (Discovery)**
- Jeopardy! (syndicated)
- The Price is Right (CBS)

=== Outstanding Game Show Host ===
- Ben Bailey, Cash Cab (Discovery)
- **Alex Trebek, Jeopardy (syndicated)**
- Pat Sajak, Wheel of Fortune (syndicated)

=== Outstanding Legal/Courtroom Program ===
- **Cristina's Court (syndicated)**
- Judge David Young (syndicated)
- Judge Hatchett (syndicated)
- Judge Judy (syndicated)
- The People's Court (syndicated)

=== Outstanding Lifestyle Program ===
- **Everyday Italian (Food Network)**
- Gourmet's Diary of a Foodie (PBS)
- Lidia's Italy (PBS)
- Nigella Express (Food Network)
- Witch Crafts (DIY)

=== Outstanding Lifestyle Host ===
- Ina Garten, Barefoot Contessa (Food Network)
- Bobby Flay, Boy Meets Grill (Food Network)
- **Giada De Laurentiis, Everyday Italian (Food Network)**
- Todd English, Food Trip with Todd English (PBS)
- Nigella Lawson, Nigella Express (Food Network)

=== Outstanding Pre-School Children's Series ===
- Between the Lions (PBS)
- Blue's Room (Nick Jr.)
- Jack's Big Music Show (Noggin)
- **Sesame Street (PBS)**
- Super Why! (PBS)

=== Outstanding Children's Animated Program ===
- Arthur (PBS)
- Charlie and Lola (Disney)
- **Curious George (PBS)**
- Little Einsteins (Disney)
- Peep and the Big Wide World (Discovery Kids)

=== Outstanding Performer In An Animated Program ===
- Danica Lee (Ming-Ming Duckling, Wonder Pets!) (Nick Jr.)
- Kevin Michael Richardson (Joker, The Batman) (Kids' WB)
- Christopher Lloyd (The Hacker, Cyberchase) (PBS)
- **Eartha Kitt (Yzma, The Emperor's New School) (Disney)**
- Jessica DiCicco (Malina, The Emperor's New School) (Disney)

=== Outstanding Special Class Series ===
- Cause Effect (mtvU)
- Instant Beauty Pageant (Style)
- **Made (MTV)**
- Samantha Brown: Passport to Latin America (Travel)
- Split Ends (Style)

=== Outstanding Children's Series ===
There was a tie for the win.

- Design Squad (PBS)
- **Greatest Inventions with Bill Nye** (Discovery)
- **Jack Hanna's Into the Wild** (syndicated)
- Postcards from Buster (PBS)

=== Outstanding Performer In A Children's Series ===
- Kevin Clash (Elmo, Sesame Street) (PBS)
- Jack Hanna (Himself, Jack Hanna's Into The Wild) (syndicated)
- John Tartaglia (John, Johnny and the Sprites) (Disney)
- **Bindi Irwin (Herself, Bindi the Jungle Girl) (Discovery Kids)**
- Rachel Coleman (Rachel, Signing Time!) (PBS)

=== Outstanding Achievement in Music Direction and Composition ===
- **Wonder Pets!** (**Nick Jr**)
- Legion Of Super Heroes (CW)
- Tom and Jerry Tales (Warner Bros.)
- Between The Lions (PBS)
- Barbie Fairytopia: Magic Of The Rainbow (Nickelodeon)

Outstanding Special Class Animated Program

- Back at the Barnyard (Nickelodeon)
- **The Backyardigans (Nick Jr.)**
- The Batman (Kids' WB)
- Ben 10 (Cartoon Network)
- My Friends Tigger & Pooh (Disney)

=== Outstanding Individual Achievement in Animation ===
- **Sandra Equihua (El Tigre: The Adventures of Manny Rivera)**
- **Bob Boyle (Wow! Wow! Wubbzy!)**
- **Peter Ferk (Growing Up Creepie)**

=== Outstanding Sound Editing - Live Action and Animation ===
- **Timothy J. Borquez, Thomas Syslo, Doug Andham, Keith Dickens, Erik Foreman, Eric Freeman, Tony Orozco, Mark Keatts, Mike Garcia and Mark Keefer (The Batman)**
- Nick Nolan, Robbi Smith, Robert Poole II (Curious George)
- Bob Schott (Johnny and the Sprites)
- Mike Garcia, Mark Keatts, Mark Keefer and Robert Hargreaves (Legion of Super Heroes)
- Timothy Borquez, Tom Syslo, Doug Andham, Keith Dickens, Daisuke Sawa, Mark Keatts, Michael Garcia, Mark Keefer and George Nemzer (Loonatics Unleashed)

=== Outstanding Sound Mixing - Live Action and Animation ===
- **Doug Andham, Timothy J. Borquez and Eric Freeman (The Batman)**
- Bob Schott, Gary Silver, Michael Croiter and Matthias Winter (Johnny and the Sprites)
- Blake Norton, Bob Schott, Jim Czak and Dick Maitland (Sesame Street)
- Robert Hargreaves and John Hegedes (Legion of Super Heroes)
- Alexander Hall, Robert Hargreaves and John Hegedes (Tom and Jerry Tales)

=== Lifetime Achievement Award ===
- **Regis Philbin**
