= List of Signing Time! episodes =

Episodes of 2002 American TV series

This is a list of episodes for the series Signing Time!, which was released on home video and was also aired on various PBS stations for approximately three years, and has produced two series. Baby Signing Time! has four episodes, which aired between 2005 and 2008. Practice Time! has only two episodes, which aired in 2006.

== Series overview ==
Season / Series	Episodes	Originally aired	
Season / Series	Episodes	First aired	Last aired
1	13	May 1, 2002	March 26, 2006
2	13	August 31, 2007	July 1, 2008
Baby Signing Time!	4	2005	2008
Practice Time!	2	April 26, 2006	June 23, 2006

== Signing Time! ==
=== Series 1 (2002–2006) ===
No. overall	No. in season	Title	Directed by	Written by	Original release date	Prod. code
1	1	"My First Signs"	Emilie de Azevedo Brown; Jon Pierre Francia	Unknown	May 1, 2002	101
Three-year-old Alex, his deaf four-year-old cousin Leah, and host Rachel Coleman (the mother of Leah), teach beginning American Sign Language (ASL) signs. ASL Signs: Eat, Milk, Water, Ball, More, Bird, Cat, Dog, Fish, Car, Airplane, Want, Shoes, Flower, Mom, Dad, Baby, Sleep Song: "Show Me a Sign"
2	2	"Playtime Signs"	Emilie de Azevedo Brown; Jon Pierre Francia	Unknown	November 1, 2002	102
Alex, Leah, and Rachel teach ASL signs related to sharing, toys, manners, and more. ASL Signs: Friend, Play, Train, Doll, Bike, Bear, Please, Share, Your Turn, My Turn, Thank You, Book, Read, Socks, Yes, No, Thirsty, Drink, Dirty, Clean, Potty, Wash Hands, Bath, Hurt, Sorry, Go, Stop, Wait, Grandma, Grandpa Songs: "Magic Words," "Look at My Hands," "Part of Life," "The Good"
3	3	"Everyday Signs"	Emilie de Azevedo Brown; Jon Pierre Francia	Unknown	November 4, 2002	103
Alex, Leah, and Rachel teach ASL signs for the things children see, do and experience every day. ASL Signs: Hungry, Apple, Cookie, Cereal, Banana, Bread, Cheese, Cracker, Ice Cream, Candy, Help, Full, Hot, Cold, Dry, Wet, Like, Don't Like, Day, Sun, Night, Moon, Stars, Happy, Laugh, Sad, Cry, Boy, Girl Songs: "Silly Pizza Song," "Rainy Day," "Good Night Baby," "Proud to Be Me"
4	4	"Family, Feelings, and Fun"	Doug Chamberlain	Chris Bowman; Doug Chamberlain	December 14, 2004	104
Alex, Leah, and Rachel teach ASL signs for family members, feelings, and things outside. ASL Signs: House, Home, Family, Brother, Sister, Son, Daughter, Uncle, Aunt, Cousin, Tree, Wind, Leaves, Grass, Clouds, Rain, Snow, Coat, Boots, Gloves, Hat, Feelings, Grumpy, Surprised, Silly, Scared, Excited, Sick, Love Songs: "In a House," "Beautiful Day," "Feelings," "We've Got Love"
5	5	"ABC Signs"	Doug Chamberlain	Chris Bowman; Doug Chamberlain	December 14, 2004	105
Alex, Leah, their frog Hopkins, and Rachel teach the alphabet in American Sign Language. Vocabulary Words: Alex, Alligator, Best Friends, Baseball, Caterpillar, Diaper, Dance, Elevator, Funny, Fright, Good Morning, Good Night, Hopkins, Helicopter, Ice, Juice, King, Kiss, Leah, Mouse, Nice, Never, Owls, Picnic, Peanut Butter, Quiet, Ready, Run, Sit, Swim, Tree, Tired, Under, Umbrella, Vacation, Work, X-ray, Yo-yo, Zipper Letters in ASL: A, B, C, D, E, F, G, H, I, J, K, L, M, N, O, P, Q, R, S, T, U, V, W, X, Y, Z Numbers in ASL: 1, 2, 3, 4, 5, 6, 7, 8, 9, 10 Songs: "A is for Alex and Alligator," "LMNO," "Lonely Letter X"
6	6	"My Favorite Things"	Doug Chamberlain	Chris Bowman; Doug Chamberlain	December 14, 2004	106
Alex, Leah, Hopkins, and Rachel teach ASL signs for colors of the rainbow, fruits and vegetables, and physical activities. ASL Signs: Colors, Red, Orange, Yellow, Green, Blue, Purple, Rainbow, Fruit, Strawberry, Pear, Peach, Grapes, Watermelon, Vegetable, Carrot, Corn, Lettuce, Bean, Potato, Walk, Run, Sit, Swing, Dance, Sing, Jump, Swim Songs: "The Rainbow Song," "5 A Day," "I'm Really Good," "Shine"
7	7	"Leah's Farm"	Travis Babcock	Unknown	January 12, 2005	107
Alex, Leah, Hopkins, and Rachel teach ASL signs for farm animals. ASL Signs: Farm, Chicken, Horse, Goat, Mouse, Rooster, Sheep, Cow, Donkey, Pig, Turkey, Pet, Cat, Dog, Fish, Bird, Squirrel, Duck, Rabbit, Snail, Frog, Snake, Lizard, Turtle Songs: "Leah's Farm," "Did You Know?" "Turtle Rock," "Good Night to Leah's Farm" Special Thanks to: Wheeler Farm, Murray, Utah
8	8	"The Great Outdoors"	Travis Babcock	Unknown	February 19, 2006	108
Alex, Leah, Hopkins, and Rachel teach ASL signs for animals, bugs, activities and objects one would encounter in the woods or a backyard. ASL Signs: Backyard, Explore, Tent, Trail, Bridge, Stream, Forest, Mountain, Porcupine, Raccoon, Deer, Bear, Owl, Skunk, Beaver, Wolf, Eagle, Fox, Bug, Ant, Fly, Spider, Bee, Worm, Mosquito, Caterpillar, Butterfly Songs: "My Great Backyard," "Right Place, Right Time," "When the Bugs Come Marching In," "Caterpillar Dreams"
9	9	"The Zoo Train"	Travis Babcock	Unknown	February 26, 2006	109
Alex, Leah, Hopkins, and Rachel teach ASL signs for animals often seen at the zoo. ASL Signs: Rhinoceros, Bat, Seal, Panda, Hippopotamus, Zebra, Tiger, Lion, Monkey, Kangaroo, Camel, Gorilla, Crocodile, Elephant, Penguin, Giraffe, Starfish, Shrimp, Lobster, Crab, Octopus, Dolphin, Whale, Shark Songs: "The Zoo Train," "Walking Through the Zoo," "In the Water," "Guess What I Am" Special Thanks to: Sea World of California
10	10	"My Day"	Travis Babcock	Unknown	March 5, 2006	110
Alex, Leah, Hopkins, and Rachel teach ASL signs for daily activities. ASL Signs: Awake, Good Morning, Brush Hair, Comb Hair, Brush Teeth, Floss Teeth, Clothes, Get Dressed, Shirt, Shorts, Pants, Sweater, Dress, Skirt, Choose, Pretend, Imagination, Game, Blocks, Build, Puzzle, Fun, Clean Up, Pajamas, Bed, Pillow, Blanket, Light, Good Night, Dream Songs: "I'm Awake," "When I Get Dressed," "Imagination," "Bedtime Round"
11	11	"My Neighborhood"	Travis Babcock	Unknown	March 12, 2006	111
Alex, Leah, Hopkins, and Rachel teach ASL signs for playground activities, vehicles, places to go and people to see in a neighborhood. ASL Signs: Playground, Rollerskate, Picnic, Kite, Swing, Slide, Climb, Sand, Helicopter, Bus, Boat, Motorcycle, Slow, Fast, Store, Buy, Stamp, Mail, Library, Story, Office, Work, Restaurant, Firefighter, Police Officer, Doctor, Nurse Songs: "Down at the Park," "Watch Me Go," "My Job," "In My Neighborhood," "Every Day"
12	12	"Time To Eat"	Travis Babcock	Unknown	March 19, 2006	113
Alex, Leah, Hopkins, and Rachel invite viewers to breakfast, lunch, and dinner. Signs and songs for cooking, eating, setting the table, and favorite foods are taught. ASL Signs: Grow, Garden, Every Day, Cook, Kitchen, Make, Fork, Plate, Napkin, Knife, Spoon, Cup, Bowl, Breakfast, Lunch, Dinner, Dessert, "May I be excused?", Egg, Sandwich, Soup, Popcorn, Peas, Tomato, Salad, Spaghetti Songs: "The Garden Song," "Let it Cook," Set the Table," Breakfast, Lunch, and Dinner," "Silly Pizza Song II"
13	13	"Welcome To School"	Travis Babcock	Unknown	March 26, 2006	112
Alex and Leah head off to school as they teach signs and sing songs about things to do and see in the classroom. ASL Signs: Crayons, Scissors, Paper, Glue, Pen, Pencil, Table, Chair, Backpack, School, Line Up, Pay Attention, Learn, Remember, Smart, Principal, Teacher, Class, Student, Name, Word, Write, Numbers, Count, Draw, Paint, Read, Quiet, Rest Songs: "Welcome to School," "Hello Backpack," "Learning Centers," "On My Way Home"

=== Series 2 (2007–2008) ===
No. overall	No. in season	Title	Directed by	Written by	Original release date	Prod. code
14	1	"Nice to Meet You"	Damian Dayton	Michael Buster	August 31, 2007	201
Alex, Leah, Hopkins, and Rachel teach signs and phrases that viewers can use to meet and greet new friends. ASL Signs: "My name is...", "What is your name?", Old, New, "Nice to meet you.", Alike, Different, Friend, "How are you?", Fine, Stay, Fun, "See you later." Learning modules: ABC Time and Counting Time Songs: "Nice to Meet You," "ABC Song," "Counting Song"
15	2	"Happy Birthday to You"	Damian Dayton	Chris Burke	August 31, 2007	202
It's Leah's birthday, and Alex, Leah, Hopkins, Rachel invite viewers to Leah's birthday party, where they learn signs and phrases for all the birthday fun. ASL Signs: Happy Birthday, Party, Cake, Game, Present, Candle, Wish, Hat, Invite, Friends, Thank You Learning modules: Counting Time and Story Time Songs: "Today is a Special Day," "Laa-Dee-Da-Dee Happy Birthday," "Counting Song," "I'd Love to Read a Book" Story: "Happy Birthday's Friends" by Chris Burke
16	3	"Move and Groove"	Damian Dayton	Paul Eagleston	August 31, 2007	203
Alex, Leah, Hopkins, and Rachel teach viewers signs for all the different ways to move their bodies. ASL Signs: Dance, Jump, Spin, Walk, Run, March, Bike, Hike, Swim, Shake, Freeze, Sway, Kick Learning modules: ABC Time and Game Time Songs: "Groove with Me," "ABC Song," "I'd Love to Play a Game"
17	4	"My Favorite Season"	Damian Dayton	Michael Buster	November 13, 2007	208
Alex, Leah, Hopkins, and Rachel take viewers on a signing journey through the seasons. ASL Signs: Seasons, Weather, Favorite, Summer, Hot, Autumn, Cool, Winter, Cold, Spring, Warm, Year Learning modules: Moving Time and Game Time Songs: "My Favorite Season," "Groove with Me (Moving Time!)," "I'd Love to Play a Game"
18	5	"Going Outside"	Damian Dayton	Chris Burke	November 13, 2007	207
Alex, Leah, Hopkins, and Rachel teach viewers signs for things in nature. ASL Signs: Outside, Sun, Flowers, Grass, Bug, Today, Wind, Trees, Leaves, Sky, Clouds, Rain, Thunder, Snow Learning modules: Hopping Time and Story Time Songs: "Outside," "Hopkins Hop," "I'd Love to Read a Book" Story: "My Favorite Pet" by Linda de Azevedo
19	6	"Days of the Week"	Damian Dayton	Michael Buster	November 13, 2007	213
The Signing Time friends teach viewers to sign all seven days of the week. ASL Signs: Day, Week, Sunday, Monday, Tuesday, Wednesday, Thursday, Friday, Saturday, Weekend, Again Learning modules: Moving Time and Counting Time Songs: "Days of the Week," "Groove with Me (Moving Time!)," "Counting Song"
20	7	"My Favorite Sport"	Damian Dayton	Michael Buster	November 13, 2007	211
Alex, Leah, Hopkins, and Rachel teach viewers signs for things related to sports. ASL Signs: Team, Football, Practice, Baseball, Coach, Sports, Soccer, Lose, Win, Basketball, Game Learning modules: Hopping Time and Game Time Songs: "My Team and I," "Hopkins Hop," "I'd Love to Play a Game"
21	8	"My House"	Damian Dayton	Chris Burke	April 24, 2008	205
Alex, Leah, Hopkins and Rachel take a singing and signing tour of the rooms and objects in a house. ASL Signs: Kitchen, Refrigerator, Freezer, Stove, Sink, Family Room, Sofa, Rug, Table, TV, Bathroom, Bathtub, Shower Learning modules: Hopping Time and Game Time Songs: "My House," "Hopkins Hop," "I'd Love to Play a Game"
22	9	"My Things"	Damian Dayton	Michael Buster	April 24, 2008	209
Alex, Leah and Hopkins teach signs for the things in the treehouse and return every toy to its “right place.” ASL Signs: Clean Up, Room, Make The Bed, Shoes, Toys, Books, Blocks, Coat, Mittens, Hat, Socks, Closet Learning modules: Game Time and Counting Time Songs: "My Things Have a Right Place," "I'd Love to Play a Game," "Counting Song"
23	10	"Helping Out Around the House"	Damian Dayton	Chris Burke	April 24, 2008	212
Alex, Leah, Hopkins, and Rachel teach viewers signs for household chores. ASL Signs: Help, Wash Clothes, Fold, Washcloth, Towel, Socks, Clear The Table, Do The Dishes, Sweep, Broom, Dustpan, Vacuum, Dust Learning modules: ABC Time and Story Time Songs: "Helping Out Around the House," "ABC Song," "I'd Love to Read a Book" Story: "Rainbow Salad" by Rachel Coleman
24	11	"Once Upon a Time"	Damian Dayton	Chris Burke	July 1, 2008	206
The Signing Time friends discover the joy of books through songs and signs. ASL Signs: "Once Upon A Time...", Beginning, Story, Together, Read, Page, Word, Book, Write, Learn, Favorite, Pee-Yew Learning modules: ABC Time and Story Time Songs: "We Sit Down Together," "Pick a Book," "ABC Song," "I'd Love to Read a Book" Story: "Counting Sheep" by Heather Ravarino
25	12	"Box of Crayons"	Damian Dayton	Michael Buster	July 1, 2008	204
Alex, Leah, Hopkins, and Rachel teach the signs for colors like pink, orange, purple and green. ASL Signs: Red, Yellow, Orange, Green, Crayons, Blue, Pink, Purple, White, Black, Brown, Silver, Gold Colors: Red, Yellow Learning modules: Hopping Time and Story Time Songs: "Box of Crayons," "Hopkins Hop," "I'd Love to Read a Book" Story: "Rainbow Salad" by Rachel Coleman
26	13	"Who Has the Frog?"	Damian Dayton	Chris Burke	July 1, 2008	210
Alex and Leah can't find Hopkins, so they go on a journey to find him. During this journey Alex, Leah, and Rachel teach viewers how to sign question words like "who," "what," "where," "when," and "how." ASL Signs: Frog, Lost, Who, Where, How, Why, When, Find, Which, What, Guess Learning modules: ABC Time and Story Time Songs: "Who Has the Frog?" "ABC Song," "I'd Love to Read a Book" Story: "Counting Sheep" by Heather Ravarino

== Baby Signing Time! ==
No.	Title	Original release date
1	"It's Baby Signing Time!"	2005
It's Baby Signing Time! with Baby Alex, Baby Leah, and Baby Hopkins! ASL Signs: Eat, Drink, Cracker, Water, Cereal, Milk, Banana, Juice, All Done, Mom, Dad, Grandma, Grandpa, Diaper, Potty, More, Bird, Fish, Cat, Dog, Horse, Frog, Hurt Songs: "Eat & Drink," "The Pets I Love," "More, More, More," "Mom Has a Mom," "Diaper Dance," "A Hard Day," "It's Baby Signing Time!"
2	"Here I Go"	2005
Baby Alex, Baby Leah, Baby Hopkins, and Rachel teach ASL signs for vehicles. ASL Signs: Shoes, Socks, Hat, Coat, Please, Thank You, Sorry, Car, Train, Bus, Bike, Airplane, Boat, Ball, Doll, Bear, Wash Hands, Soap, Sleep, Bath, Pajamas, Brush Teeth, Book, Blanket Songs: "One Shoe," "Please, Thank You, and Sorry," "Here I Go," "I Can Keep It Still," "I Wash My Hands," "Sleep Song," "Special to Me"
3	"A New Day"	2008
Baby Alex, Baby Leah, Baby Hopkins, and Rachel teach ASL signs for things in nature. ASL Signs: Day, New, Outside, Wind, Rain, Snow, Sun, Cloud, Sky, Tree, Grass, Flower, Leaf, Stop, Go, Wait, Again, Bug, Up, Down, Star, Moon, Night Songs: "A New Day," "Outside, Outside," "Sunny Day," "Strollin'," "Stop & Go," "I'm a Bug," "Starry Night," "Nighttime is the Right Time," "Tiny Hands"
4	"Let's Be Friends"	2008
Baby Alex, Baby Leah, Baby Hopkins, and Rachel teach ASL signs for feelings, opposites, foods, outside, and toys. ASL Signs: Friend, Play, Share, Nice, Feel, Sad, Cry, Happy, Laugh, Hot, Cold, Yes, No, Dirty, Clean, You, Me, Apple, Pear, Carrot, Peach, Juice, Bubbles, Balloon, Telephone, Game, Music Songs: "Let's Be Friends," "Can You Feel It?" "Opposites," "That Tastes Good," "In the Sky," "Toy Box," "Show Me a Sign"

== Practice Time! ==
No.	Title	Original release date
1	"ABC's"	April 26, 2006
Rachel teaches all 26 letters of the English alphabet in American Sign Language. ASL Sign: Alphabet Letters in ASL: A, B, C, D, E, F, G, H, I, J, K, L, M, N, O, P, Q, R, S, T, U, V, W, X, Y, Z Song: "ABC Song"
2	"123s"	June 23, 2006
Rachel teaches all the numbers from 1 to 20 in American Sign Language. ASL Signs: Numbers and Count Numbers in ASL: 1, 2, 3, 4, 5, 6, 7, 8, 9, 10, 11, 12, 13, 14, 15, 16, 17, 18, 19, 20 Song: "Counting to 20"
