= Saturday's Warrior =

1989 American film

- Directed by: Bob Williams
- Written by: Douglass Stewart
- Produced by: Bob Williams; Gary Lewis
- Starring: Erik Hickenlooper; Cori Jacobsen; Davison Cheney; Bart Hickenlooper
- Music by: Lex de Azevedo
- Distributed by: Fieldbrook Entertainment
- Release date: 1989
- Country: United States
- Language: English

Saturday's Warrior is a religious-themed musical written by Douglass Stewart and Lex de Azevedo about a family who are members of the Church of Jesus Christ of Latter-day Saints (LDS Church/Mormon). The musical tells the story of a group of children that are born into a Latter-day Saint family after making various promises in the premortal life. Two of the children, Jimmy and Julie, encounter personal struggles that help them rediscover and fulfill their foreordained missions in life. Although no explicit time frame is given in the dialogue, certain contextual clues (in particular, a song that references the Zero population growth movement) suggest that the story takes place in the then-current and then-recent period of the late 1960s or early '70s, similar to other religious musicals such as Godspell and Jesus Christ Superstar.

The musical explores the Latter-day Saint doctrines and views on the plan of salvation, premortal life, foreordination, and eternal marriage. It depicts abortion and birth control as being contrary to the divine plan of salvation.

Saturday's Warrior was first performed in California in 1973 as a college project. In early spring 1974, the play was performed at Brigham Young University's (BYU) Spring Arts Festival by a cast of BYU students. Bob Williams made a video version of the musical in 1989, setting it on a stage as opposed to giving the movie a more naturalistic look. It is among the first popular LDS films to not be made or sponsored by the LDS Church or BYU. Stewart wrote two sequels, Star Child (music by Gaye Beeson) which debuted in 1981, and The White Star (music by Janice Kapp Perry) which debuted in 2007. In 2016, de Azevedo and Stewart produced another filmed remake with a more naturalized look.

== Plot ==
While in the pre-mortal life waiting in the pre-mortal life, eight siblings promise one another that they will always be there for one another ("Pullin' Together"). The youngest, Emily, is afraid that when her turn to be born comes around, their parents will be tired of having kids, and she won't be born into their family. The oldest, Jimmy, promises Emily that he will personally see to it that she is born into their family. Meanwhile, second-oldest sister Julie and Tod, another spirit in the pre-mortal life, promise each other that they will somehow find each other on Earth and get married ("Circle of Our Love"). Two missionaries Wally and Harold in pre-mortal life decided to preach the gospel together on Earth ("Humble Way").

Upon reaching Earth, however, no one remembers the promises they made before they were born. Julie finds herself desperately in love with Wally Kestler, who is now leaving to serve a two-year mission. Julie promises that she'll wait for him ("Will I Wait For You?"). Jimmy is a typical confused teenager, rebellious against his parents and influenced by peer pressure. He finds himself in the company of other teenagers who are critical of his parents for having such a large family and advocate philosophies such as zero population growth and legalized abortion ("Zero Population"). Because of their influence, he becomes upset when he learns that his parents are expecting another baby, not remembering that it's Emily. Jimmy's twin sister Pam, who has medical problems and can't walk, talks to him and tries to help him sort things out ("Line Upon Line"), but Jimmy is still confused and leaves home to live with his friends. But when he has a chance encounter and conversation with a non-Mormon named Tod Richards ("Voices"), then gets a phone call from his family telling him that Pam has died, and meets Emily in Heaven. They joyously reunite, then Emily asks Pam, "Pam, Why are things happened?" Pam doesn't know all the reasons to Emily, he begins some serious personal reflection ("Brace Me Up"). He decides to return to his family.

Meanwhile, Julie gets engaged to another man, Peter, and writes a "Dear John letter" to Wally while he's still on his mission ("He's Just a Friend/Dear John"). Wally is devastated, but his companion, Elder Green, convinces him to "shape up" and keep preaching the Gospel ("Humble Way"). Though the two companions have not had much success proselytizing, they find Tod, who has been searching for answers ("Paper Dream") and teach him by the Spirit. Julie decides that she doesn't want to marry Peter after all, but when Wally comes home from his mission, he brings Tod with him, and Julie realizes he's the man she's been searching for all her life ("Feelings of Forever"). At the climax of the movie, Pam stays in heaven, and say goodbye as Pam must ascend into the afterlife at the same time as Emily must descend from the pre-life into her new mortal body as she is born. The main title song, "Saturday's Warrior", is played as a finale.

== Production history ==
Saturday's Warrior was first produced at BYU in the spring of 1974 with Stewart, de Azevedo, and Harold Oaks, of the BYU theatrical department, being the moving forces behind the production. Azevedo was only lightly involved with the BYU production but later in 1974 staged a production in Los Angeles that was billed as having the original cast.

A 1975 run in Salt Lake City and Spanish Fork, Utah was very successful.

== Cast ==
=== 1974 Version ===
- Ric de Azevedo as Tod
- Heather Young as Julie
- Donna Conkling as Matron
- Cam Clarke as Jimmy
- Shawn Engemann as Pam
- Janae Ward as Alice
- Shannon Engemann aa Shelly
- Tracy Ward as Benjy
- Jonathan Ward as Ernie
- Yvette Ward as Emily
- Jerry Carter as Wally
- Alan Akin as Harold Greene
- Marilyn King Larsen as Female Announcer
- Bob Clarke as TV Announcer
- Bob Engemann & Karl Engemann as Mr. Flinders
- Gerri Engemann as Mrs. Filnders
- Paul Engemann as Mack

=== 1989 Version ===
- Erik Hickenlooper as Jimmy
- Cori Jacobsen as Julie
- Davison Cheney as Tod
- Bart Hickenlooper as Wally
- D.L. Walker as Harold Greene
- Marianne Thompson as Pam
- Marvin Payne as Dad
- Gay Parvis as Mom
- Patricia Clinger Barbour, Debby Clinger, Lessa Clinger, David White & Cam Walker as Mack's Friends
- Steve Hansen, Rick Pelton & David White as Missionaries
- Kay Pinkston, Sharon Pettgrew & Evelyn Converse as Girlfriends
- Mary Greenwood as Shelly
- Jared Christensen as Benjy
- Kelsi Osborn as Alice
- Matthew Lewis as Ernie
- Rebecca Tate as Emily
- Michelle Schaertl as Baby Emily
- Judy Hibbert as Matron
- Travis Tanner as Mack
- Judy Gubler as Angel

== Musical numbers ==
Musical Numbers, as included in the original play soundtrack:

- "Saturday's Warrior"
- "Tod is Going Down to Earrh" (VV)
- "Circle of Our Love"
- "Pullin' Together"
- "Humble Way"
- "Jimmy and Pam Kept A Secret" (VV)
- "Sailing On"
- "Jimmy and Pam Going Down to Earth" (FV)
- "Will I Wait For You?"
- "Daddy's Nose"
- "Zero Population"
- "Didn't We Love Him?"
- "Line Upon Line"
- "He's Just a Friend/Dear John"
- "Paper Dream"
- "Paper Dream" (Julie version) (VV)
- "Circle of Our Love Reprise I" (VV)
- "Summer of Fair Weather"
- "Saturday's Warrior Reprise" (SV)
- "Jimmy, Why Didn't You Keep Your Promise?" (VV)
- "Line Upon Line Reprise" (VV)
- "Voices" (SV)
- "Pam Reunites with Emily" (FV)
- "Brace Me Up"
- "Brace Me Up Production Number"
- "The Prodigal Son Returns Home" (VV)
- "Paper Dream Reprise"
- "Tod's Conversion" (VV)
- "Humble Way Reprise" (VV)
- "Feelings of Forever"
- "We're Gonna Be Roommates" (VV)
- "Circle of Our Love Reprise II" (VV)
- "I Love You, Emily" (VV)
- "Saturday's Warrior Finale"
- "Saturday's Warrior Theme" (VV)

(SV) Stage Version only
(VV) Video Version only

== Reception ==
Saturday's Warrior is not well-known outside the LDS Church. The themes of Saturday's Warrior, however, resound with many church members, especially regarding "the last days".

The Los Angeles Times reviewer described the production as "pleasant lively and well-sung,... with an emphasis on close family ties."

== 2016 film ==
After resisting the idea for many years, de Azevedo and Stewart decided to make a film version of the musical, which opened in 2016. The film is directed by Michael Buster, who co-wrote the script with Heather Ravarino.

de Azevedo wrote three new songs for the movie version.

=== Production ===
The force behind this production largely came from de Azevedo's daughters, Emilie and Rachel. It has been criticized as having very poor production quality. Others have felt it was a well-produced work that truly moved the stage production into the realm of film.

=== Cast ===
- Kenny Holland as Jimmy Flinders
- Jacob Buster as Ernie Flinders
- Monica Moore Smith as Julie Flinders
- Mason D. Davis as Tod Richards
- Bailee M. Johnson as Shelley Flinders
- Caroline Labrum as Alice Flinders
- Pete Day as Mr. Kestler
- Katie E. Curran as Flight Attendant
- Grace Hallows as Grace
- Carlton Bluford as Mack
- Chelsea Jurkiewicz as Bus Girl
- Alex Boyé as The Heavenly Guide
- Anna Daines as Pam Flinders
- Brian Clark as Adam Flinders
- Alison Akin Clark as Terri Flinders
- Morgan Gunter as Elder Greene
- Clint Pulver as Elder Kestler
- James Bounous as Peter

=== Cameo ===
- The Piano Guys

=== Crew ===
- Michael Buster (Director/Writer)
- Lex de Azevedo (Writer/Executive Producer/Producer)
- Heather Ravarino (Writer)
- Duane Andersen (co-producer)
- Emilie de Azevedo Brown (Executive Producer)
- Rachel Coleman (Executive Producer)
- Jarrod Phillips (Producer)
- Bonnie Story (Choreographer)

=== Soundtrack ===
#	Title	Performer(s)	Music by	Lyric by	Length
1	"Blink of an Eye"	Alex Boyé and Gospel Choir	Lex de Azevedo	Lex de Azevedo, Heather Ravarino, and Doug Stewart	4:28
2	"The Circle of Our Love"	Christeena Michelle Riggs, Justin Williams, and Millennium Choir	Lex de Azevedo	Doug Stewart	3:11
3	"Pullin' Together"	Brian Neal Clark, Alison Akin Clark, Kenny Holland, Anna Daines, Monica Moore Smith, Bailee Johnson, Caroline Labrum, Ethan Mouser, Jacob Buster, and Chloe Ravarino	Lex de Azevedo	Doug Stewart	3:11
4	"Humble Way"	Dallin Major, Aaron de Azevedo, Alex Boyé, Tim Drisdom, and Gospel Choir	Lex de Azevedo	Doug Stewart	2:54
5	"Sailing On"	Kenny Holland and Millennium Choir	Lex de Azevedo	Doug Stewart	5:08
6	"Zero Population"	Kenny Holland, Carleton Bluford, Jenny Frogley, Aaron de Azevedo, Dallin Major, and Talmage Egan	Lex de Azevedo	Doug Stewart	2:59
7	"Didn't We Love Him?"	Alison Akin Clark, Brian Neal Clark, Kenny Holland, and Millennium Choir	Lex de Azevedo	Doug Stewart	1:53
8	"Line Upon Line"	Kenny Holland, Anna Daines, and Millennium Choir	Lex de Azevedo	Doug Stewart	3:35
9	"Paper Dream"	Justin Williams and Millennium Choir	Lex de Azevedo	Doug Stewart	2:53
10	"Summer of Fair Weather"	Kenny Holland, Carleton Bluford, Jenny Frogley, Aaron de Azevedo, Dallin Major, and Talmage Egan	Lex de Azevedo	Doug Stewart	2:22
11	"Never Enough"	Kenny Holland, Carleton Bluford, Jenny Frogley, Aaron de Azevedo, Dallin Major, and Talmage Egan	Lex de Azevedo	Lex de Azevedo and Heather Ravarino	3:44
12	"There's Got to Be More"	Justin Williams, Chloe Ravarino, Zachary Brown, Emilie de Azevedo Brown, C.J. Drisdom, Timothy Drisdom, and Gospel Choir	Lex de Azevedo	Lex de Azevedo and Heather Ravarino	4:59
13	"Feelings of Forever"	Christeena Michelle Riggs, Justin Williams, and Millennium Choir	Lex de Azevedo	Doug Stewart	2:46
14	"Brace Me Up"	Kenny Holland	Lex de Azevedo	Doug Stewart	5:20
15	"Saturday's Warrior"	Kenny Holland, Anna Daines, and Millennium Choir	Lex de Azevedo	Doug Stewart	3:46
16	"More to This Life"	Kenny Holland	Lex de Azevedo and Kenny Holland	Lex de Azevedo, Kenny Holland, and Mason D. Davis	3:44
17	"I Will Find You"		Lex de Azevedo		1:13
18	"Promise, Jimmy?"		Lex de Azevedo		1:08
19	"Julie & Mom"		Lex de Azevedo		2:03
20	"Loss"		Lex de Azevedo		1:12
21	"Tod's Conversion"		Lex de Azevedo		1:07
22	"Journey Home"		Lex de Azevedo		2:16
23	"The Prodigal Son Returns"		Lex de Azevedo		1:24
24	"I Choose Emily"		Lex de Azevedo		1:36
25	"I've Seen That Smile"		Lex de Azevedo		1:45
26	"Pam's Letter"		Lex de Azevedo		1:21

== See also ==
- Added Upon
