= Black Heaven =

Japanese anime television series

課長王子
- Created by: Hiroki Hayashi
- Anime television series
- Directed by: Yasuhito Kikuchi
- Produced by: Hiroaki Inoue (AIC); Kazuaki Morijiri (AIC); Kinya Watanabe (AIC); Mie Ide (Pioneer LDC)
- Written by: Naruhisa Arakawa
- Music by: Kōichi Korenaga
- Studio: AIC, A.P.P.P.
- Licensed by: NA: Discotek Media
- Original network: WOWOW
- Original run: 8 July 1999 – 7 October 1999
- Episodes: 13

Black Heaven (課長王子, Kachō-Ōji), also referred to as The Legend of Black Heaven and Kacho-Ōji, is a Japanese anime television series conceptualized by Hiroki Hayashi and produced by Pioneer Corporation, Pioneer LDC Inc., AIC and A.P.P.P. It is directed by Yasuhito Kikuchi, with Naruhisa Arakawa handling series composition, Kazuto Nakazawa designing the characters and Kōichi Korenaga composing the music. The series is about the middle-aged members of a short-lived heavy metal band and their unexpected role in an alien interstellar war.

The Japanese title of the anime is a multi-layered pun; it can be translated as "Section Manager Ouji" or literally "Section Manager Prince."

== Plot summary ==
Middle-aged Ouji Tanaka has a wife, a child and a typical job as a salary man in Tokyo's modern society. But his life wasn't always so dull; fifteen years ago he was known as "Gabriel," lead guitar of a short-lived heavy metal band called "Black Heaven." Ouji's life takes a sudden turn when he is invited by an enigmatic woman to pick up his Gibson Flying V to display his guitar skills. Little does he know the ripple effects this will have on his family, or the other remaining members of Black Heaven, or on an alien interstellar war with a mysterious weapon, or on the fate of the planet Earth.

== Characters ==
Ouji Tanaka (田中 王児, Tanaka Ōji)
Voiced by: Kōji Ishii (Japanese); Beau Billingslea (English)
Formerly Gabriel, the lead guitarist of Black Heaven, Tanaka takes an office job following the break-up of the band to support his growing family. Years later, he's facing mid-life, wondering what went wrong, when Layla Yuki approaches him, asking him to play for her.
Layla (レイラ, Reira)
Voiced by: Miho Yamada (Japanese); Diva West (English)
A major in the Alien Army, she is tasked with tracking down Ouji and getting him on their side to play music in order to activate the ultimate weapon. After finding him, she basically plays the role of an agent, acting as the go between the band and Colonel Fomalhaut, the space army commander.
Yoshiko Tanaka (田中 良子, Tanaka Yoshiko)
Voiced by: Kae Araki (Japanese); Michelle Ruff (English)
A former groupie of Black Heaven, she marries Ouji when he finds out she is pregnant. She plays the role of the housewife and mother, watching in dismay as Ouji reverts to his rocker persona and suspicious that he may be having an affair with Layla. She is called "Yokko" by Ouji.
Gen Tanaka (田中 弦, Tanaka Gen)
Voiced by: Rikako Aikawa (Japanese); Brianne Siddall (English)
Ouji and Yoshiko's son, who has a fascination with an outer space television show that he watches daily. He also believes that Layla is a character from the show.
Kotoko (コトコ) Voiced by: Atsuko Enomoto (Japanese); Emilie Brown (English), Eriko (エリコ) Voiced by: Miwa Yanagihara (Japanese); Sherry Lynn (English), and Rinko (リンコ) Voiced by: Ayako Kawasumi (Japanese); Bambi Darro (English)
Layla's bumbling subordinates, who work in the same building as Ouji and Layla and help with her assignments. They are identified with their respective hair colors of blue, purple, and green. They are gullible to various rumors and often misinterpret human words and concepts.
Satou (佐藤)
Voiced by: Yūji Ueda (Japanese); Tom Fahn (English)
Formerly Michael of Black Heaven, he plays guitar and is the lead vocalist.
Yamada (山田)
Voiced by: Hidenari Ugaki (Japanese); Joe Romersa (English)
Formerly Luke of Black Heaven, he plays drums. After the break-up of the band, he went into the real-estate business.
Suzuki (鈴木)
Voiced by: Ryuzou Ishino (Japanese); Dan Lorge (English)
Formerly Raphael of Black Heaven, he plays bass. After the break-up of the band, he opened up a grocery store.
Watanabe (渡辺)
Voiced by: Atsushi Godai (Japanese); Steven Blum (English)
Formerly Joseph of Black Heaven, he played keyboard. After the break-up of the band, he went to New York to try to make it in the music business, only to meet an unfortunate end through an aggravated lobster and an insulted thug. His remains are recovered by "the enemy" and used to create a clone/android to combat the reunited Black Heaven.

== Episodes ==
No.	Title	Directed by	Written by	Original release date
1	"Stairway to Heaven" (Japanese: 天国への階段)	Masashi Abe	Naruhisa Arakawa	July 8, 1999
Ouji Tanaka starts the day by losing his beloved "Flying V" guitar twice because his wife wants to get rid of it. At work his boss harries him. Later, after work, he believes he is being seduced by his new coworker (an alien in disguise), Layla Yuki, who calls him by his old guitar hero name, "Gabe," and takes him to a model home that contains a "stairway to heaven," at the end of which he finds his guitar and starts to play his music that leads Layla to be sure that he is the "god" who will save her (alien) people. (The model home is actually a portal to the aliens' spaceship.) Ouji initially believes that Layla is a cosplayer freak, not a real alien.
2	"All Night Long" (Japanese: オールナイト・ロング)	Kazunari Kume	Naruhisa Arakawa	July 15, 1999
The next morning, Tanaka's son Gen accidentally destroys his prized autographed LP record by his idol Michael Schenker, and his wife is shown to be entirely unmoved by his loss. At work, Tanaka believes that his "stairway to heaven" experience from the night before was not a dream and confronts Layla, who publicly denies it but later takes him to the model home where Tanaka again plays his musical in "heavenly stairs". Although his wife nags him when he returns home after staying out all night with Layla, Tanaka is happy because he finds that others need his music. The Tanakas visit the model home complex, where they are approached by Laya and her assistants (Kotoko, Eriko, and Rinko). Yoshiko begins to suspect that her husband is having an affair with another woman but is distracted by Kotoko, Eriko, and Rinko.
3	"Hot House" (Japanese: ホット・ハウス)	Akihiro Izumi; Takuya Nonaka	Mitsuhiro Yamada	July 22, 1999
Spurred by busybody rumormongering neighbors, Yoshiko's suspicion that Ouji is cheating on her grows, though she tries to suppress it. It did not help matters that she spots Ouji with Layla, who later visits their house because Fomalhaut, the space army commander, is unconvinced that Ouji is the savior and wants her to do more "research" on him. At their house, Yoshiko becomes more jealous seeing Ouji share his passion for music, but has to leave the house to get her butcher's discounts; she also reflects somewhat guiltily that she had progressively threw away his records and musical equipment over the years (her excuse being that there is "no room" in their apartment). In the meantime, the bumbling Kotoko, Eriko, and Rinko gas both Ouji and Layla and place them seminude in bed in an attempt to induce lovemaking (they were apparently under the impression that it was necessary to trigger Ouji's weapons ability). Ouji and Layla awake in time and escape before Yoshiko finds them in bed to go on a mission, and Ouji is shown to play an extended riff that releases weapons to destroy enemy alien ships (albeit without his knowledge). Ouji returns home to find a note from Yoshiko reminding him of their anniversary, and she later presents him with a new "Flying V" guitar (though in a different color, red) as a gift.
4	"Space Child" (Japanese: スペース・チャイルド)	Susumu Ishizaki; Makoto Bessho	Naruhisa Arakawa	July 29, 1999
Ouji reluctantly babysits his son Gen because Yoshiko is going to her high school reunion, but feels compelled to play his guitar at the model house, leaving Gen behind in his haste. Meanwhile, the aliens' enemies are attacking, and despite the Commander's disbelief, Ouji's guitar playing fires the weapons to destroy them. However, after Gen also sneaked onto the ship via a model home after following his father there, the space ship recognizes Gen as an intruder, and Ouji has to rescue him by crossing rotating generator blades, which he is able to do by counting the beats, as with drumming. (The aliens themselves offer no assistance to Ouji or Gen.) Gen is impressed by Ouji less for saving him than believing that his father is friends with "Commander Nakamurabashi" in his favorite UFO space show "Flying 5," as she bears an uncanny resembling to Layla.
5	"These Are the Days" (Japanese: 輝ける日々)	Masashi Abe	Hiroshi Ōnogi	August 5, 1999
Ouji feels re-energized and dresses in his old rock outfits (blond wig, leather jacket, and leather pants, which he can't button anymore because he's gained weight) in an attempt to revive his rocker identity as "Gabriel." He is also composing a new song and even asks his old music store friend to contact his former band members. However, Yoshiko again is not supportive and has a fight with him in front of Gen. When later Ouji tries to play his new song, he has stage fright and the new song fails to fire the alien weapons; Ouji for the first time realizes that he is being asked to play not for his music, but that his "sound" is merely being used for the aliens' war, which dispirits him. When he is asked to play his old music for the battle, Ouji in frustration destroys his guitar and vows to quit music.
6	"Walk Away" (Japanese: ウォーク・アウェイ)	Kazunari Kume	Mitsuhiro Yamada; Naruhisa Arakawa	August 20, 1999
Ouji is in a funk because he's decided to quit music. Alien Chief Scientist Hamill vows to do anything she can to have Ouji play again. Meanwhile, Kotoko, Eriko, and Rinko try various futile methods to "inspire" Ouji, such as giving him a spikey punk haircut, impersonating fortune tellers, and setting up a skit at an amusement park where Ouji and his family are attending. As Ouji sits on a playground swing contemplating his decision to quit music, Layla comes by and hands him a "Flying V" guitar, but does not try to pressure him otherwise.
7	"In Need" (Japanese: イン・ニード)	Shintarō Inogawa	Naruhisa Arakawa	August 26, 1999
The aliens are under increasing attacks from their enemies. Hamill tries to persuade Ouji to play music, and he seems receptive by playing twice. However, the ultimate weapon mysteriously does not fire properly at first despite Ouji's playing normally, though Hamill believes she is gaining insight into human music. Layla has a fight with Hamill about the latter's tactics and tells Ouji about her ulterior motives; Layla is opposed to forcing Ouji to play for the aliens' purposes, and it is also revealed that Layla is the fiancee of Commander Fomalhaute. Ouji goes home and tries to reignite passions with Yoshiko, but it does not seem to help lift his spirits. However, he sees Gen getting up at night to watch "Flying 5" for the 4th time and seems to be inspired by Gen's dedication to show and the show's message of unity through numbers and cooperation.
8	"All Right Now" (Japanese: オールライト・ナウ)	Katsuhito Akiyama; Makoto Bessho	Hiroshi Ōnogi	September 2, 1999
Ouji invites his surviving former bandmates from Black Heaven, Satou/Michael, Yamada/Luke, and Suzuki/Raphael for drinks. They reminisce about the old times and Ouji tells him about the alien war and his music weapon; the bandmates do not take him seriously. Ouji, however, believes that his friends are ready to re-form the band. When Ouji plays by himself, he cannot get the ultimate weapon to fire at full power; the aliens are increasingly dependent on Ouji in their war. Ouji later tries to visit each band member's house, only to find that they all have moved on with their lives. Yoshiko again sits up all night waiting for Ouji to return home.
9	"Get Off of My Cloud" (Japanese: ひとりぼっちの世界)	Katsuyuki Kodera	Masaharu Amiya	September 9, 1999
Ouji attempts to recruit members for his new band, the New Black Heaven, and has his son Gen draw the "space attitude" recruitment poster. However, the new members are 2 argumentative UFO fanatics and an astrology nut who believes Ouji was her dog in a former life; not surprisingly, the band does not work out. The 3 stooges Kotoko, Eriko, and Rinko brought a number of people (including children) named "Bando," thinking that what is needed. The aliens are debating whether to have Ouji play solo or in a "band," a new concept the aliens. When Ouji plays solo, however, his guitar string breaks. To his surprise, he finds all 3 of his former bandmates at the stage, and they play until they defeat the aliens' enemies. Later, Layla reveals that she is beginning to feel the power of human music.
10	"Ten Years Ago" (Japanese: 幻の10年)	Kazunari Kume	Hiroshi Ōnogi	September 16, 1999
Black Heaven, and by extension the ultimate weapon, is not at full power because it is missing its keyboardist Watanabe/Joseph. In an X-Files homage, the 3 stooges Kotoko, Eriko, and Rinko go to America to find Watanabe's grave and investigate an UFO incident, encountering special agents that are doubles for Scully and Mulder pushed into a giant hole created by rival aliens who had stolen Watanabe's corpse. Yoshiko reveals how Watanabe really died, not in a romantic mysterious highway assassination during a visit to America, but in a freak incident when he innocently raised his lobster-injured middle finger at a thug. The band finds an abandoned office space to practice, but find that they still need a keyboard for a key portion of their signature song; Layla offers to fill in as the new keyboardist.
11	"Sweet Emotion" (Japanese: やりたい気持ち)	Takayuki Shimizu	Naruhisa Arakawa	September 23, 1999
The rival aliens are perfecting their own final weapon using a clone of Watanabe's corpse. Although Layla has mastered the technical aspects of the keyboard, she has trouble integrating into the band and cannot follow their playing. Yoshiko steps up her opposition to the band and attacks both Ouji and Layla separately. Kotoko, Eriko, and Rinko try to "train" Layla by putting her through various futile physical regimens without any tangible results. Ouji gives tips to Layla, telling her playing music is like falling in love and that one needs to take the final plunge on instinct and excitement. Layla takes his advice and is able to play with the band for the first time on the next rival aliens' attack. However, although the band plays well, Hamill discovers that the rival aliens are using Watanabe's clone to cancel out Black Heaven's music.
12	"Into the Arena" (Japanese: イントゥー・ジ・アリーナ)	Takashi Kobayashi; Katsuhito Akiyama	Hiroshi Ōnogi	September 30, 1999
The rival aliens test their ultimate weapon "Biomechanical Android Watanabe", which has 6 arms and can play 3 keyboards simultaneously, and almost destroy the aliens, canceling out Black Heaven. Fomalhaut reveals that if rival aliens succeed in their attack, they will destroy Earth also. Ouji tries to explain the truth to Yoshiko over dinner and drinks at his regular street vendor hangout, but Yoshiko does not believe him; however, she eventually gives him her blessings to "have fun" with the band, albeit with a lot of anger and resentment. Only Gen believes innocently that his father is fighting for "space peace." All members of Black Heaven take leave from their jobs to play on the spaceship, on an awesome new stage they christen "Zappa." The rival aliens arrive to have the ultimate fight. Fomalhaut asks Layla if she loves Ouji.
13	"The End" (Japanese: ジ・エンド)	Kazunari Kume	Naruhisa Arakawa	October 7, 1999
The final battle begins, and Black Heaven plays a marathon session in their struggle against the Watanabe clone. Satou collapses from exhaustion. Meanwhile, Yoshiko and Gen leave the house, Yoshiko having filled out an application for divorce. Hamill informs the band and Layla that the fight is over because the enemy has amplified their power by 10,000-fold. Ouji tries to contact Yoshiko to bring 100,000 people through the model home portal to increase their power, but only the answering machine picks up. The aliens and Black Heaven realize they cannot defeat the enemy, even after Yoshiko (in her rock groupie outfit) arrive with fans to boost their performance. Layla encourages Ouji to play anyway, and he plays his new song, which has an unexpected destructive effect on Watanabe, defeating the rival aliens in a final blow. Layla parts with Ouji by kissing him. The episode ends with Ouji apparently returning to his old family life, and Gen having caught on to the next show "The Flying Rangers". Ouji drops his coins at the bus stop on the way to work, and someone who looks like Layla comes by to flip him a 10 yen coin that Ouji uses as a guitar pick.

== Themes ==
=== Opening ===
"Cautionary Warning" by John Sykes

=== Ending ===
Episodes 1–12: "Yappari Onna no Hoga Iiya (I Like To Be A Woman After All)" by Riyu Konaka
Episode 13: "Let Me Go, Let You Go" by Koichi Korenaga

== Production ==
The opening theme "Cautionary Warning" was written and performed by English rock guitarist John Sykes, who played with rock bands including Thin Lizzy and Whitesnake.

=== Media ===
In the US, the series has been available on DVD from Geneon in four separate volumes since 2000, and in a 4-disc box set since 2005. It was released on Blu-ray from Discotek Media on January 26, 2021.
