= Signing Time! =

- Genre: Children's television series
- Created by: Rachel Coleman; Emilie Brown
- Directed by: Damian Dayton
- Starring: Rachel Coleman; Liam Coleman; Alex Brown; Aaron de Azevedo
- Voices of: Clara Poulsen; Alex Brown; Zachary Brown
- Theme music composer: Rachel Coleman
- Opening theme: Signing Time! Theme
- Composers: Rachel Coleman; Lex de Azevedo
- Country of origin: United States
- Original languages: English; ASL (vocabulary only)
- No. of seasons: 2
- No. of episodes: 26 (list of episodes)

Production
- Production location: Salt Lake City, Utah
- Running time: 28–30 minutes
- Production company: Two Little Hands Productions

Original release
- Network: Direct-to-video (episodes 1–9); Syndication
- Release: May 1, 2002 – July 1, 2008

Related
- Baby Signing Time! Practice Time!

Signing Time! is an American television program targeted towards children aged one through eight that teaches American Sign Language. It is filmed in the United States and was created by sisters Emilie Brown and Rachel Coleman, the latter of whom hosts the series. Between 2006 and 2016, it was syndicated by American Public Television to public television stations across the US. Signing Time! is produced and distributed by Two Little Hands Productions, which is located in Salt Lake City, Utah.

Signing Time!'s multi-sensory approach encourages learning through three senses — visual, auditory and kinesthetic — and reaches children with diverse learning styles and abilities by encouraging interaction through signing, singing, speaking and dancing. The series teaches signs for common words, questions, phrases, movements, colors, sports, days of the week, everyday objects, and common activities.

From 2009 to 2012, Signing Time! interstitial music videos aired on the Nick Jr. channel. As of October 4, 2010, public television stations were allowed to show the series for the next two years.

== History and conception ==
In 1996, Rachel Coleman had a child, Liam, who was discovered at 14 months old to have been deaf since birth. Subsequently, they learned sign language, first with Signing Exact English (SEE), then with American Sign Language (ASL), so that they could learn to communicate. Coleman noticed that within six months, Liam's sign language vocabulary surpassed the vocabulary of hearing children their same age.

The Two Little Hands Productions logo

Coleman and her sister Emilie created a visual video for hearing children's learn ASL, and started Two Little Hands Productions, their production company. A foundation, Signing Time Foundation, also exists to teach ASL.

== Format ==
=== Signing Time! ===
Coleman hosts the show, with her child Liam and nephew Alex also starring to provide support. In My First Signs, it was not originally planned for her to be in the videos, but she was added to demonstrate the signs because Alex and Liam could not consistently sign clearly enough to teach viewers the signs.

The second season introduced a new format that includes new signs and more original music. Each program addresses a single theme, marked by a theme song, which is introduced verse by verse. In addition, new segments “ABC Time,” “Counting Time,” “Game Time,” “Story Time,” and “Hopping/Moving Time” explore the episode theme or other skills in a playful way.

Signing Time! Sentences is a three episode mini-series released in 2015 and 2016 geared toward older children and teens. In it Alex and Liam, both now in their late teens, return with Rachel to teach viewers the basics of American Sign Language grammar.

=== Baby Signing Time! ===
Baby Signing Time! is a sister series to Signing Time! It started in 2005 and is geared towards children aged 2 and younger; it is similar to the early volumes of Signing Time where the signs are introduced one at a time. It is much more musical than regular Signing Time and teaches basic ASL signs for a baby's needs and environment. Coleman hosts this series as well, though it features Alex and Liam as animated babies rather than their live-action counterparts.

== Signing Time on public television ==
The Signing Time Foundation funded the airing of Signing Time on public television stations around the country from 2006 to 2008. Signing Time began airing on public television stations nationwide in 2006 and went from being relatively unknown to having over 80% national cumulative carriage. It was the only show on national television teaching children to sign. Public television does not pay for programming, and in order to keep Signing Time on public television, the Signing Time Foundation was expected to produce and deliver 13 episodes annually, which would have totaled an annual cost of approximately 1.5 million dollarsUS, something that Signing Time's production company could not afford.

As of October 4, 2010, public television stations were given the right to air Signing Time! for the next two years.

== Cast ==
- Rachel Coleman, the host of the Signing Time! series. She has spent much of her adult life in the entertainment industry. While performing with her band We the Living, Rachel's 14-month-old child was diagnosed as having a profound hearing impairment.
- Liam Coleman, one of the main children in the show. Liam is the inspiration behind the creation of Signing Time! Diagnosed as profoundly deaf at 14 months old, Liam is now 29. In fourth grade, they garnered national attention for winning first place in their school spelling bee. Liam received a cochlear implant in January 2004.
- Alex Brown, one of the main children in the show. Brown appeared in the first episode of Signing Time! before his third birthday. He learned to sign as a baby so that he could communicate with his deaf cousin. A native of Salt Lake City, Utah, Alex has also lived in Virginia and California.
- Aaron de Azevedo as Hopkins, a cartoon frog. Originally named "Twerp" (a play on the nickname "Terp," for interpreter). Hopkins appears as a little green animated sidekick frog in segments demonstrating words taught in the show. He is named after Thomas Hopkins Gallaudet, who in 1817 established the first free American school for the deaf and hearing-impaired.

== Media ==
=== Television ===
Season / Series	Episodes	Originally aired	
Season / Series	Episodes	First aired	Last aired
1	13	May 1, 2002	March 26, 2006
2	13	August 31, 2007	July 1, 2008
Baby Signing Time!	4	2005	2008
Practice Time!	2	April 26, 2006	June 23, 2006

=== Home media ===
- Baby Signing Time! – 4 volumes
- Practice Time – 2 volumes – Level 1: ABCs and Level 1: 123s
- Story Time Volume 1
- Sing and Sign: Favorite Songs from Volumes 1–6
- Potty Time: A potty training video sold as a set with an audio CD. A "Potty Time" watch with a "potty reminder" alarm is also available as part of a different set.
- Signing Time Christmas: 2 DVD and 1-CD set published in 2014. Brings back Alex and Liam as teenagers.

Other items include printed materials such as board books and flash cards, Signing Time! clothing, and Signing Time! music CDs.

== Awards and nominations ==
Awards and nominations for Signing Time!
Year	Award	Category	Nominee	Result / Refs
2004	Association for Library Service to Children (ALSC)	Notable Children's Videos	Signing Time Series One, Volume 3: Everyday Signs	Won (Note: The ALSC has a list of Notable Children's Videos, so more than one video can be listed.)
2007	Parents' Choice Award	DVD	Signing Time! Practice Time ABCs	Approved (Note: This video won an Approved seal on the Parents' Choice Award among the six types of awards: Classic, Gold, Silver, Recommended, Approved, and "Fun Stuff")
2008	35th Daytime Emmy Awards	Outstanding Performer in a Children's Series	Rachel Coleman, Signing Time!	Nominated

== See also ==
- Sign language in infants and toddlers
- American Sign Language
