= Nephi Anderson =

American novelist

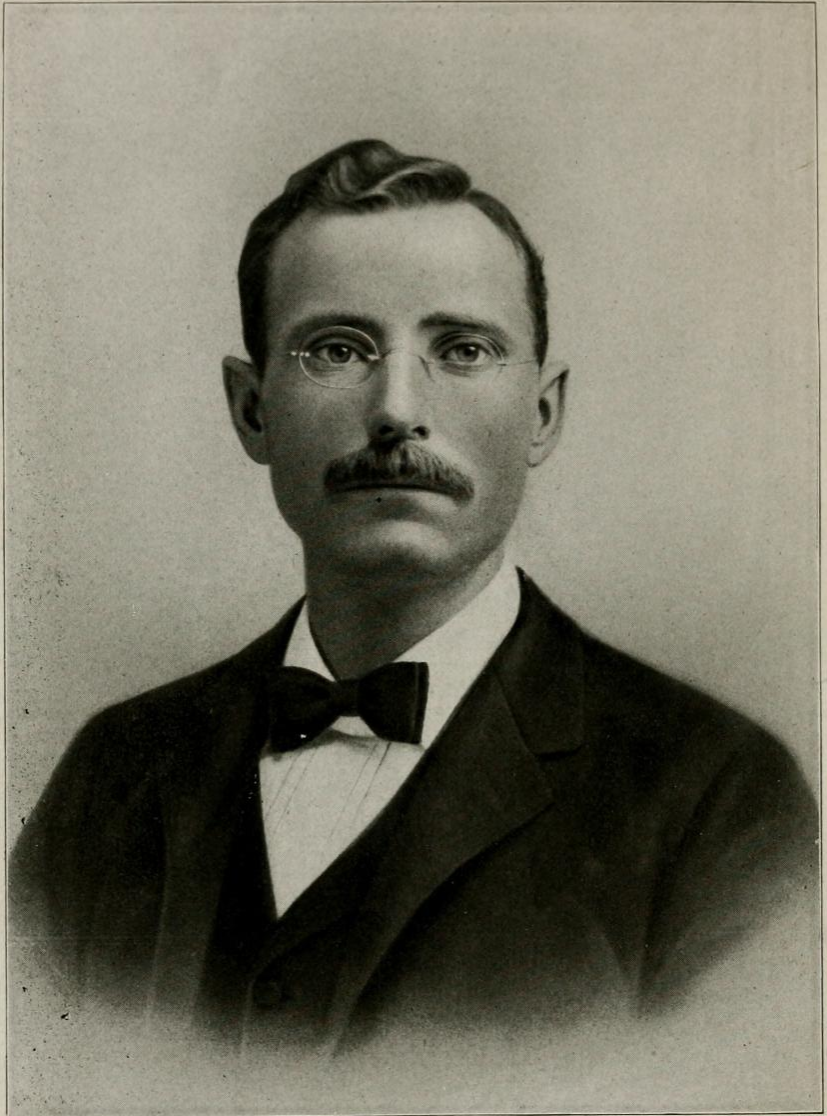
- Anderson in 1902
- Born: January 22, 1865; Christiania, Norway
- Died: January 6, 1923 (aged 57); Salt Lake City, Utah, United States
- Occupations: Educator; author; genealogist
- Writing career
- Period: 1889–1923
- Notable works: Added Upon, Dorian
- Movements: LDS fiction, Home Literature

Christian Nephi Anderson (January 22, 1865 – January 6, 1923) was a prominent Utah novelist and member of the Church of Jesus Christ of Latter-day Saints (LDS Church). A prolific writer of the "Home Literature" period of LDS fiction, Anderson published ten novels including the bestselling Added Upon (1898), as well as short stories, poetry, essays, and a history of the Church for young people.

== Family and church life ==
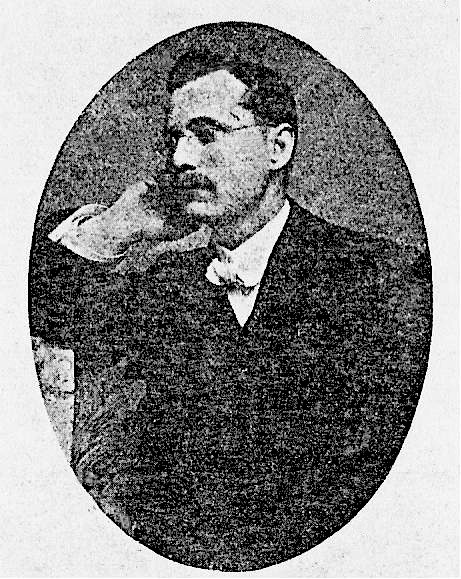
Photo of Anderson from the LDS Biographical Encyclopedia

Anderson was born in Christiania (modern Oslo), Norway on 22 January 1865. His parents, Christian and Petronella Nielson, had joined the LDS Church only a few years before his birth and in 1871 they emigrated to Utah Territory, United States. They settled first in Coalsville and later in Ogden.

In 1886, Anderson married Asenath Tillotson and began a teaching career in Ogden and Brigham City. From 1891 to 1893, he served a mission for the LDS Church in his birth country of Norway and resumed teaching upon returning. He served as Superintendent of Schools in Box Elder County, Utah, from 1900 to 1903. Asenath died in January 1904, having borne six children with Nephi (three of which survived to adulthood).

Just two months after his wife's death, Anderson left on his second mission for the church, this time to Great Britain, where under the direction of Heber J. Grant he became assistant editor of the LDS periodical Millennial Star. Returning to Utah in 1906, Anderson moved his family to Salt Lake City and secured a position as instructor of English and Missionary Studies at Latter-day Saints High School. In 1908, he married Maud Rebecca Symons, with whom he would have six more children.

After a short mission which involved his whole family moving to Independence, Missouri, and an assignment there as editor of another LDS periodical, The Liahona, Anderson was asked to come back to Utah and begin working as an editor and librarian with the Genealogical Society of Utah, replacing Joseph Fielding Smith, who had been called to the church's general leadership. In January, 1923, Anderson developed appendicitis and died on January 6 after an operation for the malady when he developed peritonitis. Speakers at his funeral included Heber J. Grant (LDS Church president, with whom Anderson had always remained close), George Albert Smith, Joseph Fielding Smith, John A. Widtsoe, Anthony W. Ivins, Rudger Clawson, and several other prominent LDS leaders of the period.

== Literary career ==
In a piece in The Improvement Era entitled "A Plea for Fiction" (1898), Anderson wrote of the Mormon experience—"What a field is here for the pen of the novelist." Although he is well known for his particular style of early LDS fiction, his first published book was the non-fiction title, A Young Folks' History of the Church of Jesus Christ of Latter-day Saints (1889). In the early 1890s, Anderson began submitting short works to The Contributor.

He published his most recognized work, the novel Added Upon, in 1898, to wide acclaim and popularity. At his death, a local newspaper exclaimed that Added Upon had "been read by almost every person in [Utah]." During the last three decades of his life, Anderson would write ten novels and numerous short stories, all involving LDS characters and storyline.

=== Publications ===
==== Novels ====
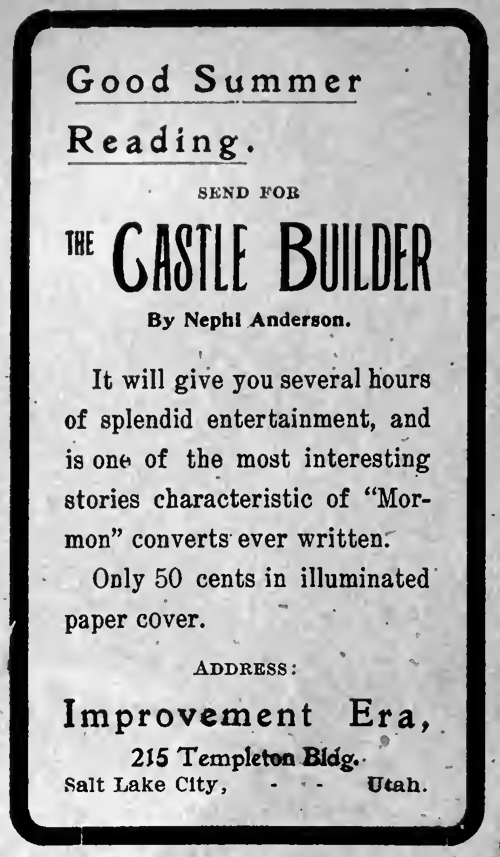
Ad for The Castle Builder from the Improvement Era

- Added Upon (1898)
  - The first and most popular novel written by Anderson. Originally published in 1898 by Deseret News Publishing Company and significantly enlarged and expanded in its fifth edition (1912), the book has never been out of print (its copyright expired in 2005, at which time it began to be re-printed by numerous online publishers). The story concerns several spirit children of God who move from the pre-existence, to mortal life, to their eternal reward, interacting with each other at each step. The novel influenced many subsequent Mormon works of literature, notably Saturday's Warrior.
- Marcus King, Mormon (1900)
- The Castle Builder - serialized in the Improvement Era 1901-1902 and published as a novel in 1909.
- Piney Ridge Cottage (1912)
- Story of Chester Lawrence (1913)
- A Daughter of the North (1915)
- John St. John (1917)
- Romance of a Missionary serialized in the Improvement Era 1907-1908 published as a novel in 1919
- The Boys of Springtown (1920)
- Dorian (1921)
  - A critical edition with scholarly notes, commentary, and analysis edited by Eric W. Jepson was published by Peculiar Pages in 2015 (ISBN 9780991189229). It received the Special Award for Scholarly Publishing and was a finalist for the Criticism Award at the 2016 Association for Mormon Letters conference.

==== Novellas ====
- Almina published serially in The Contributor from November 1891 through May 1892 (Note: Chapters 1-2 (November 1891), 3-4 (December 1891), 5 (January 1892), 6 (February 1892), 7 (March 1892), 8-9 (April 1892), and 10-11 (May 1892).)
- Beyond Arsareth published serially in Relief Society Magazine" from October 1919 through July 1920 (Note: Chapters 1 (October 1919), 2-3 (part 1) (November 1919), 3 (part 2) (December 1919), 4 (part 1) (January 1920), 4 (part 2) (February 1920), 5 (March 1920), 6 (part 1) (April 1920), 6 (part2) (May 1920), 8 (June 1920), and 9 (July 1920).)

==== Non-fiction ====
- A Young Folks' History of the Church (1889)
- "A Plea for Fiction" January 1889 Improvement Era
- "Pride" September 1889 The Contributor
- "Wisdom of God-Agency of Man" August 1890 The Contributor
- "Beyond the Arctic Circle" (1895) published serially in The Contributor November 1894-May 1895 (Note: Chapters 1-2 (November 1894), 3-5 (December 1894), 6-7 (January 1895), 8-9 (February 1895), 10-11 (March 1895), 12-13 (April 1895), and 14 (May 1895).)
- "Seven Sermons" August 1896 The Contributor
- "Current Comment" September 1896 The Contributor
- "Purpose in Fiction" February 1898 Improvement Era
- "Seeing the Midnight Sun" July 1898 Improvement Era
- "From Faith to Faith" March 1899 Improvement Era
- "Life and Character Sketch of Lorenzo Snow June 1899 Improvement Era
- "The Returned Elder" November 1899 Improvement Era
- "The Pilgrims: The Pioneers" July 1900 Improvement Era
- "Are We Americans?" October 1900 Improvement Era
- "Nannie Tout in London" September 1904 Young Woman's Journal
- "The Leavening of the Lump" March 30, 1905 Millennial Star
- "A Day in June" June 1905 Improvement Era
- "Evidences of Immortality" November 30, 1905 Millennial Star
- "The Sword Without; Yet Peace Within" June 21, 1906 Millennial Star
- "That They Might Have Joy" July 5, 1906 Millennial Star
- "The Pictures on the Wall" October 9, 1909
- "The Spirit of Christmas" December 25, 1909 Liahona
- "The Best Tract" February 19, 1910 Liahona
- "Giving and Getting" February 17, 1910 Millennial Star
- "The Personality and Omnipresence of God" March 5, 1910 Liahona
- "What is a Saint?" March 19, 1910 Liahona
- "Modern Testimonies to a Falling Away October 18, 1910 Liahona
- "Sunny Days in Ireland" November 1910 Improvement Era
- "A Gospel Outline" A Scrapbook of Mormon Literature, Vol. 1 (1911)
- "The Importance of Genealogy Among the Latter-day Saints" January 3, 1911 Liahona
- "How to Obey the Gospel" January 3, 1911 Liahona
- "Malerstuen" May 1911 Improvement Era
- "A Day With Carry Nation" September 1911 Improvement Era
- "Show Us the Father" November 5, 1912 Liahona
- "The Place of Genealogy in the Plan of Salvation" April 9, 1912 Liahona
- "Twelve Reasons for not Drinking Whiskey" May 21, 1912 Liahona
- "Unity of the Faith" January 7, 1913 Liahona
- "Spirit and Element" February 18, 1913 Liahona
- "Educational Value of the Missionary System of the Latter-day Saints July 1913 Improvement Era
- "Give the Saints a Chance" August 19, 1913 Liahona
- "'Follow-up Work' in the Mutuals" August 1913 Improvement Era
- "The 'Larger Hope' for the Dead" December 18, 1913 Millennial Star
- "The Test of Efficiency" August 1919 Improvement Era

==== Short stories ====
- "Lester Amsden's Love" January 1890 The Contributor
- "Grandmother's Rocking Chair" May 1890 The Contributor
- "Mary, A Story of Sagebrush Bench" part 1 and part 2 November–December 1890 The Contributor
- "The Finding of the Pearl" January 1894 The Contributor
- "Tallie, Bill White's Girl" March 1894 The Contributor
- "Conscience from Carthage" July 1894 The Contributor
- "On the Border-land of Light" September 1, 1894 The Juvenile Instructor
- "Cat-tail Farm" (1894) (part 1 and part 2) December 1 and 15 1894 The Juvenile Instructor
- "For the Salvation of Souls" (part 1 and part 2) March and April 1900 Improvement Era
- "Finding of Olga: A Pioneer Story" (part 1 and part 2) February and March 1901 Improvement Era
- Fisherman Knute's Christmas Gift (1903) (ch. 1-2 and ch. 3) November–December 1903 Improvement Era
- "The Letter from Mary" December 1904 Improvement Era
- "By This Shall All Men Know" January 26, 1905 Millennial Star (Excerpt from The Castle Builder)
- "What Shall We Do?" June 22, 1905 Millennial Star
- "Because I Love You" July 12, 1906 Millennial Star
- "The Lewellen Family's Christmas Present" December 14, 1905 Millennial Star
- "Freedom of Donald Gray" April 1906 Improvement Era
- "Because I Love You" August 10, 1907 Liahona (Reprint of 1906 story)
- "The Inevitable" August 1907 Improvement Era
- "The Heart's Eternal Tenderness August 1907 Young Woman's Journal
- "When the Stove Smoked" September 1907 Improvement Era
- "Tales of a Sunday School Board 'The Word of Wisdom'" October 1, 1907 The Juvenile Instructor
- "Tales of a Sunday School Board 'An Andersen Tale'" October 15, 1907 The Juvenile Instructor
- "Tales of a Sunday School Board 'Nelda Wilson's Debut'" November 1, 1907 The Juvenile Instructor
- "How the Lord Was Good to Aunt Johanna" December 1909 Improvement Era
- "The Lonesome Christmas" December 25, 1909 Liahona
- "The End of the Rainbow" June 1910 Improvement Era
- "A Little Child Shall Lead Them" October 1910 Improvement Era
- "Out of the Abundance of the Heart" February 1910 Improvement Era
- "The Home Guard" March 1911 Improvement Era
- "John Engleman and the Spirit of Christmas' (part 1 and part 2) December 1911– January 1912 of Improvement Era
- "The Home Field" January 1915 Improvement Era
- "The Silent Protest" (part 1 and part 2) April–May 1916 "The Juvenile Instructor"
- "Unbidden Guests" May 1915 Improvement Era - winner of the February Improvement Era Prize
- "Double Tragedy" June 1915 Young Woman's Journal
- "The 'Selfishness' of Jacob and Rachel" September 1915 Relief Society Magazine
- "Mother's Day" July 1916 Relief Society Magazine
- "Testing of Gilda" June 1916 Improvement Era
- "The Barefoot Boy" October 1916 The Juvenile Instructor
- "How the Spirit of Christmas Came" December 1916 The Juvenile Instructor
- "At St. Peter's Gate" November 1917 Improvement Era
- "Tendrilla" (part 1 and part 2) September and October 1917 Improvement Era
- "The Essential" February 1918 Relief Society Magazine
- "Forfeits" April 1918 Improvement Era
- "The Welding Link" May 1918 Relief Society Magazine
- "Gold Mines and Riches" July 1918
- "Mother's Christmas Story December 1918 Relief Society Magazine
- "The Ridge Between" February 1919 The Juvenile Instructor
- "The Girl" October 1921 Improvement Era
- "Distance Lends Enchantment" October 1922 Improvement Era
- "The Straw" October 1922 Improvement Era
- "Exceptions" January 1923 Improvement Era
- "The Dimmed Vision" (unknown date) Deseret Book

==== Poetry ====
- "The Visit of the King" December 1895 The Contributor
- "Consolation" December 1900 Improvement Era
- "A Vision" April 1901 Improvement Era
- "Died in the Field" February 1901 Improvement Era (republished in the January 15, 1910 Liahona)
- "Love's First Conquest" September 1904 Improvement Era
- "The Home Call" October 1906 Improvement Era
- "True Riches" February 1912 Improvement Era
