= Ivins, Utah =

City in Utah, United States

- City
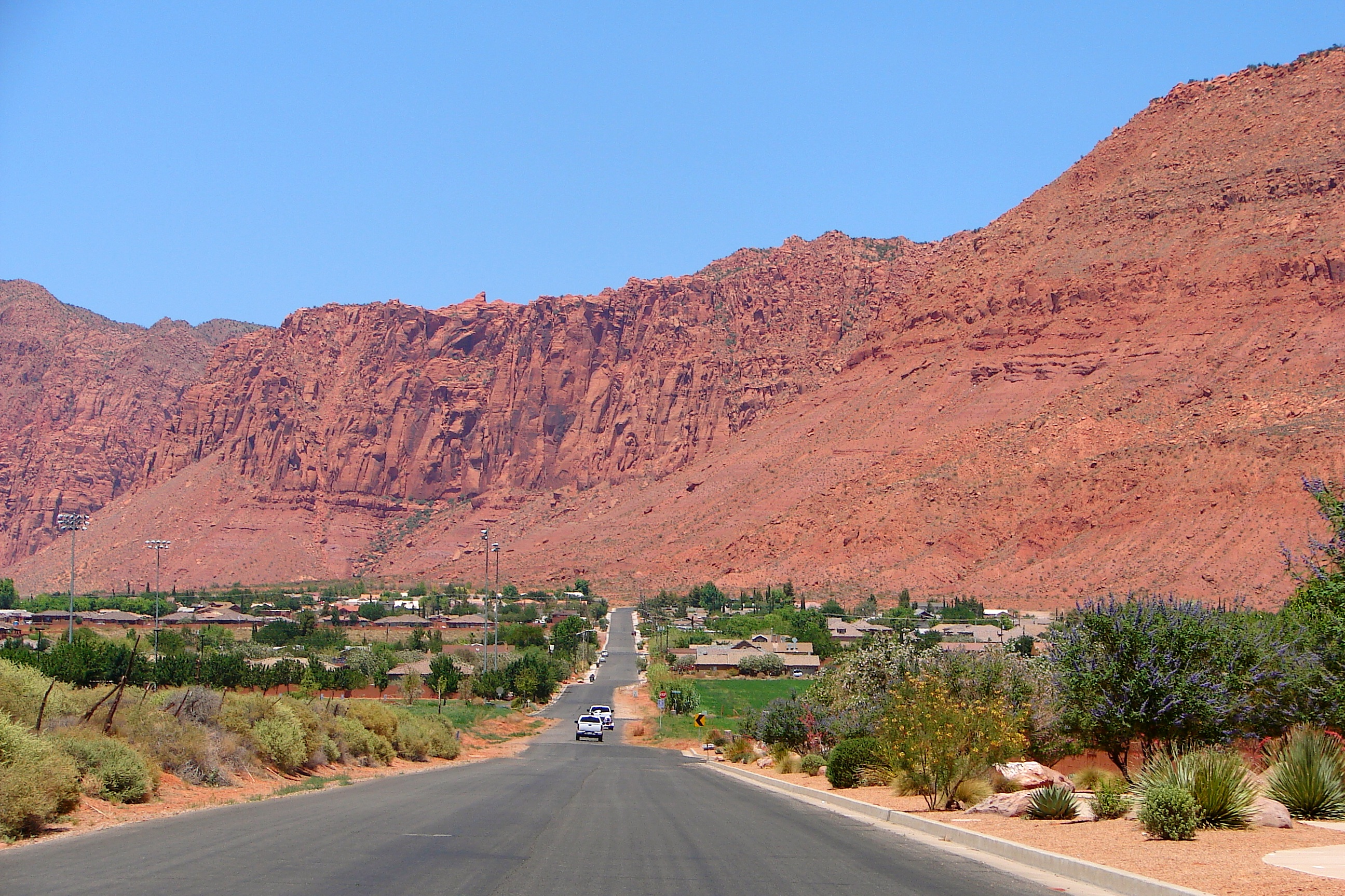
- Looking north along South 200 West in Ivins, May 2013

- Location in Washington County and the state of Utah
- Coordinates: 37°10′27″N 113°40′51″W
- Country: United States
- State: Utah
- County: Washington
- Incorporated: 1935
- Became a city: January 1, 1998
- Named for: Anthony W. Ivins

Area
  - Total: 9.48 sq mi (24.56 km^{2})
  - Land: 9.43 sq mi (24.43 km^{2})
  - Water: 0.050 sq mi (0.13 km^{2})
- Elevation: 3,156 ft (962 m)

Population (2020)
  - Total: 8,978
  - Density: 1,016/sq mi (392.3/km^{2})
- Time zone: UTC-7 (Mountain (MST))
  - Summer (DST): UTC-6 (MDT)
- ZIP code: 84738
- Area code: 435
- FIPS code: 49-38710
- GNIS feature ID: 2410125
- Website: ivinsutah.gov

Ivins (/ˈaɪvɪnz/ EYE-vinz) is a city in southwestern Washington County, Utah, United States. It is a part of the St. George Metropolitan Area as a suburb or "bedroom" community. The population was 8,978 at the 2020 census, up from 6,753 at the 2010 census. Although Ivins was listed as a town in the 2000 census, it became a city in 1998.

== Geography ==
According to the United States Census Bureau, the city has a total area of 10.3 square miles (27 km^{2}), of which 10.2 mi^{2} (26 km^{2}) is land and 0.1 mi^{2} (0.26 km^{2}) (0.68%) is water.

Ivins is home to Tuacahn (an outdoor arts and amphitheater) and near Snow Canyon State Park, which draw many people to the area. There are many new planned developments (some with golf courses) near or in Ivins, joining the earlier Kayenta and Padre Canyon developments.

=== Climate ===
According to the Köppen Climate Classification system, Ivins has a semi-arid climate, abbreviated "BSk" on climate maps.

== Demographics ==
Historical population
Census	Pop.	Note	%±
1940	83		—
1950	95		14.5%
1960	77		−18.9%
1970	137		77.9%
1980	600		338.0%
1990	1,630		171.7%
2000	4,450		173.0%
2010	6,753		51.8%
2020	8,978		32.9%

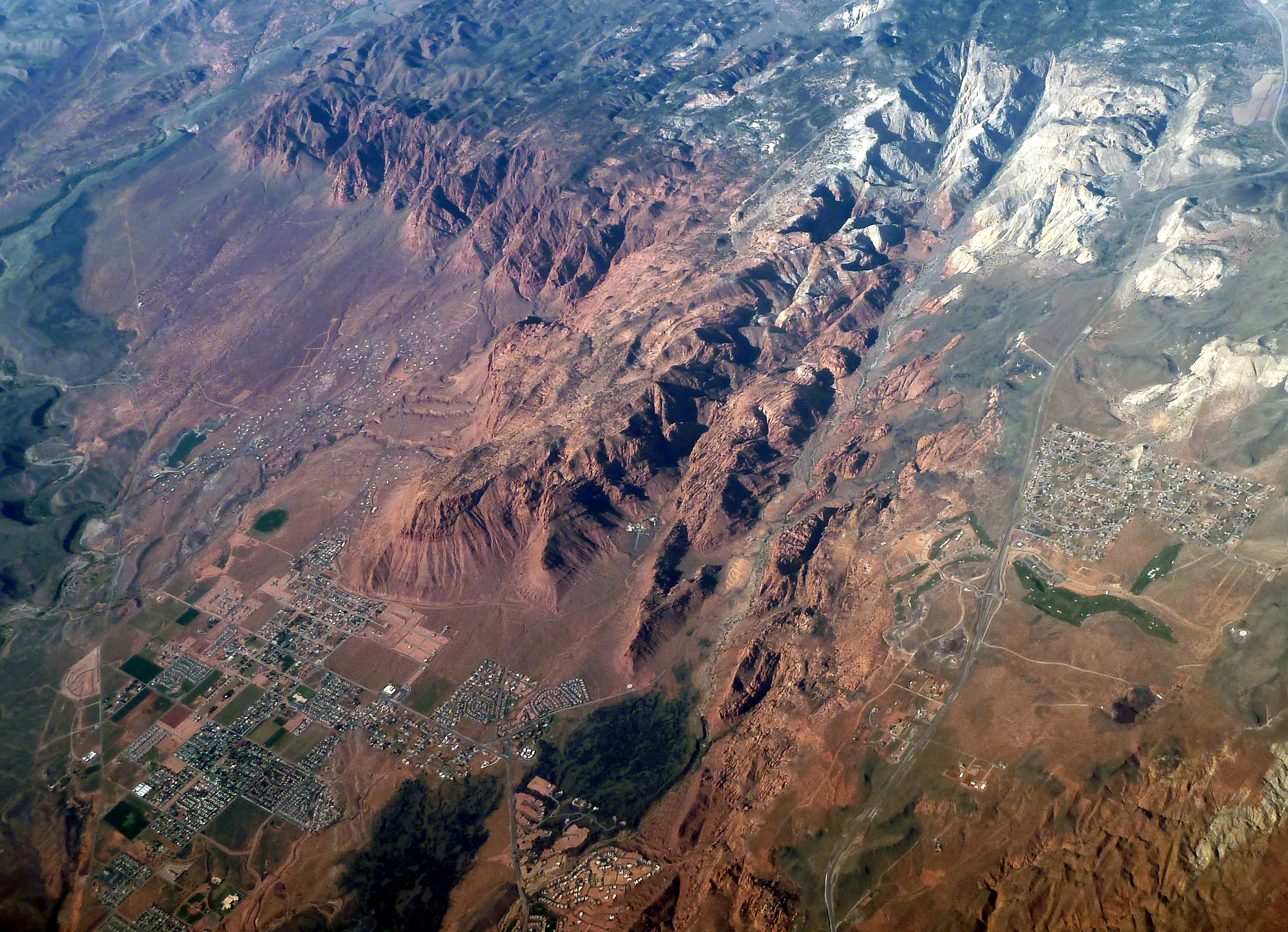
Aerial view of Ivins

=== 2020 census ===
As of the 2020 census, Ivins had a population of 8,978. The median age was 48.6 years; 21.0% of residents were under the age of 18 and 31.6% of residents were 65 years of age or older. For every 100 females there were 99.3 males, and for every 100 females age 18 and over there were 96.3 males age 18 and over.

96.4% of residents lived in urban areas, while 3.6% lived in rural areas.

There were 3,389 households in Ivins, of which 25.0% had children under the age of 18 living in them. Of all households, 68.3% were married-couple households, 9.8% were households with a male householder and no spouse or partner present, and 18.8% were households with a female householder and no spouse or partner present. About 17.8% of all households were made up of individuals and 11.0% had someone living alone who was 65 years of age or older.

There were 3,992 housing units, of which 15.1% were vacant. The homeowner vacancy rate was 0.9% and the rental vacancy rate was 12.9%.

Racial composition as of the 2020 census
Race	Number	Percent
White	7,966	88.7%
Black or African American	29	0.3%
American Indian and Alaska Native	59	0.7%
Asian	80	0.9%
Native Hawaiian and Other Pacific Islander	62	0.7%
Some other race	295	3.3%
Two or more races	487	5.4%
Hispanic or Latino (of any race)	754	8.4%

=== 2000 census ===
As of the census of 2000, there were 4,450 people, 1,435 households, and 1,234 families residing in the town. The population density was 436.3 people per square mile (168.4/km^{2}). There were 1,598 housing units at an average density of 156.7 per square mile (60.5/km^{2}). The racial makeup of the town was 93.96% White, 0.07% African American, 1.19% Native American, 0.34% Asian, 0.34% Pacific Islander, 2.04% from other races, and 2.07% from two or more races. Hispanic or Latino of any race were 3.93% of the population.

There were 1,435 households, out of which 43.8% had children under the age of 18 living with them, 76.0% were married couples living together, 7.6% had a female householder with no husband present, and 14.0% were non-families. 11.0% of all households were made up of individuals, and 4.6% had someone living alone who was 65 years of age or older. The average household size was 3.10 and the average family size was 3.35.

In the town the population was spread out, with 33.1% under the age of 18, 9.0% from 18 to 24, 25.5% from 25 to 44, 20.1% from 45 to 64, and 12.3% who were 65 years of age or older. The median age was 30 years. For every 100 females, there were 98.7 males. For every 100 females age 18 and over, there were 95.9 males.

The median income for a household in the town was $41,297, and the median income for a family was $43,103. Males had a median income of $30,868 versus $21,719 for females. The per capita income for the town was $16,743. About 4.9% of families and 6.8% of the population were below the poverty line, including 9.8% of those under age 18 and 3.4% of those age 65 or over.

== Arts and culture ==
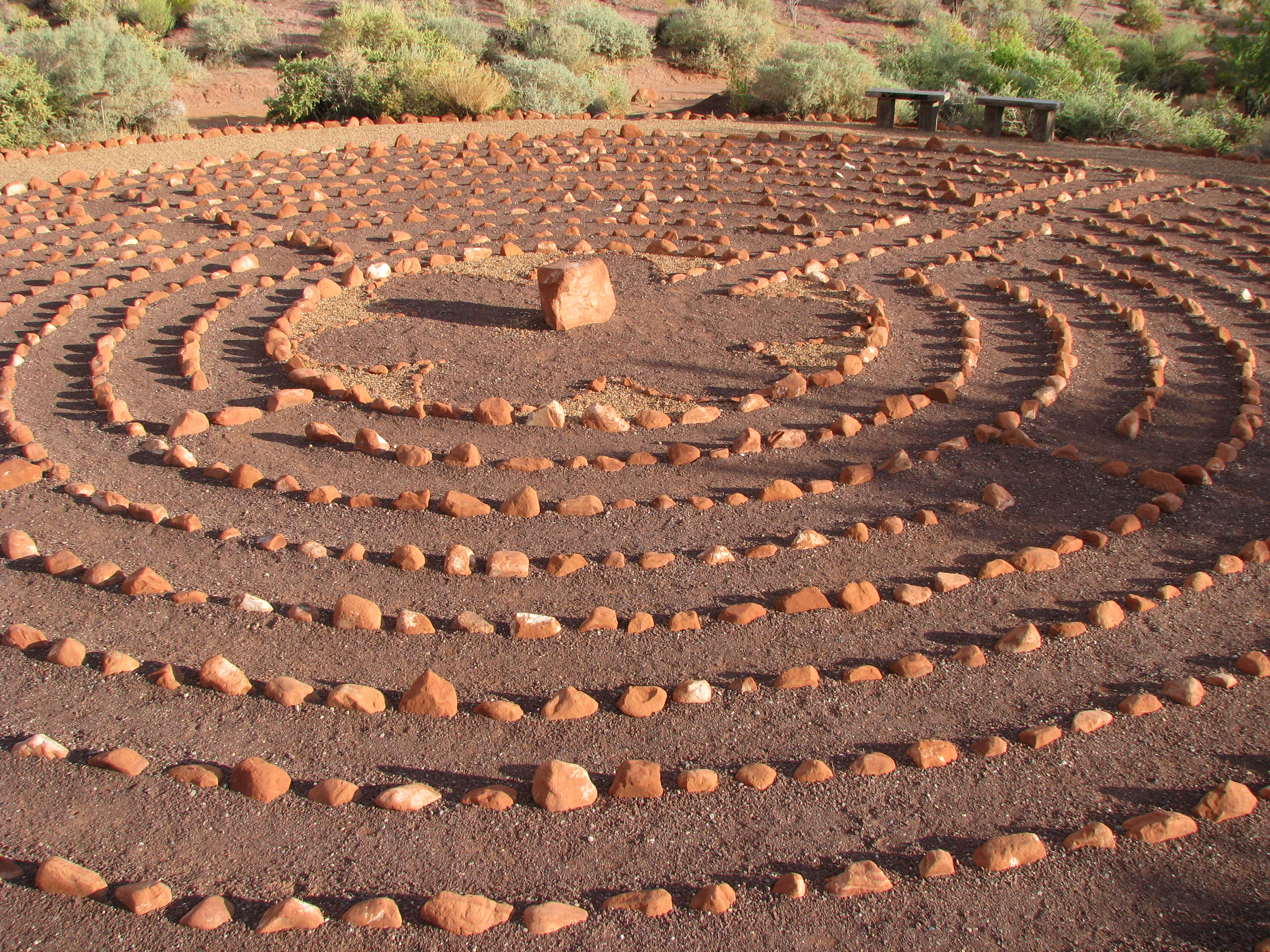
Desert Rose Labyrinth in Kayenta

Kayenta Art Village, located in the Kayenta Desert Community, features art galleries, a theater, and a Desert Rose Labyrinth made from small stones.

The Tuacahn Center for the Arts in Ivins is the largest professional outdoor theater in Utah, employing between 100 and 250 people. It features a 1,920-seat outdoor amphitheater, and an indoor theater.

Fire Lake Park at Ivins Reservoir opened in 2018, and features a beach and swim area.

Resorts in Ivins include Red Mountain Resort, Movara Resort, Sentierre Resort, and Black Desert Resort. The PGA Tour's Bank of Utah Championship has been held at the Black Desert Resort since 2024.

== Education ==
Public education is administered by the Washington County School District. Red Mountain Elementary School is located in Ivins.

Rocky Vista University College of Osteopathic Medicine is located in Ivins.

== See also ==
- Snow Canyon State Park - a nearby state park
- Tuacahn High School for the Arts - a former school in Ivins
