= Rachel Coleman =

American producer, singer, songwriter and actress

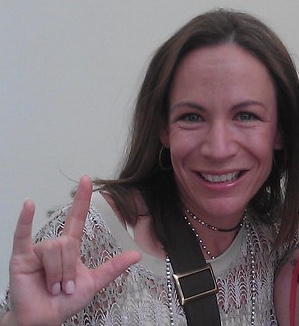
- Coleman in 2012
- Born: Rachel de Azevedo; Van Nuys, California, U.S.
- Occupations: Producer, singer, songwriter, actress
- Years active: 2001–present
- Television: Signing Time!, Rachel & The Treeschoolers
- Spouse: Aaron Coleman
- Children: 3
- Parent: Lex de Azevedo (father)
- Family: Emilie Brown (sister)

Rachel Coleman is an American producer, singer, songwriter, and actress. With her sister Emilie de Azevedo Brown, she created the Signing Time! video series to teach children basic American Sign Language (ASL), which was broadcast on public television. She produces, directs, and stars in the series, and handles much of its operations as co-founder of Two Little Hands Productions.

== Biography ==
Rachel de Azevedo was born in Van Nuys, California, to Lex and Linda de Azevedo as the fifth of nine children. Coleman and her father won a Pearl Award in 2007 for songs they had done for children.

As Rachel de Azevedo she has been credited in several episodes of Touched by an Angel. Before moving out of the Los Angeles area, she performed with the band We the Living and appeared in the made-for-TV movie Spring Fling.

In 1998, Coleman and her husband Aaron discovered that their 14-month-old child was deaf. She began learning sign language. In 2001, together with her sister, she created Signing Time!, a children's video series that teaches basic ASL to children of all abilities. In 2008, she was nominated for the "Outstanding Performer in a Children's Series," for the 35th Annual Daytime Entertainment Emmys. Her work with Signing Time! led her to create the Signing Time Foundation for the promotion of accessible communication for all children.

In 2013, she began a campaign to crowd-fund a new children's series, Rachel & the TreeSchoolers, after it was turned down by networks for being too educational for television. As of April 2016, nine episodes in this series have been released.

In 2018, Coleman became the executive director of the American Society for Deaf Children. And, her executive director for ASDC has ended in 2021.

Rachel Coleman released her first children’s album Oh, Rainbow! on December 21, 2024.

== Filmography ==
- Signing Time! Series 1 (13 volumes)
- Signing Time! Series 2 (13 volumes)
- Baby Signing Time (4 volumes)
- Practice Time! (2 volumes)
- Potty Time! (1 volume)
- Rachel & the TreeSchoolers (9 volumes)
- Signing Time Christmas Collection (1 volume)
- Signing Time Sentences (3 volumes)
- Signing Time Nursery Rhymes (1 volume)
- Sign It! American Sign Language Made Easy (20 lessons)
- Louder Than Words
- Saturday's Warrior (2016 version) – producer
