= Douglass Stewart =

American dramatist

Douglass Stewart is a Latter-day Saint playwright most notable for having written Saturday's Warrior. He also wrote the screenplay used in the 1974 film version of Where the Red Fern Grows. He was the moving creative force behind the creation of Tuacahn.
