= Utah Arts Academy =

Coordinates: 37.12659°N 113.60197°W

Location
- 1091 N. Bluff St #801; St George, Utah; United States

Information
- Type: Charter, five-year, arts specialty
- Established: 2021; 5 years ago (1999; 27 years ago as Tuacahn High School for the Arts)
- Authorizer: Utah State Charter School Board
- Principal: Drew Williams
- Staff: 36
- Grades: 8-12
- Enrollment: 272 (2023-2024)
- Student to teacher ratio: 14.27 (2023-2024)
- Color: White/blue
- Website: www.utahartsacademy.org

Utah Arts Academy (formerly Tuacahn High School for the Arts) is a public charter high school in the state of Utah, United States. It is located in St George, just outside Ivins. The school offers a full college preparatory curriculum, while focusing in-depth on the various areas of the performing arts.

== History ==
Tuacahn High School for the Arts was founded as Tuacahn High School for the Performing Arts in 1999 as Utah's first charter high school. While first created as a music and dance conservatory, in association with Tuacahn Center for the Arts, Kevin Smith worked to create a high school for performing arts. In 2019 it was announced that the school would change its name, dropping "performing", to reflect expanded offerings of visual arts, technical theatre, film, and audio production.

THSA closed its doors permanently on May 30, 2021, and transferred the charter to Utah Arts Academy, which is currently located in St. George, Utah.

== Academics ==
Class offerings include five possible years of mathematics credits and an honors alternative; five years of English credits and corresponding honors courses; a three 1/2 credit hour history curriculum; five possible science credits; and a variety of technology, health, and social science courses to accompany the arts.
