= Emilie Brown =

American actress

- Born: Emilie de Azevedo
- Other names: Emily Brown, Marie Downing, Mary Cobb
- Occupations: Voice actress, producer, director
- Years active: 1984–present
- Television: Signing Time!
- Spouse: Derek Brown
- Children: 4
- Parent: Lex de Azevedo (father)
- Family: Rachel Coleman (sister)

Emilie de Azevedo Brown is an American voice actress, producer, and director. Before moving out of the Los Angeles area, she did several anime voice roles mostly under the names Emily Brown, Mary Cobb and Marie Downing. One of her earliest voice acting roles was Annie Labelle in the 1980s crossover anime hit Robotech when she was 13 years old. After graduating from Brigham Young University in 1996 with a theatre degree, she continued her career in the entertainment industry.

In 1996, her sister Rachel Coleman discovered that her child was deaf. Brown teamed up with Coleman to create Signing Time! - an entertaining children's public television and video series that teaches basic American Sign Language (ASL) to children of all abilities. She serves as the director and producer. Over 26 Signing Time! episodes have been made, as well as Baby Signing Time, Practice Time and all other Two Little Hands Productions.

== Personal life ==
She is married to Derek Brown. They have four kids. She is a member of the Republican Party in Salt Lake City County. Her father Lex is a prominent Latter-day Saint musician.

== Filmography ==
=== Anime voice roles ===
List of voice performances in anime
Year	Title	Role	Notes	Source
1985	Robotech series	Annie Labelle, others	Credited as Mary Cobb	
1999	Saber Marionette J Again	Lorelei		
1999	Outlaw Star	Melfina	Credited as Emily Brown	
1999	Cowboy Bebop	Stella	Ep. 8	
1999	El Hazard: The Alternative World	Qawool Towles		
1999	Serial Experiments Lain	Alice Mizuki		
1999	Battle Athletes Victory	Jessie Gurtlant	As Marie Downing	
2000–02	Fushigi Yûgi series	Hotohori (Young), others		
2000	Trigun	Rem Saverem (singing voice), Michelle, others		
2000	The Legend of Black Heaven	Kotoko		
2000	Sol Bianca: The Legacy	Flor		
2001	Mobile Suit Gundam: The 08th MS Team	Aina Sahalin	Also Miller's Report	
2001	Ah! My Goddess The Movie	Ex		
2001	Akira	Female Newscaster 1, Female Nurse	Pioneer dub	
2001	Gate Keepers	Yasue Okamori, others		
2001	Saint Tail	Eri		
2002	Adventures of Mini-Goddess	Various characters		

=== Other voice roles ===
List of voice performances in non-anime productions
Year	Title	Role	Notes	Source
	Final Fantasy IX	Village children, creatures		
	Little Lulu	Little Lulu		
	The Swan Princess	Fountain girl		

== Works with Two Little Hands Productions ==
List of crew and production roles
Year	Title	Role	Notes	Source
2006–present	Signing Time!	Producer, director, writer		
	Baby Signing Time	Executive producer, creator		
	Rachel & the TreeSchoolers	Executive producer, director, various characters		
