= Orval Hafen =

American politician

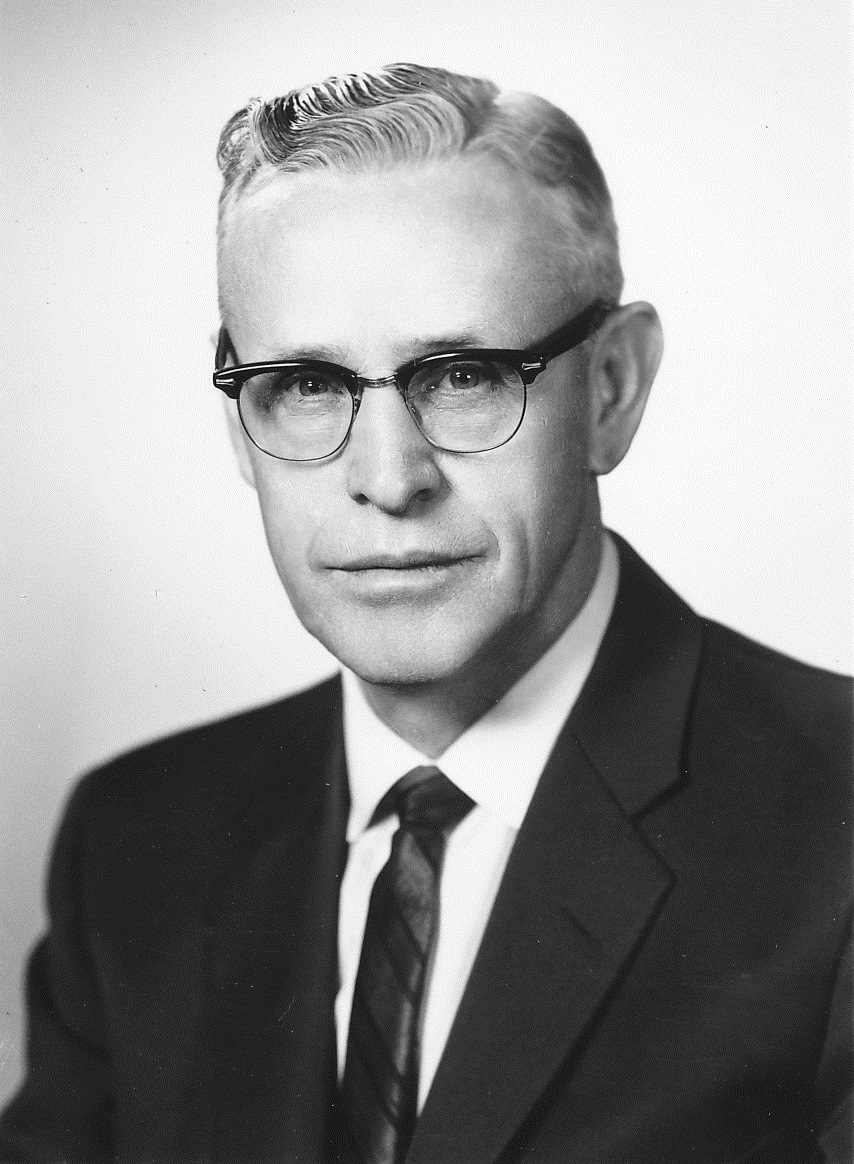
- Hafen in 1960

Member of the Utah Senate

Personal details
- Born: November 16, 1903
- Died: October 3, 1964 (aged 60)
- Party: Republican
- Spouse: Ruth Clark Hafen (m. 1932)
- Children: 6

Orval Hafen (November 16, 1903–October 3, 1964) was a Utah State Senator and president of the Utah Bar Association. He was a key figure in the long process that by the start of the 21st-century had made St. George a key center of retirement and growing community.

Hafen was a native of Santa Clara, Utah. He received an associates degree from Dixie College (now Utah Tech University) and completed his undergraduate studies at Brigham Young University. He then went to work in Washington, D.C. while taking night courses at George Washington University. He then received his law degree from the University of California, Berkeley in 1929. In 1932 he moved back to Washington County, Utah and settled at St. George. He came to practice law and to head the local farmers cooperative at the urging of Dixie College president Joseph A. Nicholes.

In 1933 Hafen was serving as a member of the St. George Stake presidency of The Church of Jesus Christ of Latter-day Saints. He also was the president of the St. George Chamber of Commerce that year. He was involved with operating Dixie College from when The Church of Jesus Christ of Latter-day Saints stopped funding the institution in 1933 until the state of Utah took over operations in 1935. Hafen also served as both St. George city and Washington County attorney. He was also Washington County Chairman for the Republican Party.

The cooperative that Hafen came to run in St. George failed after he was there about a year, and never paid him his promised salary. He then along with other civic boosters was involved in organizing the Pioneer Protection and Investment Company. This group pooled the small amount of capital available in St. George to import fertilizers and sell it to farmers to boost crop output.

In 1934 Hafen married Ruth Clark. She had been born in Panguitch, Utah, but largely raised in Provo, Utah. She and Hafen had met when they were both students at BYU. She had since worked as a teacher in Nephi, Utah. She married Hafen with the understanding that their stay in St. George would be short.

Hafen was involved with five other men in forming the Dixie Education Association in 1935. This group worked to raise money in case Dixie faced a later crisis of funding. Its funds eventually were key in the 1960s in Dixie College moving to a new campus.

Later Hafen established a Ford car dealership and car maintenance garage. He also developed a subdivision in the area of Main Street and 6th South.

In 1943 Hafen served as president of the Utah State Bar Association. He served a total of 12 years as a member of the Utah State Senate, first elected in 1952. When first elected his district covered Washington County Utah and Iron County Utah. In 1955 he was made Republican Party whip in the Senate. He was the president of the state senate starting 1957. In 1953 he worked closely with Ernest L. Wilkinson to draft the legislative bills to provide for the return of Dixie, Weber and Snow College to the Church of Jesus Christ of Latter-day Saints. This move eventually was narrowly defeated when it was put to voters.

As a member of the legislature, Hafen managed to push through budget bills to build new buildings at Dixie College. Hafen supported the compromise that gave the rural Utah counties (including Washington County) which had 25% of the population control of 11 of the 14 state senate seats while the majority of the state house seats were controlled by the urban counties with 75% of the population. Hafen opposed the idea of the majority always controlling in government. He did push through a bill that changed the balance so the state senate districts were split 14 to the rural counties and 13 to the four urban counties of Utah, Salt Lake, Davis and Weber. This balance was later ended after the Supreme Court of the United States ruled to mandate all legislative districts represent the principle of "one man one vote" and regular redistricting to preserve such a balance.

He and his wife Ruth were the parents of five children, including Bruce C. Hafen.

== Sources ==
- Senator Orval Hafen and the Transformation of Utah's Dixie, Douglas D. Alder, ''Utah Historical Quarterly, Vol. 70, no. 1 (2002), p. 75-91.
- Dixie State University bio of Hafen
