= Juncal Formation =

Prominent sedimentary geologic unit of the Eocene age in California

- Stratigraphic range: Eocene
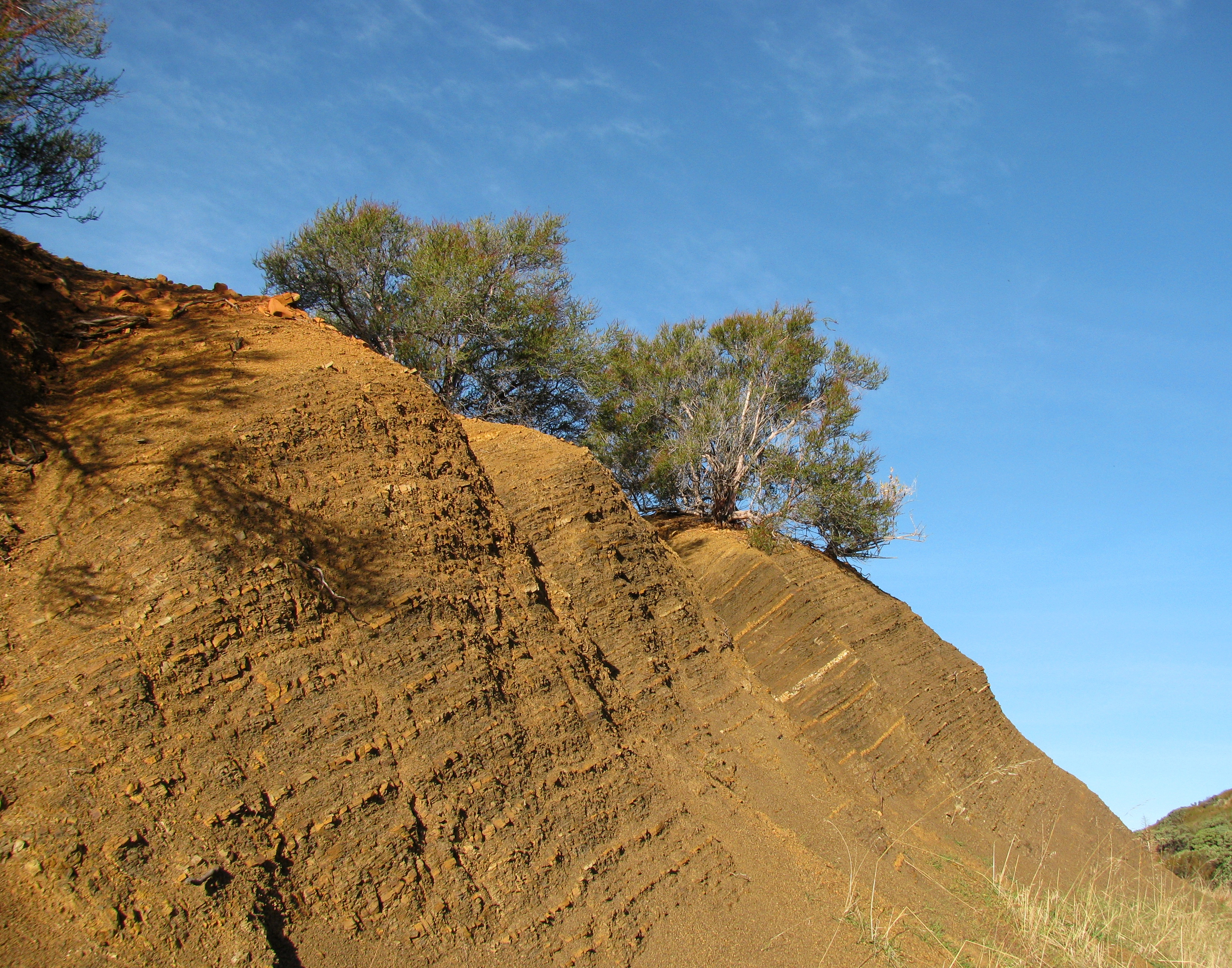
- Outcrop of the Juncal Formation, in the Santa Ynez Mountains, California. Shale with interbeds of sandstone (the lighter-colored material).
- Type: sedimentary
- Underlies: Matilija Sandstone
- Overlies: Sierra Blanca Limestone, Jalama Formation, Espada Formation, Franciscan Formation
- Thickness: 1,500 to 5,400 feet

Lithology
- Primary: shale, sandstone

Location
- Region: Coastal southern California
- Country: United States

Type section
- Named for: Juncal Camp, east of Agua Caliente Creek, Santa Barbara County
- Named by: Page, Marks and Walker (1951)

The Juncal Formation (also Juncal Shale) (/ˈdʒʊŋkɑːl, ˈhuːŋ/) is a prominent sedimentary geologic unit of Eocene age found in and north of the Santa Ynez Mountain range in southern and central Santa Barbara County and central Ventura County, California. An enormously thick series of sediments deposited over millions of years in environments ranging from nearshore to deep water, it makes up much of the crest of the Santa Ynez range north of Montecito, as well as portions of the San Rafael Mountains in the interior of the county. Its softer shales weather to saddles and swales, supporting a dense growth of brush, and its sandstones form prominent outcrops.

== Type locality, description, and distribution ==
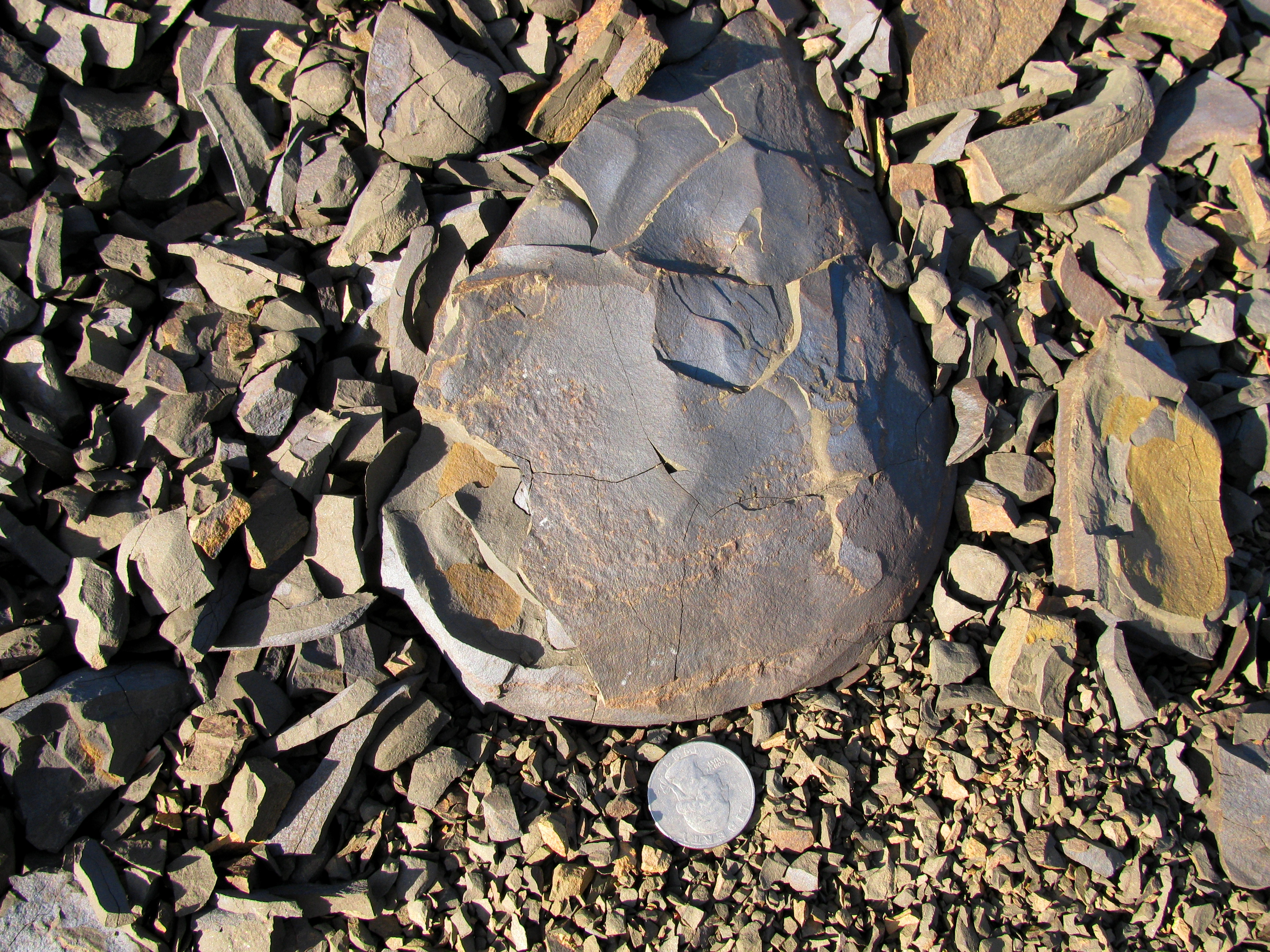
Weathered Juncal Shale. Quarter for scale.

The type locality of the Juncal Formation is found north of the Santa Ynez River and east of Agua Caliente Canyon, near Juncal Campground in the Los Padres National Forest, where the unit is well-exposed. At the type locality the Juncal Formation is 3,360 feet thick, which is about average; elsewhere it is both thicker and thinner, reaching 5,400 feet thick near the Romero Saddle north of Carpinteria, and thinning to 1,500 feet north of the Santa Ynez Fault in Oso and Redrock Canyons.

The unit consists of shales and sandstones, with the shales being generally more abundant, particularly near the top of the stratigraphic column. Overall the unit shows a persistent alternation of shale and sandstone layers, of widely varying thickness, indicating frequent and erratic changes in water depth at the point of deposition. The lithologic characteristics of the unit are different north and south of the Santa Ynez River. South of the river, on the north slope and on the crest of the Santa Ynez Mountains, the shales are darker and a thick interior sandstone member can be mapped as a separate unit. Page, Marks, and Walker, in their 1951 report on the region mapped it as the "Camino Cielo Sandstone member." North of the river, the unit contains fossil oyster beds in a sandstone member at its base, and an interior sandstone member is massive and cliff-forming, unlike anything in the Juncal of the Santa Ynez Mountains.

Shales of the unit are micaceous and dark, usually gray or brown, weathering to various colors. Sandstones are arkosic, hard, and range from white to tan in color. The shale weathers readily, and supports a dense growth of chaparral, similar to the other shale units in the Santa Ynez Mountains, such as the Cozy Dell.

The unit lies conformably on the Sierra Blanca Limestone, a relatively thin, separately-mapped limestone unit, in some areas. Where the Sierra Blanca is not present the unit lies unconformably on older units – including the Jalama Formation and Espada Formations, both of Cretaceous age; and in some places the Juncal lies unconformably on the Franciscan Formation, which is probably of Jurassic age.

== Deposition environment and tectonic history ==
Sometime during the late Cretaceous period, the sea withdrew from the area that was to become the California coast in the region of Santa Barbara and Ventura, exposing the sediments that had accumulated during tens of millions of years underwater – the Espada and Jalama Formations – and they began to erode. In the early Eocene, the sea returned, resuming sediment deposition on the eroded surface, making an unconformity.

The first unit deposited in the Eocene was the limestone Sierra Blanca Formation, although only north of the Santa Ynez Fault, and then the ancient sea deposited the Juncal Formation on top of the Sierra Blanca. At this time, the crustal block on which these units were deposited was nearer to the present-day position of San Diego; it has twisted approximately 90 degrees clockwise during the last 15 million years, as part of a process of regional, extensional deformation associated with motion along the boundary of the Pacific and North American Plates.

At first the sea was shallow, and the first part of the Juncal Formation to be deposited was in a shallow-water environment with reefs. This portion of the unit includes calcareous sandstones and shales and sandstones with lenses of limestone, as well as come conglomerates. Gradually the sea deepened, resulting in the deposition of finer-grained sediments, although mixed in with the shales that resulted are coarser-grained sediments such as sandstones, indicating an alternating regime of deep and shallow water over the millions of years in which the Juncal Formation was laid down. Another peculiarity of the unit is that fossil foraminifers from very different depth environments are often mixed together; this has been interpreted as the result of turbidity currents and other submarine mass movements. Rip-up clasts and conglomerates which appear in the Juncal also support this interpretation. Some of the foraminifers are characteristic of lower bathyal depths, indicating that some of the Juncal formation was deposited at a depth of up to 2,000 meters.

== Paleontology ==
While the formation is rich in microfossils, particularly foraminifers, larger fossils are uncommon. However, some of the stratigraphically lowest beds – such as the portion which is in contact with the Sierra Blanca limestone formation – contain larger fossils characteristic of nearshore and reef environments. These include oysters, especially in limestone-rich beds and limestone lenses. Other fossils from the Juncal include algae, worms, brachiopods and molluscs.

== Economic importance ==
As a potential hydrocarbon resource, the unit is grouped with above-lying sedimentary units as part of the Gaviota-Sacate-Matilija Sandstone Play. While the Juncal Formation itself does not likely contain large pools of oil or gas, it may be a source rock for petroleum found in other units, particularly low-sulfur oil in offshore reservoirs.
