= Jalama Formation =

Sedimentary rock formation in California, United States

- Stratigraphic range: Late Cretaceous
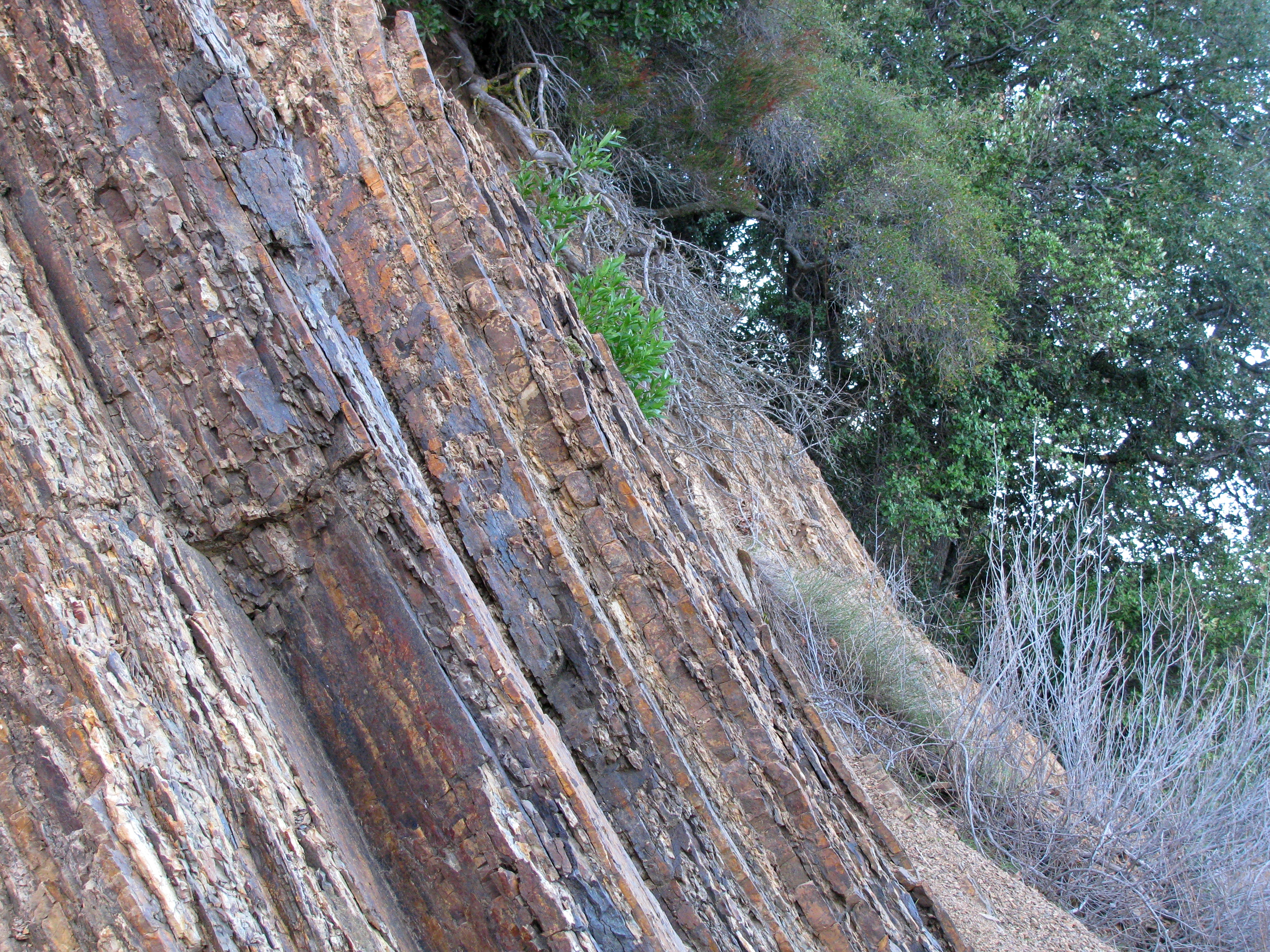
- Dark shale beds of the Jalama Formation on the Santa Ynez Mountain crest north of Montecito, California. These beds are overturned; "up" is down and to the left.
- Type: Sedimentary
- Underlies: Juncal Formation, Sierra Blanca Limestone
- Overlies: Espada Formation, Franciscan Formation
- Thickness: 2000-4000 feet

Lithology
- Primary: Shale, sandstone

Location
- Region: Coastal and interior Santa Barbara County, California
- Country: United States

Type section
- Named for: Jalama Creek
- Named by: Dibblee (1950)

The Jalama Formation is a sedimentary rock formation widespread in southern Santa Barbara County and northern Ventura County, southern California. Of the Late Cretaceous epoch, the unit consists predominantly of clay shale with some beds of sandstone.

A particularly erosion-resistant sandstone within the unit forms the scenic Nojoqui Falls, in the Santa Ynez Mountains south of Solvang.

== Type locality and description ==
The type locality of the Jalama Formation is in southwestern Santa Barbara County on the low ridgeline between Santa Anita and Bulito Canyons, within Hollister Ranch, near the crest of the Santa Ynez Mountains, and near the headwaters of Jalama Creek. The formation is found from this area eastward along the Santa Ynez Range in periodic outcrops, underlying either the Anita Shale (in the western portion of its range) or the Juncal Formation Shale (in the east). The largest outcrop in the Santa Ynez Range is along the north slope of the mountains near Santa Ynez Peak, where it is exposed for approximately six miles. Other outcrops occur north of the Santa Ynez Fault, in the San Rafael Mountains along the Little Pine Syncline and along the Hildreth Fault.

Characteristic shale beds within the Jalama are dark gray to black, micaceous, and often carbonaceous. Sandstones interbedded with the shales are arkosic, light gray to tan, and sometimes massive, as at the base of the type section on Hollister Ranch. Another interbedded unit occasionally encountered is a cobbly conglomerate, which outcrops on the north slope of the Santa Ynez Mountains south of Gibraltar Reservoir. The cobbles in this unit are detritus from a granitic source rock in a gray to brown matrix. The overall Jalama Formation varies in thickness from around 2,000 feet near the Romero Saddle north of Carpinteria, to about 4,000 feet at the type location more than forty miles to the west.

== Deposition environment and geologic history ==
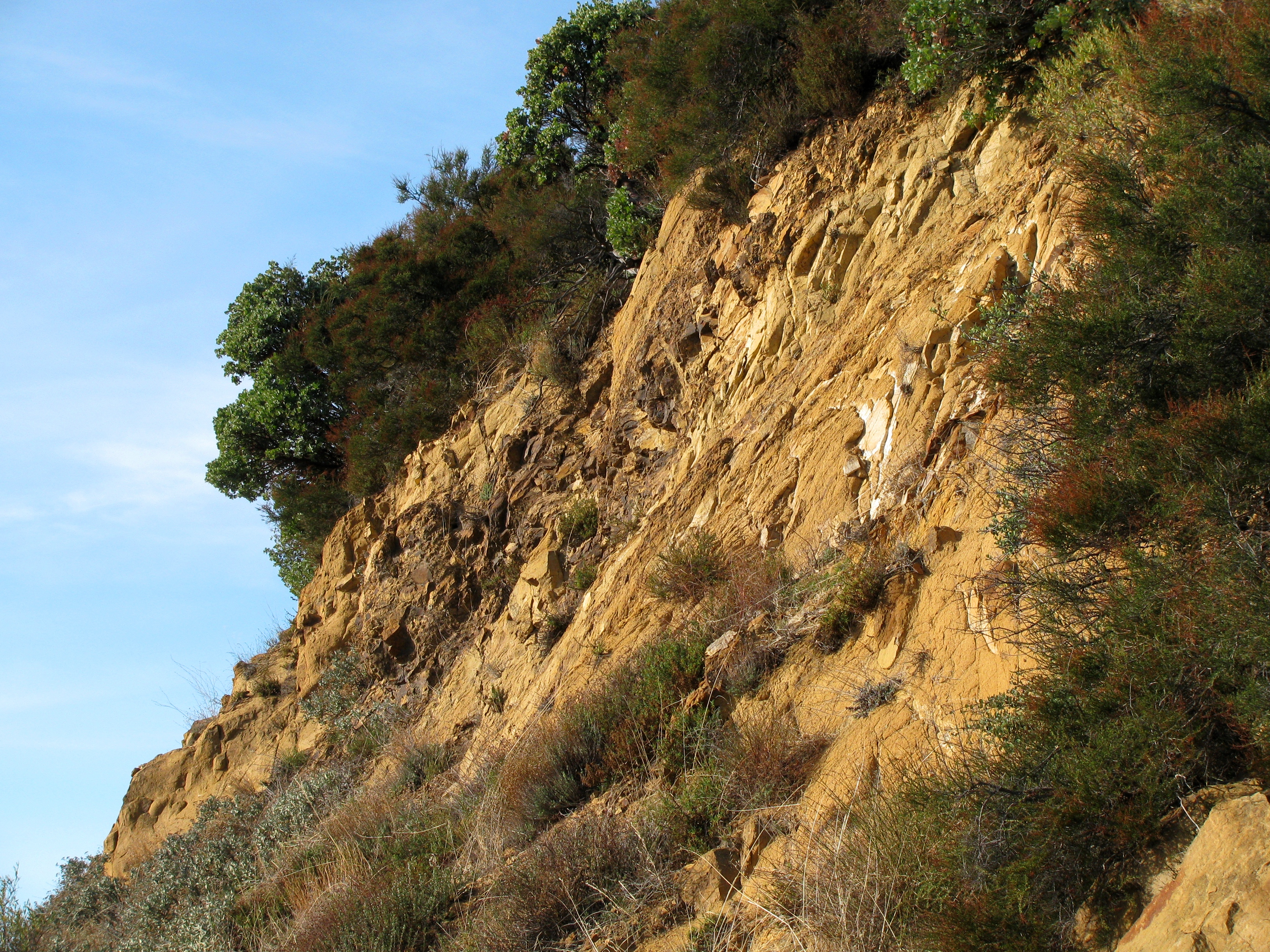
Sandstone unit within the Jalama Formation

The region of present-day Santa Barbara and Ventura County during the Late Cretaceous was submerged, and the depositional environment was one of a narrow shelf and submarine fans. The previously exposed Espada Formation, after a period of erosion, was now underwater, and began to receive layers of sediment which would become the Jalama Formation. Periodic episodes of deeper and shallower water resulted in finer and coarser sediments, respectively – shales versus sandstones. The crustal block on which the Jalama formation was deposited has been inferred to have rotated approximately 90 degrees clockwise and moved northward along the coast from its former position nearer San Diego. This motion took place beginning in the early Miocene, during a period of deformation along the boundaries of the Pacific and North American Plates, a boundary represented today by the San Andreas Fault.

The unit lies unconformably on the Espada Formation, also of Cretaceous age, and in places on the older Franciscan Formation, which is probably of Jurassic age. In one location, in Nojoqui Canyon near the Nojoqui Falls, the Jalama is in conformable contact with the underlying Espada, indicating one area that remained submerged through the era.

The Jalama formation is separated by overlying sedimentary layers by an unconformity most everywhere it has been found, as the Paleocene is unrepresented in the fossil record in southern Santa Barbara County, and the stratigraphic sequence goes directly from the Cretaceous Jalama to Eocene units, including the Anita and Juncal Formations. In his 1966 book on the geology of the central Santa Ynez Mountains, Dibblee finds the Cretaceous Jalama Formation to be in conformable contact with the Eocene Juncal in the eastern part of the Santa Ynez range, without mentioning the intervening Paleocene; in this portion of the unit there are no fossils to provide clues as to date.

== Paleontology ==
While the eastern part of the Jalama Formation is almost without fossils, some localities in the western part are richly fossiliferous, with Campanian age foraminifer and molluscan assemblages.

At least one species – Lysis jalamaca, from an extinct genus of shallow-marine gastropod – has been named for the unit. Lysus jalamaca has been dated to between 70 and 75 million years before present, in the late Cretaceous. Other fossils found in the Jalama Formation, listed in Dibblee's 1950 book include six species of bivalves and one species each of gastropod and cephalopod. All of these are described as "abundant", with numerous others not listed; all are indicative of upper Cretaceous.

== See also ==
- Cretaceous California
- Geologic formations of California
