= Cozy Dell Canyon =

Canyon in Ventura County, California

Coordinates: 34°28′56″N 119°16′0″W

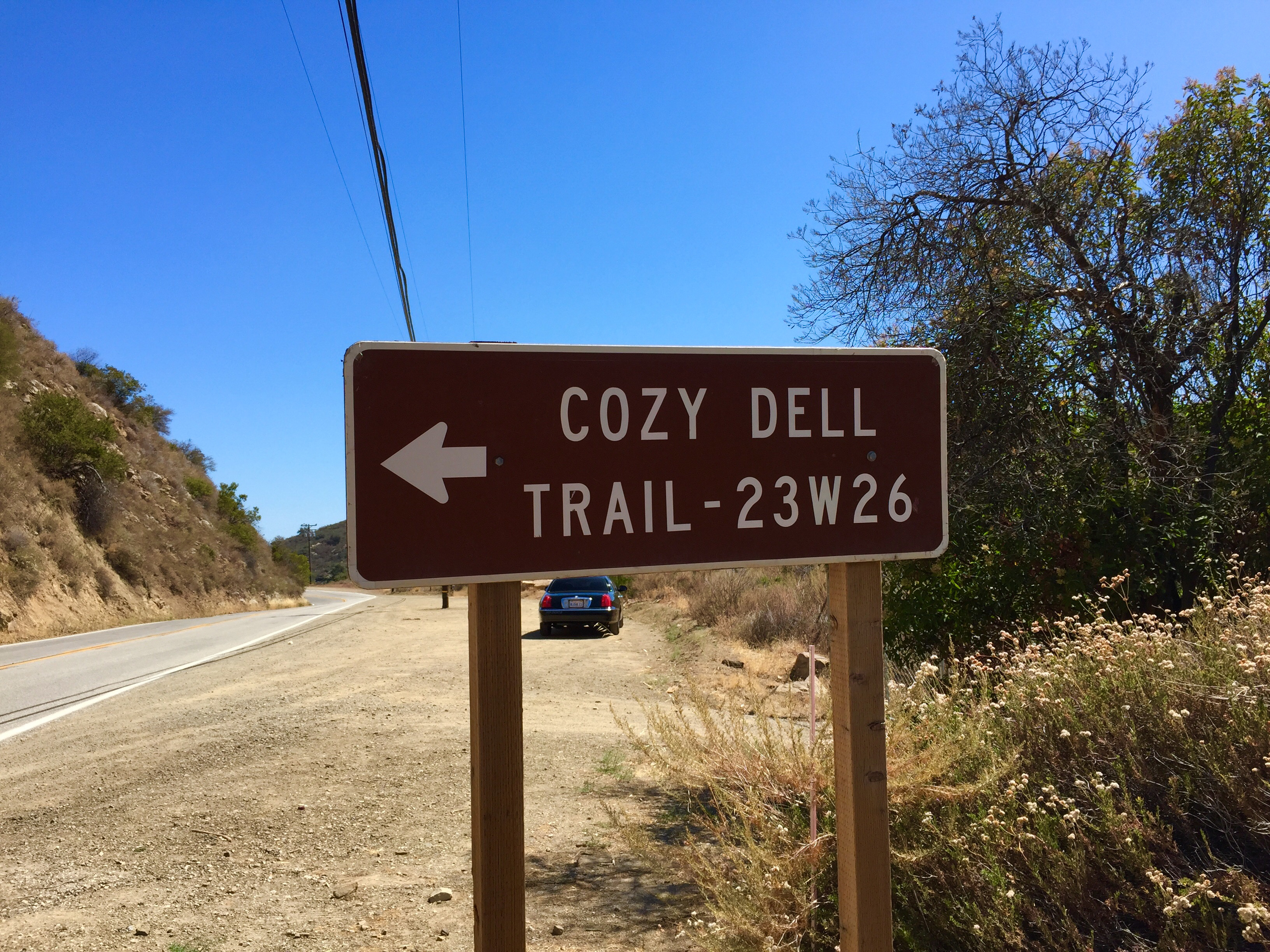
National Forest Trailhead sign for the Cozy Dell Trail

Cozy Dell Canyon is a canyon in the Topatopa Mountains immediately north of Meiners Oaks and three miles northwest of the Ojai Valley in central-western parts of Ventura County, California. It is located between Sheldon Canyon, Kennedy Canyon and McDonald Canyon, immediately east of the Ventura River. It is situated in the Los Padres National Forest and may be reached from numerous trailheads including the Cozy Dell Trail located in Ojala. It is the type locality for the Cozy Dell Shale and the name was first applied in 1928 by Kerr and Schenck. It is recognized for its natural beauty, creeks and creek beds, endemic wildflowers, diverse wildlife, rock formations, as well as panoramic views of surrounding mountains and the entire Ojai Valley.

The canyon is about 5 km (3.1 mi) long and runs in a southwest direction. Its source is at an elevation of approximately 1,250 m (4,100 ft) just below Nordhoff Ridge and west of Nordhous Peak (elevation: 1,367 m (4,485 ft)). The canyon flows into the Ventura River (elevation 247 m (810 ft)) about one mile north of Meiners Oaks. California State Route 33 crosses the canyon just above its juncture with the Ventura.

== Flora and fauna ==
Cozy Dell Canyon is a wildlife corridor within the Los Padres National Forest, home to an abundance of indigenous flora and fauna. Some of the species found here include the mountain lion, bobcat, grey fox, coyote, mule deer, California black bear (Ursus americanus californiensis), raccoon, long-tailed weasel, broad-footed mole, spotted- and striped skunk, jack rabbit, cottontail rabbit, elk, Virginia opossum, California condor, ring-tailed cat, red-tailed hawk, numerous species of snakes, raptors and lizards, in addition to more than 450 other species of animals and fish. Besides the Southern Pacific rattlesnake, there are numerous other venomous animal species, including several species of scorpions, such as the stripe-tailed scorpion (Hoffmannius spinigerus) and giant hairy scorpion. Some of the flora here includes the bush mallow, sticky monkeyflower, purple sage, black sage, morning glory, penstemon, farewell to spring, buckwheat, deer weed, vervain, scarlet pimpernel, maidenhair fern, miner's lettuce, oak, chaparral, bay laurel, lupinus, poison oak, California poppies, cactus, and much more.

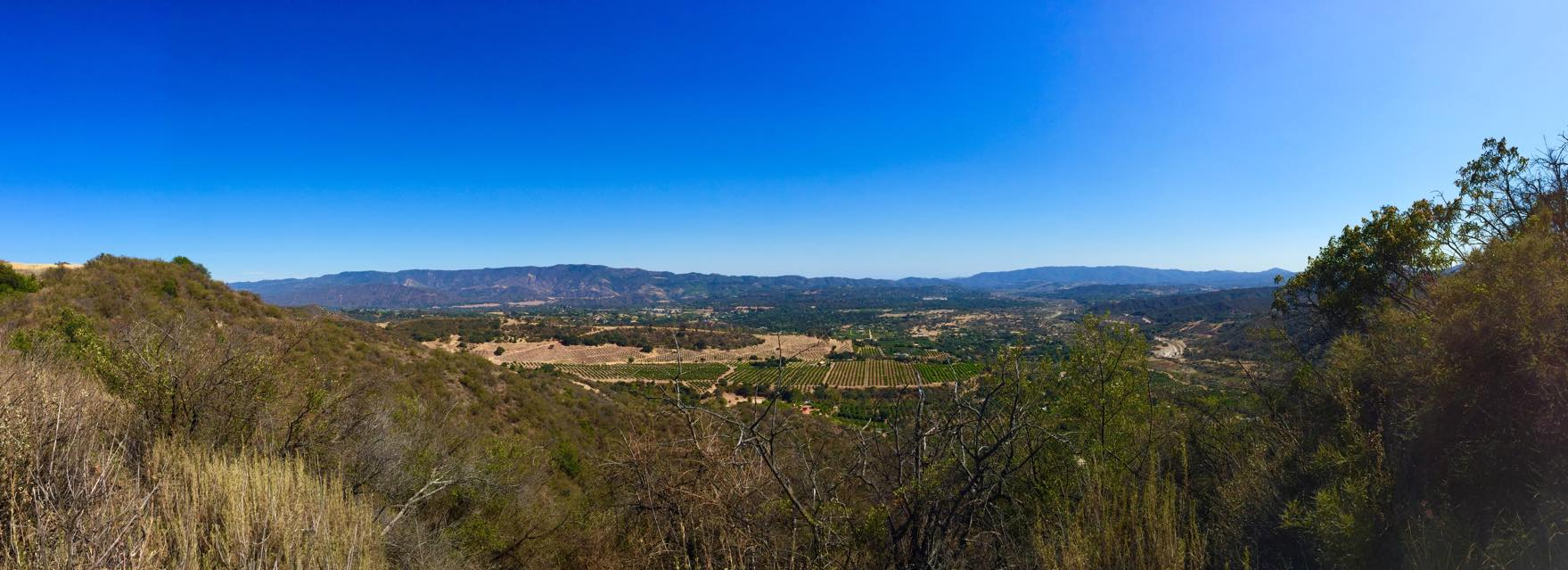
Panoramic view of the Ojai Valley from one of the vista points on Cozy Dell Trail
