= Coldwater Sandstone =

Eocene geologic unit in Southern California

- Stratigraphic range: Mid-Late Eocene
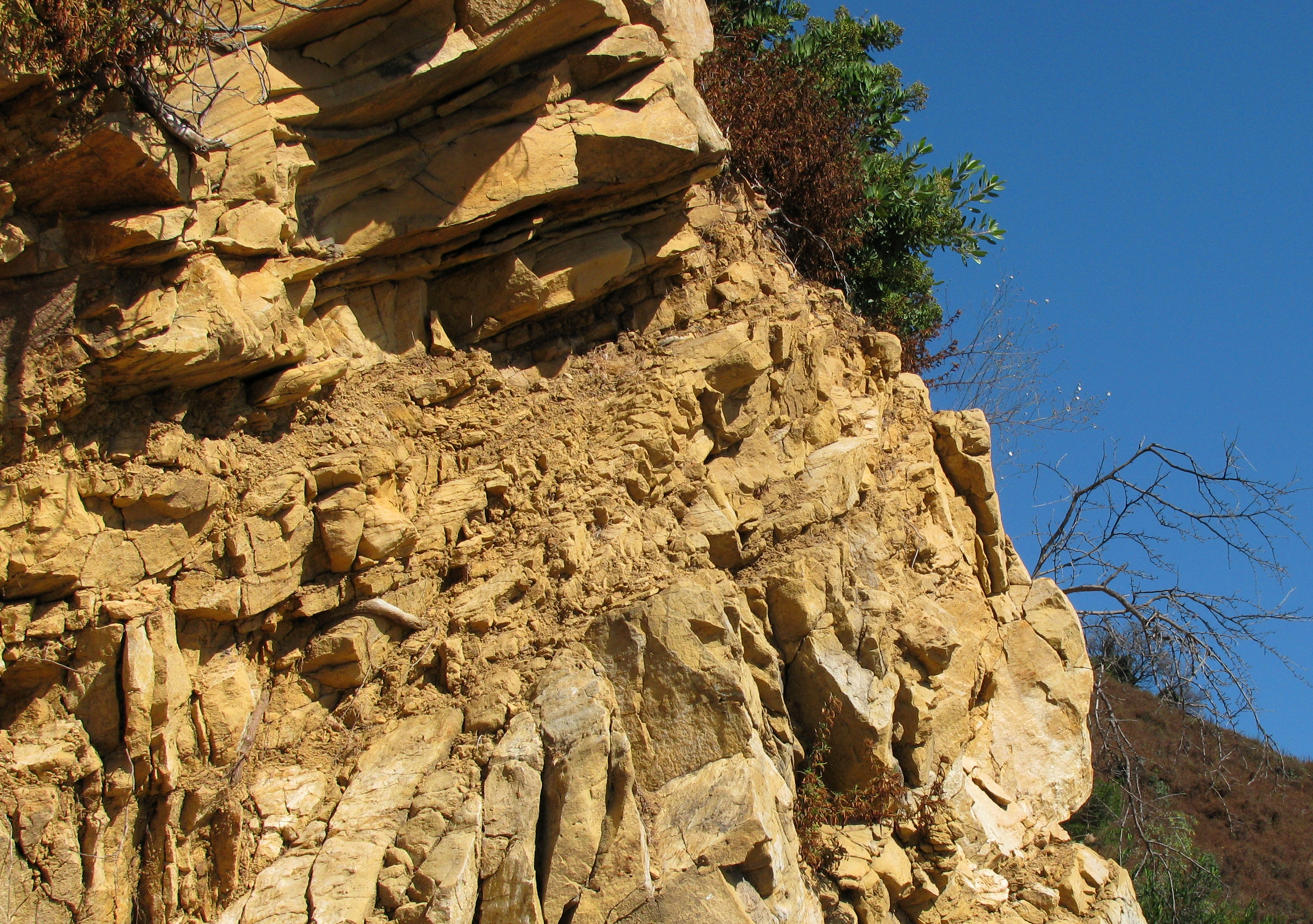
- Coldwater Sandstone, Santa Ynez Mountains, north of Santa Barbara, California
- Type: sedimentary
- Underlies: Sespe Formation
- Overlies: Cozy Dell Shale
- Thickness: 0 to 3200 feet

Lithology
- Primary: sandstone
- Other: siltstone, mudstone, occasional conglomerates

Location
- Region: Southern California
- Country: United States

Type section
- Named for: Coldwater Canyon, tributary of the Sespe River, north of Fillmore
- Named by: Watts(1896)

The Coldwater Sandstone (or Coldwater Formation) is a sedimentary geologic unit of Eocene age found in Southern California, primarily in and south of the Santa Ynez Mountains of Santa Barbara County, and east into Ventura County. It consists primarily of massive arkosic sandstone with some siltstone and shale. Being exceptionally resistant to erosion, outcrops of the Coldwater form some of the most dramatic terrain on the south slope of the Santa Ynez Mountains, with immense white sculpted slabs forming peaks, hogback ridges, and sheer cliff faces.

== Type locality, description, and occurrence ==
The type locality for the Coldwater Sandstone is in Coldwater Canyon, a western branch of the Sespe River a few miles north of Fillmore. The unit is typically around half a mile thick, ranging from 2,500 to 3,200 feet through most of its extent, although it thins westward to around 1,000 feet thick in the hills north of El Capitan State Beach. From there going west to Gaviota, the unit gradually grades into the Sacate Formation, a similar but shalier and more siltstone-rich unit which is also conformably overlain on the Cozy Dell Formation. The Coldwater and Sacate Formations are sometimes considered as a single unit, particularly underneath the Santa Barbara Channel where they appear in drill cores. The Gaviota Formation is deposited conformably on top of the Coldwater-Sacate in the western part of the dual unit's extent, and the Sespe Formation appears conformably on top of it elsewhere.

The Coldwater outcrops predominantly on the south slope of the Santa Ynez Range, and on the crest of the range at San Marcos Pass. Cathedral Peak, the 3,333-foot prominence directly north of Santa Barbara, is within the Coldwater unit. Because the sandstone beds are resistant to erosion, wherever they dip steeply, they form distinctive hogback ridges and dip-slopes, a topography particularly characteristic of the ridge north of Goleta, where the Coldwater accounts for almost all of the terrain above approximately 1,000 feet. While the unit is exposed prominently throughout the Santa Ynez Mountains, it dips steeply to the south and vanishes underneath the coastal plain and then the Santa Barbara Channel. Well bores in the numerous oil and gas fields in the Channel show the Gaviota Formation overlying the Cozy Dell directly, with no intervening Coldwater, excepting the offshore portion of the Capitan Oil Field, in which the Coldwater Formation is present as a natural-gas-bearing unit, underlying the Gaviota.

As a potential hydrocarbon resource, the unit is considered to be equivalent to the Sacate, and is grouped with the lower-lying Cozy Dell Shale and Matilija Sandstone as the Gaviota-Sacate-Matilija Sandstone Play. The likely source rocks for any petroleum accumulation in the Coldwater-Sacate are the lower-lying organic-rich shale units, such as the Cozy Dell and the Juncal-Anita Formations. Since this deep-lying play is incompletely explored, the estimates for hydrocarbon resources are speculative, with the United States Bureau of Ocean Energy Management, Regulation and Enforcement giving a range of 117 to 127 million barrels of oil recoverable using current technology for the entire Santa Barbara-Ventura Basin Province. Some onshore oil fields produce from the Coldwater, including the Ojai Oil Field north of Santa Paula and Sespe oil field north of Fillmore, not far from the type locality for the formation.

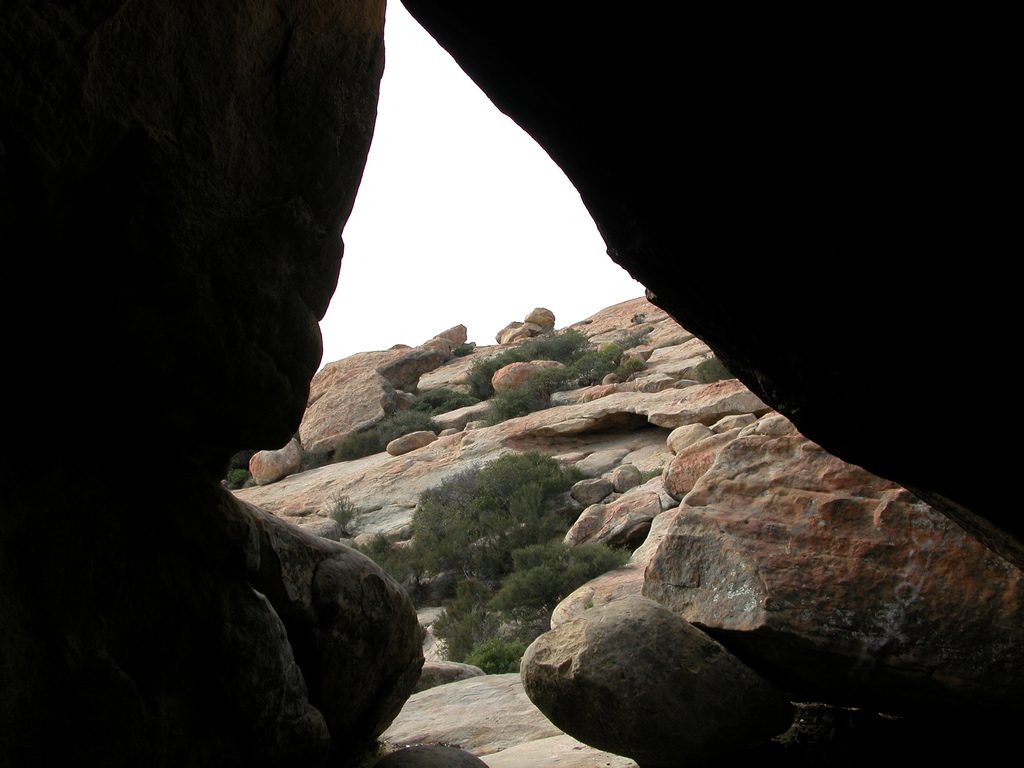
Cave in Coldwater Sandstone at Lizard's Mouth Santa Ynez Range, CA

== Deposition environment and tectonic history ==
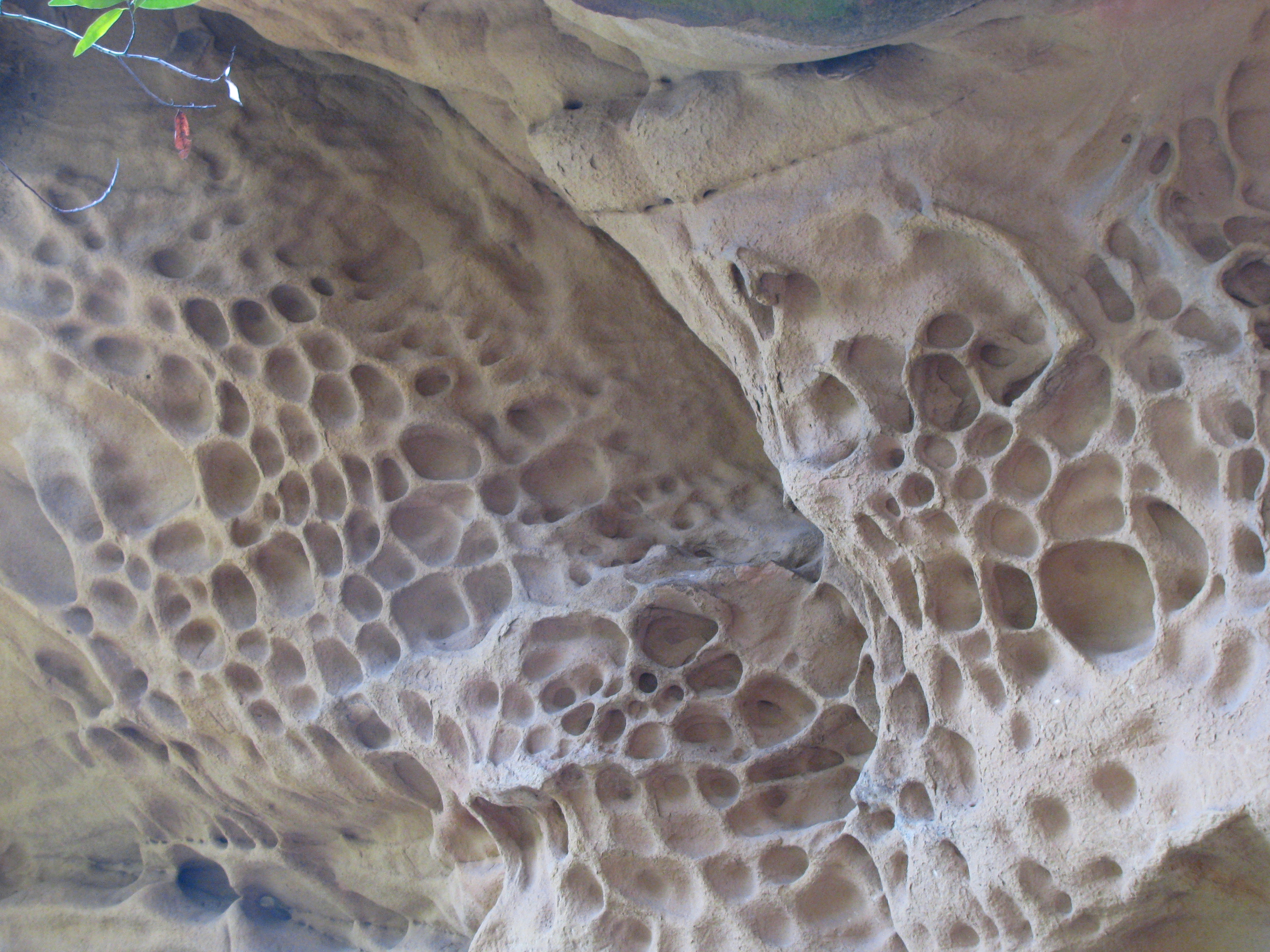
Coldwater Sandstone in Chumash Painted Cave State Historic Park, California, showing honeycomb weathering.

The unit is of middle to upper Eocene age, being deposited in a shallow marine environment, during a time in which the sea was receding and becoming more shallow. Because the process was not uniform, with periods of shallow-water deposition alternating with deeper water conditions, the predominantly sandstone unit is interbedded with siltstones and shales, with the siltstone and shale making up around 20% of the total composition. Late in the period of deposition, large oyster beds appear in the stratigraphic record, indicating a brackish-water nearshore environment. The source rock for the sediment making up the Coldwater was mostly granitic, and pebbles or cobbles of granite and quartzite appear in some of the nearshore sandstones near the top of the unit. At its top the unit grades into the redbeds and conglomerates of the Sespe Formation, which was deposited in a floodplain, riverine, and estuarine environment onshore.

A 1996 study by Donald R. Prothero and Robert J. Emry determined the age of the unit using magnetostratigraphy, and gave its period of deposition as from 39.5 Ma (million years ago) to 42.5 Ma. Additionally, studies of the correlation of the underlying Cozy Dell and Matilija Sandstone with similar units in the California Central Valley, along with paleomagnetic data, show that the tectonic block on which the Coldwater and its surrounding formations were deposited – including the western part of the Transverse Ranges – has rotated clockwise almost 90 degrees since the time of deposition, also moving north-northwest from its original location. This finding is consistent with earlier studies that found evidence for the large clockwise rotation of the Transverse Ranges in California. Uplift along the Santa Ynez Fault during the Quaternary period – the last 2.5 million years – has brought the Coldwater and the other formations up from their deposition environments to their present prominent locations in the Santa Ynez Range. In the area north and northeast of Santa Barbara, on the south slope of the Santa Ynez Mountains eastward to near Ojai, the compression and folding associated with tectonic movements have been sufficiently intense to overturn the rock units so that the older ones are on top. This stretch of overturned rock formations is known as the "Montecito Overturn".

== Paleontology ==
Fossils of numerous mollusks, including many species of the genus Turritella can be found in the Coldwater, particularly near the top of the formation where the water at time of deposition was shallowest. Outcrops along Old San Marcos Pass Road above Goleta and near the contact with the Sespe Formation are rich locations for finding remnants of these sea-snails. Elsewhere near the top contact with the Sespe, the remnants of oyster beds can be found.

== See also ==
- Paleogene California
- Sandstone formations of the United States
