= Espada Formation =

Sedimentary rock formation widespread in Santa Barbara County, California

- Stratigraphic range: Late Jurassic, Late Cretaceous
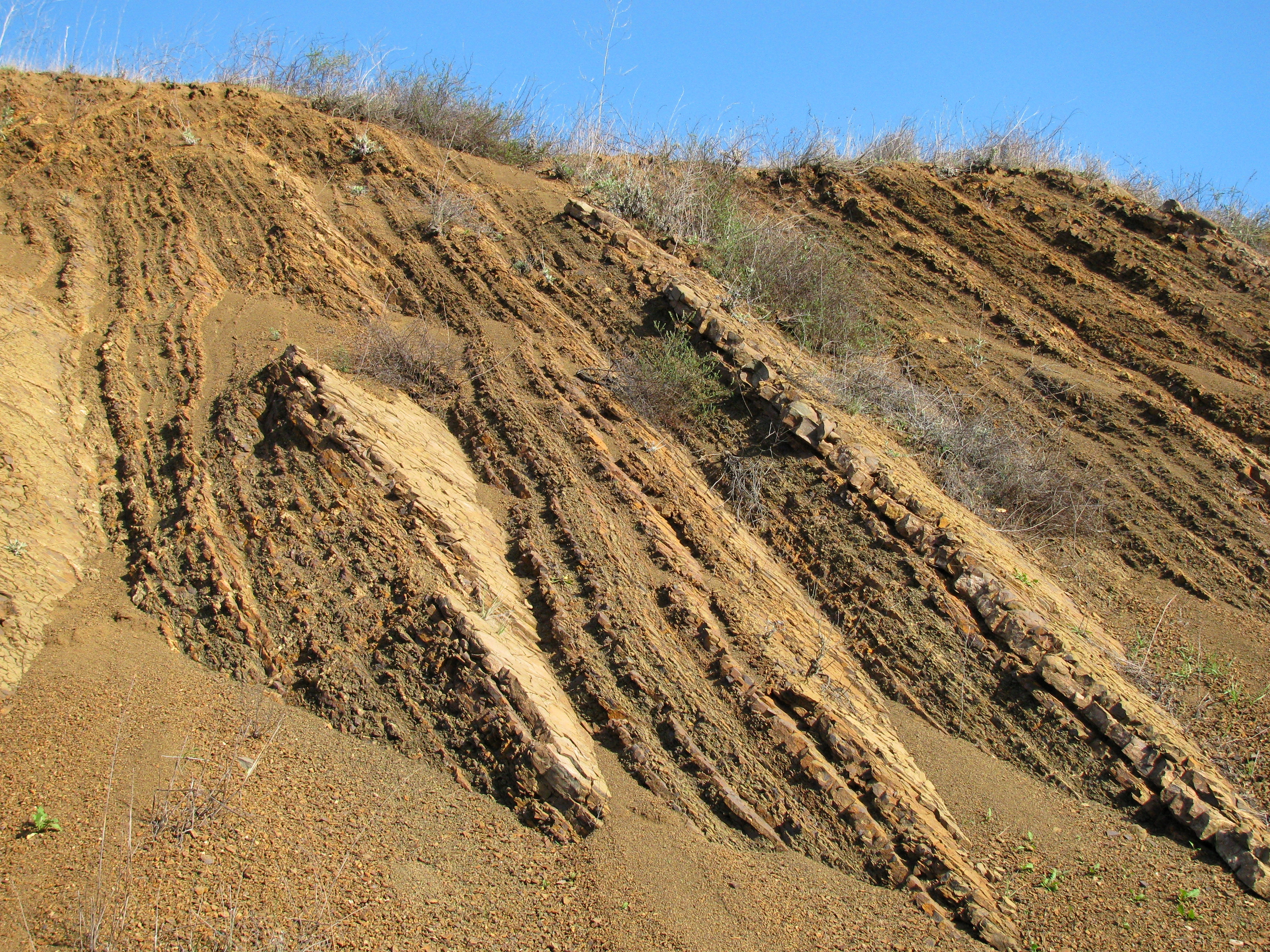
- Beds of the Espada Formation in the western Santa Ynez Mountains.
- Type: Sedimentary
- Underlies: Jalama Formation, Sierra Blanca Limestone, others
- Overlies: Honda Formation, Franciscan Formation
- Thickness: Up to 16,000 feet (4,900 meters)

Lithology
- Primary: Shale, sandstone

Location
- Region: Coastal and interior southern California
- Country: United States

Type section
- Named by: Thomas Dibblee (1950)

The Espada Formation is a sedimentary rock formation widespread in Santa Barbara County, California. Of late Jurassic to Cretaceous age, the unit consists primarily of shale with some interbedded thin layers of sandstone, conglomerate, and limestone.

== Type locality and description ==
The type locality of the Espada Formation is in Hondo Canyon, near Point Arguello, as first described by Thomas Dibblee in his 1950 book on the geology of southwestern Santa Barbara County. While the unit is 1,200 meters (3,900 feet) thick at the type locality, it is much thicker elsewhere; along the southern slope of the San Rafael Mountains it is exposed from its base to its top, where it is probably in conformable contact with the Jalama Formation, and the total thickness is around 5,300 meters (17,400 feet) – 5 kilometers (three miles) of uninterrupted sedimentary deposition that took place over 50 million years.

The formation throughout its geographic range consists of layer upon layer of well-bedded argillaceous silty to sandy shales, with smaller interbeds of arkosic sandstone. The shales are generally brown with a greenish tinge in fresh, unweathered exposures; upon weathering they develop a variety of colors. A few beds of pebble conglomerates and limestone, dark gray and not pure, are also found, but the shales are predominant throughout, accounting for around 90 percent of the entire unit. In general, the sandstone layers become more common towards the top of the stratigraphic column, and the largest conglomerate bed is in the highest part of the Espada, exposed north of the Santa Ynez River near its junction with Mono Canyon. The sandstones are composed of grains which are similar mineralogically to the underlying Franciscan Formation.

== Deposition environment and geologic history ==
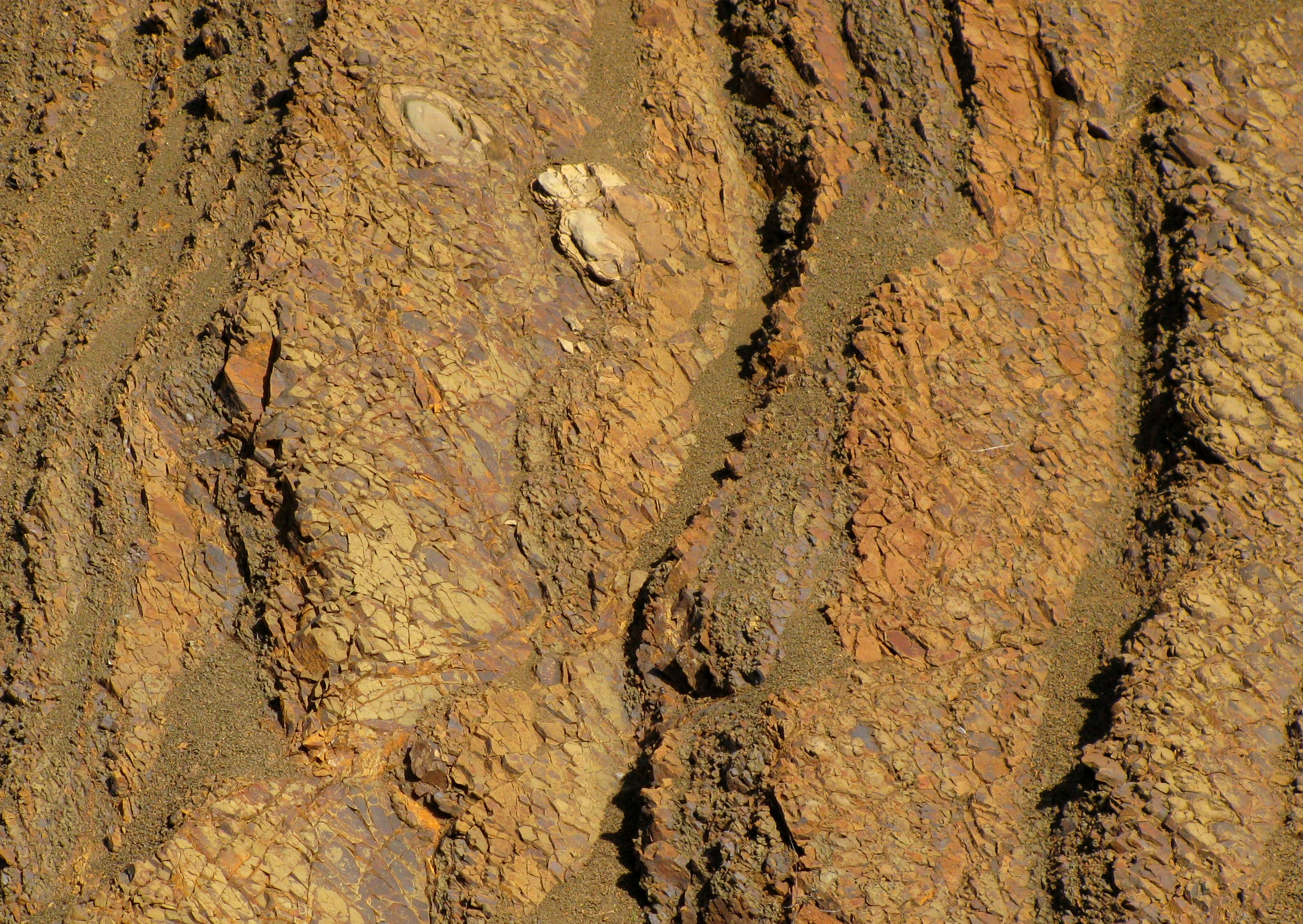
Close view of the Espada Formation. Scale is about 6-7 feet (2 meters) across.

The Espada Formation represents a long period of geologic history – tens of millions of years – in which sediments were deposited in warm, quiet water in a basin that was gradually subsiding. The water was usually shallow, as indicated by the frequent sandstone beds (coarse sediment such as sand is deposited nearer shore unless carried far offshore by submarine landslides and other subsea mass movements). The Espada resembles some strata of the underlying Franciscan Formation, even though the two units may have been deposited at great distances from each other, and brought together by tectonic forces along the boundaries of the Pacific and North American Plates.

The crustal block on which the Espada was deposited has been shifted northwestward along the plate boundaries and rotated approximately 90 degrees since the time of its deposition. Most of the movement took place recently, compared to the time of deposition – in the Miocene and Pliocene eras. As the block shifted northward, the formation was also subject to folding, resulting in creation of structures such as the Mono syncline, which includes Camuesa Peak north of Gibraltar Reservoir, and the parallel Agua Caliente anticline.

== Paleontology ==
Relatively few fossils are found in the Espada, considering its extent and immense depth, but those that are found mostly indicate a Cretaceous age. Buchia piochii, found in the lowest part of the Espada, has been dated to the late Jurassic, which gives the low extreme for age of the unit; Coralliochana orcutti is found near the top, indicating late Cretaceous age and warm water, suggestive of tropical conditions. Other fossils found include mollusks, ammonites, baculites, and pelecypods.
