= Matilija Sandstone =

Southern California geological formation

- Stratigraphic range: Eocene
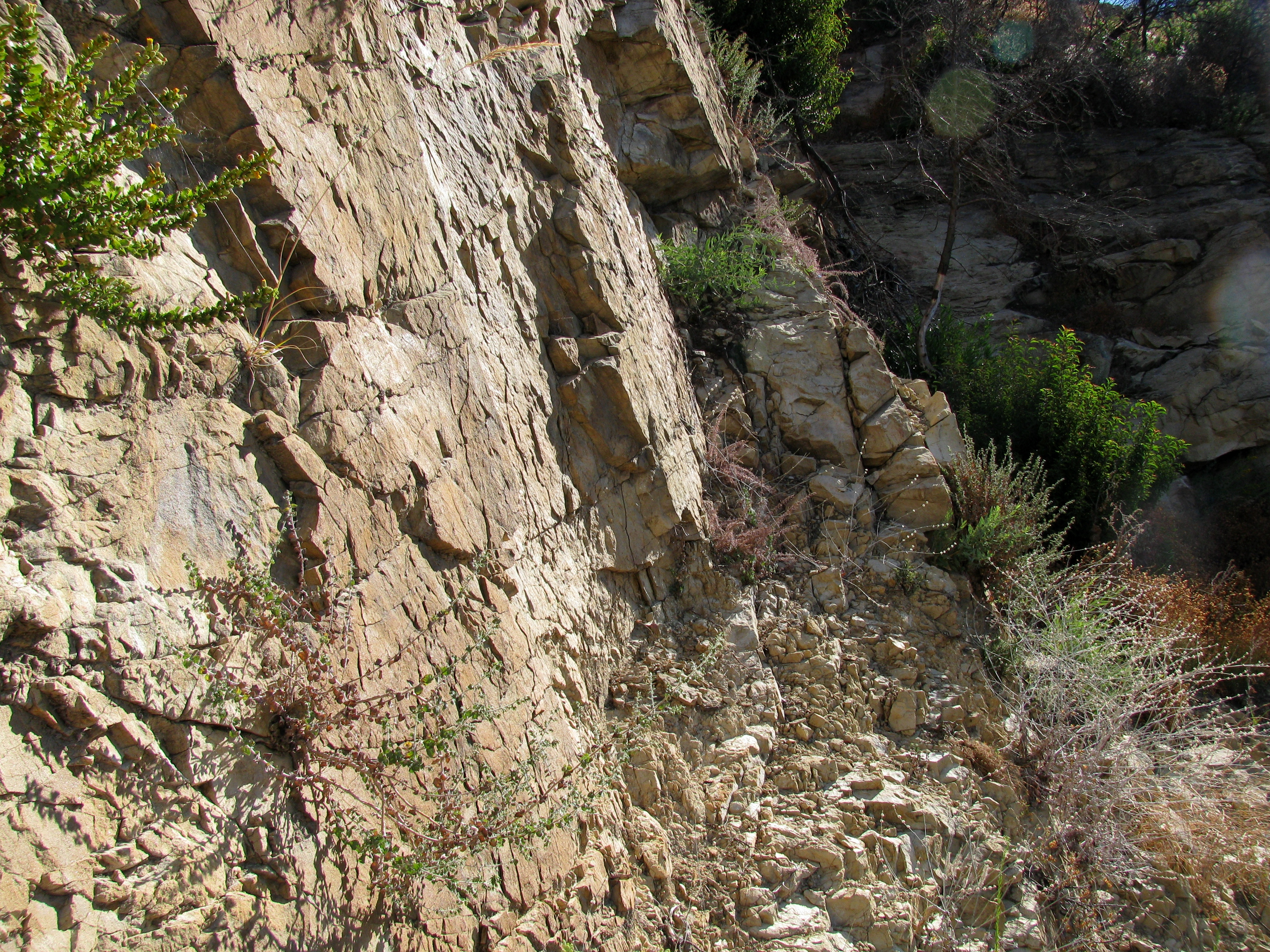
- Outcrop of the Matilija Sandstone in the Santa Ynez Mountains, California.
- Type: sedimentary
- Underlies: Cozy Dell Shale
- Overlies: Juncal Formation
- Thickness: 0–2,500 ft (0–762 m)

Lithology
- Primary: Sandstone

Location
- Region: Coastal southern California
- Country: United States

Type section
- Named by: T. Dibblee

The Matilija Sandstone (/məˈtɪləhə/) is a sedimentary geologic unit of Eocene epoch in the Paleogene Period, found in Santa Barbara and Ventura Counties in Southern California.

It consists of thick layers of sandstone, made up of grains of feldspar and quartz from a granitic source rock, interbedded with thin layers of siltstone and shale. Hard, massive, and exceptionally resistant to weathering, it forms the high rocky summits of the Santa Ynez Mountain range north of Santa Barbara, eastward into Ventura County.

== Type locality, description, and distribution ==
The type locality of the unit is at Matilija Hot Springs, along the Ventura River about ten miles (16 km) northwest of Ojai, near to California State Route 33. At its type locality it is around 2,500 feet (760 m) thick, and consists of both marine and non-marine sandstones with occasional thin beds of micaceous shale separating massive sandstone layers. The sandstone layers are made up of well-sorted grains of quartz and feldspar. The unit can be found along the crest of the Santa Ynez range all the way from the western extremity of the mountains near Point Arguello, to its type locality north of Ojai, and east and northeast into the Ventura County backcountry, where Piru and Sespe creeks cross through the formation. It accounts for the highest peaks in the Santa Ynez range, dipping underneath the younger Coldwater Sandstone, Cozy Dell Shale, and Sespe Formation near San Marcos Pass in the center of the range.

The thickness of the unit is widely variable, generally decreasing to the west. In its type locality it is around 2,500 feet (760 m) thick; in the vicinity of La Cumbre Peak it is 2,000 feet (610 m) thick; and while it thins to only 500 feet (150 m) thick underneath San Marcos Pass, it thickens again to around 2,000 feet (610 m) at the high summits of Santa Ynez and Broadcast Peaks. It thins westward from there, being only 500 feet (150 m) thick at Refugio Pass, and less than 300 in the Santa Rosa Hills and west to Point Conception.

Along with the younger Coldwater Formation, the Matilija is the source of the enormous sandstone boulders which are found abundantly along the creeks and shoreline of Santa Barbara and Goleta. Additionally, boulders are strewn on hillsides in the upper Riviera, and elsewhere on hillsides and floodplains. These boulders, none of which can be moved even in the most intense modern-day flood events, tumbled down the mountains during Pleistocene-age storms and mudflows of unimaginable intensity. Boulders of the Matilija were included in the mud and debris flows in the January 2018 Montecito mudflows.

The Matilija Sandstone produces little soil when it weathers, and generally supports only hard chaparral on slopes that are not bare rock. North-facing slopes have some stands of pine and fir in the higher elevations.

The formation appears in boreholes drilled into oil fields offshore, indicating the formation dips steeply underneath the Santa Barbara Channel. At the Point Conception Oil Field, the Matilija is at least 2,000 feet (610 m) thick, and first appears approximately 4,300 feet (1,300 m) below ground surface. In the Molino Offshore Gas Field, southeast of Gaviota about two miles (3.2 km) offshore, the formation is at an average of 10,500 feet (3,200 m) below the seafloor, and a well drilled to 12,589 feet (3,837 m) had not reached the bottom of the formation.

== Deposition environment and tectonic history ==
Sometime in the early Eocene, around 50 million years ago, the landmass containing present-day Santa Barbara County became submerged, allowing sediment deposition offshore. During this time the sea alternately deepened and became shallow again, with the deposition environment supporting either sandstones or shales corresponding to shallow or deep conditions. The Matilija Sandstone dates from the earliest sustained shallow-water episode during this time, the period from 48.5 to 46 million years ago. Additionally, the piece of the crustal block on which the sandstone was deposited has rotated approximately 90 degrees clockwise since the time of deposition, moving from a location approximately adjacent to present-day San Diego to the region it occupies in the present day.

After reaching its current position along the coast, the entire Santa Ynez Range was uplifted, mostly during the Quaternary period and late Pliocene, by crustal shortening and compression from tectonic forces at the boundary of the Pacific and North American Plates. The Matilija Sandstone and other units, formerly submerged, rose over 4,000 feet (1,200 m) from their original positions. In some places the forces causing this uplift were so abrupt that sedimentary layers deposited as recently as the Pleistocene are now angled 60 degrees from horizontal.

== Paleontology ==
While the formation is rich in microfossils, it is considered to be of low paleontologic sensitivity, i.e. larger fossils are unlikely to be encountered. In the Santa Rosa Hills, the unit has yielded numerous shells of molluscs, including bivalves and gastropods.

== Economic importance ==
As a potential reservoir for oil and gas deposits, the Matilija Sandstone is grouped with the above-lying Cozy Dell Shale and Coldwater Sandstone as the Gaviota-Sacate-Matilija Sandstone Play. The likely source rocks for any petroleum accumulation in the Gaviota-Sacate-Matilija Play are the lower-lying organic-rich shale units, such as the Juncal-Anita Formations.

Since this deep-lying play is incompletely explored, with many boreholes not even reaching the Matilija, the estimates for hydrocarbon resources are speculative, with the United States Bureau of Ocean Energy Management, Regulation and Enforcement giving a range of 117 to 127 million barrels (18,600,000 to 20,200,000 m^{3}) of oil recoverable using current technology for the entire Santa Barbara-Ventura Basin Province. In general, in the eastern and central parts of the basin, the sandstone would be too deeply buried to have reservoir potential. However, the area potentially containing oil and gas is large, including approximately 1,500 square miles (3,900 km^{2}) within the Federal Outer Continental Shelf. The largest single hydrocarbon accumulation yet identified in the Matilija Sandstone is in the Molino Offshore Gas Field, discovered in 1983, and contains approximately 39 million barrels (6,200,000 m^{3}) of oil equivalent.

== See also ==
- Paleogene California
- Sandstone formations of the United States
