= Purple sage =

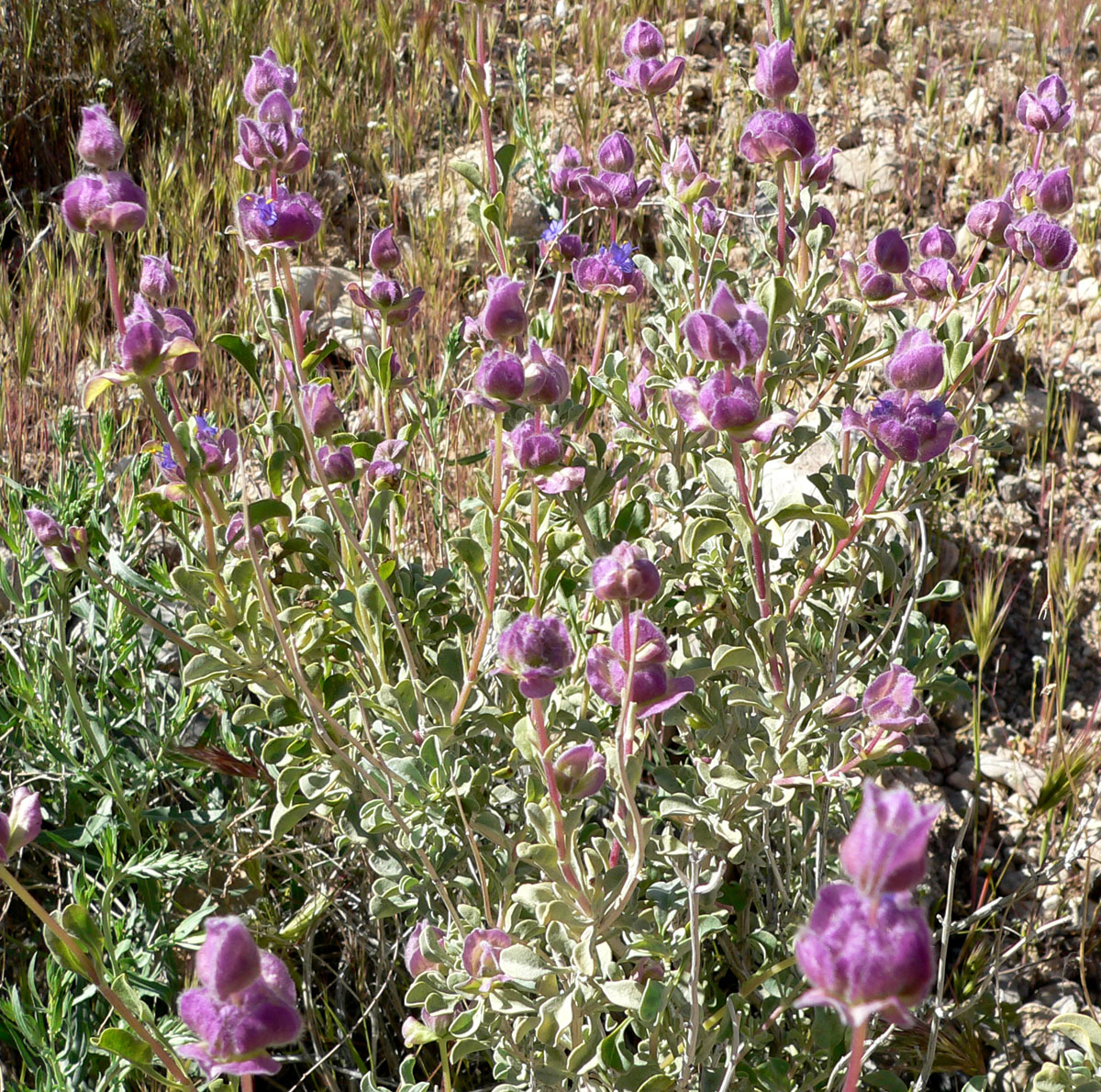
One kind of "purple sage", Salvia dorrii

Purple sage has various meanings, mostly referring to plants or to Zane Grey's novel Riders of the Purple Sage, set in Utah. There is disagreement about which plant Grey had in mind.

== Plants ==
- Certain true sages, members of the genus Salvia in the mint family, are referred to as purple sage:
  - Salvia dorrii, also called Ute tobacco sage, Dorr's sage, etc., has showy purple flowers. It is a mild hallucinogen when smoked, and is used in Native American ceremonies and Native American herbal medicine. It is native to the western United States, including Utah, and has been suggested as the plant Grey had in mind.
  - Salvia leucophylla, also called San Luis sage, likewise producing showy purple flowers, is native to California and Baja California and used in xeriscaping in Southern California.
  - Salvia pachyphylla, called giant-flowered purple sage, blue sage, etc., a shrub native to California and bordering areas, is used in xeriscaping in colder regions.
  - Salvia officinalis 'Purpurascens' is the purplish-leaved variety (or group of varieties) of common sage.
- Poliomintha incana, also called frosted sage, gray mint, etc., is a small, pale purple-flowered shrub of the mint family native to the Southwestern U.S. and northern Mexico. It is found in the Colorado Plateau area of Utah and has been suggested as the plant Grey had in mind.
- Leucophyllum frutescens, also called Texas sage, barometer bush, etc., is a purple-flowered shrub of Texas (where it is the official state native shrub) and Mexico. Though it has been considered "the purple sage of cowboy song fame", it is not the plant of Grey's novel, as it is known in the U.S. only from Texas.
- Psorothamnus scoparius, formerly Dalea scoparia and more often called broom dalea, is a purple-flowered, nearly leafless shrub found in Texas, New Mexico, Arizona, and Mexico.
- Sagebrushes (Artemisia), loosely called sage, are dominant plants in parts of Utah. They have been identified, both tentatively and more confidently, as the plant Grey had in mind. The purple color would be that of aerial perspective, as Grey mentioned:

"The sage about him was breast-high to his horse, oversweet with its warm, fragrant breath, gray where it waved to the light, darker where the wind left it still, and beyond the wonderful haze-purple lent by distance."

== Other uses ==
- Riders of the Purple Sage is a novel by Zane Grey, and several films based on the novel.
- Riders of the Purple Sage (band) is a name used by three separate western bands in the United States.
- New Riders of the Purple Sage is an American country rock band; New Riders of the Purple Sage is their debut album.
- Purple Sage, Wyoming, is a census-designated place in Sweetwater County, Wyoming.
- Open-source software for arithmetic geometry, closely related to SageMath
