= Nojoqui Falls =

Horsetail waterfall, California, U.S.

Nojoqui Falls County Park
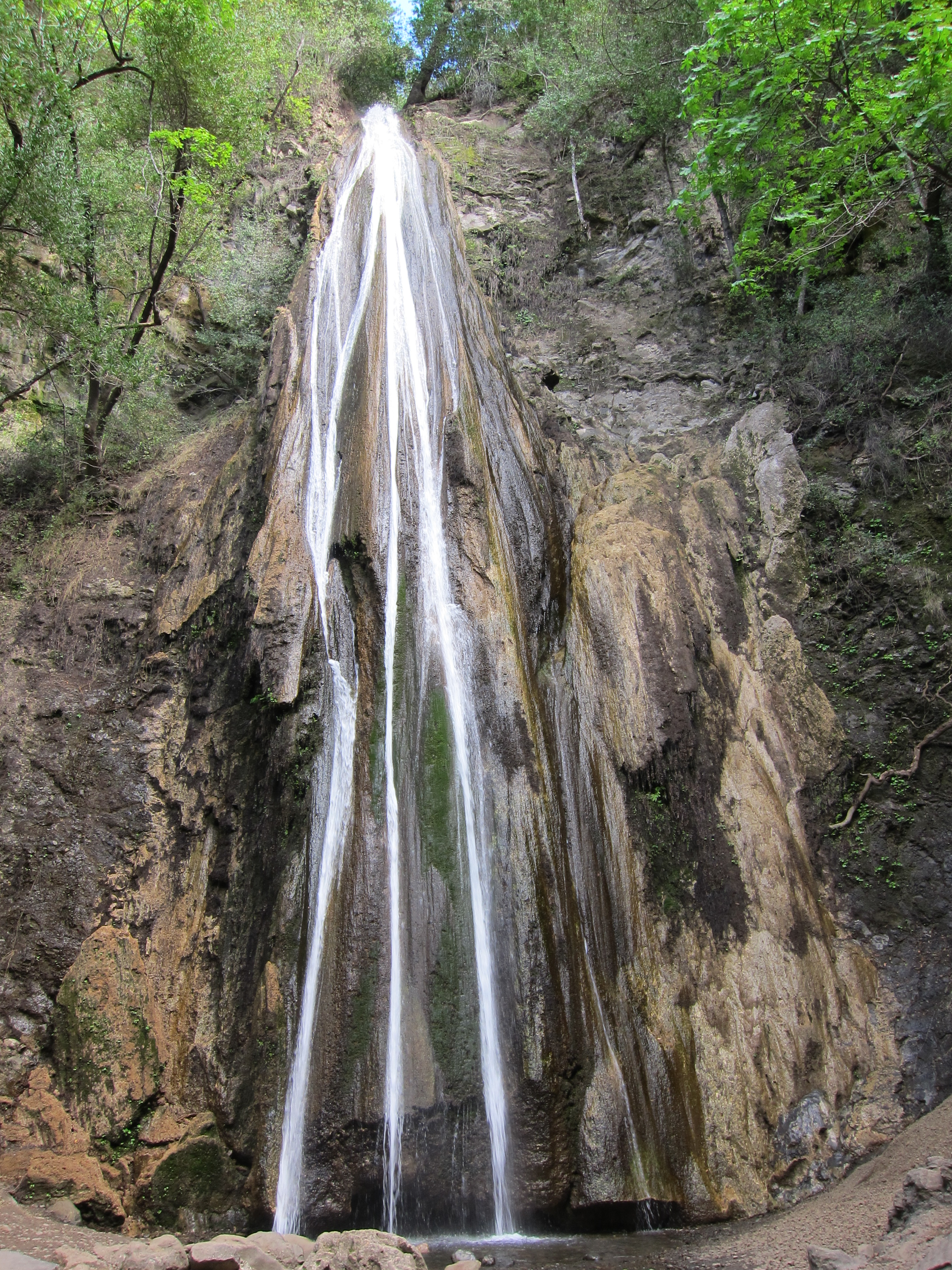
- Nojoqui Falls, April 2011

- Location within California
- Location: Santa Barbara County, California, United States
- Nearest city: Buellton
- Coordinates: 34.5298°N 120.1752°W
- Governing body: Santa Barbara County Department of Parks and Recreation
- Website: www.countyofsb.org/parks/parks02.aspx?id=8068

Nojoqui Falls (pronounced na-hoo-ui) is a seasonal waterfall in the Santa Barbara County, California, park of the same name.

== Description ==
Nojoqui has been described as "one of the most graceful waterfalls in California" and "the highlight of the scenic drive along U.S. 101 between the coast and Solvang."

The falls drop nearly 100 feet over a sandstone wall of the Jalama Formation.

From the sign posted near the falls: "Unlike most waterfalls, which gradually erode upstream, the Nojoqui Falls have built outward from the cliff over time. Calcium and magnesium carbonate from rocks above the falls continually dissolve in the stream water, then are deposited as this water evaporates from the rock around the falls. Stalactites in a cave grow in the same slow manner, and are made of the same type of rock, called travertine. Grooves in the main travertine deposit and a gently curved notch at the base of the falls have formed where the rock has dissolved once again into the stream."

The waterfall is rainfall-dependent and "usually dries up in summer."

In December 2014 multiple landslides closed the trail to the falls. The landslides occurred on December 3, 2014, at approximately 11:30 AM near the end of the trail. Seven hikers were in the area when the landslide occurred but there were no injuries and initial reports that they were trapped were false. The landslides were caused by heavy rain in the area.

== Location ==
The falls are located one and a half miles east of Highway 101 approximately five miles south of Buellton and about 7 miles southwest of the city of Solvang via Alisal Road.

The falls are at the end of a short trail south of the parking lot.

== See also ==
- List of waterfalls
- List of waterfalls in California
