= Cozy Dell Shale =

Eocene geologic formation in California

- Stratigraphic range: Eocene
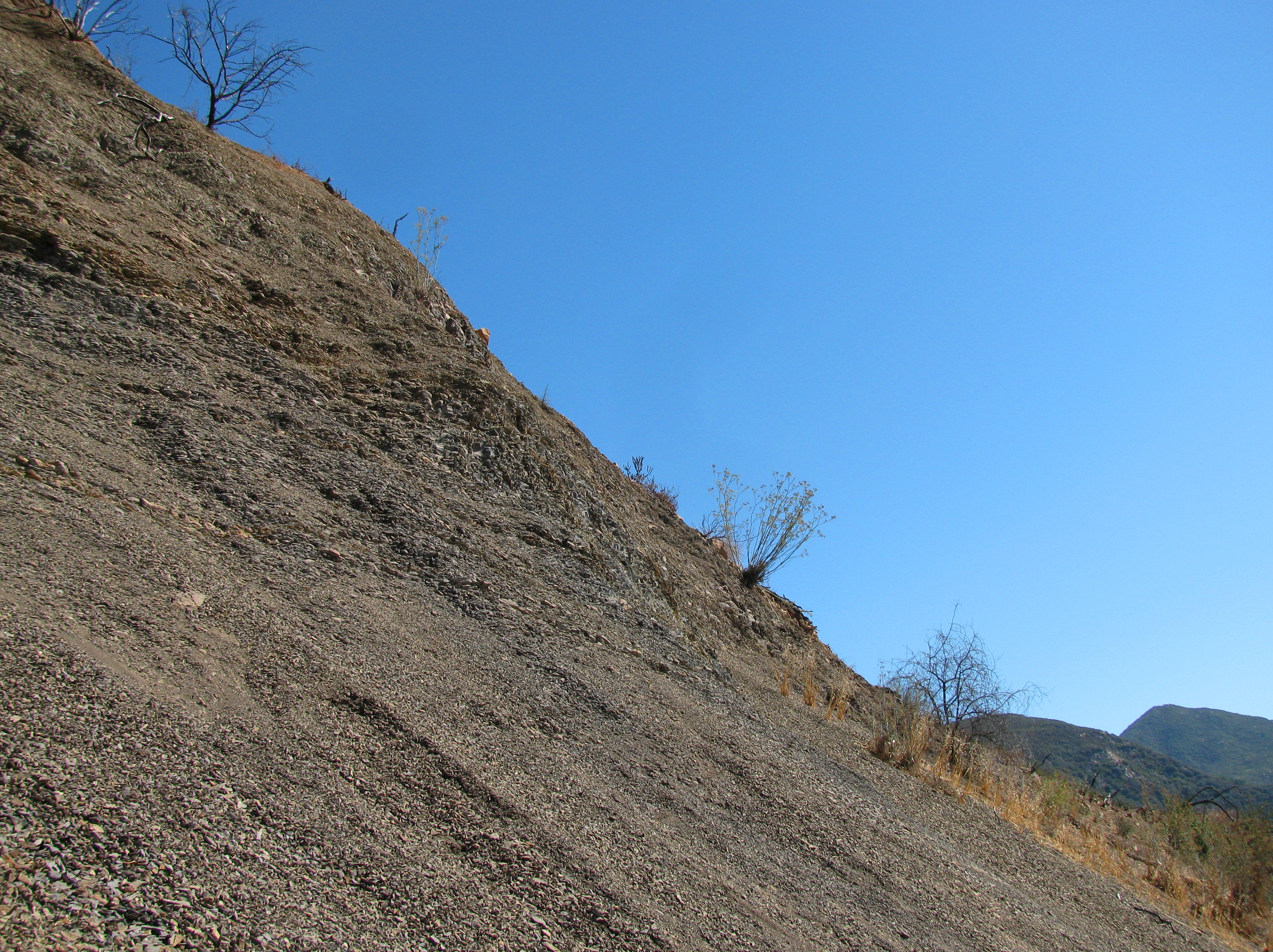
- Talus slope on an outcrop of Cozy Dell Shale, Santa Ynez Mountains, California.
- Type: sedimentary
- Underlies: Coldwater Sandstone
- Overlies: Matilija Sandstone
- Thickness: 350 to 4,000 feet (107 to 1,219 m)

Lithology
- Primary: shale
- Other: minor sandstone beds, calcareous nodules

Location
- Region: Coastal southern California
- Country: United States

Type section
- Named for: Cozy Dell Canyon, Ventura County
- Named by: Kerr and Schenck (1928)

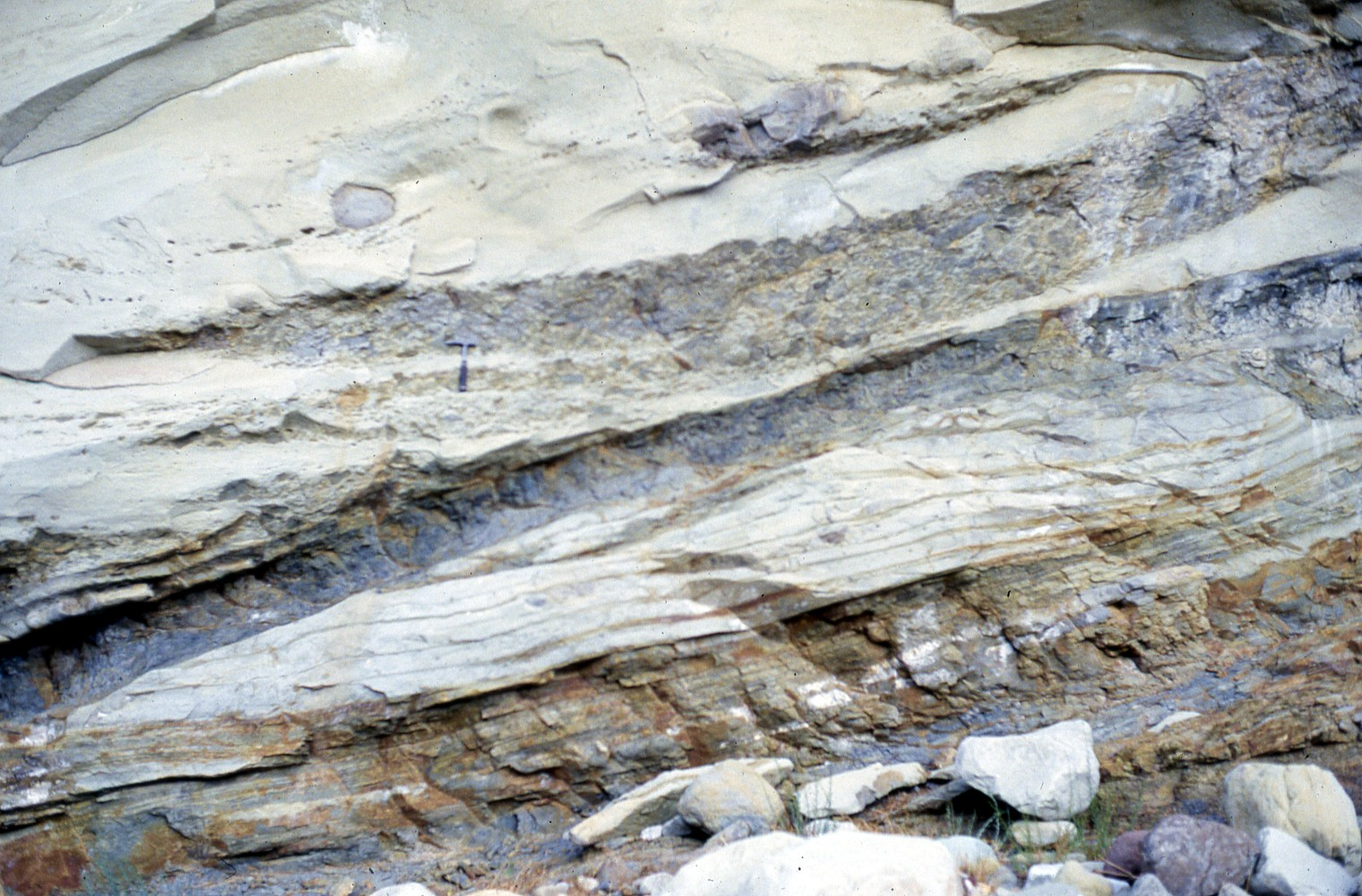
Giant shale rip-up clast (bottom of photo) at the base of a high-density turbidite. Cozy Dell formation, Topatopa Mountains.

The Cozy Dell Shale is a geologic formation of middle Eocene age that crops out in the Santa Ynez Mountains and Topatopa Mountains of California, extending from north of Fillmore in Ventura County westward to near Point Arguello, north of Santa Barbara. Because the Cozy Dell easily weathers to a clay-rich soil, it crops out infrequently and generally forms dense stands of chaparral in saddles between peaks and ridges of the more resistant Matilija and Coldwater formations.

== Type locality and extent ==
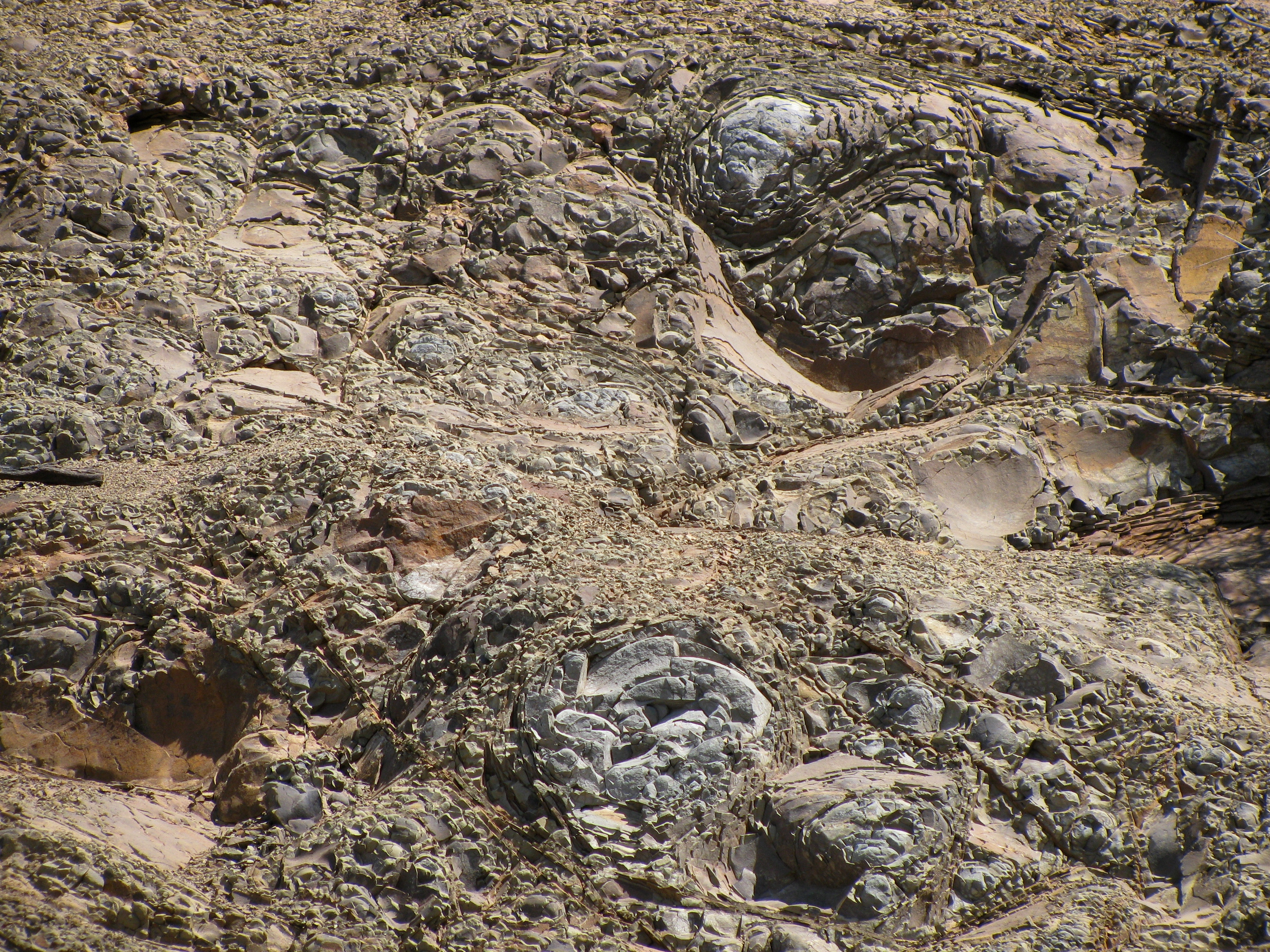
Close-up of bedding in the Cozy Dell Shale. Scale is about 10 feet (3 m) across.

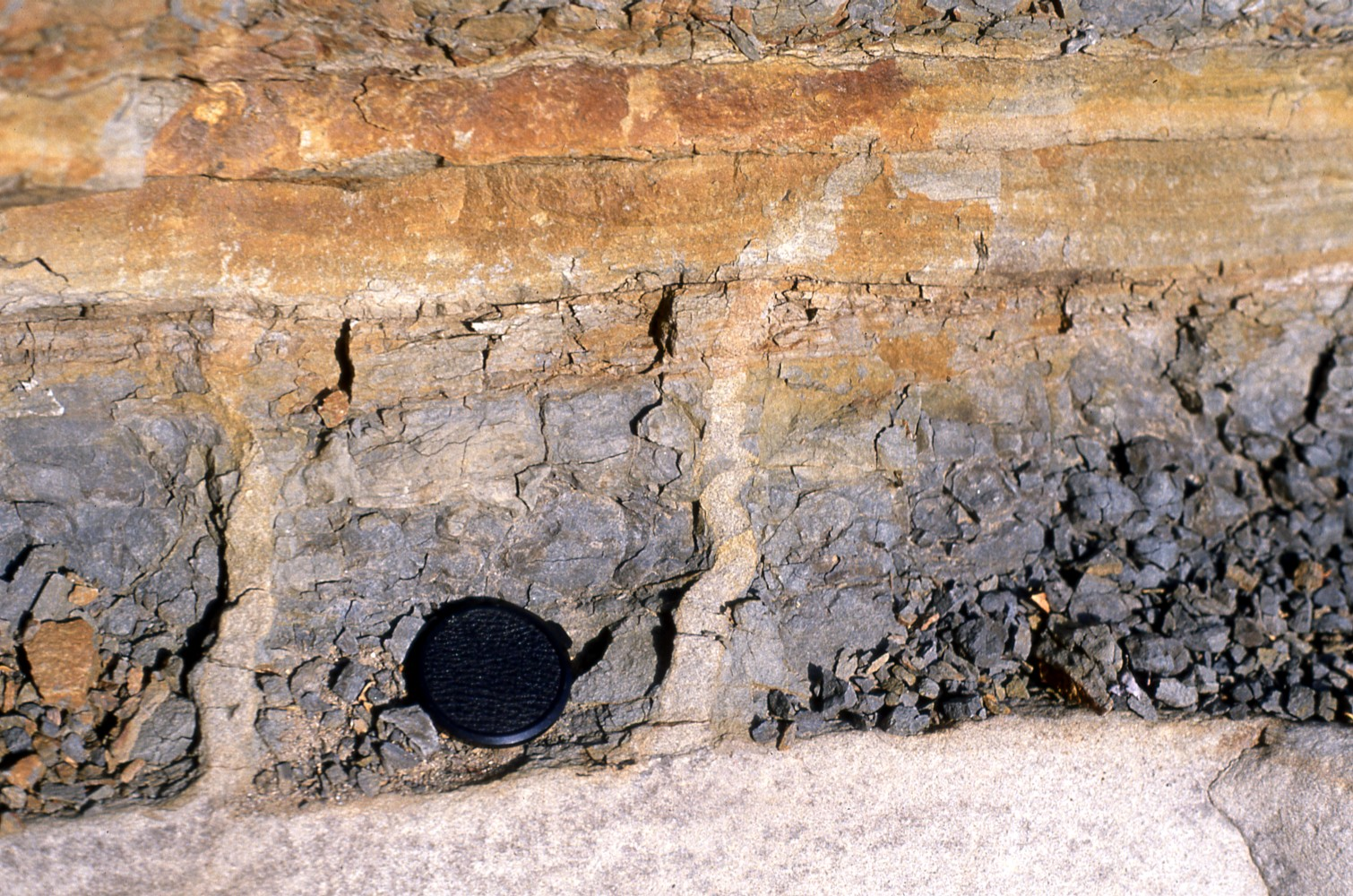
De-watering pipes above a high-density turbidite, Cozy Dell formation, Topatopa Mountains.

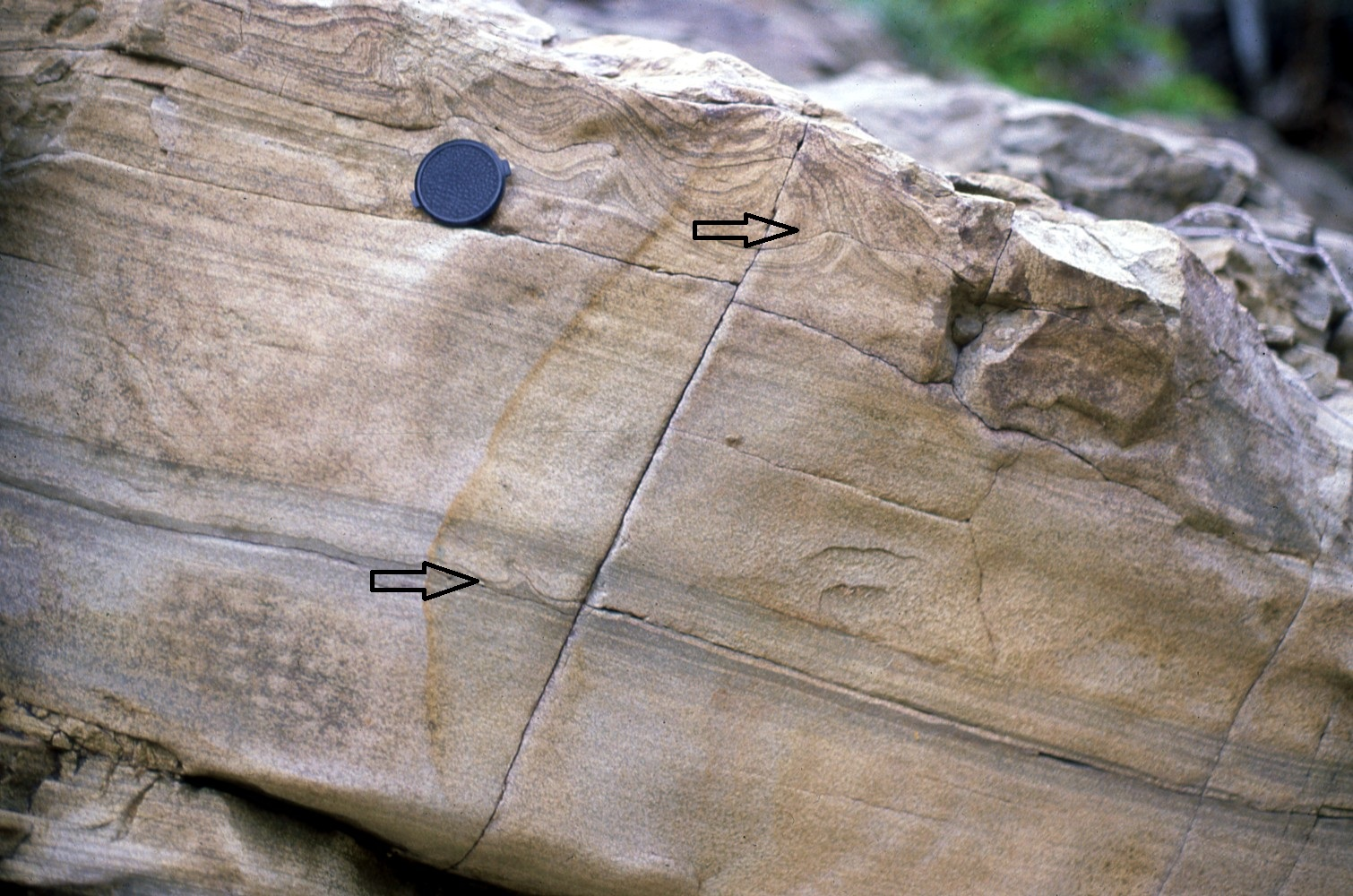
Flame structures and convolute laminations in a sandy turbidite, Cozy Dell formation, Topatopa Mountains.

The Cozy Dell was first described in 1928 as the middle member of the Tejon Formation. However, Dibblee (1966) reclassified it as a formation, along with the underlying Matilija Sandstone and overlying Coldwater Sandstone. He also named the formation after its type locality at Cozy Dell Canyon, which is located on the south side of Nordhoff Ridge, just north of Ojai in Ventura County.

The Cozy Dell crops out continuously in the mountains to the north and east of Ojai, where it is exposed along much of the south slope of the Topatopa Mountains in Ventura County, and continues westward along the south slope of Santa Ynez Mountains into Santa Barbara County. Here, it is overlain by younger rocks at San Marcos Pass, on the crest of the Santa Ynez Range, cropping out west of the pass and forming much of the crest north of Goleta. It disappears north of the Santa Ynez Mountains beneath younger formations, and is removed, for the most part, by erosion north of the Santa Ynez River, where it appears at only a few localities. It grades into and is overlain by the Sacate Formation in the western part of its outcrop belt, and dips south beneath the modern California coastal plain in the southern part. Continuing south into the offshore region beneath the Santa Barbara Channel, the Cozy Dell is found in oil wells at Molino field some 13,000 feet (3,962 m) feet below the sea floor.

The thickness of the formation increases, more or less, from east to west and averages about 1,700 feet (518 m) in the Santa Ynez Mountains. However, thicknesses vary widely, ranging from a maximum of 4,000 feet (1,219 m) west of San Marcos Pass, to 50 feet (15 m) thick in the subsurface of the offshore Hondo Oil Field, and only 350 feet (107 m) thick in the offshore Molino Gas Field, which is located west of Hondo.

== Description ==
The Cozy Dell is a gray to dark gray argillaceous to silty shale that weathers to brown and olive. It contains minor sandstone beds at some localities, and some conglomerate at others, most significantly west of San Marcos Pass. When exposed to surface conditions, it breaks down quickly to form a clay-rich soil that supports dense chaparral growth. Because the Cozy Dell is layered between the highly resistant Matilija and Coldwater sandstones, and turned up on end through most of its extent, it erodes to create passes and saddles between peaks and ridges of the adjacent units.

== Paleontology, age and depositional environments ==
Microfauna in the Cozy Dell, primarily planktonic (i.e., floating) foraminifera, place it in the upper part of the Lutetian stage (middle Eocene) of the geologic timescale - the Lutetian correlating, more or less, to the middle part of a local Californian stage named the Narizian that is based largely on benthic (i.e., bottom-dwelling) foraminifera. Although the formation is rich in microfossils, especially ones indicating deep-marine deposition, no significant larger fossils have been found in southwestern Santa Barbara County. However, some larger fossils have been found in a few localities in the Topatopa Mountains to the east in Ventura County, particularly in the upper Sespe Creek area near Ojai, which contains an unusual shallow-marine assemblage of molluscs, starfish and brittle stars, as well as plant imprints that indicate close proximity to an ancient shoreline.

The Cozy Dell represents a time when the Eocene sea covering the California border land region reached its widest extent and maximum water depths. Thus, only the finest-grained sediments, principally a micaceous mud, reached the ocean bottom. A fairly high organic content of up to 3% or more of Total Organic Carbon (TOC) in these sediments indicate that microorganisms flourished and that there were anoxic conditions on the ocean floor conducive to the preservation of organic matter. These observations, together with the fossil evidence, indicate that the Cozy Dell was deposited in an ocean basin with a shoreline on what today would be the east and north side of the basin and gradually deepening to the west to water depths of possibly a thousand feet or more.

== Magnetostratigraphy ==
Recent magnetostratigraphic dating demonstrates that the Cozy Dell at its type locality was deposited during the chron 20 geomagnetic reversal through the chron 19 reversal - approximately 46 to 42 Ma (million years ago), which is consistent with deposition during Lutetian time. The paleomagnetic data also show that the tectonic block on which the Cozy Dell was deposited with other Eocene formations has rotated clockwise about 100 degrees since the onset of deposition. Thus, modern-day east-west trends indicated within the formation would originally have been oriented north-south.

== Economic importance ==
The Cozy Dell is grouped with underlying and overlying sandstones as a potential hydrocarbon resource. Where this shale is found in the subsurface of oil and gas fields on the California coast, and offshore in the Santa Barbara Channel, it tends to be impermeable to fluid flow, as with most shales, and represents a cap rock that can trap hydrocarbons in underlying sandstone reservoirs. However, a few offshore oil fields contain sections of Cozy Dell with sufficient porosity to act as petroleum reservoirs, and sufficient permeability to produce hydrocarbons at economic rates. One example is the now-abandoned Cuarta field, located about six miles offshore from Gaviota, where the Cozy Dell is mainly shale but contains minor sandstone interbeds that previously produced oil from 7,000 feet (2,134 m) feet below the ocean floor. Although there is no onshore oil or gas production from the Cozy Dell, its organic content is high enough that some geologists believe it may be a potential source rock for petroleum found in other units.

== See also ==
- Rip-up clasts: often found at the base of sandy turbidites, such as the Cozy Dell
- Lowe sequence: describes a set of sedimentary structures found in some turbidite sandstone beds
