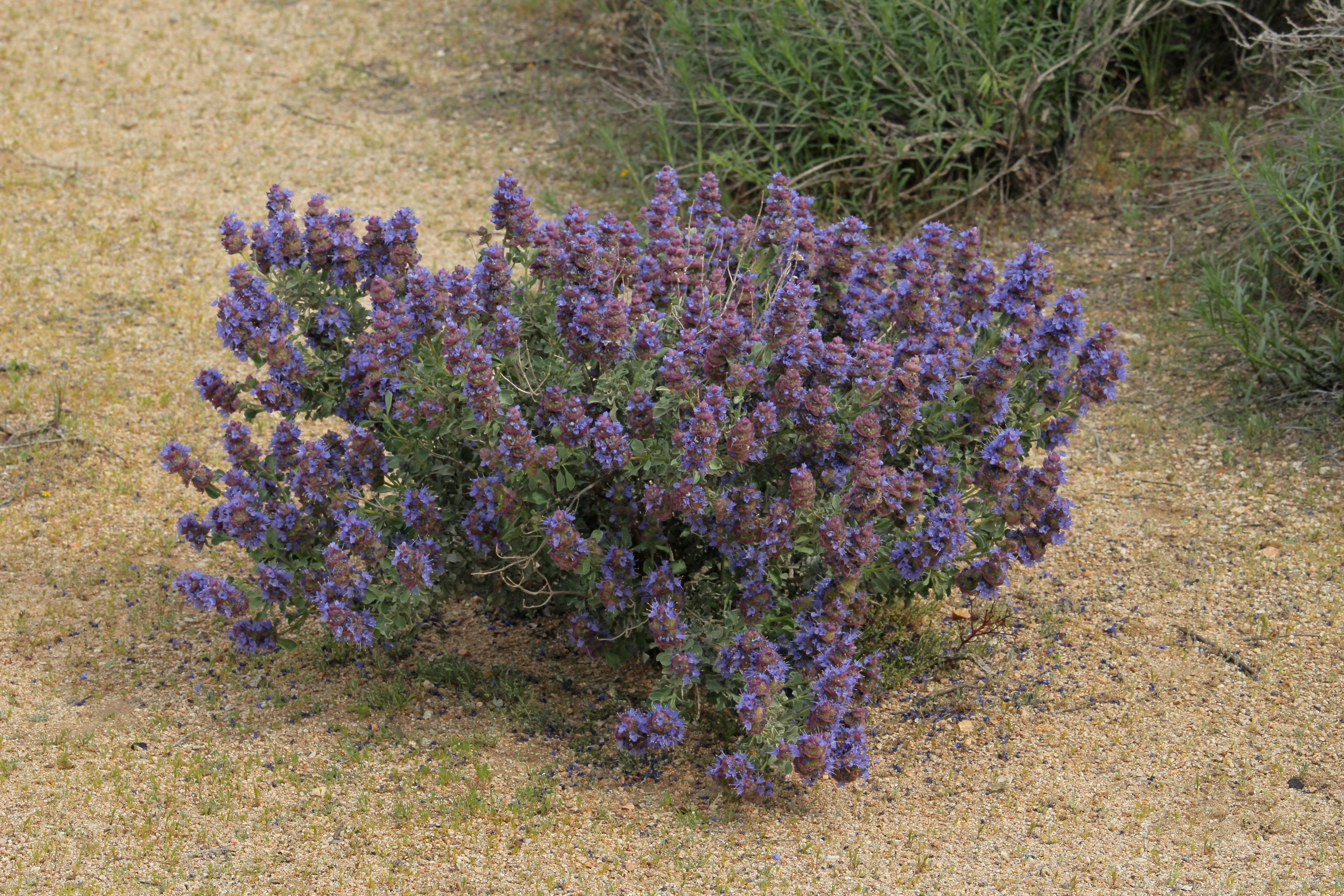

Scientific classification
- Kingdom: Plantae
- Clade: Tracheophytes
- Clade: Angiosperms
- Clade: Eudicots
- Clade: Asterids
- Order: Lamiales
- Family: Lamiaceae
- Genus: Salvia
- Species: S. dorrii

Binomial name
- Salvia dorrii (Kellogg) Abrams

= Salvia dorrii =

Species of shrub

Salvia dorrii, the purple sage, Dorr's sage, fleshy sage, mint sage, or tobacco sage, is a perennial spreading shrub in the family Lamiaceae. It is native to mountain areas in the western United States, particularly northwestern Arizona, New Mexico, and West Texas, found mainly in the Great Basin and southward to the Mojave Desert, growing in dry, well draining soils.

== Description ==
Salvia dorrii is a woody subshrub reaching 10–70 cm (4–28 in) in height and width. The grey-green leaves are narrow and lanceolate, are tapered at the base and rounded at the tip generally without teeth or lobes. They are generally basal, and 1–3 cm (3/8–1 1/8 in) long. They have an intense but pleasant, mildly intoxicating minty aroma, with the scent released when the foliage is handled or crushed. The inflorescence is made up of spike-like clusters of numerous purple flowers that are bilaterally symmetric. Each cluster is 12–30 mm (1/2–1 1/8 in) across. Bracts are generally round 5–12 mm (1/4–1/2 in) long. Each calyx is usually 6–11 mm (1/4–3/8 in). The upper lip is most often round without teeth or lobes. The lower lip lobes are pointed without spines. The color is variable, blue to purple to rose. The corolla tube is 6–13 mm (1/4–1/2 in) or so, often blue but sometimes purple to pink to white. The stamens and style protrude from the flower. The latter is forked at the tip. The flowers remain on the plants after being pollinated, with the desiccated flowers remaining for some weeks or months after flowering.

This species features prominently in native American traditional medicine practices.

== Ecology ==
It is a larval host plant to the elegant sphinx moth.

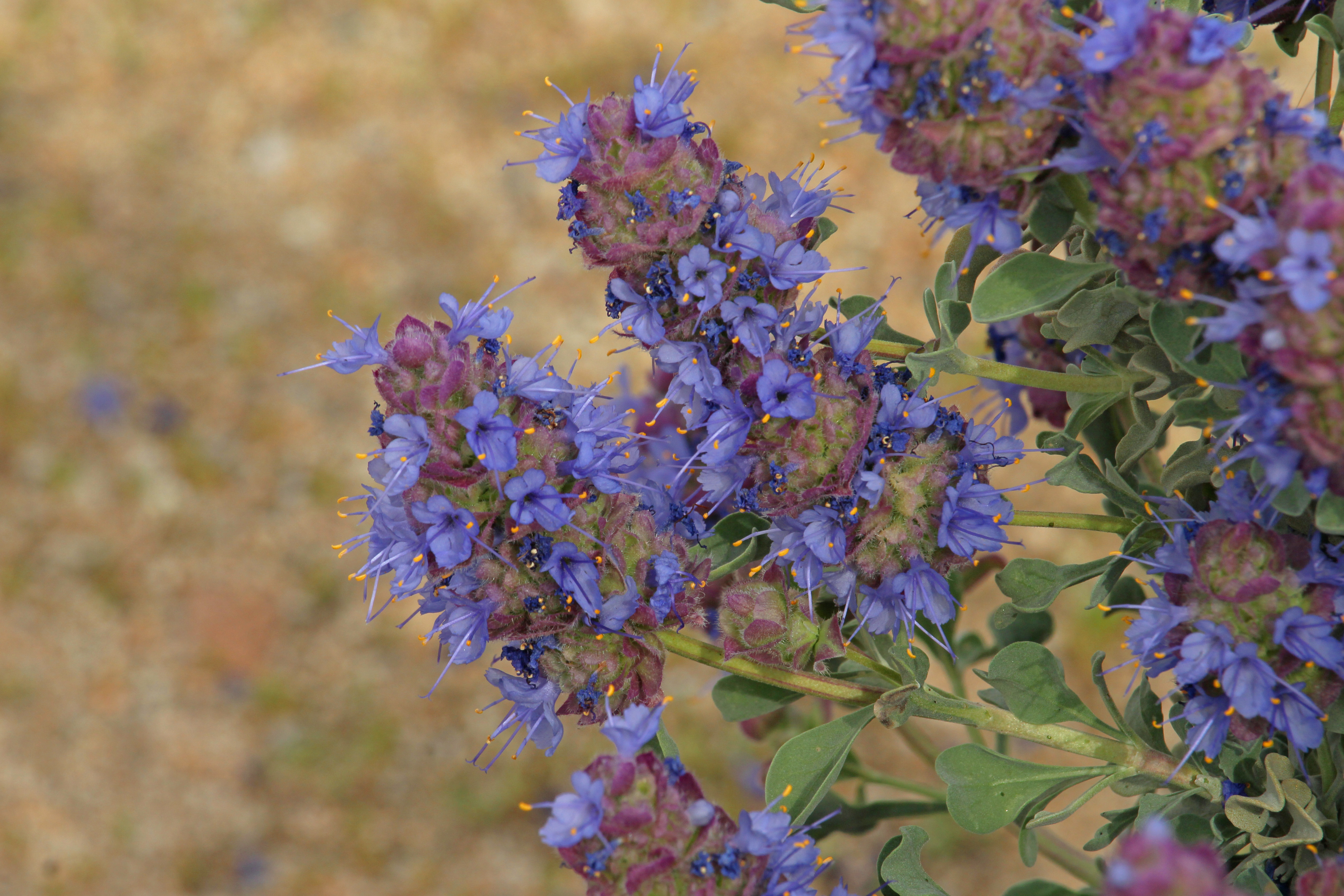
Salvia dorii var. pilosa in Antelope Valley, about 2,945 feet (900 m)

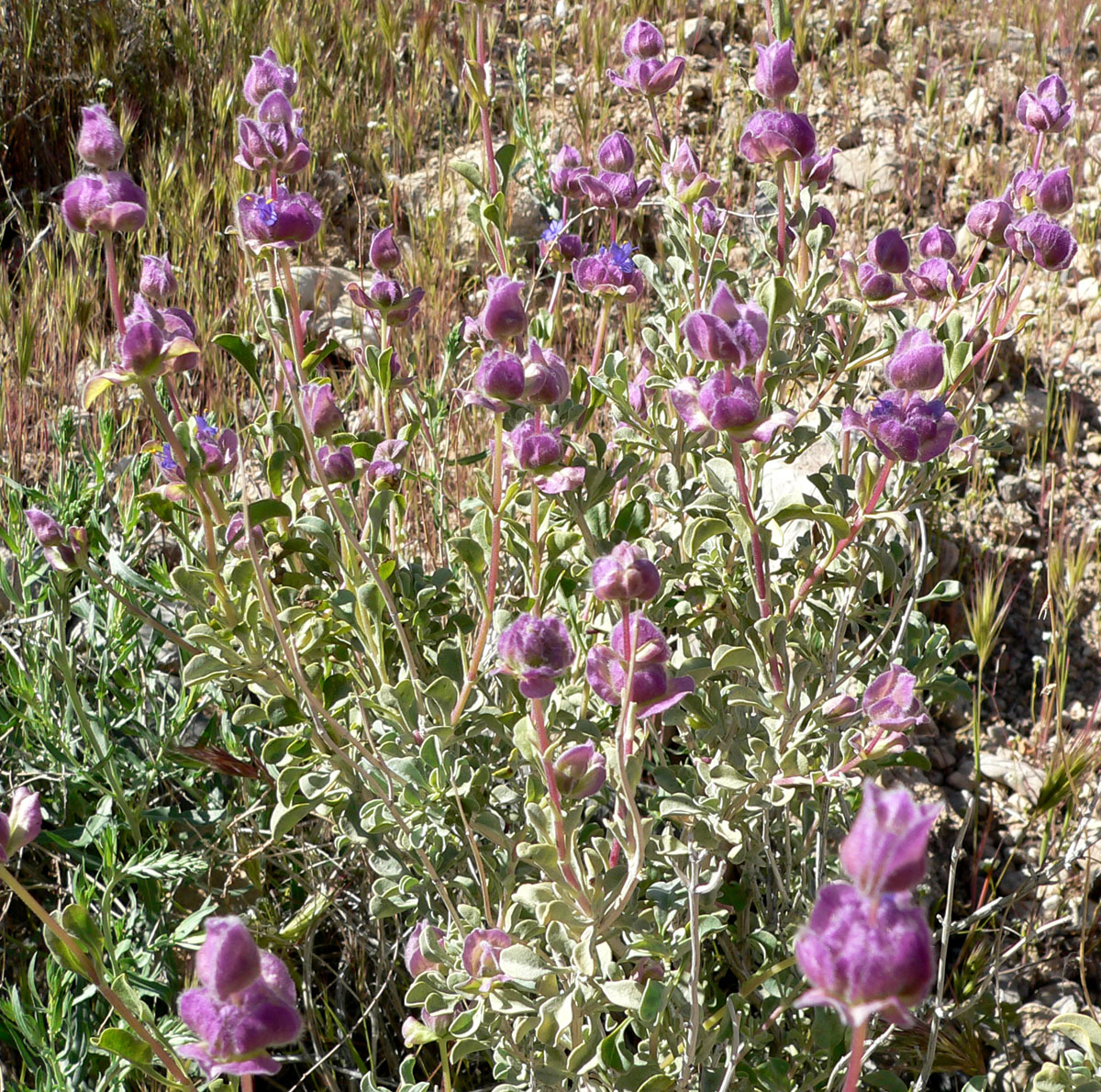
Salvia dorii in Red Rock Canyon National Conservation Area

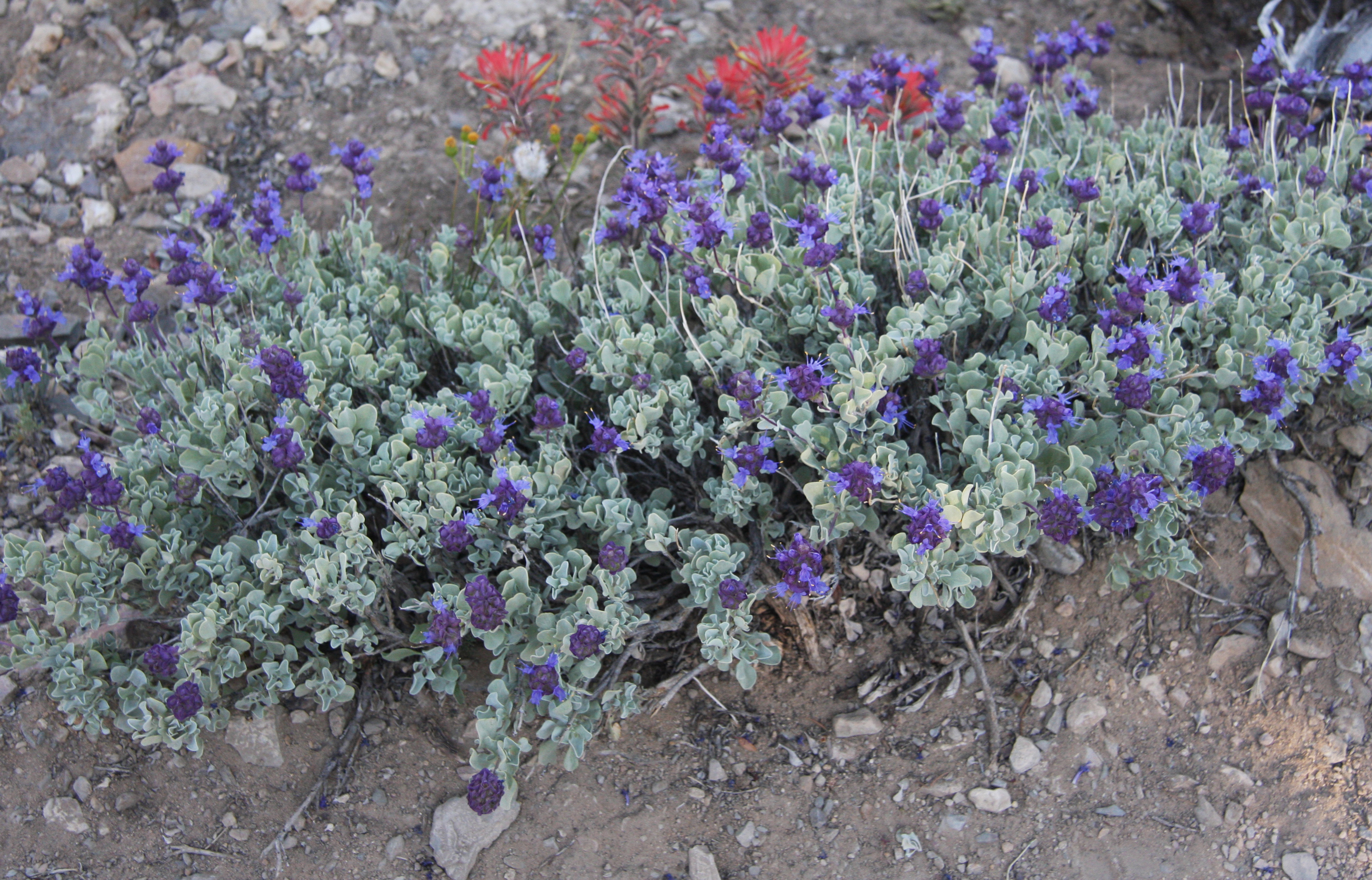
Salvia dorii in dry mountain habitat, about 10,000 feet (3,000 m)

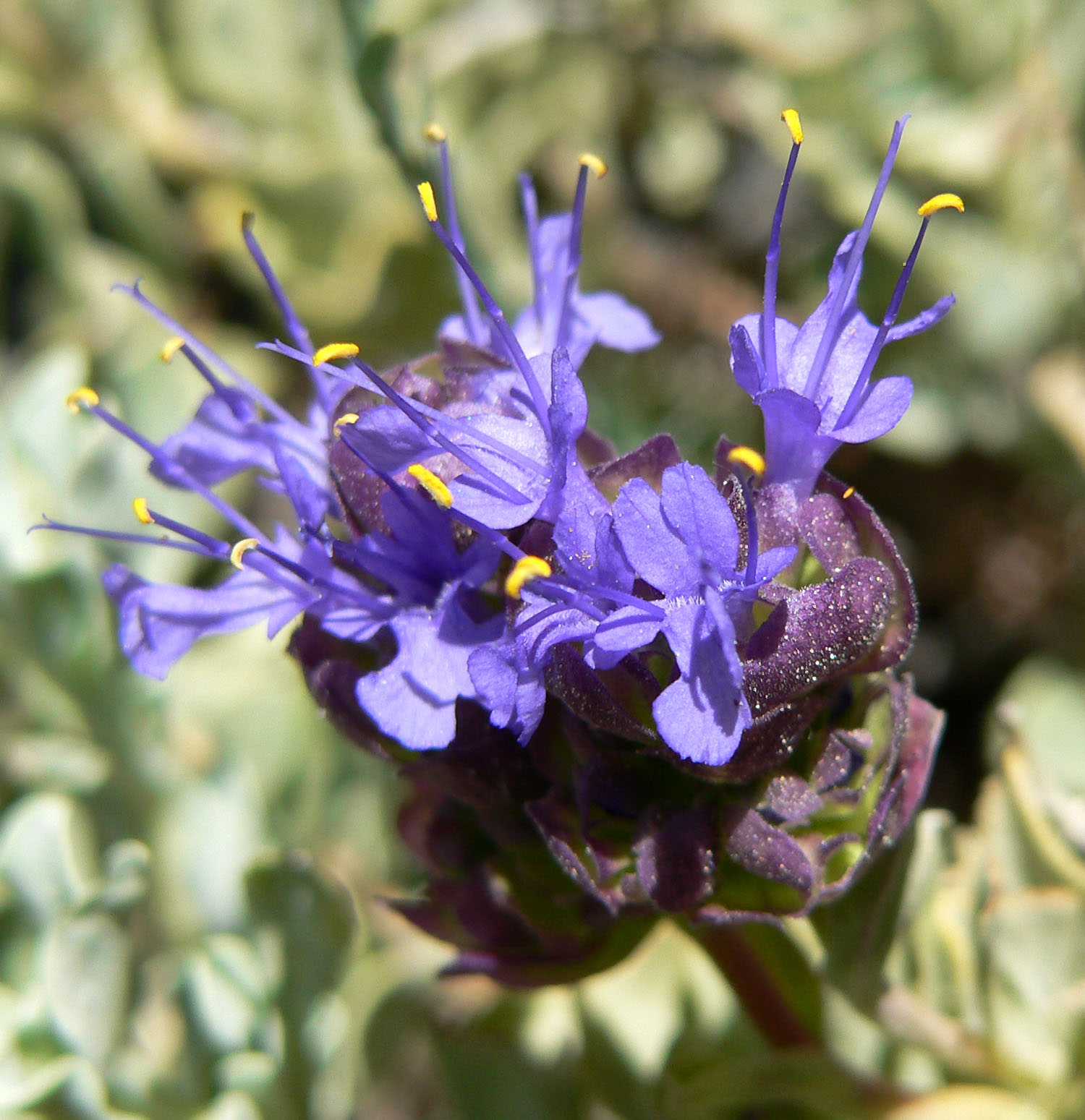
Salvia dorii var. clokeyi, about 8,600 feet (2,600 m)

== Chemistry ==
Some chemical components found in Salvia dorrii include salvidorol and two epimeric abietane diterpenes.
