= Le Départ des poilus, août 1914 =

Mural by Albert Herter

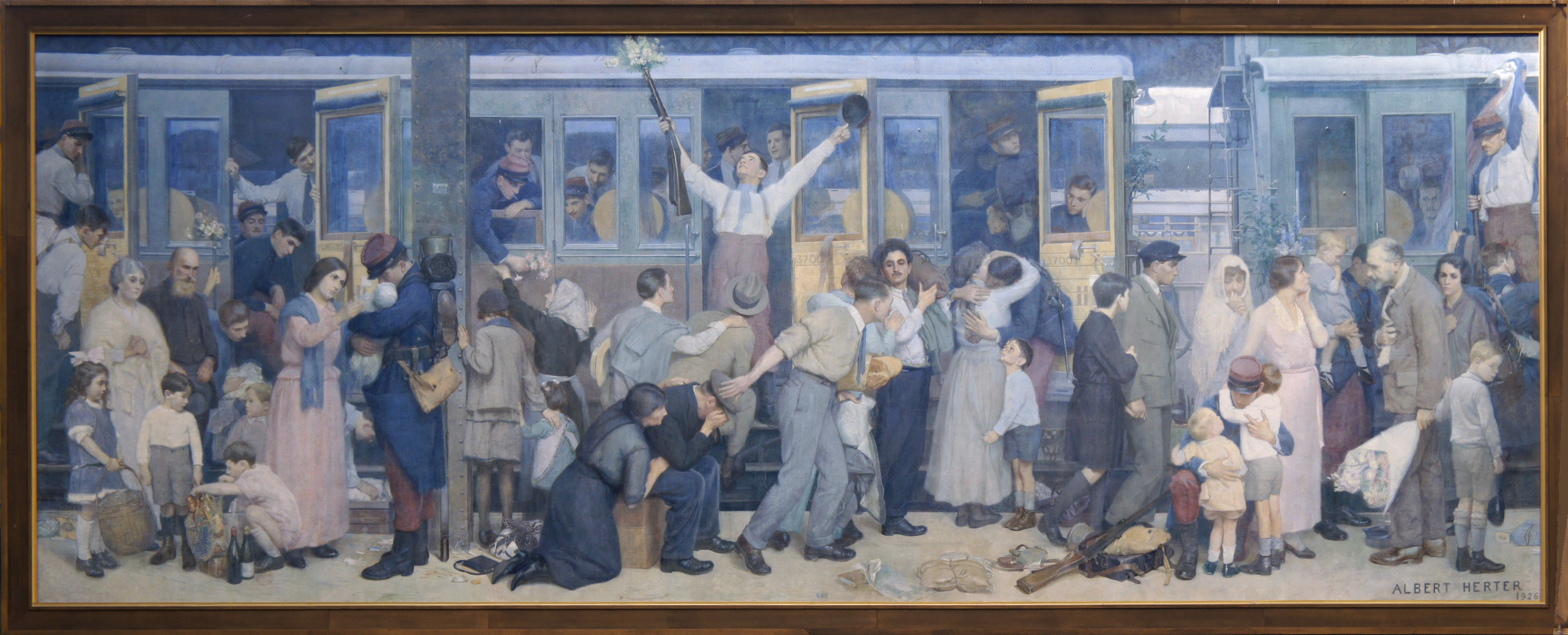
Le Départ des poilus, août 1914 (Departure of the Infantrymen, August 1914)

Le Départ des poilus, août 1914 (French: Departure of the Infantrymen, August 1914) is a monumental mural by the American artist Albert Herter. The painting measures 12 by 5 metres (39 ft × 16 ft) and is displayed at the Gare de l'Est railway station in Paris, where it is suspended some 7 metres (23 ft) high on a wall in the Hall d'Alsace.

Herter's work was intended as a memorial to his elder son Everit, also a painter, who volunteered to join the US Army in September 1917, some months after the US joined the First World War. Everit Herter joined the camouflage section of the United States Army Corps of Engineers. Sergeant Herter was killed in June 1918 near Château-Thierry in Aisne, while serving in France with the American Expeditionary Force, and is buried in the Aisne-Marne American Cemetery. He had spent time in Europe with his parents before the war, including a period studying at a secondary school in France.

Herter channelled his grief into this mural, which depicts many poilus (French infantrymen) leaving for the Western Front. Over 3 million French citizens were mobilised in the summer of 1914, and many left from this hall at the Gare de l'Est.

The upper half of the frieze shows young men in uniform on the train awaiting departure. One to the right carries the French tricolour, and the young man at centre, holding aloft his cap and a rifle with a bouquet of flowers, is a portrait of Everit. The lower half shows men, women and children saying their farewells. The man at far right with the bouquet of flowers is a self-portrait of Herter, and the woman in white at the far left is a portrait of Herter's wife Adele (née McGinnis).

The work was painted in 1925-26 at the Chateau de Versailles. Herter donated the mural to the people of France, and it was unveiled in the departure hall at the Gare de l'Est on 8 June 1926, in the presence of the former French Commander-in-Chief Marshal Joffre, the French Minister of War and former Prime Minister Paul Painlevé, the Minister of Arts Anatole de Monzie, and the US Ambassador to France Myron T. Herrick. At the same ceremony, Herter was awarded the Légion d'honneur.

The painting was removed from the Gare de l'Est in 1948, to be cleaned of the dirt deposited by years of smoke from steam trains. It returned in 1964, but was removed again in 2006 to allow the station to be adapted for the TGV Est. After restoration, it was reinstalled in early 2008 in the Hall d'Alsace.

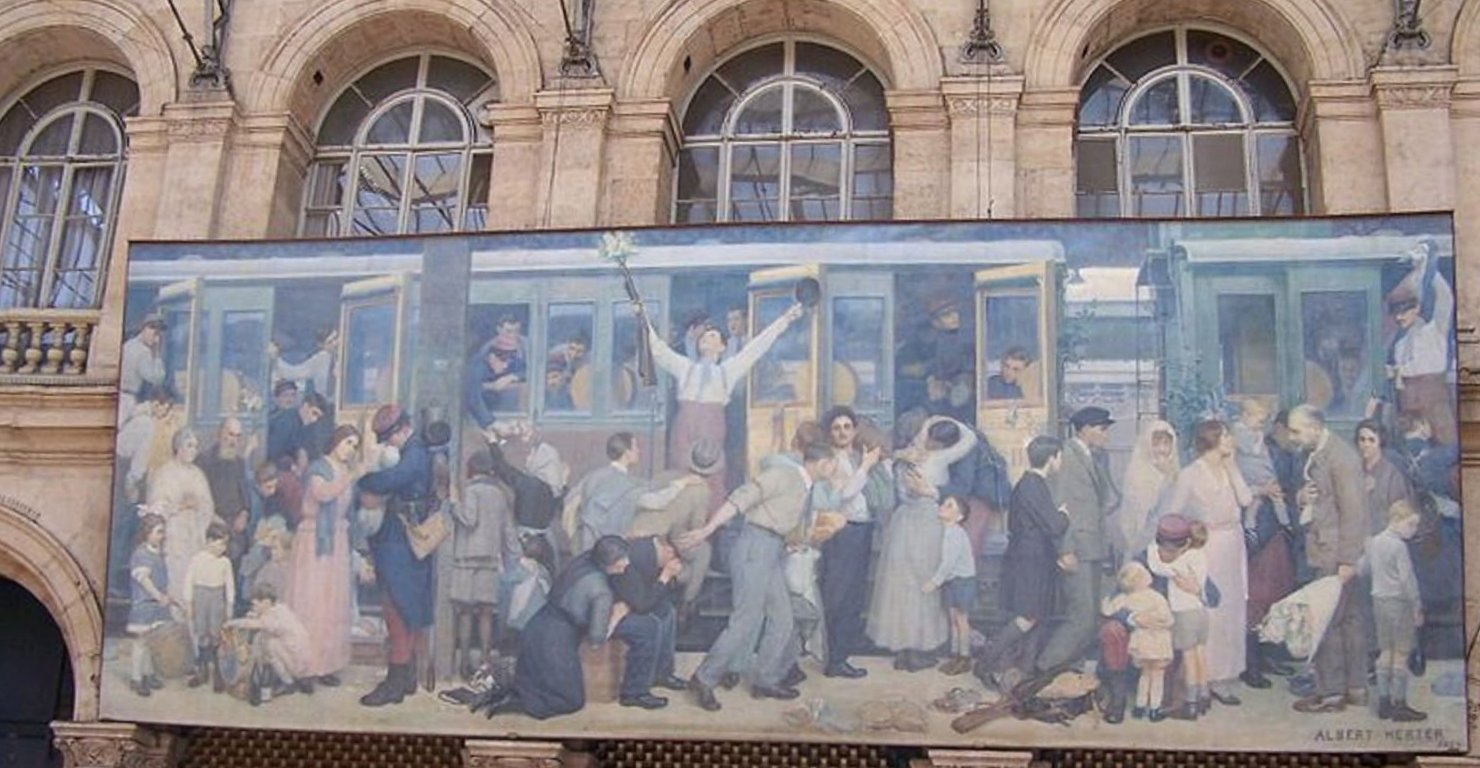
The painting in 2008

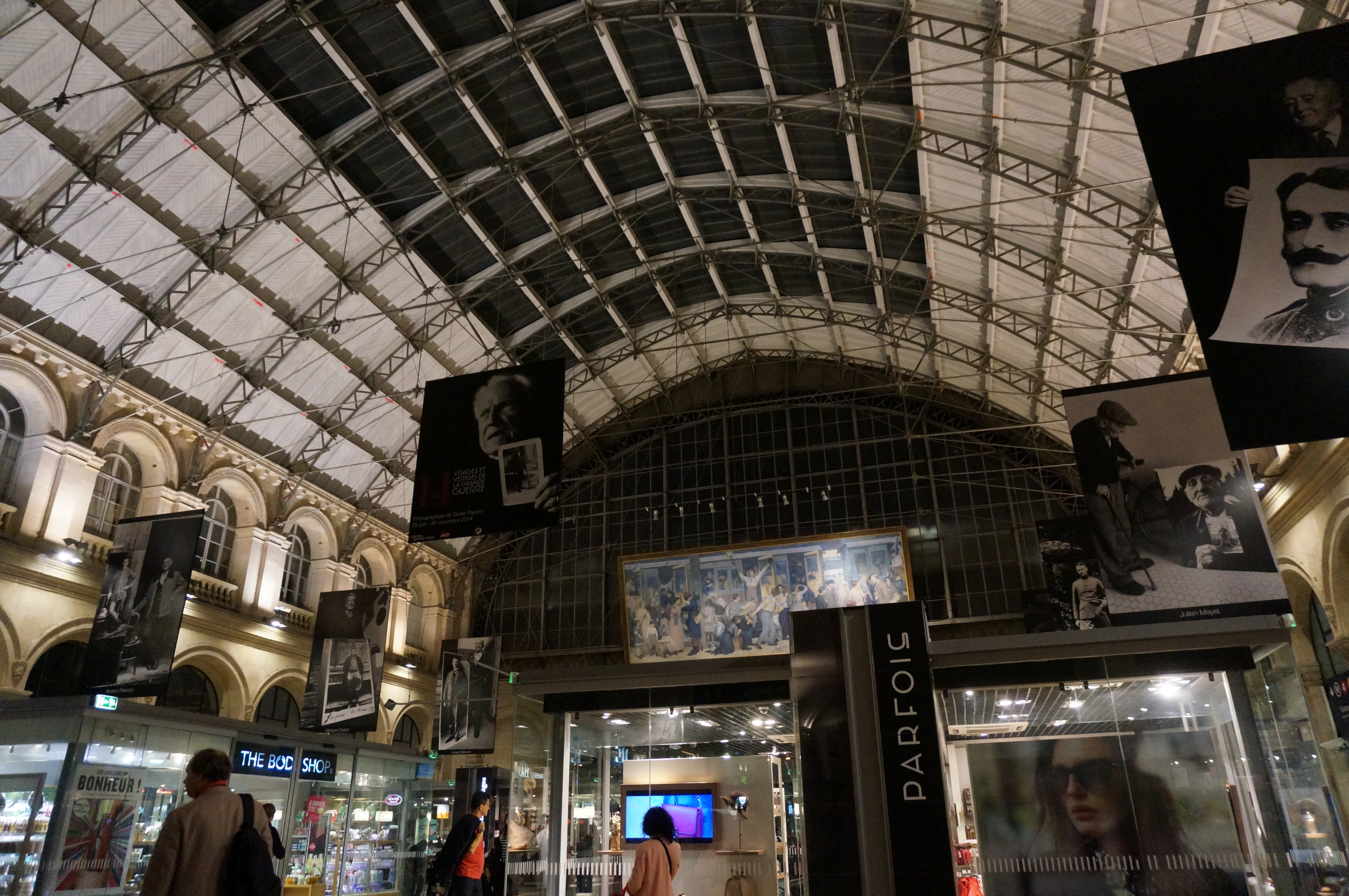
The painting in the Gare de l'Est in 2014

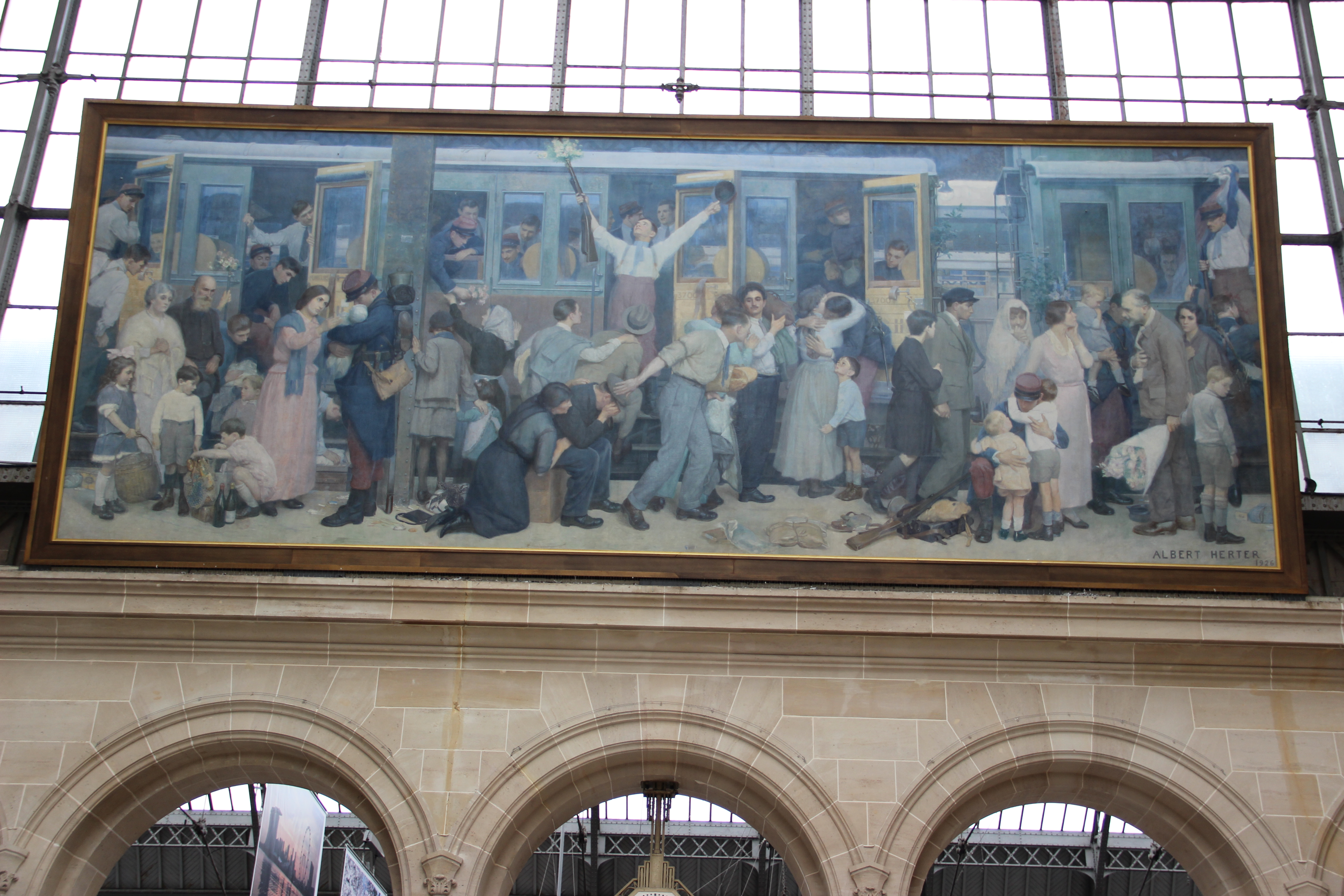
The painting in 2015
