= Alameda Park =

Park in Santa Barbara, California

Coordinates: 34.428839°N 119.705439°W

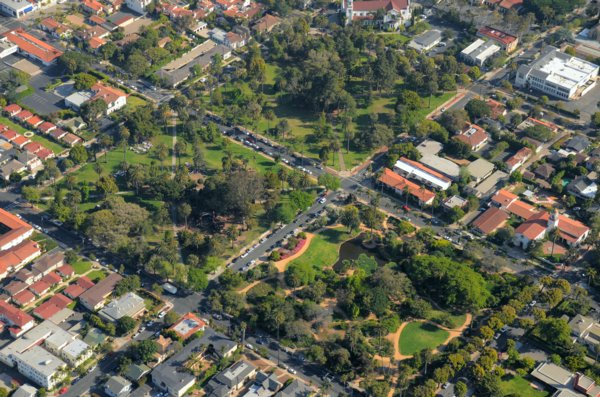
- Alameda Park complex (Alice Keck Park at bottom)
- Interactive map of Alameda Park
- Location: Santa Barbara, California
- Area: 9.3 acres (4 ha)
- Created: April 29, 1853
- Operator: City of Santa Barbara Parks & Recreation Department
- Website: Alameda Park

Alameda Park located in Santa Barbara, California, in the U.S., adjoining Alice Keck Park Memorial Gardens, is the location for many citywide celebrations, including Summer Solstice. It is also one of the city's oldest parks.

Occupying two blocks, Alameda Park is home to a gazebo as well as the 8,000-square-foot (740 m^{2}) Kids World playground. It also has many rare trees.

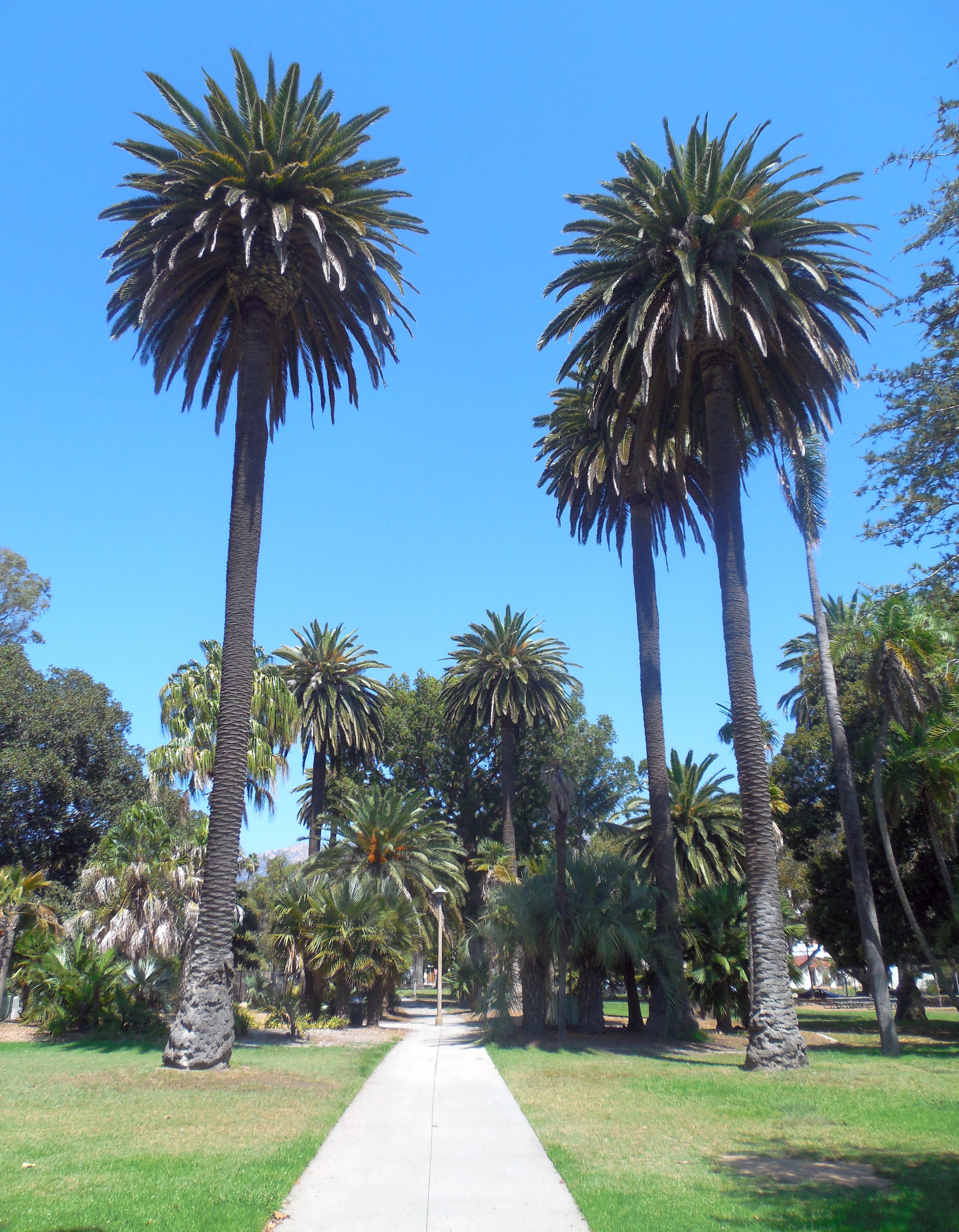
The Canary Island date palms in East Alameda Plaza are estimated to have been planted between 1910 and 1925.

== History ==
Set aside by a municipal ordinance on April 29, 1853, Plaza Alameda originally comprised blocks 88 and 89 between East Sola and East Victoria Streets, adjacent to the southeast of the park's present location (then codified as blocks 73 for the eastern plaza and 74 as the western plaza). However, an 1853 map of the City of Santa Barbara drawn by civil engineer Vitus Wackenreuder indicates six blocks as Garden de Alameda, which further include blocks 58 and 59 adjoining to the northwest between East Micheltorena and East Arrellaga Streets. What was indicated in the Wackenreuder map as block 58 is the present day site of Alice Keck Park Memorial Gardens. On March 15, 1868, an ordinance stated that blocks 73 and 74 should compose Plaza Alameda. In April of that year, block 88 was sold to Antonio Arrellanes and on July 13, block 89 was sold to Emanuel R. Den. Ordinance 47 hence revoked the dedication of blocks 88 and 89 for public use.

In 1874, picket fences were installed around the plazas and trees were planted within the park; however it was quickly overrun by weeds. A Park Board was formed in the early 1880s. In 1888, a petition was granted to erect a band or music stand in the park to cost not less than $250, along with a tool house that would cost $250.

In 1909, Charles Mulford Robinson stated that Alameda had a: "high order of merit." Parks Superintendent, Dr. Augustus Boyd Doremus (1842-1937) personally planted countless trees and shrubs for which the park remains famous today. A plaque was erected in 1929 in his honor, which is located at the northeastern corner of East Sola and Santa Barbara Streets.

In 1985, 29-year-old Michael Stephenson was murdered in the park gazebo. Stephenson, homeless at the time, was sleeping on the gazebo platform when he was attacked and stabbed to death by two students of a nearby private school.
