= Alice Keck Park Memorial Garden =

Park in California, United States

Coordinates: 34.428347°N 119.705983°W

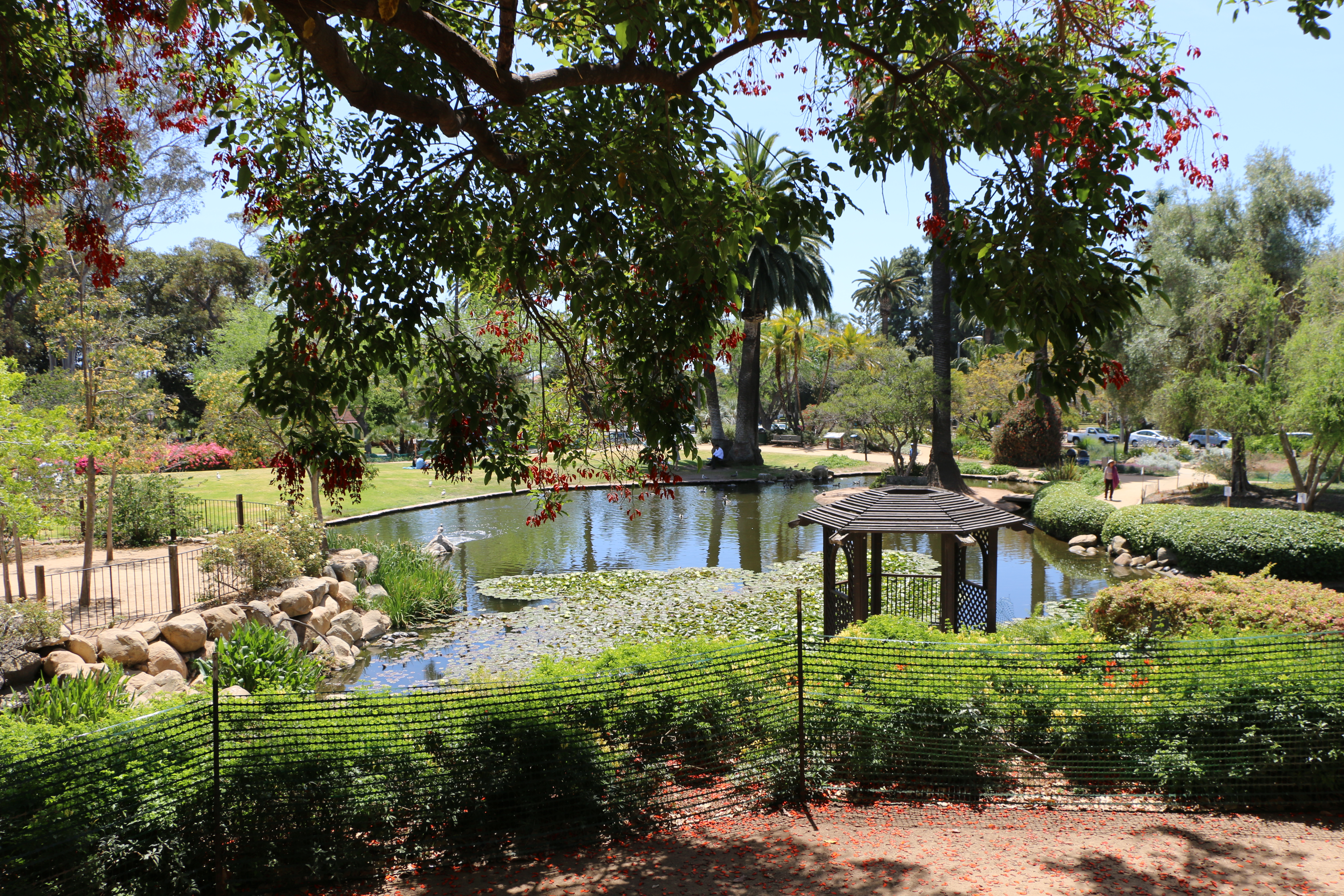
Alice Keck Park Memorial Garden, view of the Koi Pond and gazebo

Alice Keck Park Memorial Garden is a park located in Santa Barbara, California. It consists of one entire city block, bounded by Santa Barbara, Micheltorena, Garden and Arrellaga Streets. It is across Santa Barbara Street from the Unitarian Society of Santa Barbara, and across Micheltorena Street from Alameda Park. The park was designed by well known landscape architect, Grant Castleberg ASLA.

The property, formerly the site of artist Albert Herter's El Mirasol Hotel (demolished 1960s), was purchased and donated to the city in 1975. The anonymous gift included funds for the land's conversion into gardens, and an endowment for their maintenance. The donor's identity remained a mystery until her death, two years later, when it was revealed to have been Alice Keck Park (1918–1977). Park was the daughter of William Myron Keck, the founder of Superior Oil Company. Park had a family connection to the Herters and the site – W. M. Keck's sister Caroline (Alice's aunt) had been the widow of Herter's son Everit, who died in World War I. The City dedicated the gardens in 1980, and named them in Park's honor.

Grant Castleberg produced a visionary landscape that is filled with color and motion. Elizabeth de Forest, a member of the Santa Barbara Botanic Garden board was tasked with making sure Alice Keck Park's wishes were adhered to. Castleberg shared Elizabeth's and Alice's vision of the park “as a place that will be of interest not only to horticulturists but to all those who seek quiet spots of beauty". His design created restful green areas highlighted with spots of bright color throughout the year for the enjoyment of the public. A gurgling stream passes under a rustic bridge, while a large sundial formed of stone and brick formed the floor of one of the highest hill. (The sundial had to be removed due to vandalism). The garden features a man-made pond stocked with turtles and koi, as well as a gazebo and many meandering walkways and paths. All the plants in the garden, some native and some ornamental, are chosen specifically to be tolerant of the low-water nature of the Santa Barbara climate. In addition, there is an area regarded as a sensory garden for the visually impaired.

The Arbor Area of Alice Keck Park Memorial Garden can be rented for events, such as weddings.
