= Century Club of Scranton =

- U.S. National Register of Historic Places
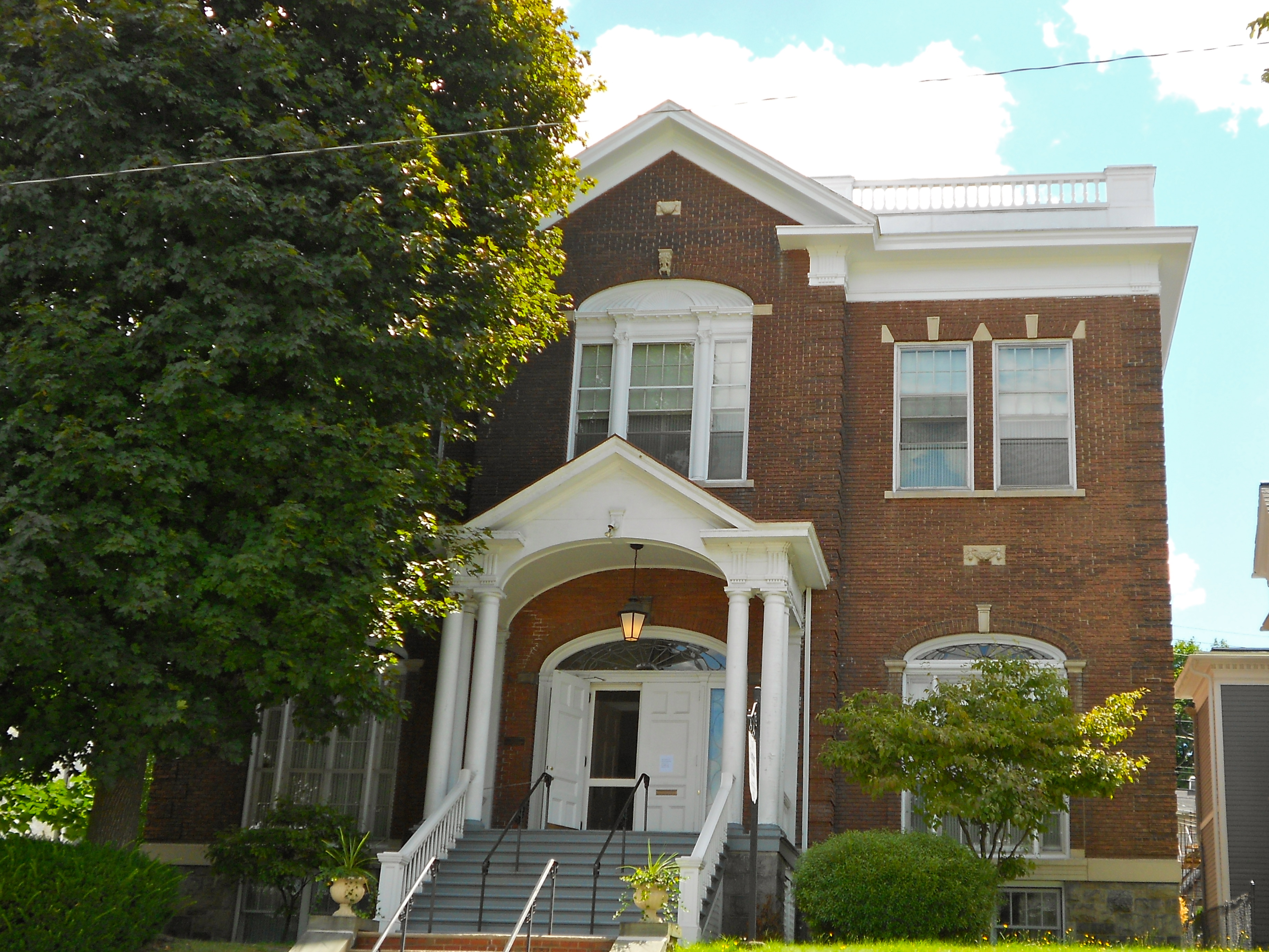

- Location within Pennsylvania Location within the United States
- Location: 612 Jefferson Ave., Scranton, Pennsylvania
- Coordinates: 41°24′42″N 75°39′21″W
- Area: less than one acre
- Built: 1913-1914
- Architect: Blackwood, Harvey J.; Nelson, John
- Architectural style: Colonial Revival
- NRHP reference No.: 96000323
- Added to NRHP: March 28, 1996

Century Club of Scranton is a historic women's club located at Scranton, Lackawanna County, Pennsylvania. It was built in 1913-1914, and is a three-story, rectangular, brick, limestone and wood building in the Colonial Revival-style. It measures 56 feet, 6 inches, by 92 feet, 4 inches, and has a flat roof and three bay symmetrical facade. It features an entry portico supported by groupings of three Doric order columns at the two front corners.

It was added to the National Register of Historic Places in 1996.

== See also ==
- Scranton Club
