= Music of Annapolis =

Overview of music in Annapolis, Maryland

The music of Annapolis, Maryland, played a major role in the music history of the United States during the colonial era and has since produced a number of notable musical institutions and groups.

== Early music ==
In the 1710s in the colonial United States, a number of singing schools arose, beginning in New England and spreading into Maryland by 1764, beginning in Annapolis. These singing schools met in the evenings, with a singing master leading the education of both youth and adults in the basics of musical performance, including note-reading and part-singing, and the particulars of Christian hymns. Most singing masters were educated only in other singing schools, and not in any sort of formal music education. Many singing masters were itinerant travelers.

Though Annapolis was the first town in Maryland to be home to a singing school, they became common, first in Baltimore and then throughout the state, after the Revolutionary War. The first was at St. Anne's Anglican Church in Annapolis, in 1764, led by singing master Phillip Williams, who taught psalmody in four parts. Though Williams, being itinerant, left Annapolis after only one year, he was replaced by a new singing master, Hugh Maguire, the following year.

After the Revolutionary War, singing school activities began diminishing throughout Maryland, including Annapolis. The only noted singing master during this time was Alexander Gray, in 1786, and possibly for some time thereafter.

=== Tuesday Club ===
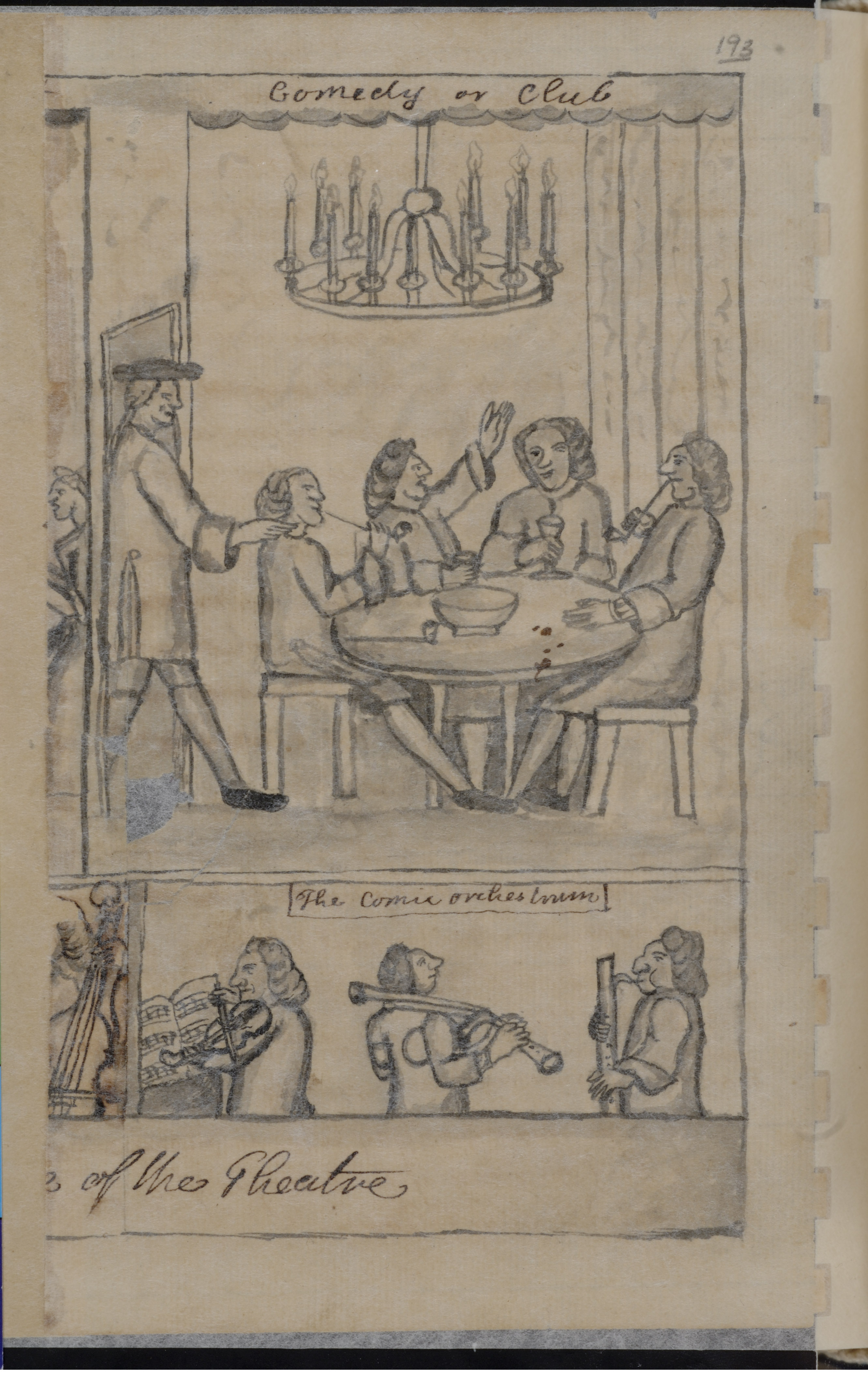
Caricature featuring the Tuesday Club's comic orchestra from The history of the ancient and honorable Tuesday club, ca 1755. From the collection at the John Work Garrett Library.

During the colonial era, Annapolis was one of the larger cities in North America, and was home to an organization called the Tuesday Club, which documented musical activity in the city in more detail than any other record of its kind. The club was founded in 1745 by Alexander Hamilton in imitation of similar clubs in Edinburgh, specifically the Whin-Bush Club. Music was not initially the major focus of the group, but it soon came to specialize in musical activities at biweekly meetings known as sederunts. Both original vocal and instrumental material and published compositions were a part of the Tuesday Club's repertoire, including Scottish and English folksongs, and English theatrical pieces. Among the club's members was Jonas Green, printer of the Maryland Gazette and publisher of music books, and Thomas Bacon, the club's most renowned composer whose works were very much in the European model. No compositions from the club gained significant acclaim outside of the city.

The music of the Tuesday Club was expressly and purposely European in character, as the members wished to emulate the acknowledged masters of the Western classical music tradition. However, unlike classical music, performances were recreational in nature rather than artistic, the music composed by members of the Club being entirely casual, and probably never intended for outside consumption. The corpus of the club's output constitutes the earliest known American secular music. Instrumentation included the French horn, flute, cello, viola and harpsichord.

== Popular music ==
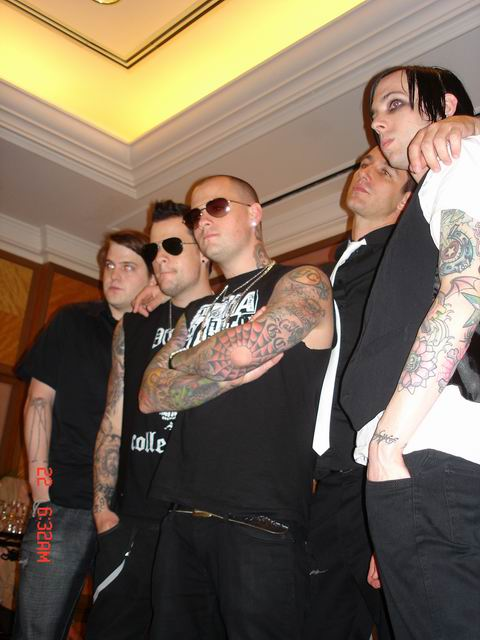
The band Good Charlotte, originally from nearby Waldorf, moved to Annapolis in 1998

In the 1980s, Annapolis was home to two of the most important early emo bands, Moss Icon and The Hated, both of whom recorded for the prominent local Vermin Scum record label. Vermin Scum also released records by Black Dice, Breathing Walker and the Universal Order of Armageddon. Annapolis has also been home to the funk rock band Jimmie's Chicken Shack, SHAED (formerly known as The Walking Sticks) and the band Good Charlotte.

== Institutions ==
=== Naval Academy ===
The United States Naval Academy Band, the longest-lasting music group in the United States Navy and the third-oldest active-duty military band in the country, was founded in 1852, though the history of instrumental music at the Academy can be traced back to its founding in 1852. John Jarvis, a drummer, and William Bealer, a fifer, are the best-remembered servicemen from the Band's early years, though the first Marine Musicians to serve were named Tommy Diggins and William Hoeke. Musicians with the band performed calls, like tattoo and reveille. When the Band was officially funded in 1852, bandmaster and performer John Philip Pfeiffer selected the first musicians, who performed their first concert in 1853 for the Secretary of the Navy. During the Civil War, the Band's musicians were deployed, while the Academy was temporarily transferred to Newport, Rhode Island, returning in 1865. At the end of the War, band members were transferred to the civil personnel of the Academy, as opposed to drawing pay as a member of the Navy. With this shift, performers' pay decreased, and the difference was made up by charging midshipmen and officers at the Academy a monthly fee. Soon after, Superintendent David Dixon Porter modernized and professionalized the Band, expanding its size and providing attractive uniforms. In the 1880s, woodwind instruments were added to the Band, which had previously been exclusively brass; new instruments included clarinets, oboes and piccolos. The youngest bandmaster in the organization's history, Charles Adams Zimmerman, took office in 1887, and is known for establishing a theatrical group and becoming very popular among the cadets at the Academy.

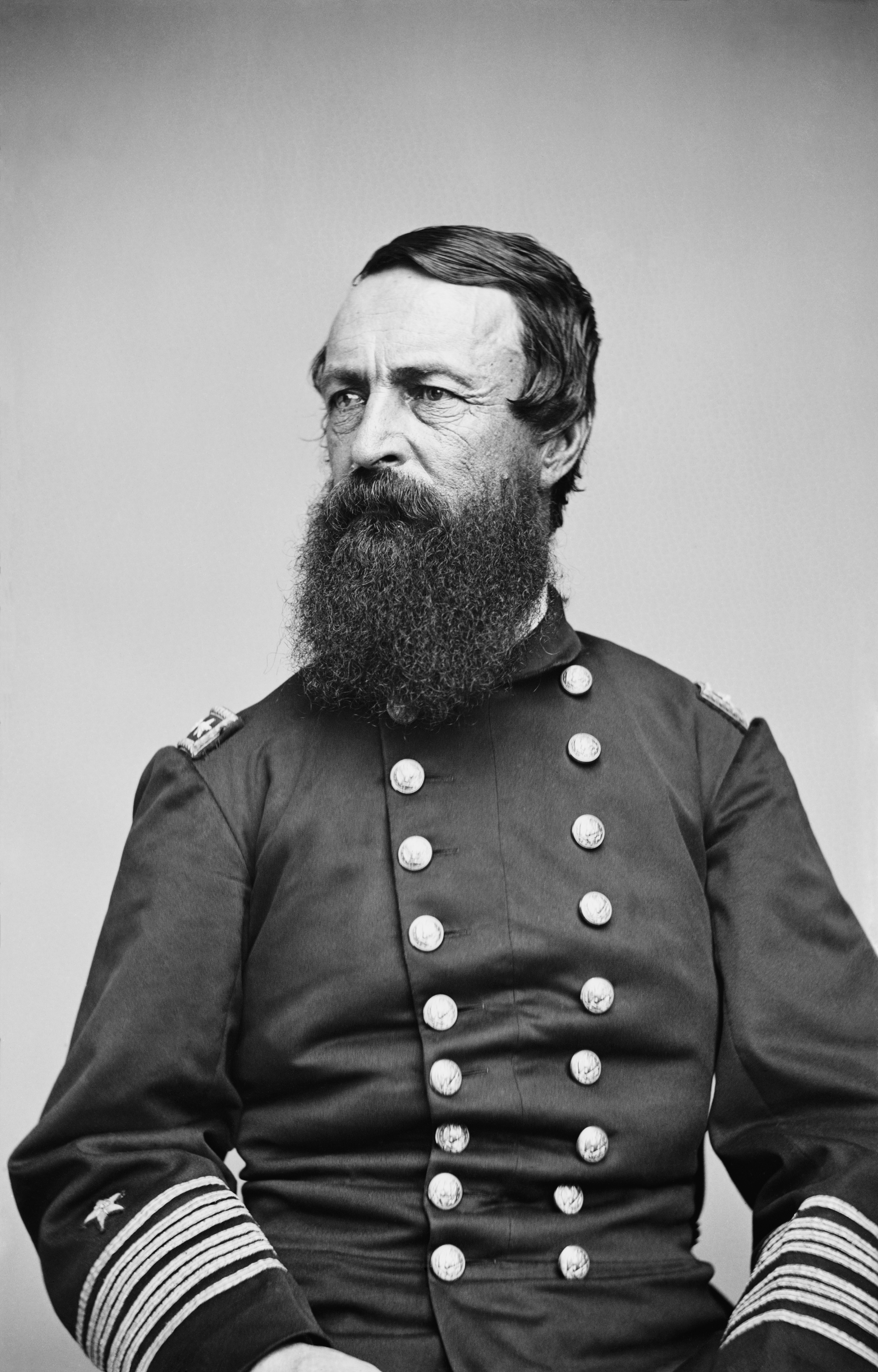
David Dixon Porter, Superintendent of the Academy, modernized the Band.

In 1894, the uniform of the United States Marines Corp Band was prescribed for the Naval Academy Band, and wore that uniform until 1925. Zimmerman remained the bandmaster even after being offered the more prestigious position with the Marine Corps Band in 1897, and is perhaps best known for composing "Anchors Aweigh" in 1907, intending it to be an inspiring and timeless piece of music that could be used as a football marching song. Under Zimmerman's successor, Adolph Torovsky, the Academy Band made its first commercial recording, in 1920, using Zimmerman's "Anchors' Aweigh", and one of Torovsky's own pieces, "March of the Middies". In 1939, the Band began performing on Maryland radio stations and represented that state at the World Fair, while the director, Lieutenant Sima, composed the "Victory March", one of the most well-known and popular pieces produced at the Academy. Under Alexander Cecil Morris in the middle of the 20th century, the Academy Band performed on television for the first time, established a weekly radio show and acquired entirely new instruments and facilities.

In the 1970s, under bandmaster Ned E. Muffley integrated women into the Naval Academy's music program, while the Academy's first rock band, Tidal Wave, also saw some national success. His successor, William J. Phillips, established lush, thematic performances featuring largely original compositions; the changes attracted new audiences and the Academy Band became internationally renowned. In 1973, Gayle Slayter was recruited for the Band, becoming known as the "Naval Academy's First Lady of Song" over the course of her twenty-year career.

The Naval Academy Band also encompasses a brass quintet, wind quintet, marching band and other units. The Academy is also home to a number of other noted music groups.

=== Naval Academy Department of Musical Activities ===
Over the course of more than a century, the Naval Academy Music Department has had just four civilian musical directors. J.W. Crosley, who in 1923 composed the music to Navy Blue and Gold, the Naval Academy alma mater, was followed in 1943 as Organist/Choirmaster by Donald C. Gilley who established the hugely popular annual performance of Handel’s Messiah. In 1972, Dr. John Barry Talley took over the reins as Director of Musical Activities, a position he held until his retirement in 2006. Under Dr. Talley’s leadership, the Academy’s music program grew to international stature. Talley was succeeded by Dr. Aaron Smith.

The United States Naval Academy Department of Musical Activities involves over one thousand midshipmen (students) who participate in a number of ensembles: Men’s and Women’s Glee Clubs, three Chapel Choirs, the Drum and Bugle Corps, Pipes and Drums ensemble, Symphony Orchestra, a music theatre program, and several smaller ensembles. Many of these groups tour extensively throughout America and abroad, performing in major concert halls and with professional symphony orchestras. They have been featured on “The Today Show,” “Good Morning America,” “CBS Morning Show,” and have appeared in several nationally televised broadcasts of the “Kennedy Center Honors,” and a 20-year run on NBC/TNT’s “Christmas in Washington.” The Naval Academy also hosts a Distinguished Artists Series that presents world-class performers to the Brigade of Midshipmen and the general public on the stage of Alumni Hall. Among the most popular presentations in Annapolis are the annual Halloween Organ Concert, featuring Chapel Organist Monte Maxwell and a cast of one hundred midshipmen, the Christmas Messiah program and the spring Glee Club musical, a fully staged and costumed Broadway musical; all these events draw capacity audiences exceeding 4000 patrons. The Naval Academy Chapel Organ is one of the country's major instruments. Monte Maxwell serves as principal chapel organist. He was preceded by organist James A. Dale.

=== Annapolis Chorale ===
The Annapolis Chorale is a nonprofit organization whose programs include a Chamber Chorus, Chamber Orchestra and the Annapolis Youth Chorus; programs include both Western classical and semi-classical music, as well as educational and scholarship initiatives. The Chorale was founded in 1974 by James A. Dale, Assistant Director of Musical Activities at the United States Naval Academy. From 1976 to 1978, Mark Tardue led the Chorale to new growth and organized a 1977 sold-out concert that became critically acclaimed and greatly assisted the Chorale's reputation. J. Ernest Green was selected as music director and conductor in 1984, and he serves as of 2008, having becoming the longest-serving person in that position in the organization's history.

=== Annapolis Symphony Orchestra ===
The Annapolis Symphony Orchestra, founded in 1962, is a well-known organization that has hosted guests like Cuban violinist Guillermo Perch and Charlie Byrd; the Annapolis Orchestra inspired composer David Ott to create the Annapolis Overture, which debuted in 1995.

=== The Sons of the Severn ===
The Sons of the Severn is a non-profit men's choral ensemble founded in Annapolis in 1949. The chorus represents the Anne Arundel County, MD Chapter of the Barbershop Harmony Society (SPEBSQSA, Inc), and won the 2010 Western Division Chorus Championship in the Society's Mid-Atlantic District. The Sons of the Severn chorus performs all year throughout Annapolis, Anne Arundel County, and the surrounding areas. Notable venues include the Maryland Statehouse, Oriole Park at Camden Yards, Loews Annapolis Hotel, and Annapolis City Hall. T. J. Barranger has served as the group's director since February 2005, and has directed the chorus to six consecutive appearances at the Mid-Atlantic District chorus finals competition. The Sons of the Severn chorus is an active supporter of charitable endeavors in Anne Arundel County, MD, including the North County Emergency Outreach Network, and music education programs in Anne Arundel County high schools.

=== Other institutions ===
Annapolis also home to the Annapolis Opera and the Ballet Theatre of Maryland. The Annapolis Opera was founded in 1972, and hosts year-round musical programs and contests. The Annapolis Maritime Museum sponsors the Chesapeake Music Institute, an organization founded to promote traditional music associated with the Chesapeake Bay.

== Venues and festivals ==
In modern Annapolis, three music venues are notable for blues and jazz, namely the King of France Tavern in the Maryland Inn and the Ebb Tide near the Chesapeake Bay Bridge. The Maryland Hall for the Creative Arts is another major local venue, hosting numerous renowned performing groups throughout the year. It was founded in 1979.

On November 1, 1997 Rams Head On Stage hosted Livingston Taylor, the first concert of nearly 8,000 shows and counting for the venue. In their 27 years, Rams Head has entertained over 1.5 million concert goers and continues to bring national entertainers to the city of Annapolis, hosting more than 400 shows a year. In 2012, Rams Head On Stage was named the Top Club Under 500 Seats in the World by Pollstar Magazine. Rams Head also produced the Silopanna Music Festival in 2014 featuring artists The Flaming Lips, Dashboard Confessional, Matt & Kim, and Eric Hutchinson.

The Annapolis Music Fest was first held in June 2002, which hosts both touring and local bands in a variety of styles of rock and hip hop.

Founded in 1997 by James Borchelt, Eastport-A-Rockin' is an Annapolis music festival featuring local and national artists on 4 stages. Traditionally held the last weekend of June on the grounds of the Annapolis Maritime Museum, it is the longest current running music festival within the city, with previous performers including Good Charlotte, Jimmie's Chicken Shack and SHAED (as The Walking Sticks).

== See also ==
- Music of Maryland
- List of Maryland music groups
