= State Street (Santa Barbara) =

Main street of Santa Barbara, California

- Upper State Street (north of Mission Street)
- Maintained by: City of Santa Barbara
- Length: 4.9 miles (7.9 km)
- Location: Santa Barbara, California
- Coordinates: 34°25′15″N 119°41′54″W
- From: Stearns Wharf
- To: Continues as Hollister Avenue west of California State Route 154

Other
- Known for: State Street Promenade, Spanish Colonial Revival architecture, downtown theatres

State Street is the principal commercial street of Santa Barbara, California. It runs inland from Stearns Wharf and the waterfront at Cabrillo Boulevard, through the historic downtown, and northwest through the "Upper State" commercial district. Starting just of California State Route 154 at Modoc Road it continues as Hollister Avenue toward Goleta. The street was laid out in the 1851 survey of the city and named for California's admission to the Union. Most of its downtown portion was destroyed in the 1925 Santa Barbara earthquake. The rebuilt street, in a mostly Spanish Colonial Revival style, became the model for the city's architectural review system. Since 2020 the central downtown blocks have been closed to motor vehicles as the State Street Promenade.

== History ==
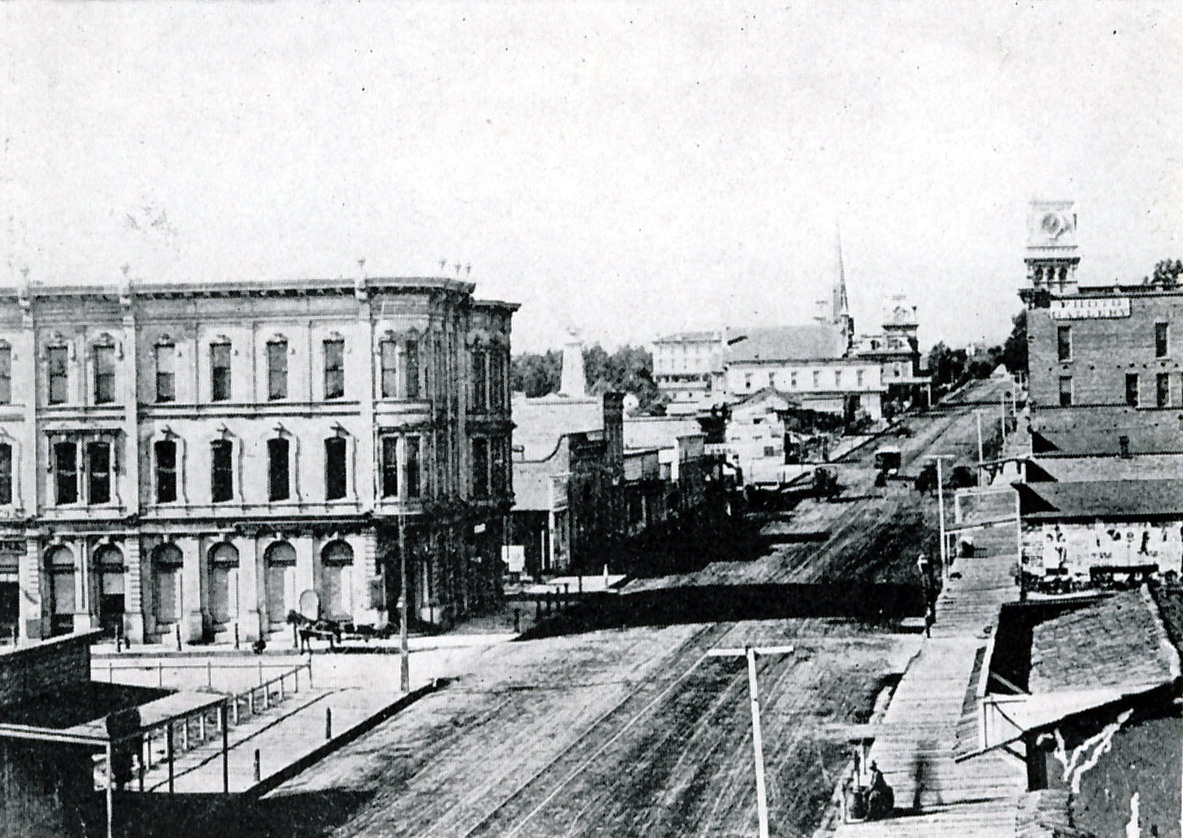
State Street as seen in the 1880s, kooking north from Canon Perdido Street. The buildings in this picture are from left to right: First National Gold Bank, rear of Arlington Hotel, Presbyterian Church, Ellwood Hotel, Cook's Building.

=== Survey and naming ===
After California became a state, the Santa Barbara Common Council hired surveyor Salisbury Haley, who began a survey of the town early in 1851. In February 1851 the council appointed a committee to name the new streets. Antonio María de la Guerra and Judge Joaquín Carrillo are named as members in some accounts. Most of the names chosen were Spanish, because most of the town's people spoke Spanish and official records were then kept in that language. State Street, however, was named for California's admission as a state in 1850. The Haley survey made State Street one of only two 80-foot (24 m) streets in the town grid. A map of the city as surveyed in 1853 is held by California State Parks.

=== Wharf, railways and the Arlington Hotel ===
In 1867, lumberman John Peck Stearns opened a lumberyard at the foot of State Street. In 1872 he completed Stearns Wharf, with financial help from William Welles Hollister. At the time it was the longest deep-water pier between Los Angeles and San Francisco.

In 1875 the Santa Barbara Street Railway opened a narrow-gauge mule-drawn line on State Street. It ran from the waterfront to the new Arlington Hotel at Victoria Street. The Southern Pacific line from Los Angeles reached Santa Barbara in 1887, and the street railway system grew outward from State Street. Two rival companies merged in September 1896, ending a dispute over rights-of-way on State Street. The first electric streetcars ran on October 1, 1896, a change noted by the Daily News under the headline "Adios La Mula". The system never recovered from the 1925 earthquake and the rise of the automobile. It closed on June 30, 1929.

The Southern Pacific depot at 209 State Street was built in 1905 in the Mission Revival style. It still serves Amtrak's Coast Starlight and Pacific Surfliner as Santa Barbara station and was listed on the National Register of Historic Places (NRHP) on August 2, 2006.

=== 1925 earthquake and reconstruction ===
The 1925 Santa Barbara earthquake struck at 6:44 a.m. on June 29, 1925 killing 13 people and destroying most of the commercial district along State Street. Only a few buildings on the street remained standing. Before the quake, the Santa Barbara Community Arts Association had been campaigning for a unified Hispanic-inspired look for the city. Its members saw the rebuilding as a chance to make that happen. Under emergency powers, the city adopted an ordinance creating a board of review for the design of new buildings. An account of the ordinance appeared in The American Architect in July 1926, which also reported that a later city council repealed it. Even so, most of the commercial blocks rebuilt in the late 1920s used white stucco walls, red clay tile roofs, arcades and enclosed courtyard paseos.

=== Landmark district ===
In 1960 the city created the El Pueblo Viejo Landmark District, centered on State Street in the downtown core. It also formed an Advisory Landmark Committee to review designs in the district. That committee was the forerunner of today's Historic Landmarks Commission. Exterior changes to buildings in the district remain subject to the El Pueblo Viejo design guidelines.

=== Paseo Nuevo ===
In 1990 the Redevelopment Agency of the City of Santa Barbara opened Paseo Nuevo, an open-air shopping center designed by John Field. It covers two city blocks off the 600 and 700 blocks of State Street. Its original anchor stores were Nordstrom and The Broadway, which became a Macy's in 1996. Macy's closed in 2017. Nordstrom announced in May 2020 that it would not reopen its Paseo Nuevo store, which had been closed since March of that year during the COVID-19 pandemic. In June 2026 the City Council approved the sale of the center to Yardi Systems. Yardi plans to convert the former Macy's building into a corporate office.

=== State Street Promenade ===
Seen in August 2023 this photo of State Street shows the roadblocks in place that closed the street to through traffice starting in 2020.

In 2020, during the COVID-19 pandemic, state public health orders banned indoor dining. The City Council responded by closing several downtown blocks of State Street to vehicles under an emergency ordinance and allowing restaurants to build outdoor dining areas in the roadway. The council later extended the closure through a series of ordinances. Ordinance No. 6055, an uncodified "economic recovery extension and transition" ordinance, amended and restated the earlier emergency ordinances (Nos. 5944, 5963 and 5993). It kept State Street between Victoria Street and Haley Street closed to motor vehicles while an advisory committee worked on the street's long-term future. The city has published separate rules for pedestrians and cyclists on the Promenade, which apply for as long as the street stays closed to motor vehicles.

In 2023 the council voted 5–2 to extend the closure through December 31, 2026, or until a master plan was adopted. Mayor Randy Rowse and Councilmember Eric Friedman voted against the extension. The council also tightened its rules for outdoor dining structures and agreed to reopen one block near the Granada Theatre to cars. In July 2026 the council voted to keep the street closed to regular vehicle traffic while long-term planning continued.

On September 1, 2026, the council introduced an ordinance adopting the State Street Master Plan. The ordinance also amends Title 31 of the Santa Barbara Municipal Code to incorporate the plan. Later that month the city announced that the plan had been officially adopted. The plan calls for six years of implementation, with construction to begin within 18 months of adoption.

== Landmarks ==
The following is a partial list of notable places located on State Street, from the waterfront inland.

- † – listed on the National Register of Historic Places (NRHP)
- ‡ - designated a City of Santa Barbara Historic Landmark

Name	Address	Built	Status
Stearns Wharf	Foot of State St.	1872	Oldest working wooden wharf in California
Santa Barbara station † ‡	209 State St.	1905	Amtrak station
Andalucia Building †	316–324 State St.	1911–1926	Front by Lionel Pries
Faith Mission / Hotel Savoy † ‡	409 State St.	1889	Designed by Peter J. Barber; stamped-metal façade
Paseo Nuevo	600–700 blocks	1990	Open-air shopping center
El Paseo and Casa de la Guerra † ‡	808–818 State St.	1911–1929 (adobe c. 1819–1827)	Shopping arcade built around the Casa de la Guerra adobe
Janssens–Orella–Birk Building † ‡	1029–1031 State St.	1927	
Santa Barbara Museum of Art	1130 State St.	1914	Former U.S. Post Office (1914–1932); museum opened June 5, 1941
Granada Theatre ‡	1214 State St.	1924	Opened April 9, 1924. Eight stories tall and the tallest building in Santa Barbara. Reopened as a performing arts center in March 2008.
Arlington Theatre ‡	1317 State St.	1930–1931	Spanish-style movie palace; venue of the Santa Barbara International Film Festival
Trinity Episcopal Church ‡	1500 State St.	1912–1919	Gothic Revival; designated a City Landmark in 2019
La Cumbre Plaza	Upper State St.	1967	Regional shopping center in the Upper State district
MOXI, The Wolf Museum of Exploration + Innovation	125 State St.	2016	Non-profit science and children's museum.

Several other landmarks stand within a block of State Street, including the Santa Barbara County Courthouse (1100 Anacapa St.), and the Lobero Theatre (33 E. Cañon Perdido St.).

== See also ==
- City of Santa Barbara Historic Landmarks
- National Register of Historic Places listings in Santa Barbara County, California
- Streetcars in Santa Barbara, California
- Spanish Colonial Revival architecture
