= Paseo Nuevo =

Outdoor shopping center in Santa Barbara, California

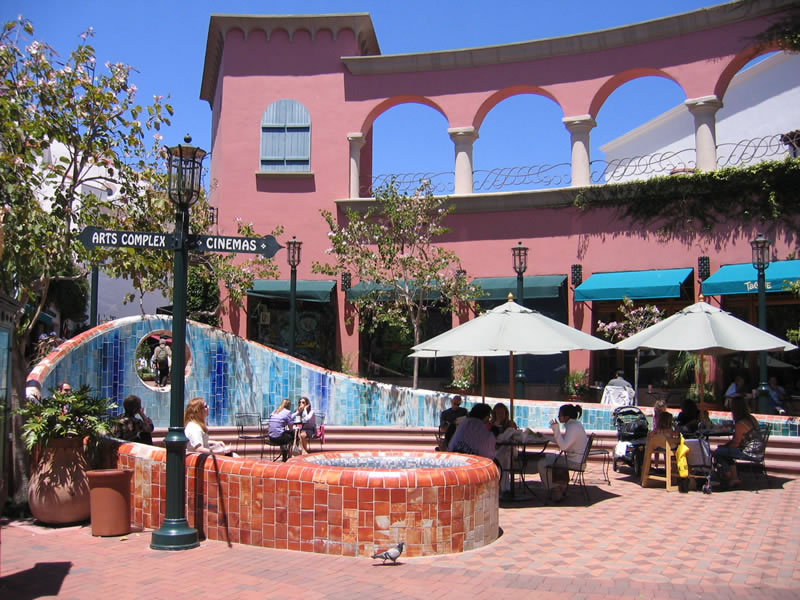
- The "North Court" plaza
- Location: State Street, Santa Barbara, California, United States
- Coordinates: 34.419°N 119.7005°W
- Opened: 1990
- Renovated: 2018–2019
- Developer: Santa Barbara Redevelopment Agency; Reininga Inc.
- Owner: City of Santa Barbara (land); see Ownership
- Architect: John Field
- Num. of anchor tenants: None (formerly 2)
- Floor area: 458,000 square feet (42,500 m^{2})
- Website: paseonuevoshopping.com

Paseo Nuevo is an open-air shopping center covering two city blocks of downtown Santa Barbara, California, beside the 600 and 700 blocks of State Street. It was built by the city's Redevelopment Agency and opened in 1990, anchored by Nordstrom and The Broadway department stores. The center is built in the Spanish Colonial Revival style and is laid out around mid-block pedestrian passages that follow the pattern of the paseos and alleys of downtown Santa Barbara. Its arts spaces, Center Stage Theater and the former Museum of Contemporary Art Santa Barbara, were included at the city's insistence. After losing both anchors, Macy's in 2017 and Nordstrom in 2020, the mall declined and its owner defaulted. In June 2026 the City Council approved an agreement under which Yardi Systems will move its headquarters into the former Macy's building, while a separate developer converts the former Nordstrom building into housing.

== History ==
=== Development and opening ===
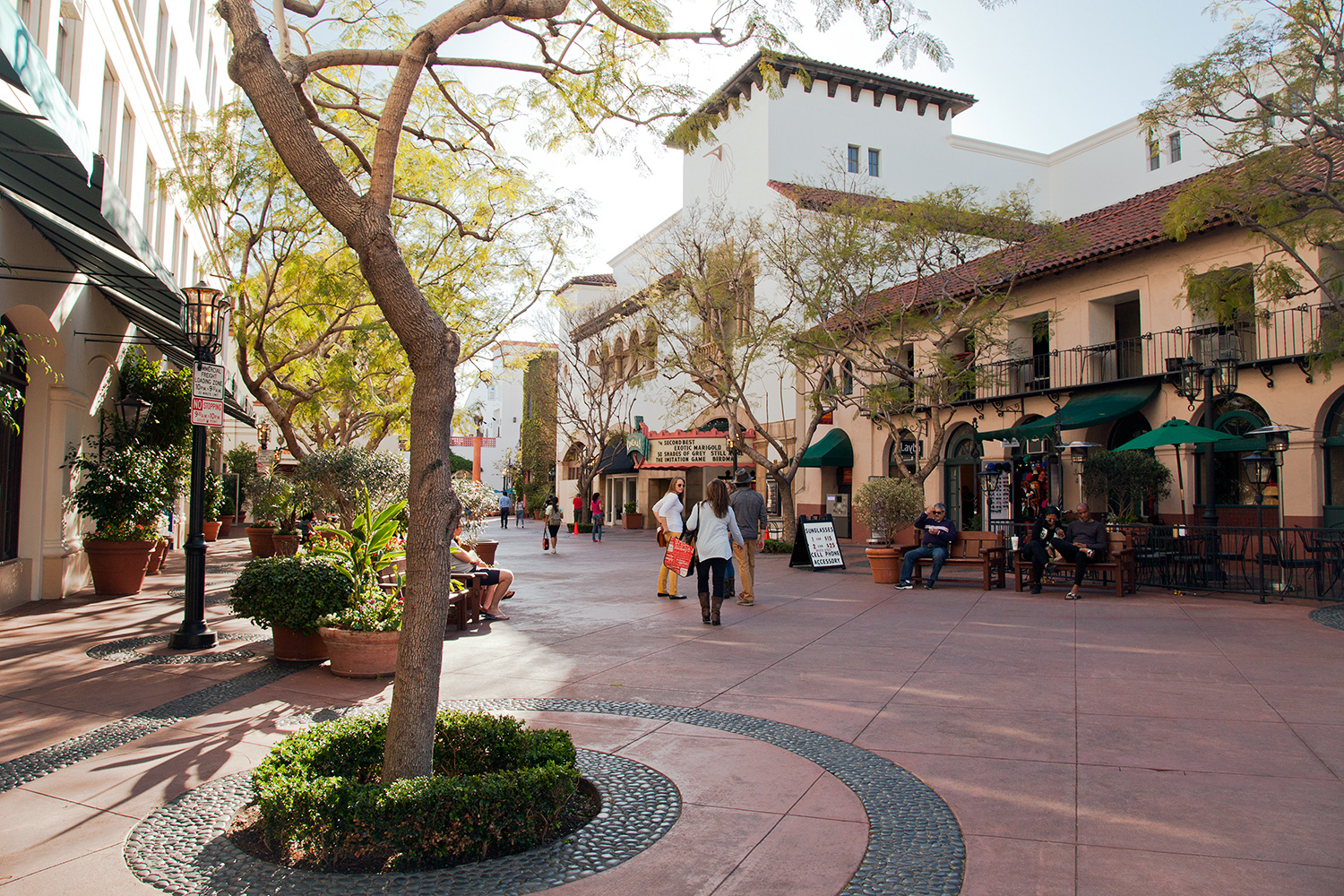
Paseo Nuevo, with its cinemas on the right

Paseo Nuevo was developed by the Santa Barbara Redevelopment Agency to bring a regional shopping center downtown, competing with La Cumbre Plaza on upper State Street. The agency acquired about seven acres of land in 1987 and 1988 for approximately $16.5 million (equivalent to $46.76 million in 2025). The city kept ownership of the land and leased it to the developer under ground leases signed in 1989 that run until 2065.

The center opened in 1990 with a Nordstrom store at its north end and a 140,000-square-foot (13,000 m^{2}) Broadway department store at its south end. As a condition of the project, the city required space for a performing arts stage and a visual arts gallery. Center Stage Theater, a black box theater on the center's second floor, opened in 1990 and is run by the a local nonprofit formed in 1989 by local performing arts groups. The Santa Barbara Contemporary Arts Forum moved into the center the same year. It was renamed the Museum of Contemporary Art Santa Barbara in 2013 and closed in August 2022 after mounting financial losses.

=== Anchor closures ===
The Broadway store became a Macy's in 1996. In 2015 the center was bought by Pacific Retail Capital Partners. Macy's closed its 135,000-square-foot (12,500 m^{2}) store in March 2017. In February 2018 Pacific Retail Capital Partners and investors advised by J.P. Morgan Asset Management bought the building, which they renamed the Ortega Building, and announced a $20 million renovation of the center.

Nordstrom, which had closed in March 2020 at the start of the COVID-19 pandemic, announced in May 2020 that it would not reopen. It had anchored the center for nearly 30 years and was its last department store. With both anchors gone and many smaller shops empty, the center's owners defaulted on their loan. In 2022 the property was returned to the lender, AllianceBernstein, in what was described as a "friendly foreclosure".

=== Redevelopment plans ===
On September 19, 2023, the City Council voted unanimously to begin negotiations on demolishing much of the center and replacing it with about 500 rental housing units. Negotiations with AllianceBernstein dragged on and by June 2025 fewer housing units were being proposed. Meanwhile, Irvine-based Shopoff Realty Investments applied under the city's new adaptive reuse ordinance to convert the three-story former Nordstrom into 112 apartments.

In 2026 the city turned from demolition to reusing the existing buildings. In May 2026 it announced talks with Yardi Systems, a Santa Barbara–based property management software company, over the vacant Macy's building. On June 2, 2026, the council unanimously backed a joint proposal from Yardi and DSP, a joint venture of Dune, Shopoff Realty Investments and Praelium. Under the agreement the city transfers its ownership of the land under the center to the two companies. They are responsible for an estimated $100 million in construction and tenant improvements. Yardi plans to convert the former Macy's building into a corporate office for about 600 employees. DSP took over the former Nordstrom building, where the environmental review describes 80 to 112 homes. In August 2026 the city's Historic Landmarks Commission gave the Nordstrom conversion its general support, with minor design suggestions. Construction on both buildings is set to begin in 2027.

== Ownership ==
The City of Santa Barbara has owned the land under Paseo Nuevo since the 1980s, while the buildings have belonged to private owners holding long-term ground leases. The center's private owners have been:

- Reininga Inc., the original developer (1990)
- Pacific Retail Capital Partners (from 2015), joined by investors advised by J.P. Morgan Asset Management in buying the former Macy's building in 2018
- AllianceBernstein, the lender, after the 2022 foreclosure
- Yardi Systems (former Macy's building) and DSP (former Nordstrom building), under the 2026 development agreement

== See also ==
- State Street
- La Cumbre Plaza
- Paseo de la Guerra
