= John Talley =

John Talley may refer to:

- John Talley (chemist), American medicinal chemist
- John Talley (American football) (born 1964), American football player
- John Talley (politician), member of the Oklahoma House of Representatives
- John Barry Talley (born 1943), musical director at the U.S. Naval Academy
