= Granada Theater (Santa Barbara, California) =

Performing arts venue in Santa Barbara, California

The Granada Theatre
- The front of the Granada as seen in August 2023.
- Interactive map of The Granada Theatre
- Location: 1214 State Street; Santa Barbara, California
- Coordinates: 34°25′26″N 119°42′17″W
- Owner: Santa Barbara Center for the Performing Arts
- Capacity: 1,550 (since 2008); 1,870 (1924)
- Type: Performing arts center

Construction
- Opened: April 9, 1924
- Renovated: 2004–2008
- Reopened: March 6, 2008
- Architects: A. B. Rosenthal (1924); 19six Architects (2008)

Tenants
- Santa Barbara Symphony; State Street Ballet, Music Academy of the West

Website
- www.granadasb.org

The Granada Theatre is a historic theatre and performing arts center located at 1214 State Street in downtown Santa Barbara, California. It opened on April 9, 1924, as a vaudeville house and movie palace. It is Santa Barbara's oldest surviving movie palace, and at eight-stories tall is the tallest building in the city. The Granada was a movie theater for most of the 20th century and was split into three screens in 1981. The nonprofit Santa Barbara Center for the Performing Arts bought it in 2003 and spent several years restoring and expanding it. The theater reopened on March 6, 2008, as a home for the city's major music, dance and opera companies. The Granada Building was designated a City of Santa Barbara Landmark in 2011.

== History ==
=== Construction and opening (1924) ===
The Granada was designed by architect A. B. Rosenthal and built in 1924. The theater auditorium sits behind an eight-story office building facing State Street, the upper six floors of which were meant to house doctors' and dentists' offices. The building went up before Santa Barbara adopted its height limits, and remains still the tallest building in the city, at about 119 feet (36 m).

The theater opened on April 9, 1924, with about 1,870 seats. Opening night featured the world premiere of the silent film Mademoiselle Midnight, starring Mae Murray. Theodore Kosloff's ballet company appeared on stage, with a 25-piece orchestra and a four-manual, 17-rank Wurlitzer theatre pipe organ. Reviewing the opening, the Santa Barbara Morning Press praised "the sumptuousness of its decorations and appointments, its comforts and conveniences, and the splendor of its great pipe organ".

=== Movie palace (1924–2003) ===
A year after it opened, the Granada survived the 1925 Santa Barbara earthquake, which destroyed most of the surrounding commercial district along State Street. In its first years the theater ran vaudeville and silent films. Fox West Coast Theatres operated it on a three-shows-a-day schedule, changing the film twice a week. In the 1930s Warner Bros. took over the Granada and made it a full-time movie house. In 1955 the theater was sold to Metropolitan Theatres.

In 1981 Metropolitan split the theater into three auditoriums. The main screen downstairs had 910 seats and two 225-seat auditoriums were built in the former balcony. The Santa Barbara Civic Light Opera staged musicals at the Granada as well as at the Lobero Theatre from 1984 until the company went bankrupt in 2001.

=== Restoration (2003–2008) ===
Proposals for a large performing arts center in Santa Barbara dated back to the 1950s. In 1997 the Santa Barbara Center for the Performing Arts (SBCPA) began a two-year study of possible sites. In 2001 Metropolitan owner Bruce Corwin publicly doubted that converting the Granada would be wise, arguing that a new building would be better. During a 2003 capital campaign, the SBCPA announced that it had obtained an option to buy the Granada at below market price and completed the purchase that year. Developer and philanthropist Michael Towbes was among the project's earliest and largest backers. Peter Frisch served as the project's executive director.

The restoration was designed by 19six Architects. Everything beyond the proscenium was rebuilt, and the triplex was returned to a single auditorium. The work added eight boxes, new dressing rooms and an enlarged stage, leaving 1,550 seats. A replica of the 1920s marquee was installed on State Street. Decorative arts studio EverGreene Architectural Arts also worked on the project. Estimates of the cost grew from $20.5 million in July 2003 to $40 million by August 2005. Final figures are most often reported at $52 million to $60 million. The renovation won a President's Award from Santa Barbara Beautiful in 2008 and an Honor Award from the Santa Barbara chapter of the American Institute of Architects in 2009.

The restored theater reopened with a gala on March 6, 2008. The office floors above the theater, marketed as the Granada Tower, received a full renovation and seismic retrofit completed in 2010.

=== Since 2008 ===
The reopening gala presented the theater as the new home of the Santa Barbara Symphony Orchestra, which had previously performed at the Arlington Theatre, and of State Street Ballet and other local companies. The theater celebrated its 10th anniversary as a performing arts center in 2018. The Granada Tower office building was offered for sale in 2016 and bought by a local investor in 2017.

The theater's centennial began on April 3, 2024, with a free screening of the half-hour documentary The Granada: Celebrating 100 Years of the Arts in Santa Barbara. A festival weekend followed on April 12–14, including a State Street block party.

== Architecture ==
The Granada Building is an eight-story office tower fronting State Street, with the auditorium behind it. It went up the year before the 1925 earthquake and is older than the Spanish Colonial Revival rebuilding that followed. Its height has never been matched downtown because of the city's later height limits. In the 2008 restoration the house was rebuilt behind the proscenium as a single auditorium with eight boxes.

== See also ==
- Arlington Theatre
- City of Santa Barbara Historic Landmarks
- Lobero Theatre
- Santa Barbara Symphony
- State Street (Santa Barbara)
