= Santa Barbara Symphony Orchestra =

Orchestra in Santa Barbara, California, USA

- Orchestra
- Founded: 1953 (73 years ago)
- Concert hall: Granada Theatre
- Principal conductor: Nir Kabaretti
- Website: thesymphony.org

The Santa Barbara Symphony is a professional symphony orchestra and registered 501(c)3 nonprofit organization, based in Santa Barbara, California, United States.

== History and operations ==
The orchestra was founded in 1953. Music directors have included Erno Daniel (1960–1967), who also taught piano at the University of California, Santa Barbara, Ronald Ondrejka (1967–1979), who taught conducting at UCSB, Frank Collura (1979–1984), Varujan Kojian (1985–93), Gisele Ben-Dor (1994–2005), and Nir Kabaretti (since 2006).

In the 1990s, the orchestra began releasing recordings, including CDs, of works by Silvestre Revueltas, Astor Piazzolla, Luis Bacalov and Heitor Villa-Lobos.

Typically, the orchestra performs a series of about seven concerts during a season, plus additional concerts, for example, a pops music and stage performance on New Year's Eve.

In 2008, the Santa Barbara Symphony moved from its long-time venue at the Arlington Theatre to the newly renovated Granada Theatre.

== See also ==
- List of symphony orchestras in the United States
- Performinng arts in Santa Barbara, California
