= Norwalk Youth Symphony =

Youth symphony orchestra in Connecticut, U.S.

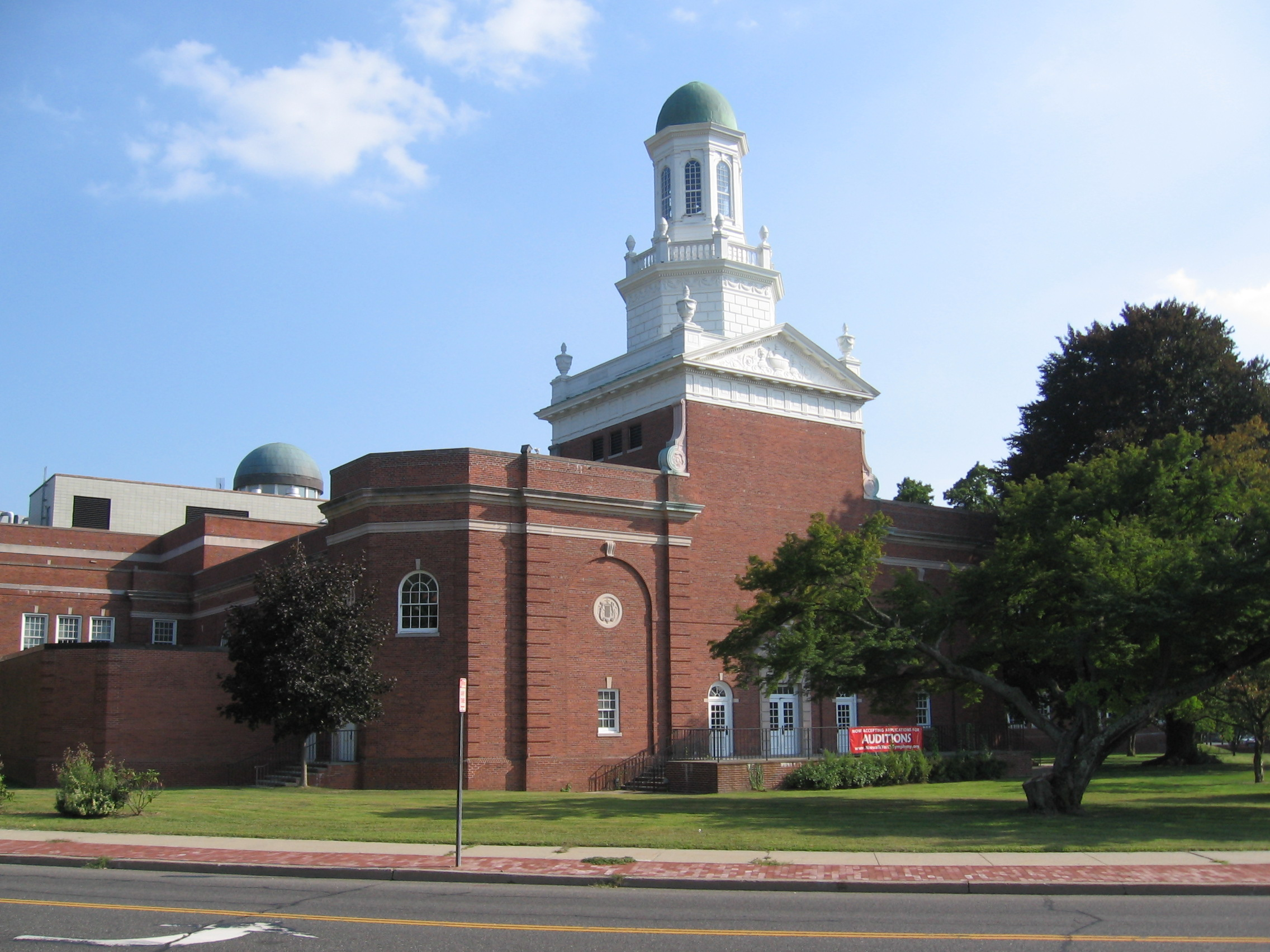
The Norwalk Concert Hall in the City Hall building (a former high school) is home to the Symphony

The Norwalk Youth Symphony (NYS) is an American symphony orchestra for high school aged and younger students. The symphony is based in Norwalk, Connecticut. Established in 1956, the symphony includes students from Connecticut and some parts of New York. The NYS has been regarded as one of the best youth orchestras in the region. In Norwalk, the NYS performs at Norwalk City Hall at least 3 times per year. The NYS has performed at the Stamford Town Center, Carnegie Hall, Tanglewood, and the United Nations. The NYS has also performed outside of the United States in such countries as the Czech Republic, Austria, Hungary, Spain, Italy, and Germany.

The NYS consists of five orchestras and the Junior Strings program, with current conductors as follows:

- Principal Orchestra: Conductor, Jonathan Yates. This is the most advanced group, performing advanced and demanding music that is not usually performed by students. They have performed works by composers such as Mahler, Berlioz, Wagner, Stravinsky, and Rimsky-Korsakov.
- Concert Orchestra: Conductor, Russel Ger. This orchestra is made up of advanced students that still need time to develop their skills prior to moving into the Principal orchestra. Their repertoire has included works by composers such as Tchaikovsky, Saint-Saëns, Borodin, Berlioz, and Beethoven.
- Philharmonia Orchestral Winds: Conductor, Barry Zhou. This is a woodwind/brass orchestra that is often the beginning level for most wind/ brass players.
- Philharmonia Orchestral Strings: Conductor, Jessica McNamara. This is a string orchestra that offers harder and more challenging music and prepares players for concert orchestra.
- Prelude Orchestra: Conductor, Rafael Videira. This is a string orchestra that is often the first branch of the Norwalk Youth Symphony for string players.
- Junior Strings: Conductor, Rafael Videira. This is a string orchestra that is the beginning level for elementary string students to continue their playing outside of school.

NYS also includes a Junior Strings ensemble, percussion ensemble, chamber music program, and chamber orchestra.

NYS alumni have gone on to attend some of the greatest music conservatories in the country, including the Juilliard School and the Manhattan School of Music. Past conductors/music directors have included Miguel Harth-Bedoya, Tara Simoncic, Gisele Ben-Dor, and John Huwiler.
