= MOXI, The Wolf Museum of Exploration + Innovation =

Museum in Santa Barbara, California

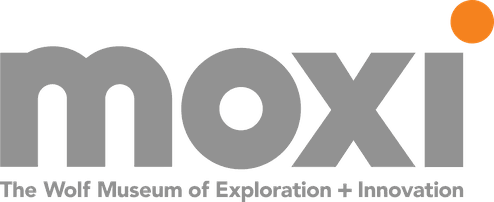

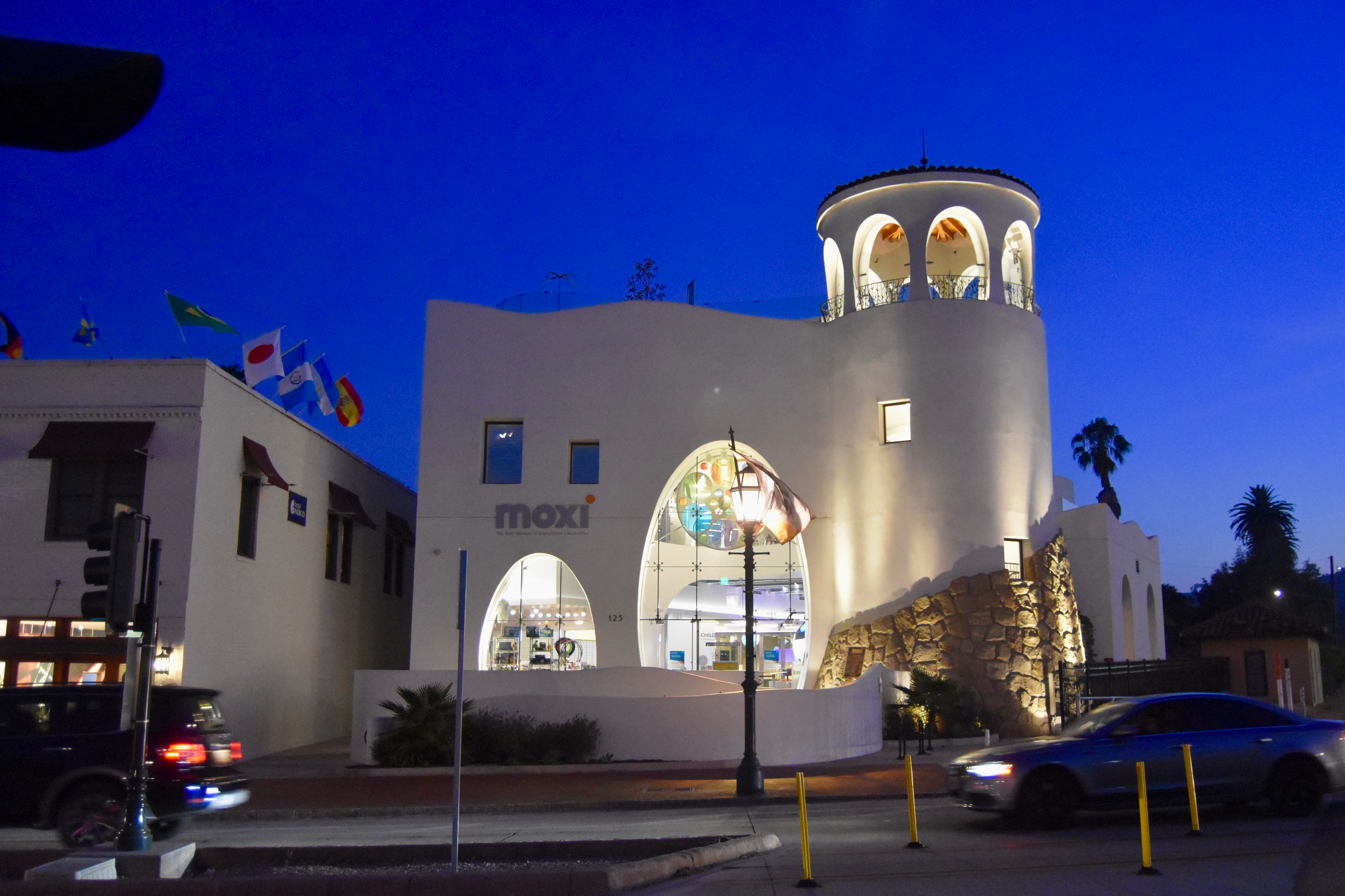
- MOXI's entrance as seen from State Street.
- Established: February 25, 2017
- Location: 125 State Street, Santa Barbara, California
- Coordinates: 34°24′48″N 119°41′30″W
- Type: Science; Children's
- Visitors: 167,361 (2024)
- President & CEO: Robin Gose Ed.D
- Architect: Barry Berkus
- Website: moxi.org

MOXI, The Wolf Museum of Exploration + Innovation is a non-profit science and children's museum in Santa Barbara, California. A 501(c)(3) non-profit, the museum opened on February 25, 2017.

The 17,000 square feet (1,600 m^{2}) of exhibits are primarily geared towards children with a particular emphasis placed on STEAM education. As of 2024 MOXI saw just over 167,000 visitors annually and in June 2024 celebrated its 1-millionth visitor.

The Wolf in the museum's name comes from Dick Wolf who donated multiple millions of dollars to the museum and whose ex-wife Noelle sat on the board for over a decade.

The museum is located between the historic Santa Barbara Train Station and Santa Barbara's Hotel Indigo.

== History ==
The 25,000-square-foot (2,300 m^{2}) building sits on land which was leased from the city at $1 a year. The exterior of the museum was designed by the late Santa Barbara architect Barry Berkus.

The museum broke ground in October 2014 at a ceremony attended by then Santa Barbara mayor Helene Schneider and emceed by Andrew Firestone.

As part of their $1 a year lease with the city, MOXI was tasked with removing all possible barriers to exploring the sciences. One such example is that graphics are bilingual, written in both Spanish and English.

== Exhibits ==
The diverse exhibits at MOXI are focused on all aspects of STEAM education. The museum features a theater which was built by researchers at UC Santa Barbara's AlloSphere.

One exhibits features a foley sound design studio where visitors are able to record their own sound effects to different Hollywood films including the 1990 film Edward Scissorhands. In another exhibit, participants can build their own model racecar before sending it down a test track.

In October 2025, MOXI unveiled two new exhibits geared particularly towards their younger visitors. Crawlers' Corner and Quiet Cave are a space designed for the youngest learners as well as a safe space for "those who need a reset."

== Associations ==
MOXI is a member of the Association of Science and Technology Centers.
