= David Ott (composer) =

American composer of classical music (born 1947)

- Born: July 5, 1947; Crystal Falls, Michigan, U.S.
- Occupations: Composer, Conductor, Pianist, and Educator
- Website: davidottcomposer.com

David Ott (born July 5, 1947) is an American composer of classical music.

Born in Crystal Falls, Michigan, Ott's works include four symphonies, an opera (The Widows Lantern), the Annapolis Overture, written for the Annapolis Symphony Orchestra, and various pieces of children's music He has been nominated for the Pulitzer Prize in Music (four times) and the Grammys (twice). The premiere of his Concerto for Two Cellos and Orchestra, performed by the National Symphony Orchestra under the baton of Mstislav Rostropovich, gained Ott the 1988 nomination. He graduated from the University of Wisconsin–Platteville in 1969. He received his master's degree at Indiana University School of Music in 1971, and his PhD in music at the University of Kentucky in 1982.

Ott has served on the faculties of Houghton College in New York, Pfeiffer College in North Carolina, and DePauw University in Indiana, being honored as Outstanding Professor at two of these institutions. He also held the appointment of Pace Eminent Scholar and Composer in Residence at the University of West Florida.

David Ott was the founder (2001) and director of the Philharmonic Orchestra of Northwest Florida, until it disbanded in 2008.

Ott's opera, The Widow's Lantern, premiered September 26, 2009, and was performed by the Pensacola Opera. After the premiere, Dr. Ott was seriously injured when he fell 14 feet into the basement below the orchestra pit. His newest work, Symphony No. 5, was premiered with the Reston Community Orchestra (Reston, Virginia) on November 22, 2009.

On January 10, 2013, the Northwest Florida Daily News reported that Ott had recently started a foundation, Music for Healing, to bring music to the sick and elderly in Okaloosa and Walton counties.

== Discography ==
- David Ott: Symphony No. 2, Symphony No. 3, Koss Classics KC-3301, 1993. Grand Rapids Symphony, Catherine Comet, cond.
- David Ott: The Water Garden, Koss Classics KC-1023, 1995. Includes The Water Garden (symphonic poem, 9'33"), Concerto for Two Cellos and Orchestra (3 mvt., 23'57"), and Music of the Canvas (Three symphonic sketches representing paintings by Richard Pousette-Dart, commissioned by the Indianapolis Museum of Art, 26'15"). Performed by the Milwaukee Symphony Orchestra, Zdeněk Mácal, Cond., Solo cellists in the concerto are Daniel Laufer and Wolfgang Laufer.
- American Journeys David Ott: Concerto for alto flute and strings; Piano concerto No. 2. Franz Liszt/John Adams: The Black Gondola. Ferruccio Busoni/John Adams: Berceuse élégiaque. Gisele Ben-Dor, conductor. Christine Michelle Smith, flutist. Frederick Moyer, piano. London Symphony Orchestra. JRI Recordings, 1998.
