= Leslie Dunner =

American conductor and composer

Leslie Byron Dunner (born January 5, 1956) is an American composer, conductor, clarinetist, and college professor. He was born in New York City and attended the University of Rochester Eastman School of Music, graduating in 1978 with a B.A. degree. He received an M.A. degree in music theory and musicology from Queens College in 1979, and a D.M.A. in orchestral conducting from the University of Cincinnati in 1982. From 1982-1986 he served as Assistant Professor and Director of Instrumental Music at Carleton College in Northfield, Minnesota.

Dunner's first appointment as music director was with the Symphony Nova Scotia in 1996. He remained with that orchestra for three seasons.

In 1998, while still in his second year as music director of Symphony Nova Scotia, Dunner took up the post of music director of the Annapolis Symphony Orchestra. In 2018, he became Orchestra Director at Interlochen Center for the Arts.
