= PropertyShark =

U.S. technology and real estate company

- Website type: Subsidiary of Yardi Systems
- Founded: 2003; 23 years ago
- Headquarters: New York City
- Key people: Matthew Haines, Founder
- Industry: Technology, Real Estate
- Website: www.propertyshark.com

PropertyShark is an online real estate database and property research tool that provides building details, ownership information, comparable sales, and foreclosure data to real estate professionals in New York and other major U.S. markets. Launched in January 2003 by Matthew Haines, the real estate database and research website was acquired by Yardi Systems and integrated into its suite of software in 2010.

== History ==
PropertyShark was founded by real estate investor and software developer Matthew Haines following his work on renovating a five-family brownstone in Harlem. The initial website launched on New Year's Day in 2003 and was first named MatthewHaines.com and later changed to NYCpropertyresearch.com. Haines reportedly created PropertyShark to make real estate data more accessible and help potential homeowners become more comfortable in investing in the neighborhood.

In 2004, Haines was joined by his college friend, Ryan Slack, who became co-owner and CEO of PropertyShark. Under Ryan Slack, the real estate site reportedly explored more creative content, such as listing air rights available above buildings, photographs of every property in Manhattan, phone numbers of property owners, or thematic real estate maps.

By 2006, PropertyShark evolved to include 20 million properties in 16 markets across the U.S., including New York City.

In 2006, Bill Stanford joined as vice president of sales and became the CEO two years later. Stanford exited PropertyShark in 2010 when the firm was sold to Yardi Systems, a company specializing in real estate investment and property management software. Matthew Haines continued as vice president of the company.

The acquisition by Yardi Systems aimed to expand PropertyShark's database nationally. Since the acquisition, PropertyShark has developed several additional services for real estate professionals, gathering data from various public and proprietary sources to provide property information. For example, in 2019, the company launched Platinum Real Owners Behind LLC Owned Properties, which helps users identify the true owners behind LLCs.

== Business ==
PropertyShark focuses on providing residential and commercial real estate data, including property classifications, lot sizes, ownership information, contact details, maps, recent sales prices, comparables, for-sale and for-lease listings, foreclosures and pre-foreclosures, taxes and information on zoning regulations. PropertyShark allows users to research residential or commercial properties with a free account, but most features require a paid subscription.
