= Varujan Kojian =

Armenian-American violinist and conductor

Varujan Kojian (March 12, 1935; Beirut, Lebanon – March 4, 1993; Carpinteria, California) was an Armenian-American violinist and conductor from Beirut, Lebanon. He studied violin at the Conservatoire de Paris awarded the Premier Prix in 1956, and subsequently with Ivan Galamian and Jascha Heifetz. Kojian joined the Los Angeles Philharmonic where he became an assistant concertmaster in 1965. Naturalising as an American citizen in 1967, Kojian began conducting studies with Sasha Popov, and was appointed assistant conductor to Zubin Mehta in 1970. Kojian continued his studies with Hans Swarowsky in Vienna in 1971. From 1973 to 1980 he was the guest conductor at the Royal Opera in Stockholm and during the same years was also working as an associate conductor for the Seattle Symphony. From 1980 to 1983 he was director of the Utah Symphony and a year later became a member of the Santa Barbara Symphony Orchestra of which he became director from 1985 to 1993 before he died at the age of 57.
