= Alexander Hamilton (Maryland doctor) =

American physician

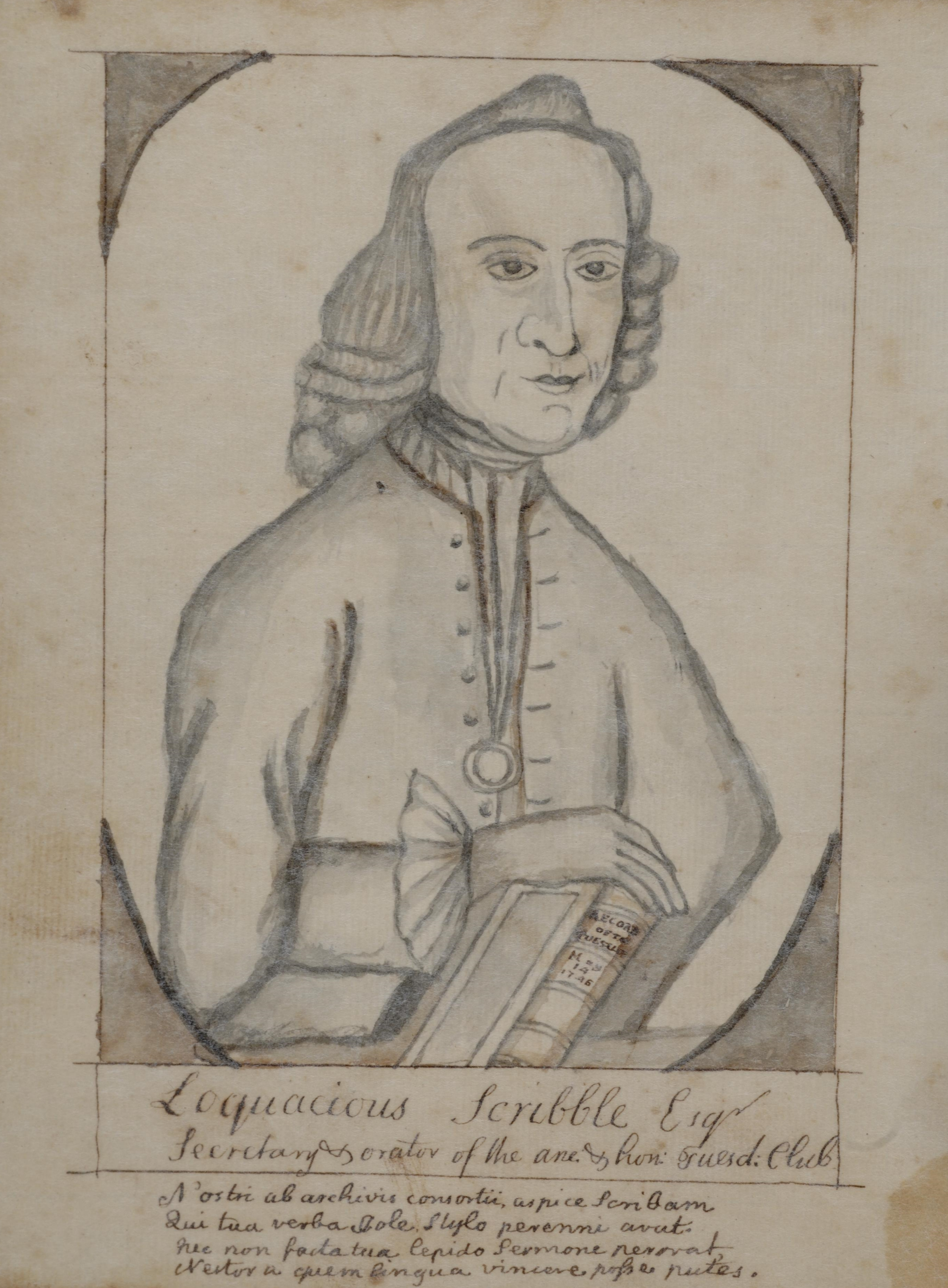
Alexander Hamilton's self-portrait from The History of the Ancient and Honorable Tuesday Club, held at The John Work Garrett Library

Dr. Alexander Hamilton (September 26, 1712 – May 11, 1756) was a Scottish-born doctor and writer who lived and worked in Annapolis in 18th-century colonial Maryland. Historian Leo Lemay says his 1744 travel diary Gentleman's Progress: The Itinerarium of Dr. Alexander Hamilton is "the best single portrait of men and manners, of rural and urban life, of the wide range of society and scenery in colonial America." His diary covered Maryland to Maine; and biographer Elaine Breslaw says he encountered: "the relatively primitive social milieu of the New World. He faced unfamiliar and challenging social institutions: the labor system that relied on black slaves, extraordinarily fluid social statuses, distasteful business methods, unpleasant conversational quirks, as well as variant habits of dress, food, and drink."

== Early life ==
Hamilton was born in or near Edinburgh. His father was Dr. William Hamilton, Professor of Divinity and Principal of the University of Edinburgh. He was raised and educated as a member of the Scottish gentry. He emigrated to Maryland in 1738 and quickly set up his medical practice in Annapolis.

== Career ==
Hamilton is known for his travel journal, Itinerareum, recording his journey in 1744 from Maryland, to York, Maine. The work has been widely cited by scholars of colonial America. Richard Bushman, for example, uses an incident of Hamilton observing and critiquing a fellow traveller's behavior in an inn in order to demonstrate ideas surrounding gentility in colonial America.

In the Itinerarium, as described by Michel Foucault, Hamilton exhibits both the use of a “horizontal gaze” (which was utilized by natural historians at the time) and a “vertical/clinical gaze” (popular with those in medical fields) when perceiving the world and subjects, his fusion of the two allows him to provide an in-depth world view that many similar writings from the time did not share. Using this fusions of the gazes described by Foucault, Hamilton provides highly detailed accounts of cities, structures, and natural objects such as his description of a stone on Staten Island: “I took notice of one intire stone there about 10 foot high, 12 foot long, and 6 or 7 foot thick. At one end of it grew an oak tree, the trunk of which seemed to adhere or grow to the stone" (p. 39).

Hamilton also founded The Tuesday Club in 1745. This Annapolis-based social club included prominent men of the colonial Maryland community as both members and guests. Hamilton wrote a humorous account of the club's history in 1755, in which he gave its members comical pseudonyms and included caricatures and illustrations of memorable events; Hamilton even christened himself as Loquacious Scribble. Entitled The History of the Ancient and Honorable Tuesday Club: From the Earliest Ages Down to This Present Year, it was not published during Hamilton's lifetime. The original manuscript is housed at the John Work Garrett Library of the Johns Hopkins University.

Hamilton is known for his engaging and humorous writing style, regularly describing candidly his encounters with those he believed to be his social inferiors. His use of humor in these situations was a device common among the gentry of the time for describing impertinent, ill-judged manners.

== Later life ==
In later life, Hamilton continued to build up his medical practice in Annapolis, Maryland while broadening the scope of his writing to include articles for the Maryland Gazette and the satirical History of the Ancient and Noble Tuesday Club, the finest humorous work of colonial America.

He married Miss Margaret Dulany (daughter of Daniel Dulany the Elder) in May 1747, thereby joining one of Maryland's most powerful families. As a result of this new found social influence Hamilton successfully ran for a seat on the Annapolis Convention, occupying it from 1753 to 1754.

Hamilton died on May 11, 1756, childless, at the age of 43, leaving all his possessions to his widow, Margaret Dulany Hamilton. Upon his death, a friend wrote in the Maryland Gazette "The death of this valuable and worthy gentleman is justly lamented...No man in his sphere, has left fewer enemies or more friends".

== Influence ==
Hamilton represents a typical member of the pre-revolution, colonial American gentry, "a paradigm of eighteenth century urbanity, sophistication and wit", and as such his Itinerareum is now seen as a very valuable tool for the study of Eighteenth century colonial history.

== See also ==
- List of people from Maryland
- List of physicians
- List of American writers
- List of non-fiction writers
- List of Scottish writers

== Bibliography ==
- Breslaw, Elaine G. Dr. Alexander Hamilton and Provincial America: Expanding the Orbit of Scottish Culture (2008), a standard scholarly biography excerpt
- Breslaw, Elaine G. "'Scotch drollery' in the marketplace: Dr. Alexander Hamilton's amusing instruction in the Maryland Gazette." Early American Literature 42.2 (2007): 217-233. online
- Breslaw, Elaine G. "Marriage, money, and sex: Dr. Hamilton finds a wife." Journal of Social History 36.3 (2003): 657-673. online
- Bushman, Richard. "Bodies and Minds" in Bushman, The Refinement of America: persons, houses, cities (New York, 1993).
- Micklus, Robert. "The Delightful Instruction of Dr. Alexander Hamilton's Itinerarium." American literature 60#3 (1988): 359-384. in JSTOR
- Micklus, Robert. The Comic Genius of Dr. Alexander Hamilton (Univ. of Tennessee Press, 1990).
- Needler, Geoffrey D. "Linguistic Evidence from Alexander Hamilton's Itinerarium." American Speech 42.3 (1967): 211-218. in JSTOR

=== Primary sources ===
- Hamilton, Alexander. Gentleman's Progress: The Itinerarium of Dr. Alexander Hamilton, 1744 (University of Pittsburgh Press, 1948) edited by Carl Bridenbaugh
