= John Barry Talley =

American musical director (born 1943)

John Barry Talley (born July 22, 1943) is a musical director at the United States Naval Academy.

== Early life and education ==
Talley grew up on a farm near Princeton, Kentucky. While attending high school, he studied piano at Bethel College, a private Christian college, now defunct, in nearby Hopkinsville. Upon graduation, Talley enrolled in Ohio's Oberlin College Conservatory of Music, where he graduated in 1965 with a major in piano performance. He stayed at Oberlin for another year to complete a second major in choral conducting.

Talley later attended the Peabody Institute of the Johns Hopkins University in Baltimore, holding successive fellowships in music theory, piano, and choral conducting. After earning his Master of Music degree in 1967 from the institute – the oldest conservatory in the United States and one of the world's most highly regarded performing arts schools – he began a doctoral program.

By 1971, Talley completed the program's course and residency requirements. His Baltimore teachers included Leo Mueller (orchestral conducting), Theodore Morrison (choral conducting), Norman Johnson, Gregg Smith and Ray Robinson.

While in Baltimore, Talley also held several professional positions, including as the organist and choirmaster of various churches and as the conductor of an oratorio society, a German singing society, two music theatre troupes plus choral programs at three private schools—Bryn Mawr, Boy's Latin and Garrison Forest.

== Career ==
In 1971, Talley accepted a staff position as the assistant director of musical activities at the U.S. Naval Academy. His roles included organist and choirmaster plus director of the academy's music theatre program and Glee Club. The following year, Talley earned a promotion to become the director of musical activities, a position he held for 36 years until his 2006 retirement.

With a demanding schedule, Talley paused his work on a doctoral degree for a few years; however, in 1983, he received the Doctor of Musical Arts Degree from the Peabody Institute. His dissertation, "Secular Music in Colonial Annapolis, 1745-56," received a positive response from the scholarly community and was later published as part of the acclaimed "Music in American Life" book series by the University of Illinois Press.

While the musical ensembles of the Naval Academy consumed most of his time, Talley continued his involvement with colonial American music through lectures, performances and the restaging of historic musical events, from balls at the Maryland State House to ballad operas at St. John's College, presentations for the Supreme Court Historical Society and the Library of Congress, Maryland 350 celebrations, U.S. Constitution bicentennial events and various symposiums on 18th-century American culture.

Under Talley's direction, the Naval Academy Glee Club rose to a position of national prominence, appearing in many of America's concert halls including New York's Town Hall and Lincoln Center, Washington's Kennedy Center, and Dallas's Meyerson Hall; cathedrals, churches, schools, and colleges throughout the US, and European tours that included England, Belgium, Sicily, and Italy. Under his direction, the Glee Club appeared in more than one hundred nationally televised programs and were featured on NBC's Today Show, ABC's Good Morning America, the CBS Morning Show, numerous appearances on the Kennedy Center Honors, several U.S. Presidential Inaugural Galas, and a twenty-year run on NBC/TNT's annual Christmas in Washington. In the course of these performances, Talley and the Glee Club performed with many of America's leading performers from stage and screen, representing the full range of music in America, from Broadway to the Metropolitan Opera to legends of pop, rock, and country music. Many of these events included the President of the United States in the audience, and in the course of his career, Talley and his singers performed for virtually every president from Richard Nixon to George W. Bush. A favorite at the academy is the annual Christmas performance of Handel's Messiah, featuring the men and women of the Naval Academy, the Annapolis Symphony Orchestra and professional soloists, often drawn from the ranks of the Metropolitan Opera Company. Several of these performances have been televised throughout the country on PBS stations, and abroad on the US Armed Forces Network.

The Naval Academy music program grew substantially under Talley's guidance. New ensembles were created that reflected an expanding interest in music and the changing demographics of the school. These included a symphony orchestra, a pipe and drum corps, a gospel choir and a women's glee club. Additions to the program included an annual spring oratorio, expanding the choral repertoire to include major works for chorus and orchestra such as Requiems by Verdi, Mozart, and Brahms, symphonies with chorus by Beethoven, Mahler, and Vaughan Williams and other major works such as Mendelssohn's Elijah and Haydn's Creation. In 1992 he established and acquired funding for The Distinguished Artists Series which brings performers of international stature to the academy's Alumni Hall, performing for the Brigade of Midshipmen and the Annapolis community. During the final third of Dr. Talley's tenure, the Glee Club began to appear with major Symphony Orchestras as featured guest artists; these included the Phoenix Symphony Orchestra, and Columbus Symphony, and the Charlotte Symphony Orchestra.

Talley advocated for professional leadership within the academy's music program, expanding its staff of two in 1971 to its present size of 19, with highly trained leadership for the Drum & Bugle Corps, the Orchestra, Women's Glee Club and Gospel Choir, music theatre, full-time office staff, professional singers for its chapel program and a dedicated ticketing operation.

Although primarily a conductor, Talley maintained a high level of keyboard skill, and was often heard playing the organ for Naval Academy chapel services and occasionally appearing as a concerto soloist with the Naval Academy Band.

Among his greatest contributions were the many musical arrangements he created for the choral groups at the academy; music for the chapel choirs, special arrangements for specific programs such as a program of Depression-era music for a FDR commemoration, televised from the US House of Representatives before a joint session of congress and carried by all the major networks. The scope and range of these arrangements can be heard on the many recordings available of Naval Academy choruses, primarily produced by Richardson Recordings.

He retired in December 2006.

Talley continues to work actively as a musician, directing Annapolis Music Festivals, working as an associate conductor with Encore Creativity's Chautauqua program in western New York, serving as a choral clinician, and filling in from time to time as guest organist at local churches, including the Naval Academy Chapel.

== Discography ==
- Set Sail, 1991, Richardson Records, #70007.
- Musical Traditions in Navy Blue and Gold, 1991, Richardson Recording #70017.
- Eternal Father I, Richardson Records, 1991, #70001
- Eternal Father II, Richardson Records, 1995, #70006
- Eternal Father III, Richardson Records, 1996, #70021
- A Capella, Richardson Records, 1995, #70020.
- On Tour, Richardson Records, 2001, #70015.
- On Tour II: San Francisco, U.S. Naval Academy, 2010, #606259.
- Christmas Spirit, Richardson Records, 1992, #70002.
- Annapolis Sounds, Vol. 1, Richardson Records, 2008, #70003
- Annapolis Sounds, Vol. 2, Richardson Records, 2008, #70028.
- Over the Hills and Far Away, Being a Collection of Music from 18th Century Annapolis, Albany Records, 1990.
