= Annapolis Symphony Orchestra =

Symphony in Annapolis, Maryland, U.S.

The Annapolis Symphony Orchestra (ASO), located in Annapolis, Maryland, has been in operation since 1962. Its founders include Kenneth W. Page, a well-respected civic leader in the Annapolis area during the 1960s who was also the music director of the Annapolis High School band. The ASO has hosted guests such as Cuban violinist Guillermo Perch and Charlie Byrd. It inspired composer David Ott to create the Annapolis Overture, which premiered in 1993. José-Luis Novo has been the music director since the 2005–2006 season.

For 50 years, the Annapolis Symphony Orchestra has served as the leading performing arts organization in Maryland's capital city. Formed in 1962, the ASO now features 70 professional musicians who perform a variety of symphonic music for audiences of all ages. It is the largest performing arts organization in Anne Arundel County. The ASO currently produces and presents five Lexus Classic Series concerts, four Education Concerts, two Family concerts, one Holiday Pops Concert and one free Pops in the Park Community Concert. The Pops in the Park and two joint concerts with the United States Naval Academy bring the ASO before thousands of new audience members each year.

The ASO sponsors numerous award-winning education and outreach programs in community schools, reaching thousands of school children from diverse backgrounds. With a budget of $1 million annually, the ASO is governed by a 25-member volunteer board of trustees and operated by a professional staff of five full-time employees and led by renowned music director, José-Luis Novo. Previous music directors were Leslie Dunner (1998–2003), Gisele Ben-Dor (1991–1997), Peter Bay (1983–1990), and Leon Fleisher (1970–1982).

== See also ==
Music of Annapolis
