= Lobero Theatre =

Coordinates: 34.4216°N 119.6999°W

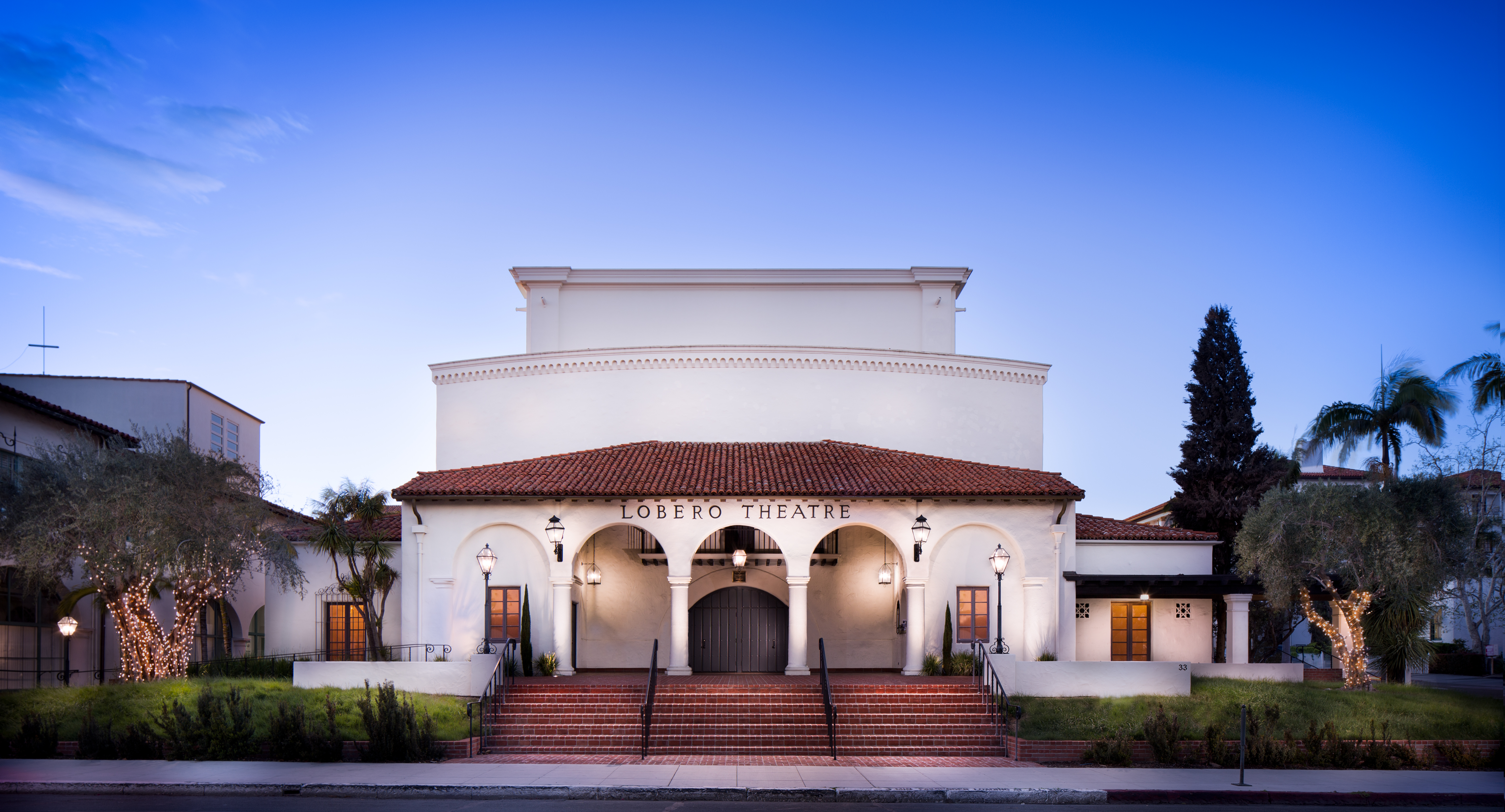
- Exterior of venue, from Canon Perdido St (c.2005)
- Interactive map of Lobero Theatre
- Address: 33 E Canon Perdido St; Santa Barbara, California; United States
- Owner: Lobero Theatre Foundation
- Capacity: 604

Construction
- Opened: February 22, 1873
- Renovated: 1922-24; 2013
- Architects: George Washington Smith, Lutah Maria Riggs

Website
- Venue website

California Historical Landmark
- Reference no.: 361

The Lobero Theatre is a historic performing arts theater in Santa Barbara, California. Founded in 1873 by José Lobero, it is California's oldest continuously operating theater.The original opera house was replaced in 1924 by the present theater, designed by George Washington Smith and Lutah Maria Riggs in the Spanish Colonial Revival style.

Throughout its history, the Lobero has served as a center for theater, music, film, and civic events in Santa Barbara. Performers appearing at the theater have included Clark Gable, Humphrey Bogart, Ingrid Bergman, Igor Stravinsky, Sergei Rachmaninoff, Paul Robeson, Marian Anderson, Dave Brubeck, and Bing Crosby. In 2023, Architectural Digest included the theater on its list of the world's eleven most beautiful theaters.

== History ==
=== Founding and José Lobero ===
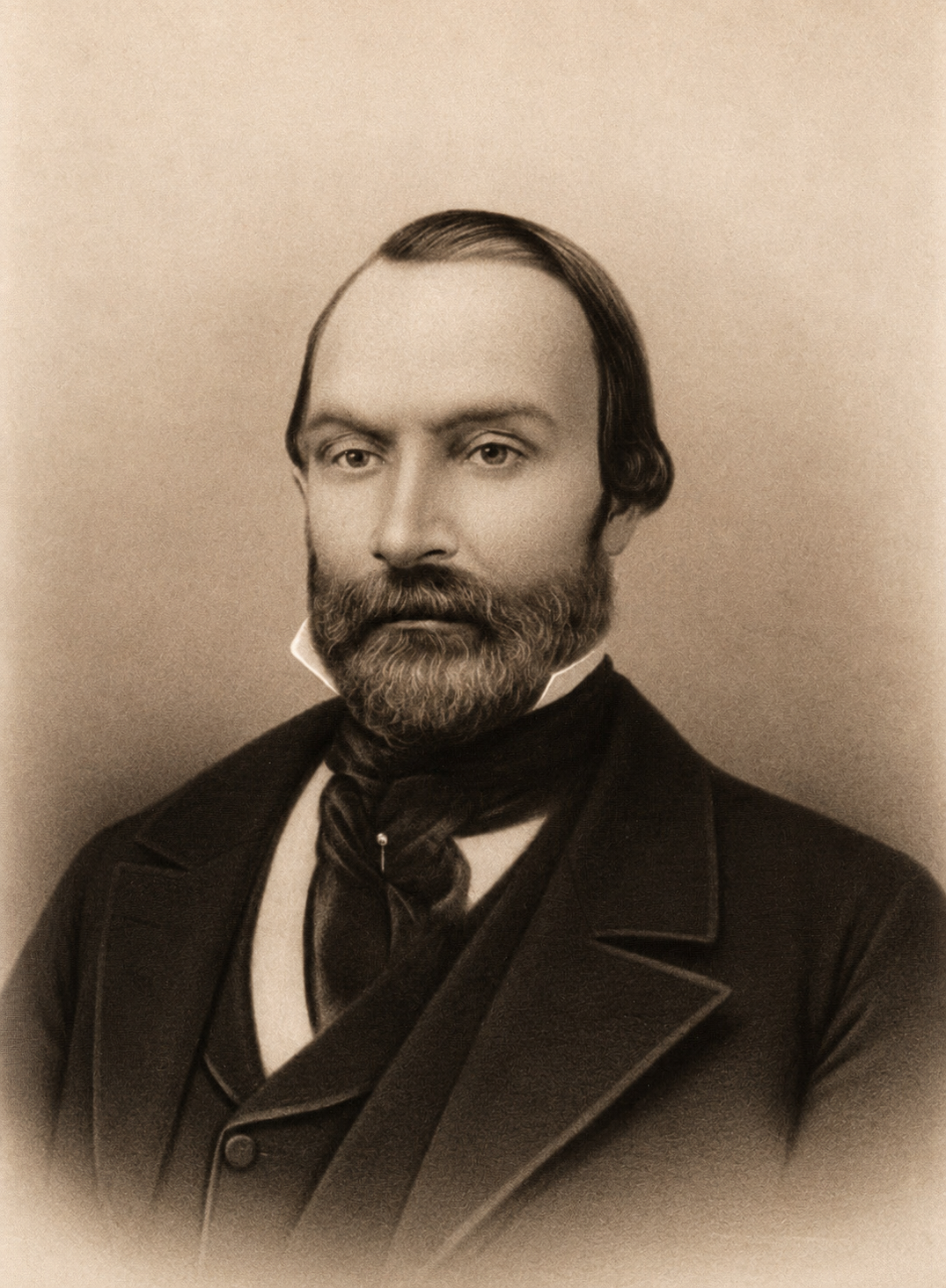
José Lobero, founder of Lobero's Theatre

Giuseppe Lobero was born in Genoa, Italy, and immigrated to San Francisco during the California Gold Rush in the early 1850s. A trombone player by trade, Lobero performed in San Francisco philharmonic orchestras before relocating to the small coastal town of Santa Barbara. After arriving in predominantly Hispanic Santa Barbara, he adopted the name "José" and became proprietor of the Brewery Saloon at the corner of State and Canon Perdido streets. Lobero also organized a brass band that performed in local parades and funeral processions.

During the mid-nineteenth century, Santa Barbara was transitioning from a small former Mexican pueblo into an increasingly Americanized commercial town. Public entertainment in the city was limited, and theatrical performances, lectures, and musical programs were often held in temporary or improvised venues.

Recognizing the community's growing desire for cultural and civic gathering spaces, José Lobero obtained financing in 1871 from civic leader Colonel William Hollister to convert an adobe schoolhouse on East Canon Perdido Street into Lobero's Theatre. Construction took nearly three years and cost approximately $60,000.

The official opening took place on February 22, 1873, with a Grand Italian Operatic Concert. In a review several days later, a local newspaper complained that "The outrageous and hideous cat-calls, shrieks and noise of the half-grown, rude boys at the concert on Saturday evening were simply intolerable."

According to later accounts, the Lobero was the only opera house south of San Francisco at the time of its opening.

Construction of the theater attracted attention elsewhere in Southern California, particularly in Los Angeles. In 1876, the Daily Evening Express observed that "Even Santa Barbara has anticipated us in this matter. The Lobero Theatre there is a creditable building and is far ahead of anything we have in Los Angeles. Santa Barbara has the building without the people, while we have the people without the building."

José Lobero's ownership of the theater lasted only twelve years. In 1885, he lost control of the property to creditors following ongoing financial difficulties. On June 28, 1892, Lobero died by suicide in Santa Barbara at the age of 69.

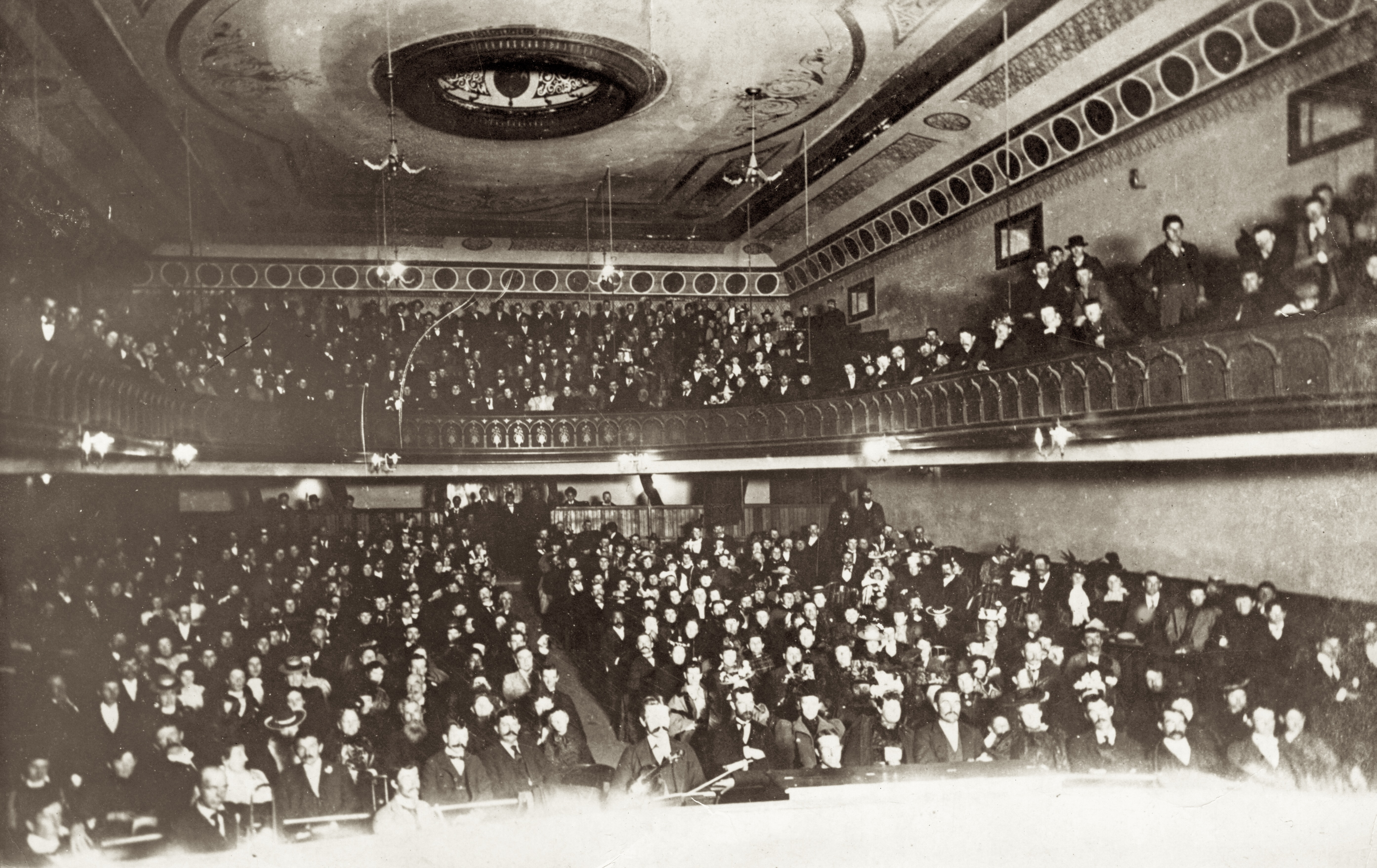
Interior of Lobero's Theatre during a performance, c. 1880

=== Entertainment and Civic Life at Lobero's Theatre (1873–1924) ===
Despite its location in the Chinese quarter and red-light district, historian Kevin Starr described the Lobero as Santa Barbara's "window on the world of entertainment" during the late nineteenth century.

Popular American melodramas such as Under the Gaslight and Uncle Tom's Cabin were frequently presented by traveling theatrical troupes. Vaudeville acts, blackface minstrel performances, classical music recitals, light opera productions, magic acts, séances, and demonstrations exposing fraudulent spiritualism also appeared regularly at the theater.

For several months in 1884, all of the seats were removed from the opera house so that it could be converted into a roller-skating rink.

By 1889, newspaper advertisements were referring to the venue simply as the "Opera House."

In addition to entertainment programming, the Lobero hosted political meetings, charitable fundraisers, public lectures, educational ceremonies, and community celebrations. Just months after opening, the theater hosted Santa Barbara's first bipartisan Citizens' Convention in July 1873.

Educational events were also regularly held at the venue. In May 1880, the theater hosted a graduation ceremony for one of the earliest graduating classes of Santa Barbara High School. The graduating class consisted of only two students.

Charitable activities likewise formed an important part of the theater's civic role. In April 1890, Lobero's Theatre hosted a five-day Grand Charity Carnival benefiting the Cottage Hospital building fund, which contributed to the establishment of Santa Barbara Cottage Hospital in 1891.

Women's suffrage gatherings frequently drew large audiences to the theater and were sometimes conducted in Spanish. On October 17, 1896, women's suffrage advocate Susan B. Anthony spoke at the Lobero Opera House in support of California Amendment 6, a proposed women's voting rights measure. Contemporary accounts reported that the theater's 1,300 seats were filled and that hundreds were turned away.

At the turn of the twentieth century, the Lobero adapted to changing forms of entertainment and technology. In July 1897, the opera house hosted a public motion picture exhibition featuring short films projected using Thomas Edison's Vitascope system.

By the 1910s, competition from motion pictures and newer theaters, including the Potter Theatre on State Street, contributed to the Lobero's decline. As attendance fell, the theater increasingly relied on temperance lectures, wrestling matches, and smaller vaudeville acts. The final event held in the original Lobero's Theatre took place on October 28, 1916, when California governor Hiram Johnson, then a candidate for the United States Senate, appeared at a campaign rally.

=== Reconstruction and the 1924 Lobero Theatre ===
==== Community Arts Association and the Little Theater Movement ====
Following years of declining use and concerns regarding fire safety and earthquake vulnerability, the original Lobero's Theatre stood vacant after its final event in October 1916. As historian Kevin Starr observed, "for the past few years the Opera House had stood condemned, its walls of adobe brick judged unsound."

In 1919, local residents formed the Community Arts Association (CAA) to organize, foster, and support the arts in Santa Barbara. The association's Music Branch later evolved into the Community Arts Music Association (CAMA). In the fall of 1921, planning began for the purchase of the old Lobero Theatre as a home for the CAA's Drama Branch. In February 1922, a group of citizens purchased the property for $25,000 and raised an additional $100,000 to restore the theatre.

The effort to rebuild the Lobero coincided with broader cultural and architectural developments occurring throughout California and the United States during the early twentieth century. During and immediately following World War I, the Little Theatre Movement promoted literary and artistically ambitious amateur theater productions outside the commercial Broadway system. On the West Coast, the movement became closely associated with the Pasadena Playhouse and other community-based performing arts organizations.

The Community Arts Association's plans for the Lobero reflected many of the ideals of the Little Theatre Movement, combining community-based theater with a broader vision for civic and cultural life in Santa Barbara. As plans for the project advanced, the association confronted a practical challenge: the deteriorated condition of the original opera house. After examining the original adobe, brick, and wood structure, architects George Washington Smith and Lutah Maria Riggs determined that a new theater should be constructed on the site rather than remodeling the existing building.

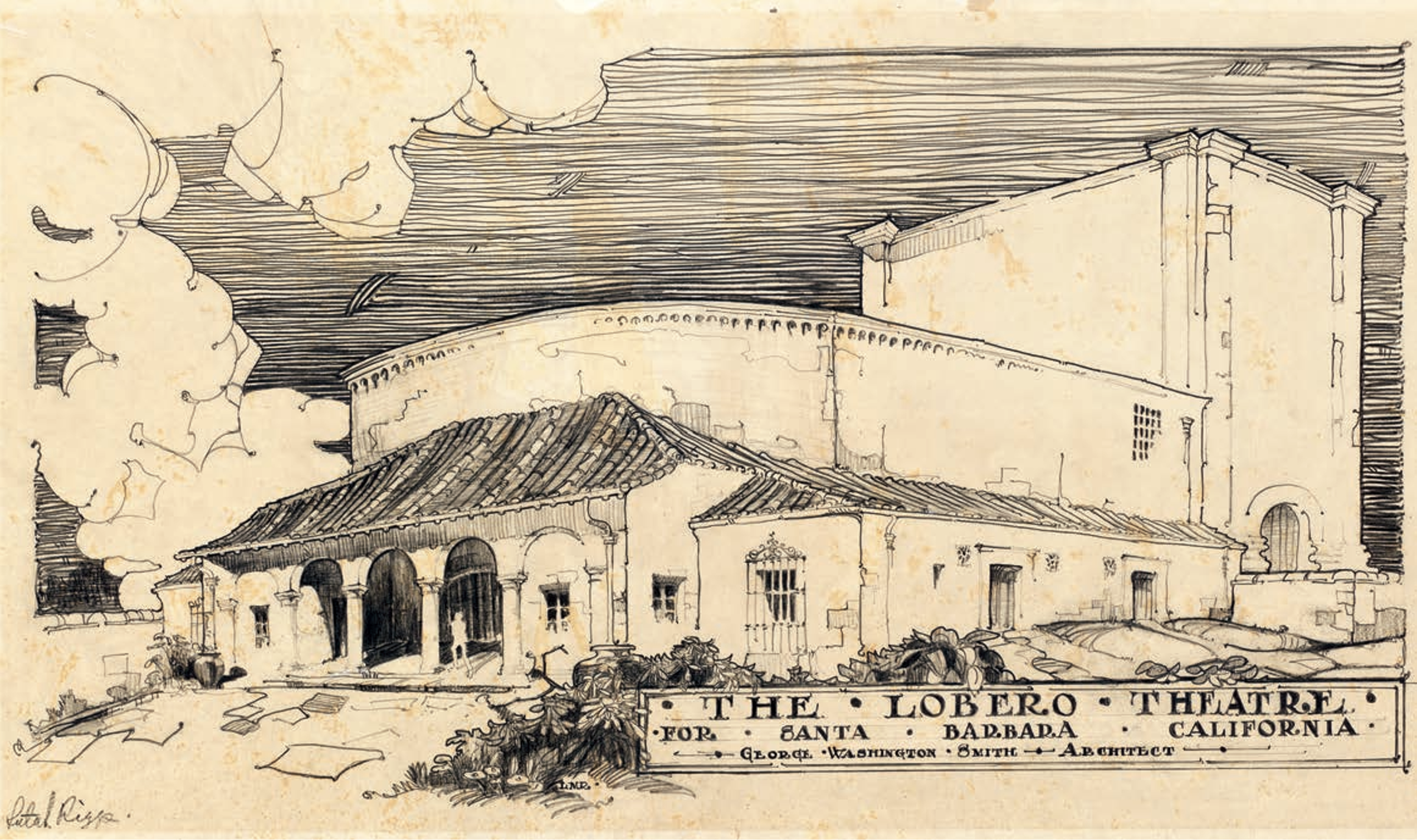
Architectural rendering of the rebuilt Lobero Theatre by Lutah Maria Riggs, c. 1921.

Demolition of the original structure began in early 1923, and construction of the new Lobero Theatre commenced in December 1923.

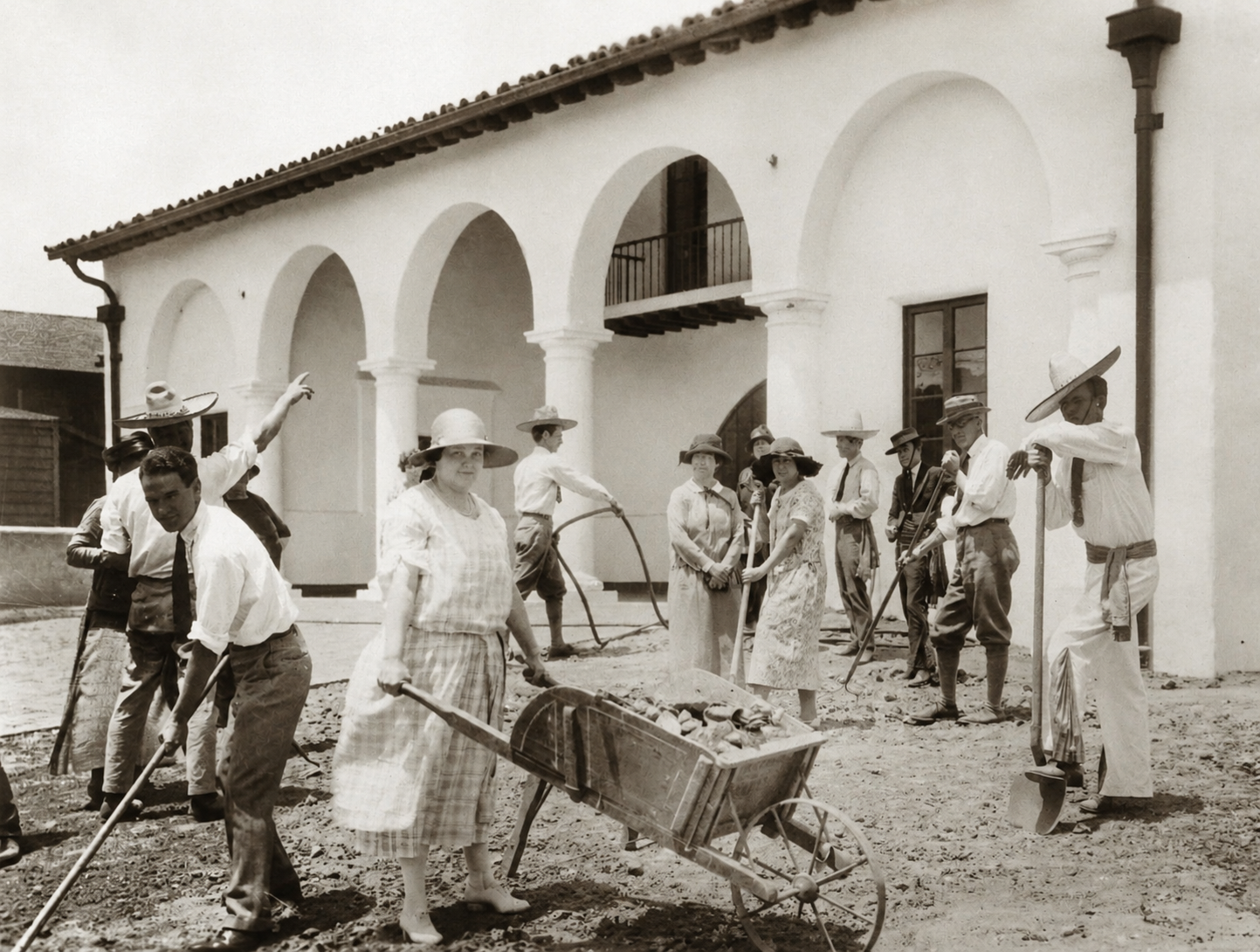
Ceremonial groundbreaking for the rebuilt Lobero Theatre, c. 1922

Riggs served as the project's principal designer and created the theater's decorative ceiling. The ceiling design was inspired by a geometric coffered ceiling at the University of Salamanca in Spain that reflected Islamic influences on medieval and Renaissance Spanish architecture.

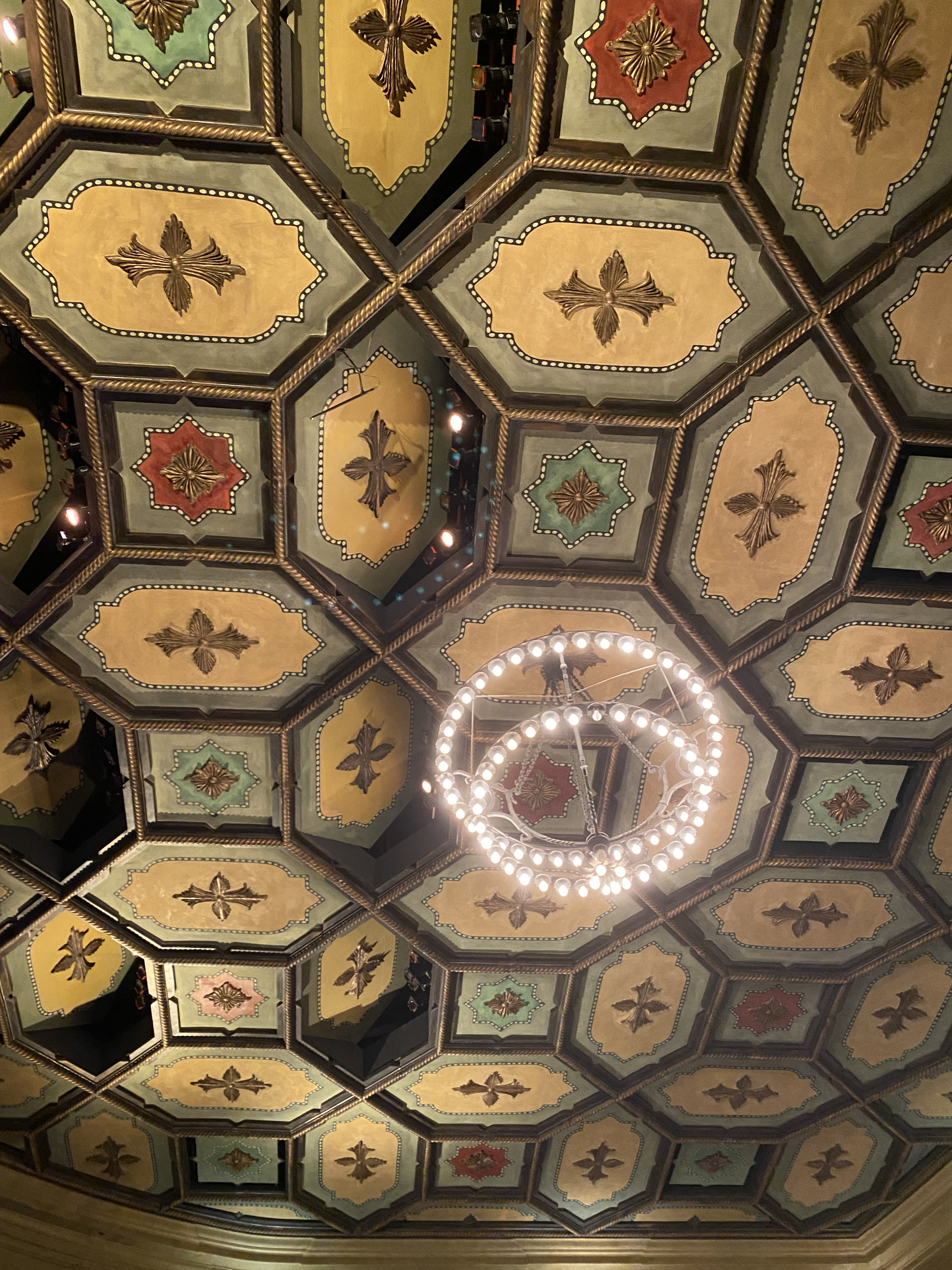
The Lobero Theatre's coffered ceiling, designed by Lutah Maria Riggs and inspired by the University of Salamanca in Spain.

Riggs later became the first woman in California to be named a Fellow of the American Institute of Architects (FAIA).

The new Lobero Theatre opened in August 1924. Constructed on the site of the original opera house, the building incorporated elements associated with Spanish Colonial Revival architecture, including stucco walls, tiled roofs, arched openings, wrought-iron detailing, and an intimate courtyard-oriented design.

The theater's reopening coincided with Santa Barbara's first Old Spanish Days Fiesta in August 1924, an event organized by civic leaders and the Community Arts Association to celebrate the reopening of the Lobero Theatre, promote tourism, and showcase the city's emerging Spanish Colonial Revival identity.

By 1925 the Lobero's national reputation was reflected in The Little Theatre Monthly, which described it as one of the most important little theaters in America.

==== Architecture and the 1925 Earthquake ====
On June 29, 1925, less than a year after the new Lobero Theatre opened, Santa Barbara was struck by a devastating earthquake. Approximately two-thirds of the commercial buildings in the downtown district were damaged, including the rival Potter Theatre. The Lobero Theatre emerged largely unscathed.

Inspired by buildings such as the Lobero Theatre and the neighboring Paseo de la Guerra, Santa Barbara established an Architectural Board of Review—often described as the first such board in the United States—and adopted Spanish Colonial Revival architecture as a guiding theme for rebuilding following the earthquake and for future development throughout the city.

In 2023, Architectural Digest included the Lobero Theatre on its list of the world's eleven most beautiful theaters, citing its Spanish Colonial Revival architecture and its role in shaping Santa Barbara's architectural identity.

==== Theater Previews and Hollywood Connections ====
During the 1920s through the 1940s, the Lobero hosted theatrical premieres and preview performances and featured performers who later became associated with Classical Hollywood cinema.

The 1926 Lobero production of Lucky Sam Carver featured actress Pauline Frederick alongside a 25-year-old Clark Gable in one of his early professional acting roles.

In 1932, the Lobero staged The Mad Hopes, starring the young Humphrey Bogart.

In 1941, the Lobero presented Anna Christie, starring Ingrid Bergman in a production directed by John Houseman. Contemporary accounts reported that opening-night attendees included film figures such as Charlie Chaplin and Alfred Hitchcock.

== Performing Arts ==
=== Jazz ===
The Lobero Theatre has presented jazz and popular music performances since the 1920s. The tradition began in August 1926, when a 23-year-old Bing Crosby appeared at the theater in the Lobero's first—and likely only—midnight matinee. Crosby and his high school friend Al Rinker were members of a 45-person music hall revue, although the Santa Barbara Daily News misspelled Crosby's name as "Corsey" in its coverage of the performance.

Beginning in the 1950s, the theater regularly presented major jazz performers associated with the West Coast jazz movement, including Dave Brubeck, Shorty Rogers, and Shelly Manne.

In 2026, the Lobero Theatre was featured in DownBeat magazine's Great Venues Guide.

=== Classical Music and Opera ===
Throughout the twentieth century, the Lobero Theatre became an important venue for classical music and opera in Santa Barbara through its longstanding association with the Community Arts Music Association (CAMA).

The theater hosted performances by many of the twentieth century's leading classical musicians, including Igor Stravinsky, Sergei Rachmaninoff, Jascha Heifetz, and Vladimir Horowitz, among others.

The theater also hosted performances by prominent African American concert artists during an era when many American cultural institutions remained racially segregated. Paul Robeson performed at the Lobero in 1931, and Marian Anderson appeared at the theater in 1938. Anderson's appearance occurred one year before her widely publicized 1939 concert at the Lincoln Memorial, following the refusal of the Daughters of the American Revolution to permit her to perform at Constitution Hall.

=== Singer-Songwriters and Contemporary Music Programming ===
In 1997, following the closure of the Lobero Stage Company, the theater entered a new phase in its history, placing greater emphasis on music, film, lectures, and other live performances.

In September 1997, music producer Peggie Jones founded the Sings Like Hell concert series at the Lobero Theatre with an inaugural performance by American singer-songwriter and guitarist Peter Case. The subscription-based series focused on both emerging and established singer-songwriters and became one of the Lobero's best-known contemporary music programs. The series remained at the theater for eighteen years, concluding in 2015.

In the early twenty-first century, the theater continued to present contemporary singer-songwriters and popular music performers, including Patti Smith, Cat Power, and Jack Johnson (musician).

== Golden Eagle ==
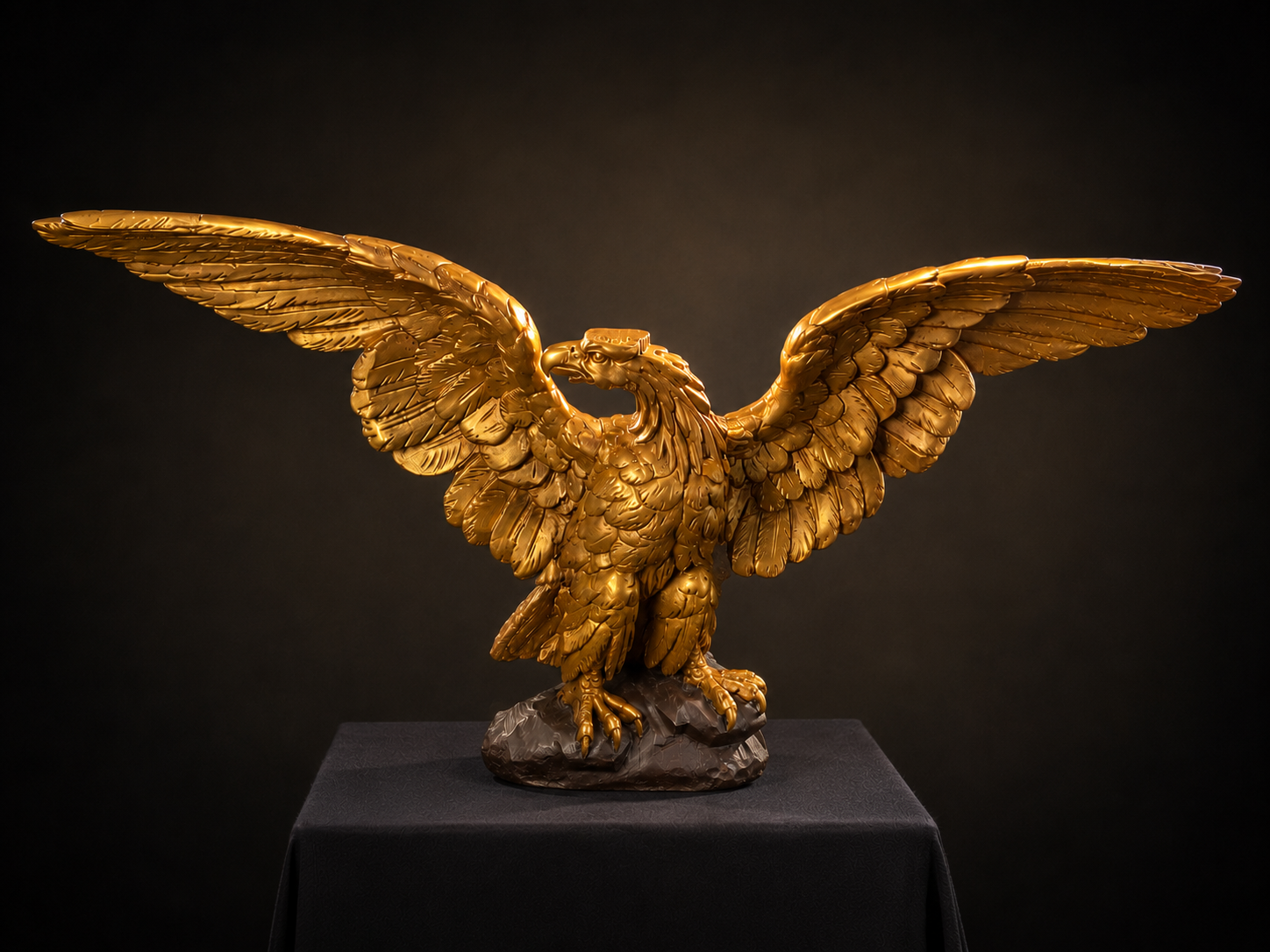
The restored Lobero Golden Eagle, unveiled during the theater's 150th anniversary celebrations in 2023.

The "Lobero Golden Eagle" is a carved and gilded wooden eagle associated with the original Lobero Opera House and regarded as one of the theater's most significant historic artifacts.

The eagle originally adorned the wheelhouse of the side-wheel steamer Yankee Blade, built in 1853 for Cornelius Vanderbilt's shipping line during the California Gold Rush.

In October 1854, the Yankee Blade wrecked near Point Pedernales along the Santa Barbara County coast. Several months later, the eagle was discovered floating near Santa Rosa Island and eventually arrived in Santa Barbara. According to longstanding local accounts, it was traded to José Lobero's saloon for five dollars and a bottle of whiskey.

When Lobero's Opera House opened in 1873, the eagle was mounted above the theater's proscenium arch, where it remained for several decades. After the original opera house closed and was later demolished, the eagle disappeared from public view.

In 1960, historian Walker A. Tompkins helped identify the artifact atop the entrance gate of a ranch in the Santa Barbara area, where it had been placed by turkey farmer Mary Kinevan after she purchased it at auction in 1929. The eagle was later donated to the Santa Barbara Historical Museum.

Prior to the theater's 150th anniversary celebration in 2023, the eagle underwent extensive conservation and restoration work. It is now displayed in the Lobero Theatre lobby.

== Selected notable performers and speakers ==
Over its history, the Lobero Theatre has hosted notable performers, speakers, and public figures including:

- 1896 – John Philip Sousa
- 1896 – Susan B. Anthony
- 1902 – W. C. Fields
- 1903 – Carrie Nation
- 1926 – Bing Crosby
- 1926 – Clark Gable
- 1926 – Roland Hayes
- 1926 – Ruth St. Denis
- 1929 – Béla Lugosi
- 1929 – Sergei Rachmaninoff
- 1929 – Will Durant
- 1930 – Jascha Heifetz
- 1930 – Vladimir Horowitz
- 1931 – Paul Robeson
- 1932 – Humphrey Bogart
- 1935 – Leopold Stokowski
- 1936 – Lotte Lehmann
- 1936 – Martha Graham
- 1937 – Igor Stravinsky
- 1938 – Marian Anderson
- 1939 – Isaac Stern
- 1940 – Arthur Rubinstein
- 1941 – Eugene O’Neill
- 1941 – Ingrid Bergman
- 1943 – Yehudi Menuhin
- 1945 – Andrés Segovia
- 1945 – Orson Welles
- 1947 – Lucille Ball
- 1948 – Darius Milhaud
- 1949 – Elia Kazan
- 1950 – Margaret Mead
- 1953 – Dave Brubeck
- 1954 – W. H. Auden
- 1955 – Aldous Huxley
- 1955 – John Cage
- 1955 – Merce Cunningham
- 1956 – Frank Lloyd Wright
- 1957 – Alan Watts
- 1957 – Linus Pauling
- 1961 – Odetta
- 1962 – Joan Baez
- 1962 – Sarah Vaughan
- 1971 – Richard Pryor
- 1974 – Tom Stoppard
- 1977 – Tom Waits
- 1980 – Itzhak Perlman
- 1988 – James Stewart
- 1989 – Dizzy Gillespie
- 1989 – Marcel Marceau
- 1990 – Edward Albee
- 1992 – Ladysmith Black Mambazo
- 1998 – Tracy Chapman
- 1998 – Mikhail Baryshnikov
- 2000 – Herbie Hancock
- 2000 – Wynton Marsalis
- 2001 – Philip Glass
- 2002 – Jackson Browne
- 2005 – Kate Winslet
- 2009 – Yo-Yo Ma
- 2010 – James Cameron
- 2010 – Quentin Tarantino
- 2018 – Neil Young
- 2023 – Patti Smith
- 2025 – Marina Abramović
- 2026 – The Wallflowers
