= Nir Kabaretti =

Israeli orchestra conductor (born 1968)

Nir Kabaretti (Hebrew: ניר קברטי; born February 5, 1968, in Holon) is an Israeli orchestra conductor.

Kabaretti is music director of the Santa Barbara Symphony in California since 2006 and the Southwest Florida Symphony Orchestra since 2015. In 2018 he was appointed music director of The Israel Sinfonietta Beersheba.

== Early career ==
Kabaretti made his conducting debut with the Israel Symphony Orchestra Rishon LeZion in 1993. Upon graduation from the prestigious University of Music and Performing Arts in Vienna, Kabaretti was appointed chorus master of the Vienna State Opera and the Salzburg Festival. He served as assistant to the music director of Teatro Real in Madrid, and as Zubin Mehta’s personal assistant and conductor at Teatro del Maggio Musicale Fiorentino. In 2004, Kabaretti made his Teatro alla Scala di Milano debut in Tchaikowsky’s The Nutcracker, and in 2007 he returned to La Scala for Mendelssohn’s Ballet Midsummer Night’s Dream.

== Symphonic Experience ==
Nir Kabaretti conducted the Israel Philharmonic Orchestra, Orchestra del Maggio Musicale Fiorentino, Orchestra del Teatro dell’Opera di Roma, Tokyo Philharmonic Orchestra, Orquesta Filarmonica de Buenos Aires, Orchestre national du Capitole de Toulouse, Orchestra del Teatro Carlo Felice di Genova, Orchestra Sinfonica di Milano Giuseppe Verdi, Zagreb Philharmonic Orchestra, Belgrad Philharmonic Orchestra, Jerusalem Symphony Orchestra, Israel Symphony Orchestra Rishon LeZion, Haifa Symphony Orchestra, Vienna Chamber Orchestra, Niederösterreichisches Tonkünstlerorchester, Orquesta Sinfonica de Madrid, Orquesta Filarmonica de Gran Canaria, Orquesta Sinfónica Metropolitana de Lisboa, Bochumer Symphoniker, among others. He was also appointed Principal Conductor of the Ra'anana Symphonette Orchestra in Israel in 2002 and as its music director until 2008.

== Operatic Experience ==
Kabaretti's operatic experience includes productions at the Maggio Musicale Fiorentino ( Die Entführung aus dem Serail, Macbeth, Il Trovatore, Gianni Schicchi, Il viaggio a Reims), Teatro Real in Madrid ( Cenerentola, Die Walküre ), The Israeli Opera ( Fidelio, Manon Lescaut ), Lausanne Opera ( Nino Rota's Il Cappello di Paglia di Firenze, Die Fledermaus), Avenches Opera Festival Nabucco, The Barber of Seville, Madama Butterfly) and The New National Theatre in Tokyo (The Barber of Seville). He also conducted The Diary of Anne Frank by Fried, a visiting production of the Vienna State Opera, at both the Bregenz Festival and at Expo 2000 in Hannover.

== Awards ==
Kabaretti was awarded the 1993 Forum Junger Künstler Conducting Competition Award (Vienna). He became finalist of the 1994 Competition for Conductors (Douai, France) and was awarded the America Israel Cultural Foundation Grant for Young Conductors between 1989 and 1992.

Nir Kabaretti is fluent in English, German, Italian, Spanish and Hebrew. He lives in Santa Barbara, CA with his wife Gaja Hubbard and their two children.
