= Guillermo Perich =

Cuban violinist

Guillermo Perich is a Cuban violinist. He has worked with the Baltimore Symphony Orchestra, the Annapolis Symphony Orchestra, the Havana Philharmonic, the Mischakoff Quartet, the Walden Quartet, the Saint Louis String Quartet, and as a violist with the Baltimore String Quartet. He has also performed at the Chautauqua Music Festival and the Aspen Music Festival. He retired after 20 years of teaching at the University of Illinois school of music, Urbana, Illinois. In his career, he has traveled and taught in at least 25 of the 50 states as well as in Spain, Germany, Austria, and Switzerland.
