= Community Arts Music Association =

Arts organization in Santa Barbara, California

Community Arts Music Association (CAMA) of Santa Barbara is the oldest arts organization in Santa Barbara, California, United States.

CAMA began in the fall of 1919 when a group of community-minded Santa Barbarans came together in the years following World War I to create the Civic Music Committee. Their goal was to present musical performances, beginning with the new Los Angeles Philharmonic, founded by philanthropist William Andrews Clark, Jr. that same year. The group's work was taken over by the Community Arts Association's Music Branch in 1926, which in time evolved into today's Community Arts Music Association.

Since the 1920s, CAMA has presented such artists as Pablo Casals, Sergei Rachmaninoff, Vladimir Horowitz, Jascha Heifetz, Igor Stravinsky, Artur Schnabel, Isaac Stern and Marian Anderson, with yearly performances from the Los Angeles Philharmonic. Since the 1950s, the orchestra series has expanded and now includes concerts by a variety of orchestras, from the New York Philharmonic to the Royal Concertgebouw Orchestra.
