= Gisèle Ben-Dor =

Israeli-American orchestra conductor

- ג'יזל בן-דור
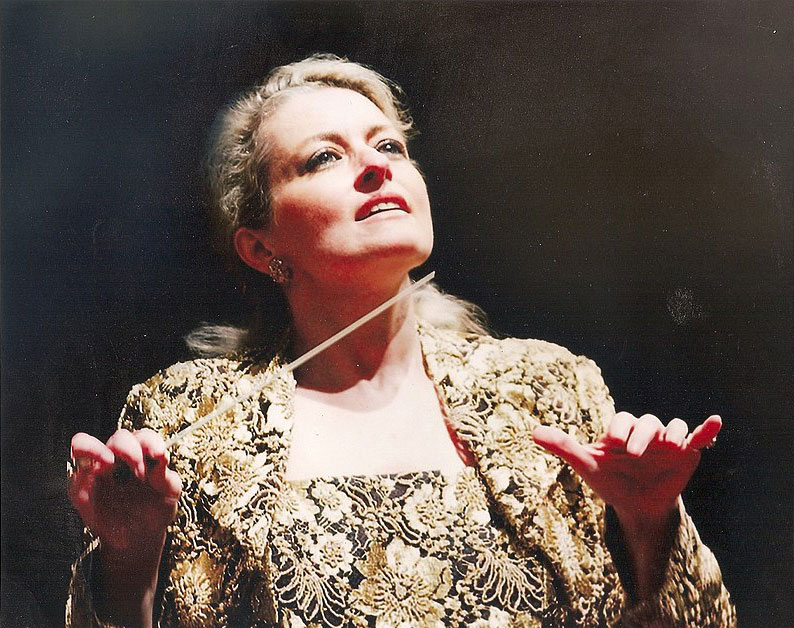
- Born: Gisèle Buka; 26 April 1955 (age 71); Montevideo, Uruguay
- Occupation: Conductor
- Website: giseleben-dor.com

Gisèle Ben-Dor (Hebrew: ג'יזל בן-דור; née Buka; born 26 April 1955) is a Uruguayan-American-Israeli orchestra conductor.

== Conductor ==
Ben-Dor was born in Montevideo, Uruguay, to Polish Jewish immigrant parents. She graduated from the Rubin Academy of Music, Tel Aviv University, and the Yale School of Music, also studying with Mendi Rodan in Jerusalem. She made her conducting debut with the Israel Philharmonic Orchestra in Stravinsky's "The Rite of Spring", televised and broadcast by the BBC/London throughout Europe and Israel. As an active guest conductor worldwide and American music director, Gisele Ben Dor has had a crucial role in the rejuvenation and promotion of the art music of Latin America, which she performs in concerts, festivals and recordings. Ms. Ben-Dor's talent was recognized early by Leonard Bernstein, with whom she shared the stage at Tanglewood and at the Schleswig-Holstein Music Festivals. Since then, she served as the music director of the Santa Barbara Symphony Orchestra, the Boston Pro-Arte Chamber Orchestra and the Annapolis Symphony Orchestra, as well as Resident Conductor of the Houston Symphony and the Louisville Orchestra. She has led the New York Philharmonic, London Symphony Orchestra, Los Angeles Philharmonic, BBC National Orchestra of Wales, Helsinki Philharmonic, Minnesota Orchestra, Houston Symphony, Orchestre de la Suisse Romande, New World Symphony, Rotterdam Philharmonic, Seoul Philharmonic, Israel Philharmonic, Israel Chamber Orchestra, New Israeli Opera, Jerusalem Symphony Orchestra, additional orchestras in the Netherlands, several orchestras in France (Ille de France, Lille, Cannes, Montpelier, Metz, Picardy), Italy, Spain, Australia and South America amongst many others worldwide. Maestro Ben-Dor is currently Conductor Laureate of the Santa Barbara Symphony Orchestra and Conductor Emerita of the Boston Pro-Arte Chamber Orchestra, a post to which she was elected exclusively by the musicians and which she returns often as guest conductor. A winner of the Bártok Prize of Hungarian Television, Ms. Ben-Dor has also conducted several Eastern European orchestras in Hungary, Czechoslovakia, the former Yugoslavia, and Bulgaria.

== Work with Latin American music ==
Uruguayan by birth and upbringing, Gisele Ben-Dor is a supporter of Latin American music, particularly the works of Ginastera, Villa-Lobos, Revueltas, Piazzolla, and Luis Bacalov. Most recently her recording of world premieres by Piazzolla/Mosalini with Boston Pro-Arte Chamber Orchestra in a centenary tribute to Piazzolla ( ‘Cien Años” One Hundred Years) has garnered numerous reviews. Working with Georgina Ginastera, the composer's daughter, she created the “Tango and Malambo Festival “a wide-ranging ten-day feast of concerts, dance, and film celebrating the tango and the less familiar Malambo.

She also created the Revueltas Festival, showcasing every aspect of the Mexican composer’s music. Her major performances of Ginastera’s works include a new production and European premiere of his last opera, Beatrix Cenci, at the Grand Théâtre de Genève, as well as Turbae ad Passionem Gregorianam in Madrid, also a European premiere. She has recorded several other CD’s of music of Latin American composers, all including world premiere recordings, and more are to be released, most notably a recording of Ginastera’s last opera, as well as another recording of Bartok’s music.

== Posts ==
- Conductor Laureate, Santa Barbara Symphony Orchestra, 2006–present
- Music Director, Santa Barbara Symphony Orchestra, 1994–2006
- Conductor Emerita, Boston Pro -Arte Chamber Orchestra, 2000–present
- Music Director, Boston Pro -Arte Chamber Orchestra, 1991–2000
- Artistic Advisor, World Piano Competition, Cincinnati, 1996, 1997, 2006, 2008, 2009
- Music Director, Annapolis Symphony, 1991 – 97
- New York Philharmonic Orchestra, Assistant to Music Director Kurt Masur, 1992–2002
- Resident Conductor, Houston Symphony Orchestra, 1988 – 91, and Assistant Conductor to Music Director Christoph Eschenbach
- Assistant Conductor, Louisville Orchestra ( Ky), 1987–88
- Music Director, Norwalk Youth Symphony, Connecticut, 1984–87
- Music Director, Institute "Ivria", Montevideo, Uruguay, 1969–1973

== Recordings ==
- Piazzolla and Mosalini “Cien Años”, “One Hundred Years”, with the Boston Pro-Arte Chamber Orchestra
- Alberto Ginastera, Excerpts from the opera "Don Rodrigo" (world premiere), Cantata “Milena”, Five Popular Argentine Songs (orchestral version of Cinco Canciones Populares Argentinas, op.10, by Shimon Cohen, world premiere), Santa Barbara Symphony, with Plácido Domingo, Virginia Tola and Ana Maria Martinez (EMI, Paris)
- Soul of Tango, world premiere works by Ástor Piazzolla and Luis Bacalov. Santa Barbara Symphony Orchestra, with Juanjo Mosalini, Virginia Tola and Luis Bacalov (Delos)
- Alberto Ginastera, "Estancia" – complete ballet (world premiere), "Panambi" – complete ballet. London Symphony Orchestra, with Luis Gaeta. (Conifer)The album was a Grammy nominee, and has been reissued by Naxos.
- Alberto Ginastera, “Glosses on Themes of Pablo Casals”, both full orchestra and string versions (world premiere) and “Variaciones Concertantes”. London Symphony Orchestra, Israel Chamber Orchestra (Koch International, reissued by Naxos)
- Alberto Ginastera, "Ollantay", "Popol-Vuh", Suite of Native Dances (orchestral version of Suite de Danzas Criollas, op. 15, by Shimon Cohen, world premiere) and Suites from "Estancia" and "Panambi". BBC Orchestra of Wales, Jerusalem Symphony Orchestra, London Symphony Orchestra (Naxos)
- Silvestre Revueltas, "La Coronela" – ballet (world premiere), "Itinerarios", "Colorines", Santa Barbara Symphony Orchestra, English Chamber Orchestra (Koch International)
- Béla Bartók, "For Children", Divertimento, Romanian Folk Dances. Sofia Soloists Chamber Orchestra (Centaur Records)
- Ezra Sims, (CRI), Boston Pro-Arte Chamber Orchestra

== Personal life ==
Born and raised in Uruguay to a family of Polish Jewish immigrants, she studied at the Rubin Academy of Music in Tel-Aviv and at the Yale School of Music before residing in the United States. She became an American citizen in 2000.

In 2021, Ben-Dor was named by Carnegie Corporation of New York as an honoree of the Great Immigrants Award.
