= Yardi Systems =

Software vendor in California, US

Yardi Systems, Inc.
- Type: Private
- Industry: Technology, Property Management, Real estate
- Founded: 1984; 42 years ago
- Headquarters: Santa Barbara, California, U.S.
- Key people: Anant Yardi (CEO)
- Number of employees: approx. 10000 (2025 estimate)
- Subsidiaries: WeWork Inc. 60%
- ASN: 16789
- Website: yardi.com

Yardi Systems, Inc. is an investment, asset and property management software vendor for the real estate industry. It provides products such as property management platforms and software.

== History ==
Yardi Systems was founded by IIT Delhi alumnus, Anant Yardi in Santa Barbara, California. In 2010, Yardi Systems launched Yardi CRM, as part of the company's suite of property management software and integrated it with its own product, Yardi Voyager, a platform designed for real estate management. The year also marked the acquisition of online real estate database, PropertyShark.

In 2011, Yardi launched RentCafe.com (formerly RENTCafé), an apartment renting and online leasing platform that allows renters in the U.S. and Canada to search for apartments, submit rental applications and sign leases.

By 2017, Yardi Systems would expand to 35 offices worldwide, keeping its headquarters in the United States.

In 2021, Yardi Systems acquired and redesigned listing service 42Floors.com adding it to its marketplace network, CommercialEdge.

In 2024, Yardi Systems acquired a 60% equity stake in WeWork.

In September 2025, Yardi Systems announced that Rob Teel will become CEO, replacing founder Anant Yardi in January 2026.

In September 2026, Sidero Labs announced they joined Yardi.
