= La Cumbre Plaza =

Shopping center in Santa Barbara, California

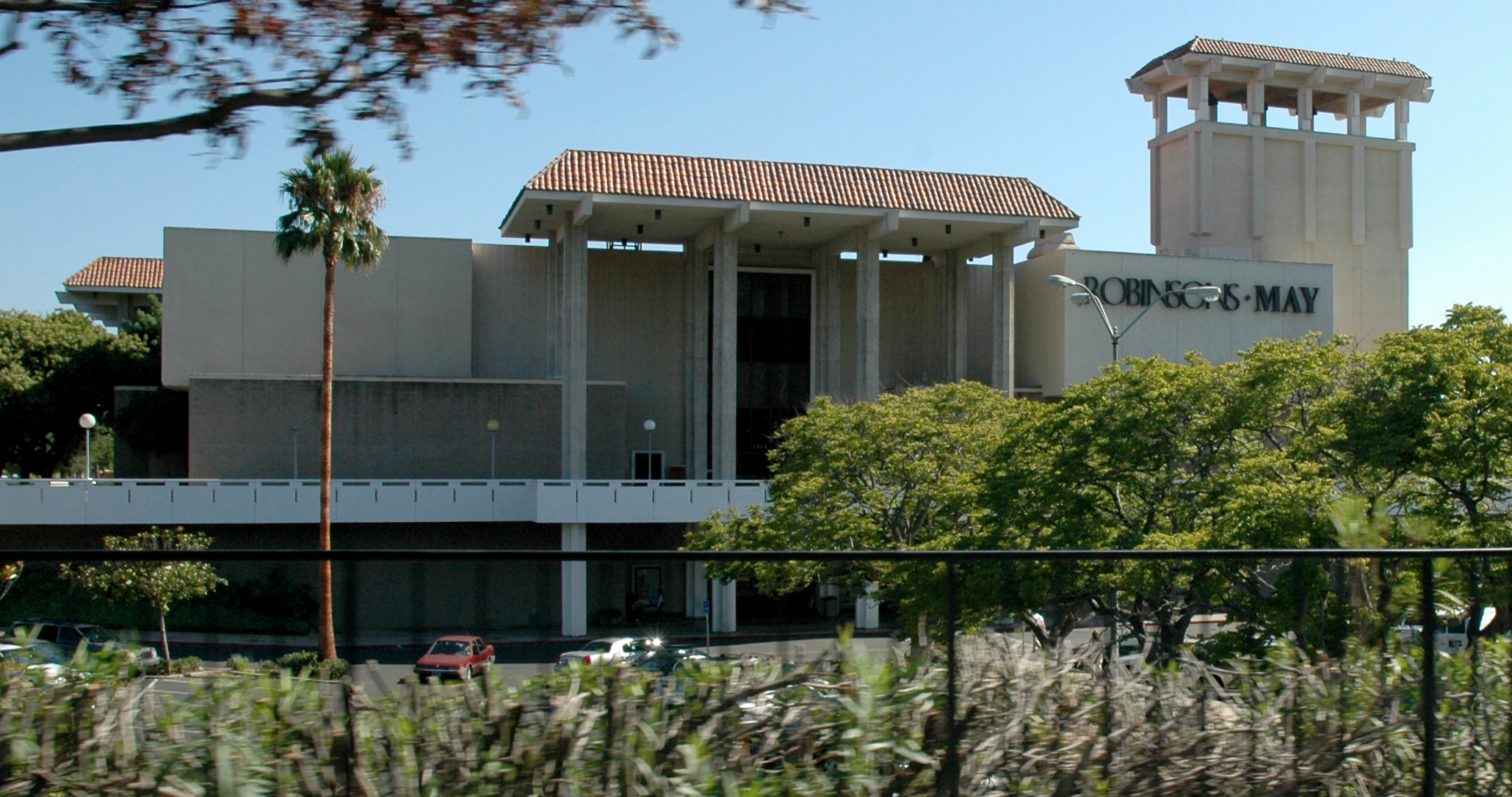
- Location: Santa Barbara, California, United States
- Coordinates: 34.438583°N 119.748803°W
- Address: 121 South Hope Avenue
- Opened: 1967
- Developer: The Hahn Company
- Manager: Macerich
- Num. of stores: 50+
- Num. of anchor tenants: 2 (1 open, 1 vacant)
- Floor area: 491,000 sq ft (45,600 m^{2})
- Floors: 1
- Parking: Outdoor
- Website: shoplacumbre.com

La Cumbre Plaza is an outdoor shopping center located in Santa Barbara, California. The first property built by The Hahn Company, La Cumbre Plaza opened in 1967 and was purchased by Macerich in 2004. Macerich now holds a long-term lease, which goes through 2077 without ownership of the 31-acre site (13 ha). The shopping center spans 491,000 sq ft (45,600 m^{2}) and is anchored by a Macy's.

== History ==
La Cumbre Plaza opened in 1967 with anchors Sears and J.W. Robinson's.

Robinson's changed nameplates twice in its history, first becoming Robinsons-May in 1993, then Macy's in 2006 due to the merger of Federated and May Department Stores.

In the mid-2000s Macerich embarked on a remodel that added upscale retailers including Williams Sonoma, Tiffany & Co., Louis Vuitton and Ruth's Chris Steak House. The remodel was at the height of the Great Recession, causing several of these new tenants to close only a few years later. Others have thrived since the remodel including Pottery Barn.

On November 8, 2018, it was announced that Sears will be closing this location in early 2019 a part of a plan to close 40 stores. The store closed in February 2019. With the property owners planning for redevelopment, Macy’s will close by 2028.
