= Black conductors =

Black musical ensemble leaders

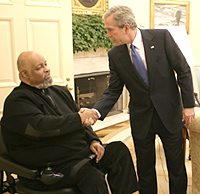
James DePreist (1936–2013), one of the first African-American conductors on the world stage, is congratulated by President George W. Bush after receiving the National Medal of Arts in 2005.

Black conductors are musicians of African, Caribbean, African-American ancestry and other members of the African diaspora who are musical ensemble leaders who direct classical music performances, such as an orchestral or choral concerts, or jazz ensemble big band concerts by way of visible gestures with the hands, arms, face and head. Conductors of African descent are rare, as the vast majority are male and white.

== History ==
=== 20th century ===
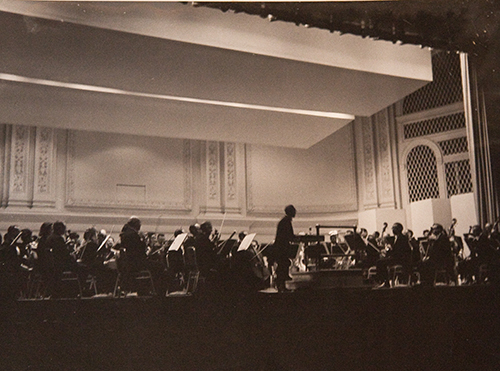
Benjamin Steinberg conducting the premiere concert of the US's first racially integrated orchestra, the Symphony of the New World at Carnegie Hall on May 6, 1965

In the early 1930s, African-American conductor Dean Dixon (1915–1976) found that his pursuit of conducting engagements was stifled because of racial bias. As a result, he formed his own orchestra and choral society in 1931. In 1940, three conductors: African Americans Everett Lee and Dean Dixon, and Jewish American Benjamin Steinberg "...attempted to circumvent the institutionalised racism in American classical music by forming an orchestra of black musicians. But the project failed for financial reasons..." Steinberg established an orchestra of 36 black and 52 white musicians, when he formed the Symphony of the New World in 1964. It was the first fully racially integrated orchestra in the US, and held its premiere concert at Carnegie Hall on May 6, 1965.

In 1945, Everett Lee was the "first African American to conduct a major Broadway production". Leonard Bernstein asked Lee to conduct On the Town, which marked the "first time a black conductor led an all-white production". In 1953, Lee was the "first black musician to conduct a white symphony orchestra in the south of the States...in Louisville, Kentucky". In 1955, Lee was the "first musician of colour to conduct a major opera company in the US with a performance of La traviata at the New York City Opera". In 1955 William Grant Still conducted the New Orleans Philharmonic Orchestra and became the first African American to conduct a major orchestra in the Deep South of the US. Henry Lewis (1932–1996) was the first African American to lead a major symphony orchestra. He made his Metropolitan Opera debut in 1972. Lewis found it hard to "...take on the role of an authoritarian conductor, because such a role was unacceptable for a black man" at this time.

In the early 1950s, impresario Arthur Judson, head of Columbia Artists Management told Everett Lee that despite Lee's excellent reviews for conducting, a black conductor could not conduct a white orchestra in the US. Judson stated that black instrumentalists could play solo concertos with white orchestras, dance in white productions and sing in white productions, but leading a white orchestra was not feasible. In 1969, James Frazier won the Cantelli Prize in Italy, and in the 1970s went on to conduct several important orchestras, including the Detroit Symphony Orchestra, the Philadelphia Orchestra, London's New Philharmonic Symphony Orchestra, the Spanish Radio and Television Symphony Orchestra, the Belarusian State Philharmonic and the Saint Petersburg Philharmonic Orchestra. Frazier, however, died young in 1981, just after being named conductor of the Bogota Symphony.

Isaiah Jackson (born 1945) was the first black principal conductor of The Royal Ballet, Covent Garden, in 1986, and became its music director 1987–90.

=== 21st century ===
According to a 2004 article in The Guardian, "black conductors are rare in the classical music world and even in symphony orchestras it is unusual to see more than one or two black musicians." Canadian-born black conductor Kwamé Ryan, who studied music at Cambridge University and in Germany, made his professional conducting debut in 2004. Ryan says the "...message given to young, black people, particularly in North America, was... that you can be a star athlete; you can be a pop star...[but the] possibility for black children [to become a conductor] is not encouraged in schools or in the media." Ryan states that young blacks have a lack of "...exposure [to black conductor role models] and it is a deficit that is passed on from generation to generation". Ryan said he has "no optimism for the future". In the United Kingdom, the research by Scott Caizley argues how through the systemic removal of quality music education in UK state schools, many young people are losing opportunities which is contributing to fewer black, Asian and minority ethnic (BAME) young people participating in classical music.

== Notable individuals ==
=== Classical music ===
Historically, the vast majority of classical music conductors have been Caucasian. However, there are a small number of notable conductors who are of African, Caribbean or African-American ancestry. Contemporary Black conductors still comprise a small percentage of the conductors working today and are often overlooked for positions as chief conductors of major orchestras.

- Charles-Richard Lambert (died 1862) was a black American musician, conductor and music educator. He and his family were noted for talent in music and gained international acclaim. He worked as a music teacher and was a conductor for the Philharmonic Society, the first non-theatrical orchestra in New Orleans. One of his notable students was Edmond Dédé.

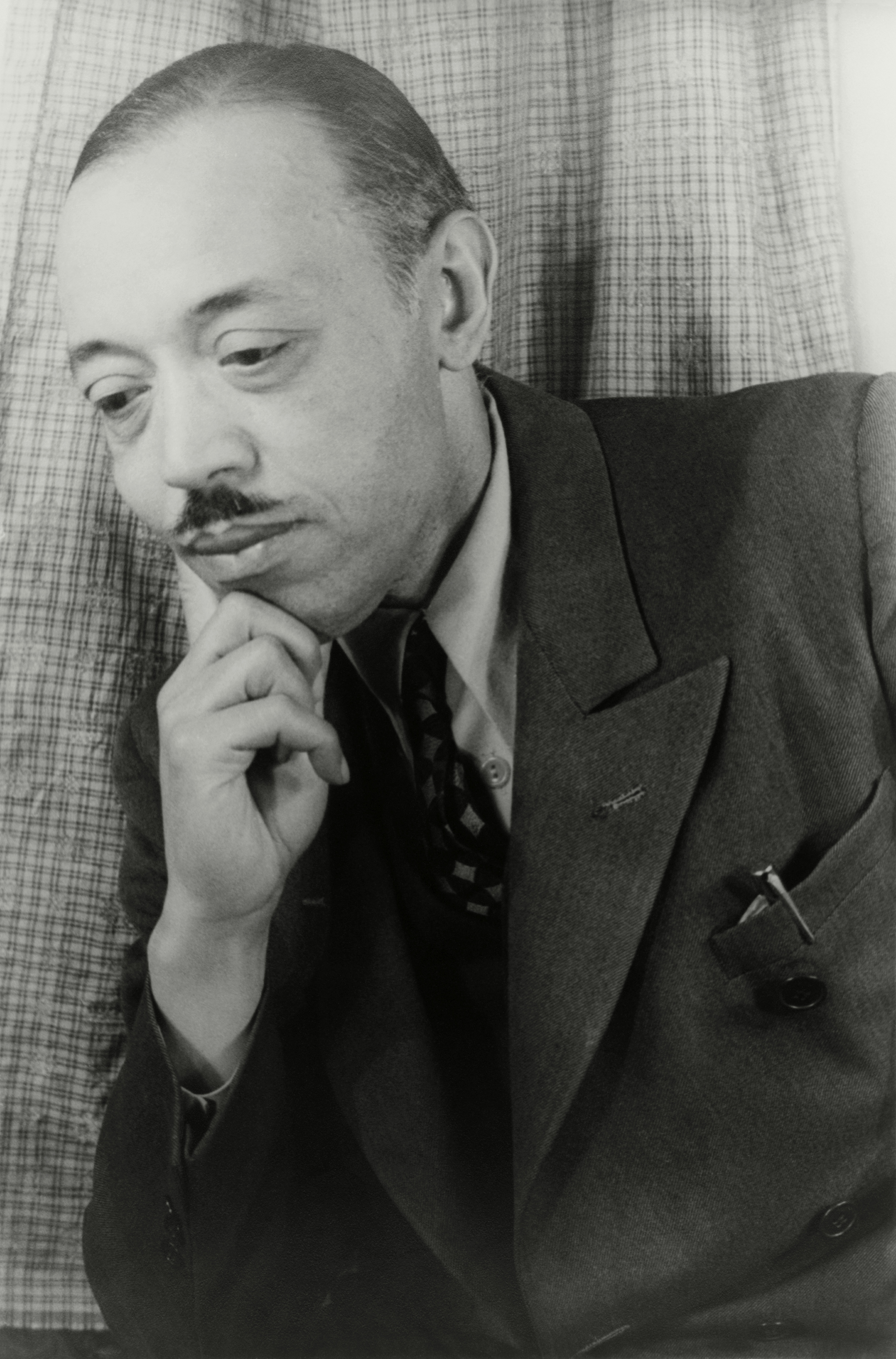
William Grant Still (1895–1978) was one of the first African Americans to conduct a major American symphony orchestra in the Deep South.

- William Grant Still (1895–1978) was one of the first African Americans to conduct a major American symphony orchestra in the Deep South, the first to have a symphony (his first symphony) performed by a leading orchestra, the first to have an opera performed by a major opera company, and the first to have an opera performed on national television. As a classical composer, he wrote more than 150 compositions. After finishing college, he won a scholarship to study at the Oberlin Conservatory of Music. Between 1919 and 1921, he worked as an arranger for W. C. Handy's band. In the 1930s, he arranged music for many films. In 1955 he conducted the New Orleans Philharmonic Orchestra and became the first African American to conduct a major orchestra in the Deep South.
- Leonard De Paur (1914–1998) attended the Juilliard School and Columbia University. He was a student of the composer Henry Cowell and the conductor Pierre Monteux. From 1932 to 1936 he was the assistant conductor of the Hall Johnson Choir. He served as music director with the Federal Negro Theatre from 1936 until 1939 while collaborating with a young Orson Welles. From 1947 to 1968, he conducted more than 2,000 performances with such groups as: the De Paur Infantry Chorus, the De Paur Opera Gala, the De Paur Gala and the De Paur Chorus which toured in 18 African nations for the United States Information Agency. He was also a regular conductor of Symphony of the New World and Opera South. In the realm of network television he was an arranger and conductor for such noted programs as The Bell Telephone Hour and the Hallmark Hall of Fame. He is credited with establishing the Lincoln Center Out of Doors Festival and was the director of Community Relations at Lincoln Center for 17 years. He received honorary doctorates from Lewis And Clark and Morehouse College.
- Dean Dixon (1915–1976) studied conducting with Albert Stoessel at the Juilliard School and Columbia University. When early pursuits of conducting engagements were stifled because of racial bias (he was African-American), he formed his own orchestra and choral society in 1931. In 1941, he guest-conducted the NBC Symphony Orchestra, and the New York Philharmonic during its summer season. He later guest-conducted the Philadelphia Orchestra and Boston Symphony Orchestra. In 1948 he won the Ditson Conductor's Award. Dixon was honoured by the American Society of Composers, Authors and Publishers (ASCAP) with the Award of Merit for encouraging the participation of American youth in music. In 1948, Dixon was awarded the Alice M. Ditson award for distinguished service to American music.
- Everett Lee (1916–2022) "was [a]...violinist who led the orchestra in the original Broadway production of Carmen Jones and played the oboe on stage in the country club scene". In 1945, he was the "first African American to conduct a major Broadway production". Leonard Bernstein asked Lee to conduct On the Town, which marked the "first time a black conductor led an all-white production". In 1946, Lee won a Koussevitzky Music Foundation Award to conduct at Tanglewood. In 1952, he was appointed director of the opera department at Columbia University and was also awarded a Fulbright scholarship that allowed him to travel to Europe. In 1953, Lee was the "first black musician to conduct a white symphony orchestra in the south of the States...in Louisville, Kentucky". In 1955, he was the "first musician of colour to conduct a major opera company in the US with a performance of La traviata at the New York City Opera". He was appointed chief conductor of the Norrköping Symphony Orchestra in Sweden in 1962. In 1976, he conducted the New York Philharmonic for the first time, and he performed a piece by African-American composer David Baker for Martin Luther King Jr.'s birthday. In 1979, he became music director of the Bogotá Philharmonic Orchestra in Colombia.
- George Byrd (1926–2010) studied at Juilliard from 1947, but because of discrimination moved to the Paris Conservatory in 1951. On recommendation from Hans Knappertsbusch he got a guest spot with the Munich Philharmonic and throughout Europe. His career was further enhanced after attending a master class of Herbert von Karajan. But due to discrimination in Europe, he sought and gained a position in Addis Ababa, Ethiopia, where he founded the Ethiopian Symphony Orchestra and a conservatory. In addition to the many European languages that he already spoke, he acquired some Amharic there. Byrd conducted the American Ballet Theatre in 1967 and the Symphony of the New World in 1970. Through the Fulbright Program, he was invited to the Federal University of Bahia, Salvador, Brazil, where he taught conducting, gave master classes, led a madrigal choir and an opera ensemble. Byrd stayed in Brazil until 1976. He returned to Europe and worked with many German and other European orchestras and German and Swedish radio and television. Byrd also appeared as actor in film and TV; he played an America soldier in Rainer Werner Fassbinder's 1978 film The Marriage of Maria Braun opposite Hanna Schygulla, and a lead role in the 1984 TV film Warten auf Beethoven.

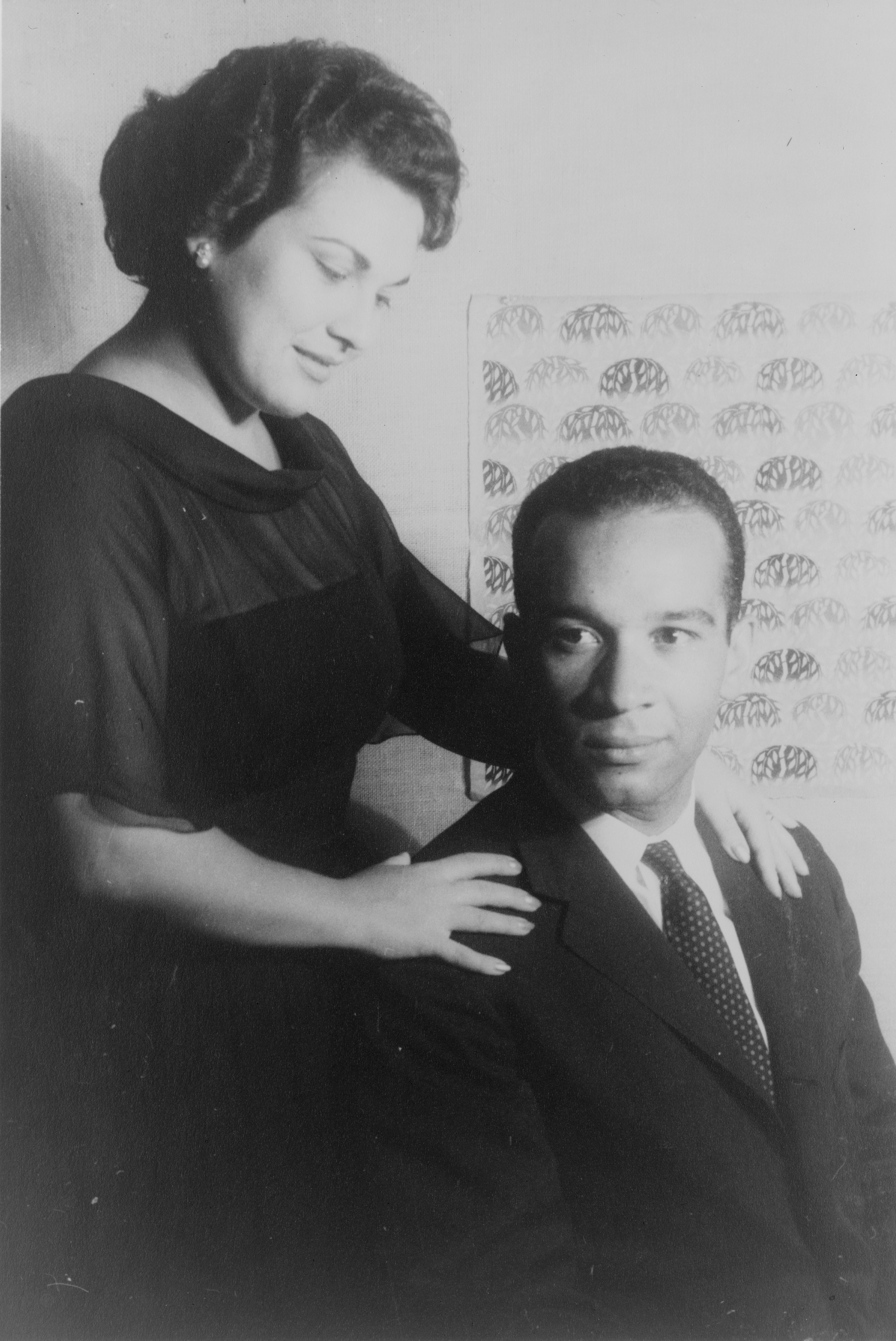
Henry Lewis and Marilyn Horne in 1961, photo by Carl Van Vechten

- Henry Lewis (1932–1996) attended the University of Southern California and at the age of 16, joined the Los Angeles Philharmonic, becoming the first black instrumentalist in a major symphony orchestra. From 1955 to 1956 he conducted the Seventh Army Symphony Orchestra and concertized throughout Europe in support of cultural diplomacy after World War II. Lewis founded the Los Angeles Chamber Orchestra. He also became the conductor and musical director of the New Jersey Symphony, transforming the group from a small community ensemble into a nationally recognized orchestra. He gained national recognition in 1961 when he was appointed assistant conductor of the Los Angeles Philharmonic under Zubin Mehta. He was the first African American to lead a major symphony orchestra. He made his Metropolitan Opera debut in 1972.
- James DePreist (1936–2013) was one of the first African-American conductors on the world stage. He was the Director Emeritus of Conducting and Orchestral Studies at the Juilliard School and Laureate Music Director of the Oregon Symphony. DePreist studied composition with Vincent Persichetti at the Philadelphia Conservatory while earning a bachelor's degree at the Wharton School of the University of Pennsylvania and a master's degree from the Annenberg School for Communication at the University of Pennsylvania. He won first prize in the Dimitri Mitropoulos International Conducting Competition. He was then chosen by Leonard Bernstein to become assistant conductor of the New York Philharmonic during the 1965–66 season.
- Paul Freeman (1936–2015) was a conductor, composer, and founder of the Chicago Sinfonietta and music director and chief conductor of the Czech National Symphony Orchestra in Prague, a position he held simultaneously with his Chicago Sinfonietta post. Freeman earned bachelor, master, and doctoral degrees from the Eastman School of Music. A Fulbright Scholarship enabled him to study for two years at the Hochshule für Musik (University for Music) in Berlin, Germany with Ewald Lindemann. He later studied conducting with Pierre Monteux at the American Symphony Orchestra. He was the music director of the Opera Theatre of Rochester for six years. He then held posts as associate conductor of the Dallas Symphony Orchestra from 1968 to 1970, Detroit Symphony Orchestra from 1970 to 1979, music director of the Victoria Symphony in Canada from 1979 to 1989 and he served as principal guest conductor of the Helsinki Philharmonic in Finland. Paul Freeman's papers are held at the Center for Black Music Research at Columbia College Chicago.
- Isaiah Jackson (1945–2024) was appointed for seven years as conductor of the Pro Arte Chamber Orchestra of Boston, of which he has been named conductor emeritus. He was the first African American to be appointed to a music directorship in the Boston area. He graduated cum laude from Harvard University in 1966. While there, he conducted Mozart's opera Così fan tutte, which helped him decide to pursue music as a career. Subsequently, he went to Stanford University and received his M.A. in music in 1969. He studied with Nadia Boulanger in Fontainebleau, France, before going to the Juilliard School in New York City, from which he graduated D.M.A. in 1973. Jackson founded the Juilliard String Ensemble and was its first conductor 1970–71. He was associate or assistant conductor with the American Symphony Orchestra (1970–71) where he worked with Leopold Stokowski; the Baltimore Symphony Orchestra (1971–73); and the Rochester Philharmonic Orchestra (1973–87). He was appointed music director of the Flint Symphony Orchestra (Flint, Michigan) in 1982, the first black music director of the Dayton Philharmonic Orchestra in 1987 and principal conductor of The Royal Ballet, Covent Garden, in 1986, and became its music director 1987–90. He was the first Black and the first American to occupy a chief position with the company.
- Calvin E. Simmons (1950–1982) was an American symphony orchestra conductor. He was one of the early African-American conductors of a major orchestra. By the age of 11, he was conducting the San Francisco Boys Chorus. After working as assistant conductor of the Los Angeles Philharmonic under Zubin Mehta, Simmons became musical director of the Oakland Symphony Orchestra at the age of 28; he led the orchestra for four years. He was the first African American to be named conductor of a major U.S. symphony orchestra and a frequent guest conductor with some of the nation's major opera companies and orchestras (such as the Philadelphia Orchestra and others). In addition, he was the music director at the Ojai Music Festival in 1978. He made his debut at the Metropolitan Opera conducting Engelbert Humperdinck's Hansel and Gretel.
- Dr Anne "Georgianne" Lundy (born 1954) was the first African-American woman to conduct the Houston Symphony Orchestra during the summer concerts of 1989 and '90 at the Miller Outdoor Theatre. Dr. Lundy received her Bachelors of Music Education from the University of Texas at Austin in 1977, Master of Music in Orchestra Conducting from the University of Houston in 1979, and Doctor of Musical Arts from the University of Houston's Moores School of Music in 2015. She founded the William Grant Still String Quartet in 1981 and the Scott Joplin Chamber Orchestra, an African-American community orchestra in 1983. The Scott Joplin Chamber Orchestra and the William Grant Still String Quartet specialize in researching and performing the music of black composers. She is the musical director of the Community Music Center of Houston.
- Leslie Dunner (born 1956) is an American conductor and composer. He went on to the University of Rochester's Eastman School of Music, where he was awarded his bachelor's degree in 1978. He later attended Queens College in New York, where he was awarded a master's degree in 1979, and the University of Cincinnati – College-Conservatory of Music, where he was awarded a PhD in 1982. His reputation as a conductor rests on his ability to communicate with the audience through a wide variety of musical styles, and through his willingness to experiment with tempo and presentation. He was conductor of the Detroit Symphony Orchestra. In 1998, Dunner took up the post of music director of the Annapolis Symphony Orchestra.
- Thomas Wilkins (born c.1956) is principal conductor of the Hollywood Bowl Orchestra. He is also artistic advisor of Education and Community Engagement and the Germeshausen Youth and Family Concerts conductor of the Boston Symphony Orchestra. Born in Norfolk, Virginia, Wilkins earned a bachelor's degree in music education from Shenandoah Conservatory and a master's degree in orchestral conducting from the New England Conservatory of Music. His past appointments have included assistant director of the Richmond Symphony Orchestra, resident director of the Detroit Symphony Orchestra and the Florida Orchestra, and music director of the Omaha Symphony, where he was appointed music director laureate in June 2021.
- Michael Morgan (1957–2021) was music director of the Oakland East Bay Symphony and the Sacramento Philharmonic Orchestra, and artistic director of Festival Opera in Walnut Creek, California. While a student at Oberlin Conservatory of Music, he spent a summer at the Oberlin College Conservatory at Tanglewood. There he was a student of Gunther Schuller and Seiji Ozawa, and it was at that time that he first worked with Leonard Bernstein. In 1980, he won first prize in the Hans Swarovsky International Conductors Competition in Vienna, Austria, and became assistant conductor of the St. Louis Symphony Orchestra, under Leonard Slatkin. His operatic debut was in 1982 at the Vienna State Opera. In 1986, Sir Georg Solti chose him to become the assistant conductor of the Chicago Symphony Orchestra.
- John McLaughlin Williams (born 1957) is the first African American conductor to win a Grammy Award for orchestral conducting. He came to conducting after a career as a violinist that saw him as a member of the Houston Symphony, concertmaster of the Virginia Symphony, and a freelance concertmaster, soloist, and violinist who performed regularly with the Boston Symphony and as assistant concertmaster of the Boston Pops Esplanade Orchestra. He has conducted many orchestras in America, Ukraine, Russia, and Bulgaria, and is particularly known for his recording activity. Williams made many premiere recordings of American symphonic repertoire for the Naxos label's American Classics Series. He has had felicitous collaborations with such notable artists as Eliesha Nelson, Elmar Oliveira, Brian McKnight, Terrence Blanchard, Hubert Laws, and The Winans. For Nelson's recording of The Complete Viola Works of Quincy Porter, Williams achieved the unique distinction of performing as conductor, violinist, pianist, and harpsichordist. That recording subsequently received a Grammy award and two Grammy nominations.
- Kwamé Ryan (born 1970, Toronto) is a Canadian conductor of Trinidadian descent. He attended Oakham School, in Rutland, England, and then studied at Cambridge. Ryan made his professional UK conducting debut at the 2004 Edinburgh International Festival. In 2007, Ryan became music director of the Orchestre National Bordeaux Aquitaine (ONBA), a post he held until 2013.
- André Raphel is an American conductor who has recently appeared as guest conductor of the Boston Symphony Orchestra, Chicago Symphony Orchestra, the Cleveland Orchestra, New York Philharmonic, and the Philadelphia Orchestra. Born in Durham, North Carolina, Raphel earned a Bachelor of Music degree from the University of Miami and a master's degree at Yale University, where he studied conducting with Otto-Werner Mueller. He continued studies at the Curtis Institute of Music earning a diploma in conducting, and at the Juilliard School of Music where he earned an advanced certificate in orchestral conducting. Past appointments have included music director of the Norwalk Youth Symphony in 1990, assistant conductor of the St. Louis Symphony Orchestra (1991–1994) working with Leonard Slatkin, assistant conductor of the Philadelphia Orchestra (1994–2000) working with Wolfgang Sawallisch, and assistant conductor of the New York Philharmonic (2000–2002) working with Kurt Masur. He is currently conductor laureate of the Wheeling Symphony Orchestra (2018).
- Jeri Lynne Johnson is the founder and music director of the Black Pearl Chamber Orchestra, the first multi-ethnic professional orchestra in Philadelphia. A graduate of Wellesley College and the University of Chicago, she is a conductor, composer and pianist. From 2001 to 2004, she was the assistant conductor of the Chamber Orchestra of Philadelphia. She has led orchestras around the world including the Colorado Symphony, Bournemouth Symphony Orchestra (UK), and the Weimar Staatskapelle (Germany). Alongside prominent woman conductors Marin Alsop and JoAnn Falletta, Johnson was heralded on the NBC Today Show as one of the nation's leading female conductors. In 2005, Johnson made history as the first African-American woman to win an international conducting prize when she was awarded the Taki Alsop Concordia Conducting Fellowship.
- Marlon Daniel is an American, Chicago-born conductor known as the foremost exponent of the music of Joseph Bologne, Chevalier de Saint-Georges, and a champion of works by composers of African descent. He conducted the Russian premiere of William Grant Still's iconic Afro-American Symphony and has become well known for his performances of works by Pulitzer Prize-winning composer George Walker, who was one of his mentors. A protégée of Jorma Panula in Finland and Jiří Bělohlávek in the Czech Republic, Daniel also received advice from Simon Rattle at the Berlin Philharmonic. Daniel is laureate of the Bucharest Symphony Orchestra International Conducting Competition and has performed in halls that include Bulgaria Concert Hall (Sofia), Carnegie Hall (New York), Queen Elizabeth Hall (London), Rudolfinum (Prague), and Severance Hall (Cleveland). He is artistic and music director of the Festival International de Musique Saint-Georges, music director and founder of Ensemble du Monde (chamber orchestra), principal guest conductor of the National Symphony Orchestra of Cuba, guest conductor of the Tatarstan National Symphony Orchestra, and associate conductor of the Florida Grand Opera.

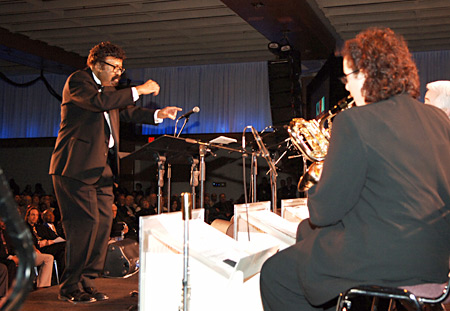
David Baker (left) leads the Smithsonian Jazz Masterworks Orchestra during the NEA Jazz Masters awards ceremony and concert in 2008.

- Jonathon Heyward (born 1992) is the first Black conductor of the Baltimore Symphony Orchestra. His appointment was announced in July 2022 when he was aged 29, becoming effective with the orchestra's 2023–2024 season. Heyward grew up in South Carolina and studied conducting at the Boston Conservatory and the Royal Academy of Music. His past appointments include assistant conductor of the Hampstead Garden Opera, assistant conductor of The Hallé beginning in 2016, and chief conductor of the Nordwestdeutsche Philharmonie beginning in 2021.

=== Jazz and popular music ===
In jazz and popular music, the leader of an ensemble may also be called a bandleader.

- David Baker (1931–2016) was an American symphonic jazz composer and bandleader at the Indiana University Jacobs School of Music in Bloomington. He has more than 65 recordings, 70 books, and 400 articles to his credit. His students include Michael Brecker, Randy Brecker, Peter Erskine, Jim Beard, Chris Botti, Jeff Hamilton, and the jazz educator Jamey Aebersold.

== See also ==
- List of principal conductors by orchestra
