= Benjamin Steinberg (conductor) =

American musician and civil rights activist (1915–1974)

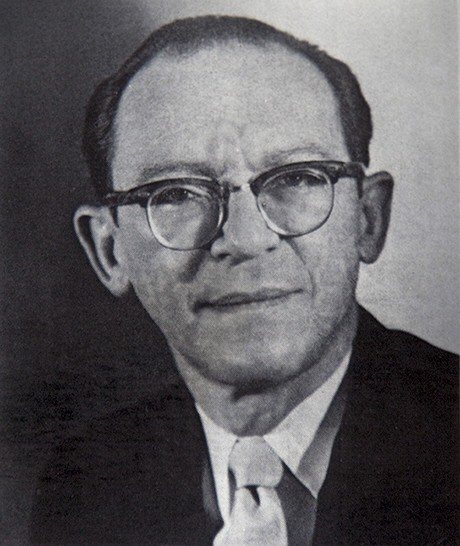
- Born: March 15, 1915; Baltimore, Maryland, US
- Died: January 29, 1974 (aged 58); New York City
- Education: Curtis Institute of Music
- Occupations: Artistic director; conductor; violinist
- Known for: Violinist, NBC Symphony Orchestra; Assistant conductor, American Ballet Theatre; Music director, Cuban National Ballet with Alicia Alonso; Founder of the Symphony of the New World
- Spouse: Pearl Sondak (m. 1939; died 1994)
- Children: Barbara Steinberg

Benjamin Steinberg (March 15, 1915 – January 29, 1974) was an American concert violinist, conductor, and civil rights activist, who is best remembered as the founding artistic director of the Symphony of the New World, the first racially integrated orchestra in the United States, its premiere concert was at New York City's Carnegie Hall on May 6, 1965.

== Early years ==
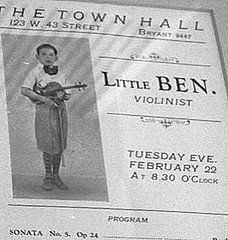
Playbill for Steinberg's recital as "Little Ben", age 11

Benjamin Steinberg was born in Baltimore, Maryland, on March 15, 1915, to Moses and Annie Steinberg. His parents were from Odessa (then part of Czarist Russia, now Ukraine) and had fled to the United States following the anti-Jewish Odessa pogrom of 1905 and the failed Russian Revolution that year. Benjamin first performed violin on the concert stage as an 11-year old in 1927.

== Career in music ==
=== Violinist ===
Steinberg was a violinist in the first violin section of the NBC Symphony Orchestra, playing on their nationwide radio broadcasts in 1943 under the baton of conductor Arturo Toscanini. He was later first violinist with the Pittsburgh Symphony conducted by Fritz Reiner, with whom he also studied conducting. Other conductors under whom Steinberg performed were Otto Klemperer and Leopold Stokowski.

=== Conductor and music director ===
Steinberg began conducting in 1941 with the National Youth Administration (NYA) Symphony, having studied under Pierre Monteux. He conducted a performance of Darker America, written in 1924 by African American composer William Grant Still. The performance was broadcast on WNYC (AM) radio in New York city on April 16, 1941. In the composer's program notes, Still wrote that the piece "is representative of the American Negro. His serious side is presented and is intended to suggest the triumph of a people over their sorrows through fervent prayer... the prayer of numbed, rather than anguished souls."

As early as 1940, Benjamin Steinberg began to work with black conductors Dean Dixon and Everett Lee to establish the first fully integrated professional symphony orchestra in the U.S. It would take another two decades to be achieved, however.

==== Symphony of the New World ====
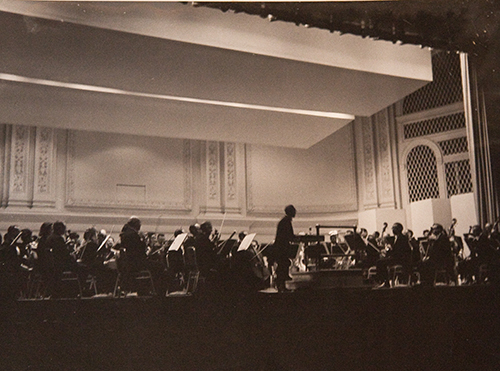
Steinberg conducting the premiere concert of the Symphony of the New World orchestra at Carnegie Hall on May 6, 1965

As the civil rights movement of the 1960s gained momentum in the US, Steinberg founded a committee to create a symphony orchestra of accomplished musicians and conductors, irrespective of race. The mission statement of the Symphony of the New World was written two months before the Civil Rights Act of 1964 was signed into law. Steinberg accepted the post of music director and obtained funding for the orchestra's first season. The debut concert of the first fully integrated orchestra in America was held at Carnegie Hall on May 6, 1965, two months before the Voting Rights Act of 1965 became law. Steinberg said of the effort, "We have a lot of talent in this city, and we have to create the opportunities to present it to the public".

Sponsors included Samuel Barber, Leonard Bernstein, Ruby Dee, Langston Hughes, William Warfield, Aaron Copland, Duke Ellington, and Zero Mostel. As the orchestra developed, Marian Anderson and Leontyne Price joined the board of directors, and James DePreist became principal guest conductor. Another prominent guest conductor was Everett Lee.

The symphony's musicians were graduates of such music schools as Juilliard (Elayne Jones), Eastman School of Music, the Manhattan School of Music, and the New England Conservatory. Its performances were broadcast on the Voice of America and Armed Forces Radio to audiences worldwide. Ebony magazine pronounced it, "for both artistic and sociological reasons, a major development in the musical history of the United States". Following an August 1969, performance by the interracial Symphony, the Asbury Park Press (NJ) was effusive in its praise of Steinberg as the orchestra's "guiding light" in the belief that "discrimination has no place in the world of the symphony orchestra". His conducting was lauded by critic Charles Hill for its "impressive virtuosity".

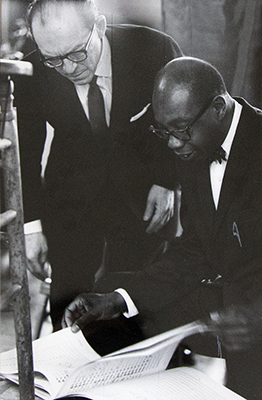
Steinberg (left) with composer George Walker in 1968

While music director of the Symphony of the New World, Steinberg collaborated with Pulitzer Prize-winning composer George Walker in the premiere of Walker's Address for Orchestra, performed by the Symphony of the New World in 1968. In 1970, Steinberg conducted the Symphony of the New World at the Lincoln Center, New York City, in a performance of I Have a Dream, a tribute to Martin Luther King Jr. Pulitzer Prize-winning music critic Donal Henahan said of the one-third black Symphony of the New World in 1970, "it regularly demonstrates the validity of its position in the largely lily-white symphonic world".

Steinberg continued as music director of the Symphony of the New World until October 1971, when he resigned after an acrimonious policy dispute with the orchestra's board. At the time of his resignation, the group had 80 musicians. The papers of the Symphony of the New World reside at the Schomburg Center for Research in Black Culture.

==== At the ballet ====
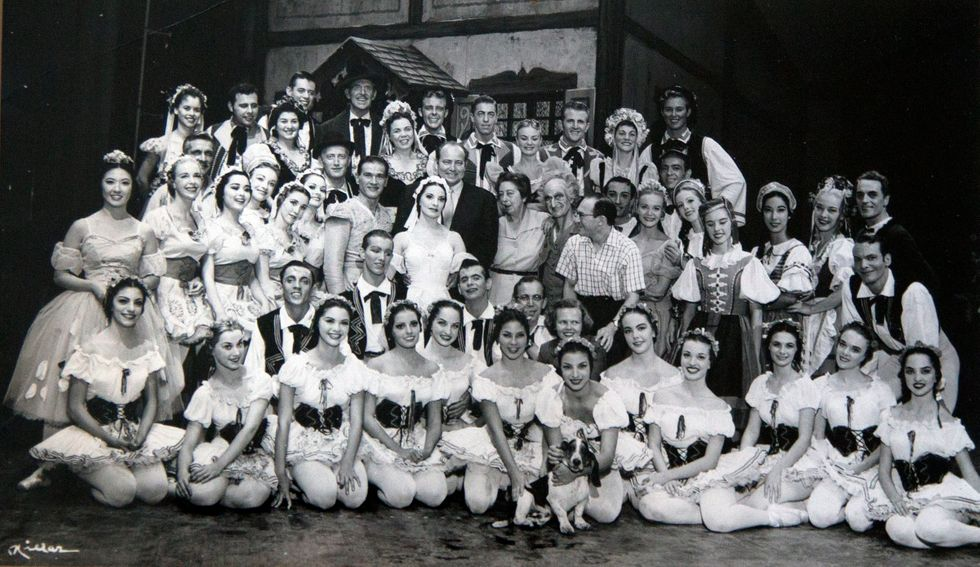
Benjamin Steinberg and Alicia Alonso, with the Cuban National Ballet

Between 1945–1947, Steinberg was the Assistant Conductor of the American Ballet Theatre. On November 26, 1947, he conducted the premiere of Theme and Variations, choreographed by George Balanchine for prima ballerina assoluta Alicia Alonso and Igor Youskevitch. Steinberg also did a South American tour with Ballet Russe de Monte-Carlo with Alonso and Youskevitch in the late 1940s, as well as with Melissa Hayden and Barbara Fallis, both of whom joined Alonso's ballet company in Cuba in 1959.

In 1959, Steinberg became the first music director and conductor of the Cuban National Ballet, the ballet company managed by Alonso, renamed when Fidel Castro came to power that year. Steinberg remained in that post until 1963, when he returned to the United States following a tour of the Soviet Union as conductor of the Cuban National Ballet Symphony Orchestra.

==== On Broadway ====
Steinberg conducted many Broadway musicals, including Leonard Bernstein's production of Peter Pan (1950), starring Jean Arthur and Boris Karloff. Others include The Golden Apple (1954), The Music Man (1957–1958), and A Funny Thing Happened on the Way to the Forum.

== Appearance before House Un-American Activities Committee ==
On June 19, 1958, Steinberg testified before the House Un-American Activities Committee, having been subpoenaed by the Committee as part of its wide-ranging probe of suspected Communist infiltration into the ranks of professional musicians. He declined to answer questions about certain musicians being investigated for Communist affiliation. Although he did not invoke the Fifth Amendment against self-incrimination in his own behalf, Steinberg said that to provide such information about others was an infringement of his right to freedom of association and freedom of speech:

Although I believe every word of the Fifth Amendment is immortal – part of the Constitution of the United States – I believe that its use by citizens has been under attack, and I believe it is my patriotic duty to resist this attack by basing my defense here on the fact that Congress has reserved to the people the right of free association and free speech, and it has specifically denied this area to Government.

In response to further questioning by Richard Arens, permanent secretary to the Committee from 1957 to 1960, Steinberg said, "It is now 11 years since the first investigation of cultural artists, and this is the fourth consecutive year in New York City. I consider this an illegal harassment of members of the entertainment industry".

He continued:

This is beyond the jurisdiction of the committee as it is defined in the House-enabling resolution. It is not pertinent to any subject within the committee's jurisdiction. The resolution creating this committee is unconstitutionally vague and, hence, invalid as the Supreme Court held in the Watkins Case [Watkins v. United States], and the questions put by the chairman invades those privileges which I consider to be my birthright, the freedom of association and the freedom of religion. Since I will not testify as to my own associations and beliefs, I would certainly not testify as to those of others... The idea of naming someone for this committee is repugnant to me. It is just an assault to me on my own personal dignity. I could not possibly turn informer and I decline to answer on all of the previous grounds I suggested.

== Personal life and death ==
Steinberg met his future wife, Pearl (born Sondak, 1918–1994), while they were both studying music at Curtis Institute. In later years, they made their home in Manhattan. Steinberg died on January 29, 1974, of pancreatic cancer and is survived by a daughter, Barbara.
