= Dorothy Rudd Moore =

American composer and music educator (born 1940)

- Born: June 4, 1940; Newcastle, Delaware (state), U.S.
- Died: March 30, 2022 (aged 81)
- Education: Howard University (1963); Bachelor of Music in Composition; American Conservatory
- Occupations: Composer; Pianist; Vocalist; Performance Artist

Dorothy Rudd Moore (June 4, 1940 – March 30, 2022) was an American composer and music educator. She was one of the co-founders of the Society of Black Composers. She is considered one of the leading women composers of color for her generation and did commissions for the National Symphony, Opera Ebony, the Buffalo Philharmonic, and solo artists. She was a member of the American Composers Alliance, BMI, New York Singing Teachers Association, and New York Women Composers. Her works were unpublished, but are available through the American Composers Alliance.

== Biography ==
Moore was born in New Castle, Delaware. She was born to a musical family, her mother encouraged her to pursue studies in music and to explore all of her interests one of them being piano lessons Moore knew she wanted to become a composer at a young age and took piano lessons as a child at the Wilmington School of Music, where she studied with Harry Andrews. She learned to play clarinet in order to join the Howard High all-male band. She was involved with music in other ways including music theory studies, the high school orchestra and choir, and the church choir.

Moore started her undergraduate studies at Howard University as a music education major but later switched to composition, as she was constantly inventing songs and melodies when she played, "I didn't even know that the word 'composer' existed... I just used to do the music" - Dorothy Rudd Moore 1978 . She studied with Dean Warner Lawson, Thomas Kerr, and Mark Fax, graduating in 1963 with a Bachelor of Music. She received the Lucy Moten Fellowship to study in France where she continued her studies with Nadia Boulanger at the American Conservatory at Fontainebleau and in Paris in 1963, Chou Wen-Chung in New York in 1965, and Lola Hayes in 1972. Throughout her career her works was commissioned by the nation's top orchestras, including the [National Symphony], [Opera Ebony], and the [Buffalo Philharmonic].

Moore worked as a private music teacher, from 1965 to 1966 taught at the Harlem School of the Arts, in 1969 at New York University, and in 1971 at the Bronx Community College. She married cellist and conductor, Kermit Moore, in 1964. In 1968, she co-founded the Society of Black Composers in New York City. In 1969, Moore and her husband were almost prevented from performing at the 1969 Damrosch Memorial Concert because "administrators fretted over having not just one but two 'Negroes' on the program."

Moore received the Lucy Moten fellowship in 1963 as her first award and followed by many other grants, and in 1968 became a co-founder of the Society of Black Composers in New York. Her works, Dirge and Deliverance, and Songs from the Dark Tower were released by Performance Records in 1981. In 1985, the world premiere of her opera, Frederick Douglass, took place in New York City by Opera Ebony.

Between 1988 and 1990, she sat on the music panel of the New York State Council of the Arts.

== Awards ==
- Awards Lucy Moten Fellowship, 1963
- American Music Center Grant, 1972
- New York State Council on the Arts Grant, 1985
- Meet the Composer grants

Dorothy Rudd Moore is celebrated for her musicianship as a singer and multi-instrumentalist.

== Works ==
=== Style ===
According to the American Composers Alliance, Moore's music is "admired for its high level of artistry and its seriousness of purpose." Her song A Little Whimsy (1982) was a response to critics who called her music too serious. Moore theorized that being a singer herself gave her insight into how to write well for voice. She did not consider herself a fast composer and preferred to have a finished product at a premiere, unlike other composers who may return to rework their music. From the Dark Tower (1970) is a song cycle written for Hilda Harris, a mezzo-soprano of critical acclaim in opera. It was later recorded and released by Performance Records. There are eight songs set to poems by black writers including Dream Variation by Langston Hughes and the namesake of the cycle, From the Dark Tower, by Countee Cullen. It is performed by voice, cello, and piano.

Moore's only opera Frederick Douglass premiered on June 28, 1985 at City College of New York with Opera Ebony. The artistic director was Benjamin Matthews with conducting by Warren George Wilson, lighting by Ron Burns, and stage direction by Ward Fleming. Frederick Douglass and his wife were portrayed by James Butler and Hilda Harris. Tim Page called it "not so much an opera as a series of musical meditations on love, death, religion, political oppression and eventual deliverance."

=== Selected works ===
Moore has composed song cycles, chamber pieces, orchestral music, and an opera. Selected works include:

- Twelve Quatrains from the Rubaiyat, song cycle, 1962
- Symphony No. 1, 1963
- Three Pieces for violin and piano, 1967
- Modes for string quartet, 1968
- Lament for Nine Instruments, 1969
- Moods for viola and cello, 1969
- Songs from the Dark Tower, song cycle, 1970
- Dirge and Deliverance for cello and piano, 1971
- Dream and Variations for piano, 1974
- Sonnets on Love, Rosebuds, and Death for soprano, violin, and piano, 1975
- In Celebration, a collage to poems by Langston Hughes, 1977
- A Little Whimsy, piano, 1982
- Frederick Douglass, opera, 1985
- Transcencion, 1986
