= Coleridge-Taylor Perkinson =

American classical composer

Composer Coleridge-Taylor Perkinson conducting.

Coleridge-Taylor Perkinson (June 14, 1932, Manhattan, New York or possibly (unconfirmed) Winston-Salem, North Carolina – March 9, 2004, Chicago) was an American composer whose interests spanned the worlds of jazz, dance, pop, film, television, and classical music. Professionally he was often known as "Coleridge Perkinson".

== Life and career ==
Perkinson was African-American and was named after the Black British composer Samuel Coleridge-Taylor (1875–1912). Perkinson's mother was active in music and the arts as a piano teacher, church organist, and director of a theater company.

Perkinson attended the High School of Music and Art in New York City and New York University. He later transferred to the Manhattan School of Music, where he studied composition with Vittorio Giannini and Charles Mills. He received bachelor's and master's degrees from the Manhattan School of Music. He also studied with Earl Kim at Princeton University. He was on the faculty of Brooklyn College (1959–1962) and studied conducting in the summers of 1960, 1962, and 1963 in the Netherlands with Franco Ferrara and Dean Dixon and also learned conducting in 1960 at the Mozarteum in Salzburg.

Perkinson co-founded the Symphony of the New World in New York in 1965 and later became its music director. He was also music director of Jerome Robbins' American Theater Lab and the Alvin Ailey American Dance Theater. Perkinson composed a ballet for Ailey titled For Bird, With Love, inspired by the music of Charlie Parker.

Perkinson wrote a great deal of classical music while additionally composing in jazz and popular music. He served briefly as pianist for drummer Max Roach’s quartet and wrote arrangements for Roach, Marvin Gaye, and Harry Belafonte. He also composed music for films such as The McMasters (1970), Together for Days (1972), A Warm December (1973), Thomasine & Bushrod (1974), The Education of Sonny Carson (1974), Amazing Grace (1974), Mean Johnny Barrows (1976), and the documentary Montgomery to Memphis (1970) about Martin Luther King Jr. In 1970, he wrote incidental music for at least one episode of the US television show Room 222.

Perkinson's music has a blend of Baroque counterpoint; American Romanticism; elements of the blues, spirituals, and black folk music; and rhythmic ingenuity.

== Compositions ==
=== Orchestral works ===
- Grass: Poem for Piano, Strings and Percussion (1973)
- Mop/Mop: A Symphonic Sketch (1998)
- Sinfonietta No. 1 for Strings (1953)
- Sinfonietta No. 2 for Strings: Generations (1996)
- Worship: A Concert Overture (2001)

=== Choral works ===
- Fredome/ Freedom for SATB Chorus and Piano (1970)
- Fredome/ Freedom for SATB Chorus, Two Pianos, Double Bass and Percussion (1970)
- Psalm Twenty-Three (2003)

=== Solo and instrumental works ===
- 60/60 for Flute, Clarinet, Trumpet and Piano (1996)
- Blue/s Forms for solo violin (1979)
- Finale for solo clarinet (unspec.)
- Lament for viola and piano (1950s)
- Lamentations Black/Folk Song Suite for solo cello (1973)
- Lil' Lite O' Mine/ Sparklin' for Flute and Piano (2000)
- Louisiana Blues Strut: A Cakewalk for violin (2002)
- Movement for String Trio (2004)
- Scherzo for solo piano (1973)
- Sonata a' la Baroque for solo flute (1994)
- Sonata for Flute & Piano (2003)
- String Quartet No. 1 "Calvary" (1956)
- Toccata for solo piano (1953)
- Walkin' All Over God's City Called Heaven for violin and cello (1996)
