= Karl Kroeger =

American composer (born 1932)

Karl Kroeger (born April 13, 1932) is an American composer and professor of music at several universities.

Kroeger was born in Louisville, Kentucky. He studied at the University of Louisville under such people as Claude Almand. After receiving a Masters of Music at Louisville, Kroeger went to study at the University of Illinois. Here his main teacher was Gordon Binkerd.

Kroeger was head of the American Music Collection at the New York Public Library from 1962 to 1964. In 1964 he received a Ford Foundation Fellowship to be Composer in Residence to the public schools of Eugene, OR< This lasted until 1967/ In 1967 Kroeger joined the faculty of Ohio University. He then began studies at the University of Wisconsin–Madison, after which he transferred to Brown University where he completed his Ph.D.

Since then Kroeger has directed the Moravian Music Foundation in Winston-Salem, North Carolina as well as being a professor at the University of Colorado at Boulder. In 1981 he received the Leverhulme Overseas Visiting Fellowship to Keeke University, where he did research in the English origins of the fuging tune.

== Sources ==
- Kroeger bio
- Brief biography of Karl Kroeger
