= Frederick Douglass (Moore opera) =

Full-length opera written by Dorothy Rudd Moore

Frederick Douglass is a full-length opera written and composed by Dorothy Rudd Moore. It is 180 minutes in duration and consists of three acts. The world premiere took place in 1985 at City College of New York's Aaron Davis Hall. The opera was commissioned by Opera Ebony.

Moore expressed that she chose to write the opera because Frederick Douglass had always interested her. She researched his life, wrote the libretto, the composition and the orchestration for the work, which took eight years to complete. The opera is based on his biography, and is less of a dramatic work than a "series of musical meditations on love, death, religion, political oppression and eventual deliverance."

The plot of the opera revolves around Douglass's second marriage, the Freedman's Savings Bank collapse and his mission to Haiti. Moore's music contains elements of nineteenth-century melodies and Haitian folk music. The opera has a mixed-race cast and includes a ballet.
