= Elayne Jones =

American percussionist (1928–2022)

Elayne Viola Jones
- Born: January 30, 1928; New York City, U.S.
- Died: December 17, 2022 (aged 94) Walnut Creek, California, U.S.
- Genre: Classical
- Occupation: Timpanist
- Instrument: Timpani
- Years active: 1949–1998
- Member of: San Francisco Symphony, San Francisco Opera, American Symphony Orchestra, Symphony of the New World, Percussive Arts Society

Elayne Viola Jones (January 30, 1928 – December 17, 2022) was an American timpanist. An African American woman, born in NYC to Barbadian immigrants, she overcame challenges. From learning piano to excelling in timpani, she graduated from Juilliard, her mentors being Saul Goodman and Morris "Moe" Goldenberg. Jones's career was marked by remarkable firsts. She became the first Black opera orchestra member in 1949, played with esteemed ensembles, and won a blind audition to join the San Francisco Symphony in 1972, becoming the first black principal in a major American orchestra. Also, Jones was the first documented African American to play with the New York Philharmonic. In 2019 she became the fourth female member of the Percussive Arts Society Hall of Fame.

Amidst the struggle for equality, she co-founded the Symphony of the New World, advocating integration. However, she faced both racism and gender bias throughout her career, including a tenure controversy.

Outside music, Jones married George Kaufman and raised three children. She died at 94 due to dementia.

== Early life ==
Elayne Viola Jones was born in New York City on January 30, 1928, the only child of immigrants Cecil and Ometa Jones from Barbados. She began learning piano at the age of six from her mother who had originally come to New York with the promise of a career as a concert pianist, but ended up as a cleaner due to her color. With this, she became her daughter's first piano teacher and motivated her with words such as "Laynie, you're going to do something respectable. You're not going to clean White people's floors!" With time, she joined the choir at St. Luke's Episcopal Church where she preferred to sing harmony and was soon exposed to the music of Duke Ellington, Count Basie, and Frank Sinatra.

== Education ==
Jones attended an all-girls junior high school in Harlem and due to her piano skills, she was accepted into Music and Art High School, an elite school that was attended by students from all the five boroughs of New York. In the musical school, all piano students were expected to also practice an orchestra instrument. According to Local 802 that hosted Jones as a member for over sixty years, she fell in love with violin in musical school but her teacher Isadore Russ told her she was too skinny, instead handing her a pair of drumsticks, based on the notion that "Negroes have rhythm". Therefore, she combined piano, timpani and singing together in high school.

In June 1945, Jones graduated from the High School of Music & Art (now the Fiorello H. LaGuardia High School of Music & Art and Performing Arts). Sponsored by Duke Ellington, she was awarded a scholarship to the Juilliard School of Music. At Juilliard she became one of the protégés of the New York Philharmonic timpanist, Saul Goodman and she also learnt xylophone from Morris "Moe" Goldenberg. In 1948, she obtained her diploma in timpani, and in 1949 she obtained her postgraduate diploma in percussion under the tutelage of Saul Goodman.

== Career ==
At the early part of her career, she was faced with racism and gender discrimination. Jones auditioned with the New York City Opera but they were reluctant to employ her due to her skin color and gender. However, her teacher, Goodman stepped in to remind them of her extraordinary performance abilities. She became the first Black person to play in an opera orchestra in 1949 and she worked with that orchestra for eleven years. She later joined the orchestra of the San Francisco Opera, and as a freelancer performed for New York Metropolitan shows such as Carousel, South Pacific, and Green Willow. In 1958 she had the opportunity to perform with the New York Philharmonic, and in 1960 she left the New York City Opera to become part of the newly created American Symphony Orchestra led by Leopold Stokowski. In 1972 she won a blind audition for the San Francisco Symphony under the supervision of Seiji Ozawa which made her the only African American to attain such a position at that time. She became popular in San Francisco, with many critics confirming her extraordinary performance capabilities. Heuwell Tircuit attested in the San Francisco Chronicle after her debut that

Right on timpani we have a drummer who can phrase like a Lieder singer. ... Her playing is so outlandish in quality, one gets the titters just thinking about it.

Arthur Bloomfield of the San Francisco Examiner reported that her work at the San Francisco Opera was so perfect and suave that he was about to fall out of his seat.

=== Teaching ===
Jones took teaching positions at several schools in New York City, including the Metropolitan Music School, Bronx Community College, and the Westchester Conservatory of Music. In her career, she presented more than 300 lone lecture demonstrations of percussion instruments in schools and colleges.

=== Activisms ===
In 1965, Jones, along with other Black musicians, and Benjamin Steinberg founded the Symphony of the New World. It is the first racially integrated orchestra in the United States that give Black musicians the opportunity to play orchestral repertoire. Also, they introduced blind auditions to eliminate racial prejudice. The San Francisco Symphony accepted the advice and in 1972 Jones blindly beat forty people to land herself a job at the company. The blind audition is a tradition that is used up till today.

== Racism and gender discrimination ==
Jones encountered racial and gender segregation during her career because the profession (classical music) at that time was mainly dominated by males. For instance, in 1950 during the tour by New York City Opera, Jones and her colleague Blanche Birdsong went to the Chicago Opera House for early preparation for the concert but the doorman refused to let her in with the expression:

We don't let Negress in the theater. Why don't you go to the South Side where you belong?

Also, at the beginning part of her career, she was forced to sleep in accommodations meant for African American while her colleagues slept in luxurious hotel.

=== Tenure controversy ===
In 1974 a seven-man committee voted against her and Ryohei Nakagawa. Jones sued the orchestra and musician's union on the bases of racial and gender discrimination. However, she was allowed to play for another year, but she was fired when the court ordered another supervised vote in August 1975 and she was also turned down. She continued to perform tenure with San Francisco Opera till 1998, but according to The New York Times her "effective firing at the symphony stayed with her"

== Personal life and death ==
Jones met George Kaufman at Adirondacks when she was playing a drum set at a jazz gig in 1952. They remained married for over ten years. At the time of their divorce in 1964, they had three children, Stephen, Harriett, and Cheryl. Jones died from the effects of dementia on December 17, 2022, at the age of 94.

== Legacy ==
According the Rick Kvistad, the principal percussionist of the San Francisco Opera Orchestra, he believed that Jones contributions was the changes she made to the music narratives by encouraging women and people of color in classical music. He remarked, "I think that her greatest contribution to percussion was that she paved the way for women and non-white players in the mostly-white world of classical music." In 2019, Jones became the fourth female member of the Percussive Arts Society Hall of Fame and in the same year her autobiography titled Little Lady with a Big Drum was published.
