= George Byrd =

American conductor

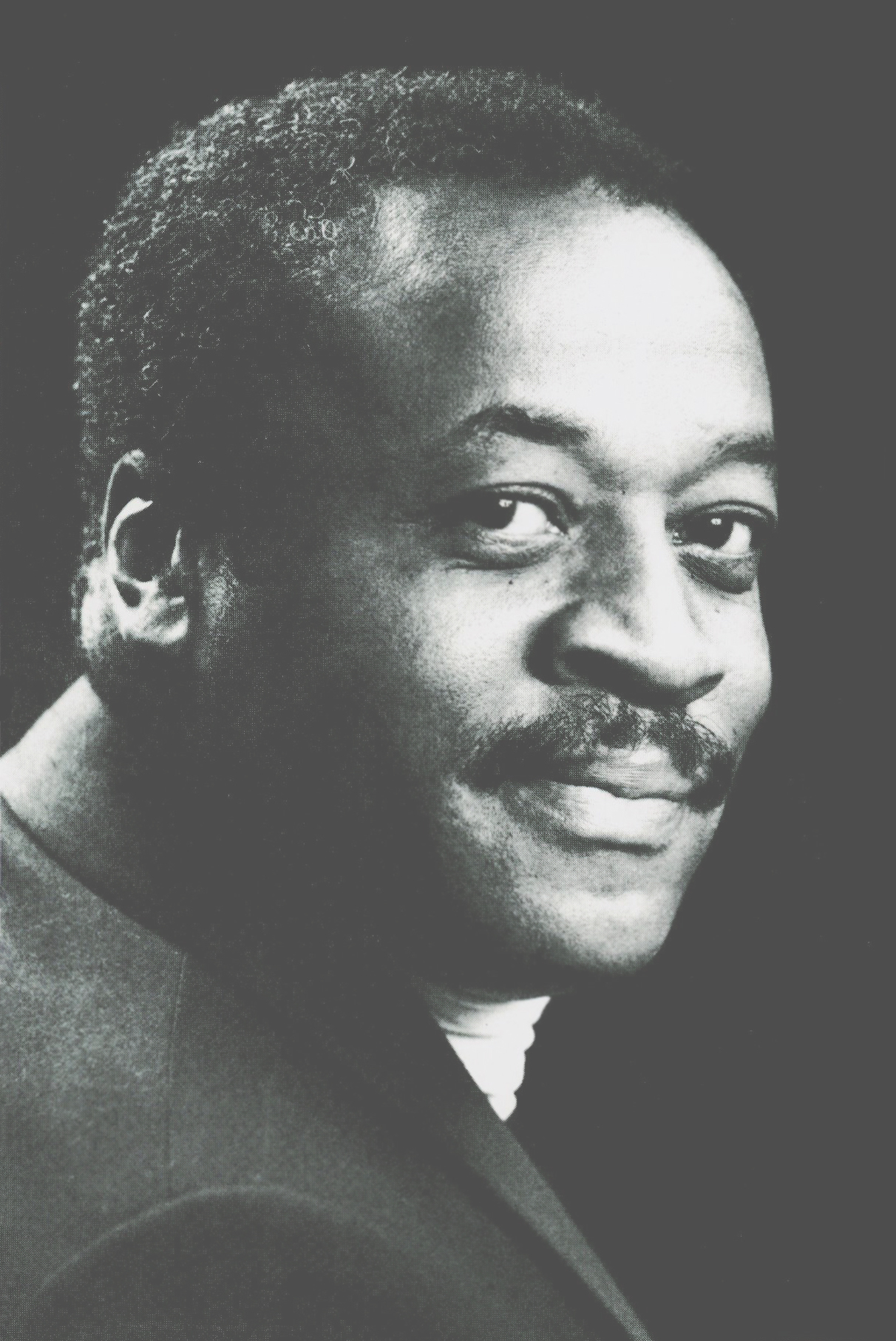
George Byrd

George Byrd (born March 22, 1926, in Anson County, North Carolina, United States; died March 12, 2010, in Munich, Germany) was an American conductor who mainly worked in Europe.

Byrd was born in Lilesville, North Carolina to Flora Byrd, an unwed mother. He was raised by his grandparents, Tom and Zilphia, and began his musical career as a singer with his twin brother. He later attended the Juilliard School on the G.I. Bill, and made his conducting debut in New York in 1948. He then attended the Conservatoire de Paris, initiating a 17-year tenure in Europe. In Lucerne, he did masterclasses with Herbert von Karajan. From 1951 onward, he conducted in Europe as a traveling guest conductor. He was the first African-American to conduct the numerous prominent orchestras, including the Berlin Philharmonic, Leipzig Gewandhaus, and the Orchestre National de France. In 1963, he was dispatched by UNESCO to Ethiopia for two years in order to assist in the foundation of a national school of music and orchestra. In 1972, he briefly returned to the US to conduct the Symphony of the New World.

He is also known for his acting performance as the American soldier called Bill in Rainer Werner Fassbinder’s 1978 film The Marriage of Maria Braun.

Byrd died at age 83 in Munich, and is buried there in the Nordfriedhof.

== See also ==
- Black conductors
