= Noel DaCosta =

Noel Da Costa
- Born: 24 December 1929; Lagos, Nigeria
- Died: 29 April 2002 (aged 72) New York City
- Genres: Classical Music, Jazz
- Occupations: Composer, violinist, conductor
- Instrument: Violin

Noel G. Da Costa (24 December 1929 – 29 April 2002) was a Nigerian-Jamaican composer, jazz violinist, and choral conductor.

== Early life and educational career ==
Noel Da Costa was born on 24 December 1929 Lagos, Nigeria to parents from Kingston, Jamaica, who were Salvation Army missionaries. After returning to Jamaica while Da Costa was young, they emigrated to New York City, living in Harlem. It was here that he started violin lessons with Barnabas Istok at the age of 11. While in High School, he was inspired by one of his teachers to work in an artistic field.

Da Costa completed his Bachelor's at Queens College in 1952 and his Master's in theory and composition at Columbia University in 1956, studying with Otto Luening and Jack Beeson. He studied with Luigi Dallapiccola in Florence, Italy, under a Fulbright Fellowship, and shortly thereafter in 1961 took positions teaching at Hampton University and the City University of New York. In 1970 he accepted a position at Rutgers University, where he taught until 2001. He died the following year at the age of 72.

== Musical career ==
Da Costa was also a co-founder of the Society of Black Composers. He was an accomplished violinist, playing his own works as well as both classical and jazz music; he played on albums by Les McCann, Roland Kirk, Bernard Purdie, Roberta Flack, McCoy Tyner, Donny Hathaway, Felix Cavaliere, Willis Jackson, Eddie Kendricks, and others. His first music set to poetry being Tambourines by Langston Hughes. He also worked with choral groups, becoming the director of the Triad Choral in 1974, and played with both Symphony of the New World and several orchestras on Broadway theatre productions.

Da Costa's works are marked by an infusion of elements of jazz, Caribbean music, and African music into the framework of Western classical music. The New York Times has described his music as "conservatively chromatic." As well as exploring Caribbean musical traditions and black American spirituals Da Costa also explored freely atonal music and serialism, as seen in his Five Verses/With Vamps (1968), Occurrence for Six (1965) and Four Preludes (1973) for trombone and piano.

Among DaCosta's students is Nkeiru Okoye.

== Personal life ==
Da Costa was married to his wife Patricia, with whom he had a son and a daughter.

== Discography ==
=== As sideman ===
- Ray Bryant, MCMLXX (Atlantic, 1970)
- Carol Douglas, Come into My Life (Midland, 1979)
- Felix Cavaliere, Felix Cavaliere (Bearsville, 1974)
- Roberta Flack, Chapter Two (Atlantic, 1970)
- Willis Jackson, Plays with Feeling (Cotillion, 1976)
- Eddie Kendricks, Vintage '78 (Arista 1978)
- Webster Lewis, On the Town (Epic, 1976)
- Les McCann, Much Les (Atlantic, 1969)
- Van McCoy, Soul Improvisations (Buddah, 1972)
- Gwen McCrae, Gwen McCrae (Atlantic, 1981)
- Bernard Purdie, Soul Is... Pretty Purdie (Flying Dutchman, 1972)
- Lou Rawls, Now Is the Time (Epic, 1982)
- Ray, Goodman & Brown, Ray, Goodman & Brown II (Polydor, 1980)
- Ray, Goodman & Brown, Stay (Polydor, 1981)
- Archie Shepp, The Cry of My People (Impulse!, 1973)
- Sister Sledge, Circle of Love (ATCO, 1975)
- Charles Tolliver, Impact (1972)
- The Tymes, Diggin' Their Roots (RCA Victor, 1977)
- McCoy Tyner, Song of the New World (Milestone, 1973)
- Sadao Watanabe, Rendezvous (Elektra, 1984)

== Works ==
=== Dramatic ===
- The Cocktail Sip (op, 1, T. Brewster), 1958
- Dreamer Behind the Garden Gate (P. Da Costa), 1991
- Wakeupworld (C. Cullen), 1991
- 3 theatre pieces for children (1971–4)
- 3 film scores (1975–86)

=== Vocal ===
==== Choral ====
- Little Lamb (Da Costa, after W. Blake: The Lamb), SATB, 1952
- Let Down the Bars O Death (E. Dickinson), SSATB, 1957
- We Are Climbing Jacob's Ladder (spiritual), arr. SAATBB, 1962
- The Last Judgement (J.W. Johnson), narrator, SSA, piano, percussion, 1964
- 2 Shaker Songs (Lord's Prayer), SATB, 1964
- 2 Prayers of Kierkegaard (S. Kierkegaard), SA, children's chorus, organ, 1966
- The Confession Stone (cant., O. Dodson), S, SSA, instrumental ensemble, piano, 1969
- Five/Seven, SSA, organ, 1969
- Counterpoint (Dodson), S, A, T, B, SSATB, organs (2) piano, 1970
- Tambourines (L. Hughes), children's chorus, piano, bass guitar, 1970
- I Have a Dream (M.L. King), SATB, orchestra or organ, 1971
- O God of Light and Love (G. Bass), 1971
- A Ceremony of Spirituals, S, chorus, soprano and tenor saxophone, orchestra, 1976
- Sermon on the Warpland (G. Brooks), narrator, Tenor, Baritone, chorus, organ, 1979
- Generations (P. Da Costa), narrator, dancers, chorus, percussion, 1985
- Second Sermon on the Warpland (Brooks), narrator, solo vv, chorus, piano, 1989

==== Solo ====
- 2 Songs (L. Hughes), Soprano, piano, 1955
- 5 Epitaphs (C. Cullen), Soprano, string quartet, 1956
- In the Landscape of Spring (Zen Rinzai poems), Mezzo soprano, instrumental ensemble, 1962, rev. 1963
- 4 Glimpses of Night (F. Marshall), Baritone, instrumental ensemble, 1964
- 4 Haiku Settings (Kobayashi Issa, Taigi, Ryota, Chine Jo), Soprano, piano, 1964
- Vocalise, S, 1972
- Beyond the Years (P.L. Dunbar), Soprano, organ, 1973
- My People (Hughes), Mezzo soprano, piano, 1974
- November Song (concert scene, Brooks), Soprano, violin, sax, piano, 1974
- Prayer of Steel (C. Sandburg), Baritone, piano, 1975
- Dream Thoughts (Hughes), Tenor, piano, 1982
- In the Quiet of …, vocalise, Soprano, viola, vibraphone, 1985
- Blues Lyrics (R. Patterson), Bass-Baritone, piano, 1989–90

=== Instrumental Ensemble ===
- Generata, organ, string orchestra, 1958
- Epigrams, instrumental ensemble, 1965
- Occurrence for Six, instrumental ensemble, 1965
- 5 Verses/With Vamps, cello, piano, 1968
- Blue Mix, solo db/electric bass, cello, double bass, percussion, 1970
- Quietly … Vamp It and Tag It, orchestra, 1971
- Time … On and On, Soprano, violin, tenor sax, tape, 1971
- Jes' Grew, violin, electric piano, 1973
- 4 Preludes, trombone, piano, 1973
- Magnolia Blue, violin, piano, 1975
- Ukom Memory Songs, organ, percussion, 1981
- Primal Rites, drum, orchestra, 1983
- Blue Memories, orchestra, 1987

=== Solo ===
- Maryton, org, 1955
- Silver Blue, flute, 1966
- 3 Short Pieces, alto flute, 1968
- Chili'-Lo, organ, 1971
- Triptich, organ, 1973
- Spiritual Set, organ, 1974

== Works cited ==
- Southern, Eileen (1982). Biographical Dictionary of Afro-American and African Musicians. Westpoint, Conn: Greenwood Press. ISBN 978-0-313213-397.
