= I Have a Dream (oratorio) =

I Have a Dream is an oratorio by James Furman written in tribute to the composer's friend, Martin Luther King Jr., to whose memory it is dedicated. The title of the work is derived from the "I Have a Dream" speech that Martin Luther King Jr. made in Washington, D.C. during the August 1963 civil rights march, and the libretto is based on statements and writings by King.

Furman described I Have a Dream as "an oratorio in symphonic form which conveys some of the basic concerns of today's world. These concerns are dramatized within a thirty-five minute musical journey focusing upon human dignity, love, hate, the tragedy of war, peace, beauty, poverty, and the hope for genuine freedom." The composer points out that "each group, representing a segment of society, speaks as an individual and in conjunction with other groups."

The work is in three parts. The musical style is varied, ranging from jungle rhythms to passages of contemporary serial and rock music. Igbo phrases are chanted in the final section of Part I and combined with English words in the coda of Part III. The climax of Part III is an elaborate interweaving of hymnss, spirituals, and patriotic songs. Despite its variety in mood and orchestration, the composer says that he aimed at an overall effect of childlike simplicity and innocence.

▶ link to April 22, 1976 performance.

== History ==
I Have a Dream was commissioned by the Greenwich Choral Society in 1970 to commemorate its 45th anniversary. The premiere of the first version took place in Greenwich, Connecticut, on April 19, 1970, performed by the Greenwich Choral Society and conducted by the composer. The second performance was also in 1970, at Lincoln Center in New York City, by the Symphony of the New World conducted by Benjamin Steinberg.

After this, the score was considerably revised. The new version had its world premiere on January 22 and 23, 1971 (the composer's birthday) with the Cincinnati Symphony Orchestra in Cincinnati, Ohio.

Neither version was ever published. After the composer's death in 1989, the 1971 score and parts were sent to Morgan State University as stipulated in his will. A small group of Furman's students have been working to locate the score so the piece can be performed once again, but efforts have been unsuccessful.

== Sections (revised Igbo version) ==
=== 1. "The River of Life" ===
The section opens with an instrumental passage with drums, suggestive of an African procession, and continues with baritone soloist and chorus, ending with the Igbo phrase "Makanjo amemeliezindu. Aa-ya." (Evil shall not overcome good. Amen.) and a slow crescendo ending in a loud yell.

=== 2. "I've Been to the Mountain Top" ===
A monologue in largo tempo in the setting of a church meeting, perhaps a revival, featuring phrases from several well-known hymns and the hymn "I Have a Dream".

=== 3. "Let Freedom Ring" ===
A multi-part section featuring gospel piano, guitar, and banjo, with the gospel chorus playing tambourines, followed by the "Poor People's March", introduced by the orchestra and featuring the rock combo. The section uses both textual and musical symbolism: the orchestra plays "America the Beautiful", the gospel chorus sings the opening lines of "America", and at one point a solo violin plays a square dance theme. The final sub-section, with the theme "Free at Last!", integrates gospel, full orchestra, and motifs from the opening Africa-themed section, as well as combining Igbo with English. The celesta accompanies the final words, "We are free at last!", and the work ends with orchestral bells and gently plucked violins.
