= Franco Gentilesca =

American theatre director

Franco Gentilesca (30 May 1943 - 6 September 2001) was an American stage director who was particularly active in staging operas.

== Life and career ==
Born in Brooklyn, Gentilesca was educated at St. John's University and Pace University. After having worked as a stage manager for the Philadelphia Lyric Opera Company, he made his professional directorial debut in 1973 with the Philadelphia Grand Opera Company; staging a production of Umberto Giordano's Andrea Chénier with Richard Tucker in the title role and Gilda Cruz-Romo as Maddalena. He directed two more PGOC productions the following year, and later staged several other productions in Philadelphia and New York City with Opera Ebony during the late 1970s and 1980s.

Gentilesca had a lengthy association with composer Gian Carlo Menotti. He first worked with Menotti during the early 1970s when he staged productions of Amahl and the Night Visitors and Help, Help, the Globolinks! for Broadway; both with conductor Christopher Keene. In 1986 he directed a production of The Consul for the Edinburgh Festival. From 1983-1993 he was resident stage director and production manager at the Connecticut Grand Opera. He also worked frequently as a director for Vincent La Selva's New York Grand Opera for over two decades. His final project was directing Georges Bizet's Carmen for Opera of the Hamptons in August 2001.
