= Society of Black Composers =

The Society of Black Composers (SBC) was an African-American composers collective, established in 1968 and dissolved in 1973.

The stated goal of the society was "to provide a permanent forum for the exposure of Black Composers, their works and their thoughts; to collect an disseminate information related to Black Composers ad their activities; and to enrich the cultural life of the community at large." The Society of Black Composers was established by a group of Black composers and performers in New York City. While active, the group hosted a number of concerts showcasing the works of Black composers.

Members of the Society have made significant contributions to American musical culture, including contemporary jazz, classical music, and television and film music. Its members included notable names, such as Jazz musicians David Baker, Marion Brown, Ornette Coleman, Herbie Hancock and Oliver Nelson.

Professional concert composers joined their rank, including Noel Da Costa, Frederick Tillis, as well as Kermit Moore, Talib Rasul Hakim, William S. Fischer, Carman Moore, Dorothy Rudd Moore, John Elwood Price, Alvin Singleton, Roger Dickerson, Primous Fountain, James Furman, Adolphus Hailstork, Wendell Logan, and Olly Wilson.

The University of Chicago holds its archive.
