= Isaiah Jackson =

Isaiah Jackson may refer to:

- Isaiah Jackson (conductor) (1945–2025), American conductor formerly for the Pro Arte Chamber Orchestra of Boston
- Isaiah Jackson (basketball) (born 2002), American basketball player
