= Garwood Whaley =

American percussionist

Garwood Whaley (born November 21, 1942) is an American percussionist and founder of Meredith Music Publications. His method books, such as Audition Etudes for Snare Drum, Timpani, Keyboard Percussion and Multiple Percussion, have become standard audition repertoire for middle and high school percussionists.

Whaley studied with timpanist Saul Goodman and percussionist Morris Goldenberg at the Juilliard School starting in 1965. After earning his Bachelor of Music, Whaley studied at The Catholic University of America, receiving his Master of Music in Percussion in 1971 and Doctor of Musical Arts in Music Education in 1977.

While in graduate school, he served as a percussionist for the United States Army Band for six years. During his time, he became dissatisfied with the small amount of formal music education materials available, and to fill this void, founded Meredith Music Publications in 1979. From 1999 to 2020, Hal Leonard controlled distribution of Meredith before it was transferred to GIA Publications.

Whaley later taught at Bishop Ireton High School and was an adjunct professor at The Catholic University of America before retiring in 2017. The auditorium at Bishop Ireton was named in his honor.

In 2011, Whaley received the Industry Award from the Midwest Clinic, and in 2021, Whaley was inducted into the Percussive Arts Society Hall of Fame.
