= Isaiah Jackson (conductor) =

American conductor (1945–2025)

- Jackson in 1973
- Born: January 22, 1945; Richmond, Virginia, U.S.
- Died: December 24, 2025 (aged 80); Oakland, California, U.S.
- Education: Harvard University; Stanford University; Juilliard School
- Occupations: Conductor; Academic teacher
- Organizations: Dayton Philharmonic Orchestra; Royal Ballet; Pro Arte Chamber Orchestra; Berklee College of Music; Harvard Extension School; Longy School of Music

Isaiah Allen Jackson III (January 22, 1945 – December 24, 2025) was an American conductor and academic teacher. He was music director of the Royal Ballet in London from 1987 to 1990. From 2001, he served for seven years as conductor of the Pro Arte Chamber Orchestra of Boston, as the first African-American to be appointed to a music directorship in the Boston area. He was a regular guest conductor for major orchestras in the United States, Europe, South Africa and Australia.

Jackson taught at Berklee College of Music, Harvard Extension School, and the Longy School of Music, among others. He received an honorary doctorate from the University of Dayton for "orchestrating racial harmony and integrating music within the lives of the young".

== Life and career ==
=== Childhood and education ===
Jackson was born on January 22, 1945, in a predominantly black neighborhood of Richmond, Virginia, the son of orthopedic surgeon Isaiah Jackson, Jr. and his wife Alma Alverta Jackson née Norris. Both of his grandfathers were physicians. Arthur Ashe was one of his childhood friends.

When Jackson was two years old, he fell on a milk bottle and severed the tendons of his wrist. His father prescribed music lessons for therapy, which he began at age 4, showing immediate dedication and aptitude. From age 14, he studied at The Putney School, a progressive, integrated and academically intense private boarding school near Brattleboro, Vermont, graduating in 1962. During his time there, he traveled with his high school class to the Soviet Union. He also took part in a picket of the local Woolworth's store in support of the lunch counter sit-ins that were happening in the South, for equality and equal access for African-Americans.

Jackson studied Russian history and literature at Harvard University, from which he graduated cum laude in 1966. While there, he had the opportunity to conduct Mozart's opera Così fan tutte, which helped him decide to pursue music as a career. Subsequently, he went to Stanford University and received his M.A. in music in 1969. He studied with Nadia Boulanger in Fontainebleau, France, before going to the Juilliard School in New York City, from which he graduated D.M.A. in 1973. He also studied at Aspen Music Festival and School and Tanglewood. At Harvard, he was a Fellow in the W. E. B. Du Bois Institute.

=== Conducting ===
Jackson founded the Juilliard String Ensemble and was its first conductor during the 1970-71 season. While still a Juilliard student, he was engaged as an assistant to Leopold Stokowski for the American Symphony Orchestra and also became music director of the New York Youth Symphony.

Jackson was associate conductor of the Baltimore Symphony Orchestra from 1971. He conducted ballet at the Spoleto Festival in Italy in 1971. He was associate conductor of the Rochester Philharmonic Orchestra from 1973 to 1987, and introduced there also classical music to preschool and elementary school children.

Jackson appeared as a guest conductor of the Los Angeles Philharmonic in 1973. The same year, he first conducted the Vienna Symphony; Leonard Bernstein suggested then that Jackson became artistic director of the Vienna Youth Music Festival. He conducted as a guest the Helsinki Philharmonic Orchestra, the Malmö Symphony Orchestra, the Gävle Symphony Orchestra, the Czech Symphony Orchestra (for the opening of the Prague Autumn), Stockholm Symphonic Wind Orchestra, the Prague Radio Symphony, the Royal Liverpool Philharmonic, the RAI National Symphony Orchestra, and the National Symphony Orchestra in Washington, D.C.. He conducted the New York Philharmonic in 1978. He also performed with the Dance Theatre of Harlem at the Royal Opera House in London.

In 1982, Jackson also became music director of the Flint Symphony Orchestra in Michigan. He performed as a guest with the Detroit Symphony Orchestra in both 1983 and 1985, and with the Cleveland Orchestra in 1983, 1984, 1986, 1987, and 1989 to 1992. He conducted the Boston Pops Orchestra in 1983, as the orchestra’s first black conductor, and the first black conductor to lead the annual "Gospel Night" program, and again in 1990 and 1992. He conducted the San Francisco Symphony in 1984, the Toronto Symphony Orchestra in 1984 and 1990, and the Orchestre de la Suisse Romande in 1985 and 1988.

In 1987, Jackson became the first black music director of the Dayton Philharmonic Orchestra, where he conducted Dayton's first performance of Mahler's Symphony No. 8 "of a Thousand". He served there until 1994.

Jackson became the principal conductor of the Royal Ballet in London in 1986, subsequently serving as its music director from 1987 to 1990, as the first black and the first American to occupy a chief position with the company. He moved with his family to London. In 1987, he conducted a concert of the BBC Proms at the Royal Albert Hall, featuring Schubert's Symphony No. 8, Rachmaninov's Rhapsody on a Theme of Paganini, Copland's Dance Symphony in its Proms premiere, and Gershwin's An American in Paris, with pianist Philip Martin and the BBC Concert Orchestra. Jackson conducted as a guest the Berlin Symphony Orchestra from 1989 to 1991, and also the Houston Symphony, the Indianapolis Symphony Orchestra, Grant Park Festival Orchestra, and the Calgary Philharmonic Orchestra.

Jackson was a particular favorite in Australia, as principal guest conductor of the Queensland Orchestra in Brisbane for three years and of the Canberra Symphony Orchestra. In a 1994 concert in Canberra, he conducted Rachmaninov's Piano Concerto No. 3 with Larry Sitsky as the soloist, Sitsky's Songs and Dances from The Golem, and Beethoven's Symphony No. 5. He returned to Canberra in 1996 to conduct Rossini's overture to Semiramide, Beethoven's Piano concerto No. 3, with Kathryn Selby as the soloist, and Dvořák's Symphony No. 8. Jackson was music director of the Youngstown Symphony Orchestra. He also conducted the Sydney Symphony, West Australian Symphony, Tasmanian Symphony, and the Adelaide Symphony. On November 5, 1997, he was a guest speaker of the National Press Club of Australia.

Jackson was musician in residence at the Memorial Church of Harvard University. In 1991, he was awarded the Signet Society Medal for achievements in the arts from the Signet Society of Harvard University. In the 1999/2000 season, he was the first person of color to conduct the Cape Philharmonic Orchestra. From 2001, he served for seven years as conductor of the Pro Arte Chamber Orchestra of Boston, as the first African-American to be appointed to a music directorship in the Boston area. He conducted them in 2004 in the world premiere of Joseph Schwantner's New Morning for the World, setting a text by Martin Luther King Jr. for narrator and chamber orchestra.

=== Recordings ===
Jackson's recordings include three CDs with the Berlin Symphony, including a live recording of their 1991 New Year’s Eve concert, string music from film scores by Bernard Herrmann, Miklós Rózsa and Franz Waxman as well as dance music by William Grant Still. He recorded harp concertos by Alberto Ginastera and William Mathias with Ann Hobson Pilot and the English Chamber Orchestra. He recorded works by Nigel Butterley with the Melbourne Symphony Orchestra. Jackson conducted the Louisville Orchestra and gospel choirs from the Louisville area under the direction of Alvin Parris III. The CD grew out of a project between Jackson and Parris which was presented in twelve U.S. cities; it also opened the Brisbane Biennial Festival of Music and was performed in the Liverpool Anglican Cathedral with the Royal Liverpool Philharmonic.

=== Teaching ===
Jackson was on the faculty at the Berklee College of Music for 15 years until 2022. He also taught at Harvard, the Longy School of Music, Juilliard, Stanford, the University of Michigan, and Youngstown State University. He was artist-in-residence at the University of Dayton, where he taught philosophy of music. He received an honorary doctorate from the university for "orchestrating racial harmony and integrating music within the lives of the young". He was visiting professor of conducting at the Hochschule der Künste.

Jackson was also president of Rhythm, Rhyme, Results, an educational music company specializing in curriculum-based educational rap and pop songs.

=== Personal life ===
While conducting in Rochester, Jackson met his wife Helen Tuntland, president of Hochstein School of Music & Dance and a consultant in the field of music education. They had three children, Benjamin, Katharine and Caroline. He acknowledged he was an Anglophile, and he conducted before members of Britain's royal family on several occasions. He spoke five languages.

Jackson suffered from sensorineural hearing loss. The inner ear damage cost him most of the hearing in his right ear in 1995 and began to affect his left ear in 2004. The hearing loss forced him to retire from conducting in 2006.

Jackson died in Oakland, California, on December 24, 2025, aged 80.
