= James Furman =

American composer and professor

James B. Furman (January 23, 1937 – September 9, 1989) was an American composer and college professor.

Born in Louisville, Kentucky, at the age of six he began piano studies with his aunt, Permelia Hansbrough. In 1953, at the age of sixteen, he won first place with a composition submitted to the Louisville Philharmonic Society's Young Artist Competition which was performed with the Louisville Symphony Orchestra, which allowed him to appear as a soloist with the Louisville Symphony.

He received his Bachelor of Music Education and Master of Music in Theory-Composition degrees from the University of Louisville. Further graduate study was pursued at Brandeis and Harvard Universities where he completed the academic requirements for the Ph.D. His teachers in composition included Irving Fine, Arthur Berger, George Perle, Harold Shapero and Claude Almand.

Among the many awards and honors which he has received are: the Omicron Delta Kappa Award as the top ranking music student of his graduating class at the University of Louisville, first place in the Brookline Library Composition Competition and two National Federation of Music Clubs awards for distinguished service to American music.

During the 1960s Furman was musical director-arranger-pianist for the Army World Touring "Rolling Along Show". His New York debut was made in Town Hall as a conductor. He was also choral director for both the BBC documentary film on the life of Charles Ives, and the Leonard Bernstein American Symphony Orchestra Ives Centennial Concert held at the Danbury State Fairgrounds in Danbury, Connecticut on July 4, 1974.

His teaching career included tenures in the public schools of Louisville (1958–59) and Mamaroneck, New York (1964–65), and at Western Connecticut State University in Danbury (1965- ). His compositions fall primarily into the categories of choral works, songs, and chamber music. Best-known of his works are the symphonic oratorio I Have a Dream (1971), Hehlehlooyuh for a cappella chorus (1976), the trio Variants (1963), the choral suite Four Little Foxes (1965), and Declaration of Independence for orchestra and narrator (1977). He was also active as a church organist and choral director.

Furman is represented in nineteen literary sources. Included among these is an in-depth study of his selected choral music in a doctoral dissertation by Effie Gardner (Michigan State University). He is widely published in a variety of mediums which include orchestral, vocal, chamber, solo, mixed media and Afro-American gospel music. He was engaged in completing a book on "The History and Performance Practice of Afro-American Gospel Music".

== Works ==
- A babe is born in Bethlehem; Puer natus, for SSATB (1978).
- Ave Maria, for SSAATTBB (1971).link Commission: Kentucky State University. Dedication: Ronnie Burnbaum. Duration: 2:30. AC: Gregg Smith Singers; Gregg Smith, conductor. GSS Recording 111 (New American choral music, v3; 1987).
- Battle scenes, for amplified harpsichord & band (1976). 1. The battle; 2. Annette; 3. The battle of New Orleans; 4 Johnson¹s march. Medfield MA: Dorn. Première: 1976/XII/19; First Congregational Church, Danbury; Western Connecticut State University Orchestra.
- Born in a manger; Christmas hymn, for SATB (1978). Première: 1979.
- Bye, bye, lully, lullay, for medium voice & SATB (1978). Première: 1979.
- Canti, for guitar & optional string orchestra. 1. Canto hondo; 2. Canto flamenco. Première: 1980.
- Cantilena, for string orchestra.
- Chanson, for trumpet or cornet & string orchestra. Première: 1980. for trumpet & piano.
- Come thou long-expected Jesus, for SATB (1971). link Fort Lauderdale: Music 70, 1980 (M70-298). 7p. Commission: Kentucky State University. Dedication: ³in loving memory of my sister, Catherine.² Duration: 1:43. Première: 1971. LP: Morgan State University Choir; Nathan Carter, conductor. Silver Crest MOR-111977 (College choirs at Christmas, 1977). Classics Record Library10-5573.
- Concerto, chamber orchestra (1964). Exists only as a piano sketch. Duration: 9:00.
- Fantasia and chorale, for string orchestra.
- For Thanksgiving; Rejoice, give thanks, and sing, for SATB & optional piano or organ (1978).
- Four Little Foxes, for soprano, alto & SATB (1963). link York: Oxford University Press, 1971 (95-309). 1. Speak gently; 2. Walk softly; 3. Go lightly; 4. Step softly. Text: Lew Sarett, Covenant with earth. Originally planned for a choral performance, with the first and third movements later designated for a solo quartet. Dedication: in memorium Permila Hansbrough. Première: 1965/XII/14; Danbury.
- Glory to God in the highest, for SATB (1978). New York: Lawson-Gould, 1979; Fort Lauderdale: Music 70, 1981 (MM70-325) . Première: 1982.
- Go tell it on the mountain, for SATB, brass ensemble, percussion, piano, organ & electric bass (1971). New York: Sam Fox, 1972 (Sam Fox choral library, Ps-193).
- Gospel anthem, for soprano, alto, SATB, brass ensemble, piano, organ & electric bass (1971). New York: Sam Fox, 1972. Commission: Carl Smith. Première: 1971. for soprano, alto, SATB & piano.
- Hehlehlooyuh; A joyful expression, for soprano & SATB (1976). video performance on YouTube Chapel Hill: Hinshaw Music, 1978 (HMC-312). Dedication: to his mother, Ollie Furman. Première: 1976; Danbury First Congregational Church. Mark ACDA89 MC-1.
- Highijin; The seven Buddhist gods of luck, for alto saxophone & piano (1980). 1. Benten; Goddess of love; 2. Ebisu; God of abnegation; 3. Daikoku; God of wealth; 4. Fukurokujin; God of longevity; 5. Jurojin; God of longevity; 6. Hoeti; God of generosity; 7. Bishamon; God of war. Commission: Philip DeLibero and Mary DeLibero. Dedication: Philip DeLibero and Mary DeLibero. Première: 1980; Philip DeLibero and Mary DeLibero. The second movement is based on Japanese folk songs, Kochae-bushi and Yoniyem jinku, and is for piano solo. The third movement is for saxophone solo.
- Hold on, for solo voice, SSATB, piano & electric organ. New York: Lawson-Gould, 1979; Fort Lauderdale: Music 70, 1981 (M70-326). Commission: Kentucky State University. Première: 1972.
- I Have a Dream (oratorio) link (April 22, 1976 performance). For baritone, SATB, orchestra, gospel piano, organ, guitar, combo organ, electric bass, guitar & electric guitar (1970; rev. 1971). 1. In the river of life; 2. I have a dream; 3. Let freedom ring. Commission: Greenwich Choral Society to commemorate its 45th anniversary. Instrumentation 2111, p. 2310; piano, organ, celeste, banjo, guitar, percussion; strings. Dedication: "To the beloved memory of my friend, Martin Luther King, Jr." Première [first version]: 1970/IV/19; Greenwich CT; Greenwich Choral Society; James Furman, conductor; [revised version]: 1971/I/22; Cincinnati; McHenry Boatwright, baritone; Len Mink, folk singer; Millie Wilson, Loiis Wilkins, Alica Clark, gospel singers; Geneva Kinnard, piano; Robert Shaffer, organ; Cal Collins, banjo; Frank Proto, combo organ; Robert Bradley, electric bass; Rob Reider, electric guitar; David Frerichs, drums; Baroque Choral Ensemble, Central State University Choir, Kentucky State College Chapel Choir; Wilberforce University Choir; Cincinnati Symphony Orchestra; Erich Kunzel, conductor. Duration: 40:00.
- I have a friend in Jesus, for voice & piano or organ (1978).
- I keep journeyin¹ on, for soprano, SATB & piano (1972).
- In the woods; Dans les bois, for voice & piano (1983). Première: 1984.
- It¹s 11:59, opera. Withdrawn.
- Jupiter shall emerge, for SSAATTBB (1978). link Fort Lauderdale: Music 70–80, 1988 (M70-461). 1. On the beach at night; 2. Jupiter shall emerge. Text: Walt Whitman. Duration: 7:40. Première: 1984. AC: Naomi Zimmerman, soprano; Gregg Smith Singers; Gregg Smith, conductor. GSS Recording 111 (New American choral music, v3; 1987).
- Just Jesus, for voice.
- Let us break bread together, for SATB (1957).
- Moments in gospel, for orchestra (1985). 1. Walk to the altar; 2. Invitation and prayer; 3. Holy dance. Première: 1985/V/5; Danbury; Ives Concert Hall; Danbury Little Symphony; Richard Brooks, conductor. Duration: 17:00.
- Deux Mouvements, for flute (1982). click for MP3 1. Roulade (1975); 2. Le cornemuseur solitaire (1982). Première: Stacey David, replacing Michael Mennone. Dedication: Don Wells.
- Music for saxophone and piano (1979). Commission: Philip DeLibero.
- Quartet, strings (1986). 1. Introduction; fugue; 2. Song; 3. Dance. Commission: Eric Lewis. Dedication: Eric Lewis and the Manhattan String Quartet. Première: 1987/VIII/9; Music Mountain, Salsbury CT; Manhattan String Quartet [Eric Lewis, Roy Lewis, violins; John Dexter, viola; Judith Glyde, cello].
- Recitative and aria, for horn & woodwind ensemble (1976). Instrumentation: 1111, bcl, alto saxophone. Première: 1977/II/17; Danbury, Ives Concert Hall; Lawrence Huntley, horn. Duration: 5:00. for horn and piano. Première: 1977.
- Rejoice, give thanks and sing, for SATB & piano or organ (1978). An alternate version or a new work with the same title and performance forces comes from 1980.
- 3 Responses for church service, for SATB & organ (1978). 1. Bless thou the gifts; 2. The Lord bless thee and keep thee; 3. Amen.
- Rise up shepherd and follow, for SATB (1977).
- Salve regina, for SSATB (1966). link Première: 1966. AC: Gregg Smith Singers; Gregg Smith, conductor. GSS Recording 111 (New American choral music, v3; 1987). Duration: 2:35
- Some glorious day, for alto, SATB & piano (1971). New York: Sam Fox, 1972. Commission: Kentucky State University. Première: 1973.
- Sonata, piano (1982). 1. Fantasy; 2. A touch of blue; 3. Sonata concert piece. Dedication: Dominique-René de Lerma. Première: Thomas DeStefano, piano.
- Sonata, violin(1977). 1. Allegro; 2. Moderato; 3. Presto.[2] Première: 1982; Eric Lewis, violin.
- Songs of juvenilia; Nursery rhyme cycle, for high voice & piano (1956, rev. 1984). 1. Tom, Tom, the piper¹s son; 2. Little boy blue; 3. Contrary Mary; 4. Humpty Dumpty. Première: 1956; Louisville; Annettte Offutte soprano; James Furman, piano. Duration: 4:50. for SATB & piano, or wind ensemble (2022, 0200) (1979) . for SATB & wind octet.
- Suite, clarinet (1976). 1. Introitus; 2. Moresca; 3. Incantation; 4. Motore musica. Dedication: Vincent Krulak. Première: 1976/III/5; Danbury, Ives Concert Hall; Vincent Krulak, clarinet. 3. Incantation, for clarinet & strings.
- The Declaration of Independence, for narrator & orchestra with optional organ & bagpipes (1976). link Première: 1977/IV/28; Danbury, Ives Concert Hall; Ella Grasso, narrator; Western Connecticut State University Orchestra; James Furman, conductor.. Duration: 18:00.
- Cantilena, for string orchestra (1976). Duration: 3:00.
- Fanfare and finale, for brass ensemble & percussion (1976). Instrumentation: 3341. Duration: 1:20.
- The grosse Fuge revisited, for 2 sopranos, alto, 2 tenors, baritone, string quartet & brass quintet (1980). Première: 1980/VII/29; Buffalo, Art Park; Manhattan String Quartet, Western Wind Vocal Ensemble, Annapolis Brass Quintet. Text: based on An die Freude and Das Lied von der Glocke, by Friedrich Schiller. Based on the string quartet by Beethoven. Commission: Eric Lewis.
- The quiet life, for soprano, alto, tenor, bass & SATB (1968).[3] Fort Lauderdale: Music 70, 1980 (M70-293). 1. Quiet by day; 2. Sound sleep by night; 3. Thus let me live. Dedication: ³to the living memory of Irving Fine.² Première: 1969.
- The three-fold birth, for boys¹ chorus, SATB & organ (1962). Commission: Joseph Muise. Première:
- There is a balm in Gilead, for alto, baritone & SATB (1984). New York: Lawson-Gould, 1988 (M70-514). Première: 1984.
- Trampin¹, for mezzo-soprano & SATB (1959).
- Triumphal fanfare, for brass quintet & percussion. Première: 1977.
- Une chanson, trumpet & piano (1979). for trumpet & string orchestra.
- Variants, for violin, piano & technician (1963). Waltham MA: 1963. Award: Brooklin Library Music Competition (1964). Première: 1963.
- Valse romantique, for high voice & piano (1976). for trumpet, double bass & string quartet.
