= Kermit Moore =

American musician

Kermit Moore (March 11, 1929 – November 11, 2013) was an American conductor, cellist, and composer.

== Early life and education ==
Of African American heritage, Moore was born in Akron, Ohio.

While still in high school, Moore studied at the Cleveland Institute of Music.

In Manhattan, Mr. Moore studied the cello with Felix Salmond at the Juilliard School while simultaneously studying for a master's degree in composition and musicology at New York University.

== Career ==
Moore was one of the founders of the Symphony of the New World, the first racially integrated orchestra in the United States. Together with his wife Dorothy Rudd Moore and others, he founded the Society of Black Composers. He was also a member and board member of the Musicians Club of New York.

== Personal life ==
Moore was married to the composer Dorothy Rudd Moore.
