= Pro Arte Chamber Orchestra of Boston =

Pro Arte Chamber Orchestra of Boston is a musician-led American orchestra based in Newton, Massachusetts. It is one of only four co-operative orchestras in the US. It had a long-time association with composer and conductor Gunther Schuller, with Isaiah Jackson as Conductor emeritus and, since 2000, Gisele Ben-Dor as Conductor emerita. Recently, Kevin Rhodes has been the orchestra's principal conductor.

Pro Arte Chamber Orchestra was founded in 1978 by a group of young freelance musicians who gathered around conductor and Harvard chaplain Larry Hill.

The orchestra received the 1994 American Society of Composers, Authors and Publishers (ASCAP) award for adventurous programming of contemporary music.

Other cooperative orchestras include the London Philharmonic Orchestra, Symphoria, the Halifax Music Co-Op, Spain's l’Orquestra Simfònica del Vallès, The Heart of England Co-operative Concert Orchestra and the Santa Fe Symphony.

== See also ==
- Artist-run initiative
- Artist cooperative
- Worker cooperative
- Conductorless orchestra (a related category but note that Pro Arte itself does have a conductor)
