= Rhythm, Rhyme, Results =

Rhythm, Rhyme, Results (RRR) is a company based out of Cambridge, Massachusetts that produces educational music in the hip-hop genre. Subjects of study have included language arts, science, math and social studies. Robbie Mitchell is the managing director of Rhythm, Rhyme, Results and has said that the goal of the company is to "create original music for educational publishing, media, and software".

Many hip hop artists have contributed to the company's projects, including Afro DZ ak, Lyrical, and MC Kabir. Contributors also include graduates from Harvard University and Berklee College of Music. School systems from several states have implemented this method into their curriculum, and a New York Times blog has noted the success that this method has had in helping students.

Rhythm, Rhyme, Results has also been featured by NPR and the Bay State Banner. Their albums have been reviewed favorably by Common Sense Media, an organization that reviews media content for kids and families.

In Fall 2009, Rhythm, Rhyme, Results received two Parents' Choice Awards, one each for its Science and Language Arts albums.
