= Morris Goldenberg =

American musician

- Born: 1911; Holyoke, Massachusetts
- Died: 1969, age 58
- Occupations: Author, percussionist, teacher
- Writing career
- Period: 1934-1969
- Genre: Percussion instruction
- Notable awards: Percussive Arts Society Hall Of Fame

Morris Goldenberg (July 28, 1911 – 1969) was an American percussionist, music teacher, and method book author. He wrote several books on orchestral snare drumming, mallet percussion, and timpani. He is a member of the Percussive Arts Society Hall of Fame.

== Career ==
Goldenberg was born July 28, 1911, in Holyoke, Massachusetts. He studied music at the Juilliard School in New York (then called the Institute of Musical Art), graduating in 1932.

His career as a percussionist began with the Chautauqua Symphony from 1934 to 1937. He also played with the Russian Opera Company in 1936 and the Russian Ballet in 1937. Goldenberg became a member of the Metropolitan Opera's WOR Orchestra in 1938 and played in that ensemble until 1952.

Goldenberg was a faculty member at the Juilliard School from 1941 to 1969. He also taught at the Manhattan School of Music from 1959 to 1969. During his time as a teacher he wrote and published several instructional books. The first, in 1950, was Modern School for Xylophone, Marimba, Vibraphone, which is often referred to as simply "the Goldenberg book". In 1955, he produced a companion volume, Modern School for Snare Drum with a Guide Book for the Artist Percussionist. He later wrote several books for timpani including Standard Concertos for Timpani: From the Piano and Violin Solo Repertory, Classic Symphonies for Timpani, Classic Overtures for Timpani, and Romantic Symphonies for Timpani. He wrote several solo works for snare drum between 1964 and 1966 that were later compiled into the book 12 Progressive Solos for Snare Drum. In 1967 he published his Concerto in A Minor for marimba and xylophone. He also wrote other works for solo snare drum and multiple percussion setups.

Goldenberg performed for television (including NBC), film, and radio, and in the recording studio in addition to his live orchestral performances. He died in 1969 and was inducted into the Percussive Arts Society Hall of Fame in 1974.

Goldenberg's students include former Chicago Symphony principal timpanist Gordon B. Peters, New York Philharmonic percussionist Morris "Arnie" Lang, drummer Allan Schwartzberg, jazz drummer Marty Morrell, drummer and author Lew Malin, jazz drummer and teacher Joseph D. Sefcik, fusion drummer Billy Cobham, prominent drum book author Garwood Whaley, Warren Benbow, studio-orchestral-world percussionist and Juilliard School faculty from 1991 to 2014, Gordon Gottlieb, and Philadelphia Orchestra principal percussionist Michael Lloyd "Mickey" Bookspan.

== Publications ==
- Modern School for Xylophone, Marimba, Vibraphone
- Modern School for Snare Drum with a Guide Book for the Artist Percussionist
- Standard Concertos for Timpani: From the Piano and Violin Solo Repertory
- Classic Symphonies for Timpani
- Romantic Symphonies for Timpani
- Classic Overtures for Timpani
- 12 Progressive Solos for Snare Drum
- Concerto in A Minor
- A Little Suite for Snare Drum
- Lucy's Riff
- Sticks and Skins
- Studies in Solo Percussion
- Marching Drum Sticks
