= Anne Lundy =

American conductor and music educator

- Born: Georgianne Lundy; October 18, 1954 (age 71); Houston, Texas
- Occupations: Conductor; Educator; Music Director

Georgianne Lundy (born October 18, 1954) is an American conductor and music educator. She founded the Scott Joplin Chamber Orchestra and the William Grant Still String Quartet, both specializing in performing chamber music written by black composers, and she was the first African-American woman to conduct the Houston Symphony.

== Education and career ==
Lundy was born in Houston, Texas. In 1977, she completed her Bachelor of Music Education from The University of Texas at Austin, where she had studied violin with Stephen Clapp (Clapp would later become the Juilliard School of Music's Dean). She completed her Master of Music in Orchestral Conducting from the University of Houston in 1979. Lundy received her Doctor of Musical Arts in Music Education from the University of Houston's Moores School of Music in 2015. She taught in Houston public schools for four years at Deady Jr. High and Milby High School.

While at the University of Houston, she formed the William Grant Still String Quartet, an African-American string quartet specializing in performing chamber music written by Black composers. Later in 1983 she formed the Scott Joplin Chamber Orchestra (SJCO) under the auspices of the Community Music Center of Houston, a community orchestra composed primarily of Black instrumentalists. The SJCO has performed throughout the greater Houston area, principally in black churches and community centers. It has also toured other cities the state of Texas. SJCO and the W. G. Still String Quartet are programs of the Community Music Center of Houston (CMCH), where Lundy is the Executive Director and conductor. In addition, Lundy assembled the Community Music Center of Houston's Orchestra shortly after joining the CMCH staff.

In the 1990s, Lundy reinstituted the student orchestra at Texas Southern University after its absence since the 1970s. That orchestra joined a small group of Historically Black Colleges and Universities (HBCUs) that had student orchestras until it was discontinued in 2013.

== Performances ==
- The Scott Joplin Chamber Orchestra accompanied pop superstar Beyonce's performance of The Star-Spangled Banner at Super Bowl XXXVIII.
- Lundy conducted the Scott Joplin Chamber Orchestra and the Houston Symphony on July 1, 1989, in celebration of the Black composer William Dawson's upcoming 90th birthday.
- The Scott Joplin Chamber Orchestra, with Lundy conducting, performed together with the Houston Symphony at Miller Outdoor Theatre in 1989 and 1990. Lundy became the first black woman to conduct the Houston Symphony. At that time the Houston Symphony had no black members, and the combination of the African-American musicians and the Houston Symphony was noteworthy.
