= Everett Lee =

American conductor and violinist (1916–2022)

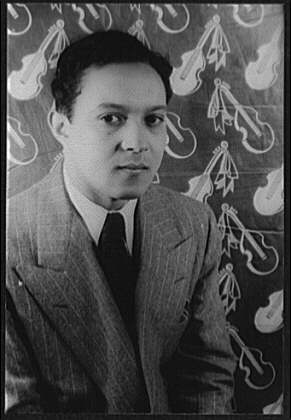
- Lee in 1948

Background information
- Born: August 31, 1916; Wheeling, West Virginia, U.S.
- Died: January 12, 2022 (aged 105) Malmö, Sweden
- Genres: Orchestral, opera, musical
- Occupations: Conductor, opera music director, musician, music scholar
- Instrument: Violin

Everett Astor Lee (August 31, 1916 – January 12, 2022) was an American symphonic conductor, opera music director, violinist and music scholar. He was the first African American to conduct a Broadway musical, the first to "conduct an established symphony orchestra below the Mason–Dixon line", and the first to conduct a performance by a major American opera company.

== Life and career ==
Lee was born in Wheeling, West Virginia, on August 31, 1916, to a middle-class family. He moved with his parents to Cleveland, Ohio, in 1927 as part of the Great Migration. While working as a hotel busboy as a teenager, Lee met the conductor Artur Rodziński, who became his mentor.

Later, Max Rudolf became Lee's life long mentor in conducting.

He studied violin at the Cleveland Institute of Music, where he received a Ranney Scholarship and later a master's degree at the Juilliard School of Music, New York.

After graduation from the Cleveland Institute of Music, Lee toured the south as a concert violinist and became well known.

His concert career was interrupted by being called into military service. Lee was selected to be an aviation cadet at Tuskegee Army Airfield, one of the air fields for the elite African American pilot squad known as the Tuskegee Airmen. He was hurt in training, and was dismissed.

In 1943, Lee was asked to join the orchestra of the Broadway musical Carmen Jones, an all-black contemporary retelling of Georges Bizet's opera Carmen. Lee played violin in the pit and performed the oboe onstage in one scene; he was one of only two African-American musicians in the orchestra. When Carmen Jones's conductor Joseph Littau fell ill, Lee "got his first break as an emergency pinch hitter". Leonard Bernstein saw a performance of Carmen Jones with Lee leading the orchestra and asked him to become the permanent conductor of his musical On the Town. When Lee joined the show in September 1945, he was celebrated for being the first African American to regularly conduct a Broadway musical.

In 1946, Lee won a Koussevitzky Music Foundation Award to conduct at Tanglewood, and played first violin in the New York City Symphony, conducted by Bernstein. In 1947, he founded an interracial orchestra, the Cosmopolitan Symphony Society, made up of "Americans of Chinese, Russian, Jewish, Negro, Italian and Slavic origin", as well as women. He served as director of Columbia University's opera department in the early 1950s and traveled to Europe on a Fulbright scholarship. In 1953, Lee served as a guest conductor of the Louisville Orchestra, becoming the first African American to conduct a white symphony orchestra in the American South. In 1955, he conducted an acclaimed New York City Opera production of La traviata, becoming "the first Negro to conduct professional grand opera in the U.S." In 1950 and 1954, he conducted the Naumburg Orchestral Concerts in the Naumburg Bandshell, Central Park, in the summer series.

Lee, c. 1969

Lee was met with undisguised racism throughout his career. Oscar Hammerstein II declined to hire Lee to conduct touring productions of his shows, explaining that Southern theaters would refuse to book them. Concert manager Arthur Judson told Lee, "I don't believe in Negro symphony conductors." Deciding that he would find better opportunities outside of America, Lee moved to Munich, Germany, with his family in 1954 where Lee was head of the Opernbühne. In 1962, he was appointed chief conductor of the Norrköping Symphony Orchestra in Sweden, a position he held for a decade.

Lee was a conductor at Carnegie Hall in New York City with the Symphony of the New World and the American Symphony Orchestra from 1969 to 1983. At one of his performances in 1983, he conducted Opera Ebony and the American Symphony Orchestra. The program included Lee conducting Joseph Bologne, Chevalier de Saint-Georges' Ernestine opera excerpts, William Grant Still's Troubled Island opera duet, Spiritual selections and other vocal and orchestral works. Featured soloists included, Benjamin Matthews, baritone (co-founder of Opera Ebony), Joy Simpson, Alpha Floyd, Joyce Mathis, sopranos, and Michael Austin, tenor. Lee was a speaker on the program for the "Tribute to Sylvia Olden Lee, Master Musician and Teacher Concert" at Carnegie Hall on June 29, 2017. In 1975, he debuted as music director of the Symphony of the New World for a series of concerts in Washington, D.C. In 1976, he conducted the New York Philharmonic for the first time; the concert was in honor of Martin Luther King Jr.'s birthday and included a work by African-American composer David Baker. In 1979, he became music director of the Bogotá Philharmonic Orchestra in Colombia. Lee conducted nearly 1,000 orchestral pieces, about 100 choral and operatic works and two Broadway works in the United States, Europe and South America.

Lee was appointed honorary Doctor of Music by West Virginia University in 2018.

=== Personal life and death ===
Lee married the accompanist and vocal coach Sylvia Olden (1917–2004) in 1944. They had two children, the late Everett Lee III and Dr. Eve Lee. They divorced, and Lee later married opera singer Christin Andersson in 1979. They had one son, opera singer Erik Lee. At the time of his death, Lee lived in Malmö, Sweden, where he died on January 12, 2022, at the age of 105.
