= Claude Almand =

American music professor (1915–1957)

Claude Marion Almand (May 31, 1915 – September 12, 1957) was a musician and professor of music at several American universities. Almand was a professor at the University of Louisville from 1948 to 1953. In 1953, he was appointed the dean of Stetson University's School of Music.

== Early life and education ==
Almand was born on May 31, 1915, in Winnsboro, Louisiana, to Claude F. Almand and Pearl Harrison. He was the youngest of four boys born to the couple. His father was a Baptist minister. He attended the Sherwood School of Music in Chicago from 1934 to 1935. He received a Master of Music degree from Louisiana State University in 1938. He received his doctoral degree (PhD) from the Eastman School of Music, University of Rochester in 1940.

== Personal life ==
On July 27, 1950, he married Lenoir Patton.

== Career ==
Almand also served for a time on the faculty of the Southern Baptist Theological Seminary in their music division. Almand received two commissions from the Louisville Orchestra. The first was for the John Gilbert Overture, the second for the Piano Concerto. The concerto was first performed with Benjamin Owen as soloist.

== Selected works ==
- Pondy Woods (1938)
- The Legend of the Last Isle (1939)
- Symphony: The Waste Land (1940)
- Fanfare of Praise (SATB)
- Psalm 100 (SATB)
- Dedication Anthem (SATB)
- Toccata for Piano and small Orchestra
- Five Piano Sonatas
- John Gilbert: A Steamboat Overture for Orchestra
- Piano Concerto
- Roustabout: overture for Band
- The Resurrection Story: Cantata for Soloists, Chorus and Organ

== Death and legacy ==
Almand died on September 12, 1957. He died in an automobile accident on his way home from a conference.

Lenoir Patton Almand, who was also an accomplished musician and Stetson University faculty member, made gifts during her lifetime and an estate gift to endow the Almand Chair of Composition in Stetson's School of Music in Claude Almand's honor. Some compositions are also in the Music Library of the University of Louisville.
