= Symphony of the New World =

American symphony orchestra (1965–1978)

- Orchestra
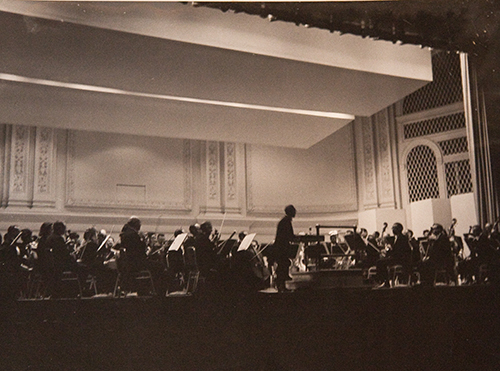
- Benjamin Steinberg conducting the premiere concert of the orchestra at Carnegie Hall on May 6, 1965
- Founded: 1965
- Disbanded: 1978
- Location: New York City
- Principal conductor: Benjamin Steinberg

The Symphony of the New World was a symphony orchestra based in New York City. It was the first racially integrated orchestra in the United States. The symphony gave its debut concert on May 6, 1965, at Carnegie Hall, conducted by Benjamin Steinberg, who said of the orchestra: "We have a lot of talent in this city, and we have to create the opportunities to present it to the public".

The symphony's musicians were graduates of music schools such as Juilliard, Eastman School of Music, the Manhattan School of Music, and the New England Conservatory. Its performances were broadcast on the Voice of America and Armed Forces Radio to audiences worldwide. Ebony magazine pronounced it, "for both artistic and sociological reasons, a major development in the musical history of the United States".

Steinberg continued as music director and conductor until 12 December 1971, when a dispute between him and some of the orchestra's members resulted in his resignation backstage shortly before the start in order for the concert to continue under his baton. Financial difficulties, caused by the general economic situation and by a delay in receiving $100,000 of scheduled grants led to the rest of the 1971–72 concert season being cancelled. Everett Lee was the chief conductor from 1971 until the symphony stopped performing in 1978.

The symphony gave its last concert on Sunday, April 9, 1978.

== Founding ==
In 1940, Steinberg had begun to work with conductors Dean Dixon and Everett Lee to establish the first fully integrated professional symphony orchestra in the U.S. The dream never materialized because of insufficient funds.

When the Civil Rights Act of 1964 was passed on July 2, flutist Harold Jones remembered: "There was a nucleus of people: Elayne Jones, Harry Smyles, Joe Wilder, Wilmer Wise, Kermit Moore, Lucille Dixon. We all got together and had these meetings. 'Are we interested?' Everyone jumped to the idea. 'Yes. Let's do this. We're going to do it -- have an integrated orchestra.' The standards of the musicians were very high. We had to deal with personnel. Designating the spots to play was a big-time meeting. Benny organized who was going to be first chair, who was going to be second. Then he asked, 'How many concerts would you like to do?' We discussed it, and he took it to heart. Benny went out and got the money. He asked Zero Mostel, who was doing A Funny Thing Happened on the Way to the Forum on Broadway at the time."

The series of meetings produced the mission statement for the Symphony of the New World, an orchestral expression of the Civil Rights Movement. The name was chosen to reflect the conviction that segregated ensembles were "not of today's world". The mission statement was written by Benjamin Steinberg as music director and 11 founders: Alfred Brown, Selwart R. Clarke, Richard Davis, Elayne Jones, Harold M. Jones, Frederick L. King, Kermit D. Moore, Coleridge-Taylor Perkinson, Ross C. Shub, Harry M. Smyles, and Joseph B. Wilder. The goals of The Symphony of the New World were:

1. To create job opportunities for the many talented non-white classical instrumentalists who have so far not been accepted in this nation's symphony orchestras.
2. To present qualified conductors and, as a basic responsibility, qualified non-white conductors under professional standards.
3. To give concerts of the highest artistic and professional standards in communities of low-income families, such as Bedford-Stuyvesant and Harlem areas of New York City. However, the orchestra will periodically appear in Carnegie Hall and Lincoln Center, and in many of the city's schools and colleges.
4. To so establish the Symphony of the New World as to make it our nation's cultural beacon in the eyes of the peoples of Asia, Africa, and Latin America.

The orchestra debuted with 36 black and 52 white musicians. Beyond the mission statement, the symphony wanted to integrate the symphonic stage with female musicians, as well; in 1975 the then director said it was 40% black, with most of those being black women. Among the orchestra's original sponsors were Samuel Barber, Leonard Bernstein, Aaron Copland, Paul Creston, Ruby Dee, Langston Hughes, Hershy Kay, Gian Carlo Menotti, Zero Mostel, Ruggiero Ricci, and William Warfield.

A gift of $1000 from the Equitable Life Assurance Society, a grant from the fund of Martha Baird Rockefeller, and many small donations from Black supporters provided the initial backing for the Symphony of the New World. Zero Mostel also contributed.

== Performances ==
On 6 May 1965, two months after the "Bloody Sunday" civil rights march from Selma to Montgomery and exactly three months before the Voting Rights Act of 1965 took effect, the Symphony of the New World performed its debut concert at Carnegie Hall. Soprano Evelyn Mandac sang Francesco Cilea's aria "Iu son l'umile ancella" from his opera, Adriana Lecouvreur and "Depuis le jour" from Louise by Gustave Charpentier. Allan Booth was the piano soloist, and Joe Wilder played the trumpet solo for Stravinsky's Petrouchka. Trumpeter Wilmer Wise recalled: "Some people were crying because it was something we had dreamt about and it had finally come to fruition. I never felt in my life the way I did when I sat on the stage with Benjamin Steinberg in a fully integrated orchestra – because, usually, I was the one integrating it."

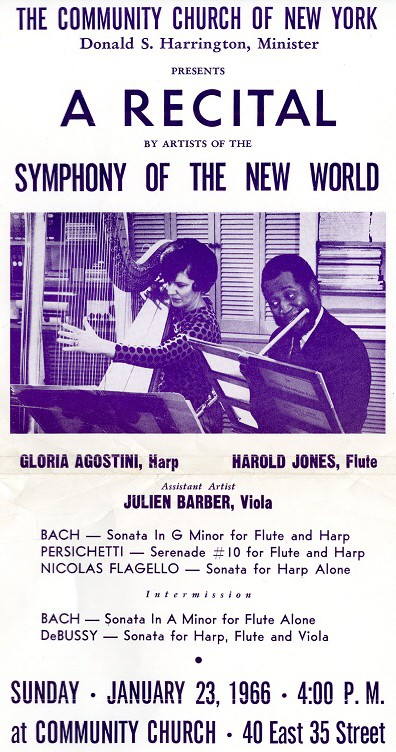
Gloria Agostini and Harold Jones, artists of the Symphony of the New World, rehearsing for a concert at the Community Church, 40 East 35th Street in New York City, 23 January 1966

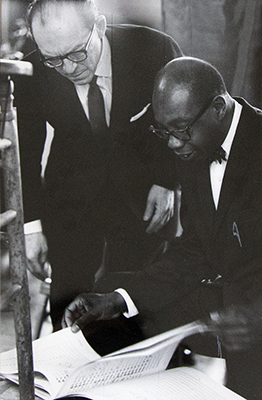
George Walker going over his Address for Orchestra with Benjamin Steinberg, director of the Symphony of the New World

The program notes stated:

At this period in our history, when the problem of racial integration has become crucial to our nation's internal well-being as well as to its position in the world, the debut concert tonight of the Symphony of the New World is a historic event in the music life of our time. Under the direction of the noted conductor and music director Benjamin Steinberg, the Symphony consists of 36 Negro and 52 white musicians. Never before in the musical history of the nation has such a completely integrated symphonic ensemble been created.

Following its Carnegie Hall debut concert, the Symphony of the New World will repeat its program in Harlem on Sunday afternoon, May 9, at the High School of Music and Art, 135th Street and Convent Avenue. This concert will be the first in the Symphony's long-range plan of performing in communities of low-income families and in reaching a public outside the orbit of the traditional concert world.

The idea of the symphony has long been a hope of conductor Steinberg, who has over the past 25 years worked closely with the American Negro conductors, Dean Dixon and Everett Lee, as well as with innumerable nonwhite instrumentalists. In May 1964, Mr. Steinberg and a group of 13 prominent musicians organized a founding committee to create a symphony in which the principle of racial integration would find complete expression. It has taken almost one year for this artistic project to reach fruition. From its inception, the symphony has maintained a strict policy of accepting only thoroughly trained, top-flight performers.

In creating job opportunities for the many talented nonwhite instrumentalists who hitherto have not been widely accepted in this nation's symphony orchestras, the Symphony of the New World aims to serve as an example of the principle of racial-equality-in-action to musical groups throughout the country. In the belief that so many of our symphony orchestras are not of today's world, it has called itself the Symphony of the New World. The Symphony has been granted tax exempt status by the Department of Internal Revenue so that tax deductible contributions can be made to support what may well be the most important culture venture of our time.

On October 11, 1965, Leonard Bernstein wrote to Donald L. Engle, Director of The Martha Baird Rockefeller Fund for Music.

Dear Mr. Engle:

It is a pleasure for me to be able to recommend The Symphony of the New World for a sizable grant. I have not actually heard the orchestra perform. But I have heard and known Mr. Steinberg, who conducted one of my theatre works 15 years ago (1950 Broadway production of Peter Pan). He is extremely able and gifted; and I am sure that under his guidance the orchestra will flourish. Most important of all, of course, is the sociological impetus behind the project – a truly integrated symphony orchestra. The success of this project will certainly stimulate more of the same, and may provide us with our first big step out of the unfair and illogical situation in which we now find ourselves with the Negro musician.

Respectfully yours,

Leonard Bernstein

The symphony received a grant of $5,000 "to be matched two for one", and was able to raise the required $10,000 with help from American Airlines (which gave $1,000) and the National Endowment for the Arts (which gave $25,000 in 1967); the New York State Council on the Arts undertook to subsidize concerts in low-income New York City neighborhoods. During its lifetime, the orchestra was also supported by the Ford Foundation, the Exxon Foundation and the National Endowment for the Arts.

Many successful concerts and collaborations followed. James DePreist was the symphony's principal guest conductor. John Hammond was president of the board of directors, which included Marian Anderson, Leontyne Price, and Zero Mostel. Anderson and Mostel were also patron artists, along with the Modern Jazz Quartet, George Shirley and William Warfield.

There were also breakthroughs. Marilyn Dubow, a soloist with the symphony, won a seat in the New York Philharmonic as the first female violinist. Elayne Jones, one of the founders, joined the San Francisco Symphony as its first black woman timpanist. Thinking back on her days with the Symphony of the New World, Jones remembers, "The legitimacy of our organization was not acceptable until we had people who were supporting us. We had to have donations to begin to establish as a viable organization and to get union support! We had to begin getting players for this orchestra. All I remember is how complicated it was and what we went through. We had to also deal with those who said it couldn’t be done."

In 1968, the Symphony of the New World performed the premiere of Address for Orchestra, composed by concert pianist and Smith College professor George Walker, at the High School of Music & Art in Harlem. They performed it again the following day at Lincoln Center. In a special concert for Black History Month in 1974, the symphony premiered Wade Marcus' A Moorish Sonata and also, with Ruggiero Ricci, the 1864 Concerto for Violin and Orchestra by the Cuban composer Joseph White that had been rediscovered by Paul Glass, a professor at Brooklyn College.

In a 1969 concert, Mostel occasioned hilarity, including reportedly among the orchestra players, in his conducting debut with Rossini's overture to Semiramide.

== End of the orchestra ==
By 1971, the orchestra and its supporters had great hopes for the season, but the 1971 season was never completed. One of the things Steinberg used to do was ask principal players to sit second chair, so an up-and-coming musician could have a chance to gain experience. Everyone was happy to do it, until one person changed his mind. Two factions emerged. Eventually Steinberg had to resign backstage at Philharmonic Hall just before a concert on 12 December 1971, so the concert could go on. He conducted the concert nonetheless. The dispute went to arbitration, and control of the Symphony of the New World was taken away from Steinberg on 12 June 1972. "Egos", said Joe Wilder. "It was all about egos. I had been very proud to be a member of the orchestra, but I was annoyed at some of the racial overtones to Ben Steinberg’s resigning." Jazz writer Ed Berger's biography of Joe Wilder also quotes founding member and violist Alfred Brown: "There were some people – not the majority – who had a problem with him. Some of them felt the conductor should be black. I was not one of them. I liked him very much. He was very idealistic."

On 1 February 1972, Benjamin Steinberg wrote his last fundraising letter. It said: "It is with sincere regret that we must advise that, due to an internal controversy as well as unforeseen financial difficulties arising from the current general economic situation, the Symphony of the New World is canceling the rest of the 1971–1972 concert season. Not only have we sustained the economic pinch facing all non-profit cultural institutions this season, but because of the difficulties, some $100,000 in scheduled grants could not be received in time to permit the completion of this concert season." Later that year, after an arbitration process, the symphony regrouped under a new board of directors and new music director Everett Lee, who had been one of the African American guest conductors brought in by Steinberg.

Over the following few years, the orchestra persevered with an ambitious series of concerts, making its debut in Washington, D.C., in October 1975 and returning to Carnegie Hall as its home base the same month. In March 1977, a New York Times reviewer praised the performers' "technical security", judging the twelfth season the orchestra's best. However, funding remained a perennial problem. In February 1975, the orchestra was forced to cancel a scheduled concert for financial reasons. Conductor George Byrd, who had led the symphony in an October 29, 1972, concert, remarked, "It seems to me macabre that the Black Panthers find it easier to raise money than the Symphony of the New World." The 1977–78 season seems to have been the symphony's swan song. The New York Times Arts and Leisure section lists a Symphony of the New World concert for Sunday, April 9, 1978, and no dates beyond that. The groundbreaking orchestra seems to have dissolved without fanfare or even an announcement.

Despite its inglorious end, the musicians who were part of the Symphony of the New World felt proud to be a part of the project. "It built hope where there was very little", flutist Harold Jones said. "It showed that, as black people, we had paid our dues and we could do it as well as anyone else. It was such a moment in life that I’m overwhelmed with it. I just wish it could have lasted. The inspiration that this could be done [remains] in all of us."

A commemorative exhibit on the 50th anniversary of the founding of the Symphony of the New World was held at the New York Public Library in 2014. The orchestra's papers reside at the Schomburg Center for Research in Black Culture.

== "Concert Black" by Terrance McKnight ==
The Symphony of the New World will be a focus of WQXR host's Terrance McKnight's upcoming book, Concert Black. In an article for National Sawdust magazine, he wrote: "In many American cities you’ll find two communities of classical musicians and organizations: one Black and one white. A focal point in Concert Black is a moment when those two communities came together in New York in the 1960s to form the first professionally integrated orchestra in the country. The Symphony of the New World played concerts from 1965–1978, and at one point more than 80% of its subscribers were people of color.

"The Symphony of the New World was successful in building new audiences for and for accomplishing multiculturalism in the concert hall. Duke Ellington and the Modern Jazz Quartet performed with this orchestra. Marian Anderson and Martina Arroyo appeared with the orchestra. There were Black conductors and composers regularly represented and more than a few Asian musicians were in the ranks, which was rare for the times. The Symphony of the New World was where our cultural institutions say they want to be."
