= Dean Dixon =

American conductor

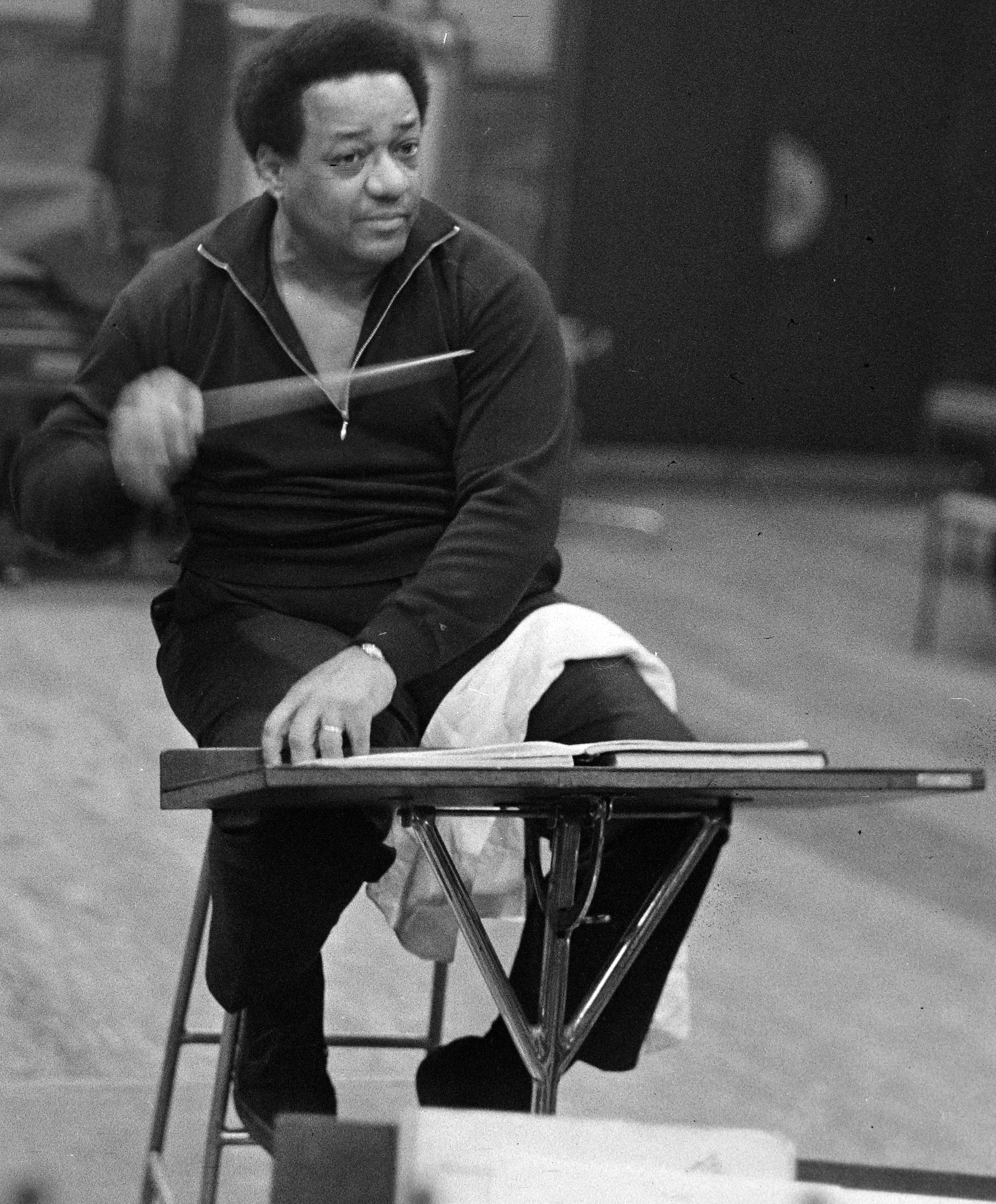
Dixon conducting in 1962

Charles Dean Dixon (January 10, 1915 – November 3, 1976) was an American conductor.

== Career ==
Dean Dixon (photo with 1961 dedication)

Dixon was born in the upper-Manhattan neighborhood of Harlem in New York City to parents originally from the Caribbean. He studied conducting with Albert Stoessel at the Juilliard School and Columbia University. When early pursuits of conducting engagements were stifled because of racial bias (he was African American), he formed his own orchestra and choral society in 1931. In 1941, he guest-conducted the NBC Symphony Orchestra, and the New York Philharmonic during its summer season. He later guest-conducted the Philadelphia Orchestra and Boston Symphony Orchestra. In 1947 he conducted a Naumburg Orchestral Concert, in the Naumburg Bandshell, Central Park for their summer series. In 1948 he won the Ditson Conductor's Award.

Johannes Brahms: Tragic Ouverture, excerpt from a 1968 recording with the Frankfurt Radio Symphony

In 1949, he left the United States for the Israel Philharmonic Orchestra, which he directed during its 1950 and 1951 seasons. He was principal conductor of the Gothenburg Symphony in Sweden 1953–60, the Sydney Symphony Orchestra in Australia 1964–67, and the hr-Sinfonieorchester in Frankfurt 1961–74. During his time in Europe, Dixon guest-conducted with the WDR Sinfonieorchester in Cologne and the Symphonieorchester des Bayerischen Rundfunks in Munich. He also made several recordings with the Prague Symphony Orchestra in 1968–73 for Bärenreiter, including works of Beethoven, Brahms, Haydn, Mendelssohn, Mozart, Schumann, Wagner, and Weber. For Westminster Records in the 1950s, his recordings included symphonies and incidental music for Rosamunde by Schubert, symphonic poems of Liszt (in London with the Royal Philharmonic), and symphonies of Schumann (in Vienna with the Volksoper Orchester). Dixon also recorded several American works for the American Recording Society in Vienna. Some of his WDR broadcast recordings were issued on Bertelsmann and other labels. Dean Dixon introduced the works of many American composers, such as William Grant Still, to European audiences.

During the 1968 Olympic Games, Dixon conducted the Mexican National Symphony Orchestra.

Dixon returned to the United States in 1970 for guest-conducting engagements with the New York Philharmonic, Chicago Symphony Orchestra, Detroit Symphony, Milwaukee Symphony, Pittsburgh Symphony, St. Louis Symphony, and San Francisco Symphony in the 1970s. He also served as the conductor of the Brooklyn Philharmonic, where he gained fame for his children's concerts. He also conducted most of the major symphony orchestras in Africa, Israel, and South America. Dixon's last appearance in the US was conducting the Philadelphia Orchestra in April 1975.

Dixon was honoured by the American Society of Composers, Authors and Publishers (ASCAP) with the Award of Merit for encouraging the participation of American youth in music. In 1948, Dixon was awarded the Alice M. Ditson award for distinguished service to American music.

Dixon was to tour Australia in the autumn of 1975 but had to cancel most of the tour due to heart problems. He returned to Europe and died in Zug, Switzerland, on November 4, 1976, after suffering a stroke. He was 61 years old.

He once defined the three phases of his career by the descriptions he was given: firstly, he was called "the black American conductor Dean Dixon"; when he started to be offered engagements he was "the American conductor Dean Dixon"; and after he had become fully accepted he was called simply "the conductor Dean Dixon".

== Personal life ==
Dixon was married three times. His first was to Vivian Rivkin, with whom he had a daughter, Diane, in 1948. In the January 28, 1954 edition of Jet, it was announced that he and Rivkin had divorced and he was to marry Finnish Countess and playwright Mary Mandelin. The couple met in 1951 via an introduction when Dixon was directing a concert for the Red Cross in Finland. Dixon and Mandelin were married on January 28, 1954. On July 28 that year, their daughter Nina was born. This marriage also ended in divorce.

In the late 1960s Dixon unsuccessfully tried twice to make contact and re-establish a relationship with Diane, the daughter from his first marriage.

His final marriage was to Ritha Blume in 1973.

== See also ==
- Black conductors
