= Opera Ebony =

African American opera company in New York City

Opera Ebony is an African-American opera company that has performed in a wide variety of programs and venues, ranging from Mozart in Harlem to African-American Heritage concerts in Iceland to Gershwin in Moscow to Duke Ellington in the Caribbean.

African-American opera stars that were trained by Opera Ebony or have performed with the company include sopranos Marvis Martin, Jessye Norman and Kathleen Battle; baritone Lawrence Craig; and conductors Leslie Dunner, Everett Lee and Tania León.

== History ==
Opera Ebony is the longest continuously operated Black Opera Company in the world. It was founded in 1973 by Benjamin Matthews, along side Wayne Sanders.
