= Accord Symphony Orchestra =

American symphony orchestra

- Orchestra
- Former name: DC Strings Orchestra
- Founded: 2017; 9 years ago
- Location: Washington, D.C., U.S.
- Concert hall: John F. Kennedy Center for the Performing Arts
- Principal conductor: Julien Benichou
- Website: accordsymphony.org

The Accord Symphony Orchestra is an American symphony orchestra based in Washington, D.C., United States.

Founded in 2017 by Andrew M. Lee (originally called DC Strings Orchestra), it is a symphony orchestra based in Washington, D.C.. One of the Accord Symphony Orchestra's venues is the John F. Kennedy Center for the Performing Arts, where it usually gives various concerts. The orchestra regularly collaborates with the Washington Conservatory of Music.

Julien Benichou has been serving as the orchestra's principal conductor since 2023. Andrew M. Lee is the executive director.

== History ==
DC Strings held its first concert in December 2016 at the Covenant Baptist Church in Southeast Washington, D.C, performing the Messiah. The concert's remarkable success led to the creation of the DC Strings Workshop (DCSW), established in 2017, a DC-based non-profit aiming to make classical music accessible to all. These were the orchestra's first steps and DC Strings Orchestra and DC Strings Chamber Orchestra were created.

Nowadays the Accord Symphony Orchestra and the Accord Chamber Orchestra are the flagship ensembles of the DC Strings Workshop. The main objectives of the orchestra are to form a high-level professional orchestra, to bring classical music to the entire DC region, to all those people who cannot afford it (who cannot afford the Kennedy Center) and also to promote diversity and plurality.

In its early years, the orchestra was directed by African-American composer and conductor Ahmed Alabaca. In 2018 Veronica Jackson took over from Alabaca as the music director and conductor of the orchestra. In 2020 Spanish conductor Juan Gallastegui was appointed orchestra's principal conductor.

By the beginning of 2023, the orchestra had performed more than one hundred concerts since its founding in the 2016–17 season.

Since 2023 French conductor Julien Benichou has been serving as the orchestra's principal conductor.

== Chief conductors ==
- Julien Benichou (2023–present)
- Juan Gallastegui (2020–2023)
- Veronica Jackson (2018–2020)
- Ahmed Alabaca (2017–2018)

== Guest conductors ==
Ahmed Alabaca, Jeri Lynne Johnson, Ángel Gil-Ordóñez, Nevilla Ottley-Adjahoe, Kevin O’Brien, Bruce Cavaniss, Jeff Kempskie, Isaiah Shim, Melissa Jean Chavez, Jeffry Newberger, Stanley Thurston, Alan Buxbaum, David E. Robinson, JoAnna Cochenet.

== Executive director ==
- Andrew M. Lee (2017–present)

== Performance venues ==
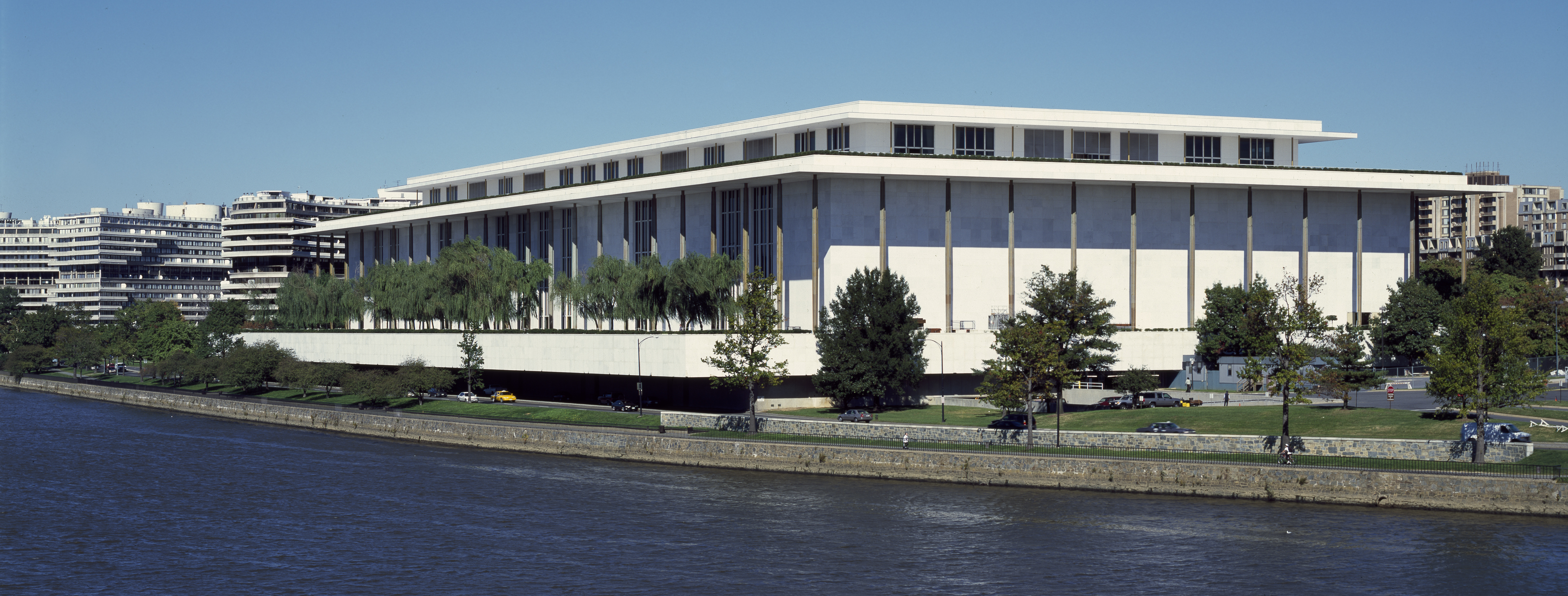
John F. Kennedy Center for the Performing Arts.

== See also ==
- Ángel Gil-Ordóñez
- Jeri Lynne Johnson
- Juan Gallastegui
- Julien Benichou
