= Ángel Gil-Ordóñez =

Spanish-born American conductor (born 1957)

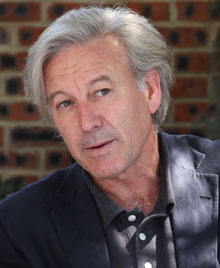
- Ángel Gil-Ordóñez
- Born: September 5, 1957 (age 68); Madrid, Spain
- Occupations: conductor, lecturer
- Years active: 1991–Present
- Organization(s): PostClassical Ensemble, Georgetown University
- Spouse: Adriana
- Awards: Royal Order of Isabella the Catholic
- Website: gilordonez.com

Ángel Gil-Ordóñez (born September 5, 1957) is a Spanish-born American musician, composer, and conductor. He co-founded the PostClassical Ensemble with music historian Joseph Horowitz and serves as its music director. He is also the principal guest conductor of New York’s Perspectives Ensemble and the music director of the Georgetown University Orchestra in Washington, D.C. Additionally, he serves as advisor for education and programming for Trinitate Philharmonia, a program in Mexico modeled on Venezuela’s El Sistema, and is also a regular guest conductor at the Bowdoin International Music Festival in Maine.

== Background ==
Born in Madrid (Spain) on September 5, 1957, Gil-Ordóñez grew up in an intellectual family that valued Spanish culture. He focused on violin in his teens. For his university studies, he reached a compromise with his family: they would allow him to study toward becoming a professional musician at the Madrid Royal Conservatory if he would first study Engineering at the Universidad Politecnica de Madrid.

Having completed both those degrees successfully, in 1974 he began higher-level music studies at the Madrid Royal Conservatory. There, he focused on violin, polyphony and choir conducting, harmony, counterpoint, and music history. He also studied in the Musical Analysis Master Classes with Jacques Chailley. He studied under Sergiu Celibidache for more than six years. He also studied with Pierre Boulez and Iannis Xenakis in France.

In 1978, a concert of Sergiu Celibidache conducting the London Symphony Orchestra made Gil-Ordóñez decide he would become a conductor too. In 1983, he moved to France to study Contemporary Music at Paris's Centre Acanthes with Iannis Xenakis (composition), Irvine Arditti (violin), James Wood (choral conducting), and Claude Helffer and Rudolph Frisius (musical analysis). He also studied with Pierre Boulez (Conducting Master Classes) in Avignon.

In 1985, he moved to Munich to study with Munich Philharmonic's conductor Sergiu Celibidache. He studied with the Münchner Philharmoniker, the Hochschule für Musik Mainz, Master Classes in Cluny and Paris, and Conducting Courses at the Scuola di Alto Perfezionamiento Musicale in Saluzzo, Italy. He performed two assistantships at the Orchesterakademie des Schleswig-Holstein Musik Festival in Germany. From 1985 to 1991, he broadened studies across European repertoire and studied composition with Günter Bialas, Paul Engel, and Fredrik Schwenk and violin with Rony Rogoff.

== Conducting ==
In 1991, Gil-Ordóñez moved back to Spain for appointment to the Spanish National Orchestra as associate conductor. He founded the chamber orchestra Academia de Madrid, of which he became music director. He was also principal guest conductor of the Classical Orchestra of Madrid.

In 1997, he moved to Washington, DC, and founded musica aperta Washington, of which he was music director 1997–2001. Also in 1997, he co-founded the IberArtists New York, Inc., of which he remains music director.

In 2000, he toured Spain with the Valencia Symphony Orchestra for the Spanish premiere of Leonard Bernstein's Mass.

On May 4, 2015, he led the Georgetown University Orchestra in a Cinco de Mayo performance for President Barack Obama.

Currently, he serves as follows:

- PostClassical Ensemble (Washington, D.C.): Music director and co-founder
- IberArtists (New York, New York): Music director and co- founder
- Perspectives Ensemble (New York, New York): Principal guest conductor
- Trinitate Philharmonia (León, Mexico): Advisor

He has also appeared with the following:

- American Composers Orchestra
- Opera Colorado
- Pacific Symphony
- Hartford Symphony
- Brooklyn Philharmonic
- Orchestra of St. Luke’s. Abroad
- Spanish National Orchestra
- Accord Symphony Orchestra

Other performance groups, venues, or events include:

- Munich Philharmonic
- Solistes de Berne
- Schleswig-Holstein Music Festival
- Bellas Artes National Theatre (Mexico City)

== Personal ==
Gil-Ordóñez is married with one child. He resides in Washington, DC.

He became an American citizen in 2009.

== Teaching ==
As an educator, Gil-Ordóñez currently serves as adjunct professor and music director at Georgetown University's Department of Performing Arts in Washington, D.C. He also serves as the music director of the Georgetown University Orchestra.

== Awards ==
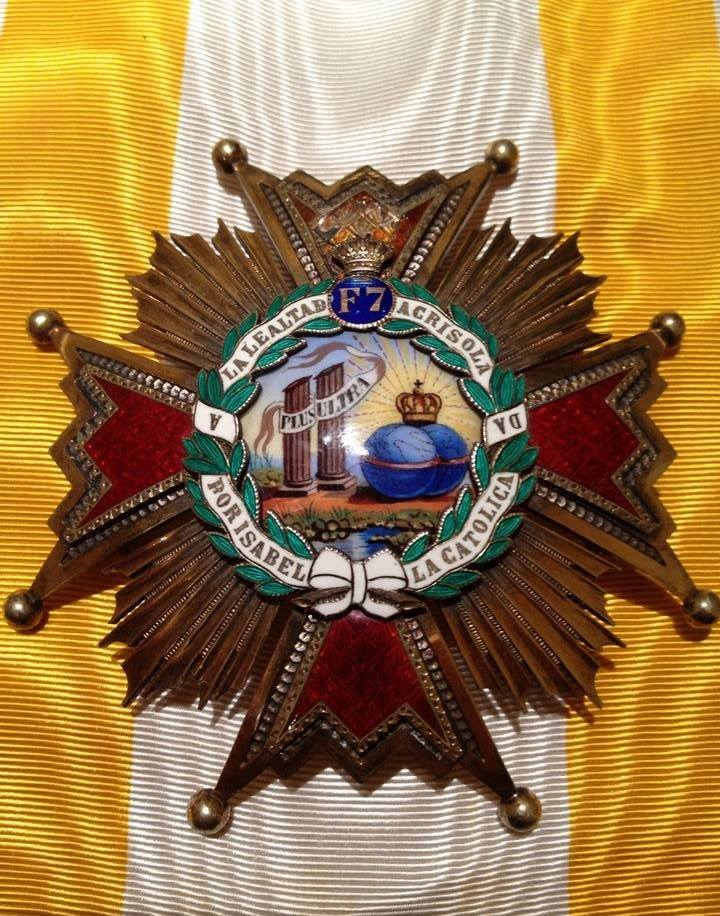
La Real Orden de Isabel la Católica (Royal Order of Isabella the Catholic)

Since 2006, Gil-Ordóñez's title in Spanish has been "Caballero de la Real Orden de Isabel la Católica."

- 2010 – WAMMIE Award for Classical
- 2006 – La Real Orden de Isabel la Católica (Royal Order of Isabella the Catholic), Spain's highest civilian decoration, awarded by the king of Spain
- Various – named 3 times Naxos "Artist of the Week"

== Works ==
Gil-Ordóñez appears on nine Naxos recordings.

=== Video (DVD) ===
- 2016 - Redes - Silvestre Revueltas (conductor)
- 2009 - The City - Aaron Copland (conductor)
- 2007 - The Plow that Broke the Plain, The River - Virgil Thomson (conductor)

=== Albums (CD) ===
- 2019 - Falla: El amor brujo (1915 original version) / El retablo de Maese Pedro - Manuel de Falla (composer)
- 2017 - Lou Harrison: Violin Concerto / Grand Duo / Double Music - Lou Harrison (composer)
- 2014 - Dvořák and America - Antonín Dvořák (conductor, arranger)
- 2014 - Xavier Montsalvatge: Madrigal sobre un tema popular / 5 Invocaciones al Crucificado / Folia daliniana - Xavier Montsalvatge (composer)
- 2013 - Madrigal sobre un tema popular, 5 Invocaciones al Crucificado, Folia daliniana - Xavier Montsalvatge (conductor)
- 2007 - The Plow that Broke the Plain, The River - Virgil Thomson (conductor)

== See also ==
- Sergiu Celibidache
- Pierre Boulez
- Iannis Xenakis
- Aaron Copland
- Virgil Thomson
- Antonín Dvořák
- Xavier Montsalvatge (conductor)
- Joseph Horowitz
- Juan Gallastegui
- Julien Benichou
