= Julien Benichou =

French and American conductor (born 1969)

- Born: Julien Bénichou; 3 November 1969 (age 56); Anduze, France
- Citizenship: France; United States
- Education: Schola Cantorum de Paris; Peabody Institute; Northwestern University; Yale University
- Occupations: Conductor; Musician; Composer
- Organizations: Mid-Atlantic Symphony Orchestra
- Parents: Maurice Bénichou (father); Anne Clément (mother)
- Honours: Knight of the Order of Arts and Letters of the French Republic (2024)
- Website: www.julienbenichou.com

Julien Benichou (born 3 November 1969) is a French and American musician, composer, and conductor.

He is principal conductor of the Accord Symphony Orchestra, artistic and general director of the Washington Opera Society, and music director of the Chesapeake Youth Symphony Orchestra. He was principal conductor of the Mid-Atlantic Symphony Orchestra for more than seventeen years between 2004 and 2021.

He has also conducted the Dallas Symphony Orchestra, the Baltimore Symphony Orchestra, the Annapolis Symphony Orchestra, the Maison Symphonique de Montreal, the Pasdeloup Orchestra of Paris, and the Marseille Chamber Orchestra.

In 2024 he was named a knight (chevalier) of the Order of Arts and Letters of the French Republic.

== Biography and career ==
Benichou was born in Anduze, France, on 3 November 1969. He is the son of the French actor and comedian Maurice Bénichou (1943–2019) and the French actress and playwright Anne Clément (1940–2023).

He began his musical training at the Marseille Conservatory with teachers such as Roland Hayrabedian and Pol Mule. He then continued his studies at the Rueil-Malmaison Conservatory with Jean-Sébastien Béreau. He furthered his training in harmony and counterpoint at the Schola Cantorum de Paris with Pierre Doury.

He moved to the United States to further his studies, where he earned a postgraduate diploma in Performance from the Peabody Institute and a master's degree from Northwestern University. He also pursued postgraduate studies at Yale University. During his postgraduate training, he worked and collaborated with teachers such as Leonard Slatkin, Yuri Temirkanov, Marin Alsop, Michael Tilson Thomas, and JoAnn Falletta. He has studied under Victor Yampolsky, Gustav Meier, and Jorma Panula.

Since 2003, he has collaborated with the Chesapeake Youth Symphony Orchestra, where he was appointed music director and conductor, a position he continues to hold today.

In 2004, he was appointed principal conductor of the Mid-Atlantic Symphony Orchestra, which he led for over seventeen years until 2021.

In 2022, Benichou was appointed artistic director, general manager, and conductor of the Washington Opera Society, succeeding Michael Reilly. Under his direction, he has promoted the premieres of operas such as Aida, Faust, and Carmen in Washington, D.C..

In 2023, Benichou was appointed principal conductor of the Accord Symphony Orchestra of Washington, D.C., taking over from Spanish conductor Juan Gallastegui, who led the orchestra for more than three years.

As a conductor, Benichou has led numerous orchestras around the world, including the Dallas Symphony Orchestra, the Baltimore Symphony Orchestra, the Annapolis Symphony Orchestra, the Paraná Symphony Orchestra (Curitaba, Brazil), the Saint Petersburg State Symphony Orchestra (Russia), the Siberian State Symphony Orchestra (Krasnoyarsk, Russia), the Maison Symphonique de Montreal (Canada), and the Portuguese Philharmonic Orchestra (Portugal). In his native France, he has conducted the Pasdeloup Orchestra of Paris, France's oldest symphony orchestra, and the Marseille Chamber Orchestra. In 2024, he was appointed permanent guest conductor of the Marseille Chamber Orchestra.

In 2023, Benichou was chosen to conduct the United Nations Day Concert 2023 "Frontlines of Climate Action", performing Environmental Symphony by Australian composer Allan Zavod, an annual event, organized by the UN and held at the UN Auditorium (New York City), which uses music to promote peace, global solidarity and international cooperation.

In 2024 Benichou was named a knight (chevalier) of the Order of Arts and Letters of the French Republic by Laurent Bili, the French ambassador to the United States.

He has lived in the United States since 1994.

== Personal life ==
He currently resides in Baltimore (United States) and the French region of Cévennes (France). In 2016 he became a naturalized US citizen, and currently holds both French and American citizenship.

== Awards and honours ==
- 2024, Knight (chevalier) of the Order of Arts and Letters of the French Republic.

== See also ==
- Leonard Slatkin
- Marin Alsop
- Ángel Gil-Ordónez
- Juan Gallastegui
