= 11th Division (German Empire) =

11th Division (11. Division); in 1870-71 and from August 2, 1914, 11th Infantry Division (11. Infanterie-Division)
- Active: 1818–1919
- Country: Prussia/Germany
- Branch: Army
- Type: Infantry (in peacetime included cavalry)
- Size: Approx. 15,000
- Part of: VI. Army Corps (VI. Armeekorps)
- Garrison/HQ: Breslau
- Engagements: Austro-Prussian War: Königgrätz Franco-Prussian War: Paris World War I: Somme

The 11th Division (11. Division) was a unit of the Prussian/German Army. It was formed in Breslau (now Wrocław, Poland) in November 1816 as a brigade, and became the 11th Division on September 5, 1818. The division was subordinated in peacetime to the VI Army Corps (VI. Armeekorps). The division was disbanded in 1919 during the demobilization of the German Army after World War I. The division was recruited primarily in the Province of Silesia, mainly in the region of Lower Silesia.

== Combat chronicle ==
The 11th Division's 21st Infantry Brigade served in the Second Schleswig War against Denmark in 1864. The division fought in the Austro-Prussian War in 1866, including the Battle of Königgrätz. In the Franco-Prussian War of 1870–71, the division fought in several battles, including the Siege of Toul and the Siege of Paris.

In World War I, the division served on the Western Front. It spent most of the war in various parts of the trenches and fought in the 1916 Battle of the Somme. Allied intelligence rated it a second class division.

== Order of battle in the Franco-Prussian War ==
During wartime, the 11th Division, like other regular German divisions, was redesignated an infantry division. The organization of the 11th Infantry Division in 1870 at the beginning of the Franco-Prussian War was as follows:

- 21. Infanterie Brigade
  - Grenadier-Regiment Nr. 10
  - Infanterie-Regiment Nr. 18
- 22. Infanterie Brigade
  - Füsilier-Regiment Nr. 38
  - Füsilier-Regiment Nr. 51
- Jäger-Bataillon Nr. 9
- Dragoner-Regiment Nr. 8

== Pre-World War I organization ==
German divisions underwent various organizational changes after the Franco-Prussian War. The organization of the 11th Division in 1914, shortly before the outbreak of World War I, was as follows:

- 21. Infanterie-Brigade:
  - Grenadier-Regiment König Friedrich Wilhelm II. (1. Schlesisches) Nr. 10
  - Füsilier-Regiment General-Feldmarschall Graf Moltke (Schlesisches) Nr. 38
- 22. Infanterie-Brigade:
  - Grenadier-Regiment König Friedrich III. (2. Schlesisches) Nr. 11
  - 4. Niederschlesisches Infanterie-Regiment Nr. 51
- 11. Kavallerie-Brigade
  - Leib-Kürassier-Regiment Großer Kurfürst (Schlesisches) Nr. 1
  - Dragoner-Regiment König Friedrich III. (2. Schlesisches) Nr. 8
- 11. Feldartillerie-Brigade:
  - Feldartillerie-Regiment von Peucker (1. Schlesisches) Nr. 6
  - 2. Schlesisches Feldartillerie-Regiment Nr. 42
- Landwehr-Inspektion Breslau

== Order of battle on mobilization ==
On mobilization in August 1914 at the beginning of World War I, most divisional cavalry, including brigade headquarters, was withdrawn to form cavalry divisions or split up among divisions as reconnaissance units. Divisions received engineer companies and other support units from their higher headquarters. The 11th Division was again renamed the 11th Infantry Division. Its initial wartime organization was as follows:

- 21. Infanterie-Brigade:
  - Grenadier-Regiment König Friedrich Wilhelm II. (1. Schlesisches) Nr. 10
  - Füsilier-Regiment General-Feldmarschall Graf Moltke (Schlesisches) Nr. 38
- 22. Infanterie-Brigade:
  - Grenadier-Regiment König Friedrich III. (2. Schlesisches) Nr. 11
  - 4. Niederschlesisches Infanterie-Regiment Nr. 51
- Jäger-Regiment zu Pferde Nr. 11
- 11. Feldartillerie-Brigade:
  - Feldartillerie-Regiment von Peucker (1. Schlesisches) Nr. 6
  - 2. Schlesisches Feldartillerie-Regiment Nr. 42
- 1. Kompanie/Schlesisches Pionier-Bataillon Nr. 6

== Late World War I organization ==
Divisions underwent many changes during the war, with regiments moving from division to division, and some being destroyed and rebuilt. During the war, most divisions became triangular - one infantry brigade with three infantry regiments rather than two infantry brigades of two regiments (a "square division"). An artillery commander replaced the artillery brigade headquarters, the cavalry was further reduced, the engineer contingent was increased, and a divisional signals command was created. The 11th Infantry Division's order of battle in 1918 was as follows:

- 21. Infanterie-Brigade
  - Grenadier-Regiment Nr. 10
  - Füsilier-Regiment Nr. 38
  - Infanterie-Regiment Nr. 51
- 2. Eskadron/Ulanen-Regiment Nr. 2
- Artillerie-Kommandeur 11
  - Feldartillerie-Regiment Nr. 42
  - Fußartillerie-Bataillon Nr. 131
- Pionier-Bataillon Nr. 122
- Divisions-Nachrichten-Kommandeur 11
