= Caché (film) =

2005 European film

- Theatrical release poster
- Directed by: Michael Haneke
- Written by: Michael Haneke
- Produced by: Veit Heiduschka; Michael Katz; Margaret Menegoz
- Starring: Daniel Auteuil; Juliette Binoche; Maurice Bénichou; Annie Girardot; Bernard Le Coq; Daniel Duval; Nathalie Richard; Denis Podalydès
- Cinematography: Christian Berger
- Edited by: Michael Hudecek; Nadine Muse
- Production companies: Les Films du Losange; Wega Film; Bavaria Film; BIM Distribuzione; Arte France Cinéma; France 3 Cinéma; ORF Film/Fernseh-Abkommen; Arte/WDR
- Distributed by: Les Films du Losange (France); Filmladen (Austria); Prokino Filmverleih (though 20th Century Fox; Germany); BIM Distribuzione (Italy)
- Release dates: 14 May 2005 (Cannes); 5 October 2005 (France)
- Running time: 118 minutes
- Countries: France; Austria; Germany; Italy
- Language: French
- Budget: €8 million
- Box office: $16.2 million

Caché (French: [kaʃe]), also known as Hidden, is a 2005 neo-noir psychological thriller film written and directed by Michael Haneke and starring Daniel Auteuil and Juliette Binoche. The plot follows an upper-middle-class French couple, Georges (Auteuil) and Anne (Binoche), who are terrorised by anonymous tapes that appear on their front porch and seem to show the family is under surveillance. Clues in the videos point to Georges' childhood memories, and his resistance to his parents' adopting an Algerian orphan named Majid, who was sent away.

Shot in Paris and Vienna in 2004, the film is an international co-production of France, Austria, Germany and Italy. Haneke wrote the screenplay with Auteuil and Binoche in mind, and with a concept of exploring guilt and childhood. When he learned of the French government's decades-long denial of the 1961 Seine River massacre, he incorporated memories of the event into his story.

Caché opened at the 2005 Cannes Film Festival to critical acclaim for the performances and Haneke's direction. Its plot ambiguities raised considerable discussion. The film has been interpreted as an allegory about collective guilt and collective memory, and as a statement on France's Algerian War and colonialism in general.

The film won three awards at Cannes, including Best Director; five European Film Awards, including Best Film; and other honours. It was controversially disqualified for the Academy Award for Best Foreign Language Film. Caché has been regarded in the years since its release as one of the great films of the 2000s, included in BBC's 100 Greatest Films of the 21st Century.

== Plot ==
Affluent Parisian couple Anne and Georges Laurent discover a videotape on their stoop which shows hours of footage of their residence, implying they are under surveillance. They debate its origin and purpose, considering whether it is a practical joke from friends of their 12-year-old son, Pierrot, or the work of fans of Georges, who hosts a literary talk show. A second tape arrives, accompanied by a childlike drawing of a person with blood streaming out of his mouth. Similar drawings are mailed to Georges' workplace and Pierrot's school. Disturbed, the Laurents turn to the police, who do not consider the tapes and drawings to be criminal activities.

Another videotape, with a drawing of a chicken bleeding at its neck, is delivered amidst a dinner party hosted by the Laurents. As Anne discloses the incidents to their friends, Georges plays the tape, which shows the estate near Aix-en-Provence where he grew up.

Georges begins to have vivid dreams about Majid, a boy he knew in his childhood. Majid's Algerian parents worked on Georges' family estate but disappeared during the 1961 Paris massacre. Georges' parents intended to adopt Majid, but the process was never finalised. Suspecting Majid might be responsible for the tapes, Georges visits his ailing mother, who surprisingly professes not to remember Majid well.

The Laurents receive another tape showing a low-income housing apartment. Georges tells Anne he has a suspect in mind, but will not say who until he can confirm his suspicion; Anne is shocked by this perceived lack of trust.

Following the clues in the tape, Georges locates the apartment off Avenue Lénine in Romainville, where Majid lives. Majid denies knowledge of the tapes or drawing, but the suspicious Georges threatens him. Unknown to Georges, a hidden camera has recorded his conversation with Majid, who breaks down crying after Georges leaves. Tapes of the encounter are subsequently sent to Anne and Georges' employer.

Georges explains to Anne that he was six when he learned of his parents' plan to adopt Majid. Disliking the plan, he told lies about Majid, who was sent away. When Pierrot disappears, the Laurents frantically contact the police, who check Majid's apartment and arrest Majid and Majid's son, though they deny involvement in kidnapping. Pierrot returns to his family, having spent time with friends, and hints to Anne that he thinks she is too close to Pierre, a family friend.

Majid calls Georges and asks him to return to the apartment. Majid denies having sent the tapes, before saying he wanted Georges to be "present" before committing suicide by slitting his throat. Georges confesses to Anne that, as a boy, he had claimed Majid was coughing up blood and convinced him to kill the family's rooster, falsely claiming that his father wanted him to do so.

The police record Majid's cause of death as a suicide, but Majid's son appears at Georges' workplace to confront him. Believing the son is responsible for the tapes, Georges threatens him to cease surveillance, but the son replies he was not involved with the tapes and wanted to know how Georges felt about being responsible for a death. Later, Majid's son is seen talking with Pierrot after school.

== Cast ==
- Daniel Auteuil as Georges Laurent
- Juliette Binoche as Anne Laurent
- Maurice Bénichou as Majid
- Annie Girardot as Georges' mother
- Bernard Le Coq as Georges' boss
- Walid Afkir as Majid's son
- Lester Makedonsky as Pierrot Laurent
- Daniel Duval as Pierre
- Nathalie Richard as Mathilde
- Denis Podalydès as Yvon
- Aïssa Maïga as Chantal
- Philippe Besson as TV guest

== Production ==
=== Historical background ===
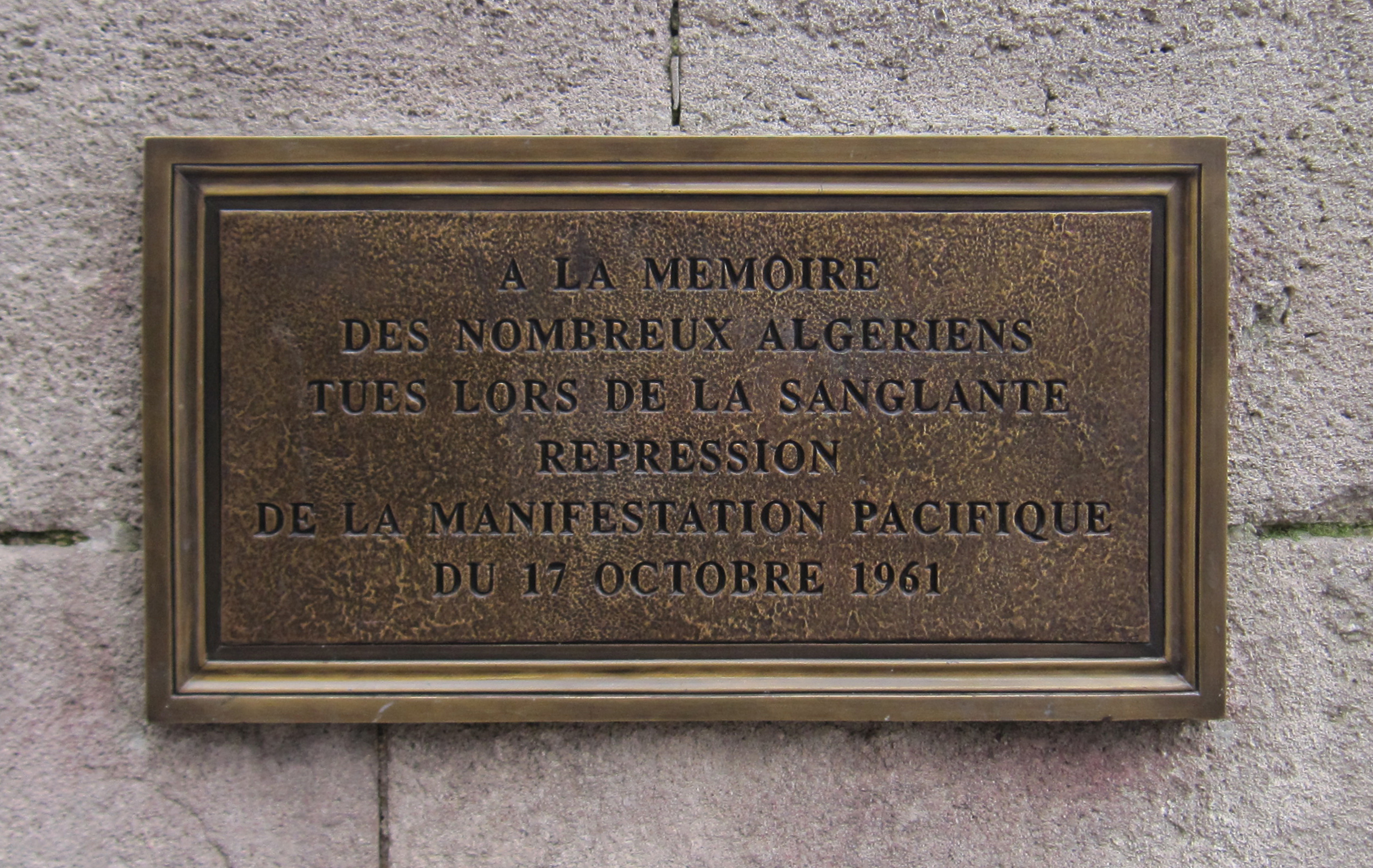
A commemorative plaque to the massacre at Pont Saint-Michel.

A basis for the story was the massacre that took place in Paris on 17 October 1961, referenced by the character Georges:

In October '61, the FLN called all Algerians to a demonstration in Paris. October 17, 1961. Enough said. Papon. The police massacre. They drowned about 200 Arabs in the Seine. Including Majid's parents most likely. They never came back. Dad went to Paris to look for them. They said he should be glad to be rid of a couple of jigaboos.

During the Algerian War, the National Liberation Front responded to the French right's attacks on France's Arabs, and as many as 200 protesters in Paris may have been shot or drowned in the Seine River. Maurice Papon was prefect of the Paris police, and previously served Vichy France; a book about Vichy is visible on Georges' shelf. In the aftermath of the massacre, the French government suppressed many of the facts by restricting police archives and delaying and cancelling public investigations, until allowing three historians to review the archives in 1998. The media reported three deaths in 1961; the massacre was not revisited until 1997 when Papon went to trial for his Vichy record.

While planning the production of Caché, Haneke learned about the massacre, and how information about it was withheld for years, after seeing a television documentary on Arte. He remarked, given France's free press, "I was totally shocked that I had never heard of this event before". He decided to work it into his story.

=== Development ===
Haneke began writing the screenplay by September 2001. He described a starting point: "I had been toying with the idea of writing a script in which someone is confronted with his guilt for something he did in childhood". In planning the film, he chose the thriller genre as a model but intended the true point to be an exploration of guilt; he deliberately left the question of who sent the tapes ambiguous:

I'm not going to give anyone this answer. If you think it's Majid, Pierrot, Georges, the malevolent director, God himself, the human conscience – all these answers are correct. But if you come out wanting to know who sent the tapes, you didn't understand the film. To ask this question is to avoid asking the real question the film raises, which is more: how do we treat our conscience and our guilt and reconcile ourselves to living with our actions? People are only asking, "whodunnit?" because I chose to use the genre, the structure of a thriller, to address the issues of blame and conscience, and these methods of narrative usually demand an answer. But my film isn't a thriller and who am I to presume to give anyone an answer on how they should deal with their own guilty conscience?

Haneke also left it ambiguous whether the young Georges' claim that Majid coughed blood was a lie, but said he viewed the depiction of Majid menacing Georges with an ax as a mere nightmare.

While the Paris massacre inspired the plot, Haneke said the story was not about a "French problem" as something unusual, remarking, "This film was made in France, but I could have shot it with very few adjustments within an Austrian – or I'm sure an American – context". Another inspiration was a story he had heard from a friend, similar to that which Denis Podalydès's character tells when claiming to have a scar matching the wound of a dog killed on the day the character was born. Haneke explained, "I wrote it down when I got home and always wanted to use it. I think it sits well here because it makes people ask if it's true or not".

While the filmmakers intended the production to be entirely French, they discovered they could not raise the funds in the one country. It received international backing from Les Films du Losange, Wega-Film, Bavaria Film and BIM Distribuzione which are respectively based in France, Austria, Germany and Italy. (Note: Les Films du Losange is based in Paris; Wega-Film in Vienna; Bavaria-Film in Munich, and BIM in Rome.) Haneke also secured funds from ORF in his native Austria, for a budget of €8 million.

=== Casting ===
Haneke stated that "Daniel Auteuil was the reason I wrote this script" and that he envisioned Auteuil and Binoche in the lead roles and had "almost all the actors in mind" while working on the screenplay. Haneke had never worked with Auteuil before, but chose him because he felt Auteuil always played his roles as if keeping a secret. Auteuil had learned of the 1961 massacre only after reading about it in L'Obs circa 1995; he accepted the role, interested in exploring the national conscience surrounding the incident, which made an impression on him. Juliette Binoche had previously starred in Haneke's 2000 Code Unknown, where her character was also named Anne Laurent. (Note: The names Anne and Georges or variations also appear in Haneke's The Seventh Continent, Benny's Video, Time of the Wolf, Funny Games (2007) and Amour.) She joined the cast, along with Auteuil, in fall 2002.

Child actor Lester Makedonsky was cast as Pierrot, and because of his swimming skills, the filmmakers chose swimming as Pierrot's sport. Haneke had also worked with Maurice Bénichou before on Code Unknown and Time of the Wolf (2003), Walid Afkir on Code Unknown. and Annie Girardot in The Piano Teacher. Nathalie Richard previously played a character named Mathilde in Code Unknown, both being friends of the two versions of Anne Laurent.

=== Filming ===
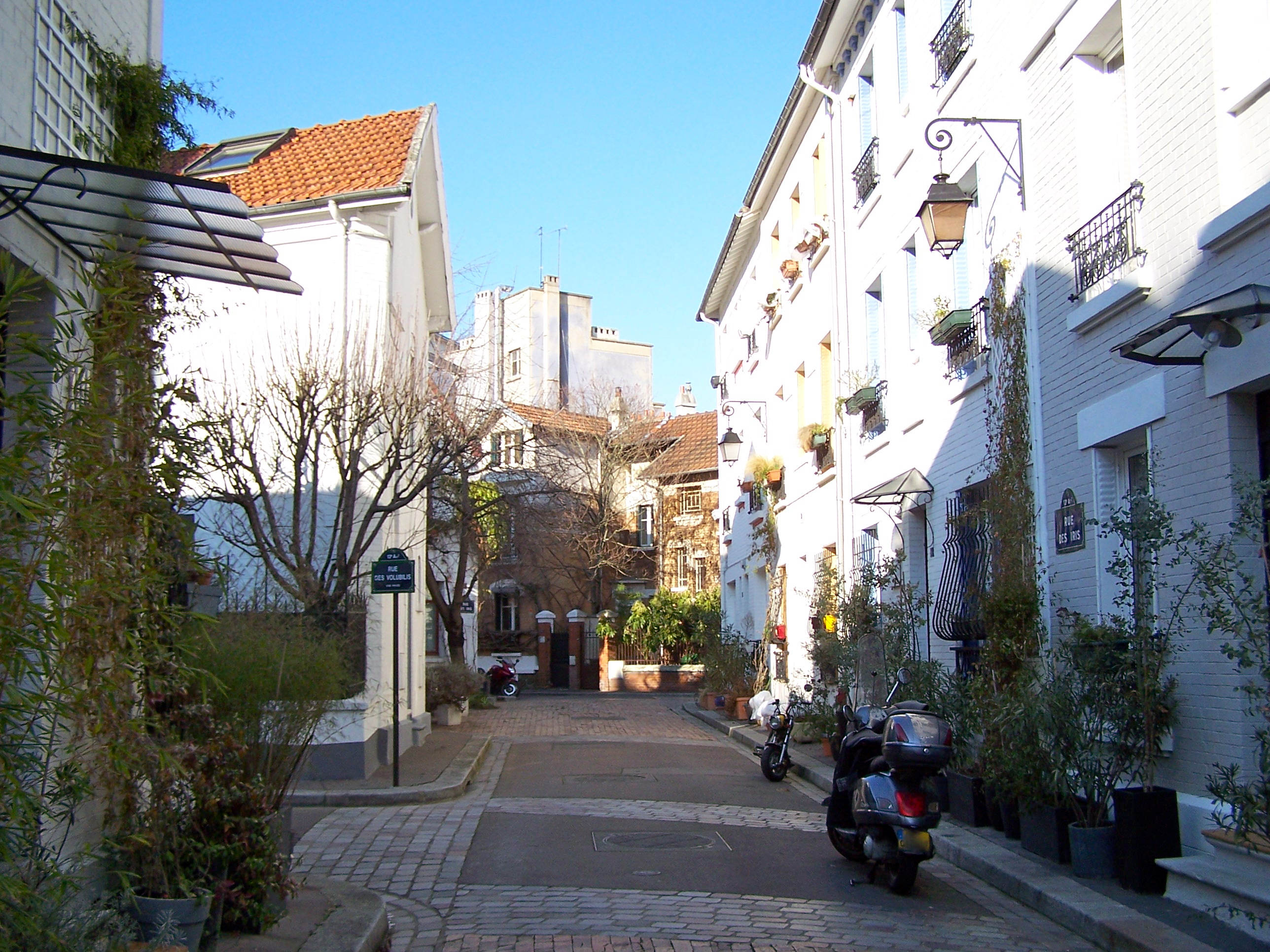
The story was partly set in Rue des Iris, Paris, which was a filming location.

Principal photography took place at Rue des Iris and Rue Brillat-Savarin, Paris, where Haneke ordered parked vehicles arranged and rearranged to match his vision and prepare for tracking shots. Majid's neighbourhood was filmed on location at Avenue Lénine in Romainville. Interior scenes at the Laurent residence were shot in Vienna, Austria in August 2004. Interior scenes for Majid's apartment were also shot in Vienna, with Paris largely used for outdoor scenes, and stairs from Paris replicated in Vienna. Haneke said most of the filming likely took place in Vienna. It was the first film he made using high-definition video cameras; it also has no score, due to Haneke's belief that music conflicts with realism.

For the scene in which a rooster is beheaded, a real chicken was used and actually killed. (Note: Animal deaths in Haneke's films have often been portrayed through the killing of an actual animal; Philosophy professor H. Peter Steeves wrote that, if Caché were a snuff film where Binoche was killed, the audience would be distracted from the story to mourn Binoche, and asks: "how do we consider the death of the rooster in that same movie? Do we mourn at all, and if we do, what are we mourning?") In the suicide scene, Haneke sought to create a realistic effect, remarking "if the suicide scene is not plausible then the entire film is spoiled". In the final scene, Lester Makedonsky and Walid Afkir are speaking dialogue Haneke scripted, but Haneke chose not to publish it and left it inaudible, and instructed the actors to never disclose it. Haneke chose a wide shot and positioned the extras so that viewers might not notice Makedonsky and Afkir. He described post-production as marked by arduous work on fixing the sound.

== Themes and interpretations ==
=== Colonialism ===
Themes of collective memory and guilt over colonialism run through Caché. When Majid commits suicide, Haneke connects "the personal and collective conscience", and how neither Georges nor his society has acknowledged the violence of colonialism, according to professor Ipek A. Celik. Scholar Susannah Radstone argues that while critics focused on the film as a statement on the Algerian War in particular, the story is generally about "the trauma of violence perpetuated upon the colonized and the guilt that now ought rightfully to be acknowledged by the colonial power". The French people refusing to accept the full truth of a moment of shame, the Paris massacre, underlines the scene where Georges tells Anne about Majid, according to academic Elsie Walker, with the pauses punctuating Georges' monologue belying the shame. After stating the date, Georges adds "Enough said", indicating the event was better-known by 2005, but also seemingly affirming silence about it; Walker points out that Georges ironically follows this with details. Professor Russell J. A. Kilbourn writes that Georges had suppressed his memories and his sense of guilt and that for Haneke, trauma is lived in the present through memory. Georges' dream, in which he sees young Majid kill the rooster, and then menace him with the ax, "presents a spectacle of real death in the place of any simulation or reconstruction of the events of October 1961", author Michael Lawrence writes.

Present-day conflicts such as the Iraq War and the Israeli–Palestinian conflict are depicted through a Euronews broadcast seen in the film. Author Patrick Crowley writes these are used to represent "the return of the colonial repressed ... within contemporary forms of imperialism", and that they are connected to the Paris massacre and the Holocaust. The film's connection between the Seine River massacre and the Holocaust, including Vichy's collaboration with the Nazis, is through Papon. The violence of colonialism, lasting into the present, is also depicted as entering private homes and the media in "hidden" ways, according to essayist Brianne Gallagher.

Radstone argues the focus on surveillance and Georges' confrontation with a black cyclist indicate the perspective is that of "the privileged and anxious white middle class". Academic Eva Jørholt argues the film illustrates how white paranoia in the aftermath of colonialism explains racial discrimination in modern France. According to film studies scholar Maria Flood, Majid is largely kept invisible, and his suicide scene confronts viewers with society's marginal people. Celik added that historical revisionism in denying colonial crimes made Caché well-timed for 2005, with the rise of Jean-Marie Le Pen and the National Front.

=== Surveillance ===
Professor Todd Herzog states that after the 11 September 2001 attacks, mass surveillance became commonplace. Herzog adds that Caché follows a tradition of cinema about surveillance, including Blow-Up (1966) and The Conversation (1974), but that Caché is distinctive in being "about being looked at rather than looking at something or someone". Haneke reveals life without privacy, Herzog writes. Qian He of the University of Washington writes the precise question of who is watching is the "question that haunts our daily life"; Caché is one film that explores the question, answers to which have included Google, Big Brother and God. Philosopher William G. Smith tied Haneke's ambiguity as to the sender of the tapes to philosopher Friedrich Nietzsche's writings on interpretation, quoting Haneke: "There are 1,000 truths. It's a matter of perspective".

The setting of Rue des Iris has symbolic significance, as "iris" refers to a part of the human eye and to a camera diaphragm. Film studies professor Catherine Wheatley also observes a man sitting behind Anne and Pierre in the café and observing them. Lecturer Judit Pieldner observes Georges' shelves are lined with CDs, DVDs and videotapes, amounting to a celebration of media technology. The length of the tapes the Laurents receive is also stated at two hours, a nod to the typical capacity of VHS and Hi-8 videotape.

Academic Jehanne-Marie Gavarini notes photography was employed to preserve memory in the 19th and 20th centuries, suggesting the videos in the story serve to assist remembering, as opposed to being evidence of surveillance as a terror tactic. Editors Amresh Sinha and Terence McSweeney also identified Caché as part of a 21st-century trend of films concerned with memory, along with Memento, Mulholland Drive, Eternal Sunshine of the Spotless Mind and Pan's Labyrinth. Gavarini quotes philosopher Martin Heidegger:

The fact that the world becomes picture at all is what distinguishes the essence of the modern age ... When, accordingly, the picture character of the world is made clear as the representedness of that which is, then in order fully to grasp the modern essence of representedness we must track out and expose the original naming power of the worn-out word and concept 'to represent'".

Drawing on Heidegger's theories, Gavarini concludes Caché is a statement on "the virtual space of the screen".

=== Character studies ===
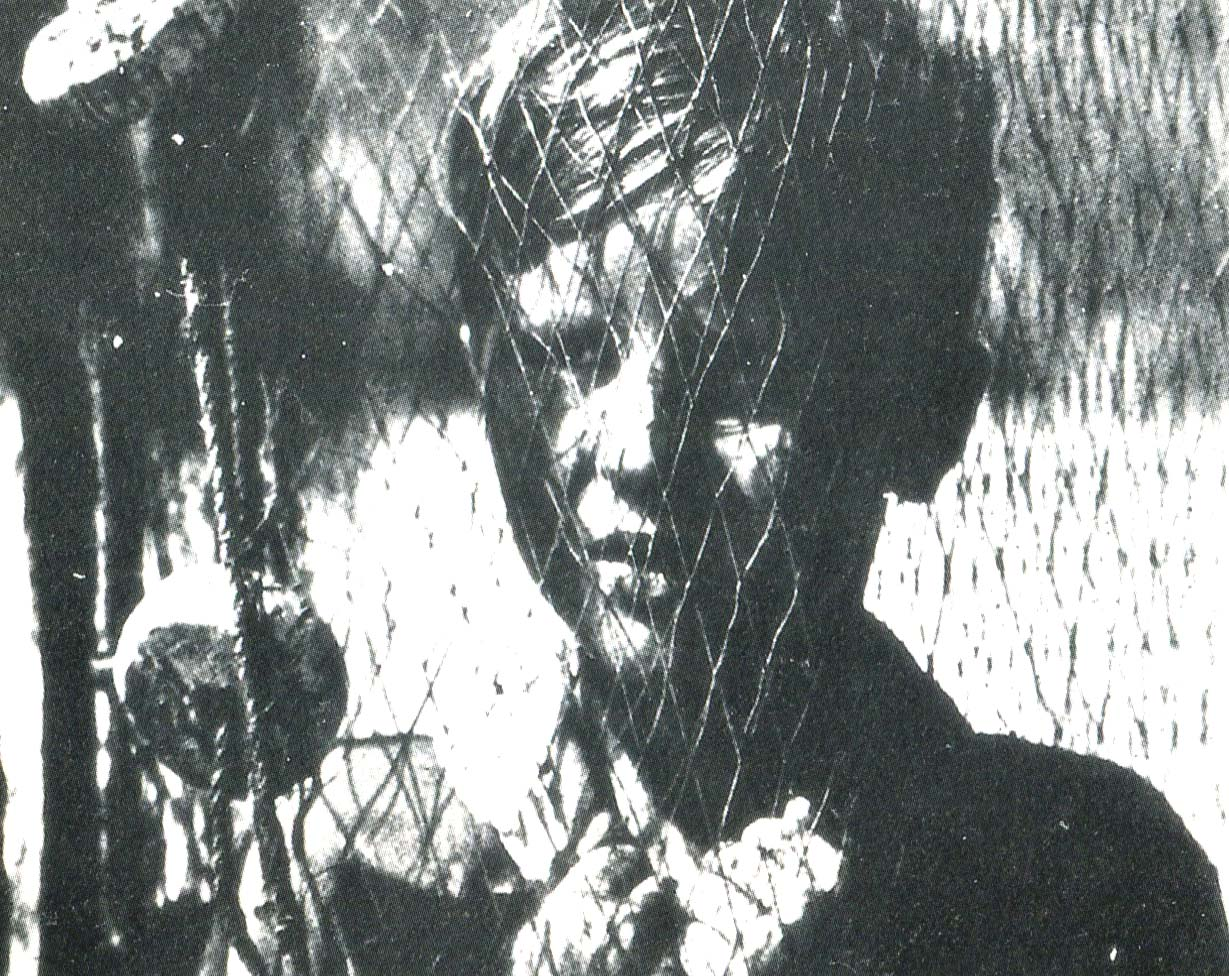
The Children Are Watching Us (1944) shares themes with Caché.

Scholar Hugh S. Manon hypothesises the surveillance represents psychiatrist Jacques Lacan's "le regard – 'the gaze'", as psychoanalysis, which Georges wishes to avoid. Manon suggests that unlike Hidden, the French title Caché has a double meaning, referencing "masks" silent film cinematographers used to block parts of shots to highlight another element.

Georges' general paranoia is observed in his failure to be open and forthright with his friends and employer. In his mind, "the enemy is everywhere", Wheatley writes. Smith considers the lack of communication between Georges and Anne originates "from everything that was swept under the rug".

Anne's position as "moral compass" is made ambiguous by hints of possible adultery with Pierre, according to Wheatley. While no sex is shown, the characters' closeness in their café scene makes the notion appear possible though uncertain. Film professor Christopher Sharrett judges Pierrot's suspicions to be correct, given how Anne seeks Pierre for comfort, and suggests Pierrot "sees far more" than Anne realises. Pierrot's "mysterious, hostile behaviour", including accusing his mother of adultery, invites suspicion that he is behind the tapes. Wheatley compares Pierrot, as a child rebel against his elders, to the Funny Games murderers and the children in Haneke's 2009 The White Ribbon. Academic Giuseppina Mecchia likened the film to Italian neo-realism in using a child's perspective to reveal adult dishonesty: child characters reveal Georges' dishonesty. Italian director Vittorio De Sica's 1944 The Children Are Watching Us has similar themes.

Majid may also be trying to cope with trauma, with Gavarini writing Majid lives in poverty, "still haunted by the disappearance of his parents". There is a class separation between Majid and Georges, as Majid lives in an HLM and the settings reveal "markers of racial, cultural, and class-based polarizations", according to film studies professor Malini Guha. (Note: Given the conditions of poverty, the name Avenue Lénine might be provocative; Avenue Lénine is a real-world street in Romainville, Paris named after Soviet leader and revolutionary Vladimir Lenin.) Gavarini identifies him as the guilty party in the tapes, and submits the drawings attached to the tapes are Majid's attempts at understanding his past, and communicating these thoughts to Georges, unable to verbally communicate them. The viewer is invited to ponder what Majid's son has inherited from his father; Georges questions the son on "what dumb obsession [Majid] passed down", though Wheatley argues that if the son is telling the truth that Majid raised him properly, he would not hate Georges.

Haneke had previously used the names Anne and Georges Laurent in Code Unknown and Anna and Georg in Funny Games (1997). Binoche played Anne Laurent in Code Unknown and Caché, and Mathilde is Anne's friend in both films. Lawrence suggests Haneke used this character-naming method to downplay "individualization" and allow the audience to see the characters as "multiple versions of a particular type". Haneke himself said that he sought short character names to avoid "any hidden metaphorical meaning" detracting from realism.

== Style ==
Generally, Haneke's style has been described as displaying "an aesthetics of dread"; a feeling of "existential dread" or "ambient dread" is also present in Caché. The story has been described as a "psychological thriller"; the British Film Institute stated it employs "classical suspense strategies" to enter the thriller genre. Wheatley adds the techniques differ from the Hitchcockian style by withholding information from the audience until characters disclose it, and not being clear as to whether the characters are honest and whether the flashbacks are real. (Note: In contrast, director Alfred Hitchcock would give the audience more information than the characters have; Wheatley writes "Thus the audience must know, for example, that a bomb is hidden in the child's parcel but the child himself must not".) According to Radstone, the style is characterised by "its closed-in camerawork, its aesthetic and narrative concerns with surveillance, its claustrophobic interiority". Film studies professor Oliver C. Speck has written that Haneke rejected "pseudo-realism" in its recreations of Georges' childhood.

Though it resembles a whodunit, the film does not reveal who sent the tapes. A solution may not be possible, as given the setting and the camerawork, the camera could not record without being seen when Georges looks into it, Herzog writes. This suggests Haneke himself is sending the tapes in the story. Georges has no reason to send the tapes to himself and Anne, and the idea that Georges is unconsciously and psychically producing the tapes contradicts the realistic style.

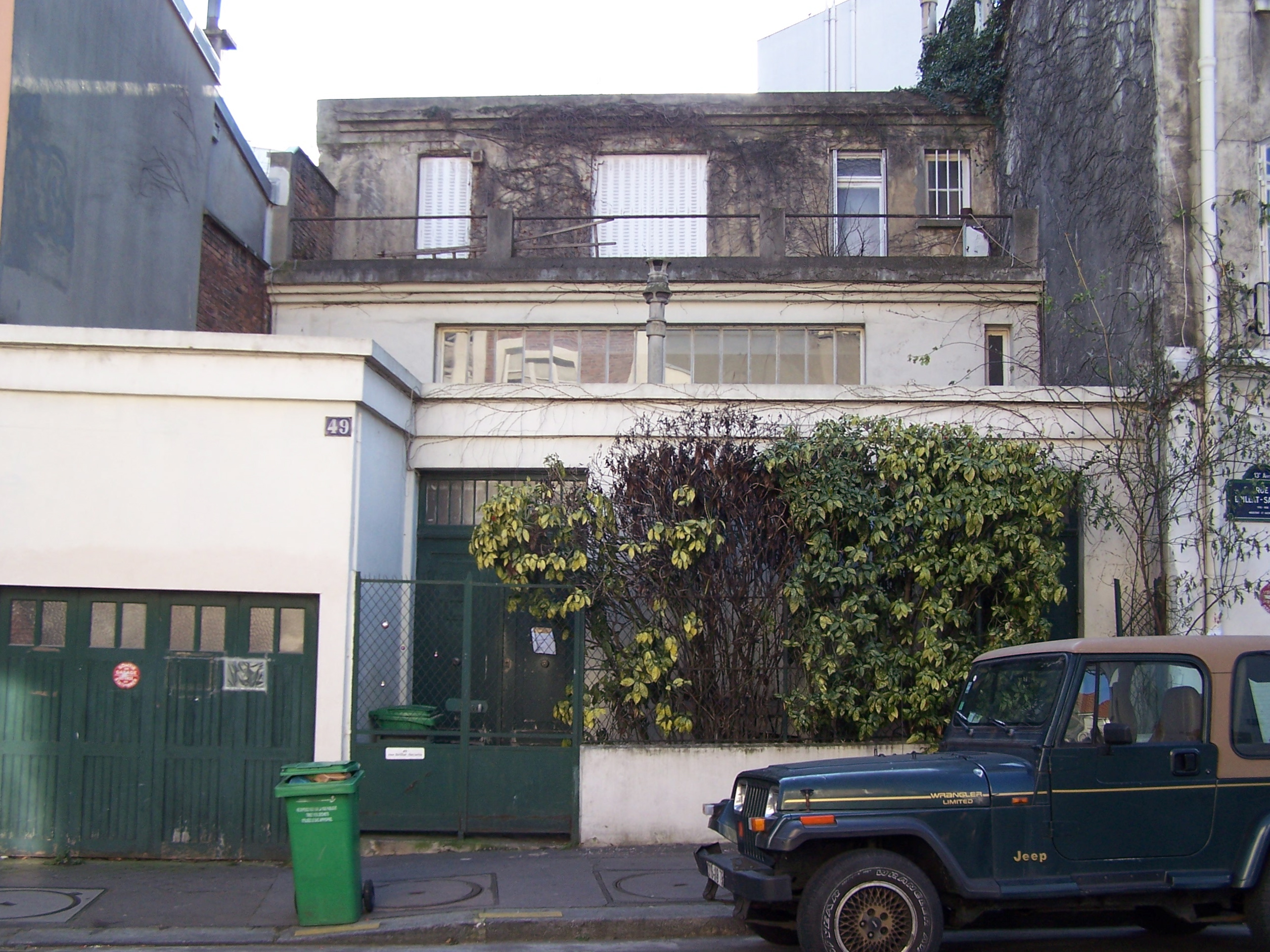
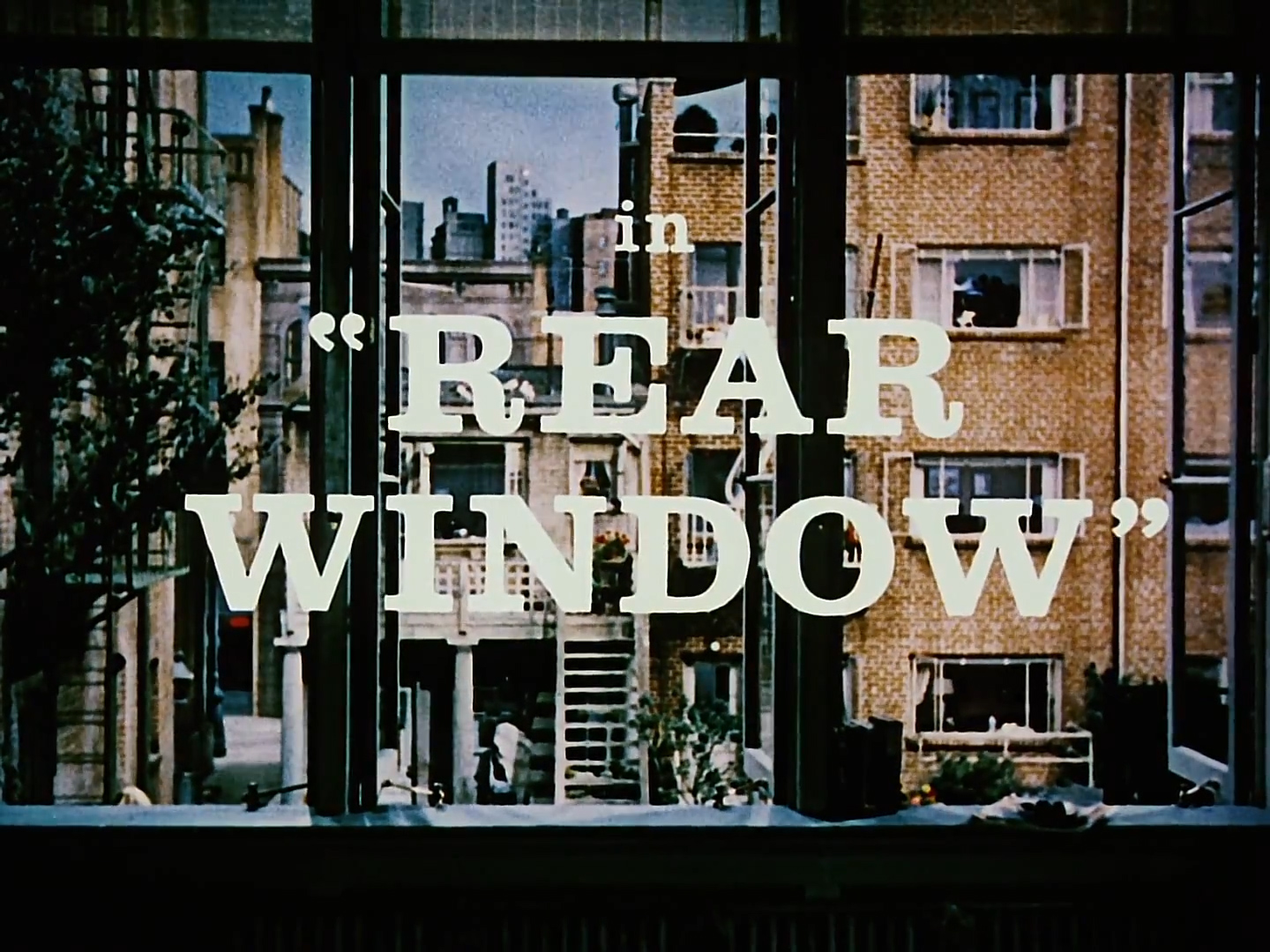
The house shown in the opening shots of Caché, filmed in Brillat-Savarin, Paris, and Alfred Hitchcock's similarly surveillance-themed Rear Window.

Noting that the opening sequence is characterised by a lengthy take in which the camera is stationary and focused on a street, with a "crowded composition" and a two-storey house in the centre, essayist Jonathan Thomas compares this to a photograph, along with sounds of birds, and described it as "idyllic". Professor Brigitte Peucker calls it "slice-of-life realism", comparing it to the opening of Alfred Hitchcock's similarly surveillance-themed Rear Window (1954). The opening credits appear over the shot, in a style suggesting they are being typed. After two minutes and no cut, the "stillness" starts to "weigh" on the viewer. Pieldner compared this to Italian director Michelangelo Antonioni's technique of temps mort, where a shot goes on even after the storytelling seems to have ceased.

Wheatley notes the "painstaking arrangement" of the four-minute final shot's mise-en-scène, inviting viewers to seek clues, though many viewers missed the meeting between the sons suggesting they are co-conspirators. The shot is still, with two doors in symmetry, parents wearing brown and beige, and a "content murmur".

Throughout the film, images are spliced, from the "dramatic present", "prerecorded video", seeing Georges on television, and flashbacks, according to Thomas. Gavarini asserts that the opening is deceptive as to whether the viewer is seeing from the protagonists' perspective, producing "confusion between the director's camera and the diegetic video" and involving the audience as perpetrators of the surveillance. Speck likens the lengthy takes to "visual rhymes". Thomas writes that the high definition makes them "materially homogeneous", with no grain or noise. Speck adds that the digital film clouds distinctions between the surveillance footage and other scenes, removing "ontological certainty". The colour scheme, observable in the Laurents' apartment, focuses on grey, brown and beige and communicates dissatisfaction; Haneke had employed it before in The Piano Teacher.

In the stressful scene where Anne and Georges realise Pierrot is missing, Euronews plays in the background covering Barbara Contini in Iraq and Palestinians being killed in a protest; Walker notes that the background volume remains louder than the Laurent dialogue, while "classical realism" would require the viewer to lose interest in the background news.

== Release ==
By fall 2002, Mars Distribution had signed on as the French distributor. The film premiered at the Cannes Film Festival in May 2005, where distributors purchased distribution rights, including Sony Pictures Classics for the United States, English-speaking Canada and Mexico. It subsequently screened at the 2005 Toronto International Film Festival, the Telluride Film Festival and the New York Film Festival.

In France, Caché opened on 5 October 2005. Its poster featured a blood spray alluding to the suicide scene. It opened in New York City and Los Angeles on 23 December 2005, and in the United Kingdom on 27 January 2006, distributed by Artificial Eye. To market the film, Artificial Eye designed a trailer with no music and heavy dialogue with subtitles, emphasising a complicated plot. By the end of January, Sony expanded the release to Chicago, Boston, San Francisco, Montreal, and other cities. The UK Film Council also approved Caché, under the title Hidden, for screenings in multiplexes, based on an assessment it could have commercial appeal.

It was released on DVD in Region 1 in June 2006, along with Yves Montmayeur's documentary Hidden Side. That month, Artificial Eye also published a single-disc Region 2 DVD, later including it in its The Essential Michael Haneke DVD boxset in October 2009.

== Reception ==
=== Box office ===
By the beginning of November, Les Films du Losange found the film was performing "strongly" in France. In the United States and Canada, Sony moved it from 10 to 22 screens by 25 January 2006 to gross $718,406. It opened in the United Kingdom making £169,000 in its first weekend, reaching £1 million by 24 March 2006.

The film finished its run grossing $3.6 million in the U.S. and £1.1 million in the U.K., more than any previous Haneke film in either country. It grossed US$16,197,824 worldwide. Peter Cowie and Pascal Edelmann summarised Caché's box-office performance as having "considerable success".

=== Critical reception ===
Rotten Tomatoes reported an 89% approval rating based on 135 reviews, with an average rating of 7.85/10. The website's critical consensus reads "A creepy French psychological thriller that commands the audience's attention throughout". On Metacritic, which assigns a normalized rating out of 100 based on reviews from critics, the film has a score of 83 based on 37 reviews, indicating "universal acclaim".

In Le Monde, Jean-François Rauger wrote that while Haneke may be heavy-handed in his negative outlook and use of news about war in the Middle East playing the background, the atmosphere of terror deserved credit. Le Parisien gave it three out of four stars, declaring it an excellent thriller, citing Annie Girardot for her performance as the mother. For Les Inrockuptibles, Serge Kaganski compared the opening to David Lynch's Lost Highway and wrote the suspense developed from there, and that Binoche and Auteuil convey the anxiety, Auteuil more internally. Variety critic Deborah Young reviewed Haneke's pacing favorably and found themes of responsibility, regarding France and Algeria but tied into the United States and Europe in the Iraq War. The Hollywood Reporter's Kirk Honeycutt credited the film for a thorough exploration of "guilt, communication and willful amnesia", and praised the cinematography.

Film Comment contributor Michael Joshua Rowin considered it Haneke's most political work to date, "not merely liberal hand wringing" in its depiction of "passive-aggressive oppression and its manifestation as a slow-building, unresolved societal tension". A. O. Scott wrote that while he could criticise it as a liberal exercise in inducing guilt, it was "hard to deny its creepy, insinuating power". Roger Ebert awarded it four stars, lauding its focus on "paranoia and distrust" rather than providing a whodunit conclusion, and remarking on the way characters hide so much from each other, reflecting the title. The Guardian's Peter Bradshaw gave the film five out of five stars, describing it as "one of the great films of this decade" and "Haneke's masterpiece". For the BBC, Matthew Leyland gave it four stars, citing the mounting suspense over themes of guilt. In a review for The Atlantic, Christopher Orr described Caché as "a broad political allegory about Western guilt and a meditation on the nature of seeing." Film Quarterly critic Ara Osterweil compared Caché to the 1966 Blow-Up in making "challenges naïve assumptions of ocular mastery".

Caché's detractors include Andrew Sarris of The New York Observer, who wrote "Too much of the plot's machinery turns out to be a metaphorical mechanism by which to pin the tail of colonial guilt on Georges and the rest of us smug bourgeois donkeys". In the San Francisco Chronicle, Mick LaSalle called it "a handsome fraud...in its style, technique and ultimate message", becoming dull and "a drab social polemic". The Nation's Stuart Klawans judged it not a statement of "liberal guilt" but "liberal self-regard" in having Majid choose to die for Georges' sake, in Klawans's interpretation. Jonathan Rosenbaum of The Chicago Reader called Caché a "brilliant if unpleasant puzzle without a solution", writing that "Haneke is so punitive toward the couple and his audience that I periodically rebelled against—or went into denial about—the director's rage, and I guess that's part of the plan." Calum Marsh of Slant Magazine writes that in Caché "Haneke’s predilection for deceit served a high-minded, if still somewhat suspect, intellectual purpose".

Ebert added the film to his Great Movies list in 2010, expressing disbelief about missing a possible "smoking gun" after two viewings, crediting Juliette Binoche for a naturalistic performance, and pondered the 1961 massacre: "Has France hidden it in its memory?" Also in 2010, Ebert further explored the whodunit question, considering the motives of various characters. Ebert questioned whether the last scene's encounter between Pierrot and Majid's son is the first time they met, or one of many encounters. He concluded Majid's son must be at least partly responsible and that Pierrot is a possible accomplice, as it is not clear where he is in many scenes. In his 2014 Movie Guide, Leonard Maltin gave it three stars, calling it "icily meticulous, if protracted".

In 2009, Caché was named 44th in The Daily Telegraph's list of "The films that defined the noughties", and 36th in The Guardian's "100 best films of the noughties". The film was ranked 73rd in Empire magazine's "The 100 Best Films Of World Cinema" in 2010. Caché received 19 total votes in the 2012 Sight & Sound polls of the greatest films ever made; it is 154th among critics and 75th among directors. In 2016, critics also voted it the 23rd best in BBC's 100 Greatest Films of the 21st Century.

=== Accolades ===
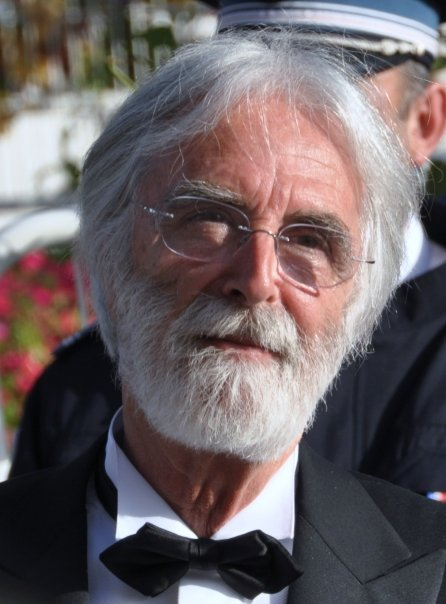
Michael Haneke won Best Director at the 2005 Cannes Film Festival.

Caché competed for the Palme d'Or at the 2005 Cannes Film Festival, where polled critics and festival audiences considered it a frontrunner. Ultimately, the jury awarded Haneke Best Director. It went on to win numerous other awards. At the European Film Awards, it competed with the Cannes Palme d'Or winner, L'Enfant by the Dardenne brothers, with Caché winning five awards, including Best Film.

The film was submitted as Austria's entry for Best Foreign Language Film at the 78th Academy Awards, but was disqualified as French is not predominantly the language of Austria. As Haneke is Austrian, it would have also been disqualified if France or any other country had submitted it. (Note: The Academy of Motion Picture Arts and Sciences set a rule in 1984 that a country's submission for Best Foreign Language Film must have "artistic control" from a "creative talent of that country".) The exclusion sparked criticism, with Sony Pictures Classics co-president Michael Barker calling the exclusion "unfortunate" and saying the story demanded the film be in French. Austria's Fachverband der Audiovisions und Filmindustrie protested the criteria, and Haneke, whose previous French-language The Piano Teacher was not disqualified as the Austrian submission, also called the rules "really stupid". Academy member Mark Johnson responded, "We're in the process right now of considering some very radical changes".

== Legacy ==
The film's French release preceded the 2005 French riots, beginning with three deaths on 27 October; professor Gemma King writes the film offered a progressive perspective in contrast to the real-life divisions in the wake of the riots. According to Walker, the riots' occurrence shortly after the film's release made it seem "uncannily resonant"; Radstone cites the riots to interpret the film as a statement on racial tensions felt by whites. King observes Caché is one of a growing number of French films that take a progressive view of the country's colonial past, and that films about Algeria became more common in later years.

On February 19, 2007, Ron Howard was set to direct and produce an American version of Caché for Universal Pictures.

Following the film's disqualification at the Academy Awards, the academy revised its rules so as to emphasise the filmmaker's origin over the country's language for eligibility for Best Foreign Language Film. Subsequently, Haneke's 2012 French-language Amour won the award for Austria.

In 2015, IndieWire reporter Ryan Lattanzio reported rumours that U.S. producers had wanted to remake Haneke's film and compared Joel Edgerton's The Gift to a remake. Variety critic Scott Foundas also said The Gift resembled Caché in attempting to explore a "moral and existential minefield". Edgerton cited Caché as an influence on The Gift, and has said Haneke's film illustrates "how unsettled you can be by the thing you never see". He added "The idea of a villain who is able to actively dismantle another person's life from the shadows is often scarier" than a visible threat.

In 2025, it was one of the films voted for the "Readers' Choice" edition of The New York Times' list of "The 100 Best Movies of the 21st Century," finishing at number 213.

== See also ==
- List of films featuring surveillance
- List of Austrian submissions for the Academy Award for Best Foreign Language Film
- List of submissions to the 78th Academy Awards for Best Foreign Language Film
