= List of accolades received by Caché =

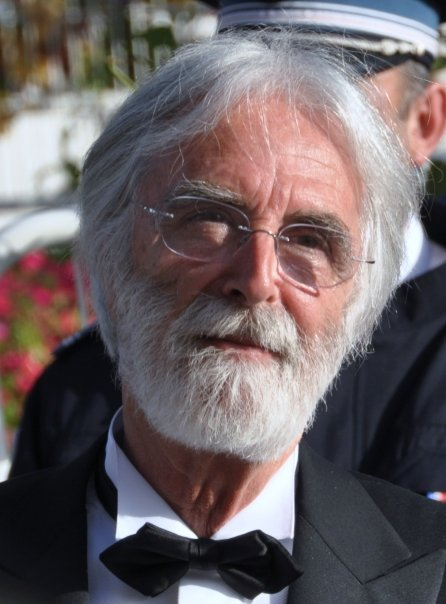
- Michael Haneke won Best Director at the 2005 Cannes Film Festival for Caché.
Accolades
Award	Won	Nominated
Academy of Motion Picture Arts and Sciences of Argentina	0	1
Bodil Awards	0	1
British Independent Film Awards	1	1
Cannes Film Festival	3	3
César Awards	0	4
Chicago Film Critics Association	1	1
Critics' Choice Awards	0	1
David di Donatello	0	1
Diagonale	2	2
Empire Awards	0	1
European Film Awards	5	8
Film Critics Circle of Australia	1	1
Gopo Awards	0	1
Guldbagge Awards	0	1
London Film Critics Circle	0	2
Los Angeles Film Critics Association	1	1
Lumière Awards	1	1
Nastro d'Argento	1	2
National Society of Film Critics	0	1
New York Film Critics Circle	0	1
Online Film Critics Society	0	1
San Francisco Film Critics Circle	1	1
Valladolid International Film Festival	1	1
Village Voice Film Poll	0	3
- Total number of awards and nominations
Totals	18	41
- References

Caché, also known as Hidden, is a 2005 psychological thriller film written and directed by Michael Haneke and starring Daniel Auteuil, Juliette Binoche and Maurice Bénichou. The plot follows an upper-class French couple, Georges (Auteuil) and Anne (Binoche), who are terrorised by anonymous tapes that appear on their front porch and seem to show the family is under surveillance. Shot in Paris and Vienna in 2004, the film is a co-production of France, Austria, Germany and Italy. The French government's decades-long denial of the 1961 Seine River massacre was an inspiration to the story.

Caché competed for the Palme d'Or at the 2005 Cannes Film Festival, where polled critics and festival audiences considered it a frontrunner. Ultimately, the jury awarded Haneke Best Director. At the European Film Awards, it competed with the Cannes Palme d'Or winner, L'Enfant by the Dardenne brothers, with Caché winning five awards, including Best Film.

The film was submitted as Austria's entry for the Academy Award for Best Foreign Language Film at the 78th Academy Awards, but was disqualified as French is not predominantly the language of Austria. As Haneke is Austrian, it would have also been disqualified if France or any other country had submitted it. The exclusion sparked criticism, with Sony Pictures Classics co-president Michael Barker calling it "unfortunate" and saying the story demanded the film be in French. Austria's Fachverband der Audiovisions und Filmindustrie protested the criteria, and Haneke, whose previous French-language The Piano Teacher was not disqualified as the Austrian submission, also called the rules "really stupid". Academy member Mark Johnson responded, "We're in the process right now of considering some very radical changes".

== Accolades ==
Award	Date of ceremony	Category	Recipient(s)	Result	Ref(s)
Academy of Motion Picture Arts and Sciences of Argentina	December 2006	Best Foreign Film	Michael Haneke	Nominated	
Bodil Awards	25 February 2007	Best Non-American Film	Michael Haneke	Nominated	
British Independent Film Awards	29 November 2006	Best Foreign Independent Film	Michael Haneke	Won	
Cannes Film Festival	11 – 22 May 2005	Best Director	Michael Haneke	Won	
Cannes Film Festival	11 – 22 May 2005	FIPRESCI Prize	Michael Haneke	Won	
Cannes Film Festival	11 – 22 May 2005	Prize of the Ecumenical Jury	Michael Haneke	Won	
César Awards	25 February 2006	Best Director	Michael Haneke	Nominated	
César Awards	25 February 2006	Best Original Screenplay	Michael Haneke	Nominated	
César Awards	25 February 2006	Best Supporting Actor	Maurice Bénichou	Nominated	
César Awards	25 February 2006	Most Promising Actor	Walid Afkir	Nominated	
Chicago Film Critics Association	9 January 2006	Best Foreign Language Film	Michael Haneke	Won	
Critics' Choice Awards	9 January 2006	Best Foreign Language Film	Michael Haneke	Nominated	
David di Donatello	2006	Best European Film	Michael Haneke	Nominated	
Diagonale	March 2005	Best Director	Michael Haneke	Won	
Diagonale	March 2005	FIPRESCI Prize	Michael Haneke	Won	
Empire Awards	27 March 2007	Best Thriller	Michael Haneke	Nominated	
European Film Awards	3 December 2005	Best Film	Michael Haneke	Won	
European Film Awards	3 December 2005	Best Director	Michael Haneke	Won	
European Film Awards	3 December 2005	Best Screenwriter	Michael Haneke	Nominated	
European Film Awards	3 December 2005	Best Actor	Daniel Auteuil	Won	
European Film Awards	3 December 2005	Best Actress	Juliette Binoche	Nominated	
European Film Awards	3 December 2005	Best Editor	Michael Hudecek and Nadine Muse	Won	
European Film Awards	3 December 2005	Best Cinematographer	Christian Berger	Nominated	
European Film Awards	3 December 2005	FIPRESCI Prize	Michael Haneke	Won	
Film Critics Circle of Australia	2006	Best Foreign Language Film	Michael Haneke	Won	
Gopo Awards	2007	Best European Film	Michael Haneke	Nominated	
Guldbagge Awards	30 January 2006	Best Foreign Film	Michael Haneke	Nominated	
London Film Critics Circle	8 February 2006	Actress of the Year	Juliette Binoche	Nominated	
London Film Critics Circle	8 February 2006	Foreign Language Film of the Year	Michael Haneke	Nominated	
Los Angeles Film Critics Association	10 December 2005	Best Foreign Language Film	Michael Haneke	Won	
Lumière Awards	21 February 2006	Best Screenplay	Michael Haneke	Won	
Nastro d'Argento	2006	Best Female Dubbing	Alessandra Korompay (for dubbing Juliette Binoche in the Italian version)	Won	
Nastro d'Argento	2006	Best Foreign Director	Michael Haneke	Nominated	
National Society of Film Critics	8 January 2006	Best Foreign Language Film	Michael Haneke	3rd Place	
New York Film Critics Circle	8 January 2006	Best Foreign Language Film	Michael Haneke	Runner-up	
Online Film Critics Society	16 January 2006	Best Foreign Language Film	Michael Haneke	Nominated	
San Francisco Film Critics Circle	12 December 2005	Best Foreign Language Film	Michael Haneke	Won	
Valladolid International Film Festival	October 2006	50th Anniversary Prize	Michael Haneke	Won	
Village Voice Film Poll	2006	Best Film	Michael Haneke	8th Place	
Village Voice Film Poll	2006	Best Director	Michael Haneke	4th Place	
Village Voice Film Poll	2006	Best Screenplay	Michael Haneke	5th Place	
