= PostClassical Ensemble =

21st-century classical music ensemble

- Orchestra
- Short name: PCE
- Founded: 2003
- Location: Washington, D.C., United States
- Concert hall: Harman Center for the Arts
- Music director: Angel Gil-Ordoñez
- Website: www.postclassical.com

The PostClassical Ensemble (PCE) is a classical music ensemble from Washington, D.C. The organization was founded by conductor Angel Gil-Ordoñez and music historian Joseph Horowitz in 2003.

== History ==
For the first period of its history, the PCE performed in a variety of locations in the Washington, D.C. area. The ensemble debuted in 2005 with a performance of “Celebrating Don Quixote,” featuring a commissioned production of Manuel de Falla’s puppet opera Master Peter's Puppet Show, along with rarely heard works by Óscar Esplá and Roberto Gerhard. In the 2000s, the ensemble received a $200,000 grant from the Andrew W. Mellon Foundation.

In 2016, PCE's presentation of three American documentaries, The Plow that Broke the Plains, The River, and The City, with original scores by Virgil Thomson generated two Naxos DVDs. The score for the Mexican docu-film Redes, on another DVD release, received a strongly positive view from the Los Angeles Times, and its festival honoring the works of Bernard Herrmann was praised by several U.S. music critics for highlighting Herrmann's works.

== Activities ==
PostClassical Ensemble's repertoire emphasizes music composed after 1900, producing the work of artists such as Lou Harrison, Bernard Herrmann, and Silvestre Revueltas.

PCE has collaborated with such artists as pianists Jeremy Denk, Benjamin Pasternak, Alexander Toradze, William Wolfram, clarinetist David Krakauer, baritones Christòpheren Nomura and William Sharp, bass-baritone Kevin Deas, pipa virtuoso Min Xiao-Fen, and other international artists.

The group is an artistic partner of Georgetown University as well as an educational partner of the National Gallery of Art.

== Music directors ==
- Angel Gil-Ordoñez 2003–present
