= Peukert =

Peukert is a surname:

- Detlev Peukert (1950–1990), German historian
- Josef Peukert (1855, Albrechtsdorf an der Adler – 1910, Chicago), a Bohemian-Austrian anarchist
- Karl Peukert (1902–1962), German actor
- Leo Peukert (1885–1944), German actor
- Randolf Peukert (1929–2009), German athlete
- Wolfgang Peukert (born 1958), German process engineer
- Wilhelm Peukert (1855–1932), German scientist

== See also ==
- Peucker and Peuker
- Peukert's law – relating battery capacity to discharge rate
