= Peucker =

Peuker, Peucker is the German surname of:

- Brigitte Peucker (born 1948), German academic
- Caspar Peucer (or Peucker) (1525–1602), German reformer, mathematician, astronomer, medic, diplomat and writer
- Ken Peucker (1935–2005), Australian rules footballer

== See also ==
- Peukert
- Peuckert
