= Mark Gibson (conductor) =

Mark Gibson is an American conductor and educator.

== Education ==
Mark Gibson is an American conductor and educator known for his work in both symphonic and operatic repertoire. He began his formal music training at Dartmouth College, where he earned a Bachelor of Arts in Music. His advanced studies in conducting were pursued at the University of Michigan, where he completed both a Master of Music and a Doctor of Musical Arts degree in conducting. During his time at Michigan, Gibson studied under Gustav Meier and attended various masterclasses and workshops with notable conductors such as Leonard Bernstein and Kurt Masur.

== Career ==
Gibson’s longest and most distinguished tenure has been at the University of Cincinnati College-Conservatory of Music (CCM), where he serves as Professor of Conducting and Director of Orchestral Studies. At CCM, Gibson has been instrumental in shaping the school’s conducting program and overseeing performances by the college’s orchestras and opera productions. His influence on young conductors and musicians has extended beyond the classroom, as he has regularly been invited to guest conduct at institutions such as the New World Symphony and the Tanglewood Music Center.

In addition to his academic work, Gibson has led numerous professional orchestras and opera companies in the United States and internationally. He has conducted performances with the Cincinnati Symphony Orchestra, the Chicago Symphony Orchestra, and the National Symphony Orchestra, among others. His work in opera has taken him to major venues, including the San Francisco Opera, the New York City Opera, and the Opera Theatre of Saint Louis. Internationally, Gibson has conducted in Europe and Asia, including performances with the Seoul Philharmonic and the Singapore Symphony Orchestra.

Gibson is also the author of The Beat Stops Here: Lessons on and off the Podium for Today's Conductor, a textbook and guide for conductors, which has been widely used in academic programs and professional workshops.
