= Michael Repper =

American orchestra conductor

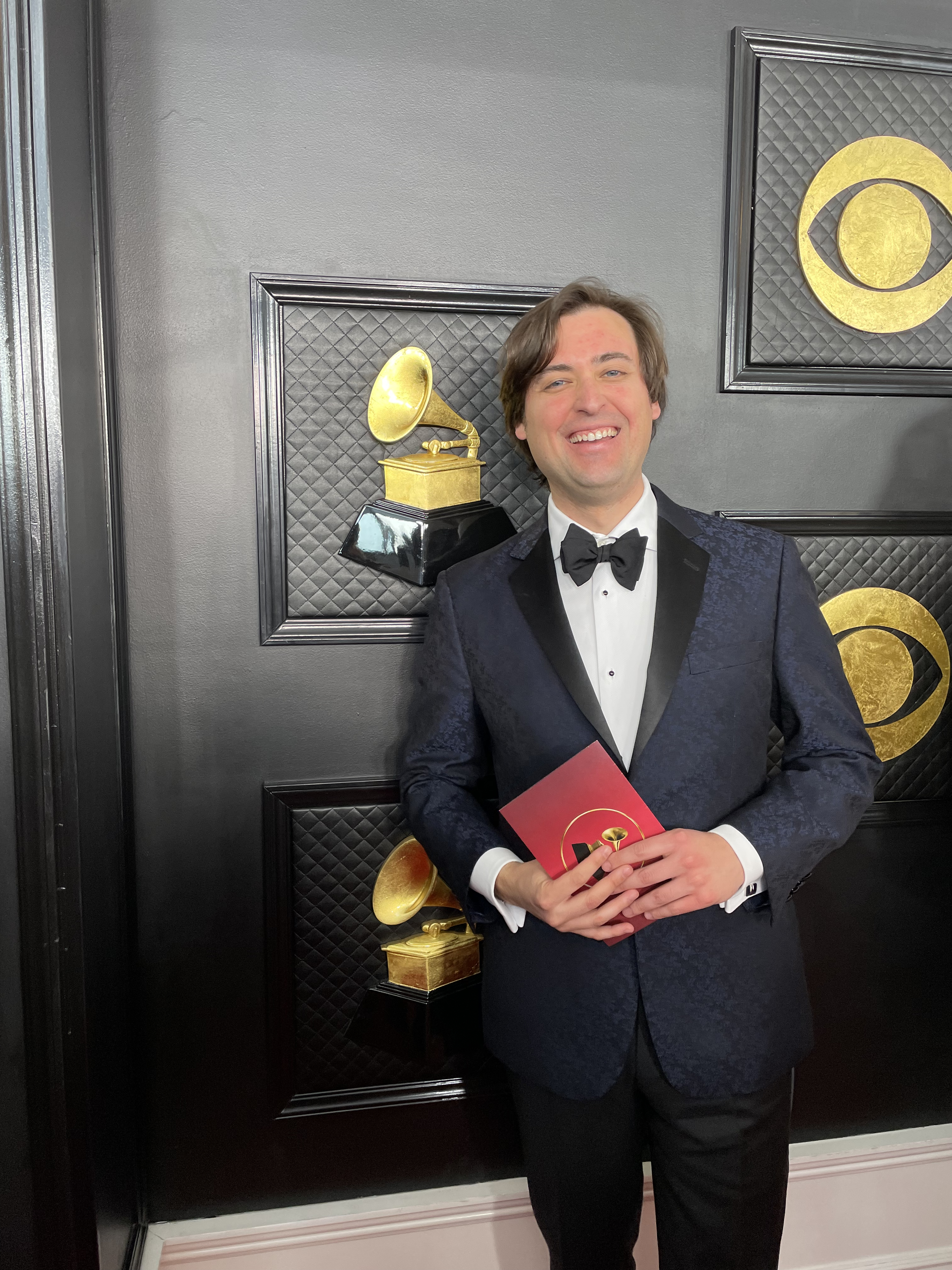
- Michael Repper at the 2023 Grammy Awards

Background information
- Born: September 25, 1990 (age 35); Orange, California
- Genres: Classical
- Occupation: Conductor
- Instrument: Piano
- Website: mikerepper.com

Michael Repper (born September 25, 1990) is an American orchestral conductor and the music director of the Ashland Symphony Orchestra, the Northern Neck Orchestra, and the Mid-Atlantic Symphony Orchestra. He served as music director of the New York Youth Symphony until 2023, during which time the ensemble won a Grammy Award for Best Orchestral Performance. He was the conducting fellow of the Baltimore Symphony Orchestra from 2014 to 2016.

== Early life and education ==
Repper was born in Orange, California to Claudia Gold Repper, an emergency physician, and David Repper. He graduated from the Orange County School of the Arts in 2008, and received a Bachelors of Arts (2012) and Masters of Arts in music (2013) from Stanford University. In 2022, he graduated from the Peabody Conservatory of Music as a Doctor of Musical Arts, a student of Marin Alsop and Gustav Meier.

== Career ==
=== Early career ===
Repper grew up in Orange County, California and attended the Pacific Symphony's family concerts with his grandmother, where he was inspired to take piano lessons. He was invited to study piano in Melbourne, Australia with Nehama Patkin when he was 8 years old, and it was in Australia that he conducted an orchestra for the first time. After he returned to the United States when he was 9, he began to study conducting formally with Marin Alsop. After attending Stanford University, Michael attended the Peabody Conservatory of Music, where he studied with Gustav Meier and served as the assistant conductor of the Peabody Orchestras and Choruses. He was also the conducting fellow of the Baltimore Symphony.

=== Music director ===
In 2016, Repper became the 17th music director of the New York Youth Symphony, which performs at Carnegie Hall. Under his direction, the New York Youth Symphony earned international honors, winning a Classical Digital Award in 2020 and the Grammy Award for Best Orchestral Performance in 2023, becoming the first youth orchestra in history to achieve this recognition.

Repper became the music director of the Ashland Symphony Orchestra and the Mid-Atlantic Symphony Orchestra in 2022. He is regularly seen as a guest conductor in the United States and around the world.

== Honors and achievements ==
- 2020, 2021, 2022 Solti Foundation US Career Assistance Awards
- Classical Music Digital Award 2020: Best Lockdown Project (Mahler Symphony No. 1, Mvt 2 – New York Youth Symphony)
- #1 Billboard Traditional Classical Chart: Works by Florence Price, Jessie Montgomery, Florence Price (New York Youth Symphony)

=== Grammy Awards ===
Year	Category	Nominated work	Result	Ref.
2023	Best Orchestral Performance	Works by Florence Price, Jessie Montgomery, Valerie Coleman	Won	
