= Mid-Atlantic Symphony Orchestra =

Orchestra in Maryland and Delaware, US

- Orchestra
- Short name: MSO
- Founded: 1997
- Location: Maryland and Delaware
- Website: https://midatlanticsymphony.org/

The Mid-Atlantic Symphony Orchestra (MSO) is the only professional symphony orchestra that serves Maryland's Eastern Shore and southern Delaware. The MSO brings classical music to concert-going audiences and music students through symphonic programs, discovering and developing musical talents, and providing a cultural and educational presence in the region.

The MSO's music director is Michael Repper, a 2023 Grammy Award winning conductor, nominated for two 2026 Grammy Awards for Best Orchestral Performance and Best Classical Instrumental Solo.

== History ==
The MSO was established for the Mid-Atlantic region in October, 1997, after a two-year grassroots effort led by Eastern Shore residents. In November, 1997, the orchestra's first concert was performed in Ocean City, Maryland. The MSO has been led by three music directors—founding conductor Donald Buxton (1997–2004), conductor Julien Benichou (2004–2021), and current conductor Michael Repper (2022–present). The MSO is guided by a volunteer board of directors in collaboration with the MSO's professional musicians and regional volunteer ambassadors who assist in promoting the MSO in their respective areas.

== Performance venues ==
The MSO's full season of performances includes five concerts that are given three times at different venues in the Atlantic coastal areas of Maryland's Easton, Ocean City and Ocean Pines; and of southern Delaware's Rehoboth Beach and Lewes. In addition to these five concerts are the Elizabeth Loker International Concerto Competition held in Easton and throughout the region, ensemble performances for brass, string, and woodwind quintets, as well as a woodwind & strings ensemble.

== Notable premiere ==
The MSO presented the state premieres of Peter Boyer’s Rhapsody in Red, White & Blue for Maryland and Delaware audiences in May, 2024. The musical work was commissioned by and featured internationally acclaimed pianist Jeffrey Biegel. The work celebrates the 100th anniversary of George Gershwin’s Rhapsody in Blue and America's 250th anniversary. Boyer's work premieres in each of the 50 states through 2025.

== Community outreach ==
The MSO engages students and young musicians in the world of classical music through its outreach programs. In addition to reaching students and young musicians, MSO delivers a course through the public library system that introduces adults to symphony orchestras.

=== Regional Schools ===
Guest musicians from the MSO support local school music teachers by mentoring primary and secondary music students during their regularly scheduled music classes.

=== Elizabeth Loker International Concerto Competition ===
The annual Elizabeth Loker International Concerto Competition, established in the 2019–2020 season, discovers and develops young musical talent worldwide. Musicians, aged 12 to 25, vie for 3 spots as solo finalists for the competition. Each finalist performs with the MSO's full orchestra. For the last three seasons, 398 young musicians, representing 27 states and 16 countries, have competed. In addition to playing with the orchestra, the three finalists are awarded cash prizes for 1st, 2nd, and 3rd place, as well as for the audience-favorite. The competition's name honors Elizabeth Loker (1948–2015) for her years of dedication to the MSO.

== Honors ==
Maryland State Senator Adelaide C. Eckardt honored the MSO in December, 2022, with an 'Official Citation of the Senate of Maryland' for the orchestra's 25 years of enriching the cultural life of the Mid-Atlantic Region.

The Yale School of Music recognized the orchestra's efforts in introducing school-age children to instrumental music with the '2016 Distinguished Educator Award' to JoFran Falcon (1930–2022), then MSO's vice president of education and outreach.

== MSO Legacy Awards ==
The annual MSO Legacy Awards are presented to individuals who have demonstrated exceptional dedication and support to advancing classical music and the arts in the Mid-Atlantic region, thereby fostering a legacy for future generations. In addition to regional recognition, in the 2024–2025 season, MSO established a National Legacy Award to recognize individuals who have demonstrated "...a profound and lasting impact on the arts at a national level". The recipient of the national award for the 2025–2026 season was world-renowned mezzo-soprano Denyce Graves.
