= Joseph Horowitz =

American cultural historian (born 1948)

Horowitz in 2016

Joseph Horowitz (born 1948 in New York City) is an American cultural historian who writes mainly about the institutional history of classical music in the United States. As a concert producer, he promotes thematic programming and new concert formats. His tenure as artistic advisor and subsequently executive director of the Brooklyn Philharmonic at the Brooklyn Academy of Music (1992–1997) attracted national attention for its radical departure from tradition. He is the host of the "More than Music" radio series on 1A, distributed by NPR.

== Life and work ==
In his books, Horowitz posits that the late 19th century was the apex of American classical music, before it degenerated into a "culture of performance,“ spotlighting celebrity conductors and instrumentalists, whom he terms “performance specialists" in contradistinction to the composer/performers of an earlier era. He is credited (as by Alex Ross of The New Yorker) with coining the phrase "post-classical music" to describe an emerging 21st-century musical landscape merging classical music with popular and non-Western genres.

Horowitz's treatment of late Gilded Age culture challenges prevalent notions of "social control" and "sacralization" as defined by such cultural historians as Alan Trachtenberg and Lawrence Levine. In Wagner Nights: An American History and Classical Music in America: A History of Its Rise and Fall, he argues that American classical music of the late nineteenth century cannot be viewed as an instrument of affluent elites. In Understanding Toscanini: How He Became an American Culture-God and Helped Create a New Audience for Old Music, he treats the “Toscanini cult” of the mid-twentieth century as a metaphor for the decline of classical music in the United States, arguing that the conductor Arturo Toscanini became the first non-composer to be widely regarded the "world's greatest musician", and that no prior conductor of comparable eminence and influence had been so divorced from the music of his own time. Wagner Nights also proposes that American Wagnerism of the 1880s and 1890s was (compared to European and Russian Wagner movements) distinctly meliorist and "proto-feminist", the vast majority of American Wagnerites having been women.

Dvorak's Prophecy and the Vexed Fate of Black Classical Music (2022; winner of an ASCAP Deems Taylor/Virgil Thomson Award) creates a "new paradigm" for the history of American classical music, replacing the standard narrative popularized by Aaron Copland and Virgil Thomson and instead privileging Charles Ives, George Gershwin, and Black classical music.

In 2002, Horowitz co-created PostClassical Ensemble (PCE), a chamber orchestra in Washington, D.C., for which he served as executive director, then executive producer through 2022. For Naxos, he produced nine PCE CDs and four DVDs featuring little-known American works. He also directed Music Unwound (restarted later as Music Unwrapped), a national consortium of orchestras and universities originally funded by the National Endowment for the Humanities. During the COVID-19 pandemic, he wrote and produced a series of six Naxos documentary films called "Dvorak’s Prophecy". This led to his "More than Music" series for NPR, broadcast via 1A. He has released two more books,The Marriage: The Mahlers in New York (his first novel) and The Propaganda of Freedom: JFK, Shostakovich, Stravinsky and the Cultural Cold War. He is also active as a vocal accompanist.

As a composer, Horowitz co-created (with music historian Michael Beckerman) a piece called Hiawatha Melodrama for narrator and orchestra, incorporating text by Longfellow. His Mahlerei, a concertino for bass trombone and chamber ensemble, adapts the Scherzo from Mahler's Fourth Symphony. He collaborated with choreographer Igal Perry on a Mahler/Schubert song cycle and dance piece titled Einsamkeit.

As a concert producer, Horowitz was an artistic advisor to the Schubertiade at New York's 92nd Street Y, for which he created all-day Schubert symposium incorporating film, Lieder, and chamber music (1981–1994). During his tenure with the Brooklyn Philharmonic, the orchestra received the 1996 Morton Gould Award for Innovative Programming from the American Symphony Orchestra League (ASOL), as well as five ASCAP/ASOL awards for Adventuresome Programming. According to Alex Ross in The New Yorker (November 1997), "When Joseph Horowitz became executive director, the Brooklyn Philharmonic more or less went off the grid of American orchestral culture. The subscription-series template – overture, concerto, symphony – has been thrown away. Programs have become miniature weekend festivals."

Beginning in 1999, Horowitz has served as a freelance artistic consultant; he has conceived more than five dozen thematic interdisciplinary music festivals for a variety of orchestras and performing arts institutions. Funded by the National Endowment of the Humanities, he created "Music Unwound," which produced festivals linking orchestras with educational institutions.

Horowitz was a music critic for The New York Times from 1976 to 1980. From 1998 to 2011, he was a regular contributor to The Times Literary Supplement; he has also written for a variety of scholarly publications, including The New Grove Dictionary of Music and Musicians. He is the author of the articles on classical music for both The Oxford Encyclopedia of American History and The Encyclopedia of New York State. He is the recipient of fellowships from the Guggenheim Foundation in 2001, the National Endowment for the Humanities (twice), and the National Arts Journalism Program at Columbia University, and has served as project director of a National Education Project, "Dvorak in America", for the National Endowment for the Humanities. He serves as artistic director of an annual music critics institute for the National Endowment for the Arts. In 2004, he was awarded a certificate of appreciation by the Czech Parliament "for his exceptional explorations – both as a scholar and as the organizer of Dvorak festivals throughout the United States – of Dvorak’s historic sojourn in America". He has taught at the City University of New York, the Eastman School of Music, the Mannes School of Music, and New England Conservatory.

== Books ==
- Conversations with Arrau (1982)
- Understanding Toscanini: How He Became an American Culture-God and Helped Create a New Audience for Old Music (1987)
- The Ivory Trade: Music and the Business of Music at the Van Cliburn International Piano Competition (1990)
- Wagner Nights: An American History (1994)
- The Post-Classical Predicament: Essays on Music and Society (1995)
- Dvořák in America: In Search of the New World (for young readers, 2003)
- Classical Music in America: A History of Its Rise and Fall (2005)
- Artists in Exile: How Refugees from War and Revolution Transformed the American Performing Arts
- Moral Fire: Musical Portraits from America's Fin de Siècle (2012)
- "On My Way": The Untold Story of Rouben Mamoulian, George Gershwin, and Porgy and Bess (2013)
- Dvorak's Prophecy: And the Vexed Fate of Black Classical Music (2021)
- The Marriage: The Mahlers in New York (a novel, April 2023)
- The Propaganda of Freedom: JFK, Shostakovich, Stravinsky and the Cold War (October 2023)
- The Disciple: A Wagnerian Tale from the Gilded Age (a novel, March 2026)
