= Maurice Bénichou =

French actor (1943–2019)

- Born: Maurice Bénichou; 23 January 1943; Tlemcen, French Algeria
- Died: 14 June 2019 (aged 76); Paris, France
- Citizenship: France
- Occupation: Actor
- Spouse(s): Anne Clément, Geneviève Mnich
- Children: Julien Benichou
- Relatives: Charles Bénichou (brother)

Maurice Bénichou (23 January 1943 in Tlemcen, French Algeria – 14 June 2019) was a French actor. His best known roles include three collaborations with director Michael Haneke (Code inconnu, Le Temps du Loup, and Caché), and a part in Jean-Pierre Jeunet's Amélie. He has also played in Peter Brook's 1989 film version of The Mahabharata.

== Filmography ==
- 1969: Paris n'existe pas (directed by Robert Benayoun)
- 1972: Les Camisards (directed by René Allio) - Moïse Plantat
- 1973: Le Mariage à la mode (directed by Michel Mardore)
- 1976: Le Petit Marcel (directed by Jacques Fansten) - Garcia
- 1976: Un éléphant ça trompe énormément (directed by Yves Robert) - Gonthier
- 1977: La Question (directed by Laurent Heynemann) - Vincent
- 1977: L'Animal (directed by Claude Zidi) - Le valet
- 1978: Dirty Dreamer (directed by Jean-Marie Périer) - Taupin
- 1978: Les Routes du sud (directed by Joseph Losey) - Garcia
- 1978: La Vocation suspendue (directed by Raoul Ruiz) - Le membre de la Dévotion #1
- 1979: I... comme Icare (I as in Icarus) (directed by Henri Verneuil) - Robert Sanio, l'homme à la caméra
- 1981: Le Jardinier (directed by Jean-Pierre Sentier) - The overseer
- 1981: Instinct de femme (directed by Claude Othnin-Girard) - Le conférencier des rats
- 1982: Qu'est-ce qui fait courir David ? (directed by Elie Chouraqui) - Albert
- 1990: The Mahabharata (TV Mini-Series) (directed by Peter Brook) - Kitchaka
- 1990: La Fracture du myocarde (directed by Jacques Fansten) - Le voisin
- 1993: La Petite apocalypse (directed by Costa-Gavras) - Arnold
- 1993: Fausto (directed by Rémy Duchemin) - Lucien
- 1993: Tout le monde n'a pas eu la chance d'avoir des parents communistes (directed by Jean-Jacques Zilbermann) - Bernard
- 1994: Les Patriotes (directed by Éric Rochant) - Yuri
- 1997: Mordbüro (directed by Lionel Kopp) - Léo Stoychev
- 1998: L'homme est une femme comme les autres (Man Is a Woman) (directed by Jean-Jacques Zilbermann) - Père de Rosalie / Rosalie's father
- 2000: Drôle de Félix (directed by Olivier Ducastel and Jacques Martineau) - Fisherman
- 2000: Code inconnu (directed by Michael Haneke) - The Old Arab
- 2000: Quand on sera grand (directed by Renaud Cohen) - Isaac
- 2000: Amélie (directed by Jean-Pierre Jeunet) - Dominique Bretodeau
- 2001: Candidature (directed by Emmanuel Bourdieu) - Le président du jury
- 2002: C'est le bouquet ! (directed by Jeanne Labrune) - Antoine
- 2003: Le Temps du Loup (directed by Michael Haneke) - M. Azoulay
- 2003: Qui perd gagne ! (directed by Laurent Bénégui) - Serge Vaudier
- 2005: Caché (directed by Michael Haneke) - Majid
- 2005: Le Passager (directed by Éric Caravaca) - Joseph
- 2007: Boxes (directed by Jane Birkin) - Max
- 2007: Le Candidat (directed by Niels Arestrup) - Maxime - écrivain
- 2007: Les Toits de Paris (directed by Hiner Saleem) - Amar
- 2008: Paris (directed by Cédric Klapisch) - Le psy
- 2008: Passe-passe (directed by Tonie Marshall) - Serge
- 2008: Le Grand Alibi (directed by Pascal Bonitzer) - Lieutenant Grange
- 2008: Inju: The Beast in the Shadow (directed by Barbet Schroeder)- L'agent d'Alex Fayard
- 2009: La Grande Vie (directed by Emmanuel Salinger) - Kowalski
- 2009: Jusqu'à toi (directed by Jennifer Devoldère) - Le réceptionniste / Receptionist
- 2009: Mensch (directed by Steve Suissa) - Simon Safran
- 2011: Si tu meurs, je te tue (directed by Hiner Saleem) - L'employé de la morgue
- 2011: The Rabbi's Cat (directed by Antoine Delesvaux and Joann Sfar)- Le rabbin (voice)
- 2011: Omar Killed Me (directed by Roschdy Zem) - Jacques Vergès
- 2011: L'amour fraternel (TV Movie) (directed by Gérard Vergez) - Père Chanu
- 2011: Au cas où je n'aurais pas la palme d'or (directed by Renaud Cohen) - Le rabbin / Maurice Bénichou
- 2015: The Kind Words (directed by Shemi Zarhin) (in Hebrew) - Maurice Lyon (final film role)
