= Jeri Lynne Johnson =

African American female conductor

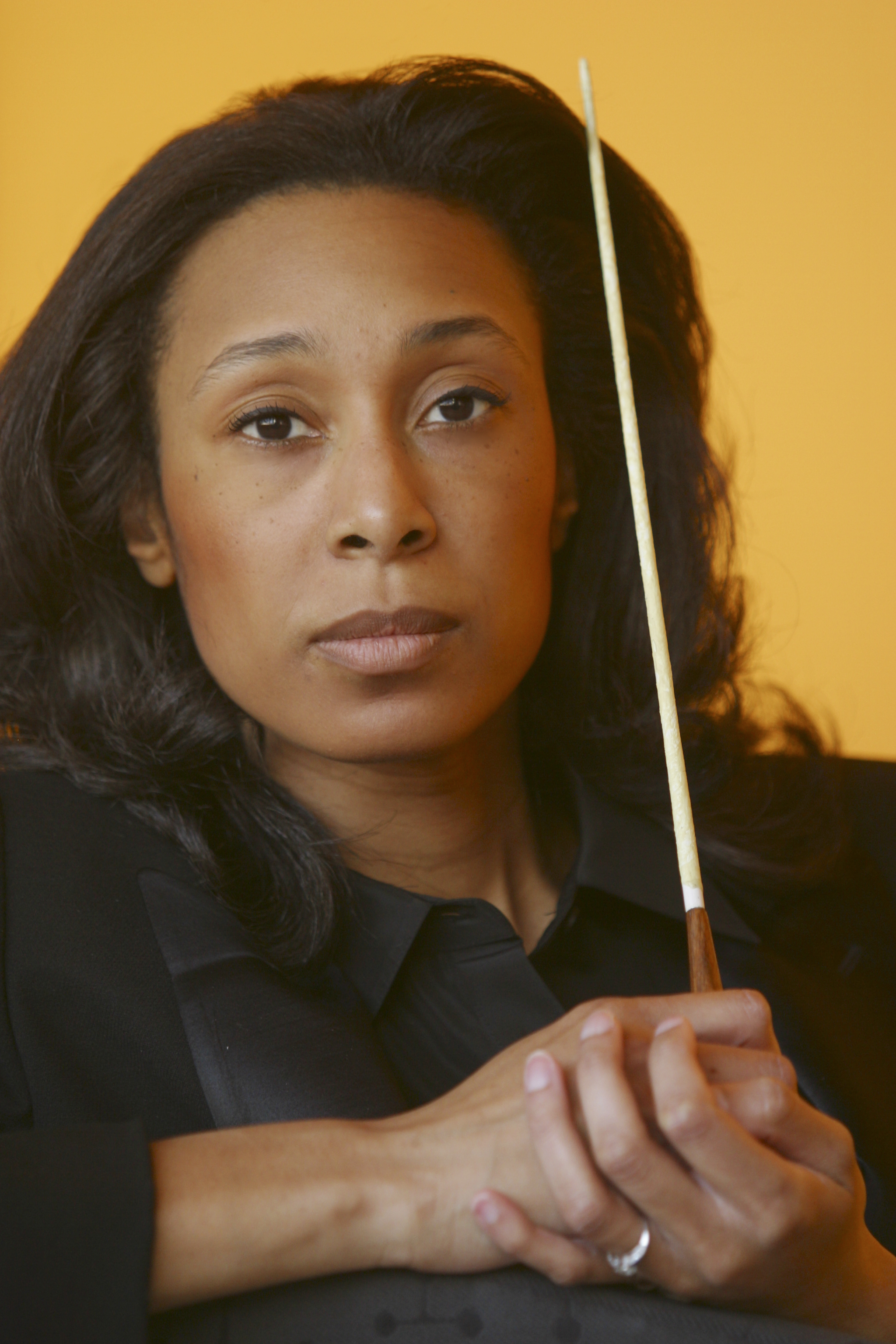

Background information
- Born: 1972 (age 53–54)
- Occupation: conductor
- Member of: Black Pearl Chamber Orchestra

Jeri Lynne Johnson (born 1972) is an African-American female conductor. She is the Founder and artistic director of the Black Pearl Chamber Orchestra, a professional ensemble in Philadelphia.

== Childhood and education ==
Johnson started piano lessons at the age of four. Her interest in orchestral literature and creating large-scale music beyond the piano developed after attending a performance of a Beethoven Symphony when she was seven years old.

She lived in several places during her youth, attended two high schools and graduated her senior year in Scottsdale, Arizona. Although Johnson did not have a formal music education in school, she had outside piano teachers. She then went on to study at Wellesley College in 1993 where she received a bachelor's degree in music and religion. At this all female school, she was inspired by women graduates such as Hillary Clinton and Madeleine Albright. She later received a master's degree in music history and music theory from the University of Chicago.

== Early accomplishments ==
Johnson attended the Aspen Music Festival in 1998 after winning the Jorge Mester Conducting Scholarship. She was the assistant conductor of the Chamber Orchestra of Philadelphia from 2000 to 2004. In 2005, she received the Taki Concordia Conducting Fellowship, making her the first African-American female to win an international award for conducting. Following these achievements, she had the opportunity to conduct orchestras from around the world, including the Philadelphia Orchestra, the Chamber Orchestra of Philadelphia, the Chicago Sinfonietta, the Colorado Symphony, the Bournemouth Symphony, and the Weimar Staatskapelle. She was heavily influenced by her mentors of Simon Rattle, Marin Alsop, and Daniel Barenboim.

== Career ==
Johnson is the Founder and artistic director of the Black Pearl Chamber Orchestra, established in 2008. Her orchestra received many grants from the National Endowment for the Arts and became the only organization in the United States to earn three grants from the Knight Foundation Arts Challenge. She is also the current cover conductor for the Delaware Symphony Orchestra.

=== Style ===
Johnson has conducted music from a wide range of genres. She has performed the works of many classical composers, such as winners of the MacArthur Fellowship. Johnson has also collaborated with many pop artists, including Jay Z, Alicia Keys and The Roots.

=== Composition ===
In addition to conducting, Johnson has composed many multimedia works. She had the opportunity to perform her own commissions for the See Hear! concert series at Kimmel Center and the computer visual music ensemble of Arts in Motion.

=== Recognition ===
Johnson has earned a 2009 Leeway Transformation Award, a 2010 Honoree in Arts and Culture for The Power Shift and a 2010 British American Project Fellow. She was named a 2010 Philly 360 Creative Ambassador by the Greater Philadelphia Tourism and Marketing Corporation, a 2010 British American Project Fellow and a 2011 Woman of Distinction by the Philadelphia Business Journal. Johnson has been recognized for her accomplishments on 20/20, The Tavis Smiley Show on NPR and on the NBC Today show alongside Marin Alsop and Joann Falletta.
