= Juan Gallastegui =

Spanish and American musician (born 1979)

- Born: Juan Antonio Gallastegui Roca; November 1979 (age 46); Castro Urdiales, Spain
- Citizenship: Spain; United States
- Education: Navarra Higher Music Conservatory (BA); University of La Rioja (BA, PhD); Bard College (MM); University of Cantabria (MEd)
- Occupations: Conductor; Musician; Composer
- Organizations: Bard College; League of American Orchestras
- Spouse: JoAnna Cochenet
- Father: Juan Antonio Gallastegui Ruiz
- Awards: Rafael del Pino Excellence Scholarship (2014)
- Scientific career
- Fields: Musicology
- Thesis: Fenomenología de la música de Sergiu Celibidache y su influencia en la dirección de orquesta en España (2017)
- Doctoral advisor: Thomas Ludwig Schmitt
- Other academic advisors: Harold Farberman (MA)
- Website: www.juangallastegui.com

Juan Antonio Gallastegui Roca (born November 1979) is a Spanish and American musician, composer, and conductor.

Born in Spain, he has been based in the United States since the early 2010s and since then, he has conducted several orchestras throughout the US, especially in Washington, DC. He has served as conductor of the Loudoun Symphony Orchestra, chief conductor of the Accord Symphony Orchestra, and music director and chief conductor of the Rogue Valley Symphonic Band, among others.

He holds a PhD in musicology, obtained with a thesis on Romanian conductor Sergiu Celibidache. He also teaches music and conducting at various universities, including Southern Oregon University.

== Early life and education ==
Gallastegui was born in November 1979 in the port city of Castro Urdiales, Spain, where he began his music studies in 1989. He was a member of the Municipal Wind Orchestra of Castro Urdiales as principal euphonium player between 1990 and 2012, a band which also included his father and uncle. In 2003 he was co-founder of the Castro Urdiales Municipal Wind Orchestra Association.

He earned his bachelor's degrees in tuba performance and pedagogy from the Navarra Higher Music Conservatory (CSMN) of Navarre in 2010, as well as in history and music sciences from the University of La Rioja in 2011. He subsequently completed a course in conducting aesthetics at the Transilvania University of Brașov in 2013.

In 2014 he was awarded the Rafael del Pino Excellence Scholarship for postgraduate studies abroad. He completed a master's degree in orchestral conducting at Bard College Conservatory of Music in 2015.

During his training at Bard College, he served as assistant conductor of the Bard College Conductors Institute Summer Orchestra and the Conservatory Orchestra, where he was mentored by Harold Farberman. In March 2015, Gallastegui conducted the revival of Farberman's opera Medea, the first performance of the work since its premiere in 1963.

Gallastegui also studied with Enrique García Asensio, Jorma Panula, Apo Hsu, Lawrence Golan, Mark Gibson, and Leon Botstein.

In 2017 he received his doctorate in musicology from the University of La Rioja with a thesis about Sergiu Celibidache.

In addition, Gallastegui also completed a course in orchestra management at the Juilliard School.

== Career ==
In 2016, Gallastegui joined the New York Wind Symphony Orchestra in New York City as the orchestra's principal euphonium, invited by Dutch conductor Johan de Meij. From 2016 to 2017, he was conductor of Loudoun Symphony Orchestra, a community orchestra in Ashburn, Virginia.

In September 2019, Gallastegui guest conducted the first concert of the season of the Accord Symphony Orchestra in Washington, D.C. The concert led to his appointment as the orchestra's chief conductor in October 2020.

In 2022, Gallastegui was invited to conduct the symphonic wind ensemble of the Musikene in San Sebastián, Spain, where he had previously played.

In January 2019 Gallastegui became associate music director of the Rockville Concert Band of Rockville, Maryland, after being chosen by the band members and after a successful first concert as a guest conductor, and in September 2020 he was officially appointed Music Director, becoming the 6th Music Director of the Rockville Concert Band. As musical director, he directed and conducted various musical productions, including the premiere of "The Year 2020" in 2022, a piece by de Meij that commemorated the COVID-19 pandemic.

In 2023, he was appointed music director of the Rogue Valley Symphonic Band (RVSB) in Ashland, Oregon. Since 2024, he has served as executive director of the Bremerton WestSound Symphony Orchestra in Bremerton, Washington.

Between 2022 and 2023, Gallastegui volunteered with the Maryland Defense Force Band as a military band musician. Within the band, he was a member of the Maryland Army National Guard's band.

In addition to orchestra conducting, Gallastegui has served as adjunct instructor at Southern Oregon University, where he led advanced instruction in conducting, score study, and technique.

Gallastegui is a member of the Conductors Guild, the League of American Orchestras, and the Association of Concert Bands.

== Personal life ==
Gallastegui lives in the United States. He is married to American conductor JoAnna Cochenet. They met while both studying at Bard College and married in 2015. In April 2021 he became a naturalized American citizen.

Gallastegui is an enthusiast of the US Space Program.

== Orchestrations ==
For orchestra:

- 2012, "Die Lotosblume" (string orchestra) and "Aus dem Schenkenbuch im Divan" (symphony orchestra) by Robert Schumann.
- 2011, "Liebst du um Schönheit" (string quartet) and "Nicht wiedersehen!" (symphony orchestra) by Gustav Mahler.

Published by the University of Navarra and performed by the Navarra Symphony Orchestra.

For wind orchestra:

- 2003, Mozart’s Requiem by Wolfgang Amadeus Mozart.

== Publications ==
- 2023, Maximizing Conducting Technique with Embodied Music Cognition Theory: A Comprehensive Guide.
- 2023, Unpacking the Link Between Embodied Music Cognition and Sergiu Celidache's Phenomenology of Music.

== Awards and honors ==
- 2014, Rafael del Pino Excellence Scholarship
- 2013-2014, Bard College Conducting Fellowship

== See also ==
- Harold Farberman
- Enrique García Asensio
- Johan de Meij
- Scott Yoo
