= Brigitte Peucker =

Academic

Brigitte Peucker (born 13 April 1948, in Berlin, Germany) is the Elias Leavenworth Professor of German Languages and Literatures and Professor of Film Studies at Yale University. A disciple of Yale University's Geoffrey Hartman, she has written on and teaches in film studies, particularly German cinema, as well as in German lyric poetry and literature. She is an expert on Alfred Hitchcock, horror film, and painting and cinema. She has been Chair of the Film Studies Program at Yale University 1986–2000, and of the German Department 1997–2002, 2003–4.

== Selected publications ==
- Arcadia to Elysium: preromantic modes in 18th century Germany (Studien zur Germanistik, Anglistik und Komparatistik, ISSN 0340-594X; 81), Bonn: Bouvier, 1980.
- Lyric Descent in the German Romantic Tradition, New Haven, C.T.: Yale University Press, cop. 1987.
- The Material Image: Art and the Real in Film, Stanford, C.A.: Stanford University Press, cop. 2007.
- Incorporating Images: Film and the Rival Arts, Princeton, N.J.: Princeton University Press, cop. 1995
- "Female body, textual body: Nature, art, and property in Voss's 'Luise'", Studies in German and Scandinavian Literature after 1500: A Festschrift for George C. Schoolfield, ed. by James A. Parente, Jr. and Richard Erich Schade. Columbia, S.C.: Camden House, cop. 1993, p. 94-100.
- "Looking and touching: Spectacle and collection in Sontag's 'Volcano lover'", The Yale Journal of Criticism, ISSN 0893-5378; 11(1998):1, p. 159–165
