= Gustav Meier =

Swiss conductor

- Born: 13 August 1929; Wettingen, Switzerland
- Died: 26 May 2016 (aged 86) Ann Arbor, Michigan
- Genres: Orchestral, operatic
- Occupation: Conductor

Gustav Meier (13 August 1929 – 26 May 2016) was a Swiss-born conductor and director of the Orchestra Conducting Program at the Peabody Institute of the Johns Hopkins University. He was also Music Director of the Greater Bridgeport Symphony Orchestra in Connecticut, for more than 40 years (1972–2013).

== Biography ==
Gustav Meier earned international acclaim as both an exceptional conductor and a truly gifted teacher. After graduating from the Zurich Conservatory, Meier continued his studies at the Vienna Music Academy, later renamed as the University of Music and Performing Arts Vienna (Universität für Musik und darstellende Kunst Wien) where he studied with the legendary teacher, Hans Swarowsky. Swarowsky's other students included Claudio Abbado, Mariss Jansons, Zubin Mehta, Ádám Fischer, Iván Fischer, Jesús López-Cobos, and Giuseppe Sinopoli, among others. Meier undertook further studies at the Academia Chigiana Siena. He began his career at the Lucerne Opera, followed by several seasons at the Vienna Chamber Opera and the Zurich Opera. In the U.S. his opera talents were quickly recognized, as he was soon conducting at the New York, Santa Fe, Miami, Minnesota, San Francisco Operas and others.

He led orchestras around the globe including the Zurich Tonhalle, São Paulo, China National, Pittsburgh, Colorado and Alabama Symphony Orchestras; New York City, Santa Fe, Miami, San Francisco, Zurich, and Minnesota Opera Companies; and the Budapest and Vienna State Opera Orchestras. His innovative artistic direction earned Meier critical praises in this country and abroad. Productions which received nationwide coverage included Stravinsky's Rake's Progress in which he collaborated with the film director Robert Altman (M.A.S.H., Nashville, The Players), William Bolcom's Songs of Innocence and Experience, which he conducted in Ann Arbor (American premiere) and at Chicago's Grant Park, and André Previn's All Good Boys Deserve Favour, a play by Tom Stoppard set for actors and symphony orchestra.

Meier's regular conducting engagements included several that spanned decades. From 1978 to 2006, Gustav Meier was music director and conductor of the Greater Lansing Symphony Orchestra in Lansing, Michigan. Upon retiring from this position after 28 seasons, he was given the honor of music director emeritus. The 2012–2013 season, his 41st season as music director of the Greater Bridgeport Symphony in Bridgeport, Connecticut, was his last season there. He served as director of the Graduate Conducting Program at the Peabody Conservatory in Baltimore, Maryland.

As one of the world's leading conducting teachers, Gustav Meier served on the faculties of Yale University (1960–1973) where he became the youngest full-time professor in the school's history, the Eastman School of Music (1973–1976), and the University of Michigan at Ann Arbor (1976–1995). He has also served on the faculty of the Tanglewood Music Center from 1980 to 1996 where he spent the summers overseeing Tanglewood's prestigious Conducting Seminar. The program selected the "absolute cream" of international students according to André Previn, a frequent guest in Meier's classes, along with Leonard Bernstein. Meier's original connection with Tanglewood dates to 1957 and 1958 when he himself was chosen as a conducting fellow and won top prizes. He was a member of one of the most remarkable conducting classes in the Tanglewood Music Center's history, one that included Claudio Abbado, Zubin Mehta and David Zinman. He regularly taught conducting master classes across North America, Europe and Asia. Conducting workshops took him to all corners of the world, such as Vancouver, Canada, Cabrillo, California, New York City, Beijing, Prague, and Sofia, Bulgaria.

His students have appeared with every major orchestra and opera company in the United States and abroad, some currently serving as music directors of prestigious musical institutions. Among his students are the late Yakov Kreizberg (First Prize Stokowski Competition Winner, Music Director Orchestre Philharmonique de Monte-Carlo, Netherlands Philharmonic and Principal Conductor Bournemouth Symphony Orchestra); John Mauceri (Music Director American Symphony Orchestra, Washington Opera, Scottish Opera, Pittsburgh Opera, Teatro Regio di Torino and Hollywood Bowl Orchestra) Marin Alsop (Music Director Baltimore Symphony and Cabrillo Festival), the first woman to be named music director of a major U.S. orchestra; Michael Repper (Youngest American conductor to win the Grammy Award for Best Orchestral Performance); Alexander Frey (Music Director Rome Philharmonic Orchestra, Berliner Ensemble, Bohemia Symphony Orchestra, Stern Chamber Orchestra); Carl St. Clair (Music Director Komische Oper Berlin and Pacific Symphony Orchestra); Antonio Pappano (Music Director Royal Opera Covent Garden and Orchestra Nazionale di Santa Cecilia); Rico Saccani (First Prize Karajan Competition Winner and Music Director Budapest Philharmonic Orchestra); Jun Märkl (Music Director of the Mannheim National Theater and Lyon National Symphony Orchestra); Bundit Ungransee (Co-First Prize Winner Lorin Maazel Conducting competition and Principal Guest Conductor Seoul Philharmonic Orchestra); Mark Gibson (Orchestra and Opera Director of Cincinnati Conservatory); Benjamin Loeb (Director International Workshop and Festival); and Bobby McFerrin (various ensembles including the Vienna Philharmonic Orchestra). Other students have won first prizes in prestigious conducting competitions including the Karajan in Berlin, Stokowski and Lorin Maazel competitions in New York City, the First International Eduardo Mata Conducting Competition in Mexico City, the Mario Gusella International Competition in Pecara, Italy, and the Sergei Prokofiev Conducting Competition in Saint Petersburg, Russia.

== Personal life ==
Gustav Meier was born in Wettingen, Switzerland, a small town on the Limmat River eight miles from German Border. Growing up in neutral Switzerland during Hitler’s ascendancy and WWII had a profound influence on him as he, his family and many Swiss had a perpetual sense that a German invasion was imminent.

At the age of five, his mother gave him a trumpet and taught him to play “Silent Night” as a Christmas gift to his father, August Meier, a factory foreman who was home for the holidays after working as he often did in neighboring countries for Brown Boveri. His father played the cornet in the Swiss cavalry as well as the local band and was thrilled to have his son show musical talent and signed him up for lessons with his childhood band instructor. At the age of six, August found an old piano for his wife Margarit on which Gustav and his mother took piano lessons together.

By age 15, Gustav entered the Conservatory as a piano and trumpet major and two years later in 1947, Gustav became the accompanist for a famous Swiss jazz and yodeling vocal trio touring Europe for a year.

After respiratory illness put an end to his trumpet playing, he played in a 13-piece pit orchestra for a small opera house and found his love of conducting prompting him to reenter Zurich Conservatory of Music for two years of conducting training.

While there, Gustav met American mezzo-soprano Shirley Sudock with whom he had his first serious relationship. They went on to perform around Europe—Zurich, Paris, Vienna and beyond with Gustav either accompanying Shirley on piano or conducting orchestras where she was the vocal soloist. At the age of 25, he had his first full-time conducting job as the court Conductor for Emperor Haile Selassie in Addis-Ababa, Ethiopia where he arranged popular music that Selassie liked to fit into the unusual instrumentation of the ensemble.

He returned to Europe in 1955 to study conducting in Vienna. During their time in Vienna, Gustav and Shirley were married in a small secular ceremony.

Gustav went on to the Tanglewood Conductors workshop in 1957 (where two of his classmates were Zubin Mehta and Claudio Abbado), and after a stint as Assistant Conductor to the Zurich Opera and freelancing in New York City, in 1960 he took a faculty position in charge of orchestra, taught orchestration and conducting at Yale University.

Gustav and Shirley had two children, a son Dani in 1961 and a daughter Eva in 1963. Shirley pursued her singing career and eventually started teaching voice at Connecticut College. Gustav stayed at Yale for more than a dozen years and the family spent summers at Yale’s summer music program in Norfolk, CT.

Gustav and Shirley separated in 1973 and subsequently divorced. Gustav left Yale to go to Eastman School of Music in Rochester New York. While in Rochester, Gustav married Emy Greer who’d been a doctoral student in piano at Yale establishing a blended family that included Dani and Eva (who still lived in Connecticut) and Emy’s daughters from a previous marriage, Angela and Pam Landon.

In 1976, Gustav left Eastman to be Professor of Conducting at University of Michigan and moved to Ann Arbor where they remained until Gustav’s death in 2016. His son Dani's remembrance is here.

Upon his death, Gustav was survived by his wife Emy Meier, his son Dani (Dawn), daughters Eva, Angy and Pam (Gary), and grandchildren Alicia Landon, Nora Andermeier (Arthur), Sean Atamian, Annarose Atamian, Ezra Andermeier, Nika Field and Dain Field. [Personal history added by son, Dani Meier]

== Awards and honors ==
- 1982: Distinguished Faculty Achievement Award, University of Michigan at Ann Arbor
- 1988: Luise Vosgerchian Teaching Award, Harvard University
- 1995: Ditson Conductor's Award from Columbia University
- 1999: Max Rudolf Award, Conductors Guild of America
- 1999: Doctor of Laws, Honorary Degree from Fairfield University
- 2003: Doctor of Music, Honorary Degree from Kalamazoo College
- 2005: Doctor of Fine Arts, Honorary Degree from Michigan State University

== Published works ==
- The Score, the Orchestra and the Conductor (Oxford University Press, 2009)
